= Hemsworth railway station =

Disused railway station in West Yorkshire, England

Hemsworth
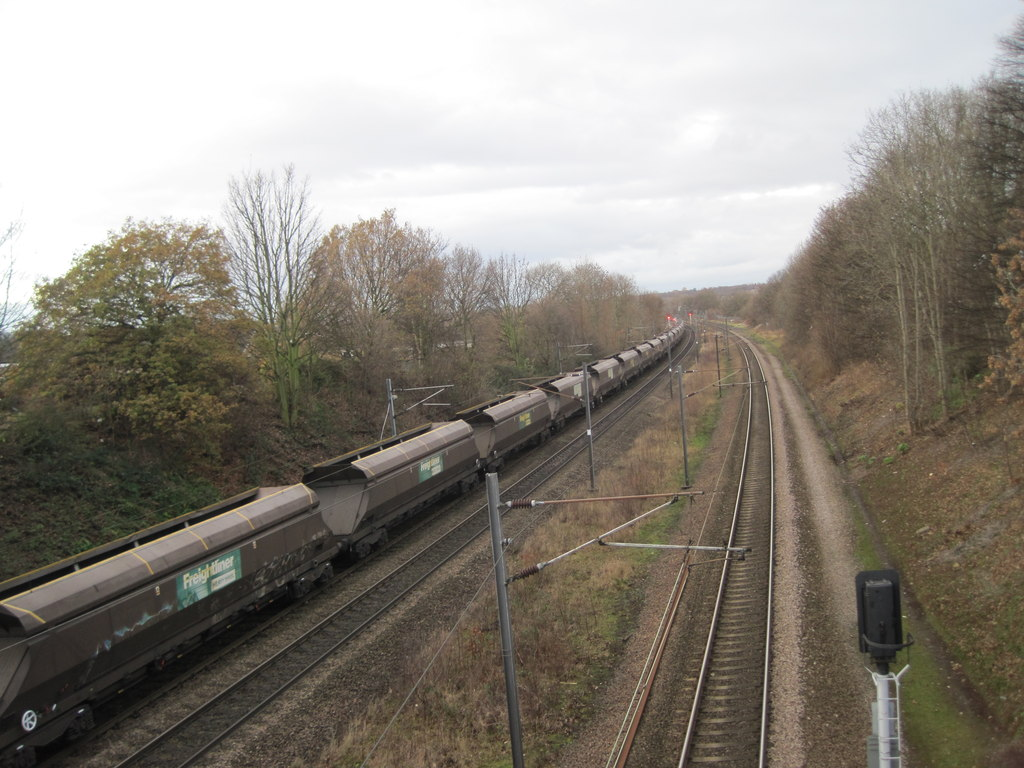
- Site of the former station (2012)

General information
- Location: Hemsworth, West Yorkshire; England
- Coordinates: 53.6193°N 1.3478°W
- Grid reference: SE432138
- Platforms: 2

Other information
- Status: Disused

History
- Original company: Great Northern Railway Manchester, Sheffield and Lincolnshire Railway
- Pre-grouping: Great Northern Railway Manchester, Sheffield and Lincolnshire Railway
- Post-grouping: LNER

Key dates
- 1 February 1866: Opened
- 6 November 1967: Closed
Location

Hemsworth railway station served the town of Hemsworth, West Yorkshire, England from 1866 to 1967 on the West Riding and Grimsby Railway.

== History ==
The station opened on 1 February 1866 by the Great Northern Railway. It closed to passengers and goods traffic on 6 November 1967.

Preceding station	Historical railways	Following station
South Elmsall	Great Northern Railway; West Riding and Grimsby Railway	Fitzwilliam
South Elmsall	Midland Railway; West Riding and Grimsby Railway	Fitzwilliam
