= Agbrigg =

Suburb of Wakefield, West Yorkshire, England

Coordinates: 53.66°N 01.48°W

- Agbrigg - shops on Doncaster Road

- Location within West Yorkshire
- OS grid reference: SE3419
  - London: 160 mi (260 km) SSE
- Metropolitan borough: City of Wakefield
- Metropolitan county: West Yorkshire
- Region: Yorkshire and the Humber
- Country: England
- Sovereign state: United Kingdom
- Post town: WAKEFIELD
- Postcode district: WF1
- Dialling code: 01924
- Police: West Yorkshire
- Fire: West Yorkshire
- Ambulance: Yorkshire

Agbrigg is a suburb of the city of Wakefield, West Yorkshire, England.

== History ==
The village of Agbrigg was historically within the parish of Sandal Magna and a large area of present-day Agbrigg was common land and can be seen on older maps as being referred to as 'Sandal Common'. The common was built upon by the 18th century and the area expanded predominately in the Victorian era to form the suburb seen today. The name 'Agbrigg' was afforded to the wapentake (a sub-division of a Riding - the term becoming obsolete from around 1900) which had upper and lower divisions; the latter spanning parishes of Batley, Crofton, Dewsbury, Ardsley (East and West), Featherstone, Methley, Mirfield, Newland, Normanton, Rothwell, Sandal, Thornhill, Wakefield and Warmfield. Once the wapentake disappeared, the name was used for a registration district (Lower Agbrigg registration district) from 1 January 1939 to 1 April 1974 when this registration district became part of the Wakefield registration district. At the start of the 20th century the village Agbrigg was absorbed into the city and became one of the city's southern suburbs.

== Location ==
The suburb is centred on Agbrigg Road (B6389), which links Barnsley Road (A61) with Doncaster Road (A638) and is situated between Sandal to the south west, Belle Vue to the north east, the Portobello Estate to the west, Walton to the south and Heath to the east. A now-disused section of the Barnsley Canal is located in the south west of the suburb, which was opened in 1799, and the Oakenshaw Beck runs parallel with the eastern end of Agbrigg Road before curving towards the south east and then runs parallel with Montague Street and Briary Close. After flooding hit the area in 2007, the Environment Agency and Wakefield Metropolitan District Council commenced flood defence work around Oakenshaw Beck and the land off Montague Street and Doncaster Road.

== Transport ==
Agbrigg is served by Sandal & Agbrigg station which is on the Wakefield Line and the station is between Wakefield Westgate and Fitzwilliam. This station was originally named Sandal and closed to passengers on 4 November 1957, but reopened by the West Yorkshire Metro on 30 November 1987 with its current name.

== Amenities ==
The majority of the suburb is made up of terraced houses however there are newer houses built on former fields and farmland. The Agbrigg and Belle Vue Community Centre can be found on Montague Street which was built upon former terrace housing and a library (called 'Sandal Library') is situated off Sparable Lane. There are a number of independent retailers within the area - many situated on Agbrigg Road. Agbrigg Park contains a small play area for children and football goalposts - there is a footpath which links Church View with the footpath from Montague Street.

== Education ==
The main primary school for the suburb is Sandal Magna Community Academy (formerly Sandal Magna Primary School) which is located on Belle Vue Road - the original Victorian buildings were demolished and a brand new school was built in 2010 and has won a number of awards for its architecture - including the RIBA Northern Networks Awards Sustainability Award in 2010 and RIBA Northern Networks Awards Building of the Year Award in 2011. There are other schools slightly outside of the Agbrigg area - these being closer to Sandal; such as St. Thomas à Beckett Secondary School and Sandal Castle Primary School both of which are on Barnsley Road. The latter is the newly amalgamated primary school from the former Castle Grove Infant School and Sandal Endowed Junior School and opened in September 2014.
