= Ossett and Denby Dale =

UK Parliament constituency (since 2024)

Coordinates: 53.61°N 1.61°W

- County constituency for the House of Commons
- Boundaries since 2024
- Boundary of Ossett and Denby Dale in Yorkshire and the Humber
- County: West Yorkshire
- Major settlements: Ossett, Denby Dale, Sandal Magna, Horbury, Skelmanthorpe

Current constituency
- Created: 2024
- Member of Parliament: Jade Botterill (Labour)
- Seats: One
- Created from: Wakefield; Dewsbury (part); Hemsworth (minor part)

Ossett and Denby Dale is a constituency of the House of Commons in the UK Parliament. Further to the completion of the 2023 review of Westminster constituencies, it was first contested at the 2024 general election. It is currently represented by Jade Botterill of the Labour Party.

== Constituency profile ==
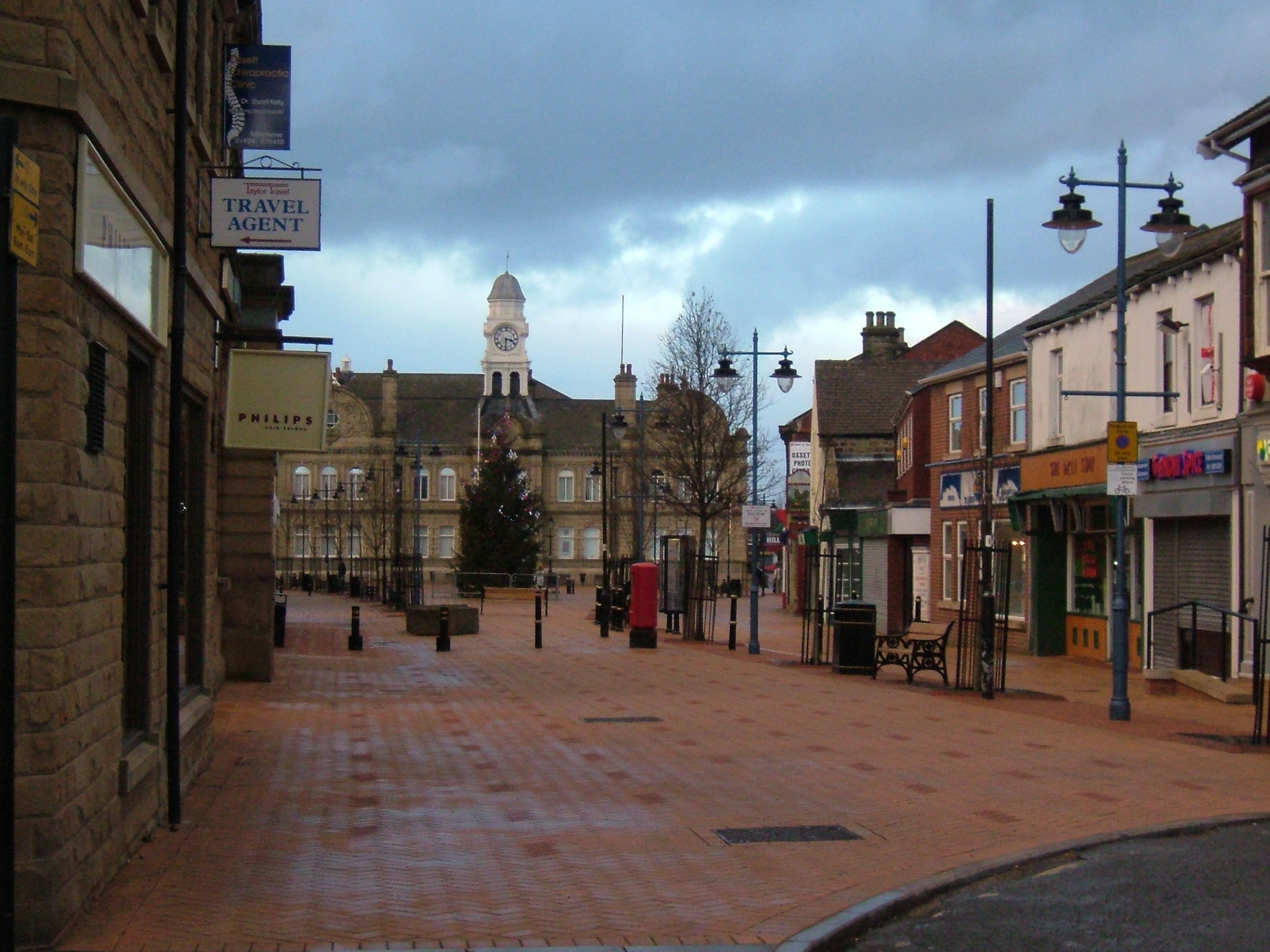
Ossett town centre

Ossett and Denby Dale is a constituency in West Yorkshire in England, covering parts of the City of Wakefield and Kirklees metropolitan boroughs. It is named after its largest town, Ossett, which has a population of around 22,000, and the rural civil parish of Denby Dale. Other settlements include the town of Horbury, the villages of Crigglestone, Clayton West, Skelmanthorpe and Kirkburton, and the Wakefield suburbs of Sandal Magna and Agbrigg.

This constituency covers towns and villages on the outskirts of Wakefield and the rural area to its south-west. It has an industrial heritage; Ossett and Horbury form part of the Heavy Woollen District, a region that was known for its textile production, especially recycled wool. The rural villages have a history of coal mining and the National Coal Mining Museum is located in the village of Overton. The constituency has overall above-average levels of wealth; Ossett, Horbury and Crigglestone have average rates of deprivation whilst the rural areas are mostly affluent. House prices are generally higher than the rest of Yorkshire but lower than the UK average.

Ossett and Denby Dale has a high proportion of older adults and retirees and a below-average proportion of young adults. Residents have above-average levels of income and homeownership and the child poverty rate is low. They have average levels of education and a high proportion work in the manufacturing and construction sectors. The percentage claiming unemployment benefits is low. White people made up 94% of the population at the 2021 census.

Most of the constituency is represented by Reform UK at the local council level with some Conservatives elected in the rural Denby Dale area. An estimated 59% of voters in the constituency supported leaving the European Union in the 2016 referendum, higher than the UK-wide rate of 52%.

== Boundaries ==
The constituency is composed of the following (as they existed on 1 December 2020):

- The Borough of Kirklees wards of: Denby Dale; Kirkburton (polling districts KB01, KB02, KB03A, KB03B, KB05, KB06, KB08 and KB09).
- The City of Wakefield wards of: Horbury and South Ossett; Ossett; Wakefield Rural; Wakefield South.

It covers the following areas:

In the City of Wakefield:

- Ossett, Horbury and rural areas to the south (Wakefield Rural ward) from Wakefield (abolished with remaining parts included in Wakefield and Rothwell)
- Sandal Magna and adjacent suburban areas to the south east of the city (Wakefield South ward) from Hemsworth (abolished and largely replaced by Normanton and Hemsworth)

In the Metropolitan Borough of Kirklees

- Denby Dale, Kirkburton and surrounding rural villages from Dewsbury (abolished and largely replaced by Dewsbury and Batley)

== Members of Parliament ==
Wakefield and Dewsbury prior to 2024

Election	Member	Party
2024	Jade Botterill	Labour

== Elections ==
=== Elections in the 2020s ===
General election 2024: Ossett and Denby Dale
Party	Candidate	Votes	%	±%
Labour	Jade Botterill	17,232	39.3	+8.1
Conservative	Mark Eastwood	12,690	28.9	−25.0
Reform	Sandra Senior	9,224	21.0	+15.9
Green	Neil Doig	2,132	4.9	+3.7
Liberal Democrats	James Wilkinson	1,785	4.1	−0.8
Yorkshire	David John Rowntree Herdson	810	1.8	−0.3
Majority		4,542	10.4	N/A
Turnout		43,873	60.7	−7.2
Registered electors		72,312		
Labour gain from Conservative		Swing	+16.6	

=== Elections in the 2010s ===
2019 notional result
Party	Vote	%
Conservative	26,177	53.9
Labour	15,150	31.2
Brexit Party	2,484	5.1
Liberal Democrats	2,400	4.9
Others	1,795	3.7
Green	602	1.2
Turnout	48,608	67.9
Electorate	71,595	

== See also ==
- Parliamentary constituencies in West Yorkshire
- List of parliamentary constituencies in the Yorkshire and the Humber (region)
