= Nostell railway station =

Disused railway station in West Yorkshire, England

Nostell
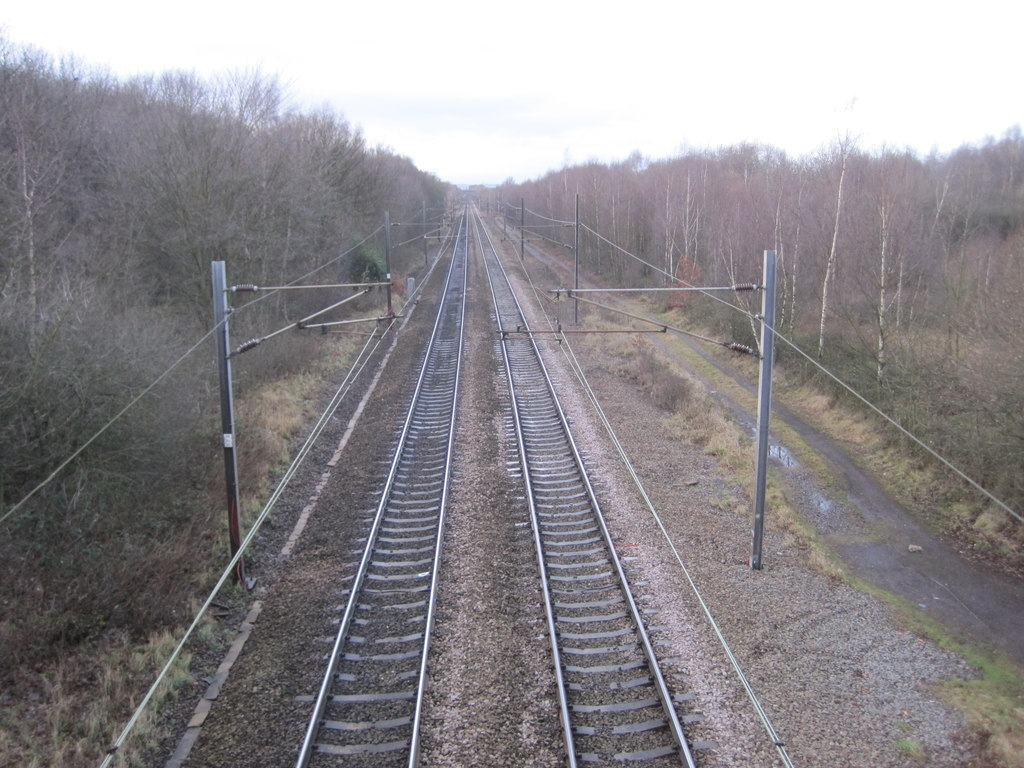
- Site of the former station in 2012

General information
- Location: Nostell, West Yorkshire; England
- Coordinates: 53.6428°N 1.3987°W
- Grid reference: SE398164
- Platforms: 2

Other information
- Status: Disused

History
- Original company: West Riding and Grimsby Railway
- Pre-grouping: West Riding and Grimsby Railway
- Post-grouping: LNER

Key dates
- 1 February 1866: Opened
- 29 October 1951: Closed
Location

Nostell railway station served the village of Nostell, West Yorkshire, England from 1866 to 1951 on the West Riding and Grimsby Railway.

== History ==
The station opened on 1 February 1866 by the Great Northern Railway. It station closed to both passengers and goods traffic on 29 October 1951.

Preceding station	Historical railways	Following station
Fitzwilliam	Great Northern Railway; West Riding and Grimsby Railway	Hare Park & Crofton
