= Hare Park & Crofton railway station =

Disused railway station in West Yorkshire, England

Hare Park & Crofton
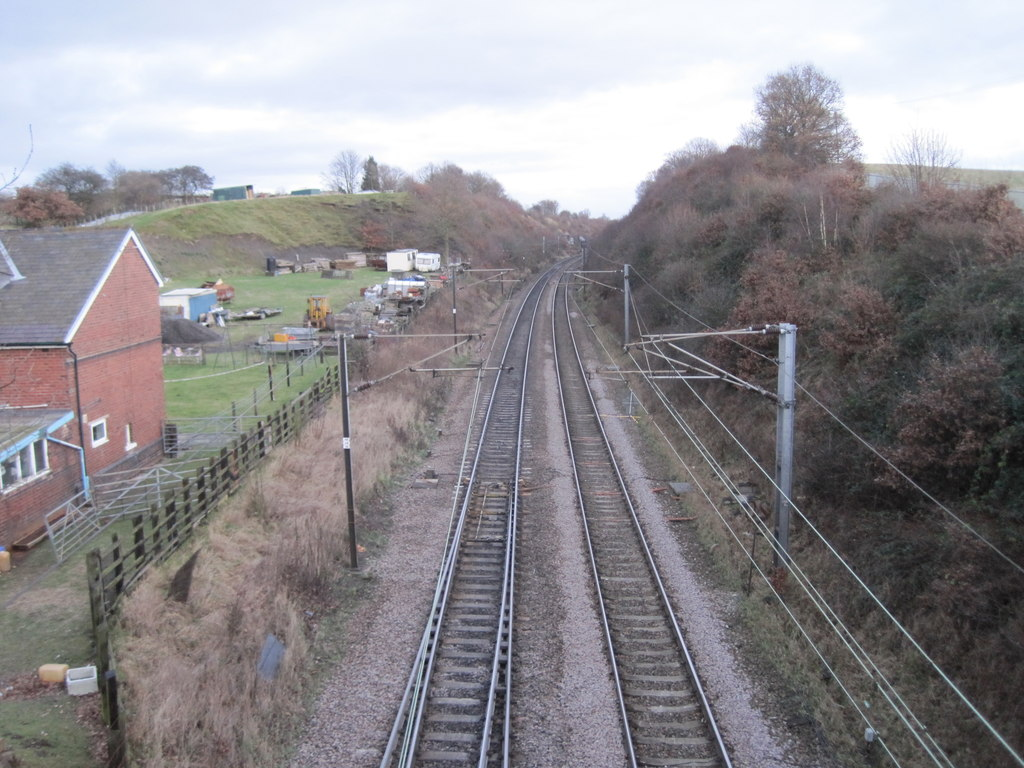
- The site of the station in 2012

General information
- Location: Crofton, City of Wakefield; England
- Coordinates: 53.651700°N 1.430220°W
- Grid reference: SE377173
- Platforms: 2

Other information
- Status: Disused

History
- Pre-grouping: West Riding and Grimsby Railway

Key dates
- 1885: opened
- 1952: closed
Location

Hare Park & Crofton railway station, sometimes just known as Crofton railway station, was a station located on the West Riding and Grimsby Railway, this section now known as the Wakefield Line. It served the village of Crofton in West Yorkshire, England and is located around 3 miles (4.8 km) to the south-east of Wakefield. The station was opened in November 1885 and closed on 4 February 1952.

This site, in the West Yorkshire transport plan, has been suggested for a new station with the village of Crofton now having a population of over 6,000 as well as this, the proposal of a new railway station further down the line closer to New Crofton is cited in the Crofton village plan, to hopefully remove congestion in the village, and cut down on carbon emissions.

Preceding station	Historical railways	Following station
Nostell	Great Northern Railway; West Riding and Grimsby Railway	Sandal & Agbrigg
