= Bramwith railway station (West Riding and Grimsby Railway) =

Disused railway station in South Yorkshire, England

Bramwith (WR&G)
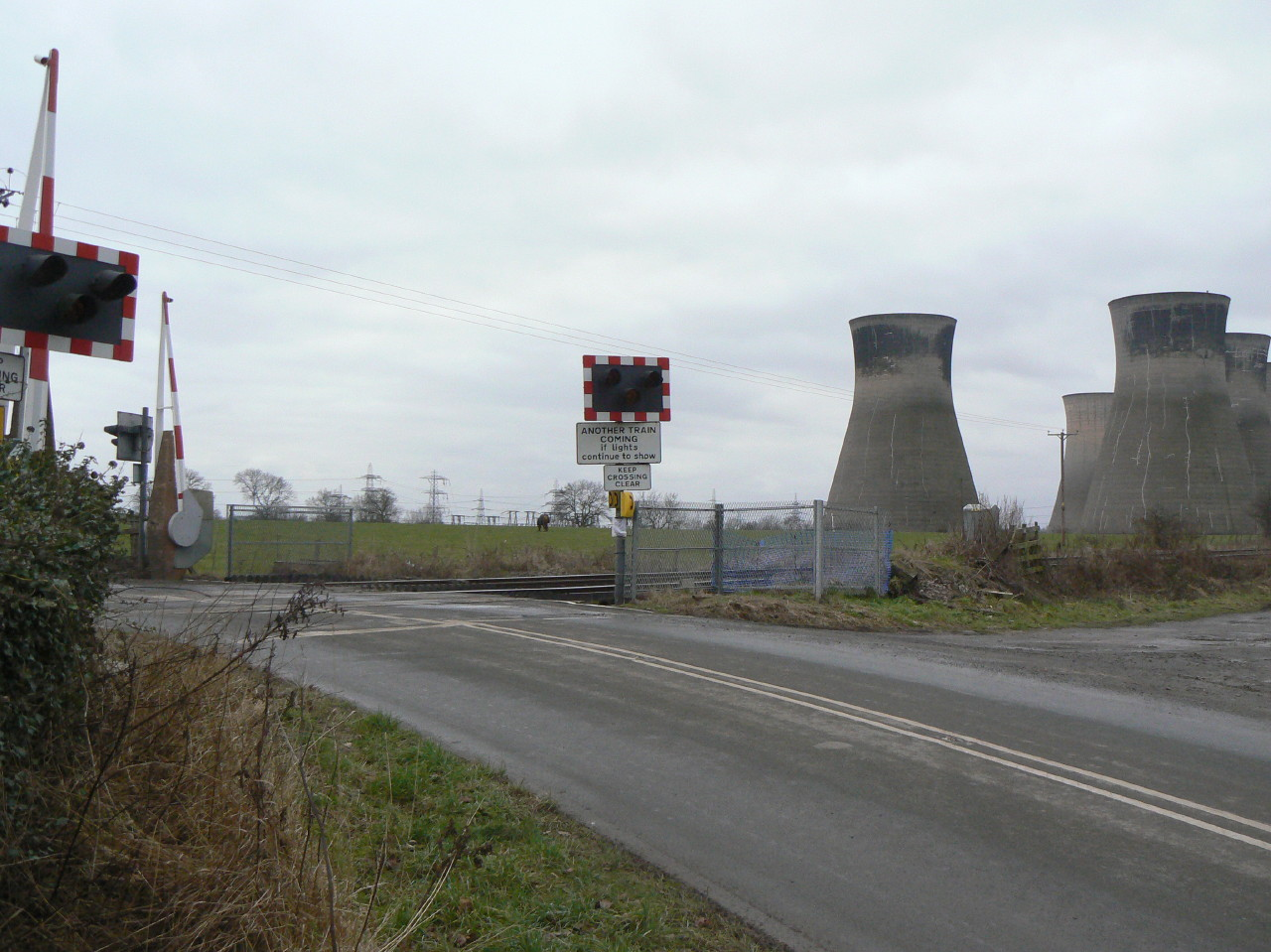
- Level crossing at the former station

General information
- Location: Barnby Dun, Doncaster; England
- Coordinates: 53.58350°N 1.07594°W
- Grid reference: SE619083

Other information
- Status: Disused

History
- Original company: West Riding and Grimsby Railway
- Pre-grouping: West Riding and Grimsby Railway
- Post-grouping: London and North Eastern Railway
Location

Bramwith (WR&G) railway station, which was named Barnby Dun on opening, believed to be 1872, due to its close proximity to the village of that name, took the name Bramwith, (from February 1882), from the village of Kirk Bramwith, near Doncaster, South Yorkshire, England although it was over two miles away. This was possibly to avoid confusion with the station rebuilt on the Manchester, Sheffield and Lincolnshire Railway's straightened line between Doncaster and Thorne. The station was also closer to the village of Thorpe-in-Balne, to the north, than Kirk Bramwith. It was located at the level crossing near the junction of North Field Lane with Bramwith Lane, east of the River Don Navigation.

The station was built by the West Riding and Grimsby Railway but this line (and so the station) never had a regular local passenger service. It was used by excursion passenger trains travelling between the West Riding Woollen District towns and Cleethorpes from opening until the early years of the 20th century, after which it continued as a goods station, traffic being mostly agricultural in nature. The station closed around 1933, but the line is still in use.
