= Joby Shaw =

GB international rugby league footballer

Personal information
- Full name: Stephen John Shaw
- Born: c. 1934 Crofton, Wakefield, England
- Died: 31 July 2010 (aged 76) Wakefield, England

Playing information
- Position: Hooker
Club
Years	Team	Pld	T	G	FG	P
1950–59	Wakefield Trinity	194	35
1959–65	Halifax	167
1966–??	Hull KR	11	0	0	0	0
	Total	372	35	0	0	0
Representative
Years	Team	Pld	T	G	FG	P
1958–63	Yorkshire	6	0	0	0	0
1960–62	Great Britain	5	1	0	0	3

Stephen John Shaw (c. 1934 – 31 July 2010), also known by the nickname of "Joby", was an English World Cup winning professional rugby league footballer who played in the 1950s and 1960s. He played at representative level for Great Britain and Yorkshire, and at club level for Wakefield Trinity and Halifax, as a hooker.

== Background ==
Joby Shaw was born in Crofton, West Riding of Yorkshire, England, and he died aged 76 in Wakefield, West Yorkshire, England.

== Playing career ==
=== Wakefield Trinity ===
Joby Shaw played hooker, and was sent off, in Wakefield Trinity’s 17–12 victory over Australia in the 1956–57 Kangaroo tour of Great Britain and France match at Belle Vue, Wakefield on Monday 10 December 1956.

Joby Shaw played hooker in Wakefield Trinity's 20–24 defeat by Leeds in the 1958–59 Yorkshire Cup Final during the 1958–59 season at Odsal Stadium, Bradford on Saturday 18 October 1958,

=== Halifax ===
Shaw was signed by Halifax in November 1958.

He played hooker in Halifax's 10–0 victory over Featherstone Rovers in the 1963–64 Yorkshire Cup Final during the 1963–64 season at Belle Vue, Wakefield on Saturday 2 November 1963.

=== Representative honours ===
Joby Shaw was selected for Yorkshire County XIII whilst at Wakefield Trinity during the 1958/59 season.

Joby Shaw won caps for Great Britain while at Halifax in the 1960 Rugby League World Cup against France, and Australia, in 1960 against France, in 1961 against France, and in 1962 against New Zealand.

Joby Shaw replaced Hull FC's Tommy Harris as hooker in Great Britain's 1960 Rugby League World Cup winning team for the final two matches against France and Australia.
