= Listed buildings in Crofton, West Yorkshire =

Crofton is a civil parish in the metropolitan borough of the City of Wakefield, West Yorkshire, England. The parish contains ten listed buildings that are recorded in the National Heritage List for England. Of these, one is listed at Grade II*, the middle of the three grades, and the others are at Grade II, the lowest grade. The parish contains the village of Crofton and the surrounding countryside. The listed buildings include a church and structures in the churchyard, including a mausoleum, houses and cottages, a public house, a farmhouse and farm buildings, and a set of stocks.

== Key ==
Grade	Criteria
II*	Particularly important buildings of more than special interest
II	Buildings of national importance and special interest

== Buildings ==
Name and location	Photograph	Date	Notes	Grade
All Saints Church; 53.65831°N 1.42971°W		c. 1300	The tower is the oldest part of the church, with most of the rest dating from about 1430. It was restored in 1873–75, and is in Perpendicular style. The church is built in stone, and has a cruciform plan, consisting of a nave, a south porch, north and south transepts, a chancel, and a tower at the crossing. The tower has a clock face on the south side, and an embattled parapet with corner pinnacles. Along the sides of the church is a moulded parapet, and at the tops of the buttresses are gargoyles.	II*
Grave slab and sarcophagus 53.65825°N 1.42991°W		Medieval (possible)	The sarcophagus and grave slab are in the churchyard of All Saints Church; the sarcophagus is the older, with the grave slab dating from about 1743. The sarcophagus is cut from a single piece of stone, tapering to the foot, broadening at the shoulders, and narrowing to the head, with an inner recess for the head. The grave slab is carved with an inscription and winged heads.	II
51–59 High Street; 53.65577°N 1.42771°W	—	Late 17th century	A row of five cottages, originating with a timber framed house that was later encased in stone, and cottages added in the 18th century. The roofs are in stone slate and pantiles, with coped gables and kneelers. There are two storeys, and a single-storey rear outshut. The original house has a doorway with tie-stone jambs and a segmental-arched lintels.	II
Bedford Farmhouse; 53.65372°N 1.42522°W	—	1677	The house is in stone, with quoins, a hood mould over the ground floor openings, and a stone slate roof with coped gables. There are two storeys, two bays, and a rear outshut. The doorway at the left end has composite jambs, and an ogee lintel carved with two shields, one with the date, and the other with a coat of arms. To the right is an inserted doorway with monolithic jambs.	II
Former Lord of the Manor public house 53.65283°N 1.42156°W		c. 1700	A house, later a public house, the rear wing was added in the 19th century. The main part is in sandstone, the upper floor of the rear wing is in brick, and the roof is in stone slate. There are two storeys, three bays, and a rear wing. The inserted doorway has a chamfered surround, tie-stone jambs, and a re-used initialled and dated lintel. In the flanking bays are mullioned windows with some mullions removed, and the upper floor and rear wing contain sash windows.	II
Ivy house, cottage and outbuildings 53.66809°N 1.47027°W	—	Early 18th century	The house dates from about 1793, the cottage is earlier, and a mill and a blacksmith's workshop were added in the 19th century. The house and cottage are in stone with stone slate roofs. The house has two storeys and four bays, and contains casement windows, and the cottage has one storey, two bays, and a sliding sash window. The mill and workshop are in brick, the mill with a roof of stone slate and pantile ridge courses; it has three storeys and two bays, and contains a central loading bay. The workshop has a roof of pantiles and asbestos sheet, it contains sash windows, and inside is a forge.	II
Grave slab memorial 53.65825°N 1.43005°W	—	c. 1733	The grave slab is in the churchyard of All Saints Church, and is to the memory of Anne Ingham. It is in stone and has a top carved with an initial letter and winged heads in the spandrels.	II
Stocks; 53.65817°N 1.43010°W		1759	The stocks are near the entrance to the churchyard to All Saints Church. They consist of two monoliths with grooves for wooden keepers on a stone base, with four recesses for arms and legs.	II
Oakenshaw Grange; 53.66571°N 1.45630°W	—	Late 18th century	A house, at one time a hotel, it was extended to the rear in the 19th century. The main part of the house is in stone, with red-brown brick at the rear, and a hipped stone slate roof. There are three storeys, a symmetrical front of three bays with a pediment above the middle bay, and a rear wing with a two-storey lean-to. In the centre is an open porch with channelled quoin pilasters, a semicircular arch with imposts and a dropped keystone, and a triangular pediment, and the doorway has monolithic jambs. The windows on the front are sashes, and on the left return is a two-storey canted bay window.	II
Wilson Mausoleum; 53.65847°N 1.42908°W		1912	The mausoleum is in the churchyard of All Saints Church, it is in stone and has a rectangular plan. On each front are three open moulded round arches on Doric columns of polished granite. The east front is approached by three steps, and in the centre is a cartouche. Between the arches are ornate cast iron railings. On the top is a dome with four moulded stone ribs and roof panels of polished granite, and it is surmounted by an urn finial. Inside, there is a marble statue depicting a kneeling angel, and three marble tomb slabs.	II
