= Sandal and Agbrigg railway station =

Railway station in West Yorkshire, England

Sandal and Agbrigg
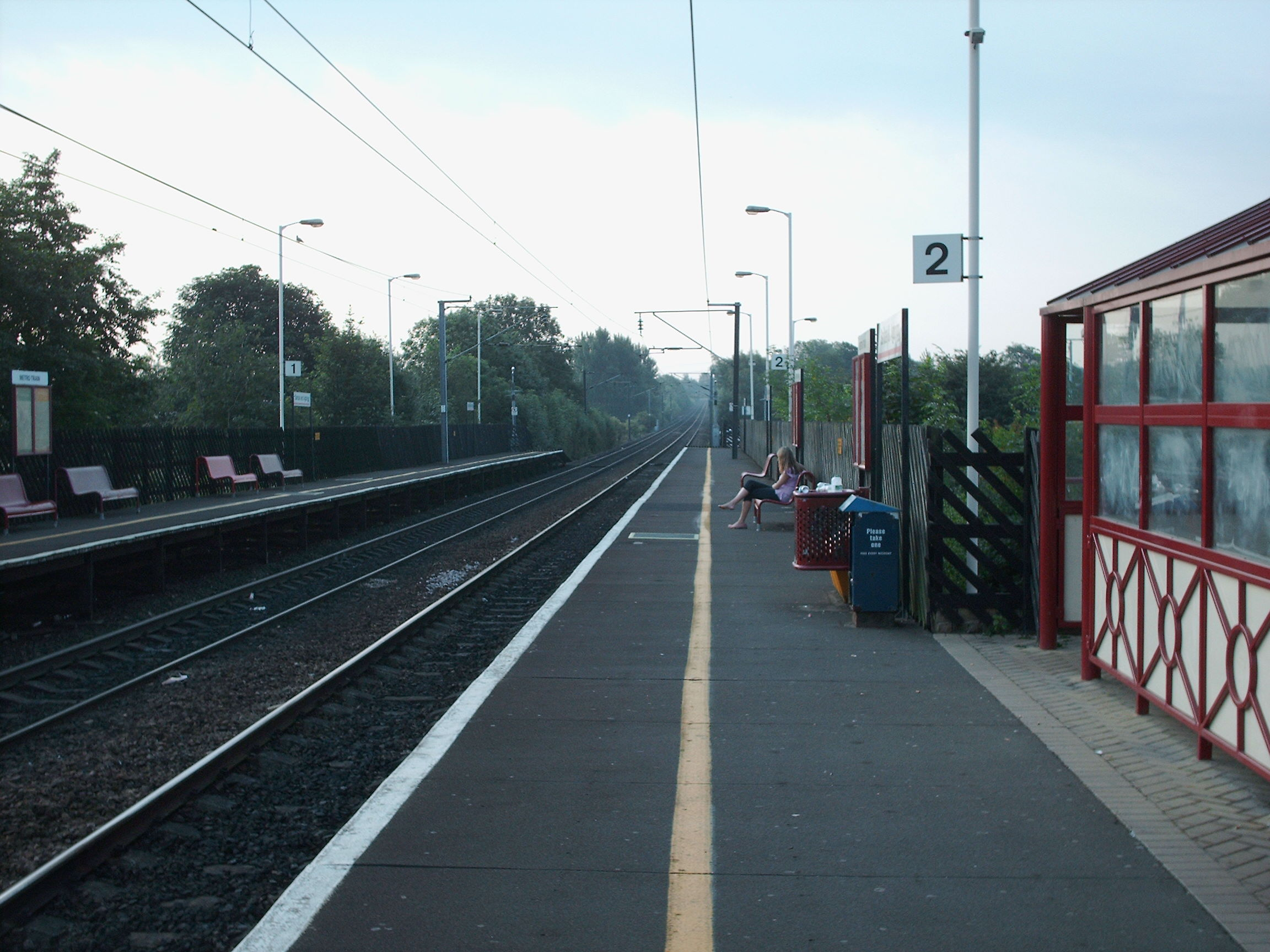
- View from Platform 2

General information
- Location: Agbrigg, City of Wakefield; England
- Coordinates: 53.663000°N 1.481000°W
- Grid reference: SE343186
- Transit authority: West Yorkshire (Metro)
- Platforms: 2

Other information
- Station code: SNA
- Fare zone: 3
- Classification: DfT category F1

History
- Original company: West Riding and Grimsby Joint Railway
- Pre-grouping: London and North Eastern Railway

Key dates
- February 1866: Original 'Sandal' station opened
- 4 November 1957: Closed to passengers
- 30 November 1987: Reopened as 'Sandal and Agbrigg'

Passengers
- 2020/21: ▼58,554
- 2021/22: ▲0.143 million
- 2022/23: ▲0.175 million
- 2023/24: ▲0.190 million
- 2024/25: ▲0.202 million
Location
Notes
- Passenger statistics from the Office of Rail and Road

Sandal and Agbrigg railway station serves the Wakefield suburbs of Sandal and Agbrigg in West Yorkshire, England. It lies on the Wakefield Line and is operated by Northern Trains.

== History ==
The station was opened in February 1866 as 'Sandal' and was on the West Riding and Grimsby Joint Railway which linked Wakefield with Doncaster. Approximately 1.3 miles south east of Sandal railway station in the village of Walton on the North Midland Railway line was another station called Sandal and Walton. Just south of the station there was a spur which linked the WR&GR line with the NMR line which crossed over Oakenshaw Lane. In 1923, the line became part of the London and North Eastern Railway before being absorbed into British Rail after nationalisation.

It was closed to passengers on 4 November 1957, but the route remained open.

The station was then reopened at the same site and renamed Sandal and Agbrigg on 30 November 1987 by the West Yorkshire Passenger Transport Executive, one of several closed stations in the West Yorkshire area which were reopened during the mid/late eighties and early nineties (other examples included Frizinghall, Outwood and Steeton and Silsden).

== Facilities ==
The station has two wooden platforms with waiting shelters and digital CIS displays. It is unstaffed but has a self-service ticket machine, customer help points and automated announcements provide train running information. Step-free access on both sides is via ramps.

== Services ==
On Mondays to Saturdays, services to Wakefield Westgate and Leeds northbound operate twice each hour, with an hourly service to each of Doncaster and Sheffield southbound.

On Sundays, there is a similar service frequency in operation (hourly to both Doncaster and Sheffield, two per hour to Wakefield and Leeds) but starting later in the day.

Preceding station	National Rail	Following station
Fitzwilliam	Northern Trains Wakefield Line	Wakefield Westgate
Historical railways
Hare Park & Crofton	Great Northern Railway West Riding and Grimsby Railway	Wakefield Westgate
