= Sandal Magna =

Suburb in Wakefield, West Yorkshire, England

Coordinates: 53°39′30″N 01°28′59″W

Sandal
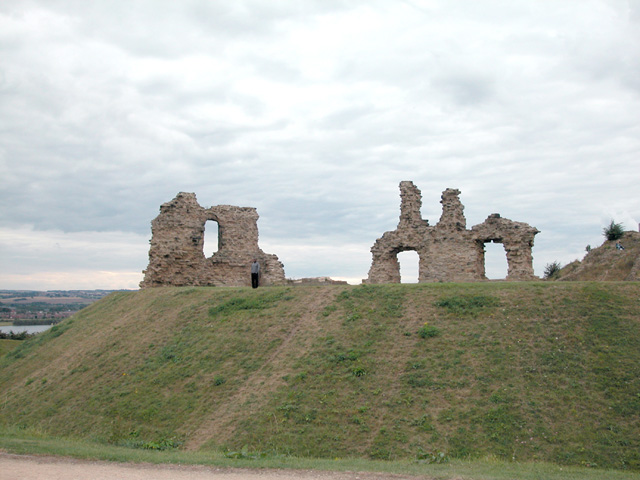
- Sandal Castle remains

- Location within West Yorkshire
- Population: 5,432
- OS grid reference: SE340180
- Metropolitan borough: City of Wakefield
- Metropolitan county: West Yorkshire
- Region: Yorkshire and the Humber
- Country: England
- Sovereign state: United Kingdom
- Post town: WAKEFIELD
- Postcode district: WF2
- Dialling code: 01924
- Police: West Yorkshire
- Fire: West Yorkshire
- Ambulance: Yorkshire
- UK Parliament: Ossett and Denby Dale

Sandal Magna or Sandal is a suburb of Wakefield, West Yorkshire, England with a population in 2001 of 5,432. An ancient settlement, it is the site of Sandal Castle and is mentioned in the Domesday Book. It is 2 miles (3 km) south from Wakefield, 8 miles (13 km) north of Barnsley. The Battle of Wakefield was fought here in the 15th century during the Wars of the Roses.

== History ==
=== Toponymy ===
The name Sandal derives from the Early Scandinavian sandr meaning sand or gravel and healh, a meadow.

=== Early history ===
In the Domesday Book of 1086 Sandal is recorded as a berewick (a village where barley was grown) in Wachefeld (Wakefield) where there was a church with a priest. The church was on the site of the present church of St Helen.

William de Warenne, 2nd Earl of Surrey (1081–1138) was granted the Sandal estates in 1107 and began the building of Sandal Castle which became the baronial seat of the lords of the manor of Wakefield.

During the Wars of the Roses, the Duke of York was killed on 30 December 1460 in the Battle of Wakefield fought between Sandal Castle and St Helen's Church.

There are records of mining for coal and quarrying for stone in the 14th century.

The highwayman John Nevison was arrested on 6 March 1684 at the Three Houses Inn and tried for the murder of Darcy Fletcher, a constable who had tried to arrest him near Howley Hall at Soothill in Batley.

== Geography ==
Sandal, situated on the south side of the River Calder on the road from Wakefield to Barnsley, covers 1,700 acres (688 ha). It is 2 miles (3 km) from Wakefield, 8 miles (13 km) from Barnsley, 9 mi (14 km) from Pontefract, 15 miles (24 km) from Leeds, 19 miles (31 km) from Bradford, 25 miles (40 km) from Sheffield, and 30 miles (48 km) from York. The main road through Sandal is the A61 Wakefield-to-Barnsley road.

Location grid

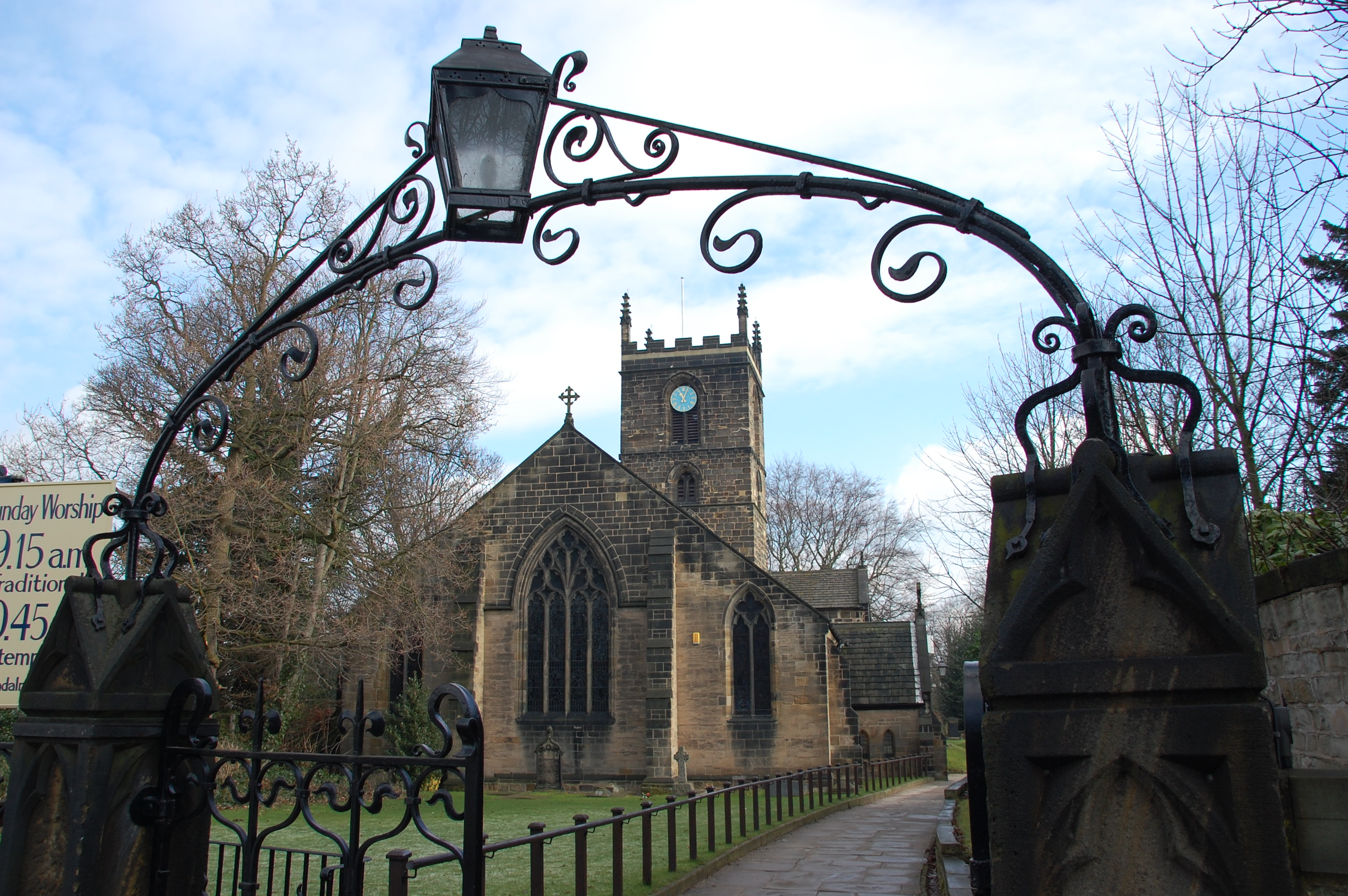
St Helen's Church

== Governance ==
Sandal was anciently a parish town in the Agbrigg Division of the wapentake of Agbrigg and Morley in the liberty of Wakefield, West Riding of Yorkshire. Following the Poor Law Amendment Act 1834, Sandal Magna became one of the 17 constituent parishes of the Wakefield Poor Law Union formed in 1837.

From 1894 to 1909 Sandal Magna was an urban district. The district contained the civil parish of Sandal Magna. In 1921 the parish had a population of 9280. On 1 April 1925 the parish was abolished and merged with Wakefield.

== Religion ==
Sandal Magna's church is dedicated to St. Helen, the mother of Constantine the Great. At the time of the Norman Conquest Sandal Church was a possession of the crown. The Saxon church was recorded as one of two churches in the Wakefield manor in the Domesday Book of 1086.

In about 1150 the first church was replaced by a second church in the shape of a Latin cross by Earl Warenne of Sandal Castle. It was enlarged in about 1180 and almost completely rebuilt in the first half of the 14th century. The church was altered and extended after 1505 and the present church extensively restored and enlarged in 1872.

== Transport ==
The Sandal and Agbrigg railway station on the Wakefield line (part of the West Yorkshire Metro) with services operated by Northern is at the north-east side of the neighbourhood and serves Sandal and the adjacent suburb of Agbrigg.

== Amenities ==
Largely a residential area, its amenities include a library, schools, the Anglican church of St Helen, a Methodist church and a supermarket.
