= Harry Roberts (footballer, born 1904) =

English footballer

Personal information
- Full name: Harry Roberts
- Date of birth: 27 June 1904
- Place of birth: Crofton, England
- Date of death: 18 May 1968 (aged 63)
- Place of death: Stonehouse, Plymouth, England
- Height: 5 ft 8 in (1.73 m)
- Position: Right back

Senior career*
Years	Team	Apps	(Gls)
–	Castleford Town		
1925–1930	Leeds United	84	(2)
1930–1937	Plymouth Argyle	248	(21)
1937–1939	Bristol Rovers	77	(0)
–	Frickley Colliery		
- * Club domestic league appearances and goals

Harry Roberts (27 June 1904 – 18 May 1968) was an English professional footballer who made 409 appearances in the Football League playing for Leeds United, Plymouth Argyle and Bristol Rovers. He played as a right back.

Roberts was born in Crofton, in what is now West Yorkshire. He played as an amateur for Castleford Town before joining Leeds United, for whom he made his debut in the Football League during the 1925–26 season. He made 84 League appearances for Leeds before moving on to Plymouth Argyle, where he was a regular first-team selection for seven seasons and played more than 250 games for the club in all competitions. He left for Bristol Rovers in 1937, and returned to Yorkshire in 1939 to play for Frickley Colliery. He died in 1968 in the Royal Naval Hospital, Stonehouse, aged 63.
