= Jade Botterill =

British politician (born 1990)

Jade Botterill MP
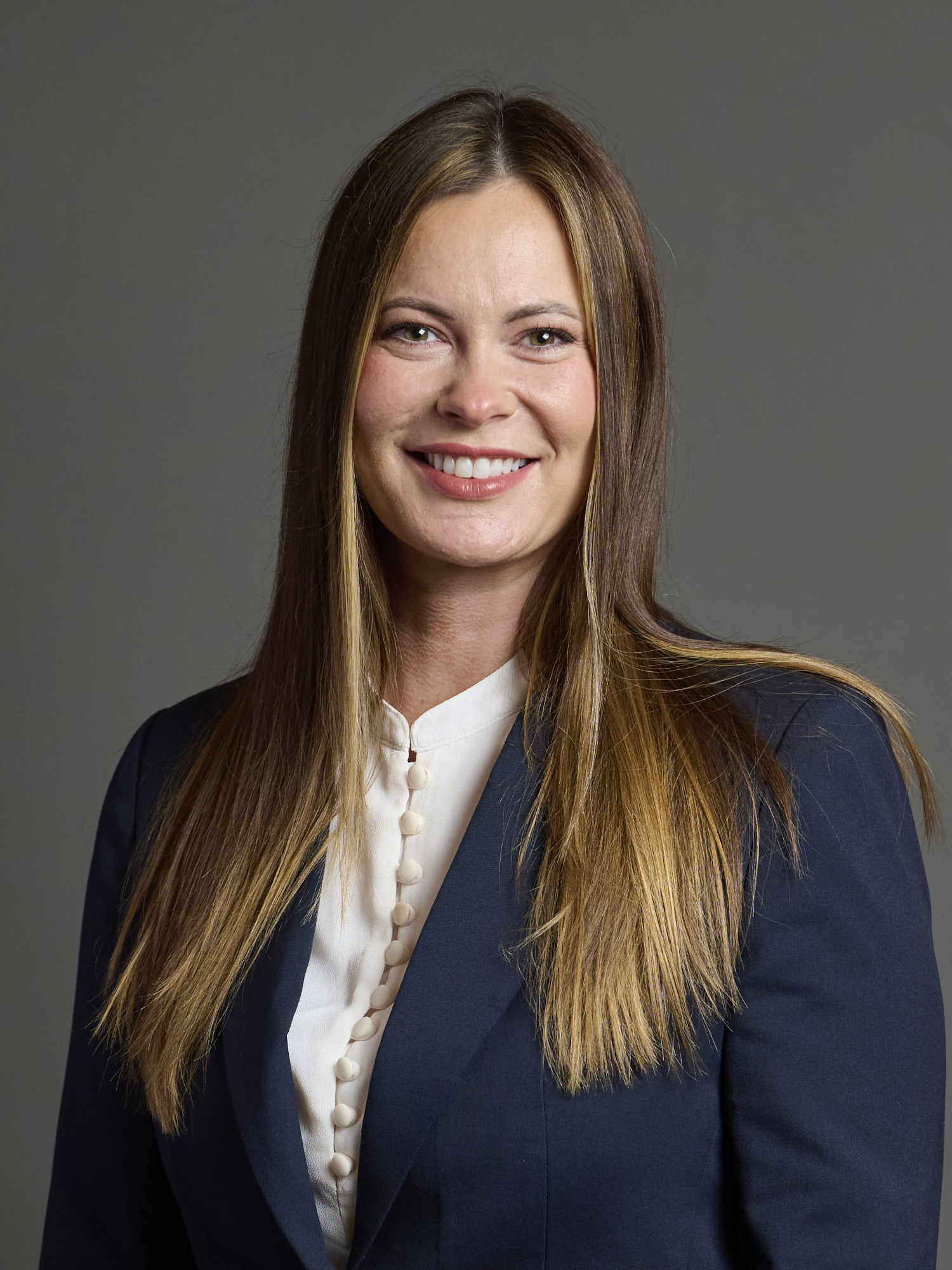
- Official portrait, 2024

Lord Commissioner of the Treasury
- Incumbent
- Assumed office 12 June 2026
- Prime Minister: Andy Burnham
- Preceded by: Stephen Morgan

Assistant Government Whip
- In office 7 September 2025 – 12 June 2026
- Prime Minister: Keir Starmer
- Succeeded by: Emma Foody

Member of Parliament for Ossett and Denby Dale
- Incumbent
- Assumed office 4 July 2024
- Preceded by: Constituency Established
- Majority: 4,542 (10.4%)

Personal details
- Born: Jade Alexandra Botterill; December 1990 (age 35)
- Party: Labour
- Website: jadebotterill.com

Jade Alexandra Botterill (born December 1990) is a British politician. A member of the Labour Party, she been the Member of Parliament for Ossett and Denby Dale since 2024. In 2026, she has served as a Lord Commissioner of the Treasury.

== Early life ==
Botterill was born in December 1990. She grew up in Wakefield, where her mother worked as a carer and her father as a prison officer. Between age 13 and 16, she worked at a River Island store. She also worked as the community development officer for local rugby team Wakefield Trinity where she campaigned to improve local children's health and wellbeing.

== Early career ==
From 2013 to 2019, Botterill worked as parliamentary assistant and head of office to Yvette Cooper, whom she met while campaigning to save a Best Start centre in Cooper's Normanton, Pontefract and Castleford constituency. She was an organizer for 38 Degrees. She was a corporate affairs adviser for Yorkshire Water. Shortly after announcing her parliamentary campaign, she was hired to Portland Communications.

== Parliamentary career ==
Botterill was selected as the Labour prospective parliamentary candidate for the Ossett and Denby Dale constituency in September 2023.

Shortly after her election, Botterill was appointed as the parliamentary private secretary to the Home Office. In her maiden speech, she said one of her focuses as a Member of Parliament would be campaigning for opportunities for young people in her constituency.

In the September 2025 cabinet reshuffle, Botterill was appointed to the ministerial position of assistant government whip.

Botterill has campaigned and voted for more regulation of the water industry. She supported the Online Safety Amendment (Social Media Minimum Age) Act 2024.

Parliament of the United Kingdom
New constituency	Member of Parliament for Ossett and Denby Dale; 2024–present	Incumbent
