= Lords Commissioners of the Treasury =

Political office in the United Kingdom

- Coat of Arms used by His Majesty’s Government.

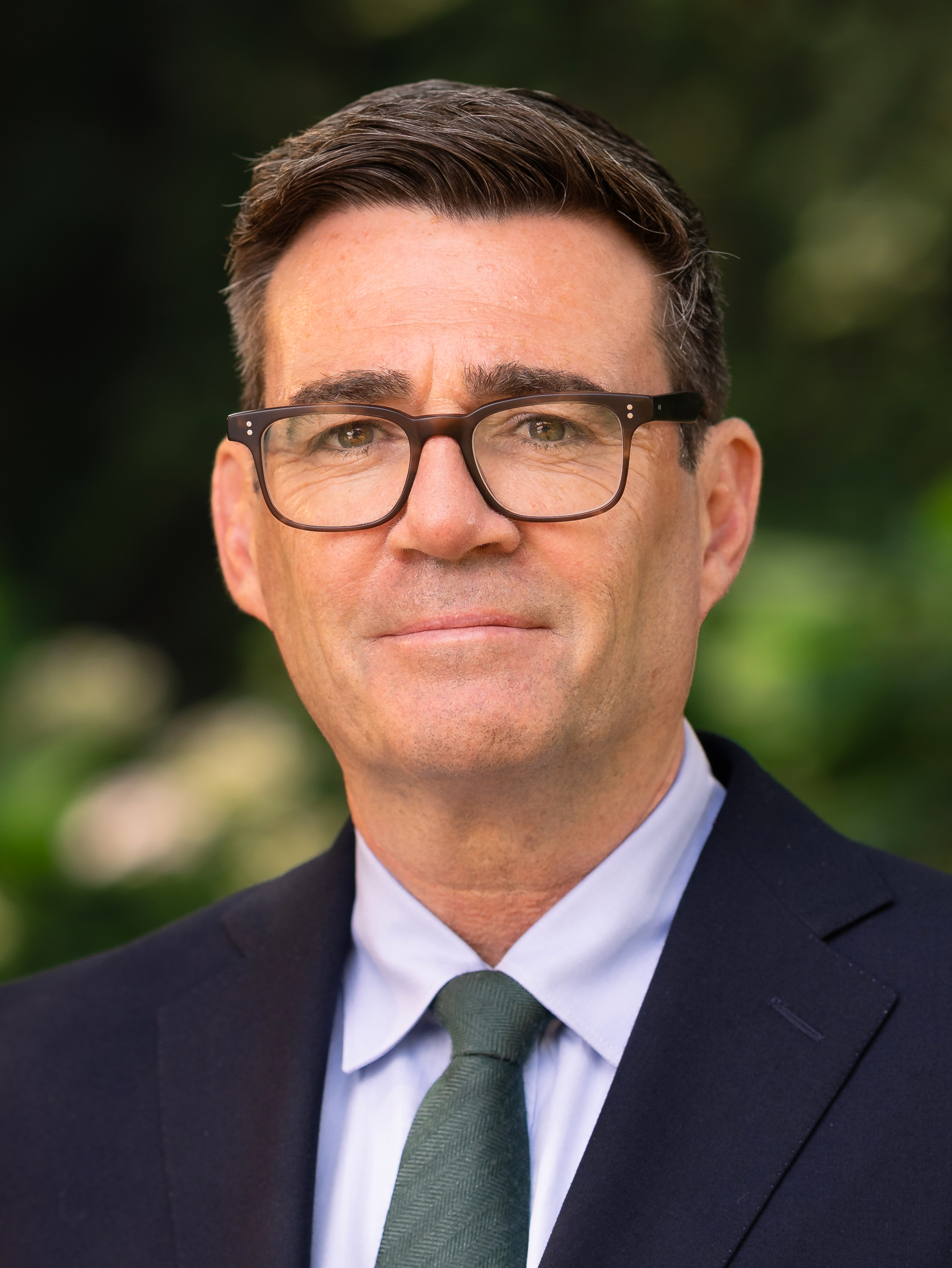
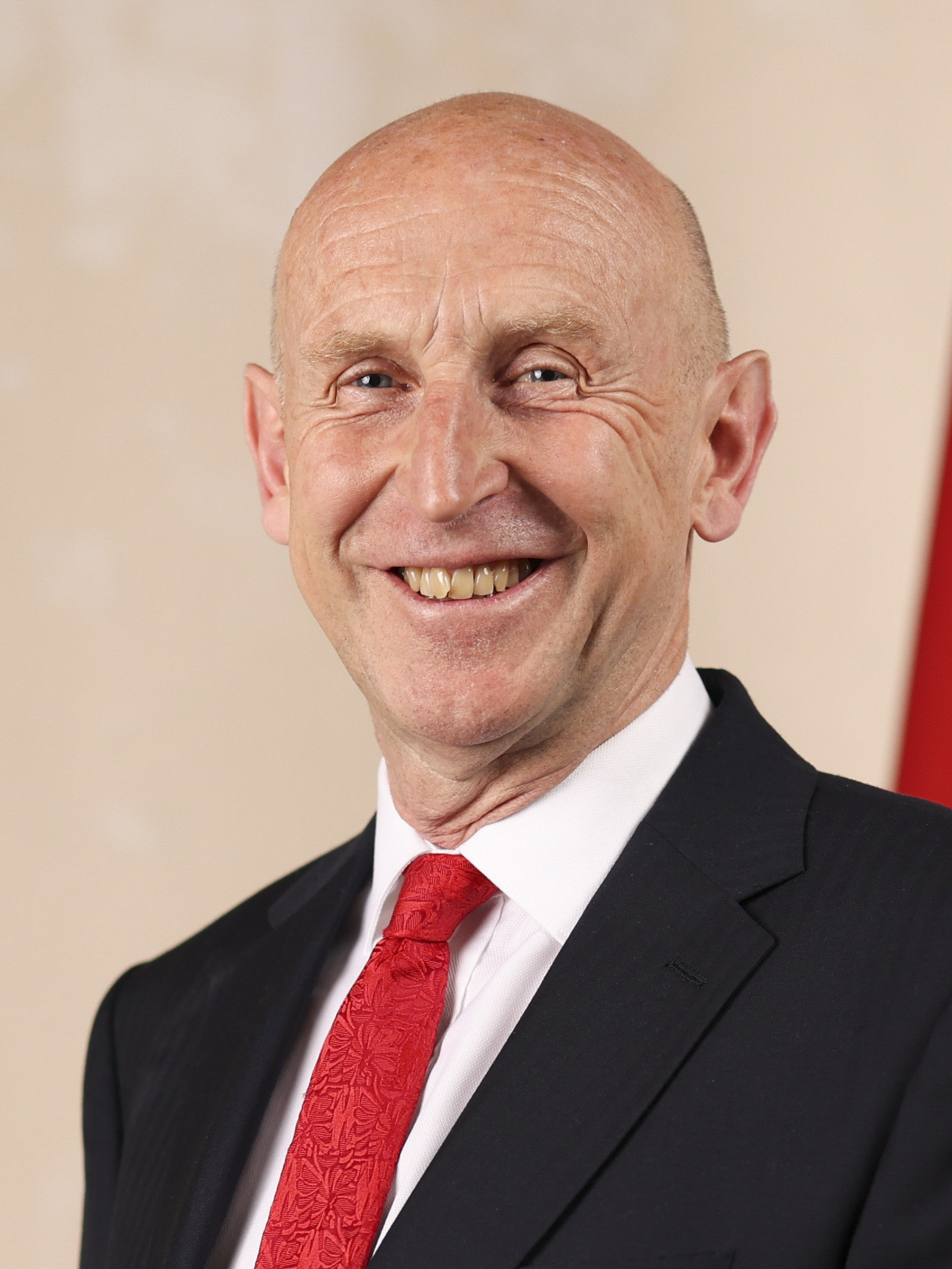
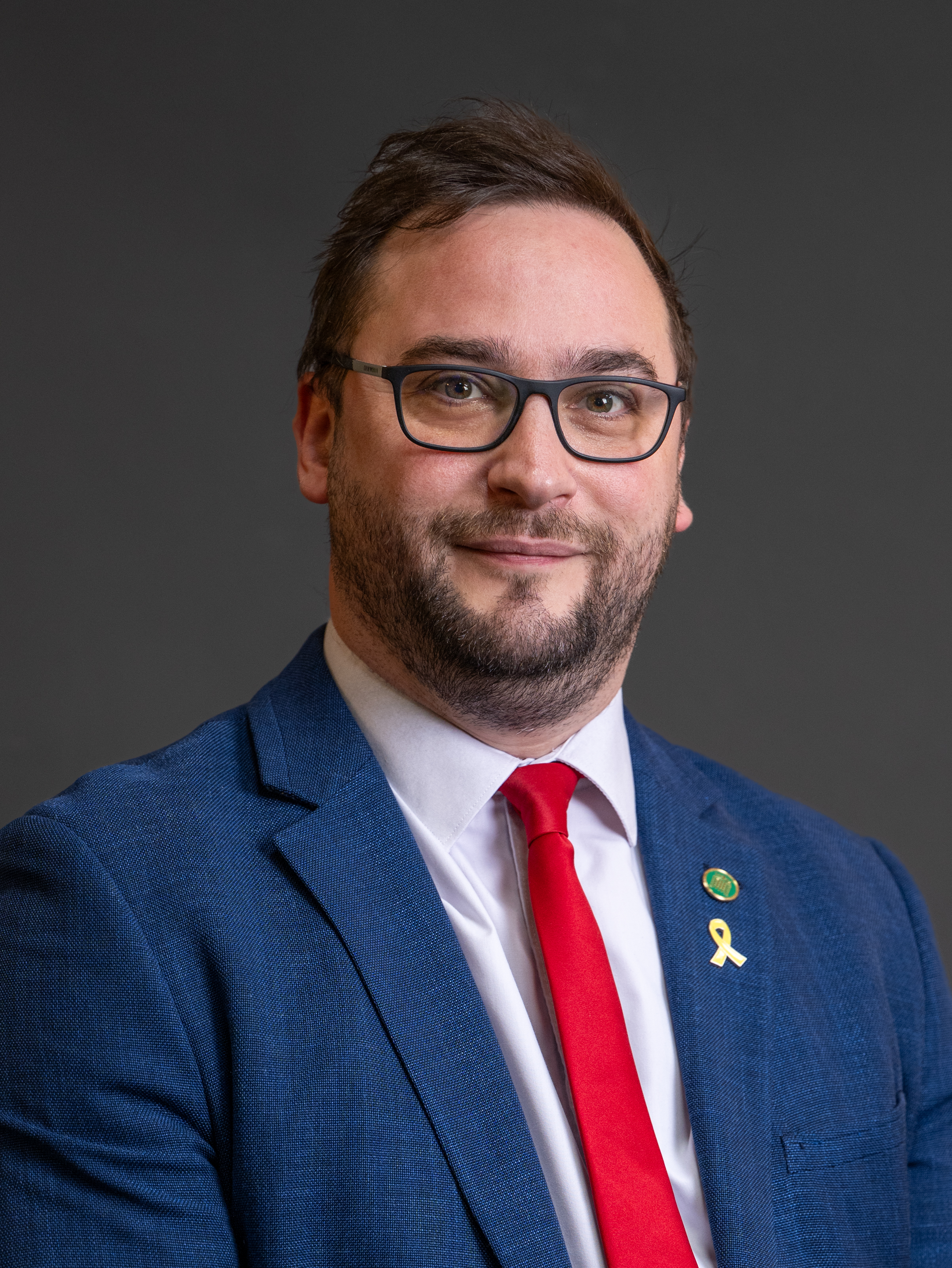
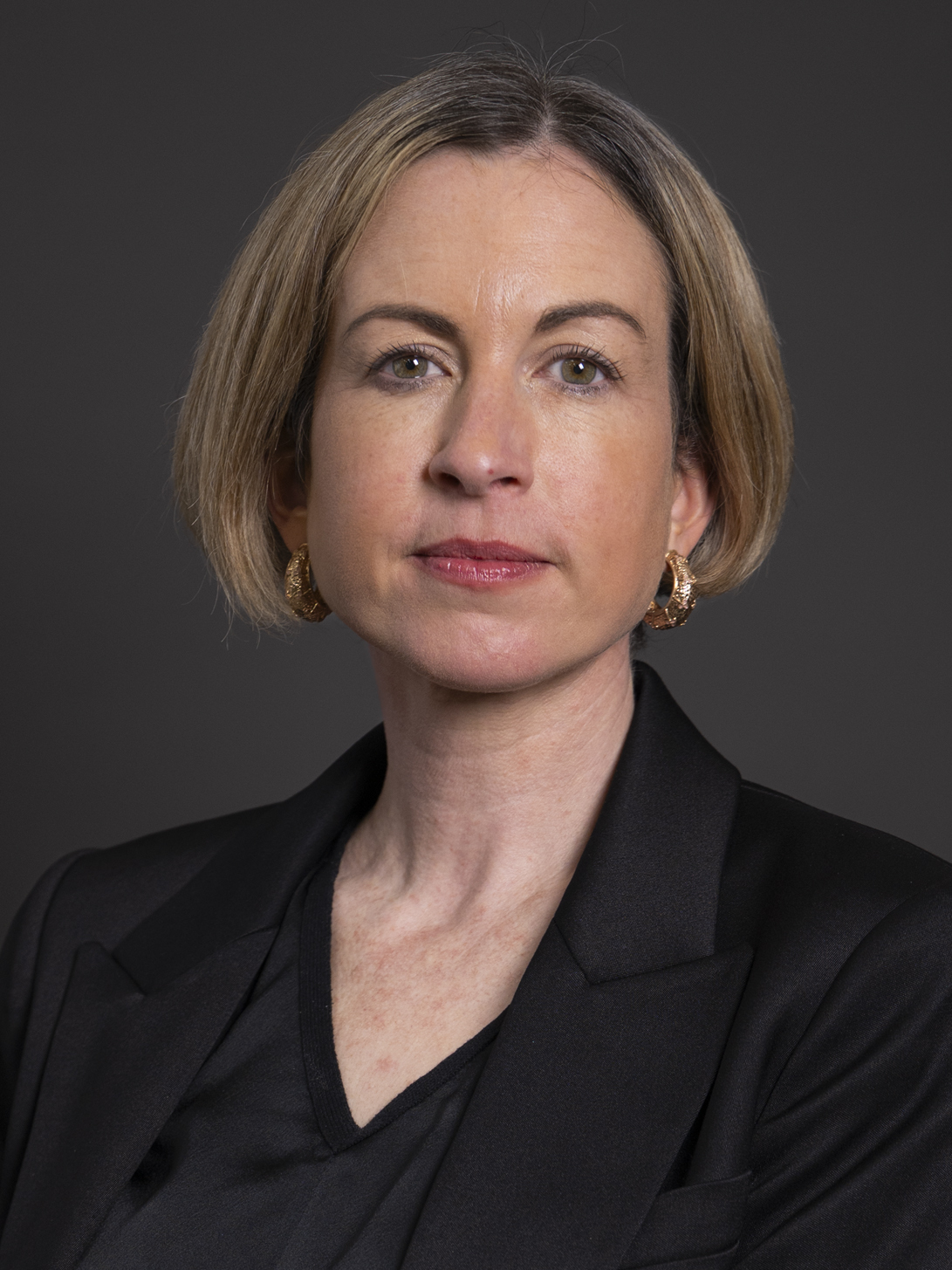
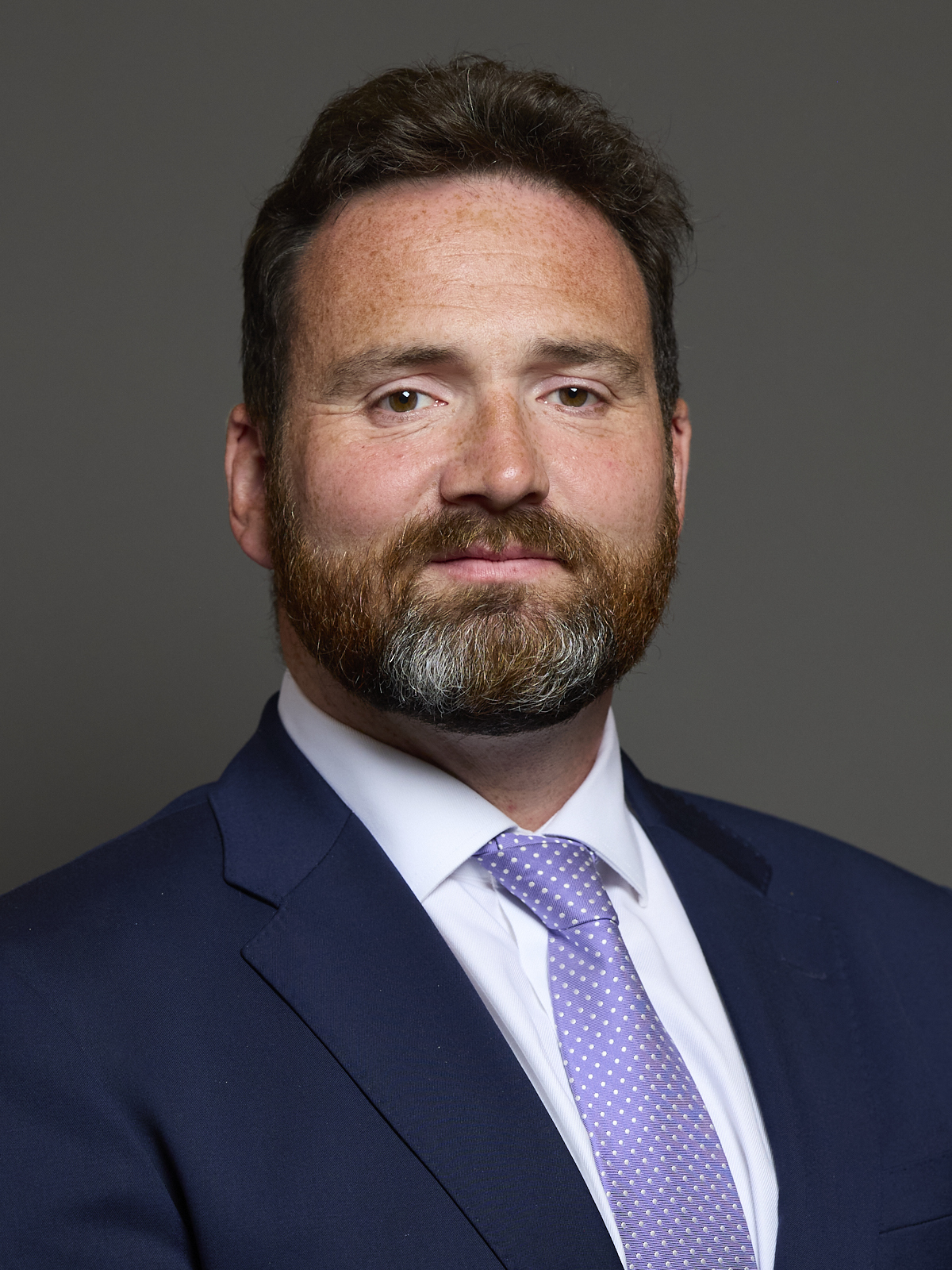
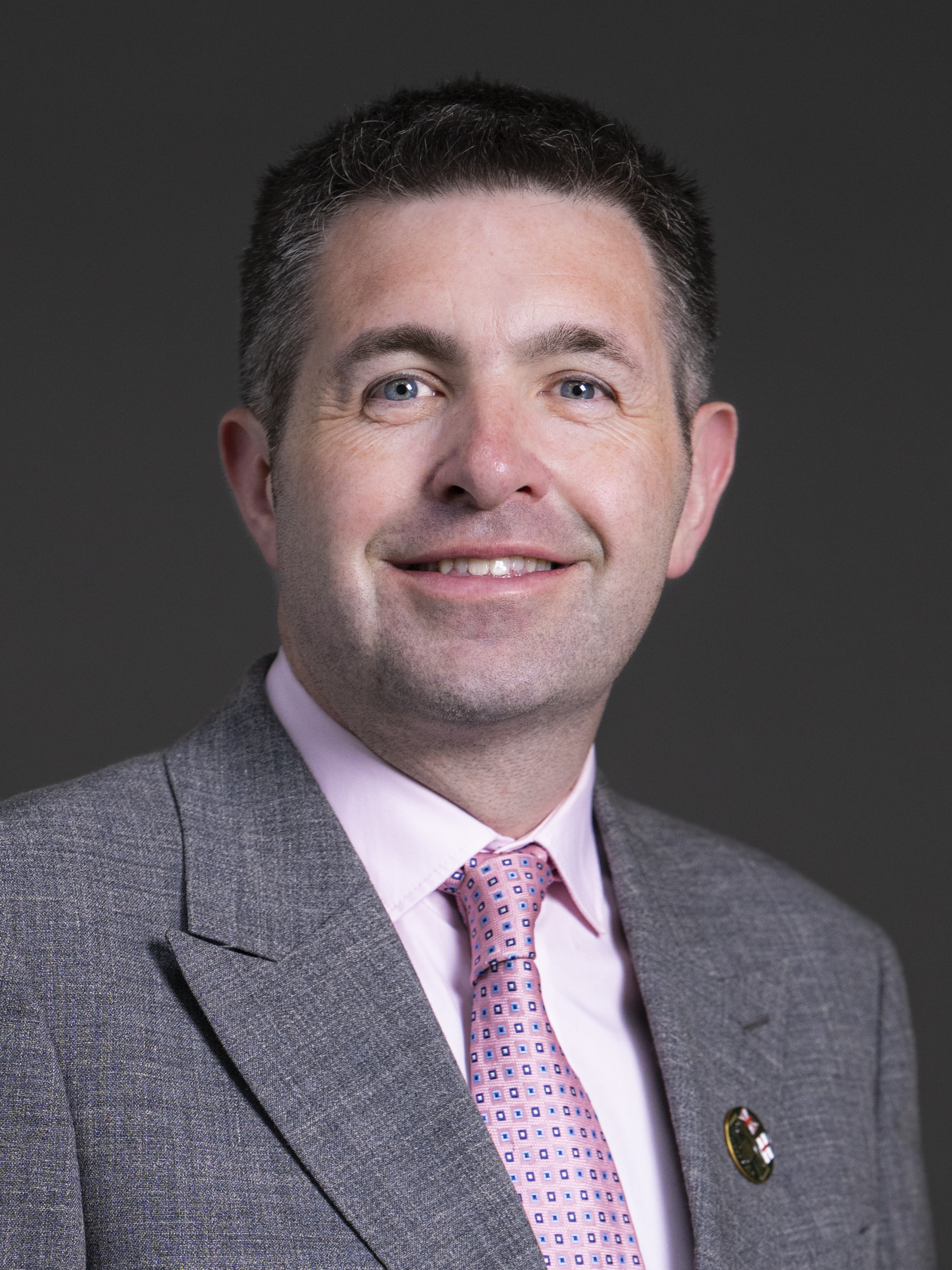
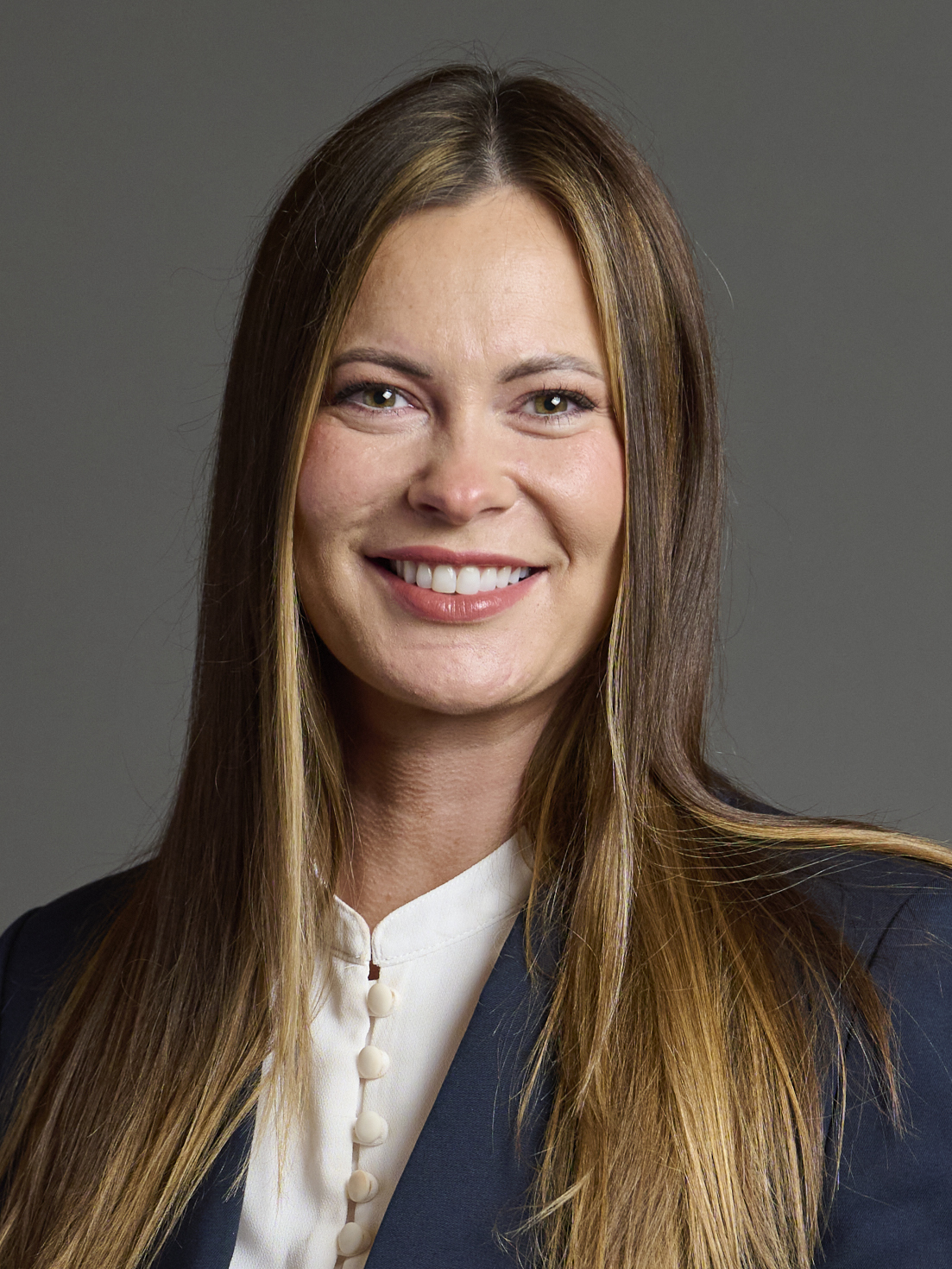
- Incumbent; Andy Burnham, John Healey, Christian Wakeford, Claire Hughes, Gregor Poynton, Shaun Davies, Jade Botterill
- Appointer: The Monarch on the advice of the Prime Minister
- Term length: At His Majesty's pleasure

In the United Kingdom there are at least six lords commissioners of His Majesty's Treasury, serving as a commission for the ancient office of treasurer of the exchequer. The board consists of the first lord of the treasury, the second lord of the treasury, and four or more junior lords acting as whips in the House of Commons to whom this title is usually applied.

It is commonly thought that the lords commissioners of HM Treasury serve as commissioners for exercising the office of Lord High Treasurer; however, this is not true. The confusion arises because both offices used to be held by the same individual at the same time.

Strictly, they are commissioners for exercising the office of Treasurer of the Exchequer of Great Britain and Lord High Treasurer of Ireland (similar to the status of the Lords Commissioners of the Admiralty exercising the office of Lord High Admiral until 1964, when Elizabeth II resumed the office). These offices (excluding Lord High Treasurer of Ireland, which went into commission in 1817) have continually been in commission since the resignation in 1714 of Charles Talbot, 1st Duke of Shrewsbury, who was appointed to the office by Queen Anne on her deathbed.

Until the 19th century, this commission made most of the economic decisions of Great Britain (England, before the Act of Union 1707). However, starting during the 19th century, these positions became sinecure positions, with the First Lord serving almost invariably as Prime Minister, the Second Lord invariably as Chancellor of the Exchequer, and the junior lords serving as whips in Parliament.

As an office in commission, technically all Lords Commissioners of the Treasury are of equal rank, with their ordinal numbers connoting seniority rather than authority over their fellow Lords Commissioners. However, from at least the reign of Queen Anne, de facto power has rested with the top-numbered Lords.

== Current officeholders ==
Portfolio	Name
First Lord of the Treasury	Andy Burnham
Second Lord of the Treasury	John Healey
Junior Lords	Christian Wakeford
Junior Lords	Claire Hughes
Junior Lords	Gregor Poynton
Junior Lords	Shaun Davies
Junior Lords	Jade Botterill

== Relationship with Ministers of HM Treasury ==
Of all the Lords Commissioners of the Treasury, typically the only one who actually works in HM Treasury is the Second Lord, as Chancellor of the Exchequer. Since the formation of the office of Prime Minister (including in the case of Sir Robert Walpole as the inaugural holder), it has been typical for the incumbent to assume also the position of First Lord of the Treasury.

None of the other lords of the Treasury works for the Treasury in a substantive sense. Rather they are government whips, given nominal positions in the Treasury to enable them to be suitably remunerated for facilitating the function of His Majesty's Government. The Commission of the Treasury is suitably flexible for the government's whip operation because it has no fixed number of office-holders. However, the Chief Whip is not personally a lord of the Treasury, instead having the similar, but discrete, position of Parliamentary Secretary to the Treasury, which is also a sinecure used to procure paid membership among the members of the Government.

The lords of the Treasury nominally head HM Treasury. They do so by virtue of office and as a matter of law, acting in the office of Treasurer of the Exchequer. The Chancellor does so in reality, consulting the Prime Minister, and delegating parliamentary-level work to the other ministers in the Treasury, none of whom is a Lord of the Treasury, who negotiate and formulate the rest of Treasury business. These junior ministerial positions are, in descending order of rank:

- Chief Secretary to the Treasury (effectively a Cabinet member, as the incumbent always has the right to attend meetings if not a full, statutory member)
- Financial Secretary to the Treasury (often paired with the office of Paymaster General, which is not always allocated to the Treasury)
- Commercial Secretary to the Treasury
- Economic Secretary to the Treasury
- Exchequer Secretary to the Treasury

== Relationship between the First and Second Lords ==
Historically, the Chancellor of the Exchequer was also the First Lord of the Treasury, and usually by extension Prime Minister as well. However, the increasing sophistication of government spending led to the development of the chancellorship into a more refined position of finance minister, and so gradually particularised the office in a way less suitable for headship of the ministry overall. The last Chancellor-Prime Minister was Stanley Baldwin in 1923, and then only very briefly – the last substantive overlap was William Gladstone in 1880–1882.

A more immediately significant trend though was the rebalancing of the powers of the Houses of Parliament in favour of the lower house. From the Glorious Revolution and onwards it had become increasingly constitutionally untenable for the person setting fiscal policy (i.e. the Chancellor) to reside in the House of Lords, a principle which was embedded permanently in the constitution from 1718 with the resignation of James Stanhope, 1st Earl Stanhope (note this excepts the brief tenures of certain Lord Chief Justices, who historically assumed the office of Chancellor of the Exchequer pro tempore during vacancies, and who were often peers). That notwithstanding, the constitutional convention mandating that the Prime Minister reside in the Commons became embedded much later, with a Prime Minister serving without difficulty from the Lords as late as 1902. That Alec Douglas-Home, the last to assume the Premiership from the Lords in 1963, felt compelled to disclaim his peerage and take up a seat in the Commons shows that the convention had, by that time, become well-entrenched.

Throughout the eighteenth and nineteenth centuries Prime Ministers would continue to be drawn regularly from the upper house. In circumstances where the Prime Minister was a peer it was felt appropriate for the head of the ministry overall to take the primus inter pares position on the commission as First Lord, even if through constitutional convention he couldn't serve as the Chancellor, who was otherwise First Lord by virtue of his office. The office of First Lord thus became strongly intertwined with the (legally non-existent) Premiership was particularly strong because all Prime Ministers up to Robert Gascoyne-Cecil, 3rd Marquess of Salisbury, apart from William Pitt, 1st Earl of Chatham, had been First Lords. Accordingly, when the Prime Minister sat in the Lords, the Chancellor assumed the Second Lordship. The constitutional entrenchment of this principle began in 1841 with the appointment of the Second Peel ministry. Being a viscount, William Lamb, 2nd Viscount Melbourne (the outgoing Prime Minister) had not been able to be Chancellor as well, but nevertheless assumed the First Lordship pursuant to his premiership in the usual way for premiers from the peerage. However, when Sir Robert Peel returned to office for his non-consecutive second term he elected to be First Lord of Treasury, a title he had naturally assumed in his first ministry wherein he had also served as Chancellor. But despite being a Member of Parliament (i.e. not a Lord), Peel did not assume the Chancellorship. Thus the Chancellor, Henry Goulburn, became the first Chancellor to be Second Lord of the Treasury whilst the First Lord was also in the Commons. From that point onwards, the Second Lordship, save on the rare occasion that the Prime Minister holds both 10 and 11 Downing Street, has been permanently vested in the Chancellor.

== Relationship between the First Lord of the Treasury and the Prime Minister ==
Since the evolution of the position, the Prime Minister has also served as First Lord of the Treasury in all but two cases. The initial linkage of the two offices is not surprising, since at the formation of the office the First Lord of the Treasury did indeed take part in running the Treasury, and as First Lord was the most senior person so tasked. Since control of money usually granted most power, it is not surprising that such a person would head the government as a whole. Indeed, even after decades of the emergence of the premiership, William Pitt the Younger proffered that the Prime Minister "ought to be the person at the head of the finances."

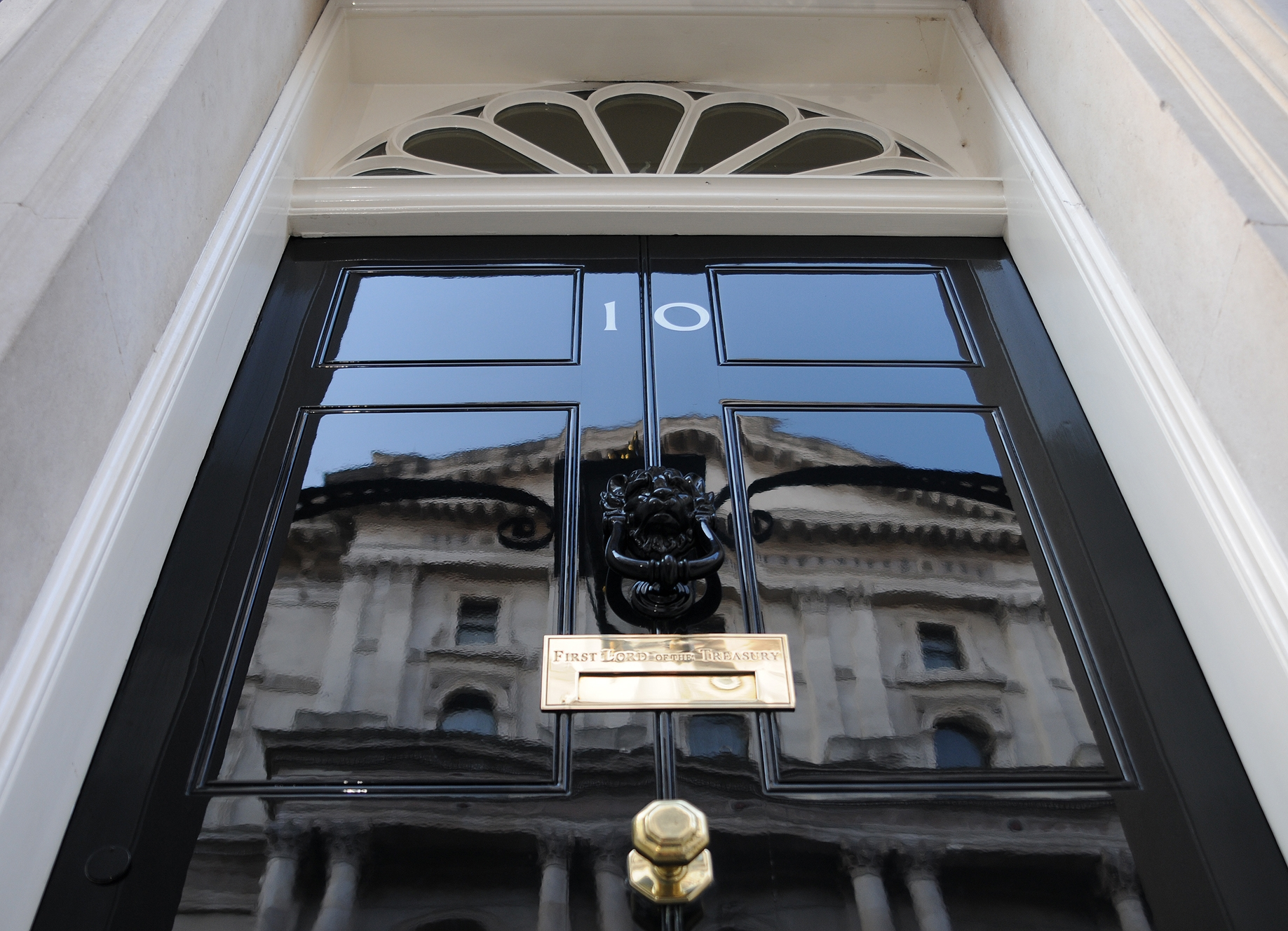
The door of 10 Downing Street, with "First Lord of the Treasury" inscribed on the letterbox as the addressee for post

The two exceptions were Lord Chatham and Lord Salisbury. During Chatham's ministry of 1766–68 he occupied the office of Lord Keeper of the Privy Seal instead. Lord Salisbury became First Lord neither during his first term (1885–1886) nor his third (1895–1902), though he did become First Lord for the first two years of his second ministry (1886–1892).

Since Salisbury, the two roles have become completely concomitant, so much so that the Prime Minister's official residence, 10 Downing Street, is in fact the official residence of the First Lord of the Treasury, which title is named on the letter box. Salisbury, as a marquess of vast independent wealth, had no use of an official residence, instead living in his grander town house at 20 Arlington Street in St James's, and could instead bestow it as a perquisite to other ministers, along with the First Lordship itself.

Other positions have been linked to the Prime Ministership as well. Continuously since 1968, when the position was created by Harold Wilson, the Prime Minister has also served as Minister for the Civil Service. The adoption of this additional position was directly linked to reforms to HM Treasury, being created when responsibilities for the pay and management of the civil service was transferred from the Treasury to a new Civil Service Department. Since the Prime Minister was a Lord Commissioner of the Treasury, prior to the reform he had had ex officio oversight of these portfolios, but it was felt more proper for the civil service to be held outside of a particularised department. Nevertheless, in recognition of the primary authority of the Prime Minister over the Civil Service, it is a constitutional convention that the Ministry would always be held by the Prime Minister. Though the Civil Service Department was abolished by Margaret Thatcher in 1982, the title was retained. Whereas the First Lordship of the Treasury has been a complete sinecure for some time, the functions of the Minister for the Civil Service have at times required the Prime Minister to discharge policy and be held accountable for it. For instance, it was occupying this role which saw the Prime Minister sued for her policies in Council of Civil Service Unions v Minister for the Civil Service.

Other offices have historically been linked to the Prime Ministership but are no longer. Until Clement Attlee became Prime Minister, the vast majority of premiers had served as either Leader of the House of Commons or Leader of the House of Lords depending on the chamber in which they sat. As the power of the executive swelled, the need to have a legislative-oriented office receded. In 1942 during the Second World War Winston Churchill had made himself Minister of Defence, a title Prime Ministers would hold for thirteen years thereafter, but with the decline of defence as an urgent policy area this was abandoned by Sir Anthony Eden when he came to office in 1955. Boris Johnson held the position of Minister for the Union, which he created to display his commitment to strengthening the bond of the four nations of the United Kingdom. This role was retained by his successor Liz Truss.

Accordingly, the First Lord of the Treasury is the title most associated with the Prime Ministership. Seven Prime Ministers saw fit to occupy the post of First Lord of the Treasury only, and held no other subsidiary office. Those Prime Ministers were Charles Watson-Wentworth, 2nd Marquess of Rockingham (1782), William Cavendish-Bentinck, 3rd Duke of Portland (1807–1809), David Lloyd George (1916–1922), Sir Anthony Eden (1955–57), Harold Macmillan (1957–1963), Sir Alec Douglas-Home (1963–1964), and Harold Wilson (1964–1968, at which point he also became Minister for the Civil Service).

== See also ==
- List of lords commissioners of the Treasury since 1714
- List of lord high treasurers of England and Great Britain – includes a list of former lords commissioners of the Treasury until 1714
- Secretary to the Treasury
