= South Elmsall railway station =

Railway station in West Yorkshire, England

South Elmsall
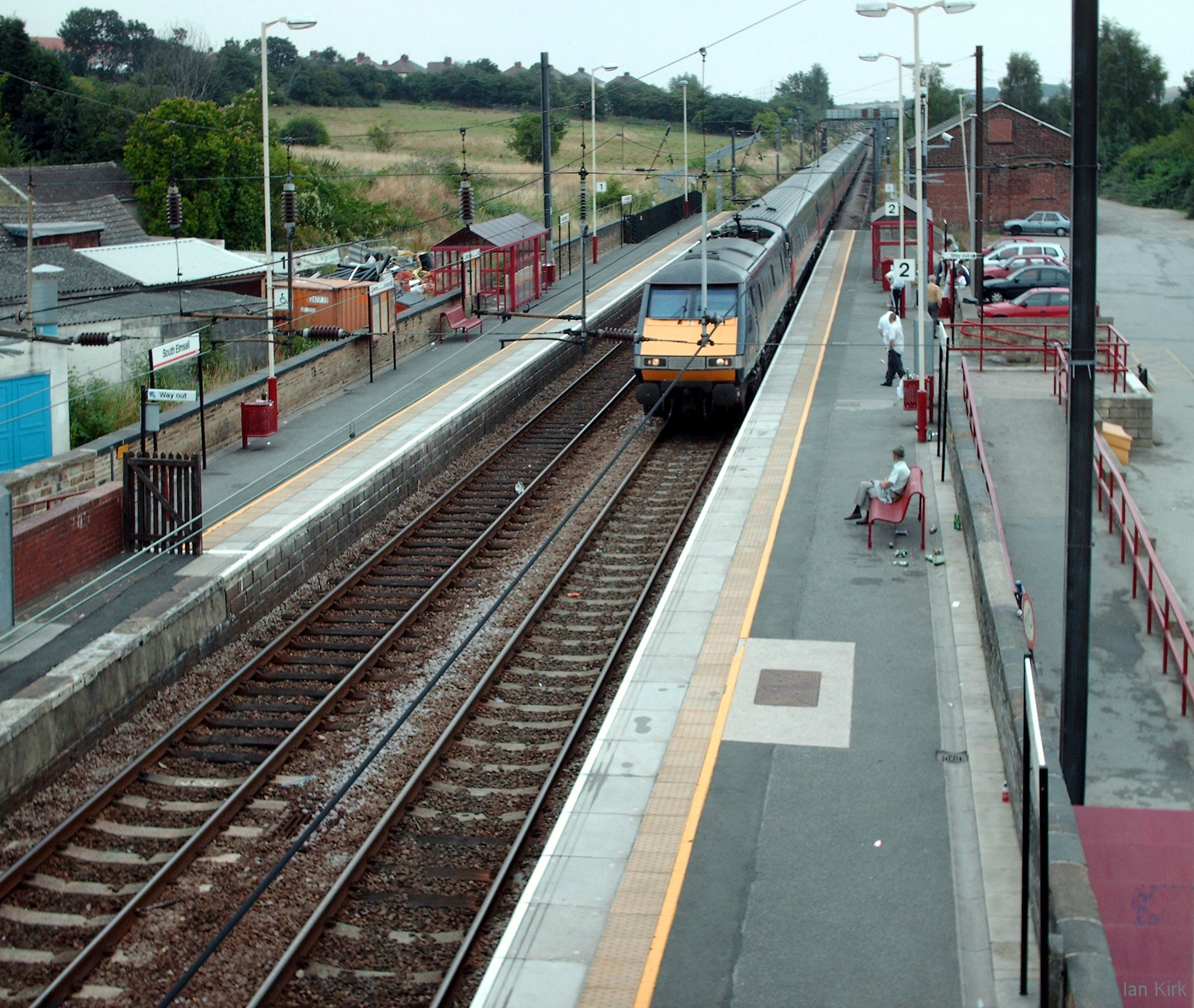
- Class 91 from King's Cross passing through South Elmsall station at speed

General information
- Location: South Elmsall, City of Wakefield; England
- Coordinates: 53.5948°N 1.2854°W
- Grid reference: SE473111
- Manager: Northern Trains
- Transit authority: West Yorkshire Metro
- Platforms: 2

Other information
- Station code: SES
- Fare zone: 5 (WYPTE) & Doncaster (SYPTE)
- Classification: DfT category F1

History
- Opened: 1866

Passengers
- 2020/21: ▼76,922
- 2021/22: ▲0.251 million
- 2022/23: ▲0.268 million
- 2023/24: ▲0.270 million
- 2024/25: ▲0.289 million
Location
Notes
- Passenger statistics from the Office of Rail and Road

South Elmsall railway station serves the town of South Elmsall in West Yorkshire, England. It lies on the Wakefield Line operated by Northern 8 3/4 miles (14.1 km) northwest of Doncaster and was opened in 1866.

== Facilities ==
The station is unstaffed and has had its main buildings (formerly located on the northbound platform) and goods shed demolished. There are waiting shelters on both platforms and there is a self-service ticket machine provided for passengers to buy tickets prior to travelling or collect pre-paid tickets. Digital CIS displays, timetable posters and automatic announcements provide train running information. Step-free access to both platforms is via ramps from the road bridge at the north end.

== Services ==
Mondays to Saturdays there is an hourly service to Leeds via Wakefield Westgate and to Doncaster. On Sundays there is also an hourly service in both directions in the winter 2019 timetable.

The station is less than 1 mile (1.6 km) away from Moorthorpe railway station which means the South Kirkby/South Elmsall area has a half-hourly service towards Leeds right through the week.

There is also a freight-only line to the South Humberside Main Line to Hatfield and Stainforth and beyond (part of the original West Riding and Grimsby Railway) which diverges to the south of the station.

Preceding station	National Rail	Following station
Adwick	Northern Trains Wakefield Line	Fitzwilliam

== Tickets ==
The station is in West Yorkshire but South Yorkshire Passenger Transport Executive tickets are valid to and from this station, on services into South Yorkshire.

The station is located less than 1 mile (1.6 km) away from Frickley Athletic F.C.

The station is featured in the literary works of A. F. Bransdreth who set the final scene of Dim the Lights on the southbound platform.
