= Crofton, West Yorkshire =

Village near Wakefield, West Yorkshire, England

Coordinates: 53.657°N 1.427°W

Crofton
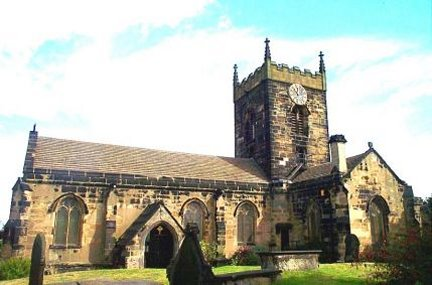

- Location within West Yorkshire
- Population: 5,781 (2011 census)
- OS grid reference: SE374182
- Civil parish: Crofton
- Metropolitan borough: City of Wakefield
- Metropolitan county: West Yorkshire
- Region: Yorkshire and the Humber
- Country: England
- Sovereign state: United Kingdom
- Post town: WAKEFIELD
- Postcode district: WF4
- Dialling code: 01924
- Police: West Yorkshire
- Fire: West Yorkshire
- Ambulance: Yorkshire
- UK Parliament: Normanton and Hemsworth

Crofton is a village in West Yorkshire, England, about 4 miles (6 km) south-east of Wakefield, some 6 miles (10 km) to the west of the town of Pontefract, and 4 miles (6 km) from the town of Featherstone. The population of the civil parish at the 2011 census was 5,781.

== History ==
The name Crofton derives from the Old English crofttūn meaning 'settlement with a croft'.

Crofton is listed in the 1086 Domesday Book as Scroftune.

The village has one church, the cruciform All Saints' Church, which is Anglican. It dates from the 15th century. It shares an incumbent with the Church of St Peter the Apostle at Kirkthorpe. A Roman Catholic church built in the 1920s closed in 2008.

Crofton New Hall was built in the 1750s for the Wilsons, who lived in the village until 1935, when a Colonel Wilson sold out. The hall was used by the army during the Second World War and later by the National Coal Board. It housed Brown's Tutorial School until 1980, when the building was demolished. Shortly afterwards, a housing estate was built there. Some of the Wilson family are buried in a large mausoleum in the cemetery.

Richmal Mangnall, author of an innovative schoolbook, was educated at Mrs Wilson's School at Crofton Hall. She stayed there as a teacher, then took it over in 1808 and ran it until her death on 1 May 1820. The eldest two Brontë sisters (Maria and Elizabeth) briefly attended.

The earliest free school in the village opened in 1877 as Crofton Board School. The building of the earlier school, which had been used by the local high school as a drama hall, was demolished in 2003 and is now the site of a youth centre. A blue plaque dedicated to Miss Magnall was installed on the new building in 2013.

Crofton was predominantly a farming community, but the mining of coal became important in the 19th century and continued until the 1980s. There were three coal mines within two miles of the village, at Nostell, Walton and Sharlston. By the early 1900s, Lord St Oswald had built houses at New Crofton, known locally as Cribbens or Scribbens Lump, for the workers of Nostell Mine. This area was populated until the 1980s, when it was demolished along with the closure of the mines. "The Lump" also had a mission hall, a local shop and a fish-and-chip shop, locally as "The Leaning Chippy" due to subsidence from the local mine at Nostell. In the 1970s, there were two shops near the Lump: "Alf's", which was a corner shop located where the Slipper public house is today, and another attached to the local car garage, "Mrs Moody's". There is also a disused well, from which villagers used to get their water. It can still be seen, but the well itself has since been filled in, as a hazard for local children.

The houses at the Lump were demolished after severe subsidence from Nostell mine, it being was cheaper to do so than to repair the damage the subsidence had caused. Once demolished, the area remained undeveloped for many years, but the old cobbled streets and other roads were still visible. Eventually the land was sold and a new housing estate built on it. Most of the old subsidence has ceased, with many of the old mines collapsed and filled in years ago, but some remain and could affect surrounding areas for years to come.

When the miners at Nostell were clearing new coal seams, they claimed that they came across what was described as an underground church, which the monks from Nostell Priory had built years before. This church was complete with tunnels, which the monks used to use for transporting coal to the monastery. The church had wooden doors and seating inside. Exactly why they built it underground is unclear. The entrance and tunnel was eventually sealed off. Local miner and Nostell safety officer Leslie Simpson Sr and a fellow miner carved their names into the wood of the church door just before the tunnel was sealed. One theory is that the monks built the underground church to pray and worship in private, the monastery attached to Nostell Priory being dissolved by Henry VIII in 1540.

=== Crofton Castle ===
Crofton Castle was built in Towers Lane in 1853 by John Blackburn in the style of a Gothic manor house, complete with a parapet. The house acted as a prisoner-of-war camp during the Second World War for captured Italian soldiers. The house was then bought by the Abbott family, who allowed it to fall into disrepair. In 2004 the house suffered a blaze that led to its demolition.

Rumours of hauntings and paranormal activity at the mansion surfaced. Many schoolchildren and some adults have reported seeing a white figure standing at the back window, locally known as the Grey Lady. Over the years, there were rumours of suicides and hangings in and around the castle, but most were unsubstantiated or exaggerated. Since the castle was demolished, a new housing estate has been built on the site, but the developers were mindful of the stories behind the castle and so planned the new estate that no houses would occupy exactly the same position as the castle had, which is nowadays covered by a road. Even so, events from the legend of the Grey Lady and other strange phenomena are still being reported from the new estate.

== Crofton today ==
Today, Crofton is seen as a commuting village, with many inhabitants leaving daily to work in nearby cities such as Leeds and Wakefield and to a lesser degree Sheffield and York. The village has two post offices, one in New Crofton and one in the High Street, two fish and chip shops – one in New Crofton – mini-markets and a carpet store. The village also boasts several pubs: the Cock and Crown, on the A638 road, the Royal Oak, and The Manor. Also serving drink are a working men's club and the Crofton Community Centre, formerly known as the Nostell Miners' Welfare. The Weavers Green has been demolished to make way for new houses, and The Slipper has been converted into flats. The Grade II listed "Manor" formerly known as the "Goose and Cowslip" has undergone major renovations.

Crofton is known as the location of the Redbeck Motel, a hotel and diner located on the A638. The motel was established in 1969 and operated 24 hours a day, 365 days a year. The Redbeck's doors famously did not even have locks fitted, since the business never closed, however it was eventually forced to shut its doors for six months during the national lockdown which accompanied the COVID-19 pandemic. A local outcry ensued after plans were announced to demolish the Redbeck in order to build 90 new homes on the site. The Wakefield Civic Society argued that the building should be saved due to its "literary significance", having featured in the novels of local author, David Peace. Over the course of its history, the Redbeck Motel also featured in the television soap Emmerdale, and hosted celebrities such as Tom Jones, Shirley Bassey and Diana Ross.

Crofton has had a makeover in the last few years. The old Nostell mine and its surrounding area have been transformed into a nature park, with a small pond and walking areas that many locals use. The walk comprises around 3–4 miles of ash path, with some being concreted (remnants of the old opencast mining area). It can be followed on foot or by bike, right to the Trans-Pennine Trail and through Walton Forest. Use in some years is marred by surges in the tick population, which particularly affect dog walkers and farm cattle.

In July 2017, the Secretary of State for Transport announced that the eastern leg of the future HS2 high-speed rail link, which was to run between the West Midlands and Leeds, would be routed through Crofton. The plans also included the building of a rolling stock depot in the village, however after local pushback, the decision was made for this to be located in Leeds instead. In November 2021, however, the government announced that the eastern leg of HS2 was to be scrapped entirely.

== Sport ==
Crofton is in the centre of what is locally known as Rugby Land, with the local team Crofton Cougars contributing to the maintenance of the rugby league tradition. It was formed in 1996 and plays in the CMS Unison Division 1. It won the CMS Division 2 title in 2006. The home ground of the Cougars is Cougar Park, which is part of the Crofton Community Centre facilities.

Crofton cricket team play at The Sidings Playing Fields, as do Crofton Juniors AFC and Crofton Sports FC, which has two teams playing in the Wakefield Saturday League and are based at the Weavers Green pub.

Nostell Miners Welfare F.C. also play at the community centre facilities and are currently in the Northern Counties Premier division.

== Notable residents ==
In birth order:

- Richard Fleming (c. 1385–1431), later Bishop of Lincoln and the founder of Lincoln College, Oxford, built Crofton Church.
- John Harrison (1693–1776), the man who solved the problem of calculating longitude, was born in Foulby. Harrison Road in Crofton is named after him.
- Richmal Mangnall (1769–1820), headmistress of Crofton School for Young Girls, wrote a once-famous textbook, Mangnall's Questions.
- Sir Titus Salt (1803–1876), who built the mills of Saltaire, lived on Manor Farm (now a pub).
- Edward Simpson (1867–1944), born in Crofton, was a first-class cricketer.
- Harry Roberts (1904–1968), born in Crofton, was a professional footballer with Leeds United, Plymouth Argyle and Bristol Rovers.
- Joby Shaw (c. 1934–2010), born in Crofton, was an international rugby league footballer.

== Schools ==
Crofton Infants School was opened in 1877, then known as Crofton Board School.

In 1920 Edwin Sowerby murdered his former girlfriend, 19-year-old Jane Darwell, at Crofton School in front of several witnesses. Sowerby was sentenced to death and hanged at Armley Prison in Leeds on 30 December 1920. A later student relates that the children of Crofton Hall School were convinced the building was haunted.

In 1955, Crofton Secondary School opened in the Old Hall. Crofton Slack Lane Junior School and Crofton High School were built in the 1960s. A Junior and Infant school opened in Shay Lane in 1972. In summer 1995 a fire destroyed most of the High School; a new school opened in 1998. In 2007 Crofton High School scored GCSE pass rates that put it in the country's top 100 state schools. In August 2011 it became Crofton Academy.

== Transport ==
=== Bus ===
Crofton is located on the A638 road that runs between Wakefield and Doncaster and serves as the village's lifeline. There are several bus routes which run from Crofton:

- 148, Arriva Yorkshire – Wakefield to Knottingley and Pontefract via Crofton.
- 195/196, Arriva Yorkshire – Wakefield to Hemsworth via Crofton and Walton.
- 485, CT Plus – Wakefield to South Elmsall via Ackworth Crofton and Agbrigg.
- 496, Arriva Yorkshire – Wakefield to Upton via Belle Vue, Crofton and South Elmsall.
- The P2/2x/6, Poppletons Coaches – Pontefract to Wakefield via NEW College, North Featherstone, Ackton, Sharlston, Crofton and Walton (College Students Only).

=== Train ===
Until the 1960s the village was served by the Hare Park & Crofton railway station before it was demolished. It stood on the Great Northern Railway and on the Wakefield Line. The sidings were also used as part of the Dearne Valley Line. Crofton, a smaller station, stood next to Doncaster Road, on the current Pontefract Line, behind the Crofton Arms pub. That station too was closed in 1931, but derelict remains of the station building can be seen from the A638 and from trains between Wakefield Kirkgate railway station and Pontefract.

=== Air ===
Crofton is located 26 miles (42 km) from Leeds Bradford Airport, which has flights to European and Asian destinations such as Paris, Milan, Rome, Alicante, Tenerife, Larnaca and Islamabad. The nearest international airport is Manchester, 69 miles (111 km) from the village.

== See also ==
- Listed buildings in Crofton, West Yorkshire
