= Fitzwilliam railway station =

Railway station in West Yorkshire, England

Fitzwilliam
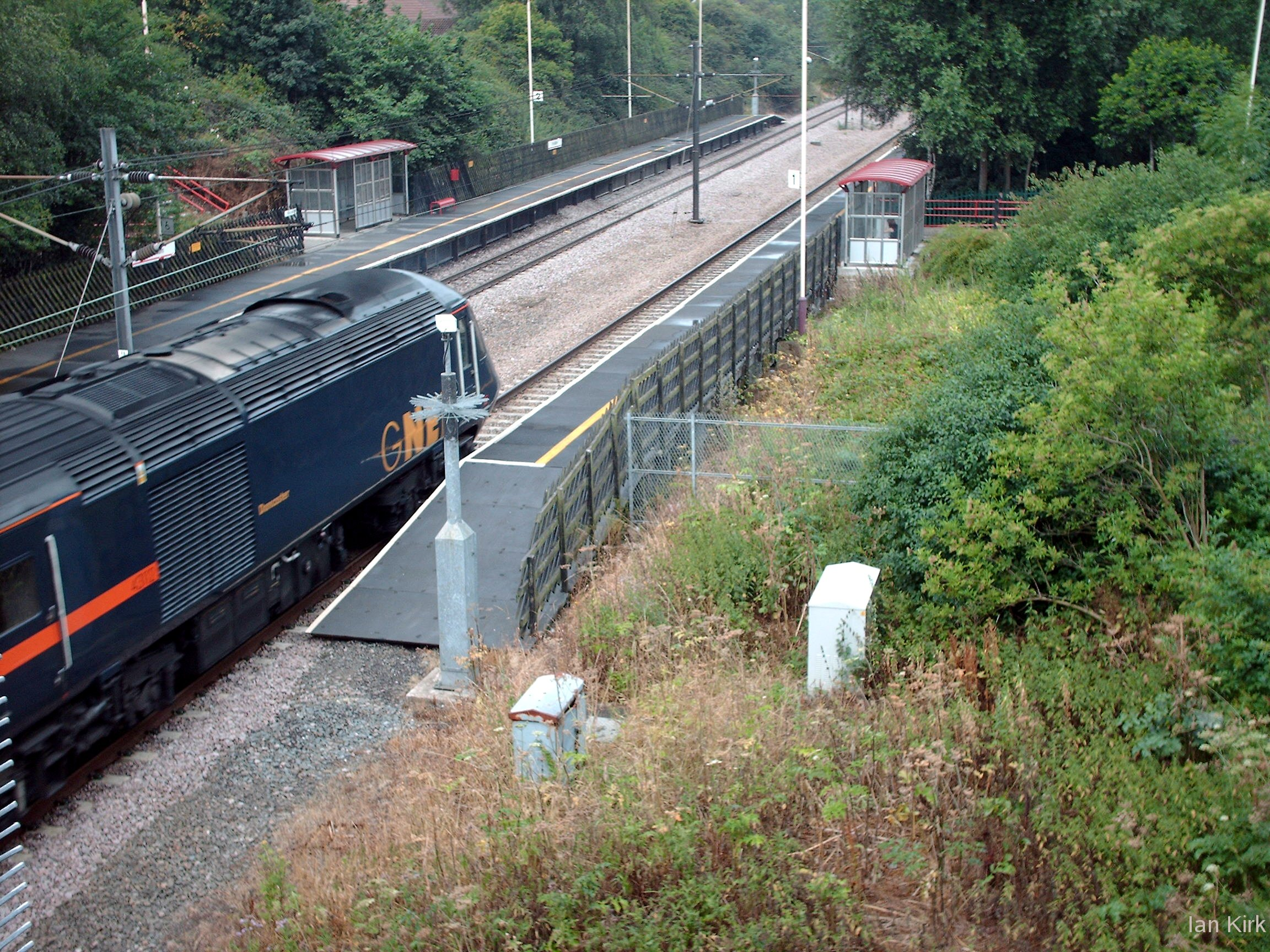
- 43112 Doncaster passing through at speed in July 2006

General information
- Location: Fitzwilliam, City of Wakefield; England
- Coordinates: 53.6326°N 1.3745°W
- Grid reference: SE414153
- Managed by: Northern Trains
- Transit authority: West Yorkshire (Metro)
- Platforms: 2

Other information
- Station code: FZW
- Fare zone: 4
- Classification: DfT category F1

Key dates
- 1 June 1937: Original station opened as "Fitzwilliam Halt"
- 6 November 1967: Original station closed
- 1 March 1982: New station opened

Passengers
- 2020/21: ▼78,978
- Interchange: ▼184
- 2021/22: ▲0.198 million
- Interchange: ▲402
- 2022/23: ▲0.239 million
- Interchange: ▲833
- 2023/24: ▲0.243 million
- Interchange: ▼810
- 2024/25: ▲0.273 million
- Interchange: ▼723
Location
Notes
- Passenger statistics from the Office of Rail and Road

Fitzwilliam railway station is in the small village of Fitzwilliam, West Yorkshire, England. It is also the closest station to the nearby town of Hemsworth.

The station is on the Wakefield Line operated by Northern. Trains run from Fitzwilliam to Leeds via Wakefield Westgate, Doncaster and Sheffield.

The current station was opened on 1 March 1982 as one of series of improvements to local rail services made by the West Yorkshire PTE (Passenger Transport Executive). This replaced the LNER station several hundred metres to the north, which opened as "Fitzwilliam Halt" on 1 July 1937 but fell victim to the Beeching cuts within little more than 30 years, closing on 6 November 1967. Unlike its modern incarnation, the original station consisted of a single island platform, accessed from the adjacent road bridge. The line was electrified in 1988.

== Facilities ==
The station is unstaffed and has two wooden platforms, with waiting shelters on each side. There is a ticket machine in place to allow intending passengers to buy these prior to boarding or collect advance purchase tickets. A customer help point is located on platform 2 and running information is also provided by means of digital CIS displays, timetable posters and automated train announcements. Step-free access to both platforms is possible via ramps from the main road.

== Services ==
On Mondays to Saturdays, two trains per hour operate towards Wakefield Westgate and Leeds, while an hourly service operates to both Doncaster and Sheffield.

On Sundays, the same frequency operates as during the week (since the May 2019 timetable change), but starting later in the day.

Preceding station	National Rail	Following station
Moorthorpe	Northern Trains Wakefield Line	Sandal and Agbrigg
South Elmsall	Northern Trains Wakefield Line	Sandal and Agbrigg
Historical railways
Hemsworth	Great Northern Railway West Riding and Grimsby Railway	Nostell
