= West Riding and Grimsby Railway =

British railway company

The West Riding and Grimsby Railway (WR&GR) was a railway company that promoted a line between Wakefield and Doncaster, in Yorkshire, England. There was also a branch line connection from Adwick le Street to Stainforth, which gave access towards Grimsby. The company was promoted independently, but it was sponsored by the Manchester, Sheffield and Lincolnshire Railway (MS&LR) and the Great Northern Railway (GNR), and became jointly owned by them.

The line opened in 1866. It was hugely beneficial to the GNR, shortening its route for express passenger trains from Doncaster to Leeds by twenty minutes, an outcome long sought by the GNR. For the MS&LR it gave a direct connection between the manufacturing districts of West Yorkshire and the docks at Grimsby.

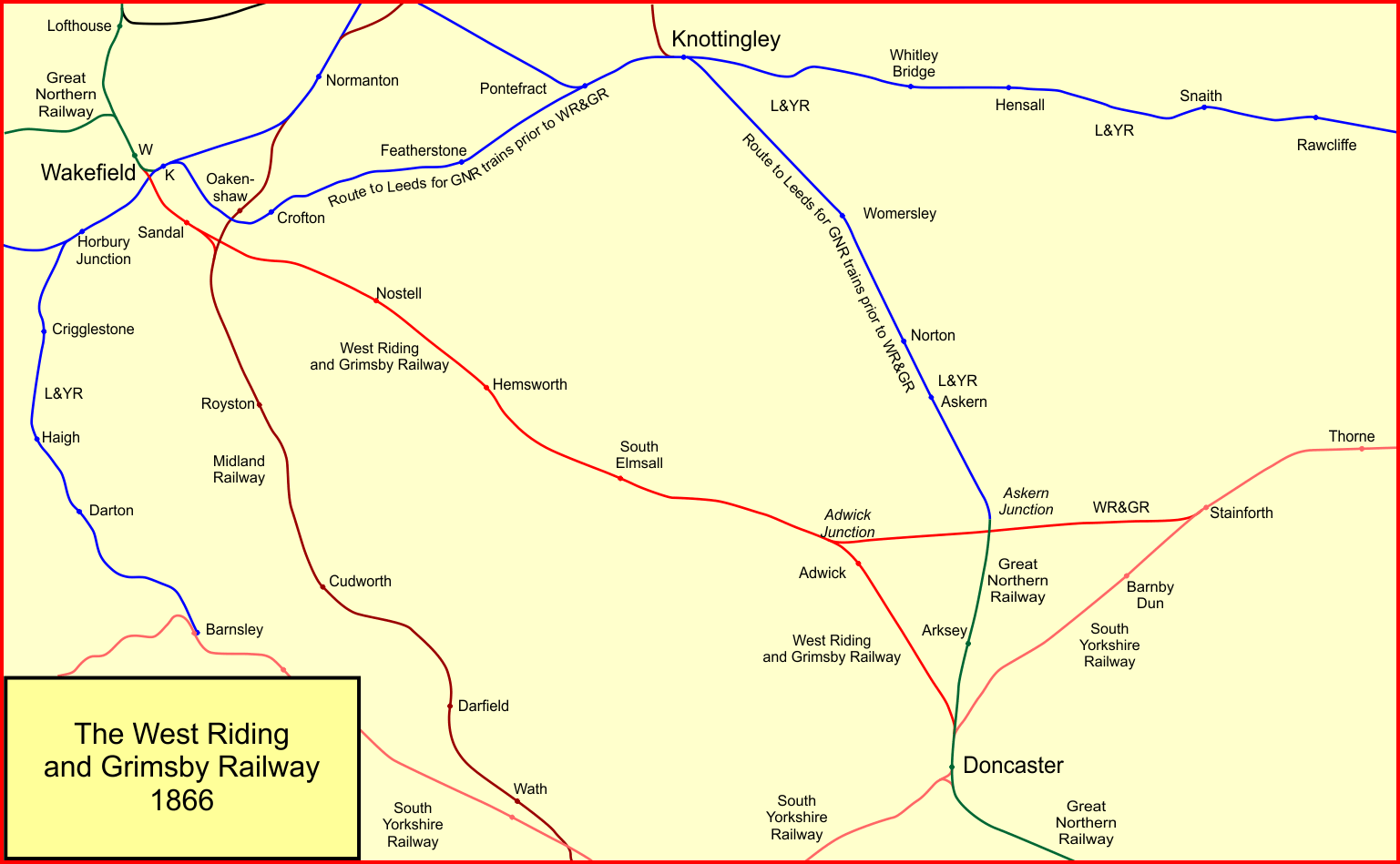
The West Riding and Grimsby Railway in 1866

The line passed into the ownership of the London and North Eastern Railway at the "Grouping" of 1923. It was electrified in 1988, and today is part of the main route for passenger expresses from London to Leeds.

== Origins ==
The Great Northern Railway was authorised by Parliament in 1846, to build a railway line from London to York. Its promoters had hoped to be able to make a branch from Doncaster to Leeds, but that was refused by Parliament. Leeds and the surrounding district was a major centre of importance to the GNR, and to enable its trains to reach it, the GNR had to make agreements with other, competing, lines, and to run by a rather roundabout route via Knottingley and Methley.

The Bradford, Wakefield and Leeds Railway had been opened in 1857, and was worked by the Great Northern Railway; this gave the GNR a direct line from Wakefield to Leeds, but the gap from Doncaster to Wakefield remained, necessitating running on the lines of the Lancashire and Yorkshire Railway (L&YR).

West Riding and Grimsby Railway Act 1862
- Act of Parliament
- Parliament of the United Kingdom
- Long title: An Act to authorize the Construction of a Railway from the Bradford, Wakefield, and Leeds Railway at Wakefield to the South Yorkshire Railway at Barnby-upon-Don, and of certain Branch Railways, to be called "The West Riding and Grimsby Railway."
- Citation: 25 & 26 Vict. c. ccxi

Dates
- Royal assent: 7 August 1862

The GNR had repeatedly submitted parliamentary bills seeking authorisation for its own Doncaster to Wakefield line, and these had repeatedly been thrown out; the most recent was in 1861. Now in that year a new company was promoted, to be called the West Riding and Grimsby Railway, and in the 1862 parliamentary session it was authorised, on 7 August 1862, in the West Riding and Grimsby Railway Act 1862 (25 & 26 Vict. c. ccxi). The logic of this apparent reversal of policy was that the line would give West Riding industries access to Grimsby docks, for export of their products. The project was sponsored by the South Yorkshire Railway (SYR) and the Manchester, Sheffield and Lincolnshire Railway, although it was nominally independent. The authorised capital was £360,000, and the sponsoring companies guaranteed a dividend of 4 1/2% on the share capital. The South Yorkshire Railway was leased by the MS&LR from 1864 and was already under its influence. The MS&LR was friendly towards the Great Eastern Railway, which was trying to get access to the Yorkshire coal resources. This was a development that the GNR wished to prevent, and the possibility motivated the GNR to hasten the purchase, to keep the rival away.

== Route ==
The line was to run from a junction with the Bradford, Wakefield and Leeds Railway at Wakefield Westgate, to the South Yorkshire Railway near Stainforth, east of Doncaster on the South Yorkshire Railway line that was yet to be built. In addition there was to be a direct connection from a junction at Adwick to Doncaster. The main line would be 21 miles 40 chains in extent. The junction near Stainforth was Haggs Wood Junction, (shifted to Stainforth later), in a district known as Barnby upon Don. (Note: There are several variants of these names over time.) The Doncaster branch was 4 miles 32 chains in length; its destiny as part of a main line from Doncaster was already evident, for the Board of Trade inspecting officer referred to it as the "so-called Doncaster branch". The Adwick Junction to Haggs Wood Junction section was single line at this stage.

The inspecting officer was Captain Tyler; he was dissatisfied on his inspection of the line in November 1865, but improvements were made in time for his second inspection on 29 December 1865 and he approved the line for passenger operation then. The line opened on 1 February 1866.

== Acquisition ==
West Riding and Grimsby Railway (Transfer) Act 1866
- Act of Parliament
- Parliament of the United Kingdom
- Long title: An Act to transfer the West Riding and Grimsby Railway to the Great Northern and Manchester, Sheffield, and Lincolnshire Railway Companies jointly; and for other Purposes with respect to the said Undertaking and Companies.
- Citation: 29 & 30 Vict. c. clxii

Dates
- Royal assent: 28 June 1866

The Great Northern Railway had opened negotiations to acquire the (unbuilt) WR&GR in 1864, but the approach was unsuccessful. However the WR&GR later agreed to sell its undertaking to the GNR and the Manchester, Sheffield and Lincolnshire Railway jointly. They took possession on 1 February 1866, and the transfer was authorised by West Riding and Grimsby Railway (Transfer) Act 1866 (29 & 30 Vict. c. clxii) of 28 June. The act also gave the GNR running powers to Grimsby from Stainforth, over the MS&LR, South Yorkshire Railway, and the Trent, Ancholme and Grimsby Railway. The MS&LR got running powers to Leeds Central station over the West Yorkshire Railway (as the Bradford, Wakefield and Leeds Railway had become), and the Leeds, Bradford and Halifax Junction Railway.

Having secured the direct route it had sought for so long, the GNR immediately diverted its West Riding trains over the new line, reducing the journey time for express trains by twenty minutes.

== Completing the line ==
The original authorisation had included a curve to the Midland Railway (former North Midland Railway section) Rotherham to Leeds line; it was a short curve from Sandal junction to Walton junction. This had not been submitted for inspection earlier, and Captain Tyler looked at it on 5 June 1866, but he declined to sanction opening of it at first. He later agreed to the use of the curve on 31 July, and it was opened on 1 September 1866. Completion of the section between Adwick junction and Haggs Wood junction had been delayed awaiting the finalisation of the South Yorkshire Railway's new line; in addition it was doubled on GNR insistence. It opened on 1 November 1866.

The stations between Doncaster and Wakefield were Hampole, South Elmsall, Hemsworth, Nostell, and Sandal. Adwick was opened on 1 March 1866, and renamed Adwick-le-Street & Carcroft 13 months later, although the inhabitants had expressed a preference for Carcroft. (It had originally been planned to call it Red House.)

A station had been built at Barnby Dun on the Adwick junction to Stainforth line but apparently it was never used for regular passenger traffic, although it was handling goods by 1867. From the early 1870s it was occasionally used by excursion trains, apparently having been opened solely for that purpose. It was renamed Bramwith by 1889 to avoid confusion with the Barnby Dun station on the South Yorkshire Railway nearby.

== Wakefield station ==
West Riding and Grimsby Railway Act 1864
- Act of Parliament
- Parliament of the United Kingdom
- Long title: An Act to enable the West Riding and Grimsby Railway Company to make a Station at Wakefield, and for other Purposes with relation to that Company.
- Citation: 27 & 28 Vict. c. xci

Dates
- Royal assent: 23 June 1864

Text of statute as originally enacted

West Riding and Grimsby Railway Act 1867
- Act of Parliament
- Parliament of the United Kingdom
- Long title: An Act to make further Provision with respect to the Station at Wakefield.
- Citation: 30 & 31 Vict. c. xlix

Dates
- Royal assent: 31 May 1867

Text of statute as originally enacted

The Wakefield Westgate station had been opened by the Bradford, Wakefield and Leeds Railway (BW&LR), with limited facilities as a wayside station. It was plain that it needed to be improved, (Note: Dow says "to avoid payment of tolls to the WYR".) and the WR&GR obtained the West Riding and Grimsby Railway Act 1864 (27 & 28 Vict. c. xci) on 23 June 1864 authorising a new station at Westgate. It was to be located on the West Yorkshire Railway (WYR) (as the BW&LR had become), for the joint use of the Midland Railway, WYR, MS&LR, and SYR, all of which subscribed to its cost. (Note: The WR&GR secured the act of Parliament although the proposed station was not on its line.) The new station was in use on 1 May 1867. A new goods station, joint with the Midland Railway and the MS&LR was opened alongside on 1 July 1868.

== Crofton branch ==
The GNR and the MS&LR jointly opened the Crofton Branch, a line connecting the main line at Hare Park Junction south of Wakefield to the L&YR at Crofton Junction, on the Goole to Wakefield line. It was 1 mile 29 chains in length, and cost £20,000 to construct, having been authorised by the Great Northern Railway Act 1883 of 2 August 1883. It opened for goods traffic on 8 November 1886. From 1 July 1887 some GNR passenger trains were diverted over the line to make a station call at Wakefield Kirkgate, to transfer traffic with the L&YR. The L&YR used the Crofton branch to reach Fitzwilliam Colliery. The Crofton branch closed to passenger traffic on 1 May 1977.

== New connections ==
Several new junctions with other lines were constructed in the nineteenth century. The first was a spur from Joan Croft junction on the North Eastern Railway (East Coast Main Line) to Applehurst junction, 11 miles west of Bramwith. It was intended to give the NER access to the Frodingham district, and was brought into use in 1877.

In 1879 when the Swinton and Knottingley Joint Railway (S&KJR) was opened, double connections were laid in with the WR&GR. These ran from the east side of the S&KJR into South Elmsall station, and from the west side of the S&KJR, at Moorthorpe station, to the south side of the WR&GR at Moorthorpe junction; the latter connection was used by the Sheffield-Leeds service of the MS&LR.

In October 1880 the converging junction from the Adwick line at Haggs Wood junction was shifted to a new connection at Stainforth station, and Haggs Wood signalbox was abolished.

Next followed the North and South junctions at Nostell, which were formed by the MS&LR in 1882 when it extended its old Barnsley Coal line through Notton and Ryhill to the WR&GR.

The Hull, Barnsley and West Riding Junction Railway (later Hull and Barnsley Railway) formed a junction with the WR&GR at Hemsworth on 20 August 1885, making an east-to-north connection. Apart from specials, the line was only used by goods traffic.

== Great Central Railway ==
The Manchester, Sheffield and Lincolnshire Railway changed its name to the Great Central Railway on 1 August 1897.

== Twentieth century ==
Three additions were made to the West Riding and Grimsby line during the period 1900–1922. The first to be completed was the 11-mile Brodsworth colliery branch from Castle Hills junction 2 miles north-west of Doncaster. It was authorized by the Great Central Railway Act 1907 (7 Edw. 7. c. lxxviii) of 26 July 1907 and opened for coal traffic on 18 May 1908. The same act permitted the construction of an east curve at Adwick junction. This left the Doncaster line 16 chains north-west of Carcroft & Adwick-le-Street station and ran for half-a-mile to Skellow junction on the Stainforth line. It was opened for goods traffic on 18 January 1909. Although installed mainly for goods traffic, there were some summer excursions, and for a time there was a Saturdays only train for Cleethorpes.

Finally there was a 1-mile branch to Moorhouse & South Elmsall on the Wath branch of the Hull and Barnsley Railway; with the aid of running powers it afforded access to Frickley colliery. Sanctioned by the Great Northern Railway Act 1906 (6 Edw. 7. c. cxliv) of 4 August 1906, it left the WR&GR west of Hampole station and was brought into use on 8 March 1909. With the completion of these short links the route mileage of the WR&GR totalled 31 1/2 miles.

== Grouping ==
At the beginning of 1923 most of the main line railways of Great Britain were "grouped" under the Railways Act 1921 into one or other of four new, large, concerns. The West Riding and Grimsby Railway was jointly owned by the Great Northern Railway and the Great Central Railway, and both of these companies were constituents of the new London and North Eastern Railway (LNER). Accordingly, the WR&GR became part of the LNER too, and its joint status ceased. The WR&GR received £165,442 in compensation.

== Closures ==
The Crofton branch closed to passenger traffic on 1 May 1977.

The line between Adwick Junction and Stainforth Junction closed to passengers on 14 May 1979, and to goods on 15 September 1980.

== Historical maps ==
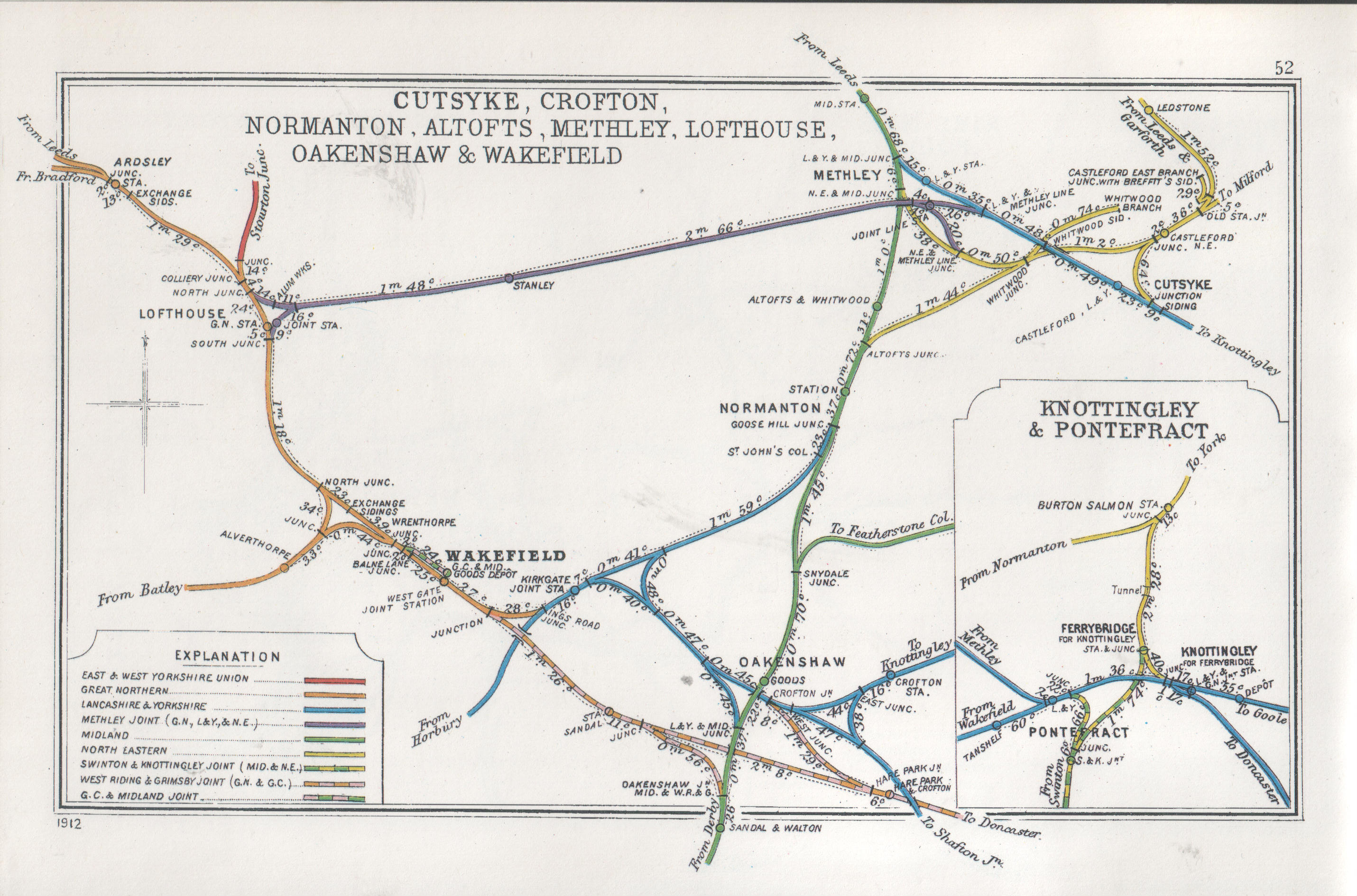
The western end in 1912

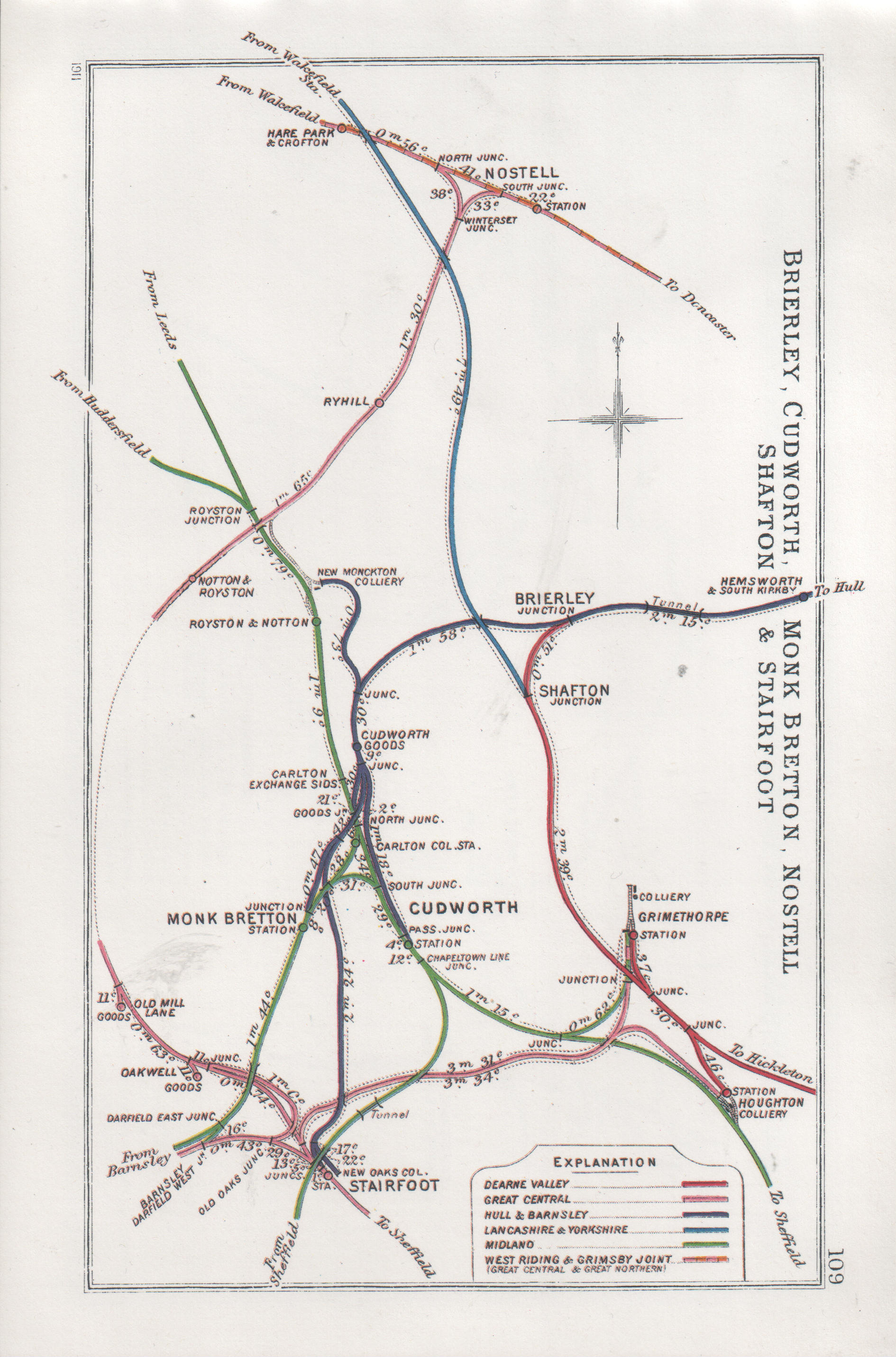
The western part of the central section in 1911

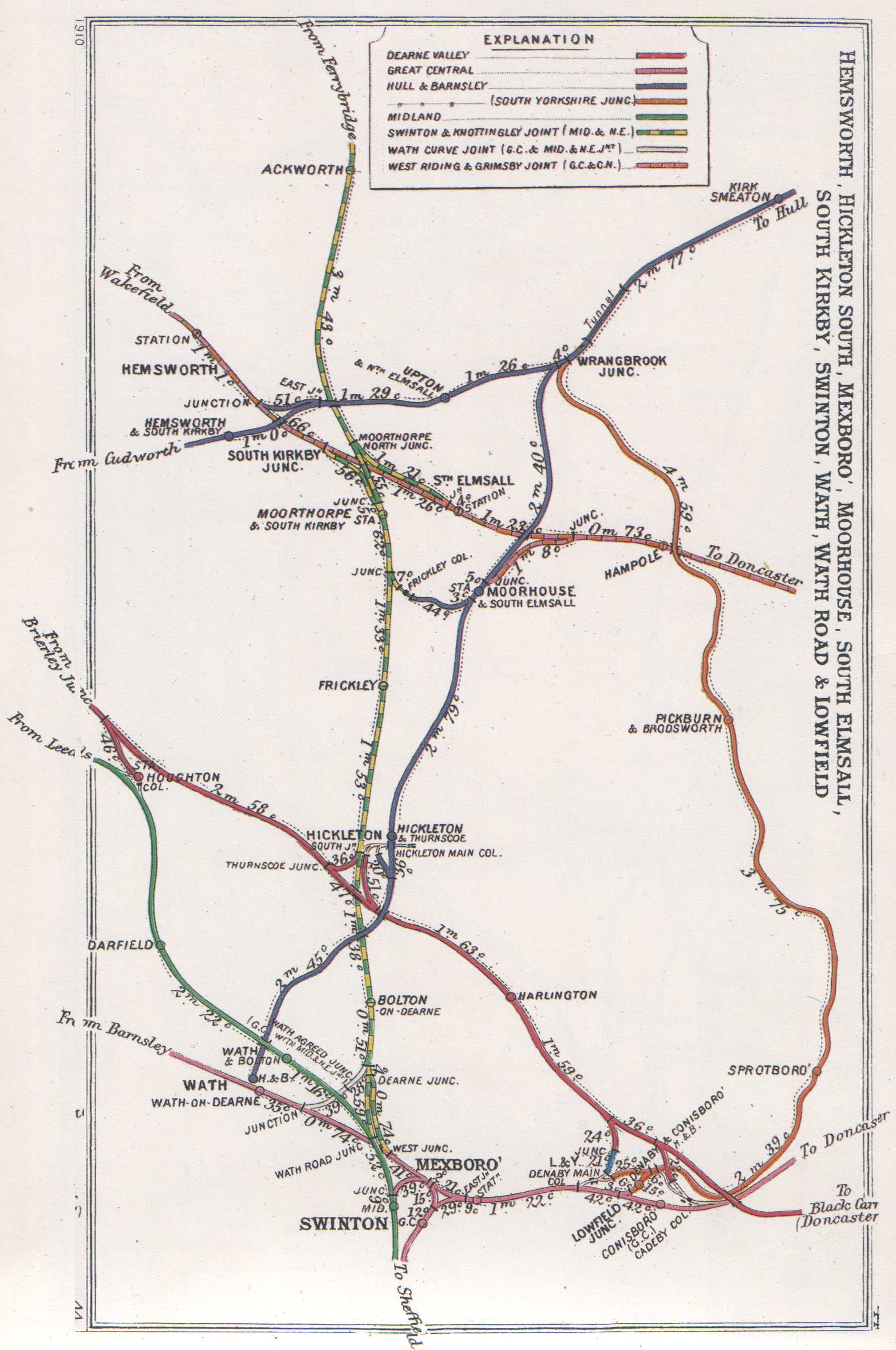
The eastern part of the central section in 1910

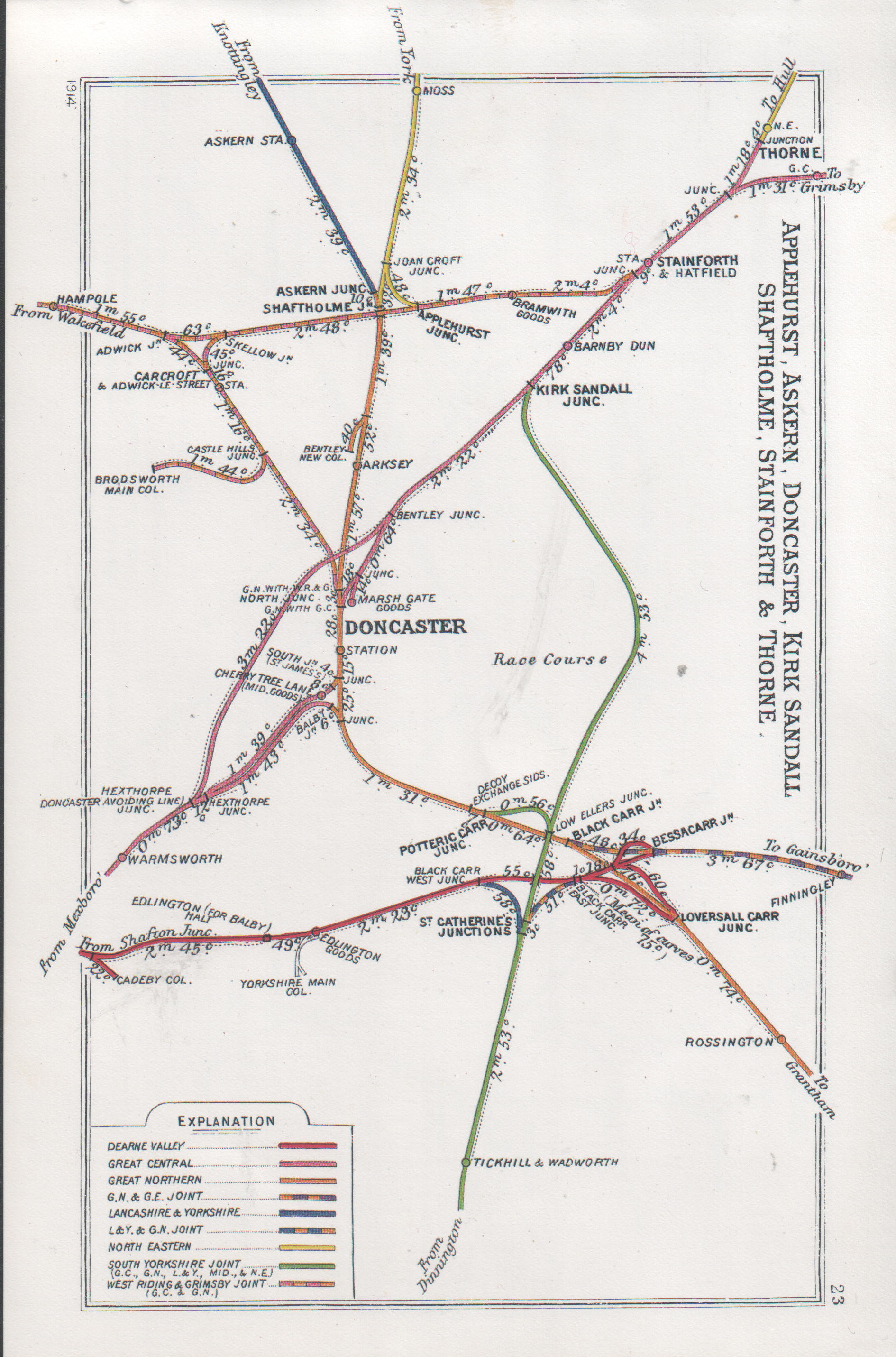
The eastern section in 1914

Railway Clearing House diagrams showing the WR&G line (orange/pink) from Wakefield to Doncaster, and the branch to Stainforth.

== Modern times ==
New stations at Adwick, Bentley, Sandal and Agbrigg (30 November 1987) and Fitzwilliam (1 March 1982) have been opened in response to housing development.

The main line was electrified in 1988 and now forms part of the main line between Doncaster and Leeds.

== Station list ==
- West Riding Junction, Wakefield;
- Sandal; opened 1 February 1866; closed 4 November 1957; reopened as Sandal & Agbrigg 30 November 1987; still open;
- Hare Park & Crofton; opened November 1886; closed 4 February 1952;
- Nostell; opened 1 February 1866; closed 29 October 1951;
- Fitzwilliam; opened 1 June 1937; closed 6 November 1967; reopened 1 March 1982; still open;
- Hemsworth; opened 1 February 1866; closed 6 November 1967;
- South Elmsall; opened 1 February 1866; still open;
- Hampole; opened 1 January 1885; closed 7 January 1952;
- Adwick Junction;
- Adwick; opened 1 March 1866; renamed Adwick & Carcroft 1867; renamed Carcroft and Adwick-le-Street 1880; closed 6 November 1967;
- Adwick opened 11 October 1993; still open;
- Bentley; opened 27 April 1992; still open;
- Marshgate Junction, Doncaster.
- Adwick Junction; above;
- Applehurst Junction; convergence of North Eastern Railway line from Joan Croft Junction;
- Barnby Dun; opened about 1872; no regular passenger service; renamed Bramwith 1 February 1882; closed about 1933;
- Stainforth Junction; convergence with Doncaster to Grimsby line.
