= Pontefract station =

Pontefract station may refer to one of the following stations in Pontefract, West Yorkshire, England:

- Pontefract Baghill railway station, the least busy of the three, served by trains between Sheffield and York
- Pontefract Monkhill railway station, the busiest station, served by trains between Goole and Leeds/Wakefield
- Pontefract Tanshelf railway station, the most centrally located, served by trains between Goole and Wakefield
- Pontefract bus station, served by local buses and National Express coach routes

== See also ==
- Pontefract line, the railway line serving Monkhill and Tanshelf stations
