= Crofton railway station =

Former railway station in Crofton, Yorkshire, England

Crofton
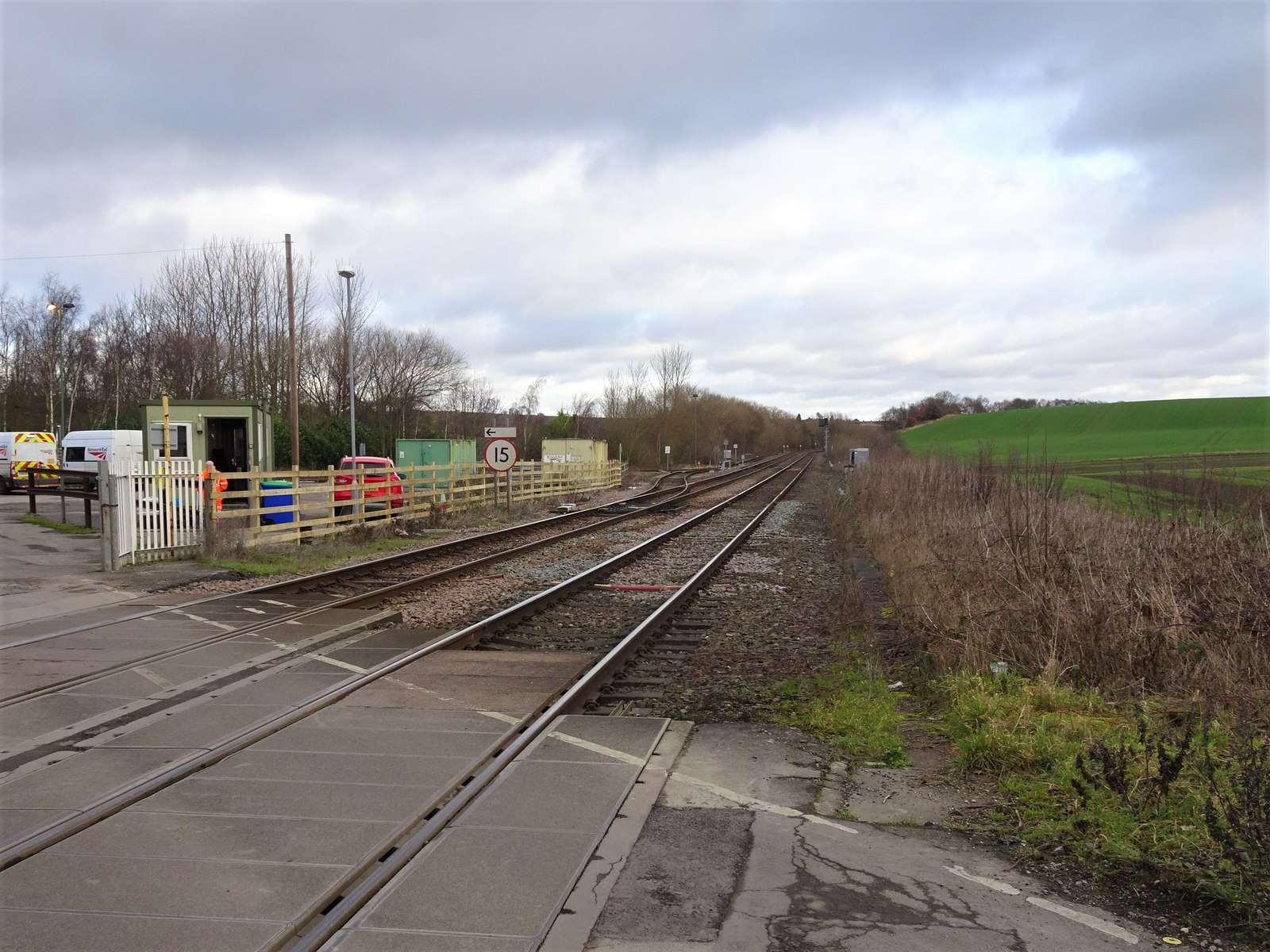
- Site of the former station in January 2020

General information
- Location: Crofton, City of Wakefield; England
- Coordinates: 53°40′00″N 1°26′28″W
- Grid reference: SE369190

Other information
- Status: Disused

History
- Original company: Lancashire and Yorkshire Railway
- Pre-grouping: London and North Western Railway
- Post-grouping: London, Midland and Scottish Railway

Key dates
- 1 November 1853: Station opened
- 30 November 1931: Station closed
Location

Crofton Station was the smaller of two stations serving Crofton (with the other being Hare Park & Crofton). It was next to Doncaster Road, on the current Pontefract Line, behind the Crofton Arms Public House.

The station was demolished in the 1960s, yet the remains of the old station house in its current derelict form can be seen from the A638, or on passing trains from Wakefield Kirkgate, towards Pontefract Tanshelf.

In 2001, Bombardier Transportation opened Crofton TMD, a traction maintenance depot, on the former station site.

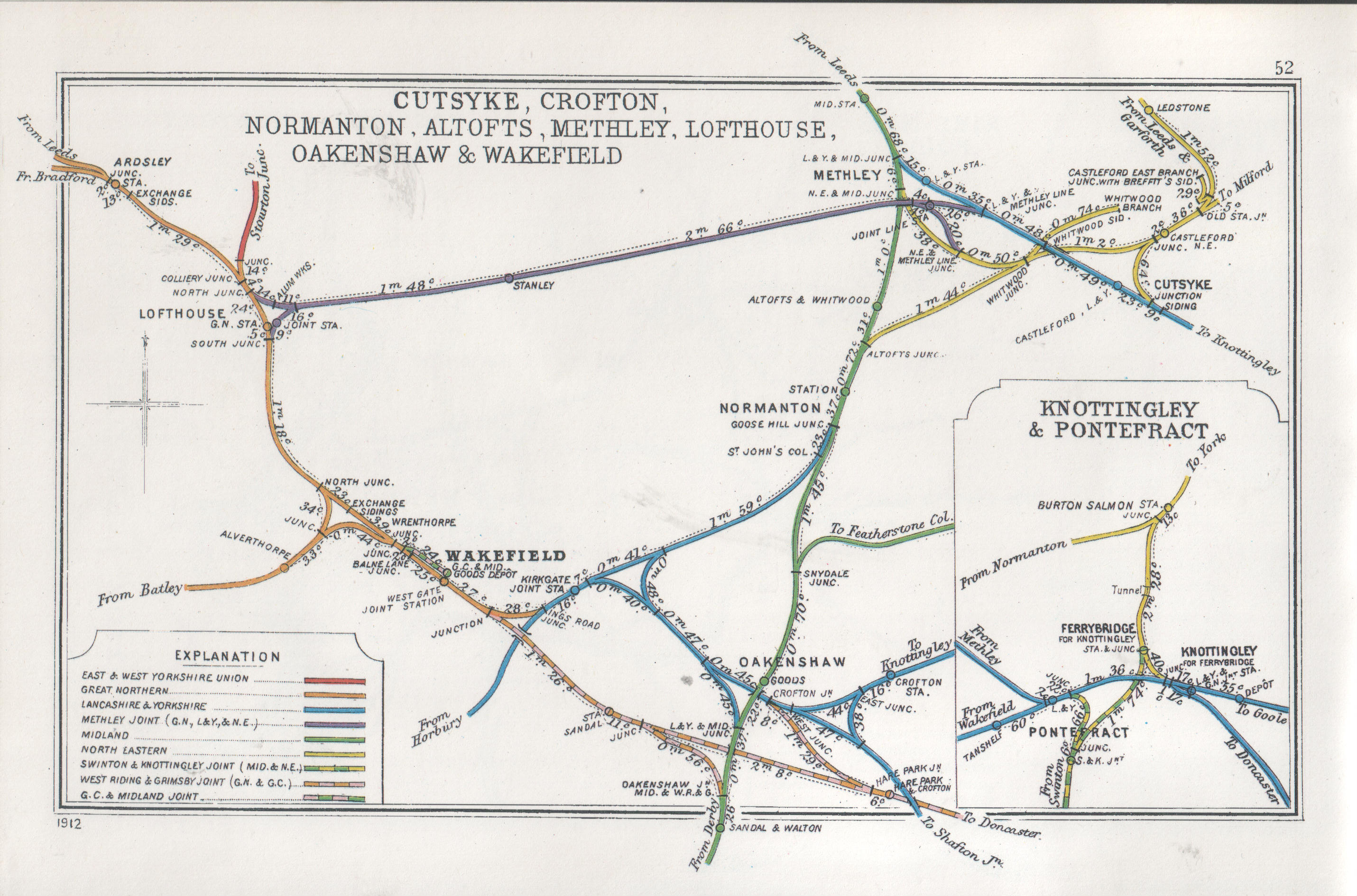
Railway Clearing House - Railway Junction Diagram showing Pre Grouping railway junctions and stations around Crofton

Preceding station	Historical railways	Following station
Wakefield Kirkgate	Lancashire and Yorkshire Railway	Sharlston
