= Sharlston railway station =

Railway station in West Yorkshire, England

Sharlston
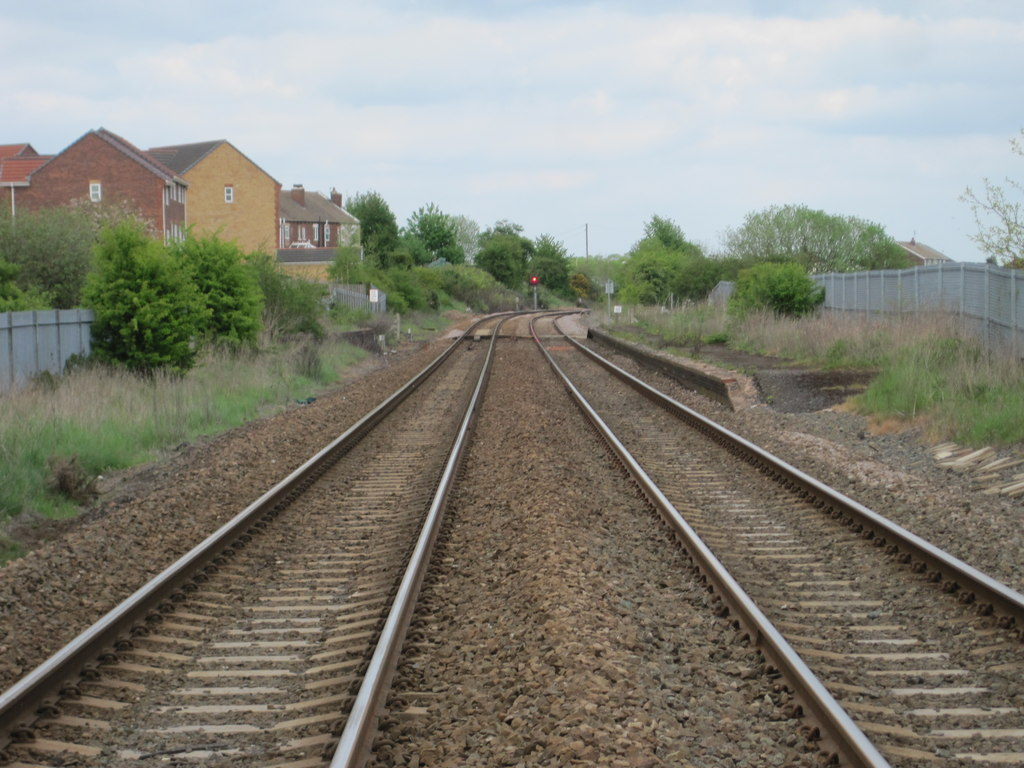
- Sharlston railway station site

General information
- Location: Sharlston; West Yorkshire; England
- Coordinates: 53.6752°N 1.4065°W
- Ordnance Survey: SE392199
- Line: Wakefield to Goole Line
- Platforms: 2
- Tracks: 2

Other information
- Status: Closed

History
- Opening: 1869
- Closed: 3 March 1958
- Original company: Lancashire & Yorkshire Railway
- Post-grouping: London, Midland and Scottish Railway
Location

Sharlston railway station is a closed railway station on the Pontefract Line in West Yorkshire, England. The station was opened in 1869 by the Lancashire & Yorkshire Railway to service a new mining community at Sharlston. The station was closed in 1958, but in 1992, a new station was opened at Streethouse, about 600 yards (550 m) east of the Sharlston station site.

== History ==
Sharlston railway station was located on the Lancashire and Yorkshire Railway's (L&YR) Wakefield to Goole Line. The line had opened in 1848, although proposed by the Wakefield, Pontefract & Goole Railway, by its opening, the company had been merged into the L&YR. The station was opened to traffic in 1869, and was located 4 miles (6.4 km) east of Wakefield Kirkgate, and 4 miles (6.4 km) west of Pontefract Tanshelf. Although other stations opened with the line, Sharlston was opened later in conjunction with the sinking of the New Sharlston Colliery and the new mining village built there.

The Railway Clearing House listing from 1904 shows that the station could only handle passengers (it did not have any goods facilities of its own); but that there were railway connections to Sharlston Colliery, New Sharlston Colliery and Sharlston siding.

The station closed on 3 March 1958; at the time it was located in the North Eastern Region of British Railways.

Passenger services over the line ceased in 1967, but in May 1992, services were re-instated and a station was opened at Streethouse 600 yards (550 m) east of the old Sharlston station site.

Preceding station	Historical railways	Following station
Featherstone	Lancashire and Yorkshire Railway	Crofton
