= Pontefract bus station =

Bus station in West Yorkshire, England

Pontefract
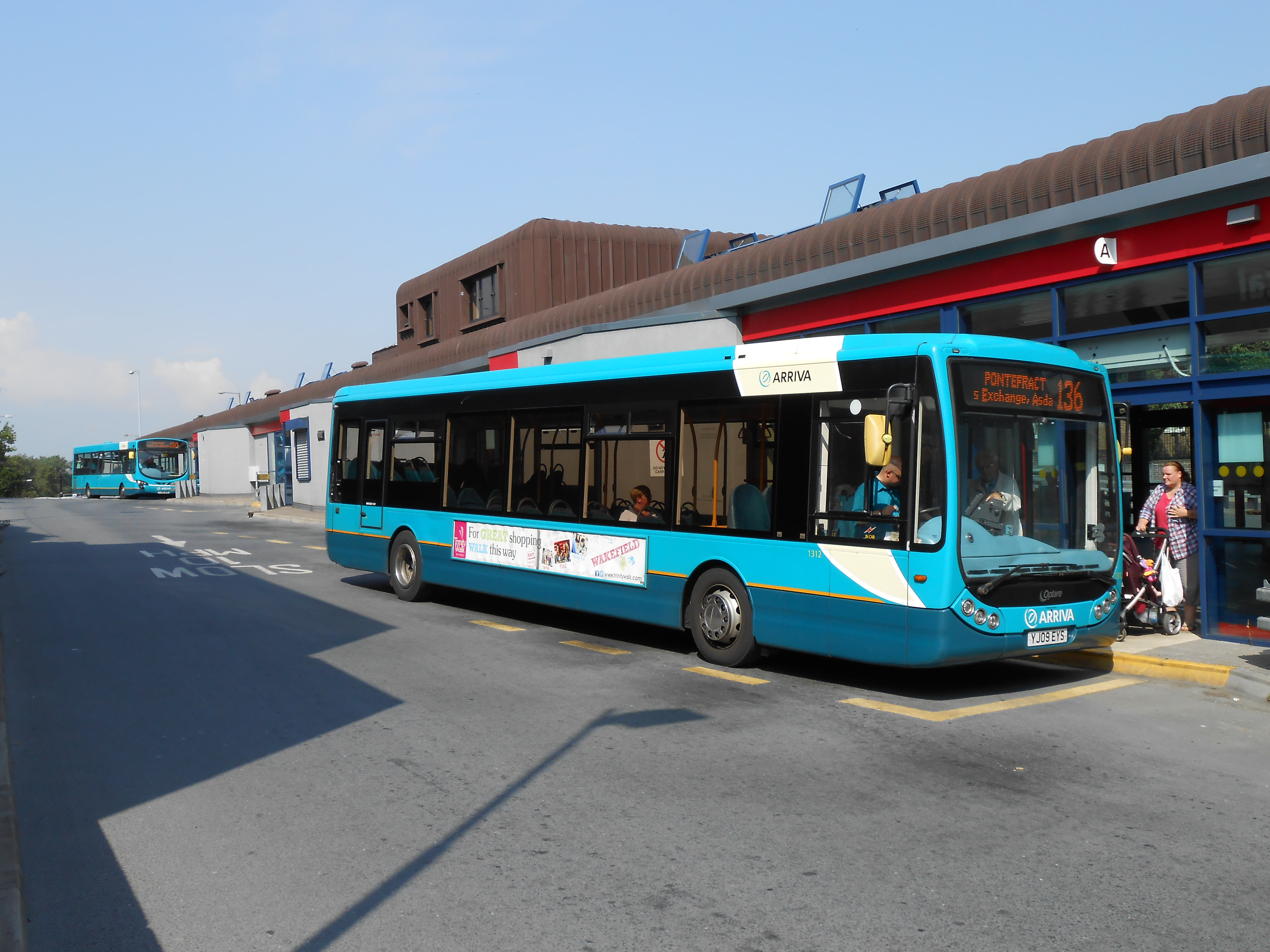

General information
- Location: Horsefair, Pontefract, City of Wakefield. England
- Coordinates: 53.693°N 1.309°W
- Operator: West Yorkshire Metro
- Bus stands: 9
- Bus operators: Arriva Yorkshire, Stagecoach Yorkshire, Globe Holidays, Ross Travel, TJ's Travel
- Connections: Monkhill station (980 yards [900 m]), Tanshelf station (770 yards [700 m]), Baghill station (440 yards [400 m])
Location

Pontefract bus station serves the town of Pontefract, in West Yorkshire, England. It is owned and managed by West Yorkshire Metro.

== Description ==
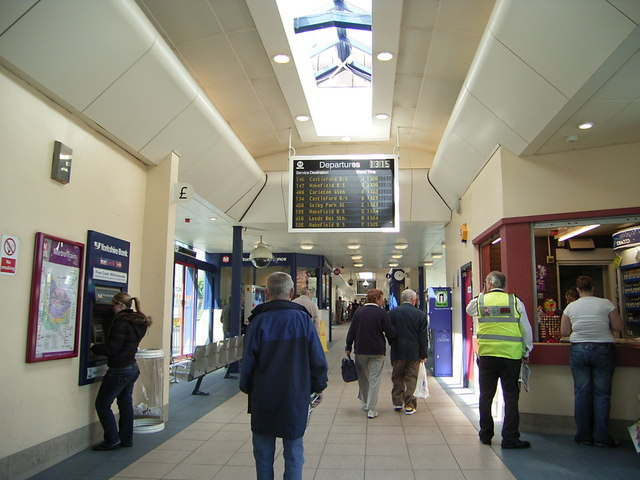
A view inside the bus station

The bus station is situated in Pontefract town centre and can be accessed from Horsefair and Northgate.

There are nine stands, labelled A-H and J.

Facilities include a coffee shop and a newsagent.

== Services ==
The main operators that serve the bus station are:

- Arriva Yorkshire
- Stagecoach Yorkshire
- Globe Holidays
- Ross Travel
- TJ's Travel.

Routes connect the town with Barnsley, Knottingley, Leeds, Selby and Wakefield.
