= Xscape (building) =

Brand of leisure centre

Xscape is a brand name for buildings developed by X-Leisure, now part of Landsec in England. Typically they contain a real snow indoor ski slope, leisure facilities and related shops. As of February 2026, there are two sites, Milton Keynes and Castleford. A previous site in Renfrew was sold in 2022.

== Xscape Milton Keynes ==
Xscape Milton Keynes
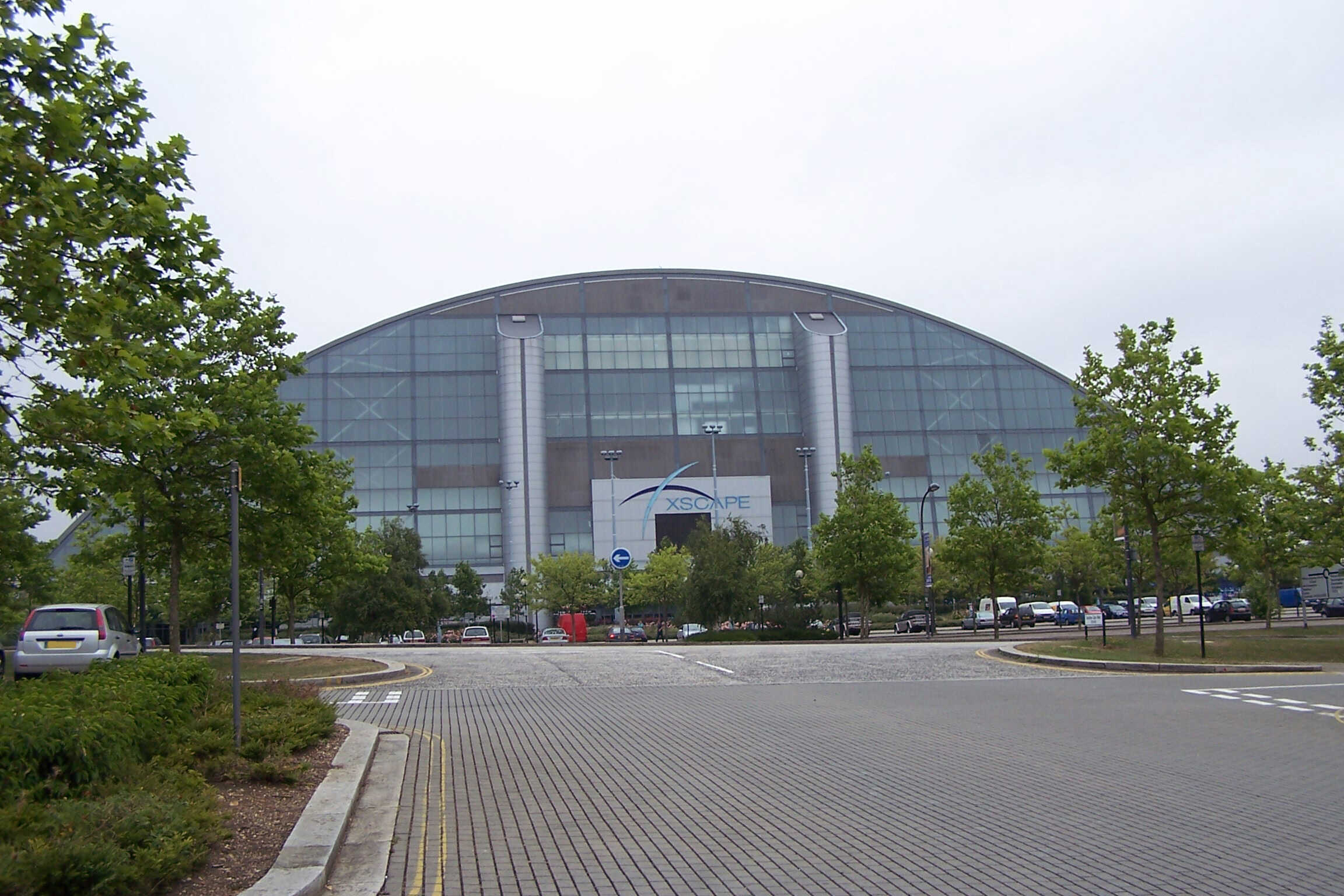
- Xscape Milton Keynes as seen from across Secklow Gate
- Interactive map of the Xscape Milton Keynes area

General information
- Status: Completed
- Location: 602 Marlborough Gate, Milton Keynes MK9 3XA, England
- Coordinates: 52°02′29″N 0°44′57″W
- Elevation: 105 metres (344 ft)
- Opened: 2000
- Client: X-Leisure

Height
- Roof: 44 metres (144 ft) (max)

Design and construction
- Architecture firm: FaulknerBrowns

Website
- www.xscapemiltonkeynes.co.uk/en

Xscape Milton Keynes opened in July 2000 and is a major feature on the skyline of Central Milton Keynes as seen from the east. The front of the Xscape building is 44 metres (144 feet) high, making it the second tallest building in the city after Hotel La Tour on Marlborough Gate. Xscape Milton Keynes features a 170 m (560 ft) long real-snow ski slope, a 16-screen cinema, a number of shops and restaurants, a casino and a trampoline park. The two large funnels on the front of the building are sometimes mistaken for lifts or part of the cooling system; in fact they are stairs.

Located directly behind the Xscape building is the iFLY indoor skydiving centre.

== Xscape Yorkshire ==
Xscape Yorkshire
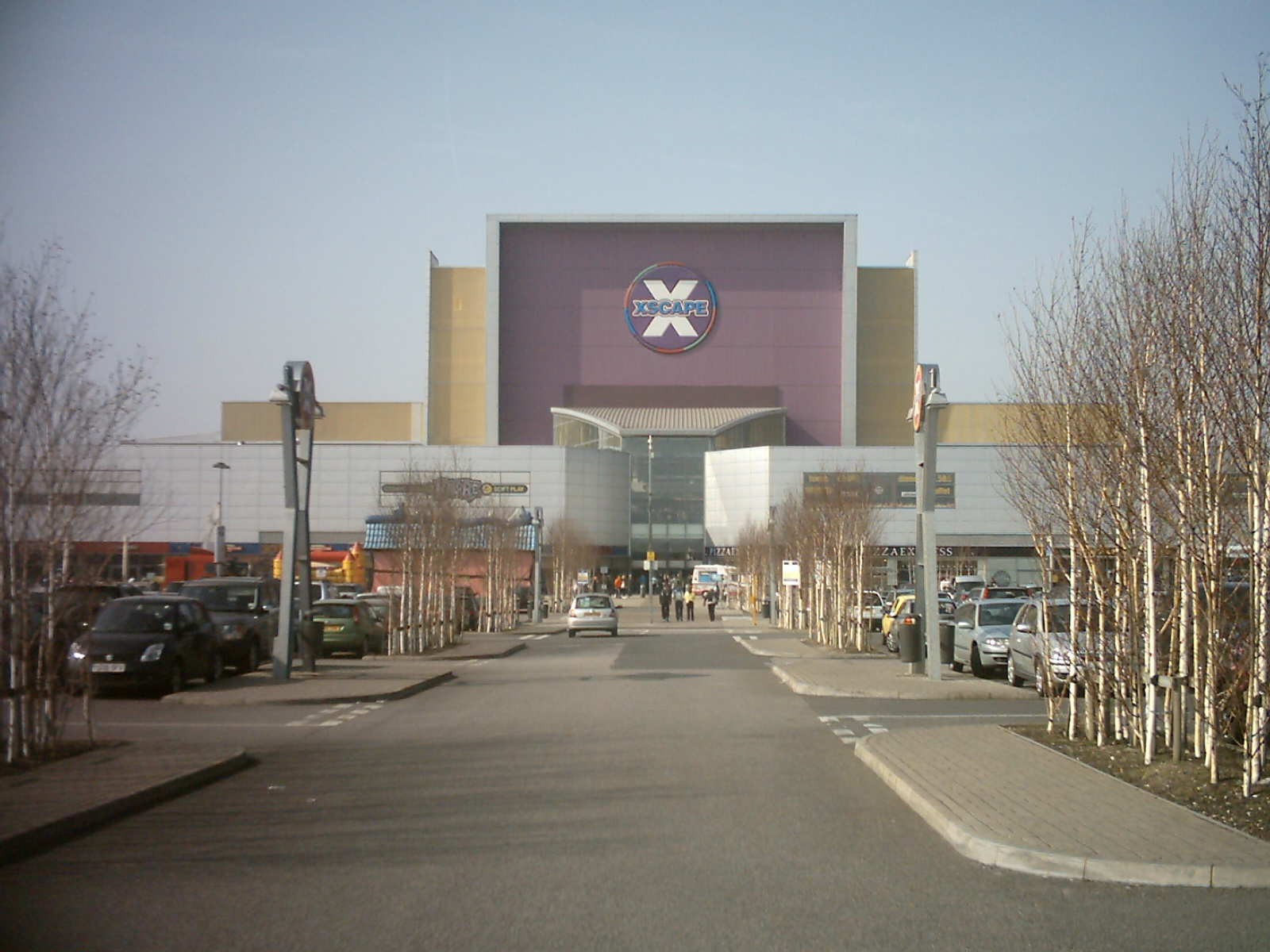
- Xscape Yorkshire as seen from the car park
- Interactive map of the Xscape Yorkshire area

General information
- Status: Completed
- Location: Colorado Way, Glasshoughton, Castleford, West Yorkshire, WF10 4TA, England
- Coordinates: 53°42′37″N 1°20′31″W
- Elevation: 26 metres (85 ft)
- Opened: 2003
- Client: X-Leisure

Height
- Roof: 38 metres (125 ft) (max)

Design and construction
- Architecture firm: FaulknerBrowns

Website
- www.xscapeyorkshire.co.uk/en

Xscape Yorkshire is in Glasshoughton and opened in October 2003 with a footprint of approx 5,500 square metres (59,200 sq ft).

Xscape Yorkshire was a major development for what was before, an average sized town in West Yorkshire and is situated next to Junction 32, a popular outlet mall formerly known as Freeport.

The development contains a number of shops, restaurants, a church, and entertainment facilities including a bowling alley, multi screen cinema, laser tag, crazy golf and amusements. The Cineworld closed on 19 January 2025, with a Vue International cinema replacing it. It utilises complex ventilation technology. The site is served by Glasshoughton railway station on the Pontefract line (Leeds–Hull), opened by West Yorkshire Metro on 21 February 2005.

== Xscape Braehead Renfrew ==
There was formerly an Xscape in Renfrew. In 2020, the venue was sold by its owners (Intu) when that company failed. The ski slope was closed in 2022.
