= Glasshoughton railway station =

Railway station in West Yorkshire, England

Glasshoughton
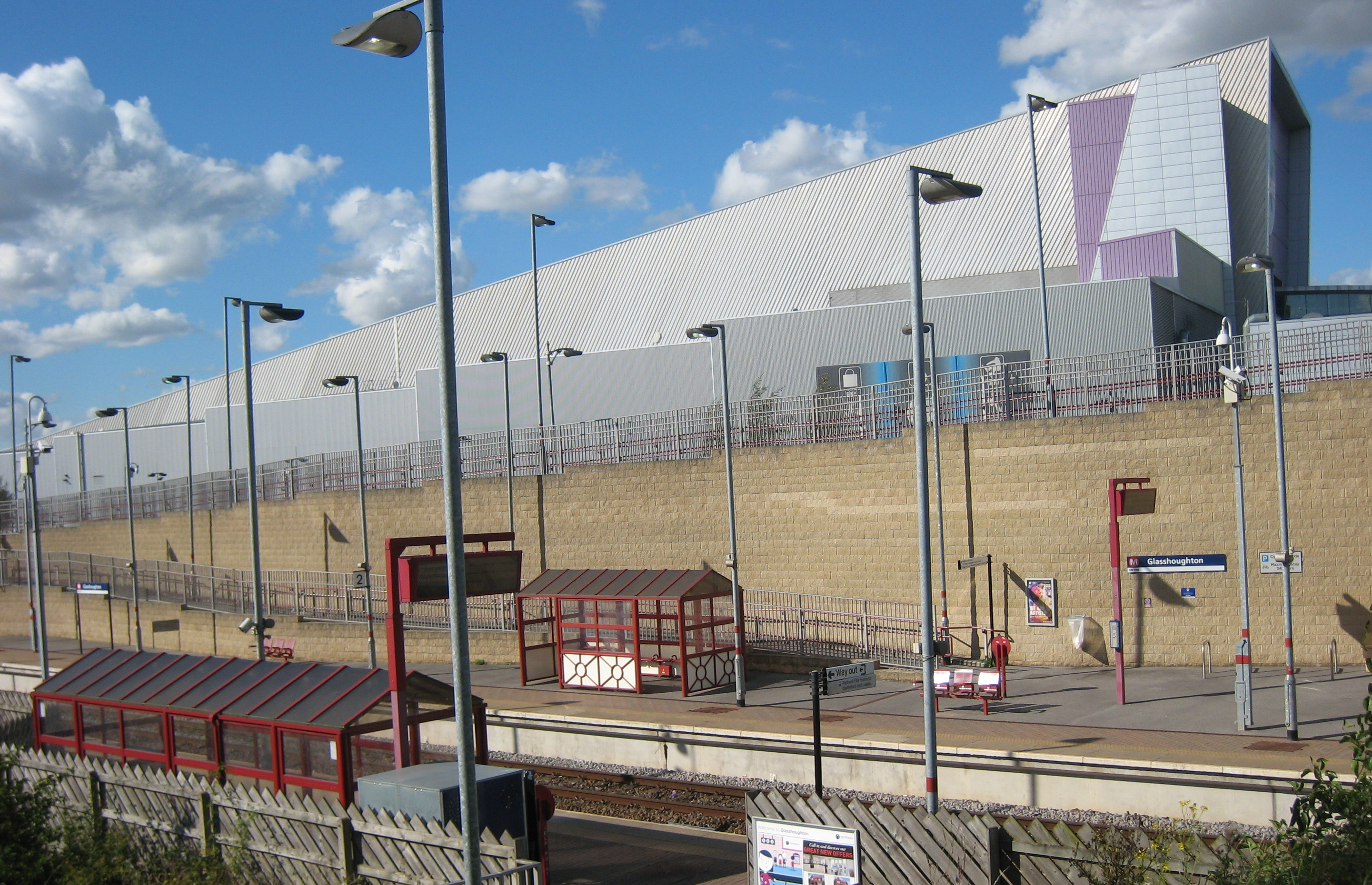
- Glasshoughton Station in August 2017 with Xscape behind

General information
- Location: Glasshoughton, City of Wakefield; England
- Coordinates: 53.70861°N 1.34056°W
- Grid reference: SE436237
- Manager: Northern
- Transit authority: West Yorkshire Metro
- Platforms: 2

Other information
- Station code: GLH
- Fare zone: 3
- Classification: DfT category F1

History
- Opened: 21 February 2005; 21 years ago

Passengers
- 2020/21: ▼26,134
- 2021/22: ▲99,294
- 2022/23: ▲0.113 million
- 2023/24: ▲0.115 million
- 2024/25: ▼0.109 million
Location
Notes
- Passenger statistics from the Office of Rail and Road

Glasshoughton railway station serves Glasshoughton, Castleford in West Yorkshire, England. It lies on the Pontefract Line, operated by Northern, 12 miles (19 km) south-east of Leeds.

It was opened by West Yorkshire Metro on 21 February 2005. It is located near to the Xscape indoor ski slope and leisure complex near Castleford, all of which occupy the former site of Glasshoughton Colliery which ceased winding coal in 1986.

Demand for the new station was seriously under-estimated by Metro. For example, passenger journeys in 2008/09 were forecast to be 50,989 but were actually 135,279. This was chiefly because usage was modelled on the basis of demand for travel by current local residents and businesses only. No attempt was made to estimate possible travel to the station for local retail and leisure attractions, nor possible travel by people driving to the 100-space car park on a park and ride basis, e.g. from the nearby M62. Demand from future residential developments at Glasshoughton was also ignored.

== Facilities ==
The station is unstaffed but has two ticket machines, one on each platform; passengers must buy their tickets in advance, on the train, or at their destination (if available). It has waiting shelters, customer help points, timetable poster boards, digital CIS displays on each platform, and an automatic announcement system to offer train running information. Step-free access is available to both platforms via ramps from the footbridge, which connects to the car park and station entrance.

== Services ==
There is an hourly service to Leeds and Knottingley Monday through Saturday (plus one single afternoon service through to Goole), and a service every two hours in each direction on Sunday.

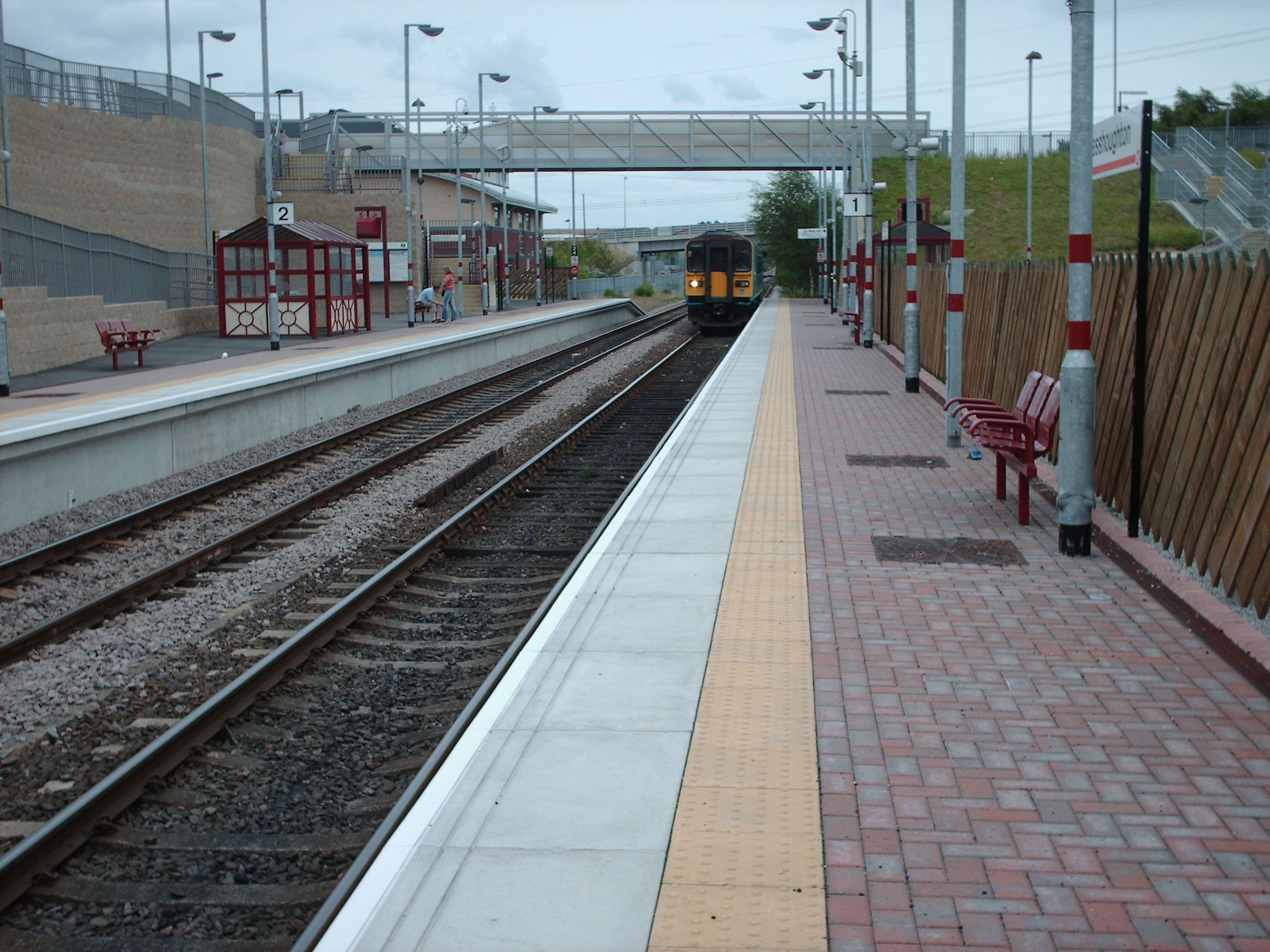
Platform 1, photo taken in July 2006

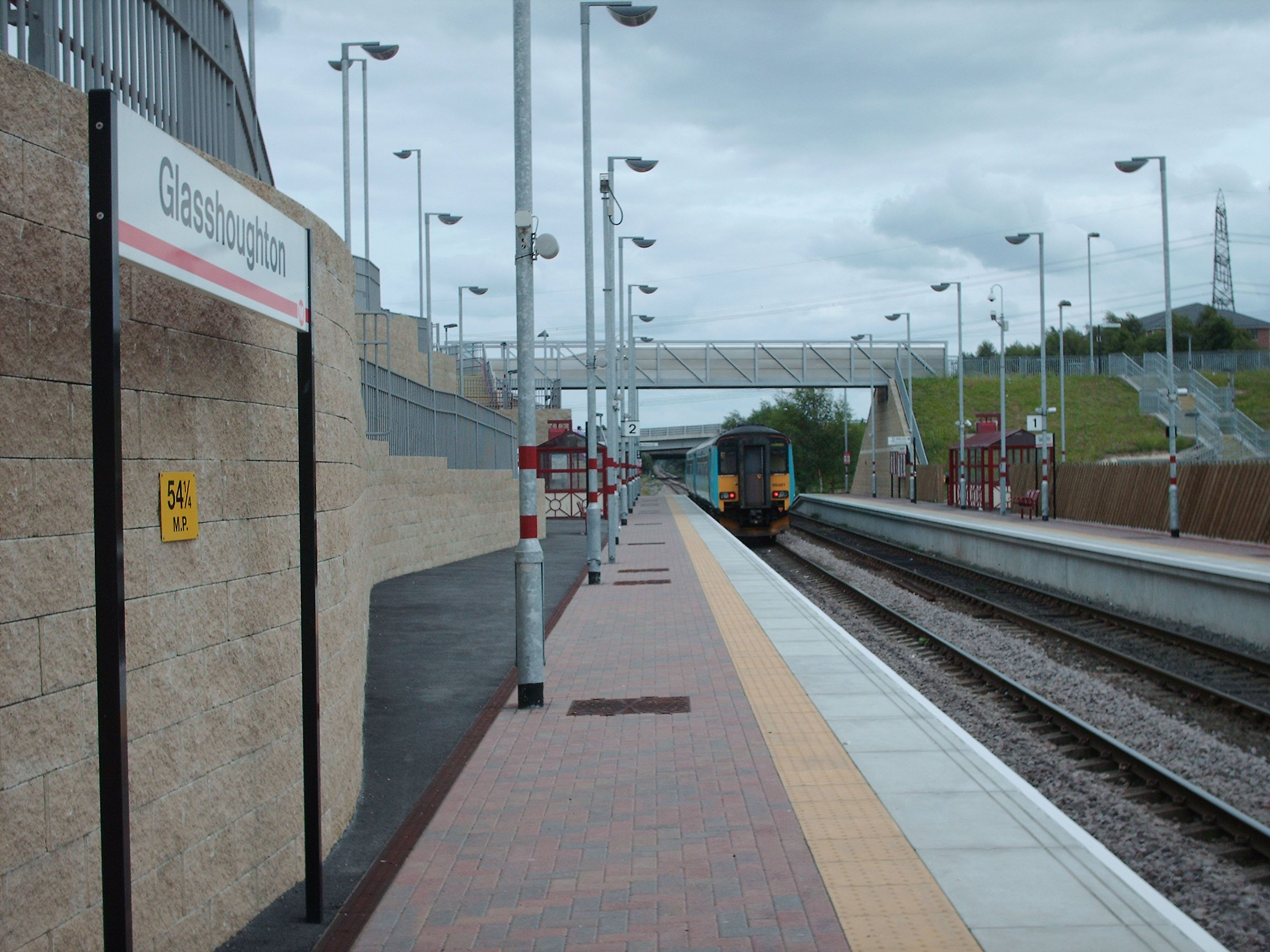
Platform 2, photo taken in July 2006

Preceding station	National Rail	Following station
Pontefract Monkhill	Northern Pontefract Line	Castleford
