= Streethouse railway station =

Railway station in West Yorkshire, England

Streethouse
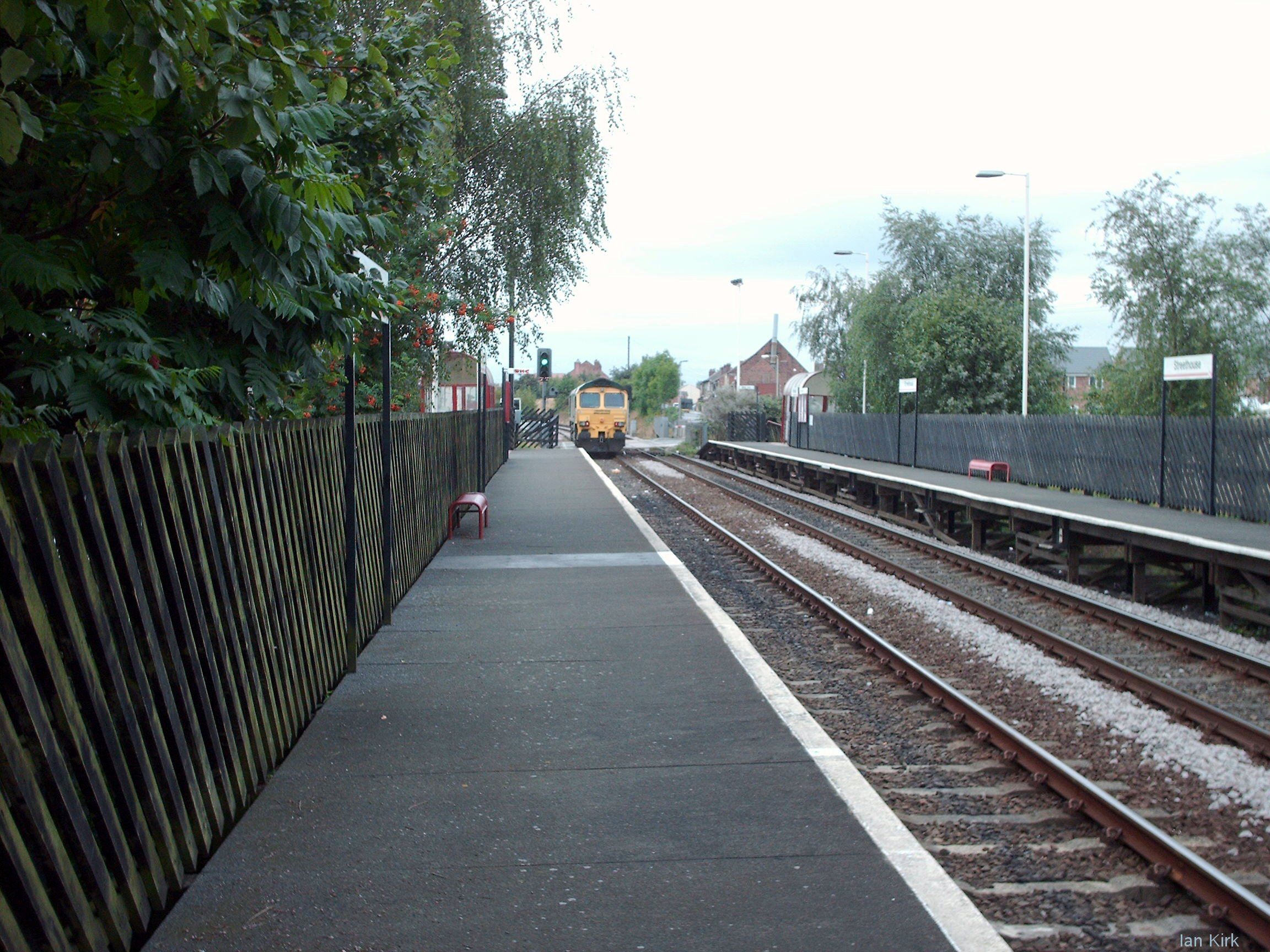
- Freightliner class 66/5 locomotive no. 66509 passes through platform 1 in August 2006

General information
- Location: Streethouse, City of Wakefield; England
- Coordinates: 53.6762°N 1.4000°W
- Grid reference: SE397201
- Manager: Northern Trains
- Transit authority: West Yorkshire Metro
- Platforms: 2

Other information
- Station code: SHC
- Fare zone: 3
- Classification: DfT category F2

History
- Opened: 12 May 1992

Passengers
- 2021/22: ▲18,282
- 2022/23: ▲18,970
- 2023/24: ▲22,690
- 2024/25: ▲25,606
- 2025/26: ▲26,208
Location
Notes
- Passenger statistics from the Office of Rail and Road

Streethouse railway station serves the village of Streethouse in West Yorkshire, England. It lies on the Pontefract Line, operated by Northern Trains and is 4 miles (6 km) east of Wakefield Kirkgate station.

The station was opened by West Yorkshire Metro and Regional Railways on 12 May 1992 when the line between Wakefield and Pontefract was re-opened to passenger traffic.

== History ==
The original L&YR station opened here in 1848 on the Lancashire and Yorkshire Railway's line from Wakefield to Pontefract slightly up the line by the next curve in the direction of Wakefield Kirkgate. It takes approximately 2 minutes to travel from the modern Streethouse station to the former Sharlston-Streethouse\Sharlston station, which closed to regular passengers in 1958 and then completely in 1967. It was adjacent to a branch line and former junction to the now-closed local Sharlston coal mine.

== Services ==
On Monday to Saturday, there is an hourly service each way, to Leeds via both Wakefield stations and to Knottingley. From December 2017, Sunday trains were introduced. On Sunday, trains run two-hourly between Knottingley and Leeds via Wakefield.

Preceding station	National Rail	Following station
Wakefield Kirkgate	Northern Trains Pontefract Line	Featherstone
Historical railways
Wakefield Kirkgate	Lancashire and Yorkshire Railway	Sharlston
