= Streethouse =

Village in West Yorkshire, England

Coordinates: 53.676°N 1.403°W

- Location within West Yorkshire
- Metropolitan borough: City of Wakefield
- Metropolitan county: West Yorkshire
- Region: Yorkshire and the Humber
- Country: England
- Sovereign state: United Kingdom
- Post town: PONTEFRACT
- Postcode district: WF7
- Dialling code: 01977
- Police: West Yorkshire
- Fire: West Yorkshire
- Ambulance: Yorkshire
- UK Parliament: Hemsworth

Streethouse is a semi-rural village in West Yorkshire, England, situated to the east of Wakefield, the west of Featherstone and the south-west of Castleford. It is also situated on a Roman road. Streethouse is currently a commuter village serving Wakefield, Normanton, Featherstone, Pontefract and Leeds.

== History ==
A Roman road ran through Streethouse. More recently it was a mining village. Like many industrial areas, Streethouse suffered a period of decline. In recent years however, the village has enjoyed a considerable amount of investment from regeneration funds and private investment from housing companies. Some of the older, run down buildings are now earmarked for demolition but because of the developer going into administration no further work on the site has taken place.

== Access ==
Streethouse railway station provides regular services to Pontefract and Wakefield with interconnecting services to Leeds and Sheffield. Junction 31 of the M62 is close by and the Glasshoughton Link Road has improved access to Wakefield and Castleford and relieved congestion on the M62.

== Facilities ==
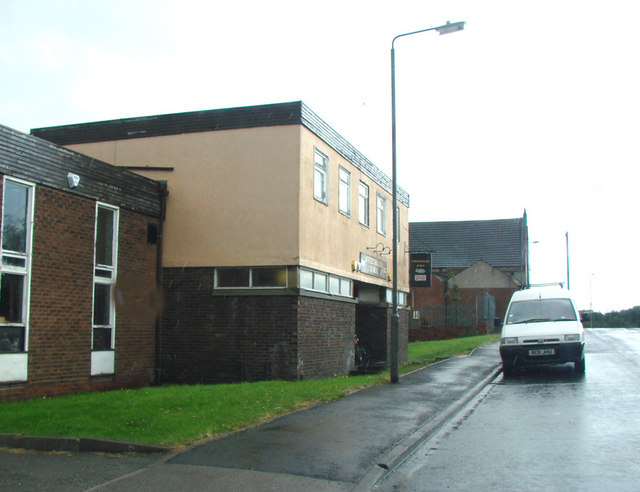
Streethouse Working Men's Club, one typical of mining villages in this area.

The village has a school, although children have to travel to nearby Featherstone, Crofton or Normanton for their secondary education. The area has a church, post office, one shop, Streethouse Cricket Club, which formed in 1962, and a cafe. The former WMC is now demolished and new houses have been built on the site. There is also a park with a new children's playground and a separate playing field. Sharlston Country Park borders the village following the completion of surface mining on land from the former Sharlston Colliery.

The village also boasts 5-time Pontefract League Division One Champions, 1-time National Village Semi-finalists and 1-time Dyson-Skidmore trophy winners, the Streethouse Cricket Club. The local professional Rugby League club is Featherstone Rovers.
