= Featherstone railway station =

Railway station in West Yorkshire, England

Featherstone
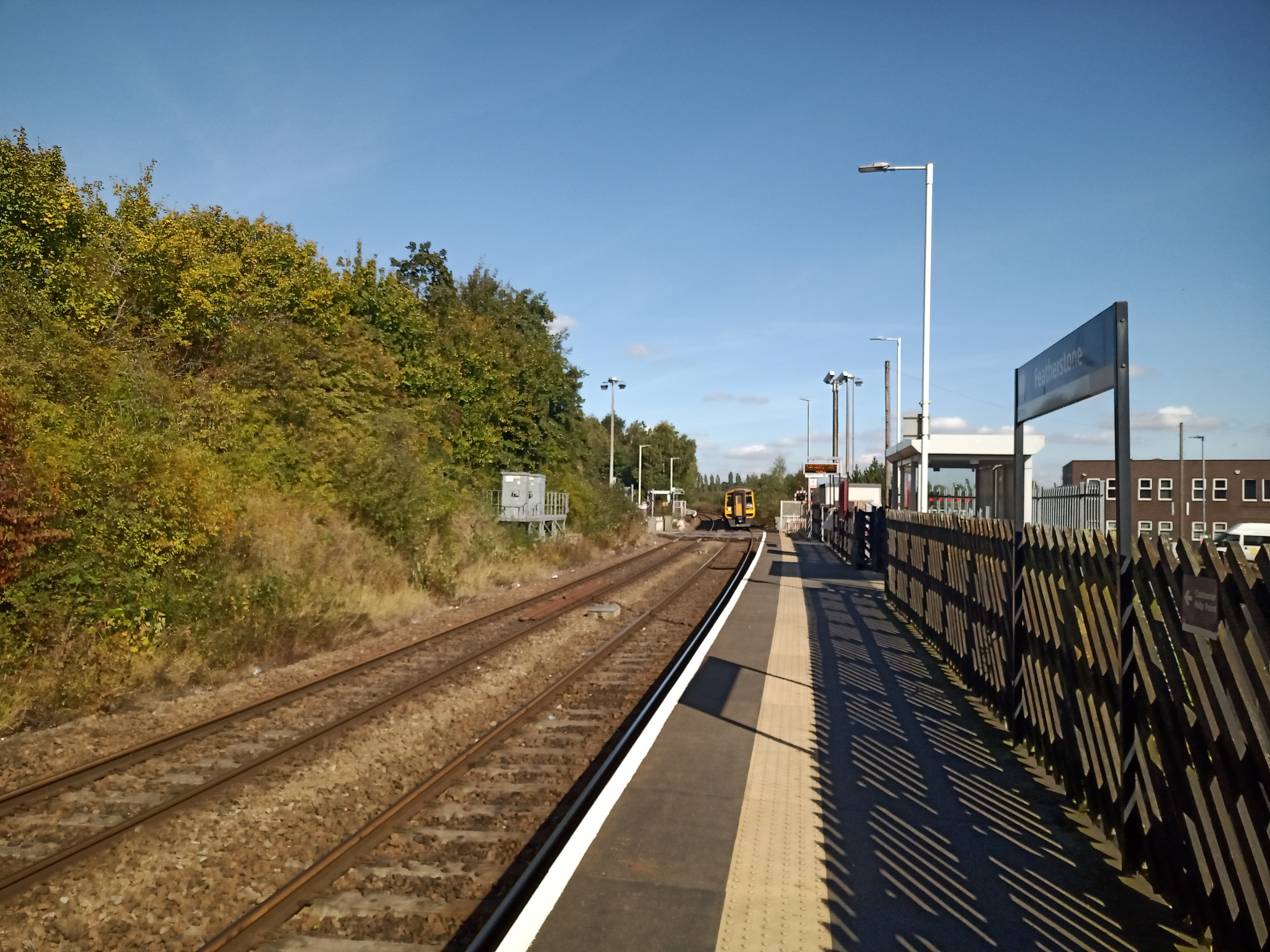
- The view from platform 1, 158905 in Northern livery arriving at platform 1 in September 2024

General information
- Location: Featherstone, City of Wakefield; England
- Coordinates: 53.6793°N 1.3574°W
- Grid reference: SE425205
- Managed by: Northern Trains
- Transit authority: West Yorkshire Metro
- Platforms: 2

Other information
- Station code: FEA
- Fare zone: 3
- Classification: DfT category F2

Key dates
- 1 April 1848: Station opened
- 2 January 1967: Station closed
- 12 May 1992: Station reopened

Passengers
- 2020/21: ▼26,092
- 2021/22: ▲62,352
- 2022/23: ▲65,072
- 2023/24: ▲81,502
- 2024/25: ▲86,004
Location
Notes
- Passenger statistics from the Office of Rail and Road

Featherstone railway station serves the town of Featherstone in West Yorkshire, England. It lies on the Pontefract Line, operated by Northern Trains, 6 miles (10 km) east of Wakefield Kirkgate railway station.

The current station was opened by West Yorkshire Metro on 12 May 1992 when the line between Wakefield and Pontefract was reopened. A previous station on the same site had been closed in January 1967 when passenger services between Wakefield and Pontefract were withdrawn as a result of the Beeching Axe.

== Services ==
During Monday to Saturday, there are hourly train services to Leeds via Wakefield and to Knottingley via Pontefract Monkhill. There are now trains on Sundays. These run two-hourly between Knottingley and Leeds via Wakefield.

Preceding station	National Rail	Following station
Streethouse	Northern Trains Pontefract Line	Pontefract Tanshelf
