= Pontefract Monkhill railway station =

Railway station in West Yorkshire, England

Pontefract Monkhill
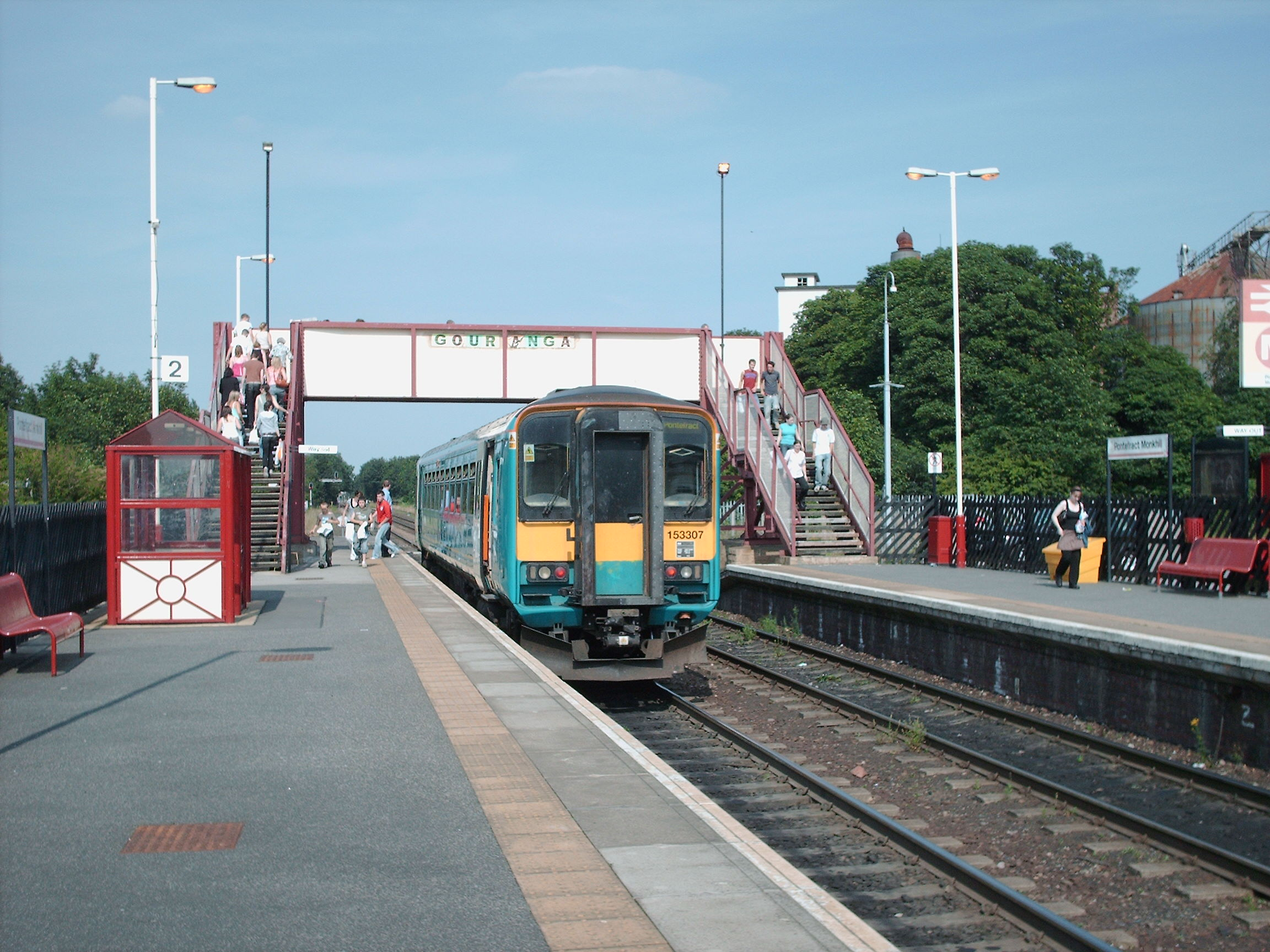
- A Class 153 diesel multiple unit at platform 2, July 2006

General information
- Location: Pontefract, City of Wakefield, England
- Coordinates: 53.6988°N 1.3040°W
- Grid reference: SE460227
- Managed by: Northern Trains
- Transit authority: West Yorkshire Metro
- Platforms: 2

Other information
- Station code: PFM
- Fare zone: 3
- Classification: DfT category F1

History
- Opened: 1 April 1848

Passengers
- 2020/21: ▼78,436
- Interchange: 1,240
- 2021/22: ▲0.229 million
- Interchange: ▲3,670
- 2022/23: ▼0.198 million
- Interchange: ▲4,381
- 2023/24: ▲0.211 million
- Interchange: ▲6,480
- 2024/25: ▲0.229 million
- Interchange: ▲9,912
Location
Notes
- Passenger statistics from the Office of Rail and Road

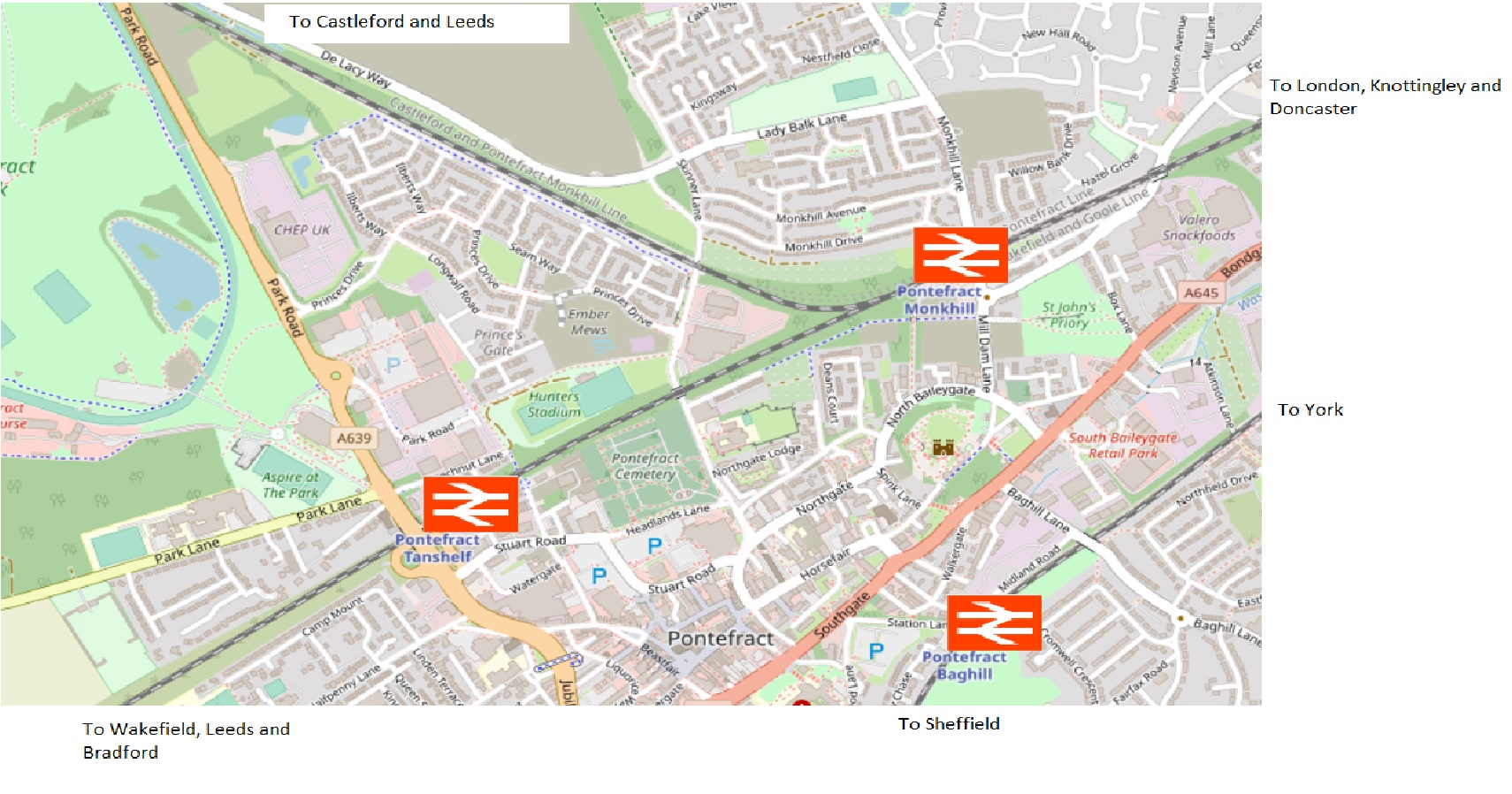
Rail services in Pontefract

Pontefract Monkhill is the busiest railway station in the market town of Pontefract, in West Yorkshire, England. It lies on the Pontefract Line, 14 miles (23 km) south-east of Leeds. The station is managed by Northern Trains, which also provides train services along with Grand Central. The other stations in the town are Pontefract Tanshelf and Pontefract Baghill.

== History ==
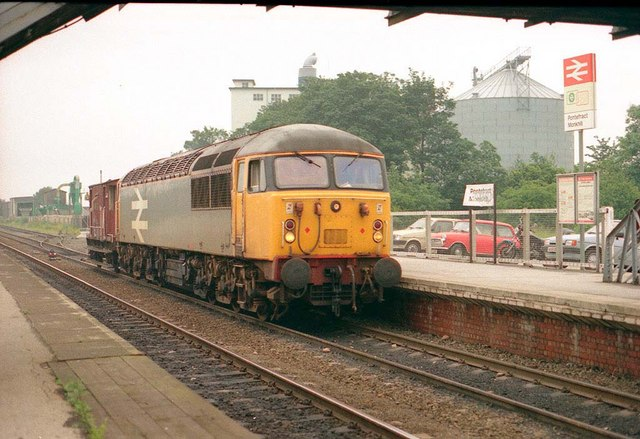
The station in July 1987

The lines to Leeds, via Castleford and Wakefield Kirkgate, separate immediately west of the station, which was opened by the Wakefield, Pontefract & Goole Railway (one of the constituent companies of the Lancashire and Yorkshire Railway) in April 1848. The branch to Castleford (Cutsyke) & Methley Junction was completed the following year (on 1 December) and a pair of short curves were subsequently constructed from the eastern end to link up with the Swinton & Knottingley Joint line following its opening in the spring of 1879. One of these was used by passenger trains between Leeds & Pontefract Baghill until 1964, although it has since been lifted.

The Wakefield to Goole passenger service was withdrawn on 2 January 1967, although trains to and from Goole continued, running instead to Castleford & Leeds. The line remained open to carry coal to the power stations to the east of Knottingley. Services on the Wakefield to Knottingley route were reinstated on 11 May 1992.

== Facilities ==
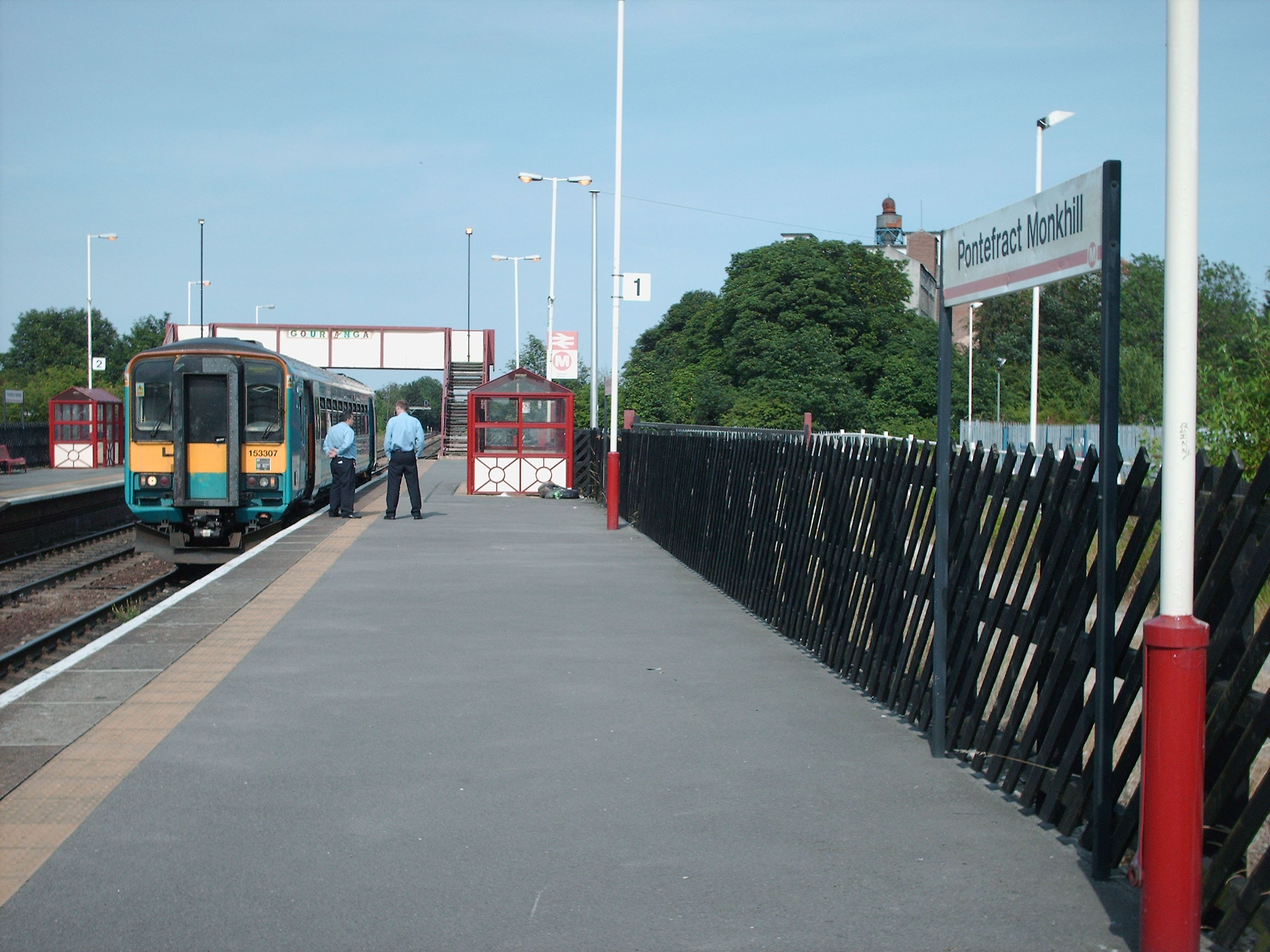
Platform 1

The station is unstaffed and no longer has permanent buildings, other than standard waiting shelters. There is an automated ticket machine on the Leeds-bound platform. There are digital information screens and timetable posters on both platforms, along with a customer help point on platform 1. Step-free access is only available from the car park to platform 1, as platform 2 (towards Knottingley and Goole) can only be reached via the footbridge (which has stairs).

== Services ==
The station is served by two train operating companies:

Northern Trains:

- On Mondays to Saturdays, there is a generally half-hourly service between Leeds and Knottingley. In the Leeds direction, alternate trains run via Castleford or Featherstone and Wakefield Westgate. Some trains via Castleford are extended to/from Goole.
- On Sundays, the service is hourly; trains also run alternately via Castleford and Wakefield to Leeds, but no services operate past Knottingley to Goole.

Grand Central:

- There are four southbound services to London King's Cross and two northbound services to Bradford Interchange on weekdays
- On Saturdays, there is one fewer northbound service; there is no service on Sundays.

Preceding station	National Rail	Following station
Glasshoughton	Northern Trains Pontefract Line	Knottingley
Pontefract Tanshelf	Northern Trains Pontefract Line	Knottingley
Doncaster	Grand Central West Riding	Wakefield Kirkgate
