= West Yorkshire Metro =

Transport organisation in West Yorkshire, England

Metro
- Type: Passenger Transport Executive
- Industry: Public transport
- Founded: 1 April 1974 (Local Government Act 1972)
- Defunct: 1 April 2014 (Brand name still used by West Yorkshire Combined Authority)
- Headquarters: Wellington House, Leeds, England
- Area served: West Yorkshire
- Parent: West Yorkshire Combined Authority
- Website: wymetro.com

Metro is the passenger information brand used by the West Yorkshire Combined Authority in England. It was formed on 1 April 1974 as the West Yorkshire Passenger Transport Executive (WYPTE), at the same time as the metropolitan county of West Yorkshire. The Metro brand has been used from the outset and, since the formal abolition of the WYPTE on 1 April 2014, it has remained the brand name of public transport in the region, overseen by the combined authority which is also responsible for the delivery of transport policies.

On 7 May 2025, it was announced that the Metro brand would be phased out as West Yorkshire introduces bus franchising. On 12 May 2025, the replacement brand Weaver Network was unveiled. The name Weaver Network was chosen to celebrate the region's industrial textile heritage. It is hoped that the Weaver Network will emulate the success of the Bee Network in Greater Manchester.

== Governance ==
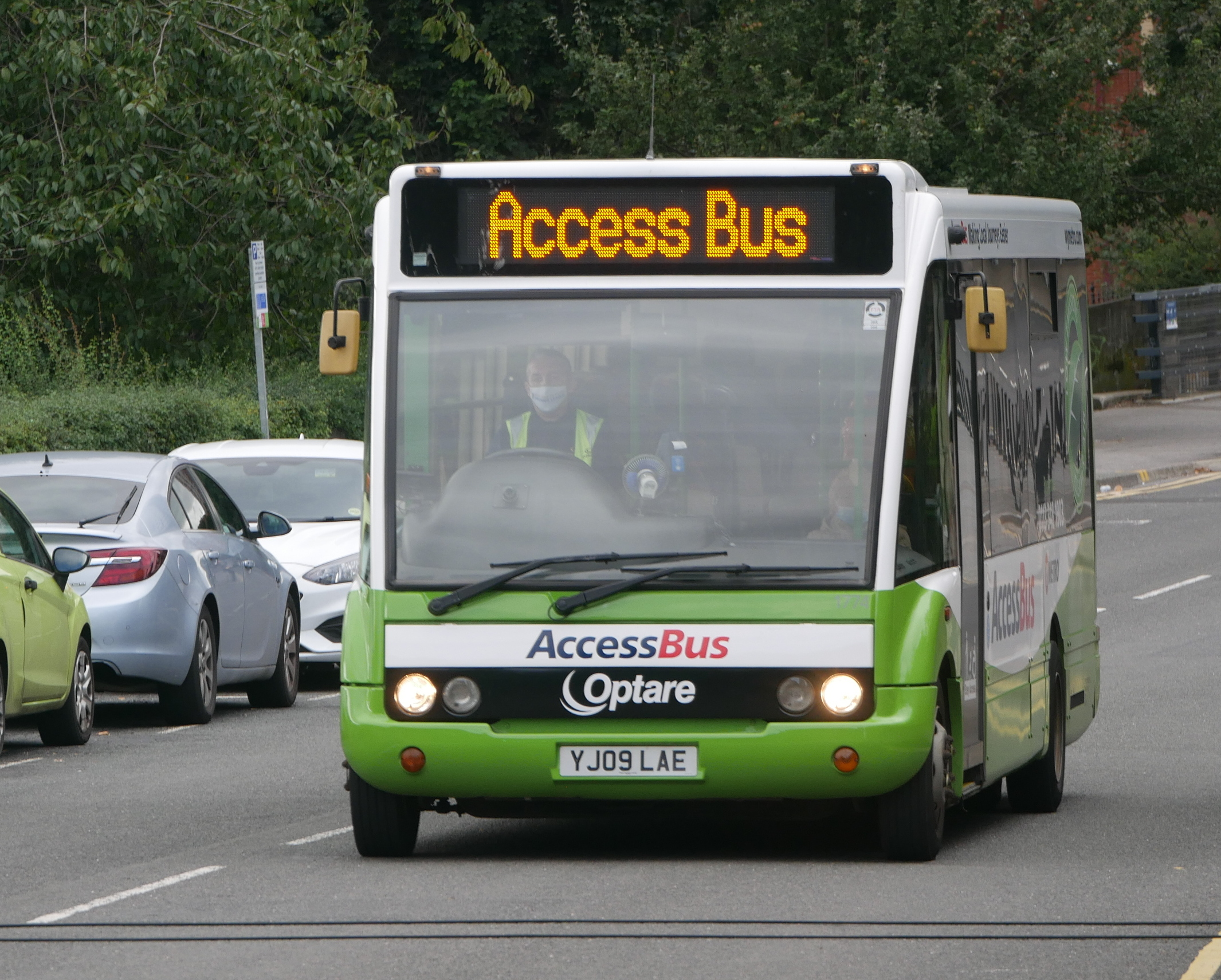
A dial-a-ride Metro AccessBus in Lovell Park, Leeds in September 2021

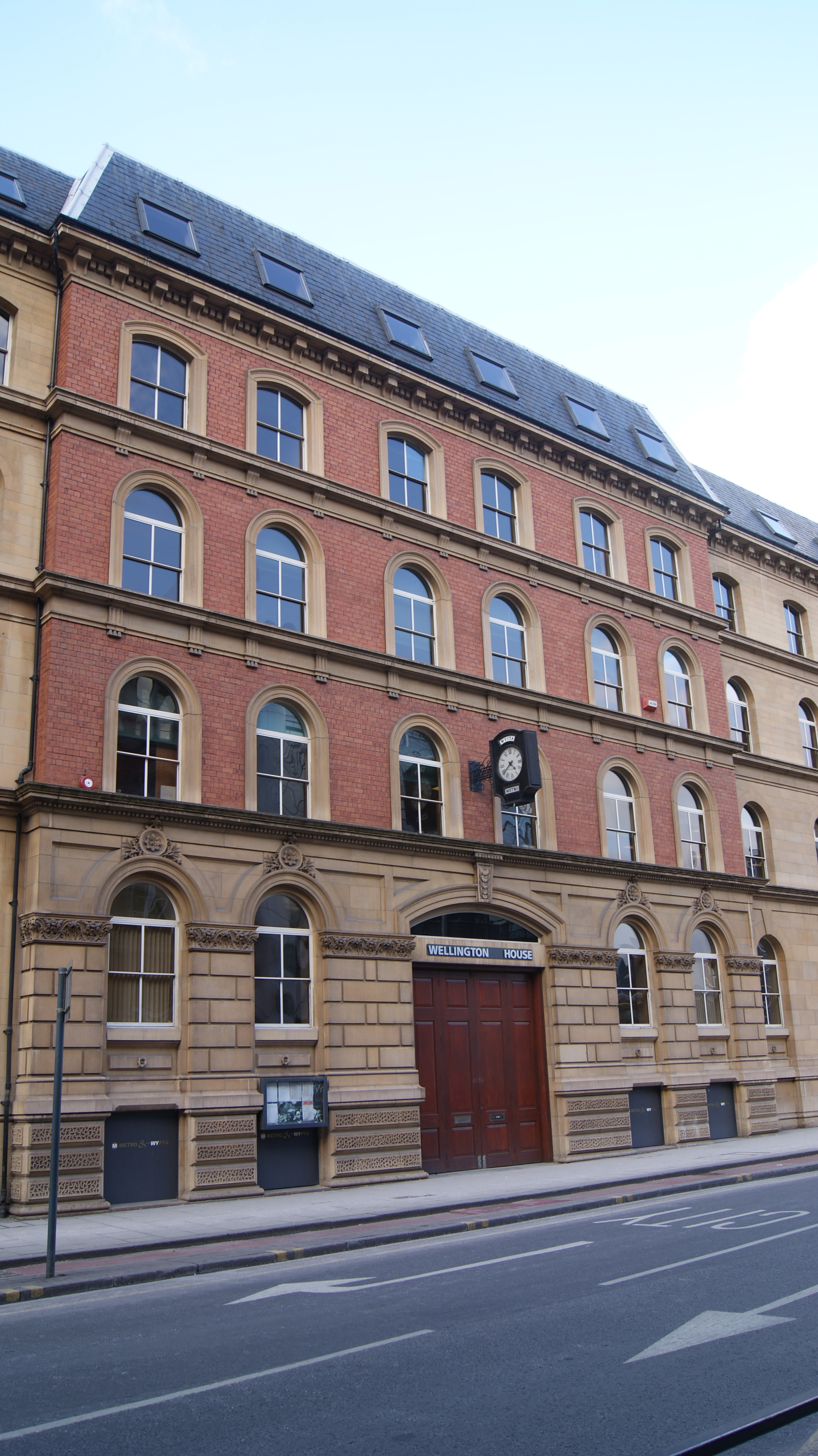
Wellington House in Leeds, the headquarters of West Yorkshire Metro

Metro is a public transport brand of the West Yorkshire Combined Authority which is, through its transport committee, the transport authority for West Yorkshire. It replaced the West Yorkshire Integrated Transport Authority on 1 April 2014. The West Yorkshire County Council was the transport authority from 1 April 1974 until 1 April 1986. It was replaced by the West Yorkshire Passenger Transport Authority that was made up of elected councillors from the districts of West Yorkshire. The West Yorkshire Passenger Transport Authority was renamed the West Yorkshire Integrated Transport Authority following the Local Transport Act 2008. The Metro brand was adopted in 1988.

== MetroBus history ==
Buses are operated by private companies, with early morning, late evening, Sunday and rural services often supported by Metro. There is a special rural bus section, which promotes a combination of minor local links and major long-distance routes.

On 1 April 1974, the West Yorkshire Passenger Transport Executive was created by merging the municipal bus fleets of Bradford City Transport, Leeds City Transport, Huddersfield Corporation Passenger Transport and Halifax Joint Omnibus Committee, which earlier in the 1970s took over the Todmorden Joint Omnibus Committee. The operation was divided into four districts and a new livery of cream and green, officially termed 'Verona green and buttermilk', was introduced, replacing Bradford's light blue and cream, Huddersfield's red and cream, Leeds' two-tone green and Halifax's orange, green & cream.

Created following the Local Government Act 1972, the Executive had to operate within the policy guidelines of the County Council Public Transport Committee, coordinating the operation of all public transport in the county. The Executive inherited approximately 1,500 buses along with 6,000 staff and the associated garages and street furniture.

The Executive relinquished ownership of local buses following the Transport Act 1985, creating arms-length operating companies. It continued to coordinate public transport as the West Yorkshire Passenger Transport Authority when the metropolitan county was abolished in 1986. New buses were purchased in large numbers at the outset. In 1976 Baddeley Brothers of Holmfirth was purchased providing the PTE with additional coaching and stage-carriage duties. In 1980 the Baddeley Brothers business was also disposed of, although the Metrocoach operation was retained.

=== Fleet livery ===
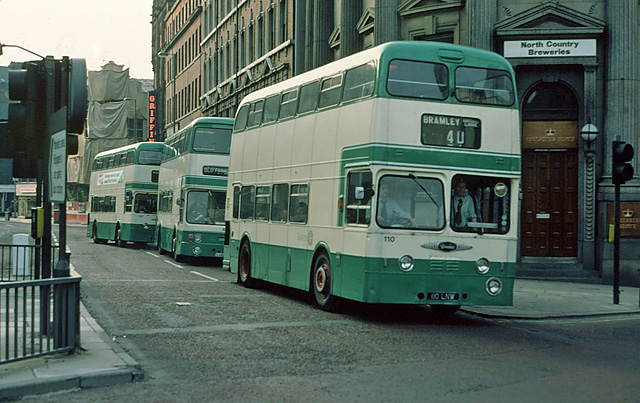
West Yorkshire PTE Daimler Fleetlines in Leeds in August 1979

In 1976 modifications were made to the livery. Originally there were three stripes at the sides of the destination box, which wrapped round to the sides and swept down. This took time to apply, and a trial was made with one thin line. In 1977 the lines were removed and the green area at the skirting of was raised up, so there was slightly more green. The other change was the fleet name to MetroBus in 1976, removing the district names.

On 25 April 1977, the PTE acquired the old-established Kinsley based United Services from WR & P Bingley. As well as providing the PTE with more coaching operations, this took it into an area of West Yorkshire where it had previously had no presence. United Services was maintained as a separate subsidiary and retained its distinctive blue livery, whilst a new livery of red & ivory was adopted for the PTE's coaches, which operated under the "Metrocoach" banner, with brown added for "Metrocoach Executive". Later Bingley's depot received double-deckers transferred from the Leeds District. In early 1981 a reorganisation of operating districts was implemented with the East District becoming responsible for the Leeds depots and United Services, whilst the West District took control of Bradford, Halifax, Todmorden and Huddersfield.

=== New integrated bus system ===
In July 1981, MetroBus and the National Bus Company (NBC) formed a new integrated transport system known as the "Metro-National Transport Company Limited". All PTE and NBC buses began to appear with a new emblem, which consisted of the MetroBus WY's in one box and the NBC "double N" or "N-blem" appearing in another to the right of the PTE emblem, and slightly lower. The boxes were linked to show the integration. They also appeared with MetroBus fleetnames with "The easy way from here to there in West Yorkshire". The new "Metrobus" fleetname being applied not only to PTE owned vehicles on which WYPTE lettering was carried beneath the fleet name, but also buses of NBC subsidiaries West Yorkshire Road Car Company, West Riding Automobile Company, Yorkshire Woollen Transport Company and Yorkshire Traction, carrying "West Yorkshire", "West Riding", "Yorkshire" and "Yorkshire Traction" names below the Metrobus name. Some years later some of those buses (excluding Yorkshire Traction) were repainted into the PTEs verona cream and buttermilk livery so as to present a corporate image. From this date the "WY" logo on the front of buses was replaced by the "Metro-National" emblem in mid-1983, to celebrate 100 years of public transport in Huddersfield, MetroBus paint two vehicles in old liveries: Leyland Atlanteans carried Huddersfield Corporation red livery and Huddersfield Corporation Tramways livery. They became "Building on a Great Tradition" vehicles and were in those liveries until the late 1990s.

=== Deregulation ===
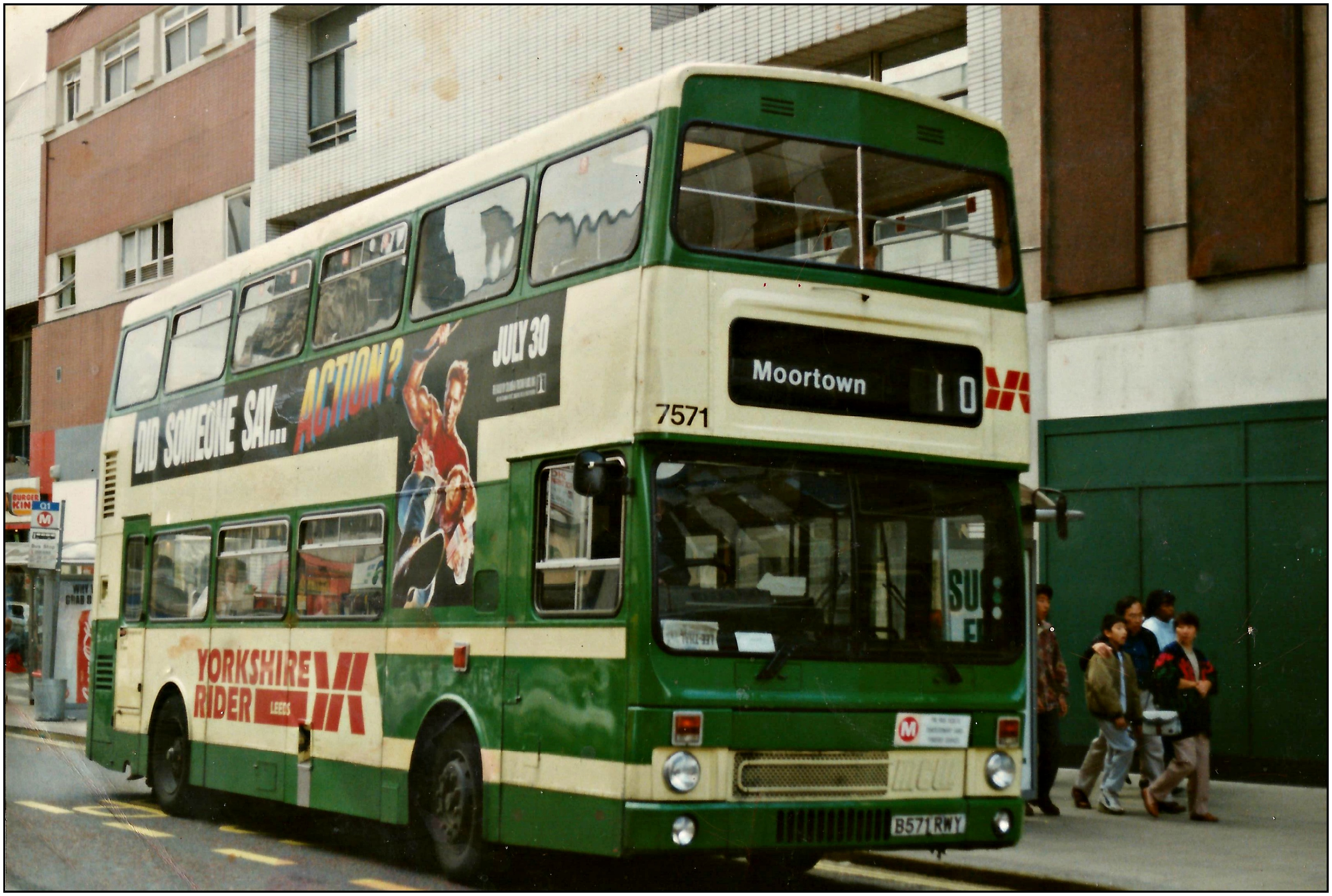
A Yorkshire Rider MCW Metrobus in Leeds in August 1993

Deregulation occurred on 26 October 1986. The WYPTE bus division was renamed Yorkshire Rider and with it a new livery of dark olive green and cream and a stylised "YR" emblem. Five double-decker buses were operated in each of the municipal council's colours (already included were the two Huddersfield buses), with words on the sides between the decks saying "Building on a Great Tradition". The bus services and fare/bus pass/timetables division was renamed Metro.

=== 'My bus' school bus services ===
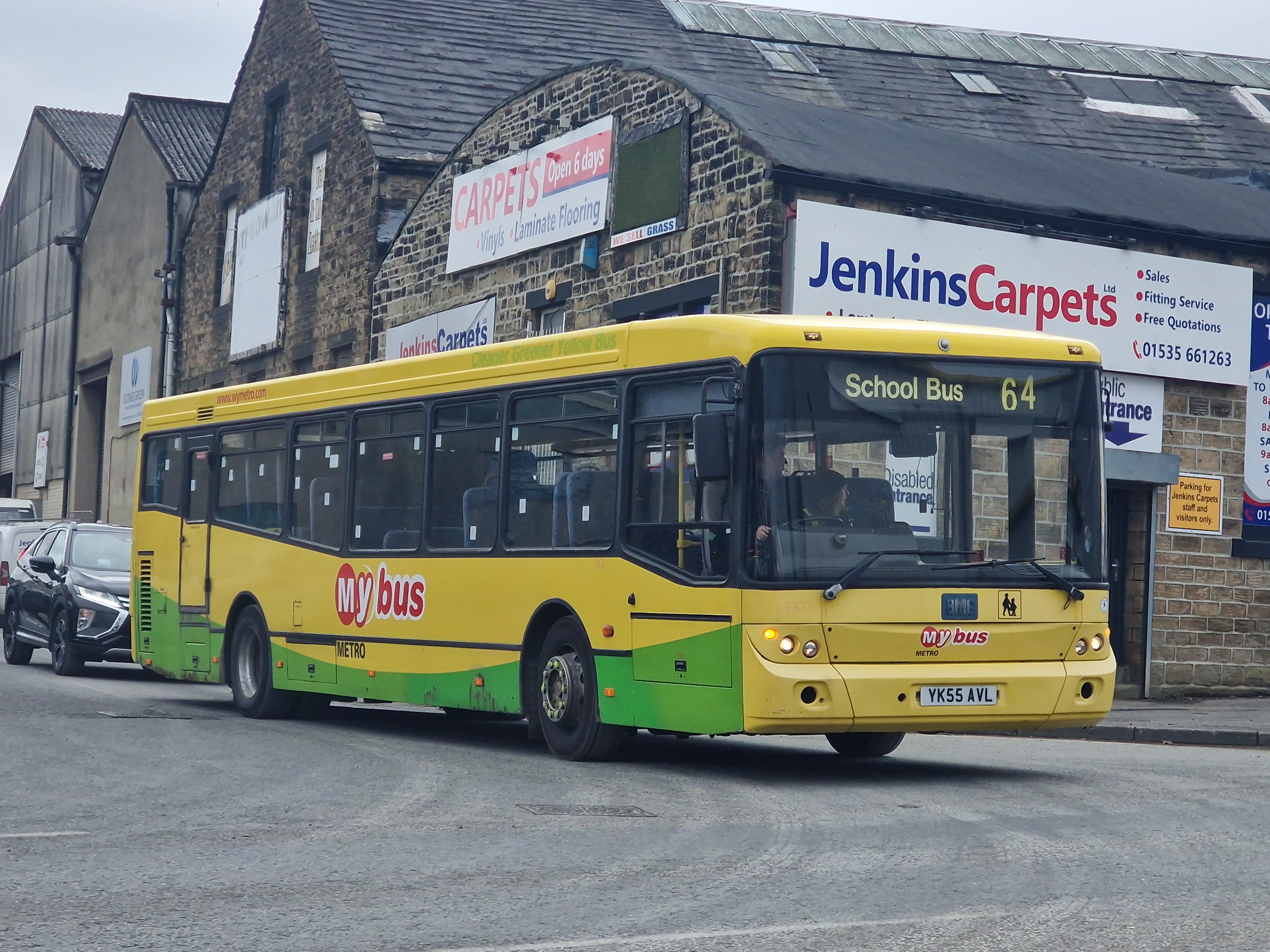
My bus BMC Condor school bus in Keighley in March 2025

My bus is a school bus service launched in November 2004 by West Yorkshire Metro with certain features which set it apart from normal school transport services in the United Kingdom:

- A dedicated fleet of school buses (rather than ordinary transit buses or coaches borrowed from other duties); additional use of these vehicles is limited to school and young-person focused activities and all have low floors and seat belts
- Drivers with enhanced DBS checks, who permanently assigned to each route, assisted on some routes by volunteer escorts
- A bus seat is permanently assigned to each student
- In-school education campaigns to support the service

The service, using a fleet of up to 200 specialist buses produced by BMC and Blue Bird, each painted yellow with coordinated My bus branding and fitted to a 3+2 seating configuration with seatbelts as standard, gained significant mode shift: 64% of primary school users were previously driven by car. Under this scheme, these buses were not allowed to be used for non-school purposes. West Yorkshire Metro claims benefits from 'My bus' range from reductions in car use, traffic congestion, air pollution, traffic accidents, social exclusion, truancy and late student arrivals and improvements to education, safety for pedestrians and cyclists, integration of people with special needs and children's experiences of public transport.

As of August 2009, My bus contractors included City Travel, First Student UK (First Calderdale & Huddersfield, First Leeds), Halifax Joint Committee, HCT Group, Keighley & District, Rollinson Safeway, Tiger Blue and TLC Travel. Withdrawals of the BMC school buses began in May 2018 as they began to reach the end of their service lives, and reviews undertaken by the West Yorkshire Combined Authority saw 'My bus' services to primary schools in Ilkley and Bradford withdrawn between 2023 and 2025.

=== Current operators ===
As of 2012 the following companies are owned by WYPTE, subject to Metro conditions and ticketing:

- Metroconnect Accessbus in WYPTE Area.

== Rail service ==
West Yorkshire MetroTrain

Overview
- Locale: West Yorkshire
- Transit type: Suburban rail
- Number of lines: 12
- Annual ridership: 34.9 million (2014–15)

Operation
- Operator: Northern Trains
System map

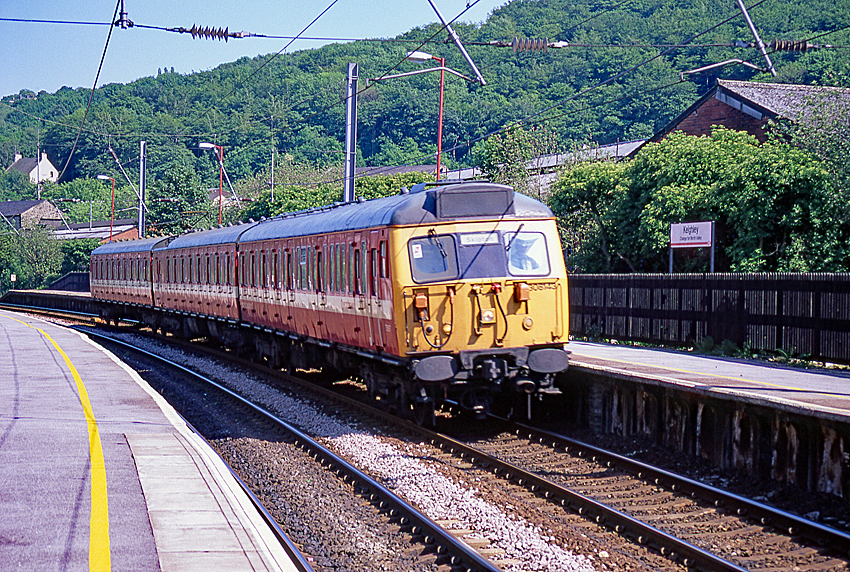
308143 in West Yorkshire PTE livery at Keighley in 1996

Suburban services within West Yorkshire and the surrounding areas, part funded by Metro, were advertised under the MetroTrain brand. In the 1990s, some Class 141, 144, 155, 158, 308, 321 and 333s were painted in Metro livery. The Class 333 was painted in Metro livery when built. All apart from the 333s were later repainted in Northern Rail livery. Some of the 144s and 155s were originally purchased by the WYPTE but were later sold to Porterbrook. Metro retained ownership of the 158 and 321s which were leased to the Northern franchise holder.

=== Routes ===
There are 12 commuter and inter-city railway lines serving West Yorkshire: Airedale, Calder Valley Line, Dearne Valley, Hallam, Harrogate, Huddersfield, Leeds-Bradford, Penistone, Pontefract, Wakefield, Wharfedale and York & Selby.

The majority of these lines run into Leeds and most continue into neighbouring areas, serving towns and cities such as Barnsley, Blackpool, Doncaster, Harrogate, Liverpool, Manchester, Nottingham, Preston, Sheffield and York. Some lines overlap each other, which means that stations such as Castleford, Huddersfield and Wakefield Westgate are served by more than one line.

Most lines have frequent services, but the Dearne Valley line has a limited service of two trains a day in each direction.

In the following list of routes in West Yorkshire, places shown in bold are where services terminate, places shown in italics are stations located outside of West Yorkshire.

Airedale Line	Calder Valley Main Line	Dearne Valley Line	Hallam Line	Harrogate Line	Huddersfield Line
Operators: Northern, LNER: **Leeds**; Apperley Bridge; Shipley; then: Frizinghall; **Bradford Forster Square**; or: Saltaire; Bingley; Crossflatts; Keighley; Steeton & Silsden; Cononley^{1}; **Skipton**^{1}; then continues along Settle-Carlisle Line to: Settle; **Carlisle**; or continues along Leeds-Morecambe Line to: Lancaster; **Morecambe**	Operators: Northern, Grand Central: **Leeds**; Bramley; New Pudsey; **Bradford Interchange**; Halifax; then: Brighouse; **Huddersfield**; or: Sowerby Bridge; Mytholmroyd; Hebden Bridge; then: Burnley Manchester Road; Accrington; Blackburn; Preston; **Blackpool North**; or: Todmorden; Walsden; Littleborough; Smithy Bridge; Rochdale; Castleton; Mills Hill; Moston; **Manchester Victoria**	Operator: Northern: **York**^{2}; Ulleskelf^{2}; Church Fenton^{2}; Sherburn-in-Elmet^{2}; Pontefract Baghill^{2}; Moorthorpe^{2}; Swinton^{2}; Rotherham Central ^{2}; Meadowhall ^{2}; **Sheffield** ^{2}	Operator: Northern: **Leeds**; Woodlesford; Castleford; Normanton; Wakefield Kirkgate; Darton; Barnsley; Wombwell; Elsecar; Chapeltown; Meadowhall; **Sheffield**; Dronfield; Chesterfield; **Nottingham**	Operators: Northern, LNER: **Leeds**; Burley Park; Headingley; **Horsforth**; Weeton^{1}; Pannal^{1}; Hornbeam Park^{1}; **Harrogate**^{1}; Starbeck; **Knaresborough**; Cattal; Hammerton; Poppleton; **York**	Operators: Northern, TransPennine Express: **Leeds**; Cottingley; Morley; Batley; Dewsbury; Ravensthorpe; or: **Wakefield Westgate**; Wakefield Kirkgate; then: Mirfield; then: Brighouse^{3}; or: Deighton; **Huddersfield**; Slaithwaite; Marsden; Greenfield; Mossley; Stalybridge; then: Ashton-under-Lyne; **Manchester Victoria**; or: **Manchester Piccadilly**; then: **Manchester Airport**; or: Manchester Oxford Road; Warrington Central; **Liverpool Lime Street**

Leeds/Bradford Line	Penistone Line	Pontefract Line	Wakefield Line	Wharfedale Line	York & Selby Line
Operators: Northern, LNER: **Leeds**; then: Bramley; New Pudsey; **Bradford Interchange**; or: Apperley Bridge; Shipley; Frizinghall; **Bradford Forster Square**	Operators: Northern: **Huddersfield**; Lockwood; Berry Brow; Honley; Brockholes; Stocksmoor; Shepley; Denby Dale; Penistone; Silkstone Common; Dodworth; Barnsley; Wombwell; Elsecar; Chapeltown; Meadowhall; **Sheffield**	Operators: Northern, Grand Central: Leeds; Woodlesford; Castleford; Glasshoughton; Pontefract Monkhill; then: **Knottingley**; Whitley Bridge^{2}; Hensall^{2}; Snaith^{2}; Rawcliffe^{2}; **Goole**^{2}; or: Pontefract Tanshelf; Featherstone; Streethouse; **Wakefield Kirkgate**; **Wakefield Westgate**^{2}	Operators: Northern, LNER, CrossCountry: **Leeds**; Outwood; Wakefield Westgate; Sandal & Agbrigg; Fitzwilliam; then: Moorthorpe; Thurnscoe; Goldthorpe; Bolton-on-Dearne; Swinton; Rotherham Central; Meadowhall; **Sheffield**; or: South Elmsall; Adwick; Bentley; **Doncaster**	Operator: Northern: **Bradford Forster Square**; Frizinghall; Shipley; Baildon; or: **Leeds**; then: Guiseley; Menston; Burley-in-Wharfedale; Ben Rhydding; **Ilkley**	Operators: Northern, TransPennine Express, CrossCountry: **Leeds**; Cross Gates; Garforth; East Garforth; Micklefield; then: South Milford; Selby; Brough; **Hull**; or: Church Fenton; Ulleskelf; **York**; continues to Middlesbrough, Newcastle and Scarborough

Notes:

1	Although stations are in North Yorkshire, MetroCards are valid at these stations
2	Limited Service only
3	Service continues along Caldervale Line to Manchester Victoria via Hebden Bridge

=== Re-opened stations ===
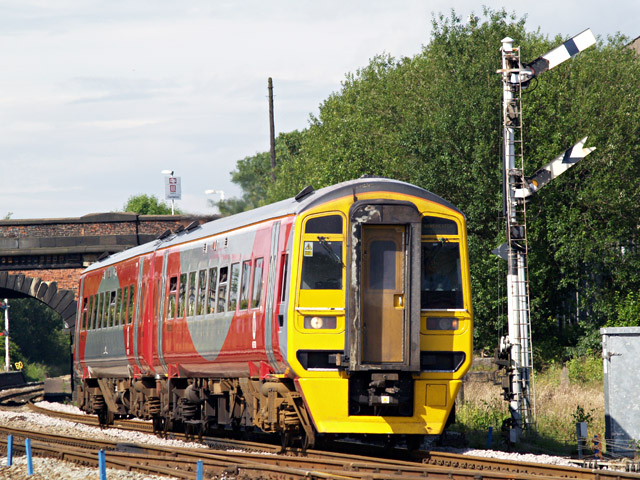
Northern Rail Metro liveried 158906 at Castleton in July 2007

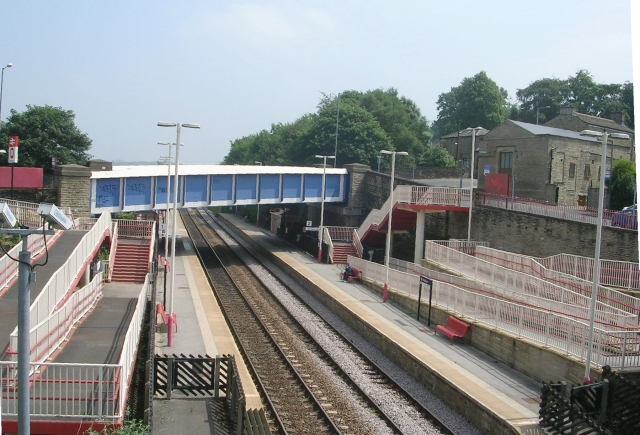
Brighouse station in June 2009

WYPTE has had a programme of reopening railway stations throughout its existence and has opened or reopened over 20 stations:

- 1982 – Deighton, Fitzwilliam, Crossflatts and Slaithwaite
- 1983 – Bramley
- 1984 – Saltaire
- 1987 – East Garforth, Sandal & Agbrigg and Frizinghall
- 1988 – Burley Park, Outwood, Cottingley and Cononley (just outside West Yorkshire but since 2009 part of the WYPTE area, which now extends to Skipton)
- 1989 – Berry Brow
- 1990 – Walsden and Steeton & Silsden
- 1992 – Streethouse, Featherstone, Pontefract Tanshelf, on 12 May, when the line between Pontefract Monkhill and Wakefield Kirkgate reopened to passengers
- 2000 – Brighouse, when the Halifax to Huddersfield link re-opened to passengers
- 2005 – Glasshoughton
- 2015 – Apperley Bridge
- 2016 – Kirkstall Forge
- 2017 – Low Moor

White Rose Centre had been expected to open in 2023. The station was to replace nearly Cottingley station, due to its close proximity. Consequently, Cottingley would close, and this was ratified by The Office of Road and Rail in February 2023. However, construction was halted in March 2024 due to increased costs, and as of August 2024 it was unclear when construction would resume.

Elland is due to re-open in the middle of the decade. Planning permission was given in March 2023, and construction is expected to begin in 2024 for a potential opening date of December 2025.

Also planned is a station at Thorpe Park, and a station serving Leeds Bradford Airport is also proposed.

=== Operators ===
Most local services are run by Northern Trains, and longer-distance routes are served by TransPennine Express, London North Eastern Railway, CrossCountry and Grand Central.

== Leeds Supertram ==
In 2001, Metro came up with Leeds Supertram, with the idea of bringing back a tram network for Leeds. After the original scheme exceeded its budget, the Government asked Metro to look at ways of reducing costs. In spring 2005 Metro went back to the Government with a re-costed plan but the Secretary of State for Transport Alistair Darling rejected the proposal after the 2005 general election. Darling responded by pointing to plans by a private bus operator for a bus system where the vehicles were designed to look like trams.

This is not the first time such a scheme has been unsuccessfully pursued. In the mid-1980s the PTE was interested in bringing back trolleybuses in Bradford with Yorkshire Rider awarded a contract to operate, but nothing came of it.
