= Pontefract line =

Railway line in Yorkshire, England

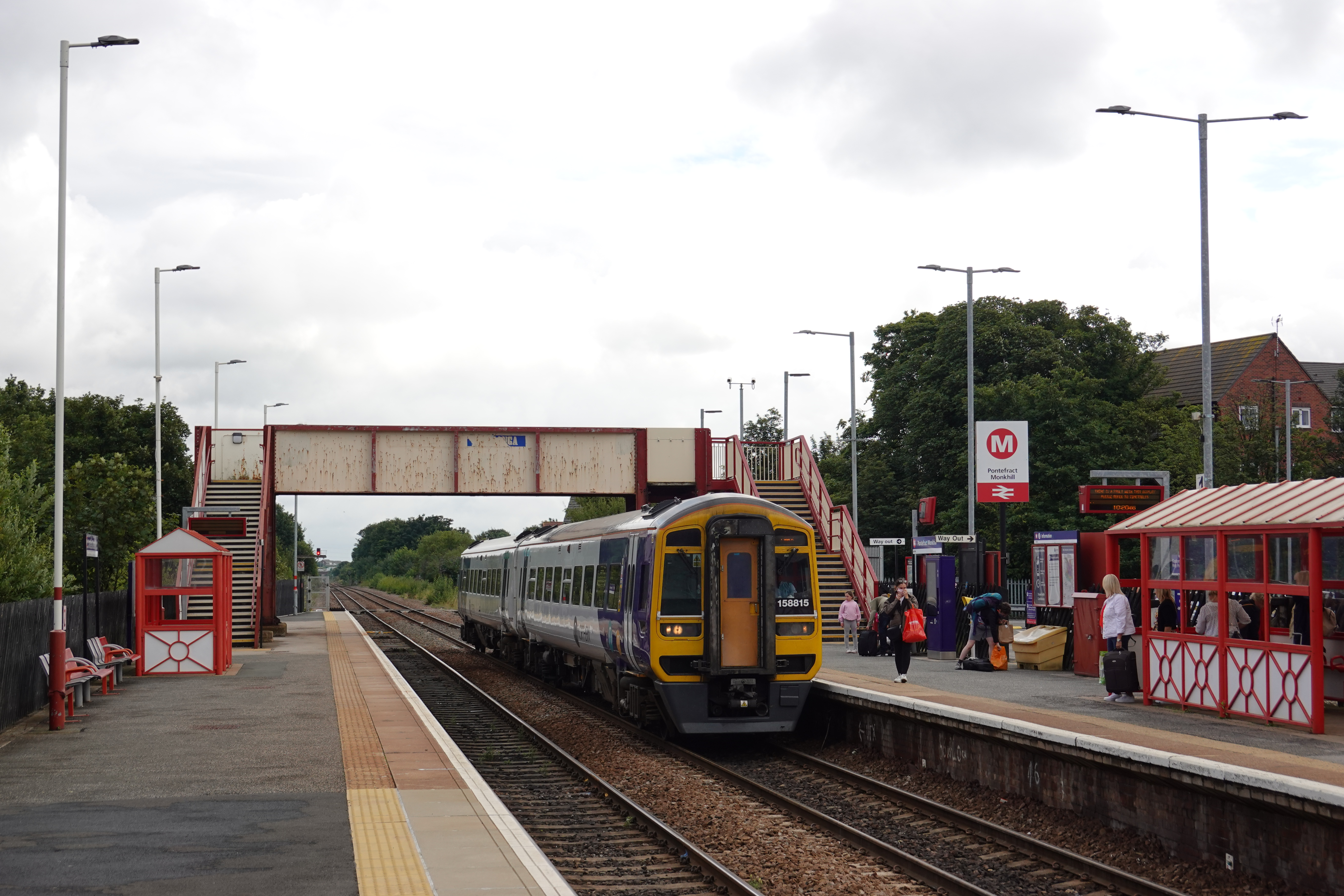
- A Northern Trains Class 158 at Pontefract Monkhill, August 2021

Overview
- Owner: Network Rail
- Locale: Yorkshire and the Humber
- Termini: Leeds, Wakefield Westgate, Goole
- Stations: 16

Technical
- Track gauge: 4 ft 8 1/2 in (1,435 mm) standard gauge
Route map
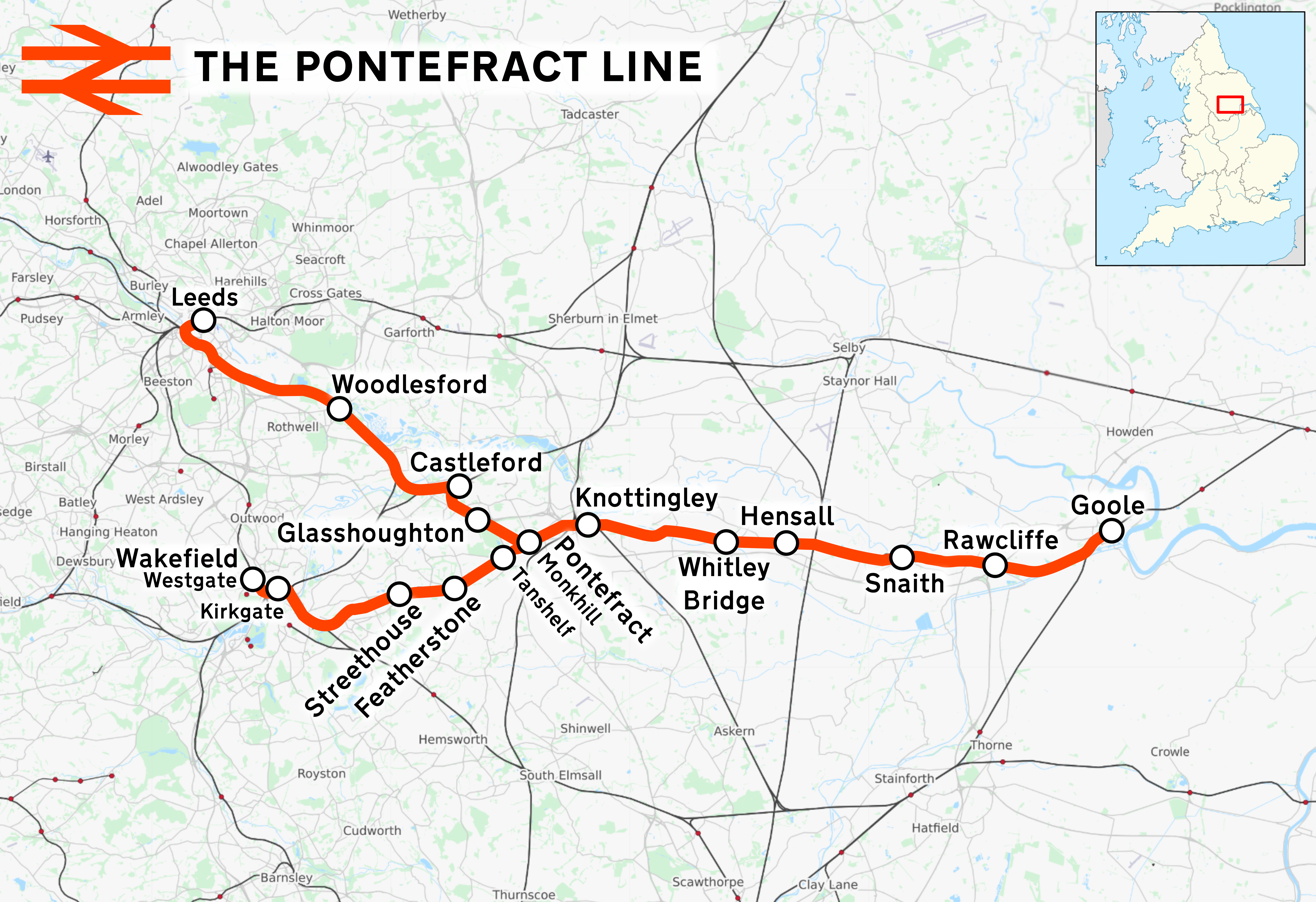
(Click to expand)

The Pontefract line is a West Yorkshire Metro railway route in Yorkshire, England. The route links Wakefield and Leeds with Goole, via Pontefract. The Metro timetable for the line also includes services operated as the Dearne Valley line between York and Sheffield via Pontefract.

The line, which passes through the former mining areas to the east of Wakefield and Castleford, has the greatest number of stations opened by the West Yorkshire Metro. MetroCards are available on the route as far as Knottingley; a limited service continues to Goole by this route.

== History ==
Railways in the area opened as follows:

- 1 April 1848: the Wakefield, Pontefract and Goole Railway opened, which was 27 miles (43 km) in length. This line passed through and served Knottingley, which was then producing some 65,000 tons of burnt lime a year, mainly used for agricultural and building purposes. It was approved under the Wakefield, Pontefract and Goole Railway Act 1845 (8 & 9 Vict. c. cxlii).
- February 1854: the Great Northern Railway (GNR) and Lancashire and Yorkshire Railway (L&YR) jointly administered Knottingley station
- August 1850: Knottingley to Burton Salmon line opened. Trains were able to run from London to York via Knottingley, which was the station to change to and from trains into the heart of the West Riding, and so it became a major junction
- May 1879: The Swinton and Knottingley Railway opened, connecting Sheffield and York via Pontefract; Ferrybridge opened three years later.

Before the 1923 Grouping the lines over which the service operates were owned by:

- Leeds – Methley: Midland Railway (MR)
- Methley – Pontefract (Monkhill) – Goole: L&YR
- Wakefield Westgate station: joint GNR/L&YR
- Wakefield – Pontefract (Monkhill): L&YR

== Route description ==
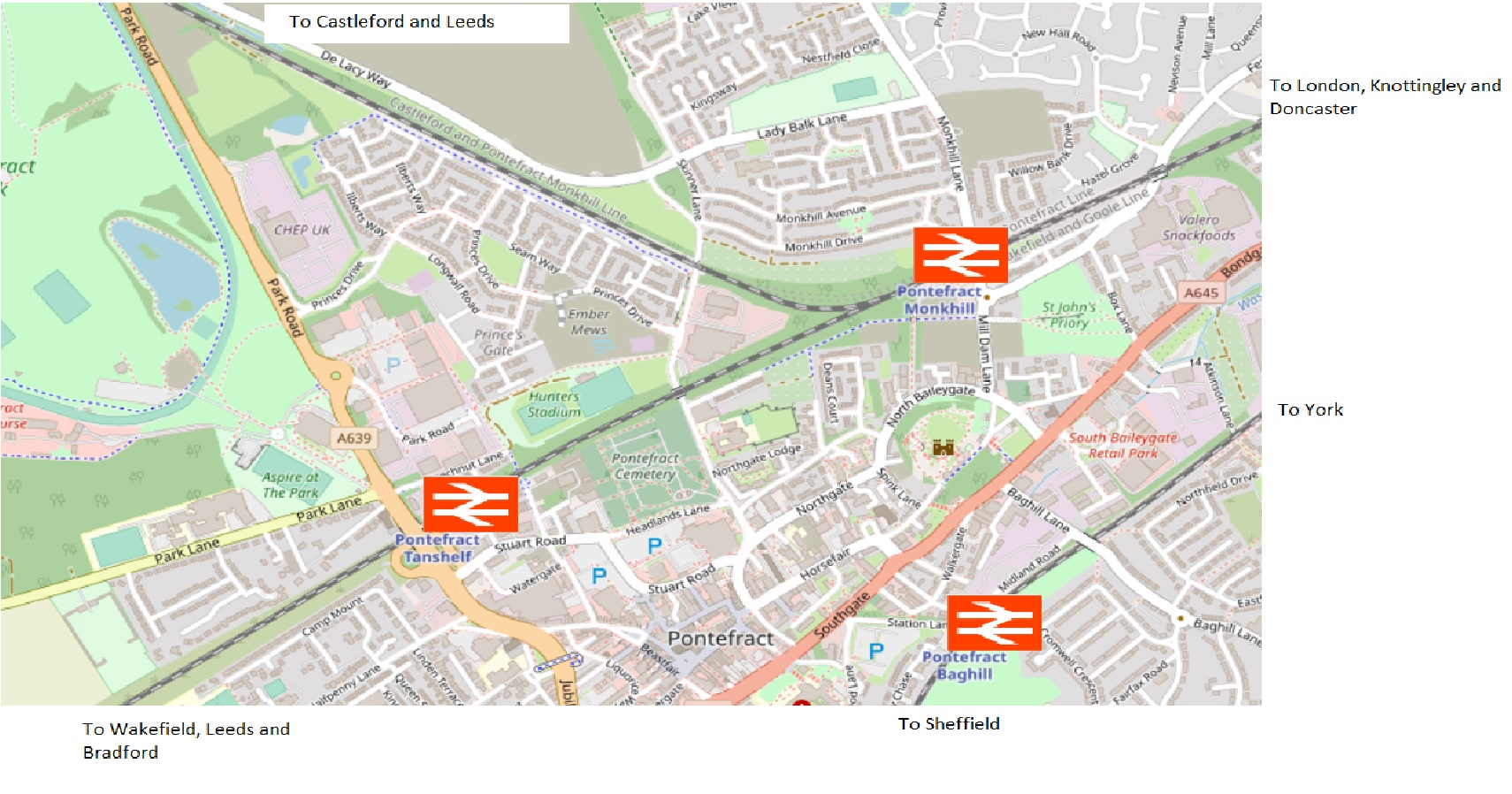
The Pontefract line centres on the town of Pontefract

=== Leeds–Goole ===
Trains using the Pontefract line from Leeds use the same route as the Hallam line to Methley Junction:

- Woodlesford
- here is Methley Junction, where lines of the MR, L&YR and the Great Northern Railway (GNR) converged
- Castleford (also on the Hallam line and Huddersfield line)
- Glasshoughton (opened 21 February 2005)
- Pontefract Monkhill: junction with Wakefield line
- Knottingley: joint L&YR/GNR station. The Dearne Valley line has a junction at this point; there is also the Askern branch line for Doncaster
- Whitley Bridge
- runs under the East Coast Main Line
- Hensall: junction for the Hull and Barnsley Railway (HBR – now to Drax); and the joint GCR/HBR line crossed the line about a mile further east
- Snaith
- Rawcliffe
- Oakhills Junction with the Selby–Goole line closed in 1964
- Goole.

==== Wakefield–Pontefract ====
The Wakefield service joins the Leeds service at Pontefract; the stations served for this section are:

- Wakefield Westgate (also served by the Wakefield line): the station was jointly owned by GCR and GNR; to the south was the West Riding and Grimsby Joint Railway (also owned by those companies)
- Wakefield Kirkgate, the previous terminus for most services on this line
- leaving Wakefield, there were a large number of junctions between there and Crofton
- there were two stations on this line serving Crofton and Sharlston
- Streethouse
- Featherstone
- Pontefract Tanshelf
- Pontefract Monkhill, where the Leeds line joins.

== Service ==
Both services now run hourly to Leeds from Knottingley; this provides a combined half-hourly service between Knottingley, Pontefract Monkhill and Leeds.
