= Pontefract Tanshelf railway station =

Railway station in West Yorkshire, England

Pontefract Tanshelf
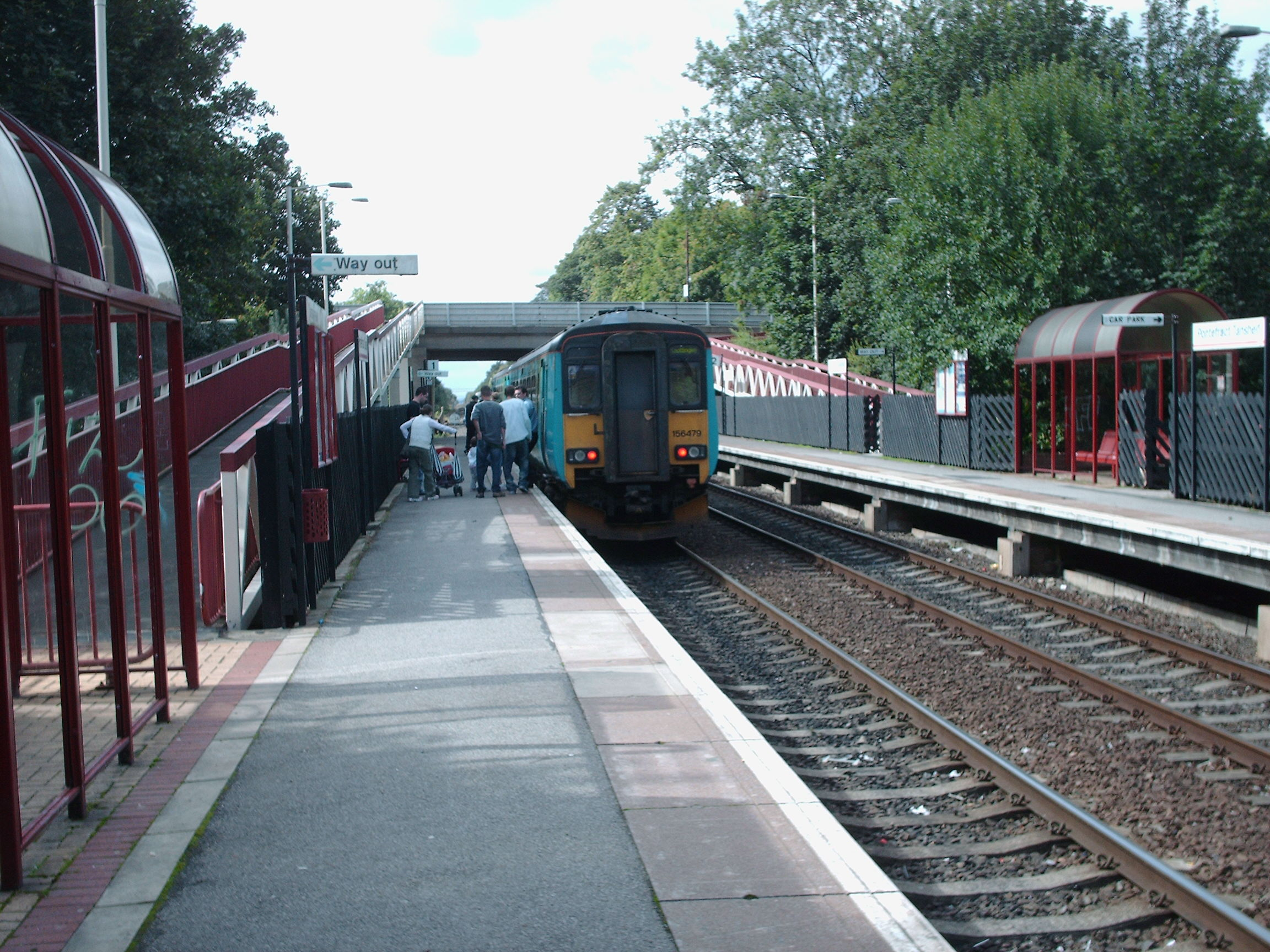
- The view from platform 1, with a Class 156 diesel multiple unit (DMU) calling, August 2006

General information
- Location: Pontefract, City of Wakefield, England
- Coordinates: 53.694°N 1.319°W
- Grid reference: SE450221
- Manager: Northern Trains
- Transit authority: West Yorkshire Metro
- Platforms: 2

Other information
- Station code: POT
- Fare zone: 3
- Classification: DfT category F2

Key dates
- 17 July 1871: Station opened as Tanshelf
- 1 December 1936: Station renamed Pontefract Tanshelf
- 2 January 1967: Station closed
- 11 May 1992: Station reopened

Passengers
- 2020/21: ▼8,388
- 2021/22: ▲30,440
- 2022/23: ▲85,368
- 2023/24: ▲91,090
- 2024/25: ▲98,558
Location
Notes
- Passenger statistics from the Office of Rail and Road

Pontefract Tanshelf is the most central of the three railway stations that serve the market town of Pontefract, in West Yorkshire, England. (Note: The other stations in the town are Pontefract Monkhill and Pontefract Baghill.) It lies on the Pontefract Line, 8 miles (13 km) east of Wakefield Kirkgate, with services operated by Northern Trains. It is the nearest station to Pontefract Racecourse and Beechnut Lane, the home ground of Pontefract Collieries FC.

== History ==
The first station on the site was opened on 17 July 1871 as Tanshelf, being renamed Pontefract Tanshelf on 1 December 1936.

In the days of coal mining in the Pontefract area, the station served the needs of the local workforce with regular and frequent services timed for the beginning and the end of mining shifts. The station is the closest to the former Prince of Wales Colliery which closed in August 2002.

It was closed on 2 January 1967, when the passenger services were diverted away from the direct line to Wakefield Kirkgate, via Featherstone, to serve Leeds via Castleford.

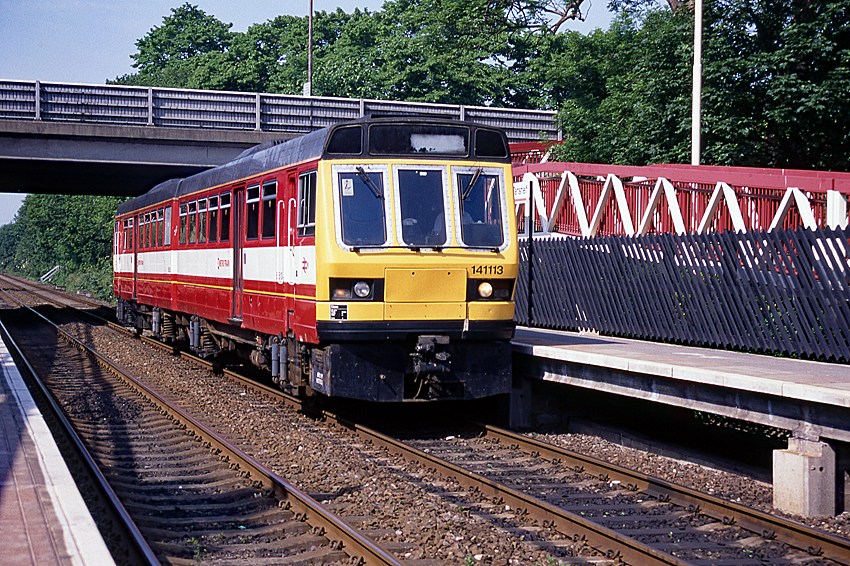
A Class 141 DMU at the platform, June 1996

The present station was opened by West Yorkshire Metro on 11 May 1992, when the line between Wakefield Kirkgate and Pontefract Monkhill was reopened.

Both platforms of Tanshelf are step-free.

== Services ==
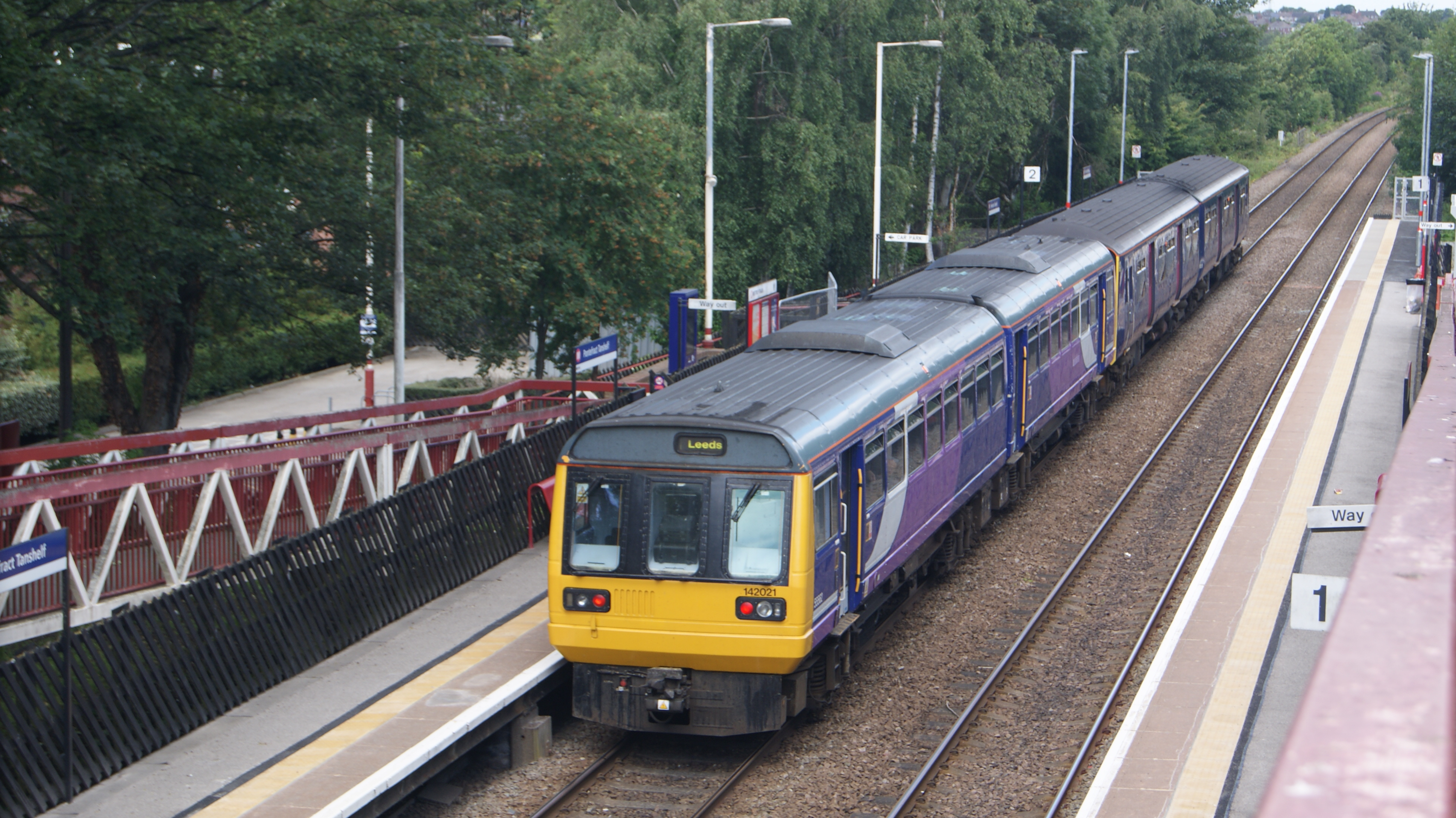
Class 142 and Class 150 DMUs in multiple at the station, July 2019

On Monday to Saturday, there is an hourly service to Wakefield Kirkgate and Leeds, and also hourly to Knottingley. On Sundays, there is a two-hourly service each way to the same destinations.

Preceding station	National Rail	Following station
Featherstone	Northern Trains Pontefract Line	Pontefract Monkhill
