= Wakefield Kirkgate railway station =

Railway station in West Yorkshire, England

Wakefield Kirkgate
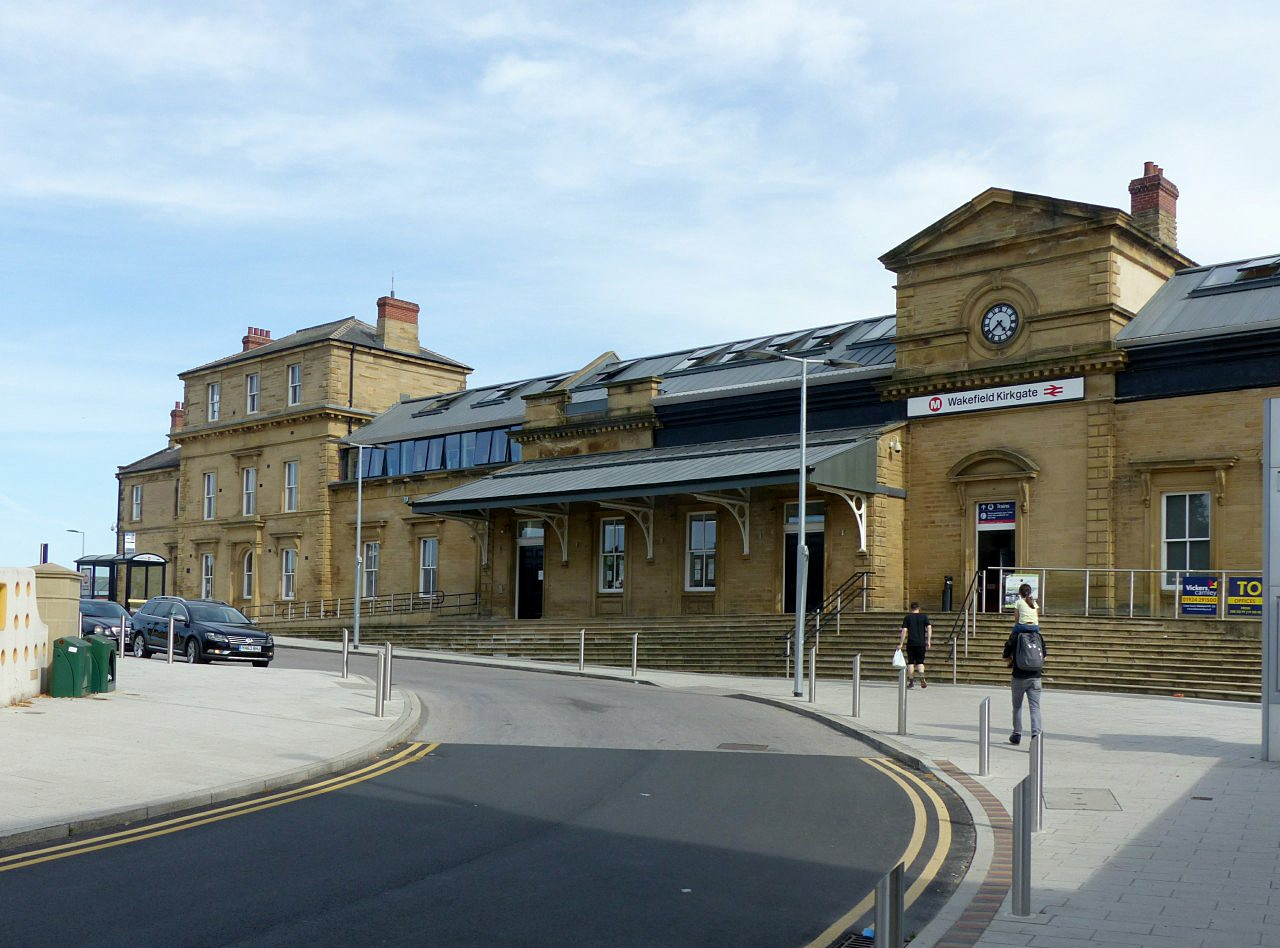
- Station entrance, July 2018

General information
- Location: Wakefield, City of Wakefield, England
- Coordinates: 53.679°N 1.488°W
- Grid reference: SE339204
- Managed by: Northern Trains
- Transit authority: West Yorkshire (Metro)
- Platforms: 3
- Tracks: 4

Other information
- Station code: WKK
- Fare zone: 3
- Classification: DfT category F1

History
- Opened: 5 October 1840
- Original company: Manchester and Leeds Railway
- Pre-grouping: Lancashire and Yorkshire Railway
- Post-grouping: London, Midland and Scottish Railway

Key dates
- 5 October 1840: Station opened

Passengers
- 2020/21: ▼0.115 million
- Interchange: 37,859
- 2021/22: ▲0.380 million
- Interchange: ▲88,600
- 2022/23: ▲0.508 million
- Interchange: ▼82,663
- 2023/24: ▲0.539 million
- Interchange: ▲120,984
- 2024/25: ▲0.612 million
- Interchange: ▲209,305
Location
Notes
- Passenger statistics from the Office of Rail and Road

Wakefield Kirkgate is one of two railway stations in Wakefield, West Yorkshire, England. Unlike nearby Wakefield Westgate, Kirkgate is unstaffed. It is managed by Northern Trains, but also served by Grand Central and TransPennine Express. The station is on the Hallam, Calder Valley, Pontefract and Huddersfield lines, with a limited number of services to London King's Cross. It is situated 47 miles 62 chains (76.9 km) from Manchester Victoria, measured via Rochdale.

== History ==
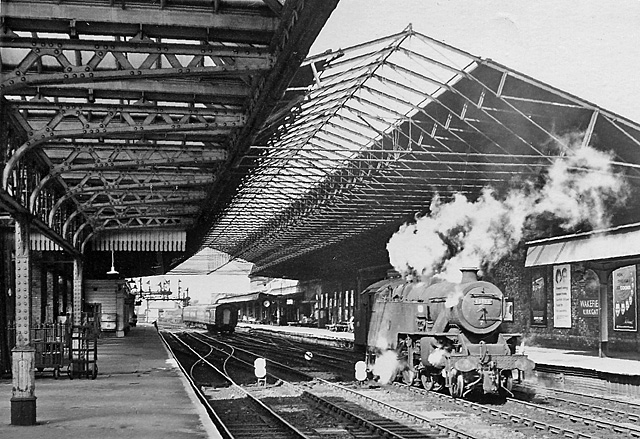
The station seen in 1966

The original Kirkgate station opened by the Manchester and Leeds Railway in 1840; it was the only station in Wakefield until Westgate was opened in 1867. The station building dates from 1854 and is named after the nearby Kirkgate street.

Some demolition work took place in 1972, removing buildings on the island platform and the roof with its original ironwork canopy which covered the whole station. A wall remains as evidence of these buildings. After this, Kirkgate was listed in 1979.

Since Westgate developed as Wakefield's main railway station, Kirkgate was neglected for many years and deteriorated until it was in a poor state of repair. In January 2008, the former goods warehouse was demolished to make way for a depot for Network Rail. In October 2008, part of the station wall collapsed, destroying a parked car.

The station is unstaffed and, despite the presence of CCTV, it suffered from crime. A rape, a serious assault and several robberies took place there. In July 2009, Kirkgate station was visited by Secretary of State for Transport, Lord Adonis, who dubbed it "the worst medium-large station in Britain." Local consensus was that the state of its facilities discouraged its use.

=== Refurbishment 2013–15 ===
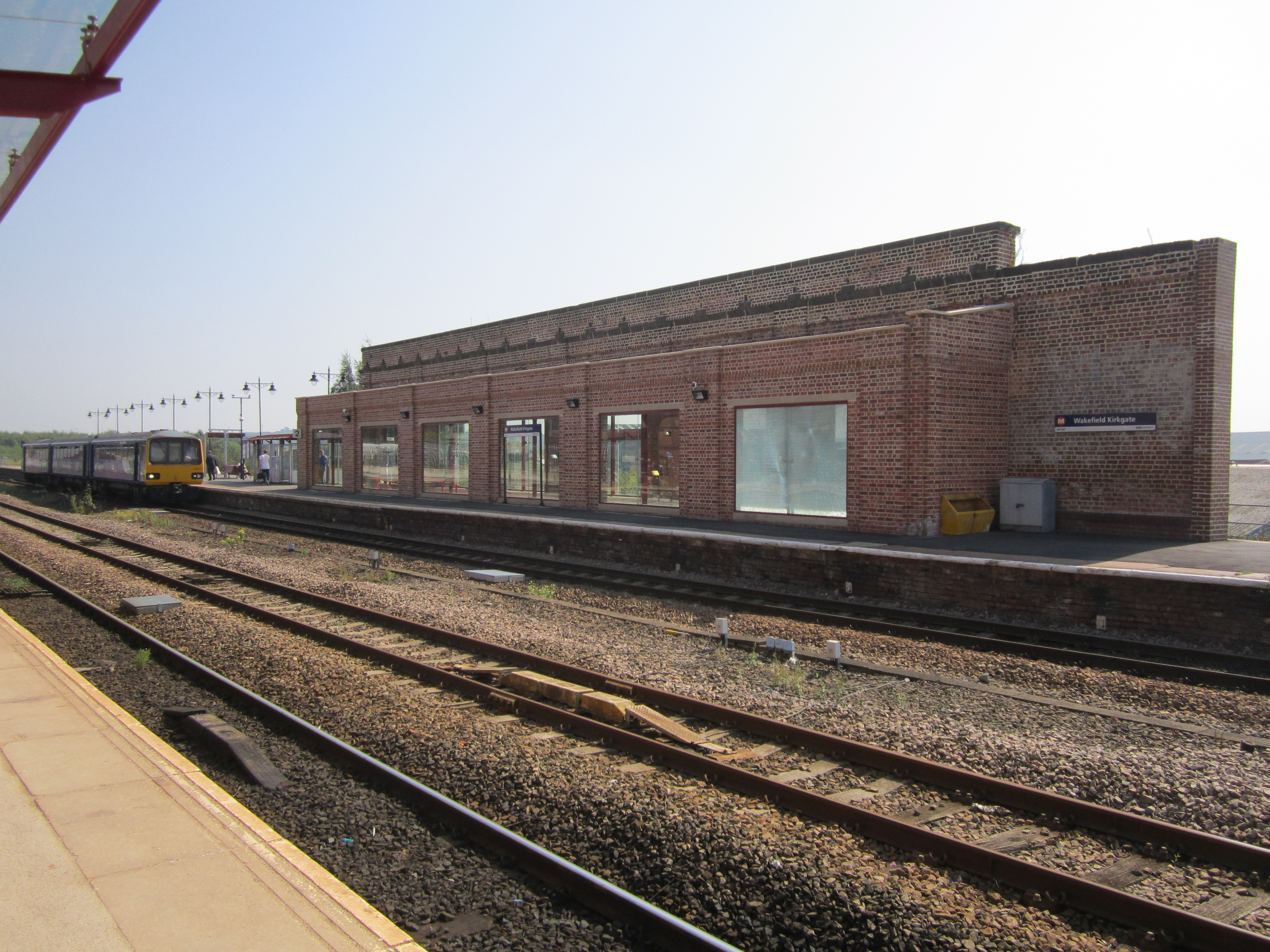
Platforms 2 and 3 after refurbishment in 2013

Following a campaign supported by the Wakefield Express newspaper, plans to redevelop the station were formulated. In July 2011, Wakefield Council was asked to decide upon a £500,000 grant to the environmental regeneration charity Groundwork UK as part of its £4 million Kirkgate project in which new life would be breathed into the area. The proposal was approved and funds raised in March 2013. The work was carried out in two phases between 2013 and 2015.

Work completed by June 2013 included the following items:

- Removal of life-expired and unused canopies
- Refurbishment and reglazing of the Leeds-bound canopy
- Creation of new entrances to the subway
- Installation of electronic information screens on the platforms and entrance hall.

A second phase of work, completed in September 2015, included

- Units for new businesses
- Café
- Retail outlet
- Exhibition spaces
- Meeting rooms for community and local business
- Accommodation for Groundwork Wakefield.

Grand Central opened a first class lounge for its customers in April 2017.

== Passenger volume ==
Historically, figures for annual passenger usage at Kirkgate were comparatively low, with only 769 tickets sold to/from the station in the 2006/07 financial year. However this was because most tickets are bought to "Wakefield Stations", and it was hard to determine the true use of Wakefield Westgate and Kirkgate as separate entities.

Following changes in the way the statistics are collected, Kirkgate's usage figure increased significantly to a value which more accurately reflects its true usage. In 2022/23, 508,000 journeys to and from the station were estimated along with 82,000 interchanges.

Passenger Volume at Wakefield Kirkgate
	2002–03	2004–05	2005–06	2006–07	2007–08	2008–09	2009–10	2010–11	2011–12	2012–13	2013–14	2014–15	2015–16	2016–17	2017–18	2018–19	2019–20	2020–21	2021–22	2022–23
Entries and exits	611	372	564	769	360,356	465,978	529,972	491,362	448,868	488,289	508,015	527,522	534,932	539,478	525,778	524,960	511,034	115,154	380,004	507,772
Interchanges	– (Note: No data available.)	59,346	62,433	61,295	43,848	76,671	71,807	82,345	110,616	129,687	133,896	140,330	143,266	139,251	135,617	208,901	187,301	37,859	88,600	82,663

The statistics cover twelve month periods that start in April.

== Layout ==
The station has three platforms:

- Platform 1: Served by northbound Northern Trains services to Leeds and Castleford, and also by services to and from York.
- Platform 2: Served by southbound Northern Trains services towards Barnsley, Meadowhall Interchange, Sheffield, Lincoln and Nottingham. The newly introduced TransPennine Express service to Manchester Piccadilly, via Huddersfield, also calls at this platform four times each day.
- Platform 3: Served by north-eastbound Northern Trains services towards Knottingley, westbound to Wakefield Westgate and Leeds. Several Grand Central services run each day eastbound towards London King's Cross (which then begin a southbound journey after Doncaster) and westbound towards Bradford Interchange via Halifax.

The island platform consisting of platforms 2 and 3, is linked to platform 1 and the station building by a newly refurbished subway, featuring better lighting and new bright white paint. Art panels were added to the subway in February 2017, and a brass band rendition of Jerusalem plays in the background.

== Services ==
The station is served by three train operating companies:

Northern Trains:

- Hallam Line:
  - Three trains per hour to Leeds and to Sheffield
    - Two of these are express services that continue from Sheffield to Nottingham and Lincoln alternately
    - The third is a stopping service that in the Leeds direction runs via Castleford
  - On Sundays, the service to/from Lincoln do not run and the stopping services are reduced to two-hourly. There is one Sunday morning service on this route that continues to Carlisle, via Skipton and Settle.
- Pontefract Line:
  - One train per hour to Leeds and to Knottingley, via Pontefract Monkhill
  - There is a two-hourly service on Sundays. This provides a rail link to Wakefield Westgate.

TransPennine Express:

- One train per hour in each direction to York and to Manchester Piccadilly, via Huddersfield.

Grand Central:

- Four trains per day in each direction between Bradford Interchange and London King's Cross. London-bound trains travel via Doncaster and those to Bradford go via Mirfield and the Caldervale Line.

Preceding station	National Rail	Following station
Mirfield	TransPennine Express North TransPennine	Normanton
Mirfield	Northern Huddersfield Line	Normanton
Darton	Northern Hallam Line	Normanton
Wakefield Westgate	Northern Pontefract line	Streethouse
Leeds	Northern Leeds–Nottingham	Barnsley
Leeds	Northern Leeds–Lincoln	Barnsley
Pontefract Monkhill	Grand Central West Riding	Mirfield
Doncaster	Grand Central West Riding	Mirfield
	Disused railways	
Terminus	Lancashire and Yorkshire Railway; Dearne Valley Railway	Ryhill Halt; Line and station closed

=== Summer Specials ===
During the summer, excursion trains using heritage rolling stock run through the station: the Scarborough Spa Express on alternate Thursdays and The Dalesman to Carlisle, running over the Settle-Carlisle line on occasional Mondays and Tuesdays.

These services are hauled by diesel locomotives through West Yorkshire and changed to steam haulage part way along the routes, usually at Hellifield.

== See also ==
- Listed buildings in Wakefield
- Wakefield Westgate railway station
