= Public transport in South Yorkshire =

Public transport in South Yorkshire, England mainly consists of three modes: bus, tram and train. Passengers can switch between these modes of transport at various interchanges operated by the South Yorkshire Combined Mayoral Authority (under the passenger-facing brand Travel South Yorkshire).

== Ticketing ==
=== Single-operator tickets ===
On buses and trams, single and multi-trip tickets can be purchased on-board from the bus driver or tram conductor. These are usually only valid for travel with the same operator. Each operator also sells mobile tickets via their respective apps.

At the start of 2023, a £2 single fare cap was introduced on buses and trams as part of a nationwide scheme to combat the cost of living crisis. In November 2023 the tram fare cap was raised to £2.80, and on 1 January 2025, the bus fare cap was increased to £3 in line with the national fare cap scheme. Tram fares also increased again.

Since 1 January 2026, single tram fares have been capped at £3.

=== Multi-operator tickets ===
TravelMaster is an organisation operated by the major transport operators within South Yorkshire, and sells a range of multi-modal tickets valid either within Sheffield or the whole county. Tickets can typically be used across any operator in the valid area.

Most tickets require a smartcard to use, which can be purchased online, or alongside the ticket at some locations. Concessionary smartcards are available for young people, giving them discounts on most tickets.

1, 7 and 28-day tickets can be purchased online, on the TravelMaster app, at many bus interchanges and at Payzone outlets within South Yorkshire. 1-day and 7-day tickets can also be purchased on board trams and buses (with some restrictions when using contactless payments).

=== Concessions ===
Various concessionary travel schemes are available for young people and students, senior citizens and the mobility impaired.

==== Child fares and passes ====
There is a single reduced fare for children under 11 across all buses and trams. Children under 4 can travel for free.

Young people between 11 and 18 years old who live in South Yorkshire can get a free Zoom Under 16 or Zoom 16-18, which must be shown to travel at the child fare. There are also Zoom Zero passes which allow primary and secondary school students to travel to and from school for free - these can be purchased or funded by a local council if eligible.

Under 18s living in Barnsley can travel for free using the Barnsley MiCard. There are plans to roll this out county-wide in the future.

==== Zoom 18-21 pass ====
Young people between the ages of 18 and 22 who live in South Yorkshire (including students who live in Sheffield during term-time) can get a Zoom Beyond 18-21 travel pass, permitting the user to travel at reduced single fares on trams and some buses. Originally it allowed the holder to travel at the same single fare as under-18s. In 2023, reduced government funding led to the scheme nearly being scrapped. It was later announced that the scheme would continue, but in a weaker form - with fares nearly doubling.

==== Student fares ====
Most operators offer reduced fares to students if shown a valid student ID. However, the exact fares can vary between operators. This may include both single and multi-day tickets.

==== Disabled passes ====
Residents with some disabilities may be eligible for a free Disabled pass, which entitles them to free bus services within England and free tram services within South Yorkshire, along with free Northern train journeys between South Yorkshire and West Yorkshire. There is also the +Carer pass, which allows a carer to travel with the pass holder, and the Visually Impaired pass, which allows the holder to show the card to the driver instead of scanning it.

==== Senior pass ====
South Yorkshire residents who have reached state pension age are eligible for a free Senior pass, which entitles them to free bus services within England and free tram services within South Yorkshire during certain times of day. It also gives half-price tickets for Northern trains, and some free journeys to hospital appointments with some operators.

== Bus ==
=== Bus services ===
Since 1994, most bus routes in South Yorkshire have been operated by private companies. These include First, Stagecoach and TM Travel. There are some free "Sheffield Connect" bus services funded by SYMCA that operate in a loop though Sheffield city centre.

=== Bus interchanges ===
Travel South Yorkshire operate nine bus interchanges and several smaller stations, many of which have been newly built or refurbished in the early 2000s. These bus interchanges provide a hub for local, regional and sometimes national bus and coach services, and in some locations also provide an interchange facility onto tram and rail services.

Main interchanges
Name	Image	Location	Train station	Tram stop	Tram lines			
Name	Image	Location	Train station	Tram stop	Blue	Yellow	Purple	Tram Train
Adwick Interchange	Adwick Interchange building	Church Lane, Adwick le Street, Doncaster	Adwick	None				
Barnsley Interchange	Entrance to Barnsley Interchange	Eldon Street North, Barnsley	Barnsley	None				
Doncaster Interchange	Doncaster Station building	Frenchgate Shopping Centre, Doncaster	Doncaster	None				
Meadowhall Interchange	Picture of Meadowhall Interchange	Meadowhall Shopping Centre, Sheffield	Meadowhall	Meadowhall Interchange		✓		
Rotherham Interchange	An entrance into Rotherham Interchange	Frederick Street, Rotherham	Rotherham Central (200m)	Rotherham Central (200m)				✓
Sheffield Interchange	Entrance to Sheffield Interchange	Pond Square, Sheffield	Sheffield (200m)	Sheffield Station / Sheffield Hallam University (250m)	✓		✓	
Sheffield Interchange	Entrance to Sheffield Interchange	Pond Square, Sheffield	Sheffield (200m)	Castle Square (250m)	✓	✓	✓	✓

'Mini' interchanges:

- Arundel Gate Interchange ( Castle Square, 150m)
- Dinnington Interchange
- Hillsborough Interchange

Smaller stations:

- Crystal Peaks Bus Station
- Grimethorpe Interchange
- Manor Top Bus Stop
- Mexborough Interchange ( Mexborough, 300m)

== Tram ==
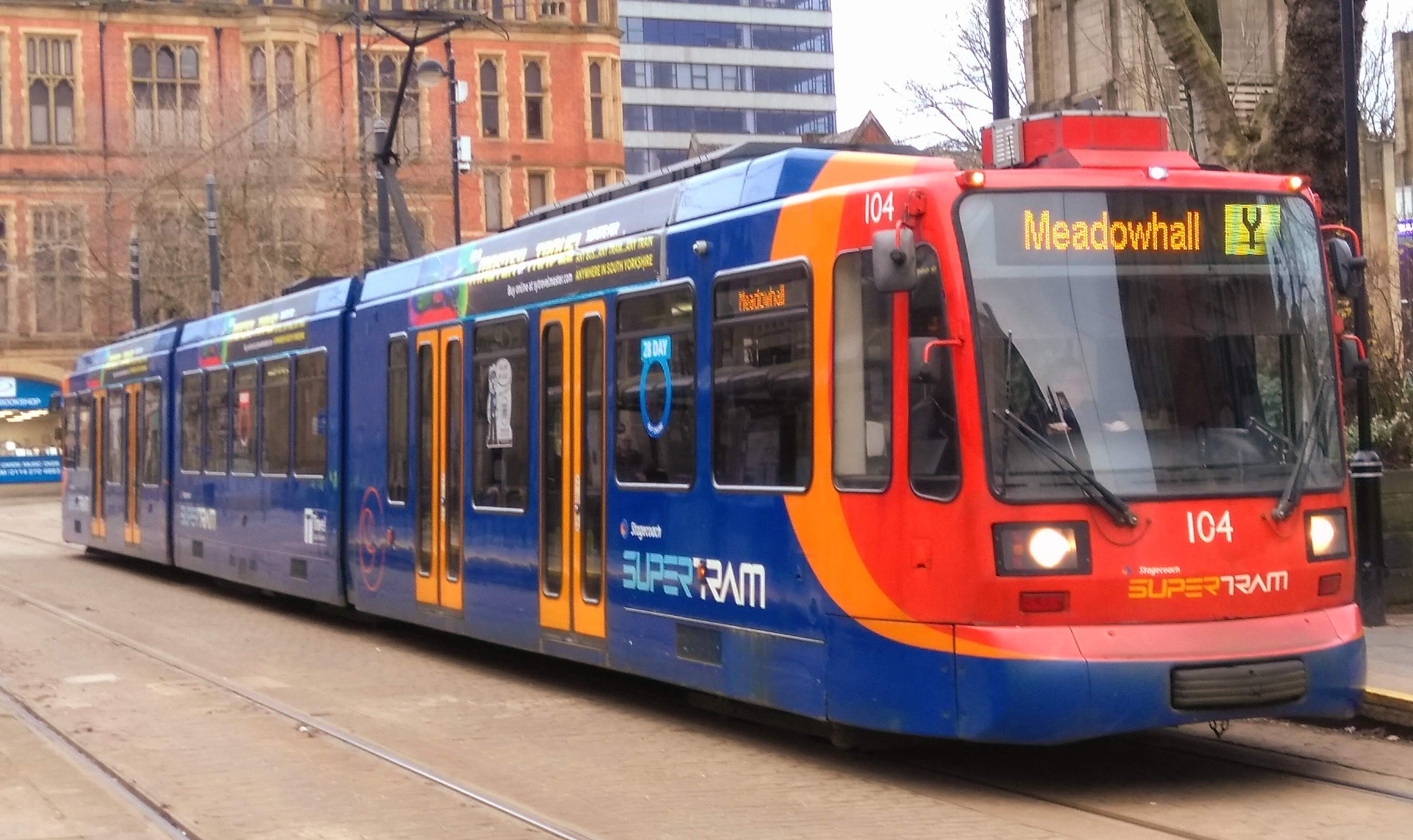
A tram at the Cathedral Tram Stop.

The South Yorkshire Supertram (Note: Between 1997 and 2024, the network was officially operated under the brand name Stagecoach Supertram. The network was colloquially referred to as the Sheffield Supertram during this time; after returning to public ownership in 2024, the original South Yorkshire Supertram name was re-adopted.) is a tram and tram-train network covering Sheffield and Rotherham in South Yorkshire, England. The network is owned and operated by the South Yorkshire Mayoral Combined Authority (SYMCA). (Note: The infrastructure and rolling stock of the Supertram network is directly owned by the South Yorkshire Mayoral Combined Authority. Day-to-day operation of the network is subcontracted to South Yorkshire Future Trams Limited (SYFTL), which is a wholly-owned arm's-length subsidiary of the SYMCA.)

Interest in building a modern tram system for Sheffield had mounted during the 1980s. After detailed planning by South Yorkshire Passenger Transport Executive (SYPTE), the Supertram proposal was approved by an act of Parliament, the South Yorkshire Light Rail Transit Act 1988 (c. xxvii). Construction of the network, incorporating several existing heavy rail sections as well as new track, was carried out in sections, allowing revenue services to start during 1994. Early operations, hindered by a complex ticketing system and the initially small coverage area, had disappointing ridership figures. In an effort to turn around the performance, operations were privatised to Stagecoach in 1997, at price of £1.15 million, who took over from South Yorkshire Supertram Limited. After management and operational changes, and further expansion of the system, ridership numbers rose considerably. In March 2024, the network returned to public ownership as the concession awarded to Stagecoach came to an end.

From 2008, interest had been expressed in hybrid tram-train operations, which would be able to use sections of the mainline rail network as well as tramways. During 2012 an experimental trial was planned, as this was to be the first deployment of tram-trains anywhere in the United Kingdom. The start of tram-train operations, using a purpose-built fleet of new Class 399 Vossloh Citylink electric multiple units, was repeatedly delayed, but on 25 October 2018, operations of the new tram-train line commenced.

The Supertram network now consists of 51 stations across four colour-coded lines, the Blue, Purple, Yellow and Tram-Train (Black) routes, which connect with local and national bus and rail services and seven park and ride sites.

== Rail ==
=== Stations ===
There are multiple railway stations in each of the four towns/cities of South Yorkshire. Regional services to destinations across the UK are available from Barnsley, Doncaster, Sheffield, and Meadowhall Interchange.

All stations with National Rail services are listed below (in no particular order):

Passenger rail stations in South Yorkshire
Barnsley	Doncaster	Rotherham	Sheffield
Barnsley; Penistone; Silkstone Common; Dodworth; Darton; Wombwell; Elsecar; Thurnscoe; Goldthorpe; Bolton-upon-Dearne	Doncaster; Adwick; Bentley; Hatfield & Stainforth; Kirk Sandall; Conisborough; Mexborough; Thorne North; Thorne South	Rotherham Central; Swinton; Kiveton Bridge; Kiveton Park	Sheffield; Meadowhall Interchange; Dore & Totley; Darnall; Woodhouse; Chapeltown

==== Opened and re-opened stations ====
Eleven new stations were opened by SYPTE between 1983 and 1993. Many of these were re-opened former stations previously closed in the 1960s under the Beeching cuts, but not all; Goldthorpe and Thurnscoe were entirely new stations, Rotherham Central was built to replace the closing Rotherham Masborough which was further away from Rotherham town centre, and Meadowhall Interchange was built to serve the new Meadowhall Shopping Centre. Parkgate, the terminus of the Sheffield Supertram tram-train pilot scheme from Sheffield city centre, opened in October 2018.

- 1983 – Silkstone Common
- 1984 – Chapeltown (station re-sited)
- 1987 – Rotherham Central
- 1988 – Goldthorpe; Thurnscoe
- 1989 – Dodworth
- 1990 – Meadowhall Interchange; Swinton
- 1991 – Kirk Sandall
- 1992 – Bentley
- 1993 – Adwick
- 2018 – Parkgate (tram-train stop)

=== Routes ===
Stations in italics are located outside of the South Yorkshire CMA area.

Hallam Line	Wakefield Line	Dearne Valley Line	Penistone Line	Sheffield–Leeds via Castleford Line
Operators: Northern Trains, East Midlands Railway: Leeds; Wakefield Kirkgate; Barnsley Interchange; Meadowhall Interchange; Sheffield; Dronfield; Chesterfield; Alfreton; Langley Mill; Ilkeston; Nottingham	Operators: Northern Trains, CrossCountry: Sheffield; Meadowhall Interchange; Rotherham Central; Swinton; Bolton-upon-Dearne; Goldthorpe; Thurnscoe; Moorthorpe ^{[A]}; Fitzwilliam; Sandal & Agbrigg; Wakefield Westgate; Outwood; Leeds	Operators: Northern Trains: Sheffield; Meadowhall Interchange; Rotherham Central; Swinton; Moorthorpe ^{[A]}; Pontefract Baghill; Sherburn-in-Elmet; Church Fenton; Ulleskelf; York	Operators: Northern Trains: Sheffield; Meadowhall Interchange; Chapeltown; Elsecar; Wombwell; Barnsley Interchange; Dodworth; Silkstone Common; Penistone; Denby Dale ^{[A]}; Shepley; Stocksmoor; Brockholes; Honley; Berry Brow; Lockwood; Huddersfield	Operators: Northern Trains: Sheffield; Meadowhall Interchange; Chapeltown; Elsecar; Wombwell; Barnsley Interchange; Darton; Wakefield Kirkgate; Normanton; Castleford; Woodlesford; Leeds

Hope Valley Line	Sheffield–Hull Line	Adwick–Lincoln Line	Doncaster–Leeds Line	Doncaster–Scunthorpe Line	Sheffield–Rotherham tram-train
Operators: Northern Trains, East Midlands Railway, TransPennine Express: Sheffield; Dore & Totley; Grindleford; Hathersage; Bamford; Hope; Edale; Chinley; New Mills Central; Marple; Romiley; Manchester Piccadilly	Operators: Northern Trains, CrossCountry, TransPennine Express: Sheffield; Meadowhall Interchange; Rotherham Central; Swinton; Mexborough; Conisbrough; Doncaster; Kirk Sandall; Hatfield & Stainforth; Thorne North; Goole; Saltmarshe; Gilberdyke; Brough; Ferriby; Hessle; Hull Paragon Interchange	Operators: Northern Trains, CrossCountry, TransPennine Express: Adwick; Bentley; Doncaster; Conisbrough; Mexborough; Swinton; Rotherham Central; Meadowhall Interchange; Sheffield; Darnall; Woodhouse; Kiveton Bridge; Kiveton Park; Shireoaks; Worksop; Retford; Gainsborough Lea Road; Saxilby; Lincoln	Operators: Northern Trains, Grand Central, London North Eastern Railway: Doncaster; Bentley; Adwick; South Elmsall ^{[A]}; Fitzwilliam; Sandal & Agbrigg; Wakefield Westgate; Outwood; Leeds	Operators: Northern Trains, TransPennine Express: Doncaster; Kirk Sandall; Hatfield & Stainforth; Thorne South; Crowle; Althorpe; Scunthorpe	Operators: Sheffield Supertram: Cathedral; Castle Square; Fitzalan Square Ponds Forge; Hyde Park; Cricket Inn Road; Nunnery Square Park & Ride; Woodbourn Road; Attercliffe; Arena for Olympic Legacy Park; Valley Centertainment; Carbrook for IKEA; Tinsley Meadowhall South; Magna; Rotherham Central; Parkgate

Notes:

^{A} – Station is located in West Yorkshire, but TSY multi-modal TravelMaster tickets are valid to and from these railway stations.

== Historical ==
=== Tramways ===
Before the Sheffield Supertram there used to tramway networks across each town in South Yorkshire. The Sheffield Tramway was the largest and the longest lasting, opening in 1873 and closing in 1960. Some of the trams used on the Sheffield Tramway are now at the National Tramway Museum.

=== Trolleybus ===
In 1985, the SYPTE purchased an Alexander RH bodied Dennis Dominator trolleybus with a view to reintroducing a trolleybus network. A one mile section on Sandall Beat Road alongside Doncaster Racecourse was wired. However with deregulation in 1986, the project was shelved.
