= Ackworth railway station =

Disused railway station in Ackworth, West Yorkshire

Ackworth
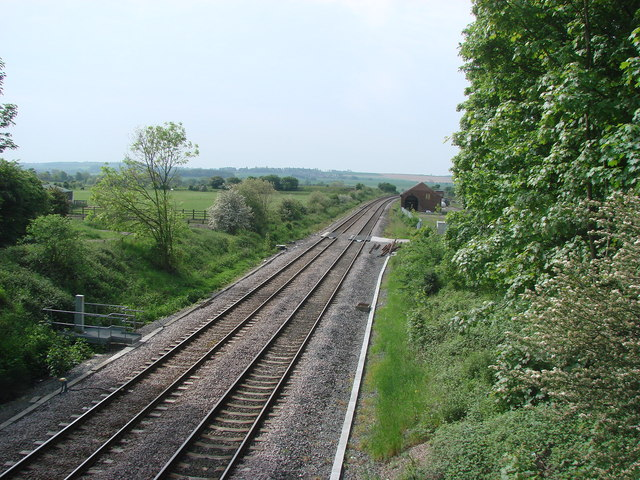

General information
- Location: Ackworth, City of Wakefield; England
- Coordinates: 53.65458°N 1.31347°W
- Grid reference: SE454177
- Platforms: 2

Other information
- Status: Disused

History
- Original company: Swinton and Knottingley Joint Railway
- Pre-grouping: Swinton and Knottingley Joint Railway
- Post-grouping: Swinton and Knottingley Joint Railway

Key dates
- 1 July 1879: Station opens
- 2 July 1951: Station closes in effect
- After 21 July 1959: Station closes officially
Location

Ackworth railway station was a railway station serving Ackworth in the English county of West Yorkshire.

== History ==
The station was opened in 1879 by the Swinton and Knottingley Joint Railway, which became a joint railway between the London, Midland and Scottish Railway and the London and North Eastern Railway during the Grouping of 1923. The station then passed on to the Eastern Region of British Railways on nationalisation in 1948.

The station was closed by British Railways to passengers in July 1951, but official closure was not completed until 21 July 1959.

== Site today ==
Trains pass on the Dearne Valley line, but there is no longer a station at Ackworth.

== Service ==
| Preceding station | Historical railways | Following station |
|---|---|---|
| Moorthorpe and South Kirkby | LM&S / LNER; Joint Line | Pontefract Baghill |
