= Goldthorpe railway station =

Railway station in South Yorkshire, England

Goldthorpe
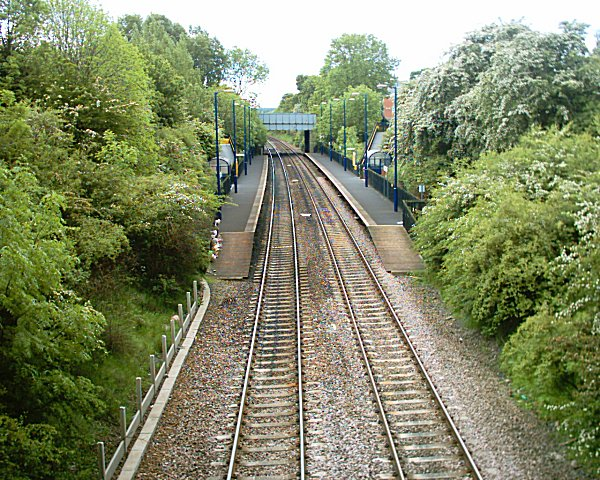

General information
- Location: Goldthorpe, Barnsley; England
- Coordinates: 53.533620°N 1.313040°W
- Grid reference: SE456043
- Managed by: Northern Trains
- Transit authority: Travel South Yorkshire
- Platforms: 2

Other information
- Station code: GOE
- Fare zone: Barnsley
- Classification: DfT category F2

Key dates
- 16 May 1988: Opened

Passengers
- 2020/21: ▼14,996
- 2021/22: ▲52,778
- 2022/23: ▲55,038
- 2023/24: ▲62,246
- 2024/25: ▲72,756
Location
Notes
- Passenger statistics from the Office of Rail and Road

Goldthorpe railway station serves the village of Goldthorpe, in South Yorkshire, England. It lies on the Wakefield Line 14 1/4 miles (23 km) north of Sheffield railway station. It was opened in May 1988.

Although it passed through the three settlements of Goldthorpe, neighbouring Thurnscoe and Bolton upon Dearne, the Swinton & Knottingley Joint Railway only provided one station for the area, at Bolton; both the other settlements were served by stations on other lines. Until 1961 this station was called Bolton on Dearne for Goldthorpe and was served by Sheffield-York stopping services.

By the late 1980s the low demand for York-bound passengers meant that only a handful of stopping trains used the line. South Yorkshire Passenger Transport Executive, responding to increasing demand for Sheffield-Leeds passengers in the area, and a lack of capacity on the Sheffield-Barnsley-Leeds line, sponsored an hourly service via Bolton to Wakefield Westgate & Leeds, and opened new stations at Goldthorpe and Thurnscoe.

== Facilities ==
The layout here is very similar to neighbouring Thurnscoe (and other stations opened on the same route, e.g. Sandal and Agbrigg and Outwood), namely two wooden platforms with basic shelters on each side. The station is unstaffed and has a ticket machine, so tickets can be purchased at the station or on the train. Digital display screens and timetable posters provide train running information. Step-free access is available to both platforms via ramps from the nearby road.

== Services ==
Monday to Saturday, there is an hourly service to Rotherham Central and Sheffield southbound and Leeds northbound. A similar frequency operates on Sundays, though starting later in the morning. One service on the Dearne Valley line to York also calls on weekday and Saturday mornings in the northbound direction only.

Preceding station	National Rail	Following station
Bolton-upon-Dearne	Northern Trains Wakefield Line	Thurnscoe
