= Thurnscoe railway station =

Railway station in South Yorkshire, England

Thurnscoe
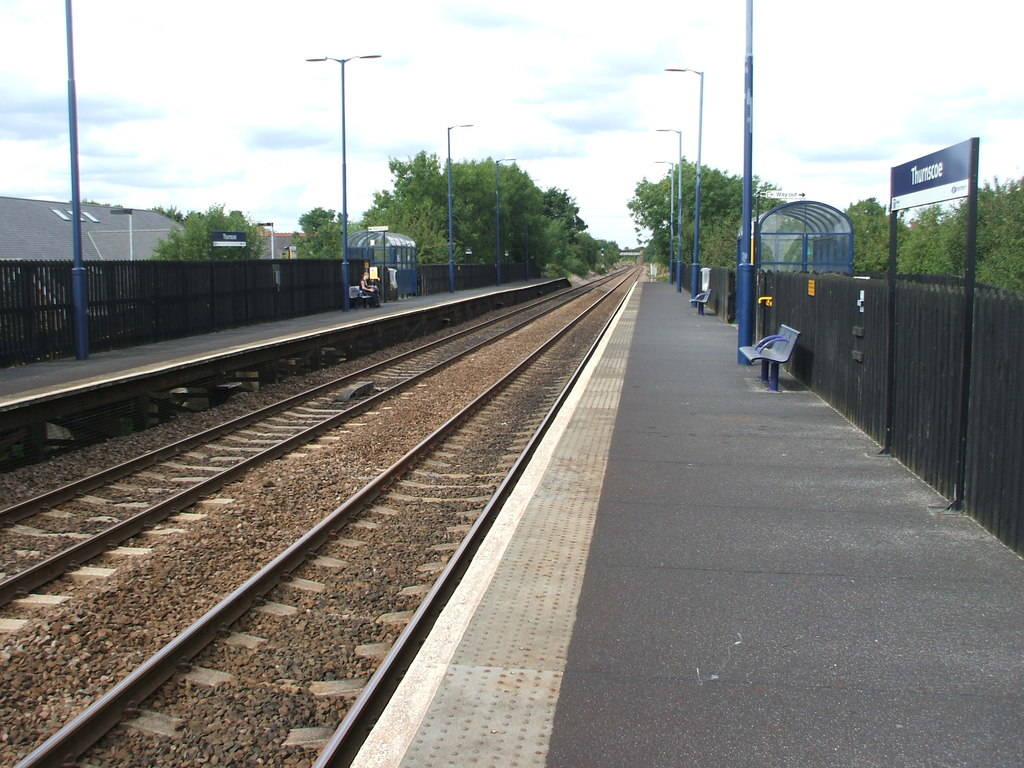

General information
- Location: Thurnscoe, Barnsley; England
- Coordinates: 53.545470°N 1.308470°W
- Grid reference: SE459056
- Managed by: Northern Trains
- Transit authority: Travel South Yorkshire
- Platforms: 2

Other information
- Station code: THC
- Fare zone: Barnsley
- Classification: DfT category F2

History
- Original company: British Rail

Key dates
- 16 May 1988: Station opened

Passengers
- 2020/21: ▼17,592
- 2021/22: ▲62,150
- 2022/23: ▲68,272
- 2023/24: ▲79,662
- 2024/25: ▲82,394
Location
Notes
- Passenger statistics from the Office of Rail and Road

Thurnscoe railway station serves a village of Thurnscoe in South Yorkshire, England. It is located on the Wakefield Line 15 miles (24 km) north of Sheffield railway station. Only stopping services call at the station. It was opened as a new station on 16 May 1988. The station was built by British Rail.

Although the line passed through the three settlements of Thurnscoe, neighbouring Goldthorpe and Bolton-on-Dearne, the Swinton & Knottingley Joint railway originally provided only two stations for the area, at Bolton-on-Dearne and at Frickley. Until 1961 the station was called Bolton on Dearne for Goldthorpe and was served by Sheffield-York stopping services. By the late 1980s the low demand for York-bound passengers meant that only a handful of stopping trains used the line. South Yorkshire Passenger Transport Executive, responding to increasing demand for Sheffield-Leeds passengers in the area, and a lack of capacity on the Sheffield-Barnsley-Leeds line, sponsored an hourly service via Bolton and opened new stations at Goldthorpe and Thurnscoe.

== Facilities ==
The two wooden platforms each have a shelter and passenger information notice boards. It is not staffed and has a single ticket machine on the north-bound platform, meaning passengers are expected to purchase their tickets, then traverse two long ramps and the railway bridge if they wish to travel southbound. Though there is step-free access from the car park onto the platforms, Northern's station information page states that it is unsuitable for use by disabled passengers. The cycle racks are also somewhat secluded and have low security.

== Services ==
From Monday to Saturday, there is an hourly service to Sheffield southbound and to Leeds via Wakefield Westgate northbound. One additional service also calls here en route to Pontefract Baghill and York northbound only in the morning peak.

On Sunday, there is also an hourly service in each direction, though starting later in the morning.

Preceding station	National Rail	Following station
Goldthorpe	Northern Trains Wakefield Line	Moorthorpe
