= Ninety–Nine Arches Viaduct =

Railway viaduct in West Yorkshire, England

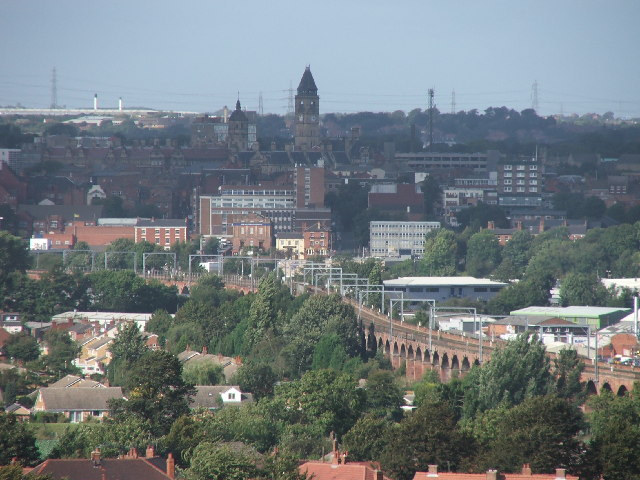
- Coordinates: 53.6743°N 1.4970°W
- OS grid reference: SE333197
- Carries: Wakefield line
- Begins: Wakefield Westgate railway station
- Ends: Sandal & Agbrigg railway station
- Other name: Wakefield Viaduct (Note: A viaduct immediately west of Wakefield Kirkgate railway station is also known as Wakefield Viaduct. This was built in the 1830s and consists of twelve arches, eleven of which are 30 feet (9.1 m) and one arch over Kirkgate Street which is 20 feet (6.1 m).)
- Named for: The assumed number of arches

Characteristics
- Total length: 1 mile 7 chains (1.8 km)

Rail characteristics
- No. of tracks: 2
- Track gauge: 1,435 mm (4 ft 8 1/2 in) standard gauge
- Electrified: Overhead catenary (1988)

History
- Opened: February 1866

Location
- Interactive map of Ninety–Nine Arches Viaduct

Ninety–Nine Arches Viaduct (also known simply as Wakefield Viaduct), is a long (1-mile-7-chain (1.8 km)) railway viaduct carrying the Wakefield line across part of the city of Wakefield in West Yorkshire, England. The viaduct is known as Ninety–Nine Arches Viaduct due to the number of arches it has, although some doubts have been cast on this as it has been recorded that the actual number of arches is 111. The viaduct also curves across the city as can be seen in the accompanying imagery, and has been called one of the most impressive viaducts in Britain.

== History ==
The viaduct was opened as part of the West Riding and Grimsby Railway (WR&GR) on 1 February 1866. (Note: Bairstow states the line opened on 18 February 1866, but two newspaper reports from the time state that it was opened on 2 February 1866 "without any public ceremony".) The WR&GR line ran from Wakefield Westgate station to Doncaster (with a branch to Stainforth on the Doncaster to Scunthorpe line) and this later became the main route for trains from London King's Cross to Leeds operated by the Great Northern Railway, (Note: The Great Northern Railway assumed control of the WR&GR line on 1 February 1866, and this transfer was authorised by an Act of Parliament (West Riding and Grimsby Railway (Transfer) Act 1866 (29 & 30 Vict. c. clxii))) as it saved 20 minutes journey time on the old route to Leeds via Knottingley. Initially the viaduct had a delay in opening, as the inspector of railways noted a "give" in the bridge section over the River Calder when a train passed over it. The railway company soon remedied this, allowing the line to open.

Largely known locally as Ninety-Nine Arches Viaduct due to the supposed number of arches, the viaduct was the subject of an unofficial study which determined that the structure had 111 arches, (Note: Some have stated the viaduct has only 95, or 99 arches; hence the name.) though some arches have been replaced with 20th century steel beam bridge sections. Local artist Tony Wade, walked alongside the viaduct and sketched all the arches and replaced bridge sections. The owners and maintainers of the viaduct, Network Rail, in their coordinates and bridge height data spreadsheet refer to the structure as Wakefield Viaduct. The viaduct also has a pronounced curve in the structure as it wends its way across Wakefield City.

The bridge starts almost immediately after the south end of Wakefield Westgate railway station crossing Ings Road, then a spur line leaves to go towards Wakefield Kirkgate railway station. Thereafter the line crosses Denby Dale Road, the railway to and from Wakefield Kirkgate from Barnsley and Mirfield (originally the Lancashire and Yorkshire Railway line from Normanton to Manchester), Thornes Lane, and the River Calder, ending some 27 chains (1,800 ft; 540 m) short of Sandal & Agbrigg railway station. Whilst the section over the River Calder has been replaced, its original span was 163 feet (50 m). Trackmaps list the viaduct as extending for 1 mile 7 chains (1.8 km), other measurements state 1,300 yards (1,200 m). The structure is largely made from bricks, of which it has been suggested that over 800 million were used in its construction.

It was electrified in 1988 as part of the whole electrification of the East Coast Main Line. Whilst not as notable as some other viaducts in the area, the Wakefield Viaduct has been called "..one of the country’s most impressive railway viaducts.."
