= Wakefield line =

Railway from Leeds to Sheffield

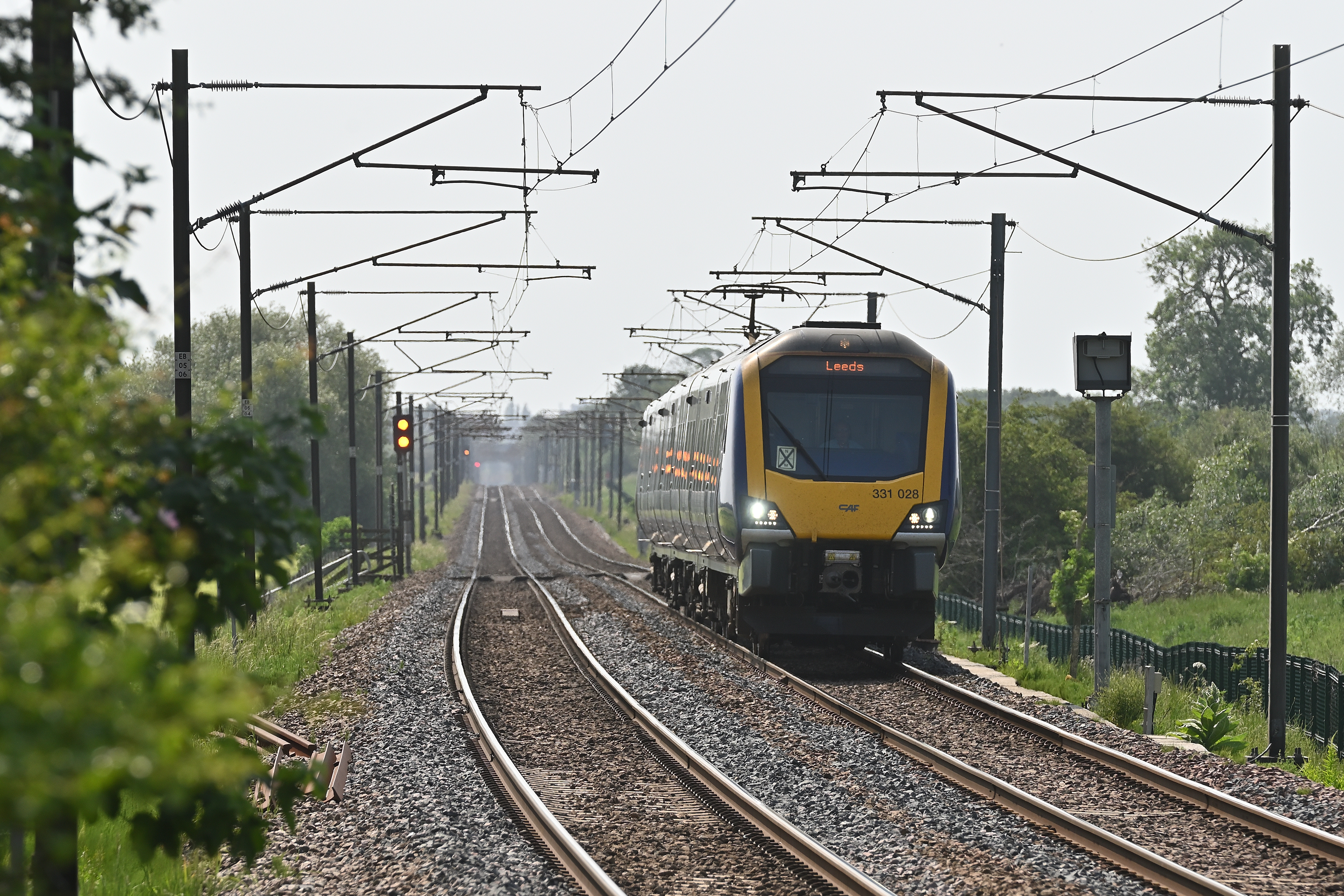
- A Northern electric service from Leeds to Doncaster at Adwick

Overview
- Owner: Network Rail
- Locale: West Yorkshire; South Yorkshire
- Termini: Leeds; Sheffield

Technical
- Track gauge: 4 ft 8 1/2 in (1,435 mm) standard gauge
Route map
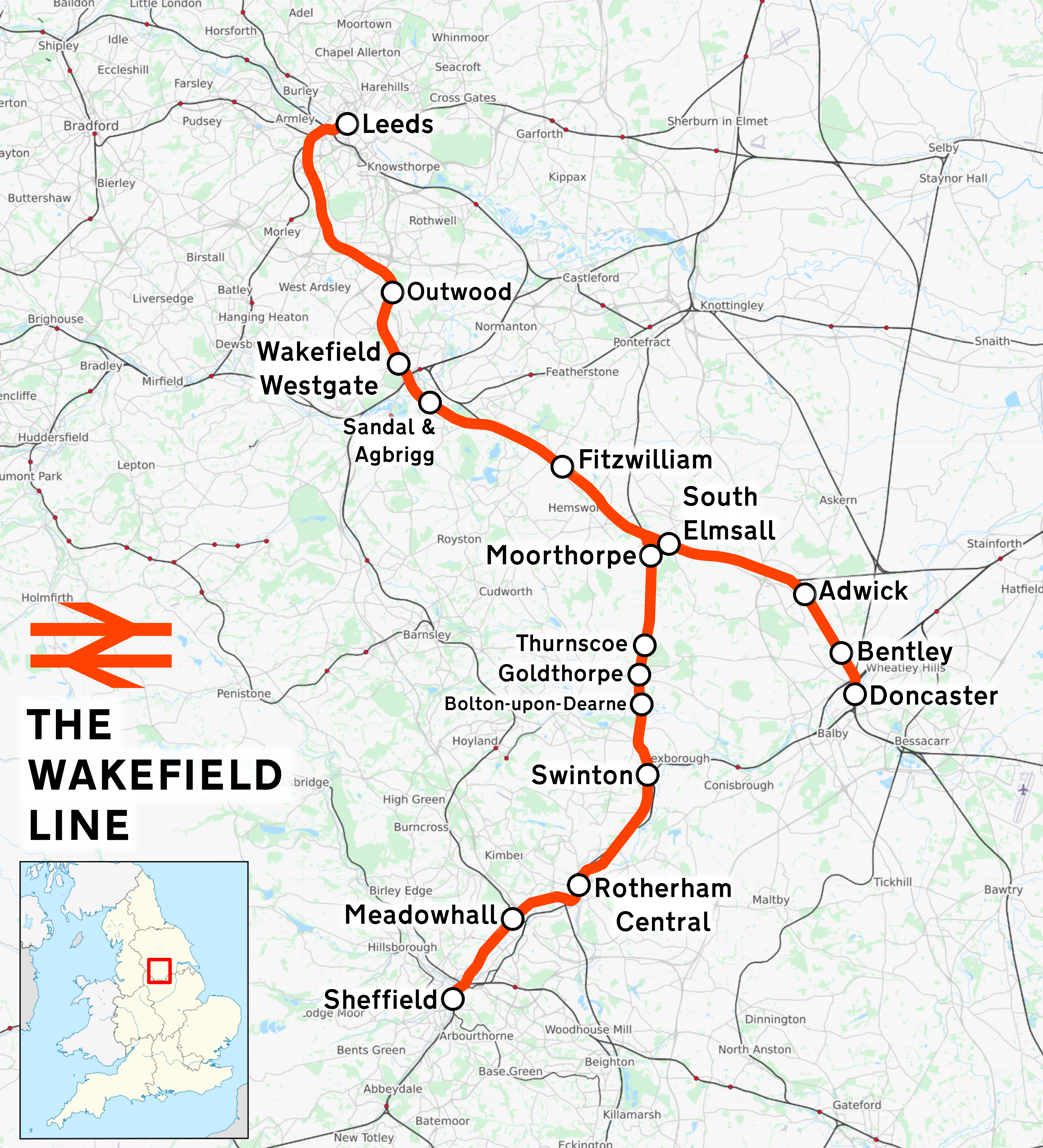
(Click to expand)

The Wakefield line is a railway line and service in the West Yorkshire Metro and South Yorkshire Passenger Transport Executive areas of northern England. The Wakefield line is coloured yellow on maps and publications by West Yorkshire Metro. The line was electrified in 1989, between Leeds and Wakefield Westgate, as part of the programme to electrify the East Coast Main Line.

The service connects Leeds and Wakefield with Sheffield and Doncaster with the section of the line between Leeds and Doncaster forming part of the East Coast Main Line. The local stopping service is operated by Northern with services between Leeds, Wakefield and either Doncaster or Sheffield. Inter-city operators are London North Eastern Railway, East Midlands Railway and CrossCountry who provide services from Leeds to London and the South of England.

Some sections of the line are shared with the Huddersfield (orange) and Pontefract lines (light blue).

West Yorkshire "Metrocards" are available for all trains as far as South Elmsall on the Doncaster section of the line and to Moorthorpe on the Sheffield section.

== Pre-nationalisation ownership ==
At the time of the 1923 Grouping the line was owned by different railway companies:

- Leeds Central–Wakefield

Great Northern Railway (GNR) – with Wakefield Westgate station being jointly owned by the GNR and Great Central Railways (GCR).

- Wakefield–Doncaster

West Riding and Grimsby Joint Railway (WRGJt) itself being of joint Great Northern Railway and Great Central Railway ownership.

- Moorthorpe–Swinton

Swinton & Knottingley Joint Railway itself being of joint Midland Railway (MidR) and North Eastern Railway (NER) ownership.

- Swinton–Sheffield

Midland Railway (MidR)

== The route ==
Trains on the line serve the following places; however, some stations have closed:

=== Leeds City–Fitzwilliam ===
- Beeston (closed)

Ardsley Tunnel

- Ardsley (closed)
- Outwood (formerly known as Lofthouse and Outwood)

At Outwood there were junctions with two joint undertakings; East & West Yorkshire Union (a short line connecting the Great Northern / Midland Railway main lines via Rothwell and Methley Joint Railway (owners being Great Northern, Lancashire and Yorkshire Railway and North Eastern Railway) connecting to various lines in the Castleford area.

Wrenthorpe Junction

From this junction was a line to Dewsbury which was partially closed in 1963 and complete closure came in 1965 – some artefacts still remain to this day.

- Wakefield Westgate

Ninety–Nine Arches Viaduct

- Sandal and Agbrigg (originally 'Sandal', closed 1957; reopened 1987 by British Rail with new name)
- Hare Park & Crofton (closed)

Nostell North & South Junctions with Great Central Railway

- Nostell (closed)
- Fitzwilliam (replaced an earlier station of the same name a short distance away)
- Hemsworth (closed)

Junction with the Hull and Barnsley Railway (HBR)

Junction with Sheffield branch to the south

=== Fitzwilliam–Doncaster ===
- South Elmsall
- Hampole (closed)
- Adwick (originally 'Carcroft & Adwick-le-Street' station, closed 1967; reopened by British Rail a short distance away with new name in 1993)
- Bentley
- Doncaster

=== Fitzwilliam–Swinton ===
Part of this section is also worked as the Dearne Valley line:

- Moorthorpe
- Frickley (closed)

Branch line to Frickley Colliery

- Thurnscoe

Hickleton Junction for the Dearne Valley Railway (worked by the Lancashire & Yorkshire Railway)

- Goldthorpe
- Bolton-on-Dearne

Junction with the Great Central Railway Penistone–Doncaster line.

- Swinton

=== Swinton–Sheffield ===
From Swinton towards Sheffield, the Midland Railway and Great Central had parallel lines following the course of the River Don. The lines of the competing companies were so close that in 1965 British Railways built a new junction complex at Aldwarke and the current Wakefield Line now follows the former Great Central line to reach the reopened Rotherham Central. Intermediate stations were to be found at:

- Parkgate and Aldwarke (closed)
- Rotherham Road (closed)
- Rotherham Central

Taking a new curve, the line joins the Sheffield and Rotherham Railway.

- Meadowhall(opened 1990; replaced Wincobank which closed in 1956 which was on same site)
- Brightside (closed)

Grimesthorpe Junction the line leaves the Sheffield & Rotherham and takes the Midland Railway line built in 1870.

- Attercliffe Road (closed)
- Sheffield

Route maps of the route 1910–1913

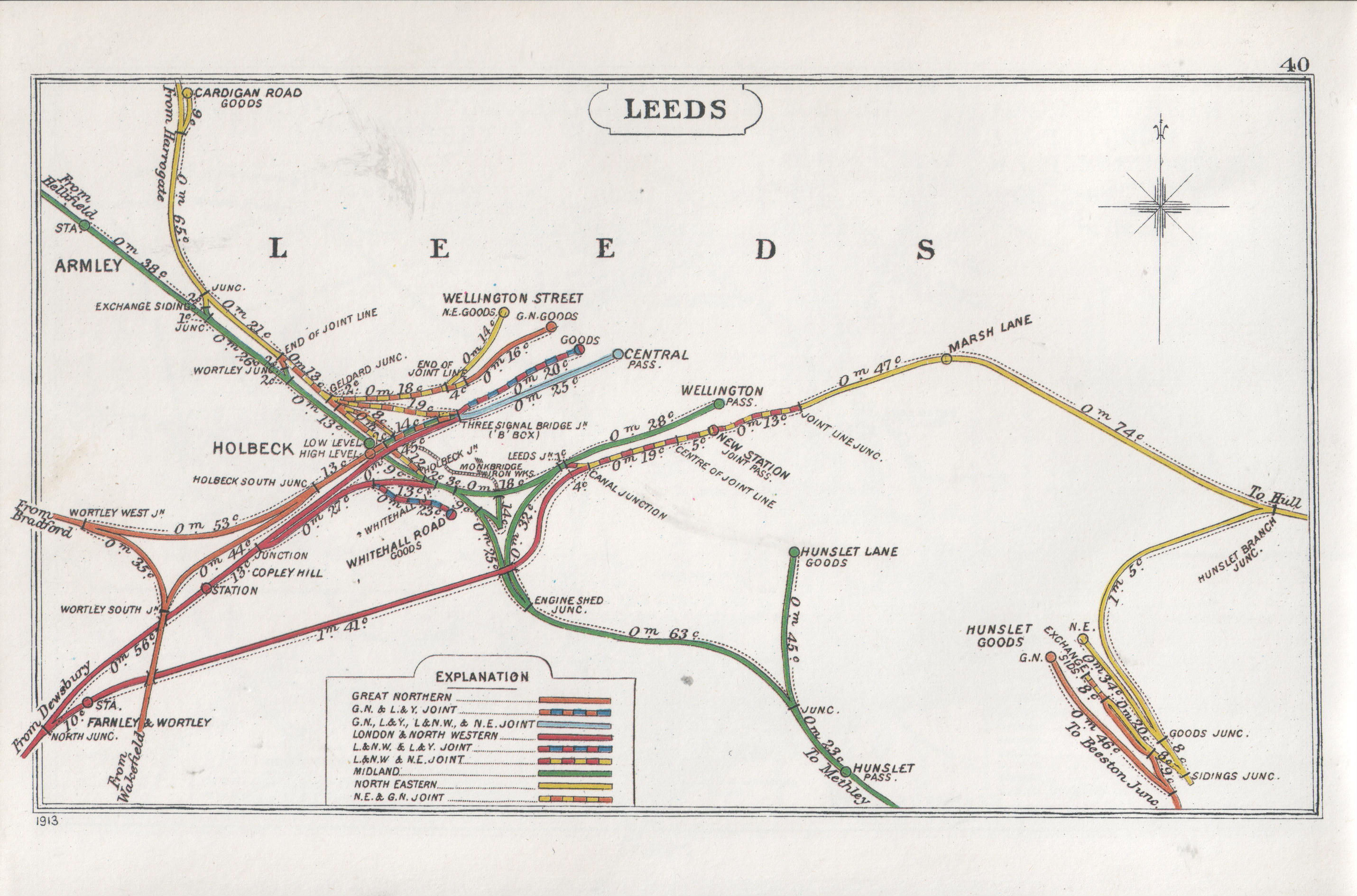
Railway lines in Leeds in 1913

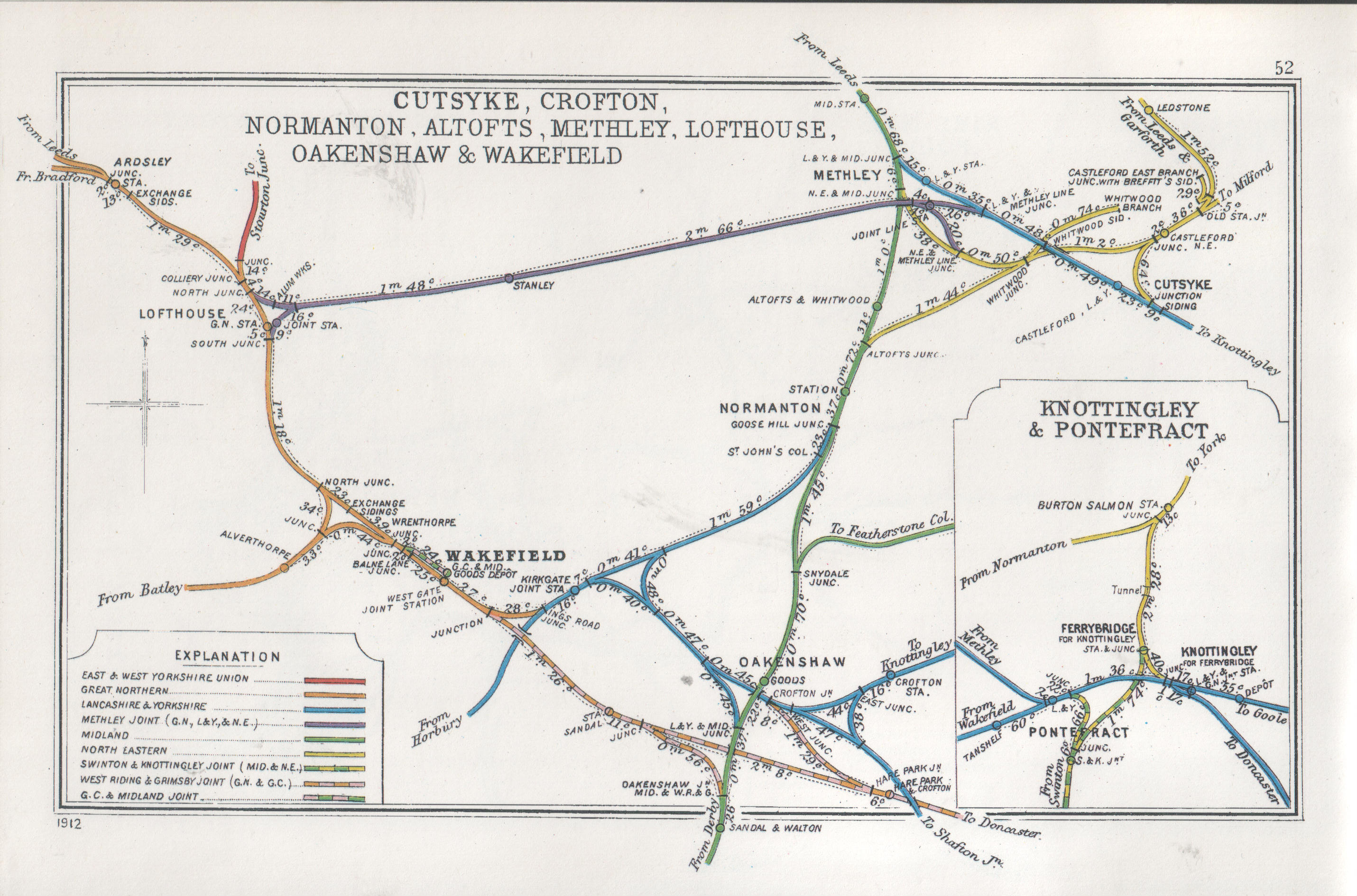
The route via Ardsley and Lofthouse through Wakefield in 1912

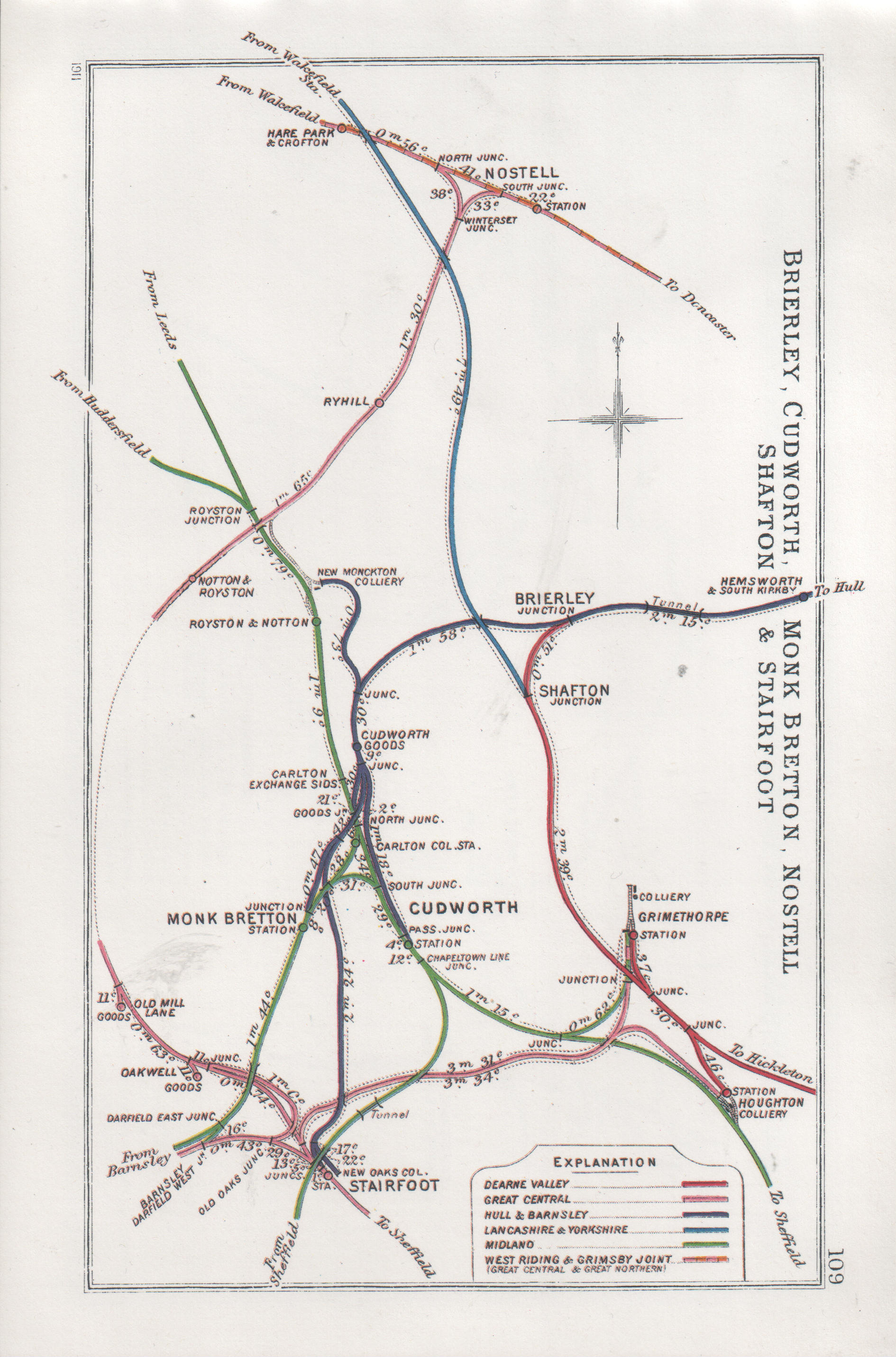
Railway lines around Nostell in 1911

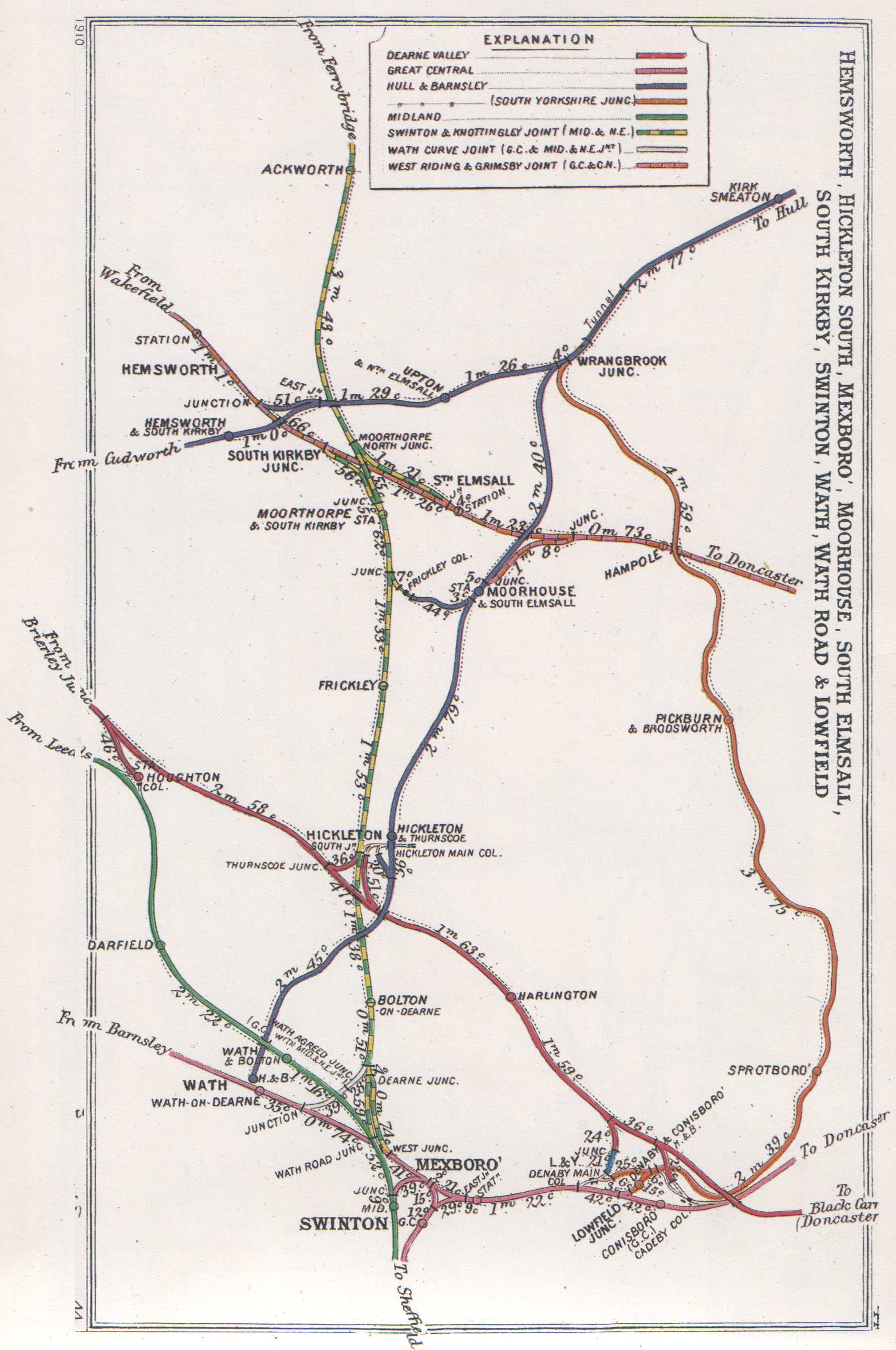
Railway lines around Hemsworth and South Emsall; Moorthorpe, Hickleton, Bolton-upon-Dearne, and Swinton in 1910

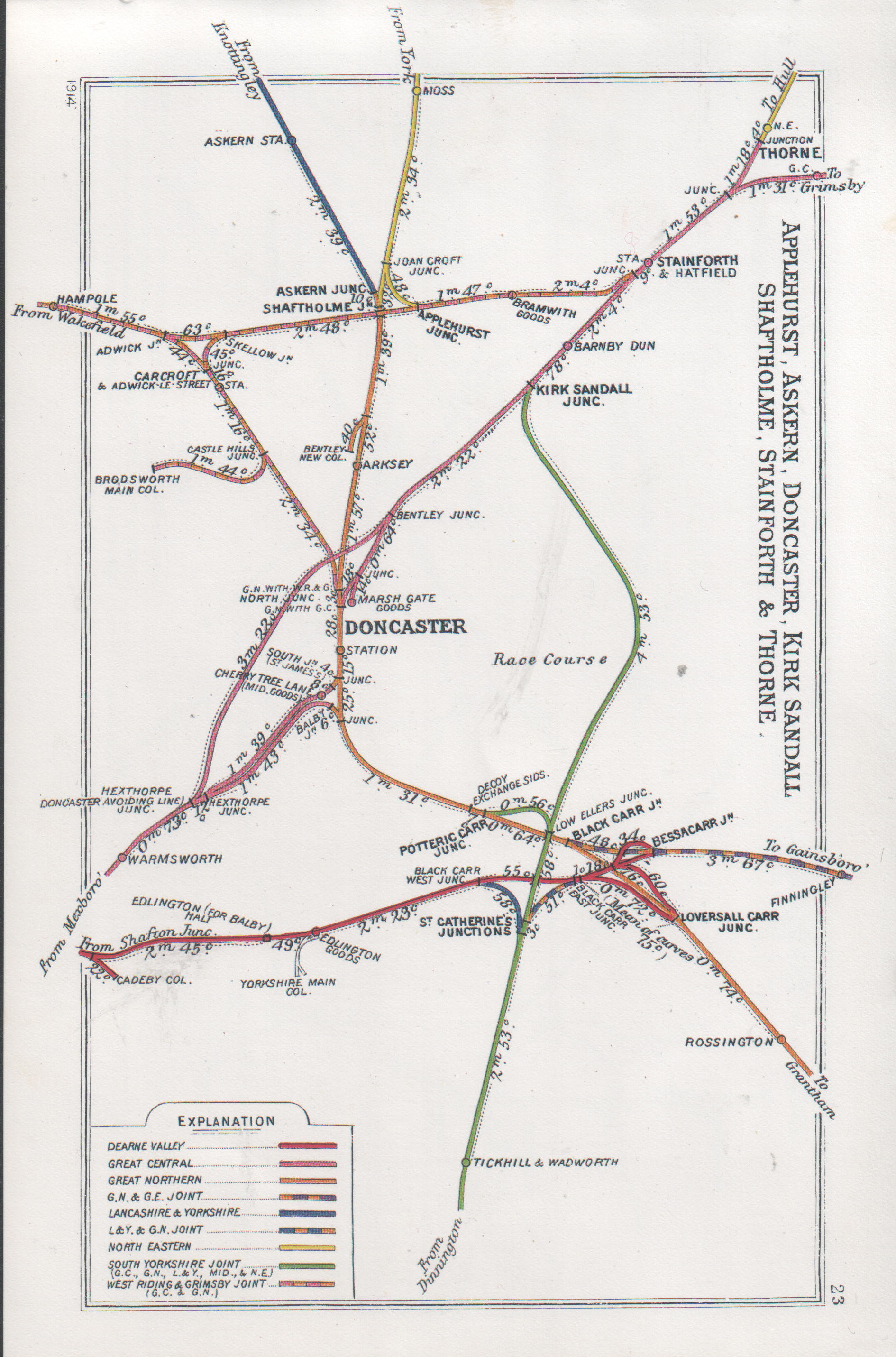
Railway lines around Doncaster in 1914

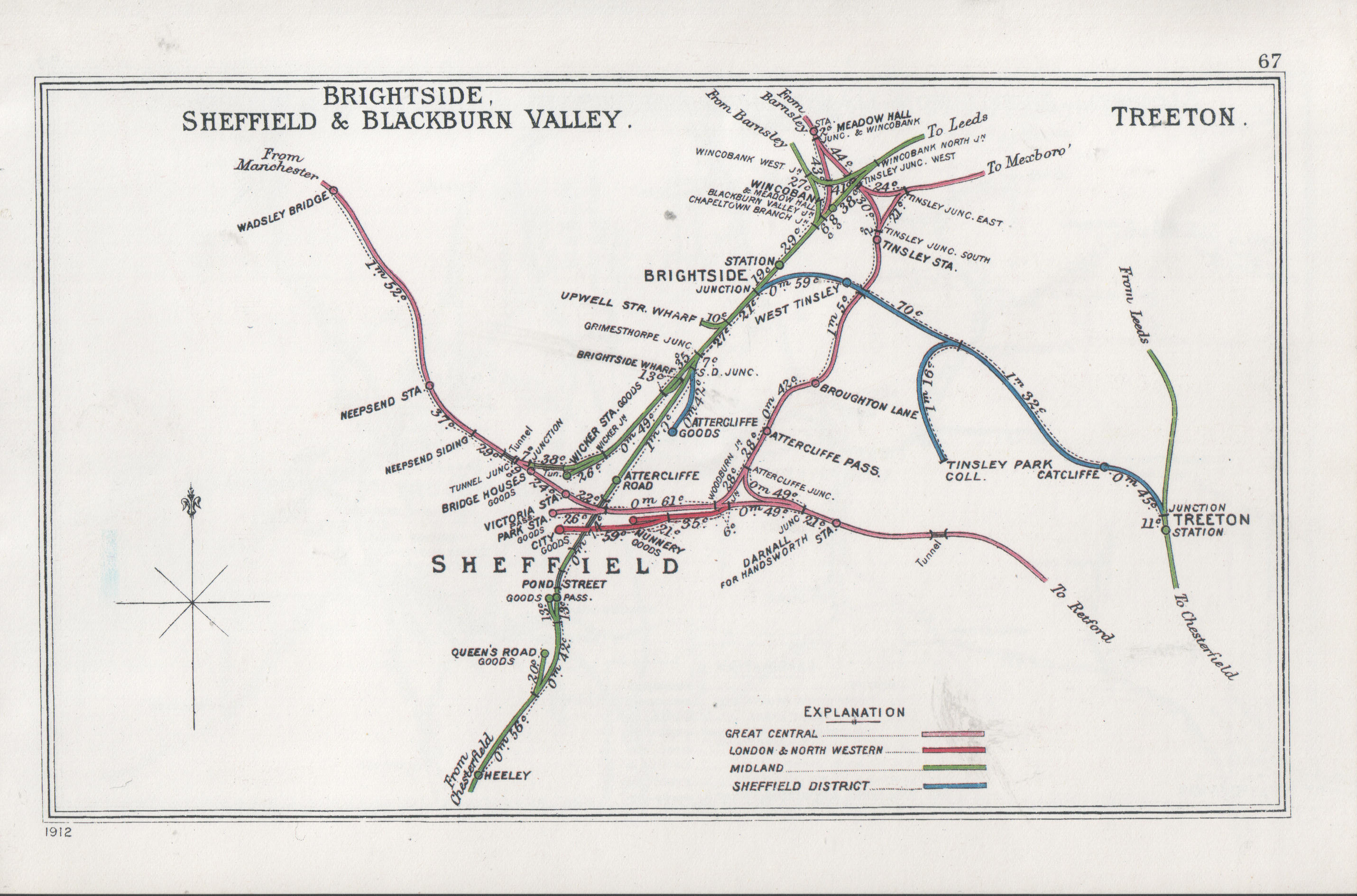
Railway lines in Sheffield in 1912

== See also ==
- Metro (West Yorkshire PTE)
- Travel South Yorkshire (South Yorkshire PTE)
