= Frickley railway station =

Former railway station in England

Frickley
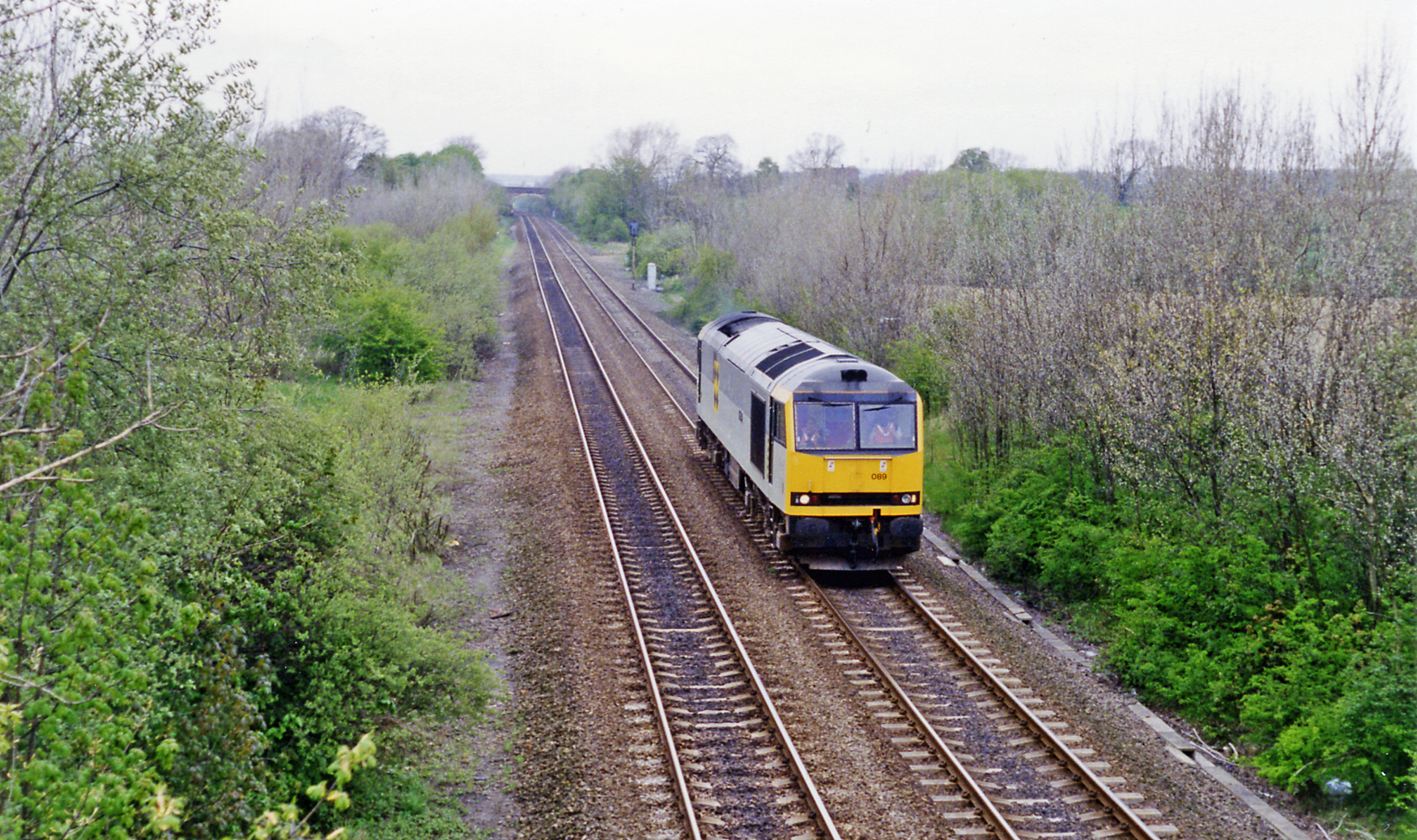
- Site of the station (1995)

General information
- Location: Clayton, Barnsley; England
- Coordinates: 53.563890°N 1.304170°W
- Grid reference: SE461077
- Platforms: 2

Other information
- Status: Disused

Key dates
- 1879: opened
- 1953: closed
Location

Frickley railway station was situated on the Swinton and Knottingley Joint railway, between Bolton-on-Dearne and Moorthorpe. It served the village of Clayton, South Yorkshire, England.

The station was situated about 1 mile (1.6 km) north of the present Thurnscoe railway station.

It opened in 1879 and closed on 8 June 1953.
