= Moorthorpe railway station =

Railway station in West Yorkshire, England

Moorthorpe
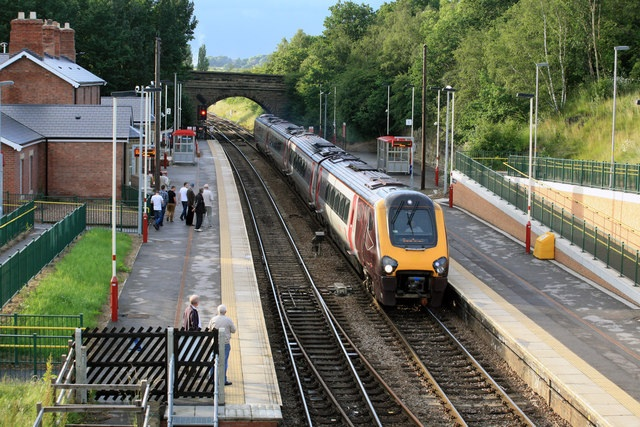
- The restored Moorthorpe railway station

General information
- Location: Moorthorpe and South Kirkby, City of Wakefield; England
- Coordinates: 53.5949°N 1.3050°W
- Grid reference: SE460111
- Manager: Northern Trains
- Transit authority: West Yorkshire (Metro)
- Platforms: 2

Other information
- Station code: MRP
- Fare zone: 5(WYPTE)& Barnsley(SYPTE)
- Classification: DfT category F1

Key dates
- May 1879: Opened

Passengers
- 2020/21: ▼73,596
- 2021/22: ▲0.174 million
- 2022/23: ▼0.160 million
- 2023/24: ▲0.181 million
- 2024/25: ▲0.208 million
Location
Notes
- Passenger statistics from the Office of Rail and Road

Moorthorpe railway station serves the village of Moorthorpe and town of South Kirkby in West Yorkshire, England. It lies on the Wakefield Line and the Dearne Valley Line, 18 1/4 miles (29.4 km) north of Sheffield and is served by Northern Trains.

The station was opened in May 1879, jointly by the Midland Railway and North Eastern Railway, as part of their Swinton and Knottingley Joint Railway scheme. A short chord was also built at the same time to link the S&K Joint line with the main Doncaster to Leeds line at South Kirkby Junction. Upon opening, Moorthorpe marked the northern limit of the part of the line maintained by the Midland Railway; the southern end of the intersection bridge over the Doncaster to Leeds line, marked the actual boundary. North of that point, the North Eastern Railway undertook the maintenance. Moorthorpe station is of North Eastern Railway design, as is Pontefract Baghill.

This latter connection is now part of the main line between Sheffield and Leeds, and is used by CrossCountry services between Edinburgh Waverley and Birmingham New Street, and beyond. In addition, local trains on the Leeds – Rotherham Central – Sheffield route (Wakefield Line) use the spur and call at the station. This connecting line is now effectively the main line, and it splits from the S & K route immediately north of the station, with the track to York then bridging the GNR main line on its way northwards. This junction (and the adjacent loops to the south of the station) was controlled from the nearby Midland Railway signal box until May 2011, but following signalling equipment renewal work the area is now under the control of the ROC at York.

After the station was reduced to the status of an unstaffed halt in the 1980s, the station building was converted into a pub. This closed in the early 1990s and the building became derelict. However it has recently been restored by the town council, with funding from the Railway Heritage Trust, to include office space and a cafe.

A footbridge was opened at the station at the end of May 2010; previously passengers had to cross the tracks at a flat crossing.

== Services ==
Monday to Saturday, an hourly service operates from Moorthorpe to Leeds via Wakefield Westgate and to Sheffield. An hourly service also runs on Sundays.

Three trains each way operate on the Dearne Valley line to York and Sheffield on Mondays to Saturdays only. There are no Sunday trains on this route, but one return trip to York is operated by a rail-replacement bus in the late afternoon.

The station is less than 1 mile (1.6 km) away from South Elmsall railway station, which means the South Kirkby/South Elmsall area has a half-hourly service to Leeds.

The station is less than 1 mile (1.6 km) away from Frickley Athletic F.C.

Preceding station	National Rail	Following station
Swinton	Northern Trains Dearne Valley Line	Pontefract Baghill
Thurnscoe	Northern Trains Wakefield Line	Fitzwilliam
Historical railways
Frickley	Midland Railway Cross Country Route	Hemsworth

== Tickets ==
The station is in West Yorkshire but South Yorkshire PTE tickets are valid to and from this station on services into South Yorkshire.
