= Swinton and Knottingley Joint Railway =

Railway line in West and South Yorkshire, England

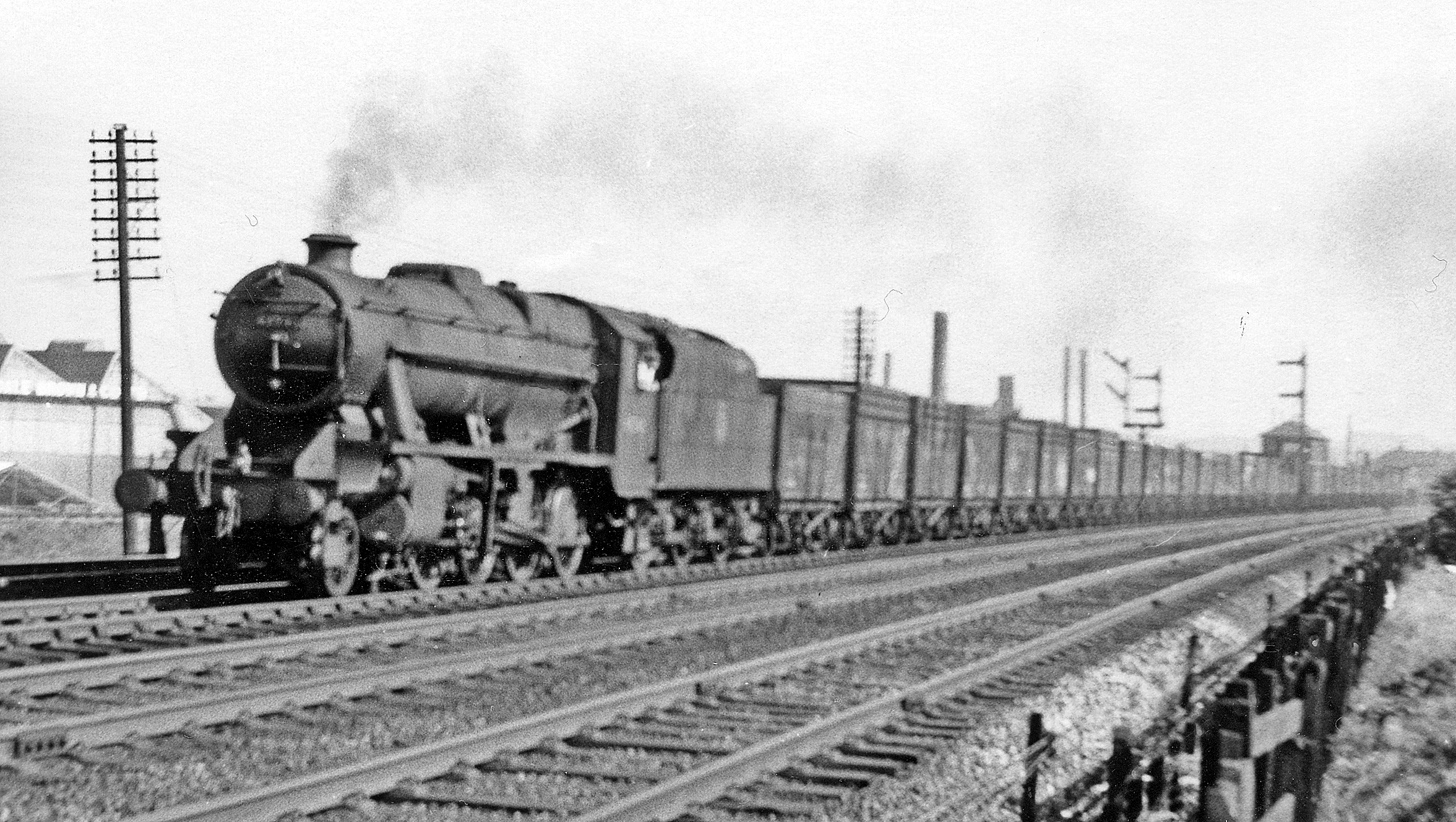
Train on the Swinton and Knottingley main line in 1957

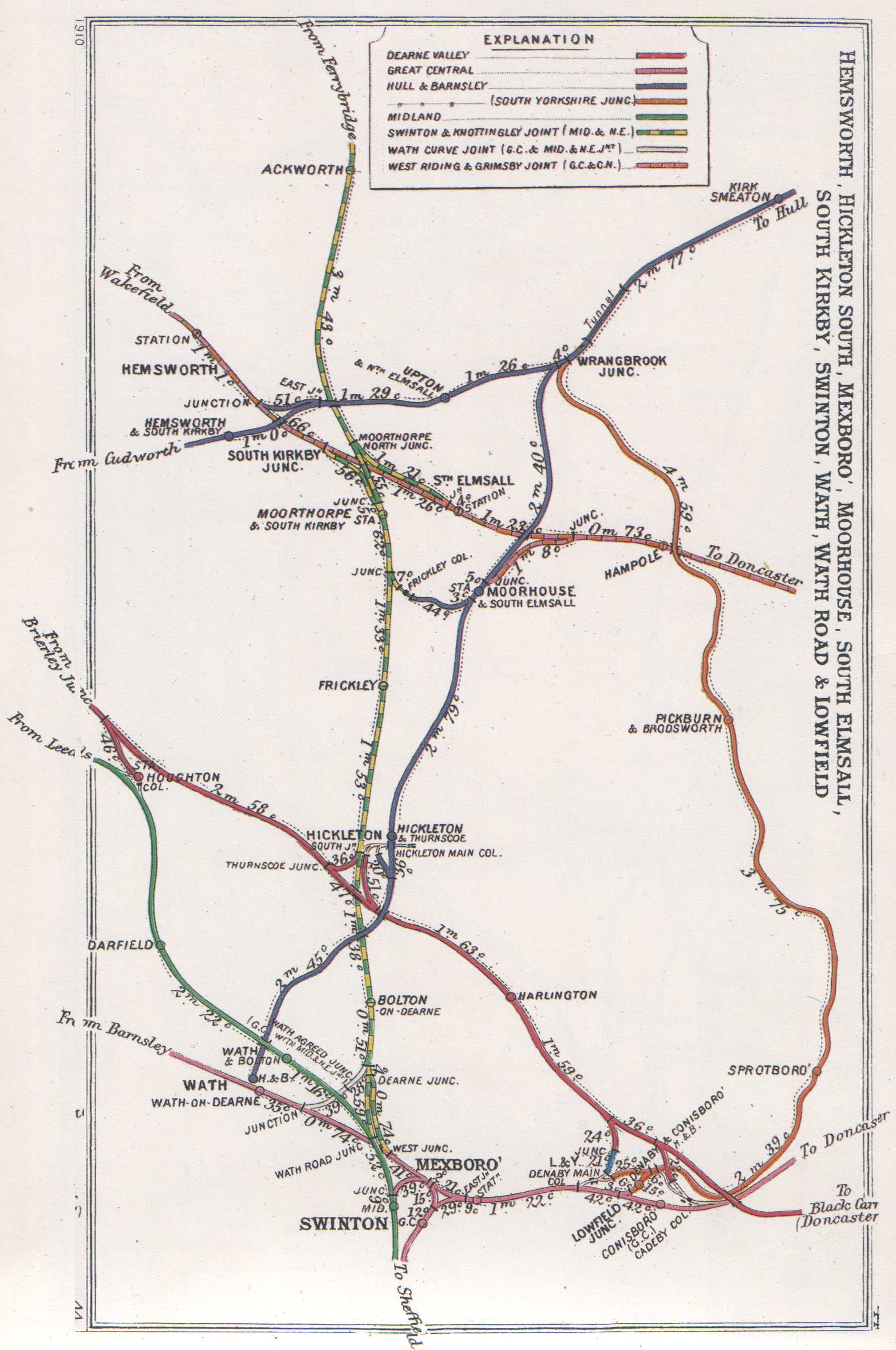
Railway Clearing House diagram of 1910, showing most of the route of the Swinton and Knottingley Joint Railway

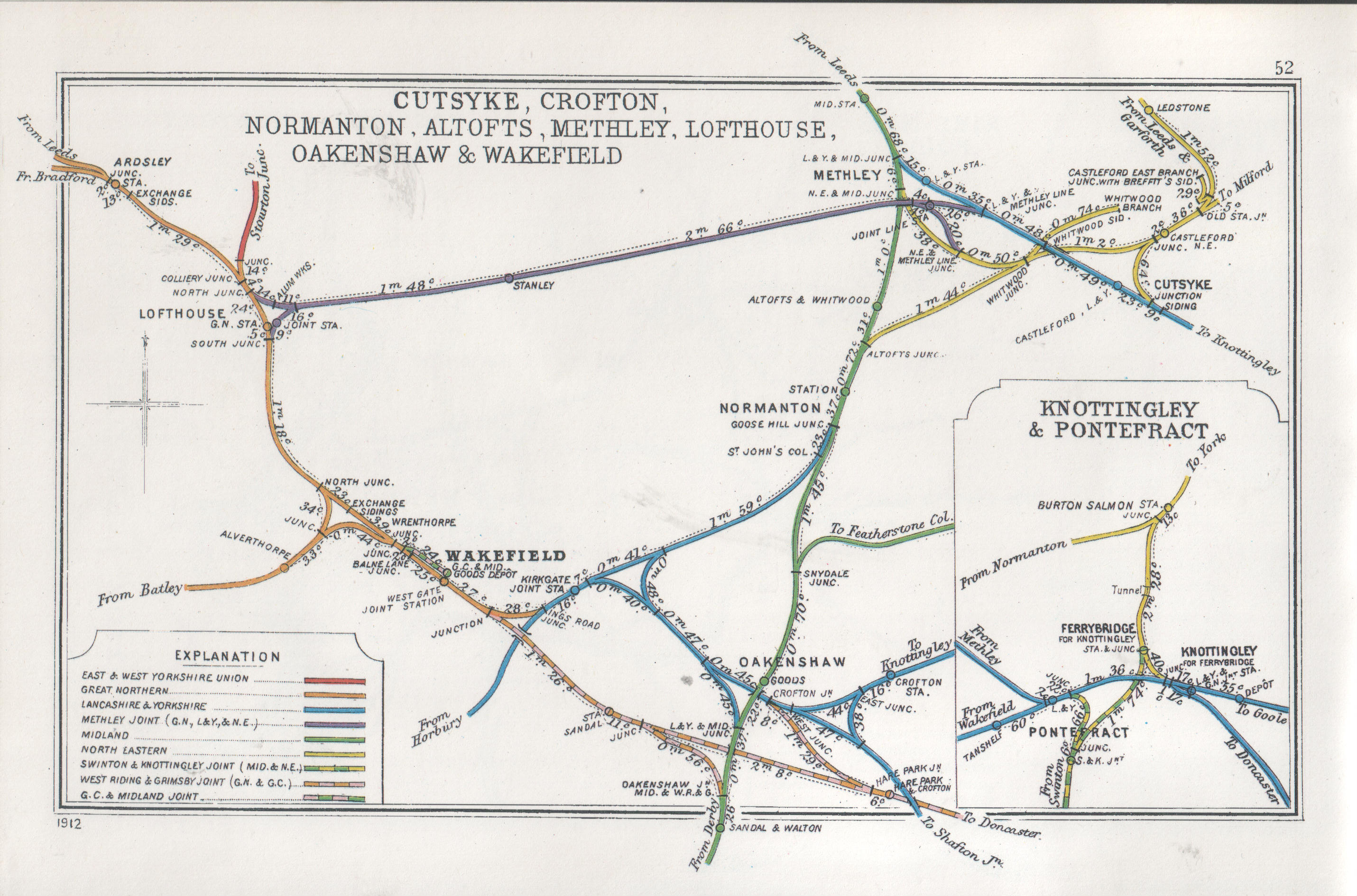
Railway Clearing House diagram showing the S&KJR connection with the NER at Ferrybridge, 1912.

The Swinton and Knottingley Joint Railway was a British railway company formed to connect the Midland and Great Central lines at Swinton, north of Rotherham, with the North Eastern Railway at Ferrybridge, near Knottingley, a distance of 16 miles (26 km), opening up a more direct route between York and the Sheffield area.

== History ==
The line between Swinton and Ferrybridge was jointly owned by the North Eastern and Midland Railways and later was jointly worked by their successors the London and North Eastern Railway and the London Midland and Scottish Railway.

Midland and North-eastern Railways Act 1874
- Act of Parliament
- Parliament of the United Kingdom
- Long title: An Act for enabling the Midland and North-eastern Railway Companies to make a Railway from the Midland Railway near Swinton to the North-eastern Railway near Knottingley; and for other purposes.
- Citation: 37 & 38 Vict. c. cxxxiii

Dates
- Royal assent: 16 July 1874

Text of statute as originally enacted

The line was authorised by the Midland and North-eastern Railways Act 1874 (37 & 38 Vict. c. cxxxiii) and opened on 1 May 1879, with stations at Ferrybridge (1882), Pontefract Baghill, Ackworth (1 July 1879), Moorthorpe, Frickley and Bolton-on-Dearne (1 July 1879).

A railway fifteen miles five furlongs five chains and eight yards in length, commencing in the township and parish of Adwick-upon-Dearne, in the west riding of the county of York, by a junction near Swinton with the Midland Railway, and terminating in the township of Ferry Fryston or Ferrybridge and parish of Ferry Fryston, in the said west riding, by a junction near Knottingley with the Knottingley branch of the North-eastern Railway. — Section 4, Midland and North-eastern Railways Act 1874 (37 & 38 Vict. c. cxxxiii)

The route is now the central section of the Dearne Valley Line between York and Sheffield and is operated by Northern. The section from Swinton to Moorthorpe is part of the line from Sheffield to Leeds, known as the Wakefield Line, since the closure of the North Midland route via Cudworth due to mining subsidence in 1985.
