= Pontefract Baghill railway station =

Railway station in West Yorkshire, England

Pontefract Baghill
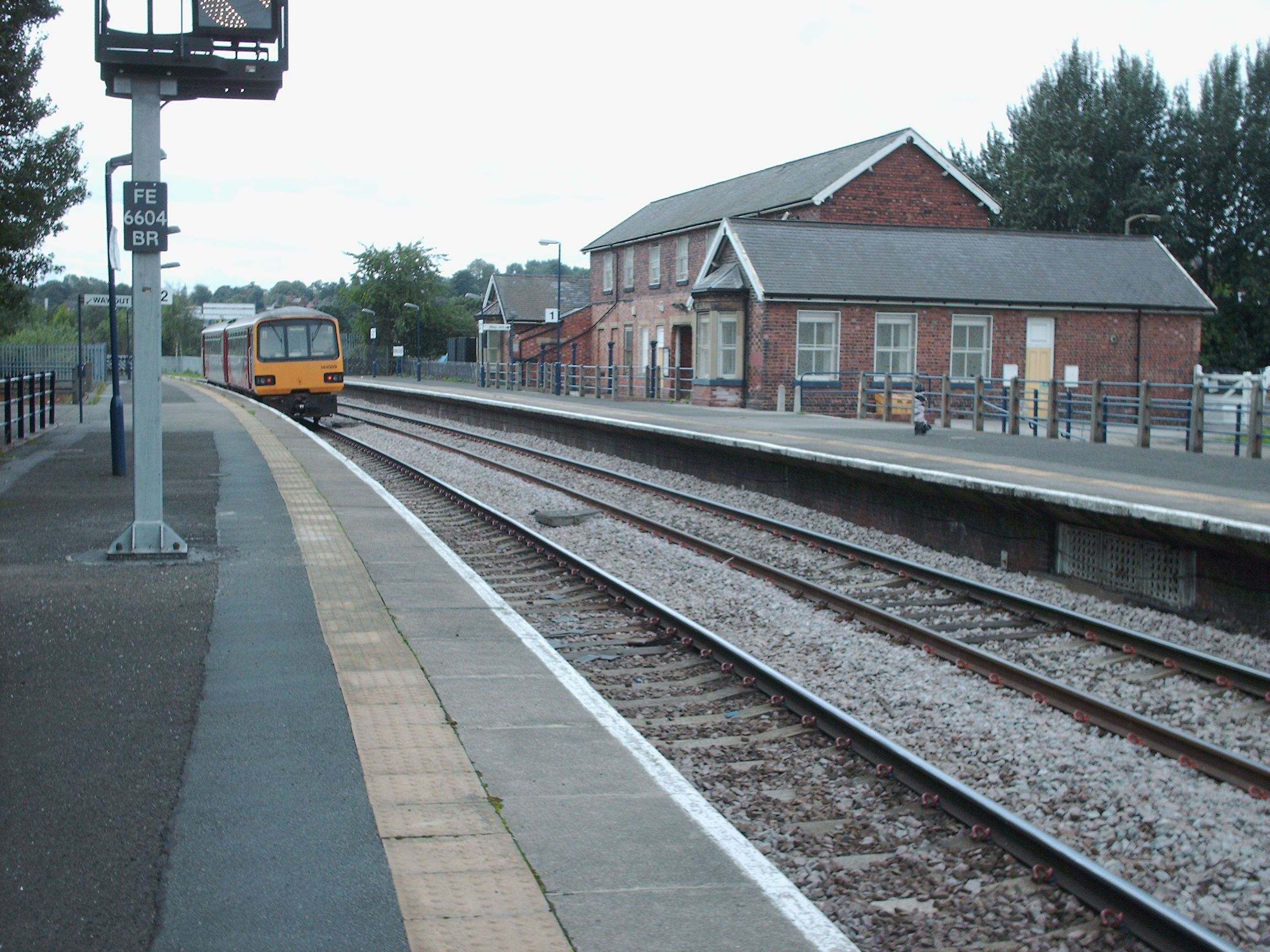
- View from platform 2, with a train towards Sheffield (August 2006)

General information
- Location: Pontefract, City of Wakefield, England
- Coordinates: 53.692°N 1.303°W
- Grid reference: SE461219
- Manager: Northern Trains
- Transit authority: West Yorkshire Metro
- Platforms: 3

Other information
- Station code: PFR
- Fare zone: 3
- Classification: DfT category F1

History
- Opened: 1 July 1879

Passengers
- 2021/22: ▲11,800
- 2022/23: ▼9,638
- 2023/24: ▲15,676
- 2024/25: ▲18,130
- 2025/26: ▲19,332
Location
Notes
- Passenger statistics from the Office of Rail and Road

Pontefract Baghill is one of three railway stations that serve the market town of Pontefract, in West Yorkshire, England. The other stations, Monkhill and Tanshelf, both lie on the Pontefract line, while Baghill lies on the Dearne Valley line, 21 1/4 miles (34 km) south of York towards Sheffield.

== History ==
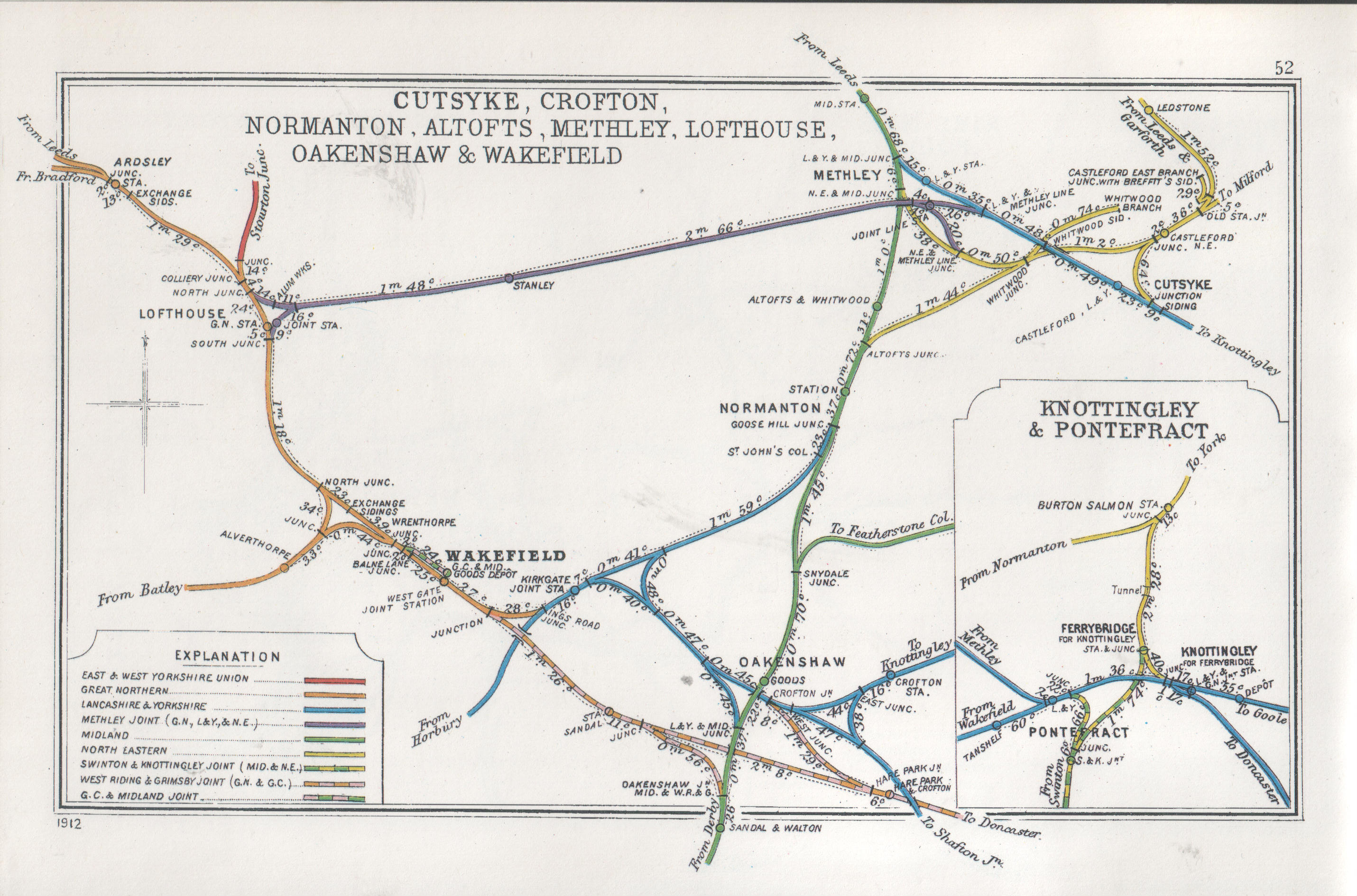
A 1912 Railway Clearing House junction diagram showing (lower right) railways in the vicinity of Pontefract Baghill (shown here as S&K Jnt.)

The station was opened together with the Ferrybridge to Moorthorpe section of the Swinton and Knottingley Joint Railway. Public passenger train services began on 1 July 1879; freight traffic had already started by then. The design of the station followed basic principles of the North Eastern Railway; it was, however, larger than the other stations opened on the line at the same time.

Pontefract Baghill was also once linked to the Wakefield, Pontefract & Goole main line, by means of a short chord to Monkhill, near the intersection of the two lines as shown on the above Railway Clearing House map. This connection closed in November 1964, but the bay platform it once used at the northern end can still be found. Two short curves north of the station near Ferrybridge connect the Dearne Valley Line to the western end of Knottingley westbound and the eastern end of Monkhill station (both on the Pontefract Line), but are now only in use for freight and diverted passenger services.

In the Strategic Rail Authority's 2002/3 financial year, only 15 people bought tickets for journeys from the station and 21 bought tickets for journeys ending there. (Note: The usage information (station entries and station exits) is based on ticket sales in the financial year 2002/03 and covers all National Rail stations. By 2004/05, the figure has risen to 53. The Strategic Rail Authority finds it difficult to allocate passenger usage numbers for stations grouped together (tickets are booked to Pontefract stations and not a specific one). Adjusted figures can be wrong either way, hence the sudden increase in the figures. In any event, usage is low although the figure can probably never be ascertained accurately.) It was the sixth least-used station in Great Britain at that time. The annual usage in recent years is still considerably lower than that of Monkhill and Tanshelf stations.

== Facilities ==
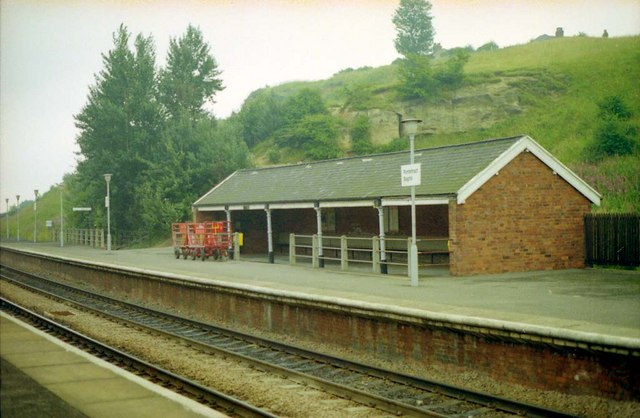
The station (July 1987)

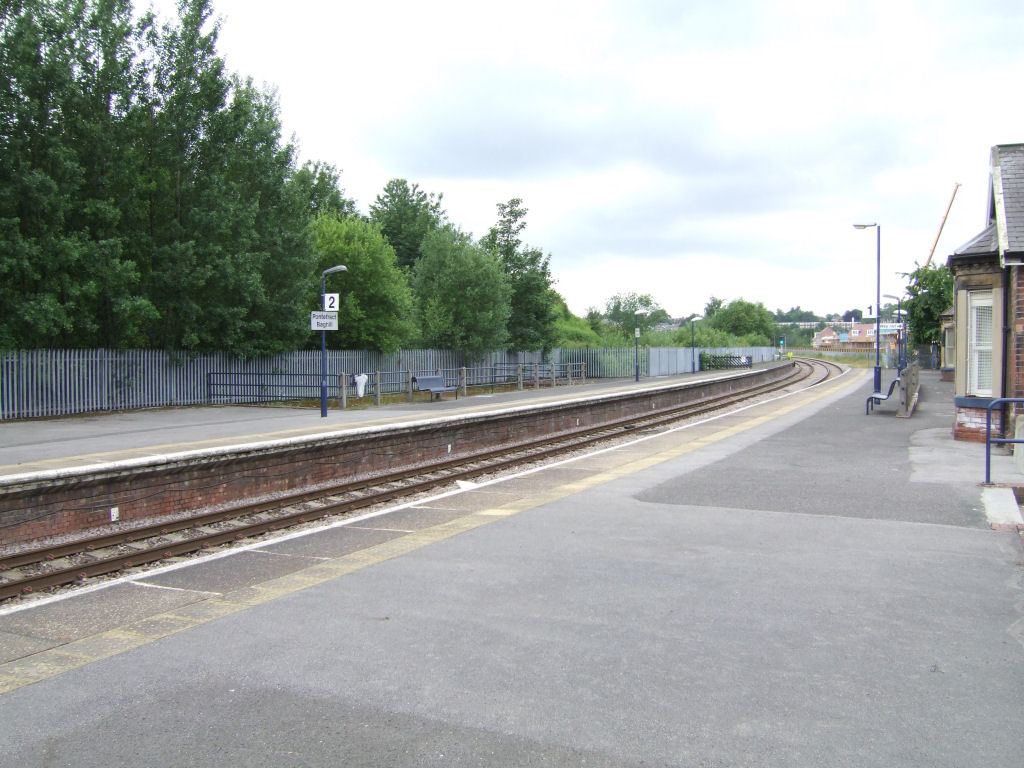
View of platform 2 from platform 1

The station has very basic amenities; it is unstaffed and has no ticketing provision. The only other facilities offered are bench seating, a public telephone and timetable information posters; the old main building still stands but is in private use). Step-free access is available to both platforms.

Neither platform has any shelter; though it is possible to wait under the passage in the former station building on the York-bound platform.

== Service ==
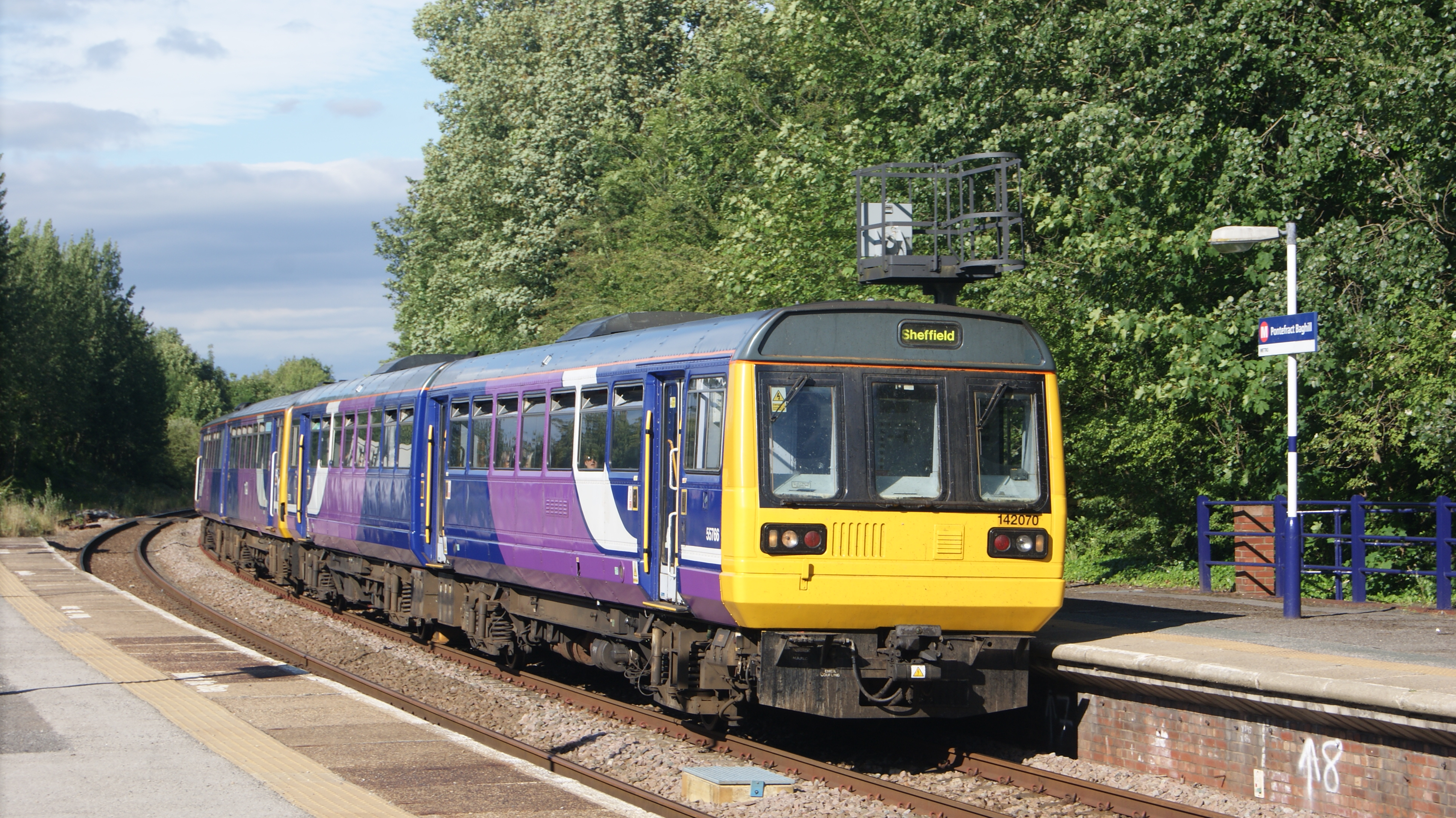
A Class 142 Pacer en route to Sheffield (July 2019)

Northern Trains operates the following limited service, in trains per day (tpd):

- 3 tpd to York
- 3 tpd to Sheffield.

This reduces to 2 tpd in each direction on Sundays.

Preceding station	National Rail	Following station
Moorthorpe	Northern Trains Dearne Valley line	Sherburn-in-Elmet
