= Swinton railway station (South Yorkshire) =

Railway station in South Yorkshire, England

Swinton (South Yorkshire)
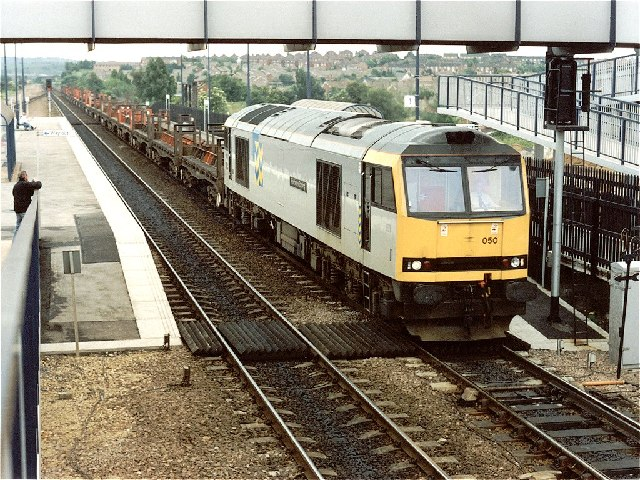
- Class 60 locomotive no. 60050 'Roseberry Topping' passes through platform 1 of Swinton railway station in 1991

General information
- Location: Swinton, Metropolitan Borough of Rotherham; England
- Coordinates: 53.4863°N 1.3058°W
- Grid reference: SK461990
- Managed by: Northern Trains
- Transit authority: Travel South Yorkshire
- Platforms: 3

Other information
- Station code: SWN
- Fare zone: Rotherham
- Classification: DfT category E

Key dates
- 14 May 1990: Opened

Passengers
- 2020/21: ▼73,522
- Interchange: ▼1,026
- 2021/22: ▲0.252 million
- Interchange: ▲2,354
- 2022/23: ▲0.263 million
- Interchange: ▼2,204
- 2023/24: ▲0.306 million
- Interchange: ▲2,909
- 2024/25: ▲0.346 million
- Interchange: ▲3,770
Location
Notes
- Passenger statistics from the Office of Rail and Road

Swinton railway station is a railway station in Swinton, South Yorkshire, England. It has three platforms and a small bus station, and lies at the junction of the former North Midland Railway main line between Rotherham Masborough and Leeds via Cudworth and the former South Yorkshire Railway line to Doncaster.

== History ==
There have been three stations on the North Midland Railway line at Swinton, the first of which, opened in 1840, built by the N.M.R. occupied the site of the present station, goods facilities occupying what is now the car park. This was replaced by a second station north of the present site, on the opposite side of the road bridge, built by the Midland Railway. This station became known as Swinton Town to distinguish it from Swinton Central on the former Manchester, Sheffield and Lincolnshire Railway line. It was served by stopping trains from Sheffield Midland to York and to Leeds City via Cudworth. The station closed in January 1968 with the rationalisation of local rail services in South Yorkshire. The original station buildings still remain at street level and are used for light industry.

== Redevelopment and rebuilding ==
By the late 1980s it was realised that South Yorkshire railways had been cut back too far in the 1960s; in particular, Swinton/Wath-upon-Dearne/Kilnhurst lacked a station. The South Yorkshire Passenger Transport Authority put forward a four-year plan for the improvement of services and stations as part of their Rail Development Plan, this leading to the re-instatement of the "Swinton Curve", from the former North Midland Railway at Swinton to the former South Yorkshire Railway at Mexborough West Junction, the building of a new station at Swinton and the re-routing of all passenger trains via this route. Immediately after reopening by British Rail in 1990 it was unstaffed, but increased passenger usage led to the establishment in the 1990s of initially a small cabin staffed for the morning peak period only. The cabin later was replaced by a brick building for the ticket office, waiting room and toilet. It is also an interchange for local bus services to Wath and Manvers.

The ticket office is staffed on Mondays to Saturday between 07:00 and 13:30. Outside these hours, passengers can buy tickets (or a permit to travel) from a ticket vending machine near the station entrance (card payments only). Shelters and passenger information screens are located on each platform, with a fully accessible footbridge linking the ticket hall with platforms 2 and 3.

== Services ==
The station has a similar service level to neighbouring Rotherham Central, namely one train per hour to Doncaster (one extending to Adwick), one per hour to Leeds via Moorthorpe and two per hour to Sheffield. The thrice-daily Dearne Valley local service to York also calls. The station sits on the main North East - South West corridor, which means various express services and freight trains pass through.

Sundays have hourly services to both Doncaster and Leeds and two trains per hour to Sheffield.

Services are generally formed of Northern Trains Class 150, Class 158 and Class 195 DMUs.

Since the May 2018 timetable change, Swinton no longer has direct trains to Scunthorpe or Lincoln, and the two TransPennine Express services that previously called here now pass through non-stop. The Hull stopping trains also ceased at the winter 2019 timetable change, so passengers must now change at Doncaster for onward connections.

Preceding station	National Rail	Following station
Rotherham Central	Northern Trains Dearne Valley Line	Moorthorpe
Rotherham Central	Northern Trains Wakefield Line	Bolton-upon-Dearne
Rotherham Central	Northern Trains Swinton to Doncaster Line	Mexborough
