= Bolton-upon-Dearne railway station =

Railway station in South Yorkshire, England

Bolton-upon-Dearne
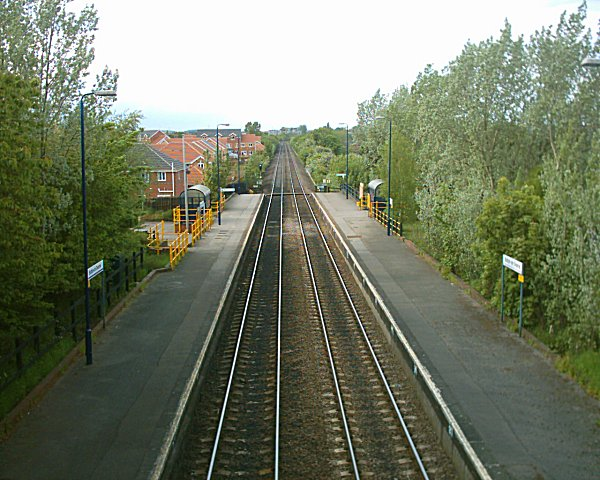

General information
- Location: Bolton upon Dearne, Metropolitan Borough of Barnsley; England
- Coordinates: 53.51880°N 1.31156°W
- Grid reference: SE457026
- Manager: Northern Trains
- Transit authority: Travel South Yorkshire
- Platforms: 2

Other information
- Station code: BTD
- Fare zone: Barnsley
- Classification: DfT category F2

History
- Original company: Swinton and Knottingley Joint Railway
- Pre-grouping: Swinton and Knottingley Joint Railway
- Post-grouping: Swinton and Knottingley Joint Railway

Key dates
- 1 July 1879: Opened as Hickleton
- 1 November 1879: Renamed Bolton-on-Dearne
- 15 January 1924: Renamed Bolton-on-Dearne for Goldthorpe
- 12 June 1961: Renamed Bolton-on-Dearne
- 3 April 2008: Renamed Bolton-upon-Dearne

Passengers
- 2020/21: ▼17,376
- 2021/22: ▲62,824
- 2022/23: ▲63,436
- 2023/24: ▲71,378
- 2024/25: ▲77,700
Location
Notes
- Passenger statistics from the Office of Rail and Road

Bolton-upon-Dearne railway station serves the village of Bolton upon Dearne in South Yorkshire, England. It lies on the Wakefield Line 13 miles (21 km) north of Sheffield railway station.

== History ==
Bolton-upon-Dearne railway station was opened by the Swinton and Knottingley Railway on 1 July 1879, and was originally named Hickleton. The station was renamed as Bolton-on-Dearne on 1 November 1879. The name was altered again on 15 January 1924 to become 'Bolton-on-Dearne For Goldthorpe', before reverting to 'Bolton-on-Dearne' on 12 June 1961. It was renamed Bolton-upon-Dearne on 3 April 2008.

The station was reported to be in the worst condition of any in South Yorkshire and the Passenger Transport Executive earmarked improvements to bring it up to a decent standard. Work to renew platforms (increase height, resurface), provide new waiting shelters and lighting was completed in November 2007. A new footbridge was opened in April 2010.

== Services ==
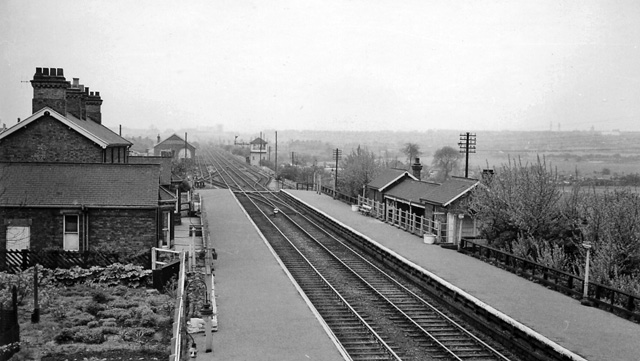
The station in 1962

Monday to Saturday, there is an hourly service to Sheffield southbound and to Leeds via Wakefield Westgate northbound. One northbound a.m. peak service to York also stops here. On Sundays, there is also an hourly service in each direction.

Preceding station	National Rail	Following station
Swinton	Northern Trains Wakefield Line	Goldthorpe
