= Outwood railway station =

Railway station in West Yorkshire, England

Outwood
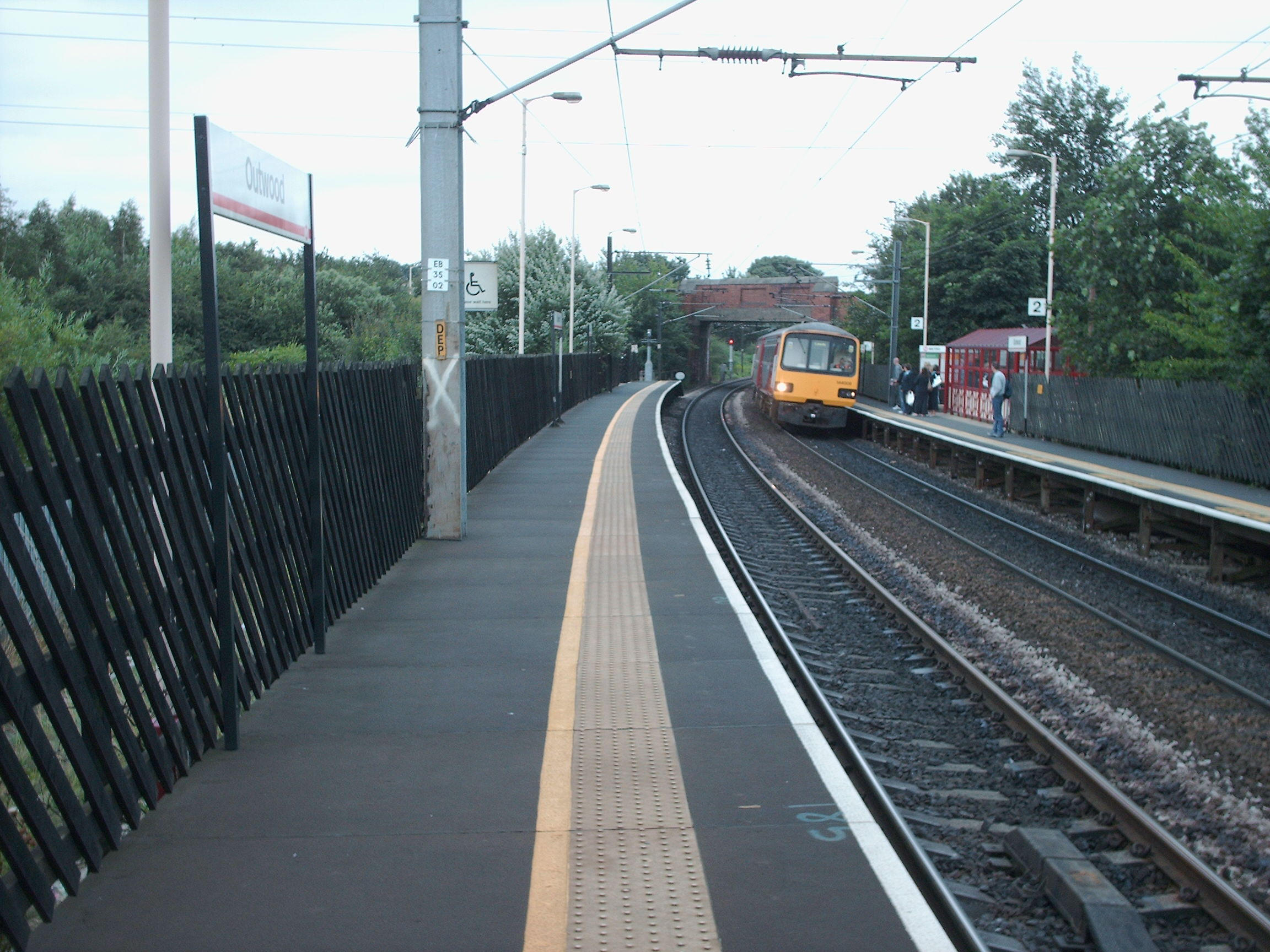
- Class 144 Pacer at Platform 2 in August 2006

General information
- Location: Outwood, City of Wakefield; England
- Coordinates: 53.71510°N 1.51043°W
- Grid reference: SE324244
- Manager: Northern
- Transit authority: West Yorkshire Metro
- Platforms: 2

Other information
- Station code: OUT
- Fare zone: 2
- Classification: DfT category F1

History
- Opened: 12 July 1988
- Original company: Bradford, Wakefield and Leeds Railway
- Pre-grouping: Great Northern Railway
- Post-grouping: London and North Eastern Railway

Key dates
- 1858: Opened as Lofthouse
- July 1865: Renamed Lofthouse and Outwood
- 13 June 1960: Closed
- 12 July 1988: Reopened as Outwood

Passengers
- 2020/21: ▼82,256
- 2021/22: ▲0.193 million
- 2022/23: ▲0.242 million
- 2023/24: ▲0.272 million
- 2024/25: ▲0.310 million
Location
Notes
- Passenger statistics from the Office of Rail and Road

Outwood railway station is situated in the Outwood district of Wakefield in West Yorkshire, England.

Outwood is the first stop on the Wakefield Line 7.5 miles (12 km) after Leeds for trains going towards Wakefield Westgate, Doncaster and Sheffield.

== History ==
The original station was opened by the Bradford, Wakefield and Leeds Railway in 1858, and was originally named Lofthouse. This was renamed Lofthouse and Outwood in July 1865. It closed on 13 June 1960. A different Lofthouse and Outwood station, which was on a different route, opened in 1876 and closed in 1958.

The station was reopened on 12 July 1988.

== Facilities ==
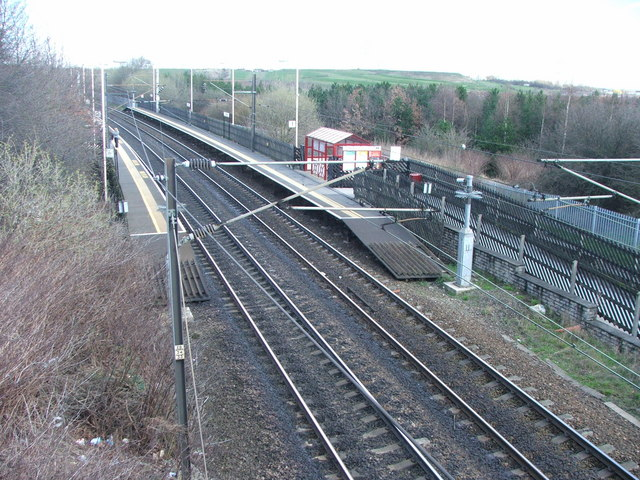
Both platforms of Outwood railway station

The station is unstaffed and has two wooden platforms with waiting shelters, customer help points, digital display screens, timetable posters and automated train announcements provide running information. Level access to both platforms is via ramps.

Outwood railway station has 130 free car parking spaces.

== Services ==
Monday to Saturday, two trains per hour head northbound to Leeds and southbound, one train per hour goes to Doncaster and one to Sheffield; both operate via Wakefield Westgate. In addition, the Sheffield service also goes via Rotherham Central.

On Sundays, a similar service frequency is in operation, although it starts later in the morning.

| Preceding station | National Rail | Following station |
|---|---|---|
| Wakefield Westgate | Northern Wakefield Line | Leeds |
