= Wakefield Westgate railway station =

Railway station in West Yorkshire, England

Wakefield Westgate
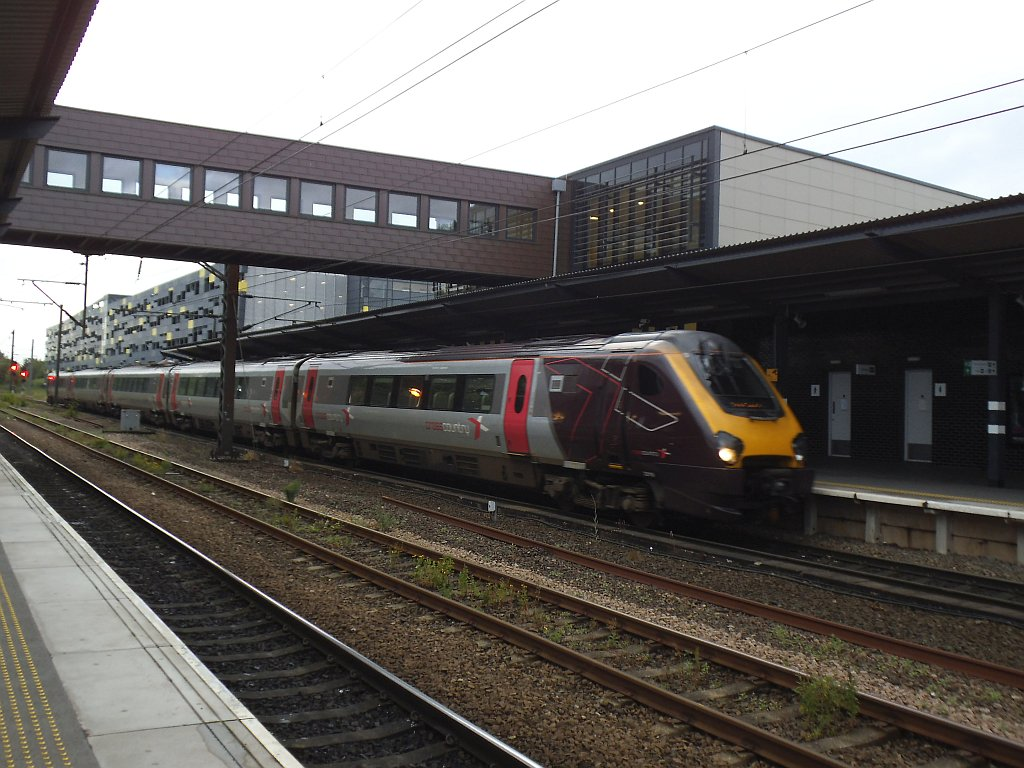
- A CrossCountry Voyager train calls at Wakefield Westgate station in July 2016

General information
- Location: Wakefield, City of Wakefield, England
- Coordinates: 53.6820°N 1.5055°W
- Grid reference: SE327207
- Manager: London North Eastern Railway
- Transit authority: West Yorkshire (Metro)
- Platforms: 2
- Tracks: 3

Other information
- Station code: WKF
- Fare zone: 3
- Classification: DfT category B

History
- Original company: Bradford, Wakefield and Leeds Railway; Manchester, Sheffield and Lincolnshire Railway; Lancashire and Yorkshire Railway; West Riding and Grimsby Railway

Key dates
- 1 May 1867: Station opened

Passengers
- 2020/21: ▼0.542 million
- Interchange: ▼18,753
- 2021/22: ▲1.790 million
- Interchange: ▲90,174
- 2022/23: ▲1.937 million
- Interchange: ▲105,852
- 2023/24: ▲2.057 million
- Interchange: ▲124,026
- 2024/25: ▲2.334 million
- Interchange: ▼116,315
Location
Notes
- Passenger statistics from the Office of Rail & Road

Wakefield Westgate is one of two railway stations that serve Wakefield, in West Yorkshire, England. It lies 10 miles (16 km) south of Leeds to the west of the city centre, on the Wakefield Line and Leeds branch of the East Coast Main Line.

The first Westgate station opened in 1856 a few years after the town's first station, Wakefield Kirkgate. In 1867, the station was rebuilt on the opposite side of Westgate, on the main line between Leeds and Doncaster. British Rail modernised the station in 1967, when large parts of the 19th-century station were demolished and replaced with austere but functional facilities. By the 21st century, there was pressure to modernise the station and, between 2009 and 2013, the station was rebuilt and modernised as a result of regeneration efforts focused upon the wider area. On 3 February 2014, the rebuilt station was officially opened.

== History ==
=== Early history ===
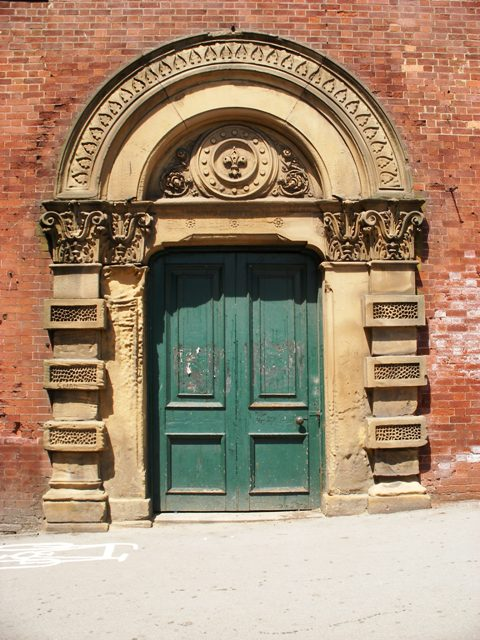
Entrance to the 1867 station near the bridge on Westgate, July 2008

During 1856, the first Westgate station opened; this was shortly after the spur line from the town's first station, Wakefield Kirkgate, was built. Its southern side was built for the Bradford, Wakefield and Leeds Railway, which was operated by the Great Northern Railway (GNR) on part of the private estate belonging to wealthy cloth merchant John Milnes; his mid-18th century mansion was partially demolished and its remains were incorporated into the station.

The station was used for ten years before further developments necessitated its demolition and rebuilding. No traces remain of the original station as the site was levelled and premises for Wakefield School were built on the site. The school has since been demolished.

A new station opened on the opposite side of Westgate in 1867, having been authorised by the West Riding and Grimsby Railway Act 1864 (27 & 28 Vict. c. xci). It was constructed for the GNR, the Manchester, Sheffield and Lincolnshire Railway and the Lancashire and Yorkshire Railway on the main line from Leeds to Doncaster, which approached Westgate from the north on an embankment before passing through the station and over the bridge in Westgate, at the start of a 99-arch viaduct. The station was designed by Leeds engineer, J. B. Fraser. Built at a cost of £60,000, it was described by a local newspaper as "one of the most perfect stations in England – special care in designing the works having been taken…in order that every facility might be given for the easy and expeditious working of the goods and passenger traffic." A prominent feature was a turreted tower, which, as a result of lobbying by the Wakefield Tradesmen's Association, was converted into a four-faced clock tower in June 1880. The clock's mechanism was designed by the horologist and lawyer Sir Edmund Beckett and made by Potts of Leeds.

=== Twentieth century ===
Starting in 1967, British Rail embarked on an extensive rebuild of the second station, resulting in the removal of the clock tower and most of the station buildings. The station's decorative and elegant frontage and pavilion roof were demolished and replaced with an austere counterpart. The rebuilt station was "aesthetically inferior to its earlier incarnation, soon proved to be too cramped to cope with a rise in passenger numbers." It was poorly laid out with few opportunities for retail and other services. Infilling the station forecourt to the level of the first-storey platform provided direct access to the up platform level, but there was no level access to the down platform except via a barrow crossing.

Westgate became the main station in the town because of its location on the main line from Leeds to London. Until the mid-1960s, it had regular services to Bradford Exchange via Batley and Ossett and via Morley Top and also to Castleford via the Methley Joint Railway, but these services fell victim to the Beeching cuts between 1964 and 1966.

The station was electrified along with the rest of the Leeds branch of the East Coast Main Line in the late 1980s. During this time the up through line towards Doncaster was removed, in order to allow the electrification masts to be erected.

=== Regeneration ===
Improvements to Westgate station were constrained by a lack of funding. In early 2007 Network Rail announced that a £1.4 million redevelopment scheme was planned for the station to take place by the end of 2009. The scheme was a part of the Westgate Key Development Area authorised by Wakefield Council. The scheme involved constructing offices, leisure, small-scale retail, hotel, restaurants and housing on the site of an old dairy and disused railway goods yards. In 2009, work on the Merchant Gate development commenced and work on the first phase was completed by September 2010.

Four years later, Westgate station was rebuilt at the northern end of the platforms and the former overflow car park. Key aims of the project were nearly doubling station's retail facilities, an improved forecourt area, station management centre, staff offices, a customer information point, a first class waiting room and standard class waiting facilities, and the installation of new passenger information technologies and automated ticket barriers to reduce fare evasion. Better pedestrian access to the multi-storey car park and taxi ranks were provided.

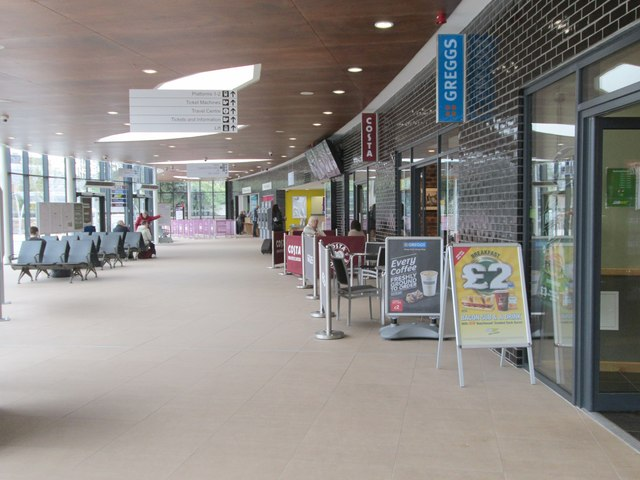
The new concourse, April 2014

Few elements of the modernisation programme interfered with the operational railway, except for the installation of additional canopies and the replacement footbridge. The old footbridge and some 1960s station buildings were removed. Wakefield Westgate was the first newly built station on the East Coast Main Line in decades. The programme was an element of the third phase of Merchant Gate redevelopment scheme and promoted by its backers as being a key part of the area's renewal. Network Rail was appointed by East Coast as the principal contractor for the programme and the Buckingham Group was the design-and-build subcontractor. Designed by Carey Jones Chapman Tolcher and RICS 2015 Awards shortlisted, Pro Yorkshire, Best Infrastracture.

In January 2013, after planning permission was granted on-site preparations began and in March rebuilding commenced at a cost of £8.8 million, a large portion was provided via the Station Commercial Project Facility (SCPF), and 1 million each from the Access for All programme and the English Cities Fund. On 23 December 2013, the station opened to service and on 3 February 2014, it was officially opened by Secretary of State for Transport Patrick McLoughlin and blessed by the Bishop of Wakefield, Stephen Platten.

== Facilities ==
The station is staffed and has an information kiosk, ticket office and self-service ticket machines, refreshments and a newsagent. Outside is a taxi rank, a cashpoint and a bus stop. Train running information is via digital display screens, timetable posters and automatic announcements. Lifts and a footbridge connect the platforms, so step-free access is available throughout the station.

== Services ==
In total, there are 6 tph to Leeds with additional peak services. All northbound services call at Leeds.

The station is served by three train operating companies:

- London North Eastern Railway services run south from platform 1 to Doncaster and stations to London King's Cross and north from platform 2 to Leeds, although one train per weekday operates non-stop to London King’s Cross, departing at 07:13. A half-hourly weekday service to London takes approximately just over 2 hours for the 175 miles (282 km) journey.
- CrossCountry operates services north to Edinburgh, Glasgow and Aberdeen and south to Plymouth and Penzance. These call every hour with some additional peak services.
- Northern Trains operates stopping services between Leeds and Doncaster, calling every hour on weekdays and Saturdays. An hourly stopping service also operates from Sheffield to Leeds via Rotherham. Introduced at the May 2018 Timetable change, there is now another hourly service to Leeds. This train originates at Knottingley and runs via Pontefract Monkhill and Wakefield Kirkgate. This gives a 3tph Northern Trains service to Leeds (of which, 2tph call at Outwood). Since December 2025, there is the "Yorkshire Flyer", an hourly fast service between Leeds and Sheffield with Wakefield Westgate being the only intermediate stop, complementing the CrossCountry service.

Preceding station	National Rail	Following station
Sheffield	CrossCountry Cross Country Route	Leeds
Doncaster Limited service	CrossCountry Cross Country Route	Leeds
Doncaster	London North Eastern Railway; London – Leeds	Leeds
Sheffield	Northern Trains Yorkshire Flyer	Leeds
Wakefield Kirkgate	Northern Trains Pontefract line	
Sandal & Agbrigg	Northern Trains Wakefield Line	Outwood

== Cultural references ==
Between 1988 and 2009, a modern art sculpture, titled 'A Light Wave', created by the Leeds-based artist Charles Quick, was located on the wall behind the old bay platform on the northbound side of the station. The installation comprised a series of wooden planks laid up against a wall, in the form of waves, and illuminated from behind by a succession of lamps. The sculpture gradually fell into a state of disrepair, which prompted its removal.
