= Sandal (disambiguation) =

A sandal is an open type of outdoor footwear also known as a shoe

== Places ==
- Konar Sandal, archaeological site in Kermān Province, Iran
- Konar Sandal, Iran, a village in Hoseynabad Rural District, Esmaili District, Anbarabad County, Kerman Province, Iran
- Šandal, a village in Slovakia
- Sandal, Afghanistan
- Sandal, Iran, a village in Khuzestan Province, Iran
- Sandal, Tarsus a village in Tarsus district of Mersin Province, Turkey
- Sandal, Wakefield, West Yorkshire, England
- Sandal Castle, site of the Battle of Wakefield in the Wars of the Roses
- Sandals Cay, part of the Sandals Royal Caribbean all-inclusive resort
- Sarab-e Sandal, a village in Honam Rural District, in the Central District of Selseleh County, Lorestan Province, Iran
- Seat Sandal, a fell in the English Lake District
- Sandals, Missouri, a community in the United States

== Footwear ==
- Bernardo Sandals, American footwear
- Episcopal sandals, or pontifical sandals
- Rainbow Sandals, an American company specializes in men's and women's leather, hemp, and rubber flip-flops
- Saltwater sandals, American footwear
- Sandals of Jesus Christ, a medieval relic displayed at Prum Abbey in Germany
- T-bar sandal, American closed, low-cut shoe

== Other uses ==
- Sandal (textile), a light material
- Hermes Fastening his Sandal, Roman marble copies of a lost Greek bronze original sculpture
- Mujhay Sandal Kar Do, a Pakistani drama television series
- Mysore Sandal Soap, a soap brand in India
- Sandal and Walton railway station, railway station between Sandal and Walton in West Yorkshire, England
- Sandals Church, a church in Riverside, California, USA
- Sandals Resorts, a Caribbean luxury resorts operator
- Sandalwood, aromatic plant
- SS-4 Sandal, NATO reporting name for the R-12 Dvina theatre ballistic missile
- The Sandals, American surf rock band
- Korsi, a heated table also referred to as a sandal in Uzbekistan

== People ==
- Sandal (surname)

== See also ==
- Sandalwood (disambiguation), a class of woods from trees in the genus Santalum
  - Kannada cinema or Sandalwood, film industry of Karnataka, India also known as Sandalwood
