= Swinton Town railway station =

Disused railway station in South Yorkshire, England

Swinton Town
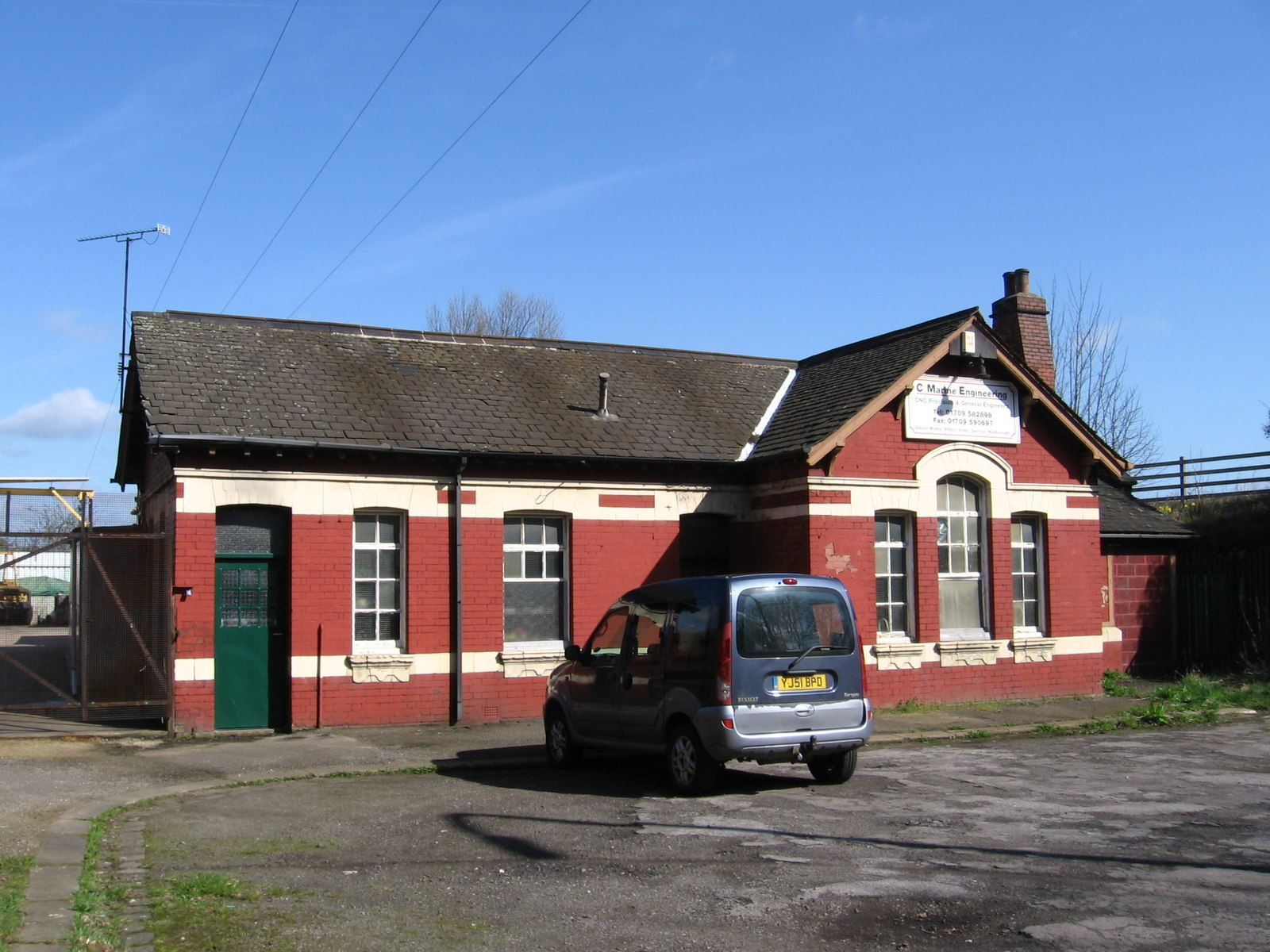
- Station building, now used as offices (2010)

General information
- Location: Swinton, Rotherham; England
- Coordinates: 53.4881°N 1.3057°W
- Grid reference: SK461992
- Platforms: 4

Other information
- Status: Disused

History
- Original company: North Midland Railway
- Pre-grouping: Midland Railway

Key dates
- 1899: opened
- 1968: closed
Location

Swinton Town railway station was the second railway station built on the North Midland Railway to serve Swinton, near Rotherham, South Yorkshire, England. The station was opened on 2 July 1899 when traffic was transferred from the first station.

The station replaced the original and was built to its north, on the opposite side of the bridge which takes the road to Mexborough below the line. The main station building was at road level and this contained the booking office, parcels office and stationmaster's room. This remains, in use, as the offices of a manufacturing company.

The station had four platform faces on two island platforms, one set between the Up and Down main lines, the other between the Up and Down slow lines. Access to the platforms was by a path and subway from the booking office. Both platforms had wooden waiting rooms.

Train services ran to Sheffield Midland, Leeds City via Cudworth along the North Midland route and Doncaster on the original South Yorkshire Railway route.

In 1963 the station was refurbished and equipped with electric lighting, along with some other stations on the line. The station and the signal box were also repainted.

Along with other stations on the line the station closed in January 1968 and the platform buildings demolished shortly afterwards. In 1991 an all new station was built south of the bridge on the location of the original station.

Preceding station	Disused railways	Following station
Kilnhurst West	BR Eastern Region; Sheffield-Cudworth-Leeds Line	Wath North
