= Cat Hill Tunnel =

Railway tunnel in South Yorkshire, England

Coordinates: 53.5333°N 1.3637°W

Cat Hill Tunnel was a railway tunnel that ran through Darfield, South Yorkshire, England, leading to Darfield railway station (now closed). The tunnel was built by George Stephenson for the North Midland Railway opened in 1840. It was 154 yards long (one of the longest in the region) and ran under fields into Darfield station from the Cathill Road end of Darfield.

The railway bridge was removed in the 1990s. Steps that led to Darfield station may be found beyond the western abutment. The station was originally at the Broomhill end of the tunnel but in 1880 was moved nearer to the road when the tunnel was 'scalped' into a cutting.

The remains of Darfield station can be found at its former Doncaster Road site. The original station was built 45 chains to the south at the Cathill Road site near to Broomhill in 1840.
