= Santhanam =

Santhanam or Santanam is an Indian name that may refer to:

== People ==
- K. Santhanam (1895–1980), Indian politician
- Madabusi Santanam Raghunathan (born 1941), Indian mathematician
- Maharajapuram Santhanam (1928–1992), Carnatic music vocalist
- M. R. Santhanam, Indian actor and producer
- N. Santhanam (born 1980), Indian actor and comedian
- Srini Santhanam (born 1984), Indian-American cricketer
- T. Santhanam (c. 1970–2022), Indian art director
- Vaidhyanathaswamy Santhanam (born 1925), Indian cotton scientist

== Other uses ==
- Santhanam (film), a 1955 Indian Telugu-language film

== See also ==
- Santan (disambiguation)
- Santana (disambiguation)
- Chandan (disambiguation)
- Chandana (disambiguation)
