= Dennis Comeau =

American fashion designer

Dennis Comeau (born 1965) is an American shoe designer and former new wave vocalist and guitarist. Musically he is best remembered for his short-lived band Hormones with Stiv Bators and Andre Siva, his band Flustercunk, and collaborations with members of Pere Ubu, and DNA. Flustercunk notoriously opened for Blondie at CBGB in 1982, and were kicked out and asked not to return after a fight broke out in the crowd and Comeau was hit in the face with a bottle and hospitalized. The band was accused of "inciting a riot", though band members denied the accusation.

After leaving the music industry, Comeau became an assistant to shoe designer Enzo Angiolini, now owned by Jones New York. Moving to Florence, Italy in the mid-1980s, Comeau launched both a couture line of ladies shoes, and followed up a few years later with a bridge line under the Comeaution label.

In 2001 Comeau acquired the then-defunct Bernardo Sandals label along with his business partner Roy Smith of Houston, Texas. A higher-priced line under the label "Bernardo Vintage Couture" was launched worldwide in 2011, consisting mostly of re-issued sandals designed by Bernard Rudofsky and Eva Sonino. Bernardo was sold in 2011, and Comeau and wife Lynne resigned from their design position with the brand in March 2013.

In February 2013, Comeau and his wife acquired the historic shoe brand Golo to revive it.

The Herbert Levine line was also briefly designed and owned by Comeau.

Comeau and wife Lynne relocated to Tesuque, New Mexico, in 2006, where they jointly own and operate a shoe design studio along with the studio in Florence, Italy.

== Discography ==
7" Singles

- What's Under Your Genes? - Sire Records 1982
- 21 and Dead - Revenge, 1982 (Import/France)
- I Know You are but What am I? - Apex Records 1982
