= Chandon (disambiguation) =

Chandon is a commune in the Loire department, France.

Chandon may also refer to:

- Chandon (name), a surname and given name
- Chandon (Fribourg), a former commune in the canton of Fribourg, Switzerland
- Domaine Chandon California, an American winery

== See also ==
- Moët & Chandon, a French winery
- Chandan (disambiguation)
