= Royston and Notton railway station =

Disused railway station in South Yorkshire, England

Royston and Notton
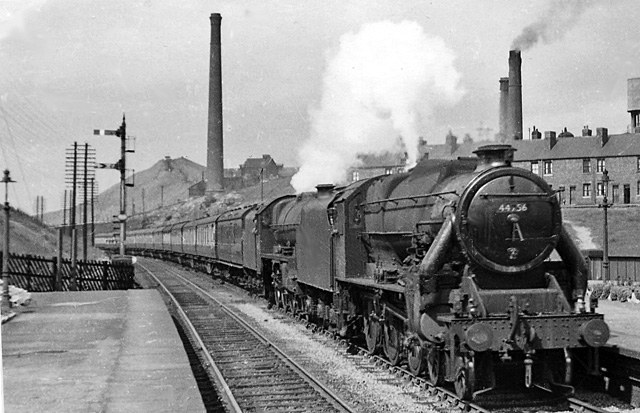
- The station in 1951

General information
- Location: Royston, Metropolitan Borough of Barnsley; England
- Coordinates: 53.59993°N 1.43645°W
- Grid reference: SE373116
- Platforms: 4

Other information
- Status: Disused

History
- Original company: Midland Railway
- Post-grouping: London, Midland and Scottish Railway

Key dates
- 6 April 1841: Station opened
- 1 July 1900: replaced with new station
- 1 January 1968: Station closed
Location

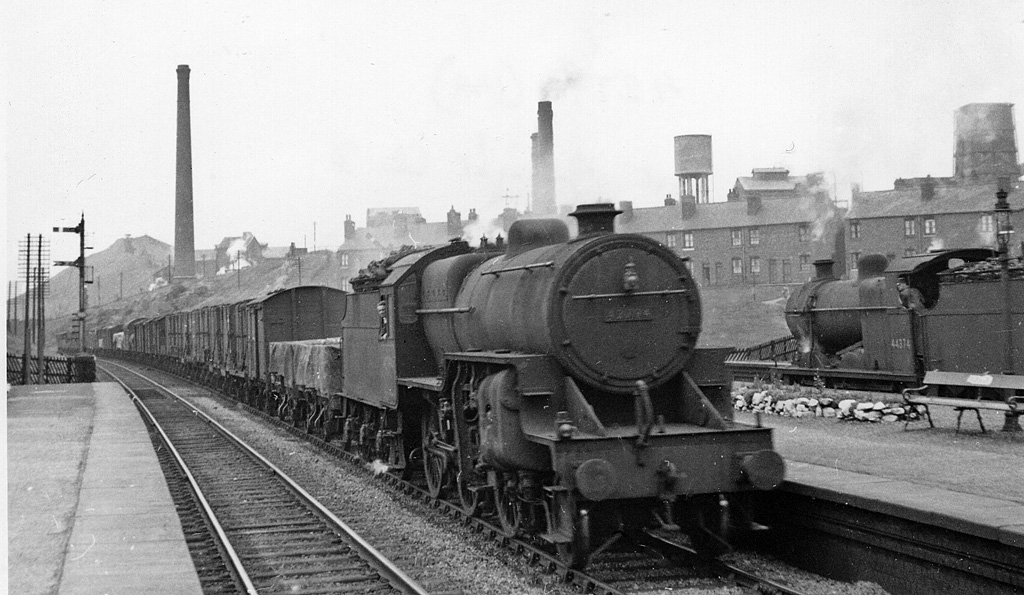
Up fast freight train in 1951

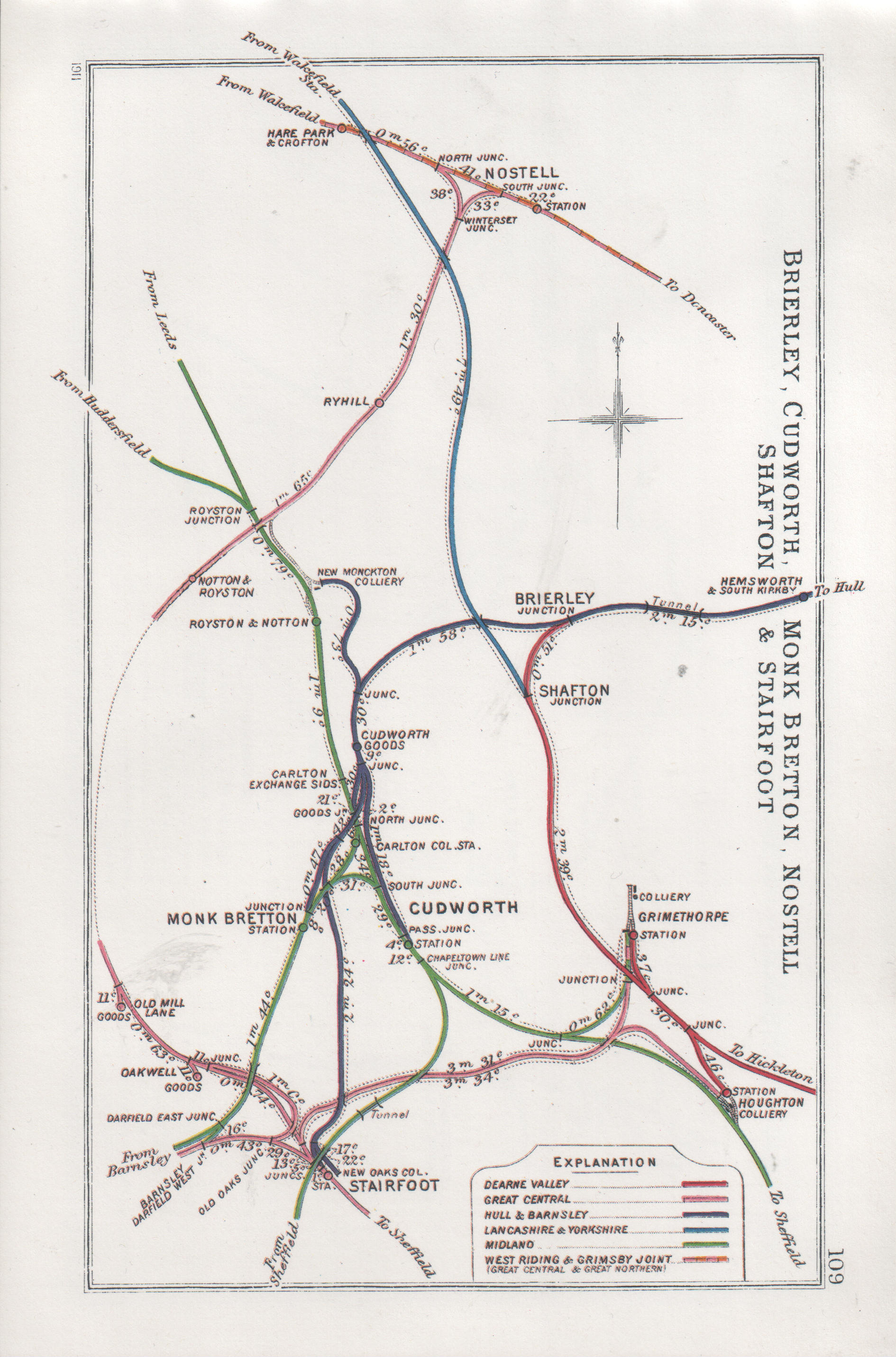
Railway Clearing House diagram including Royston and Notton in 1911

Royston and Notton railway station was opened in 1841 by the North Midland Railway, near the Yorkshire summit of the line, on the south side of Navvy Lane bridge.

The original station was rebuilt, about a mile further south, in 1900 when the lines were quadrupled. Shortly after this, the Midland Railway built a branch from Royston Junction to the north of the station as part of its plans to reach Bradford and the north, avoiding Leeds. In the end, the Lancashire and Yorkshire Railway gave it running powers and the branch only reached Dewsbury.

It was a large station with four platforms and typical Midland Railway timber buildings although only 2 platforms were used regularly for passenger services. It closed in 1968.

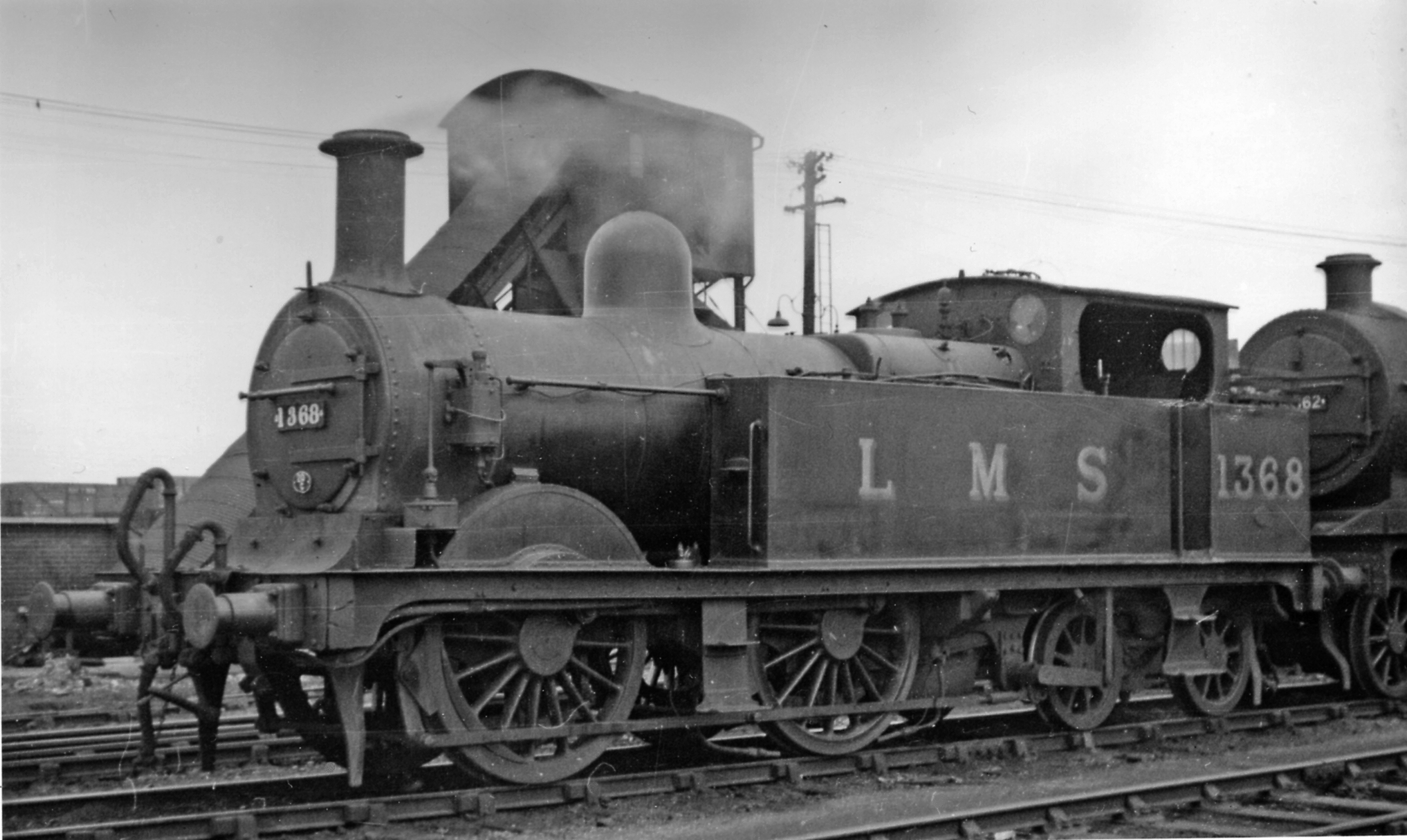
Ex-Midland 1P 0-4-4T at Royston Locomotive Depot

Nearby was the Royston engine shed built in the early 1930s, code 20C, to provide motive power for trains from the large collieries of the area. Most of its allocation was Stanier and WD 2-8-0s plus the ubiquitous Fowler 4F's, but ex LNWR 0-8-0s and LMS Garratts were not unknown.

Preceding station	Historical railways	Following station
Cudworth; Line closed; station closed	Midland Railway; North Midland Railway	Sandal and Walton; Line exists; station closed
