= Chandana =

Chandana (Sanskrit, 'sandalwood') may refer to:

== People ==
- Chandana Abayarathna (fl. from 2024), Sri Lankan politician
- Chandana Aravinda (born 1982), Sri Lankan cricketer
- Chandana Banerjee (born 1953), Indian actress and model
- Chandana Bauri (fl. 2021), Indian politician
- Chandana Dixit (fl. 1995), Bollywood playback singer
- Chandana Mazumdar (fl. from 1979), Bangladeshi folk singer
- Chandana Ramesh (fl. from 2015), Indian politician
- Chandana Sarkar (fl. 2021), Indian politician
- Chandana Sharma (born 1982), Indian actress
- Chandana Sooriyaarachchi (fl. from 2024), Sri Lankan politician
- Chandana Welikala (born 1963), Sri Lanka Air Force officer
- Acharya Chandana (born 1937), Indian Jain nun
- K. Chandana (died 2008), Sri Lankan army soldier
- Mani Chandana (fl. from 1998), Indian actress
- Surbhi Chandna (born 1989), Indian actress
- Upul Chandana (born 1972), Sri Lankan cricketer

== Other uses ==
- Chandana River, in Bangladesh
- DD Chandana, a Kannada TV channel

== See also ==
- Chandan (disambiguation)
- Santhanam (disambiguation)
- Sandalwood (disambiguation)
- Kannada cinema, native name Chandanavana
