= Darfield railway station =

Disused railway station in South Yorkshire, England

Darfield
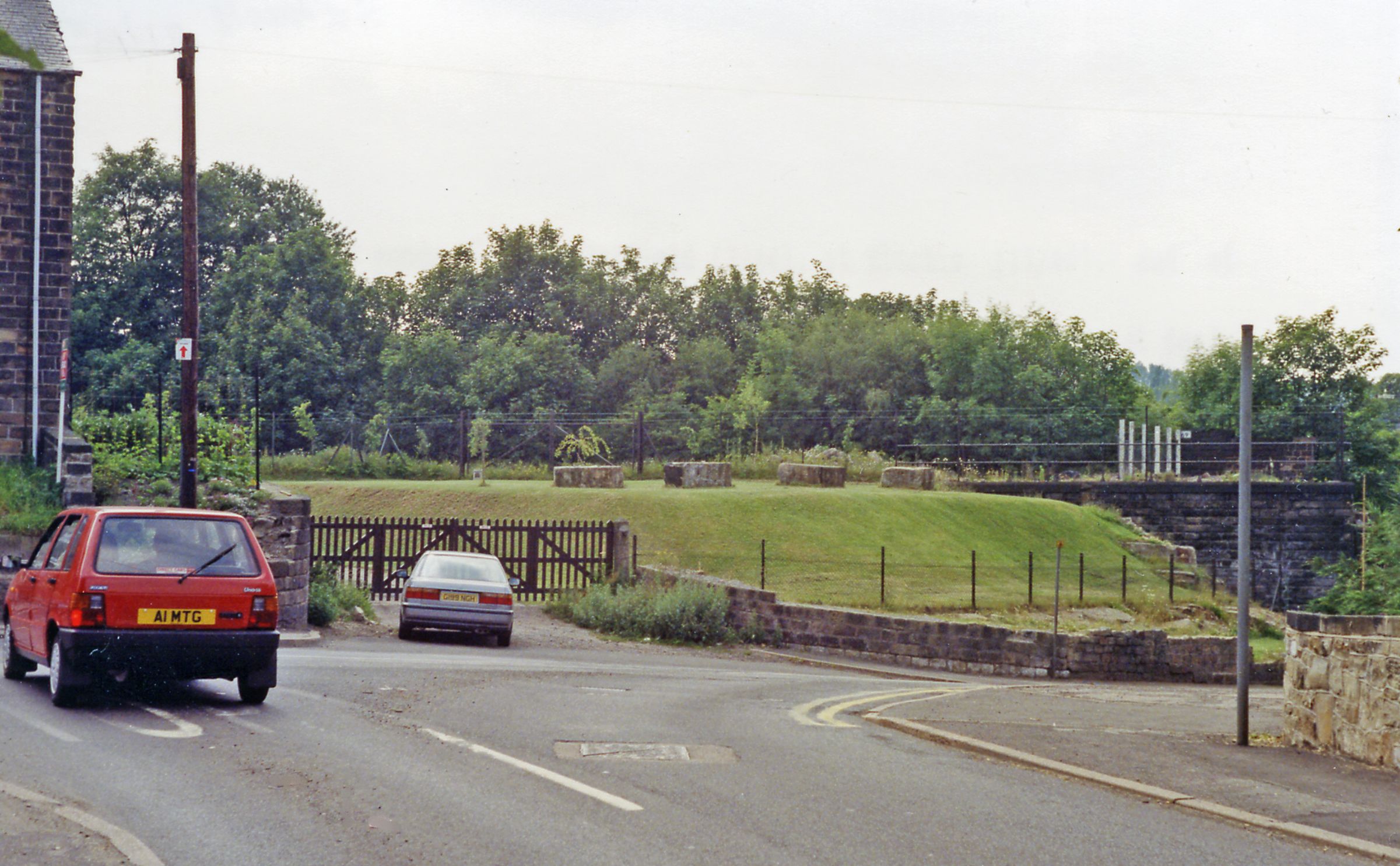
- Location of the former station (1992)

General information
- Location: Darfield, Metropolitan Borough of Barnsley; England
- Coordinates: 53.53499°N 1.36296°W
- Grid reference: SE423044

Other information
- Status: Disused

History
- Original company: North Midland Railway
- Pre-grouping: Midland Railway
- Post-grouping: London, Midland and Scottish Railway

Key dates
- 1 July 1840: Station opened
- 30 June 1901: replaced with new station
- 17 June 1963: Station closed
Location

Darfield railway station was opened in 1840 by the North Midland Railway, serving the village of Darfield in South Yorkshire, England.

The original station building was of typical Francis Thompson Italianate design. Immediately north of it was Cat Hill Tunnel which was opened out when the line was quadrupled, and, in 1901, the station was rebuilt 15 chains further north next to the Doncaster road. A terrace of four cottages is shown on Ordnance Survey maps as "Railway Cottages" long after all other traces of the old station and its small goods yard had been removed. The last appearance of the cottages was on the OS map of 1955–56. Access to the cottages was by a drive which ran south to Cat Hill Road between Broomhill and the skew bridge which carried the railway over the road.

The new station had typical Midland Railway timber panelled buildings. The new goods lines passed to the east. These had access to three major collieries – Grimethorpe, Dearne Valley and Houghton Main – and connected to the GCR and L&Y lines.

The station closed in June 1963 and the line closed in 1988.

Preceding station	Disused railways	Following station
Wath North	BR Eastern Region; Sheffield-Cudworth-Leeds Line	Cudworth
