= Chandan =

Chandan may refer to:

- Chandan, is a surname used by Hindus in India
- Chandana, the Sanskrit name for Indian sandalwood (Santalum album)
- Chandan (film), a 1958 film
- Chandan Hola, a census town in Delhi
- Chandan Yatra, an Indian festival
- Chandan, son of Panna Dai, 16th century nursemaid who let him be murdered to save the life of the heir to the throne of Mewar
- Chandan Brahma, Indian politician
- Chandan Dass, Indian singer
- Chandan Kumar, Indian actor
- Chandan Channakeshava, Indian entrepreneur
- Chandan Prabhakar, Indian comedian
- Chandan Shetty, Indian composer
- Chandan Dass, Indian ghazal singer

== See also ==
- Chandana (disambiguation)
- Chandon (disambiguation)
- Sandalwood (disambiguation)
- Santhanam (disambiguation)
