= Ralph O'Donnell =

English footballer

Personal information
- Date of birth: 17 October 1931
- Place of birth: Cudworth, England
- Date of death: May 2011 (aged 79)
- Position: Wing half

Youth career
- Upton Colliery
- 1949–1951: Sheffield Wednesday

Senior career*
Years	Team	Apps	(Gls)
1951–1964	Sheffield Wednesday	170	(3)
1964–1968	Buxton		
- * Club domestic league appearances and goals

Ralph O'Donnell (17 October 1931 – May 2011) was an English professional footballer who played as a wing half.

== Career ==
Born in Cudworth, O'Donnell made 183 appearances for Sheffield Wednesday, 170 of them in the Football League. He also played non-League football for Upton Colliery and Buxton.

He died in May 2011 at the age of 79.
