= Oakenshaw railway station =

Disused railway station in West Yorkshire, England

Oakenshaw
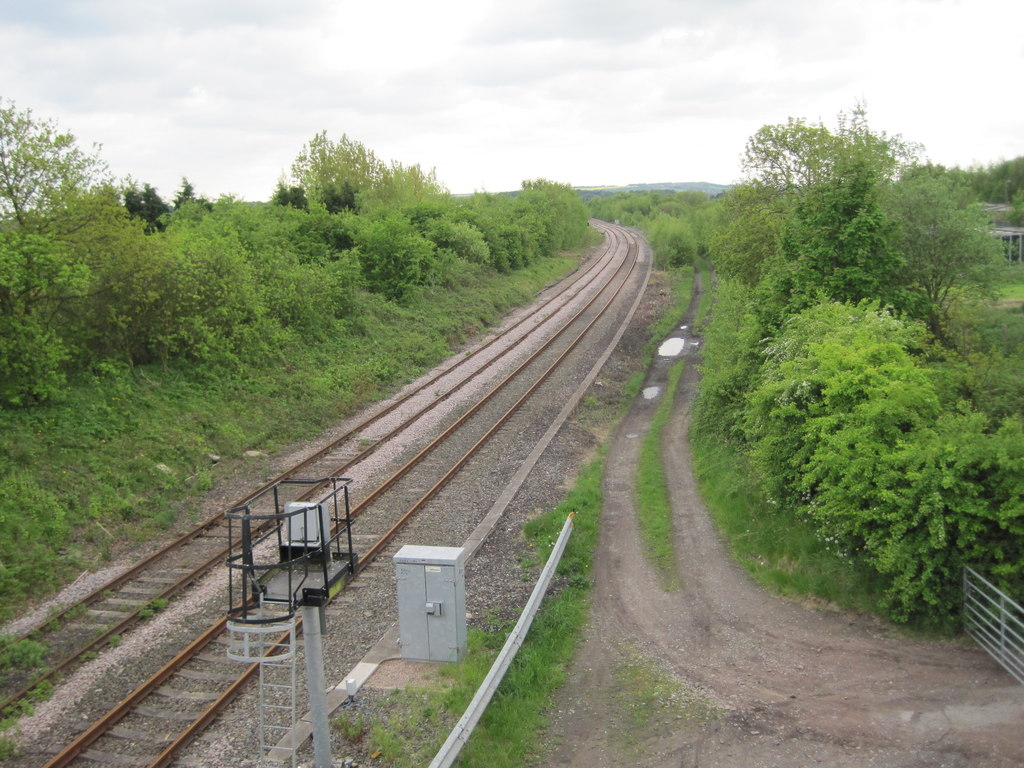
- Site of the former station in 2013

General information
- Location: Wakefield, City of Wakefield; England
- Coordinates: 53.66536°N 1.45816°W
- Grid reference: SE359189

Other information
- Status: Disused

History
- Original company: North Midland Railway
- Pre-grouping: Midland Railway

Key dates
- 1 July 1840: Station opened as Wakefield
- 1 March 1841: Renamed Oakenshaw for Wakefield
- by 1 December 1848: renamed Oakenshaw (Wakefield)
- 1 July 1861: renamed Oakenshaw
- 1 June 1870: Station closed
Location

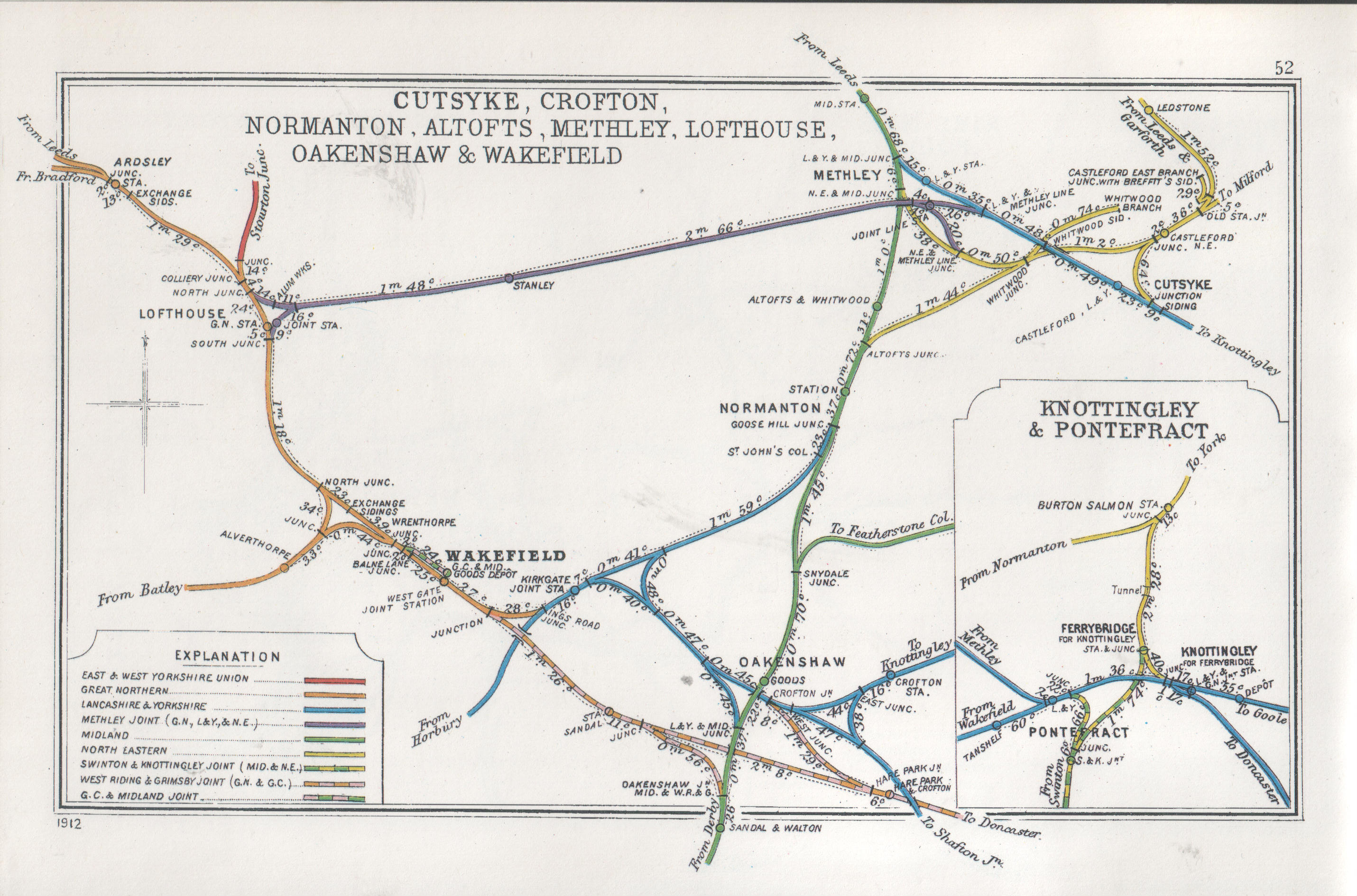
A Railway Clearing House map of lines around Oakenshaw and Wakefield in 1912

Oakenshaw railway station was located about two miles south-east of Wakefield, West Yorkshire, England. It was opened in 1840 by the North Midland Railway on its line from Derby to Leeds.

Originally built to serve Wakefield by omnibus, it had suitably ornate buildings, but was closed by the Midland Railway in 1870 when the station at Sandal and Walton was opened instead.

Preceding station	Historical railways	Following station
Sandal and Walton; Line exists; station closed	Midland Railway; North Midland Railway	Normanton; Line closed; station open
