= Architecture Without Architects =

1964 book by Bernard Rudofsky

Architecture Without Architects: A Short Introduction to Non-Pedigreed Architecture
- Cover of 1987 paperback edition
- Author: Bernard Rudofsky
- Publisher: The Museum of Modern Art (1964); University of New Mexico Press (1987)
- Pages: 130 (original)
- ISBN: 978-0-8263-1004-0 (1987 edition)

Architecture Without Architects: A Short Introduction to Non-Pedigreed Architecture is a book based on the NYC MoMA exhibition of the same name by Bernard Rudofsky originally published in 1964. It provides a demonstration of the artistic, functional, and cultural richness of vernacular architecture.

== Previous research ==
Rudofsky had long been interested in vernacular architecture. In 1931 he completed his dissertation on vernacular concrete architecture on the Greek Cyclades islands. He was convinced that modernism, but especially modern architecture got out of touch with the needs, and sensuality of mankind.

== MoMA exhibition ==
After having curated the highly controversial NYC MoMA-show Are Clothes Modern?, an exhibition where Rudofsky argued that clothing lacked utility, and - due to its highly artificial nature - even had harming effects on the human body, Rudofsky developed the exhibition Architecture Without Architects, which ran at MoMA from 11 November 1964 to 7 February 1965. In 200 enlarged black-and-white-photographs, he showed various kinds of architectures, landscapes, and people living with or within architectures. Shown without texts or explanations, the visitors were just confronted with imagery that showed indigenous building traditions, which were very much at odds with the ideas of architectural modernism which had been promoted through NYC MoMA's Philip Johnson in his famous 1932 exhibition "Modern Architecture. International Exhibition". Although the show was heavily criticised, it became one of the most successful exhibitions in the history of the NYC MoMA.

== See also ==
- Vernacular architecture
