= North Midland Railway Locomotives =

Little information remains about the North Midland Railway Locomotives. Unlike other railway companies, the North Midland Railway of England did not give names to its locomotives.

== Locomotive summary ==
=== Miller and Barnes ===
Among the first were two tender engines ordered in 1838 from Miller and Barnes of Ratcliffe which would seem to have been delivered in 1840.

=== Mather, Dixon and Company ===
The next were in 1839 from Mather, Dixon and Company, three 2-2-2 similar to the "Bury" type.

=== Various builders ===
The bulk of the purchases were in 1840 as follows:

- Benjamin Hick and Sons three 0-4-2 numbers 62, 65, 66. These were similar to two supplied in 1839 to the Liverpool and Manchester Railway.
- Fenton, Murray and Jackson six 2-2-2 Stephenson design.
- Thompson & Cole three 0-4-2

Whishaw, in 1842 writes that they were all six-wheeled, about fifty in number, and that there were, in addition, some from Robert Stephenson and Company, R and W Hawthorn and Charles Tayleur and Company. In 1841 another engine was ordered from R.B.Longridge and Company. Little is known of this, but, in 1846, the Midland Railway ordered twenty long-boilered 2-4-0s, for which it might have been a prototype. It is known that in 1842, the railway had complained about overheating of chimneys and smokeboxes, and Robert Stephenson had carried out studies with the assistance of the NMR and its Derby works which culminated in his long boiler patent. It may also be that this was 'No.54 Stephenson,' which took part in the 1845 gauge trials, along with Stephenson's 'Engine A'.

== Rolling stock ==
=== Passenger ===
Passenger coaches consisted of First, Second and Third Class, finished in Spanish Brown and lined out in Black. First Class had three compartments, each holding six people. Second Class was open at the sides, but the three compartments, each for eight people, were separated by a wooden partition. Both the buffers and the couplings were sprung by an arrangement of leaf springs under the carriage.

=== Goods ===
The railway also owned a number of goods wagons, roughly 12 foot 6 inches long, with solid buffers.
