= Sandal and Walton railway station =

Disused railway station in West Yorkshire, England

Sandal and Walton
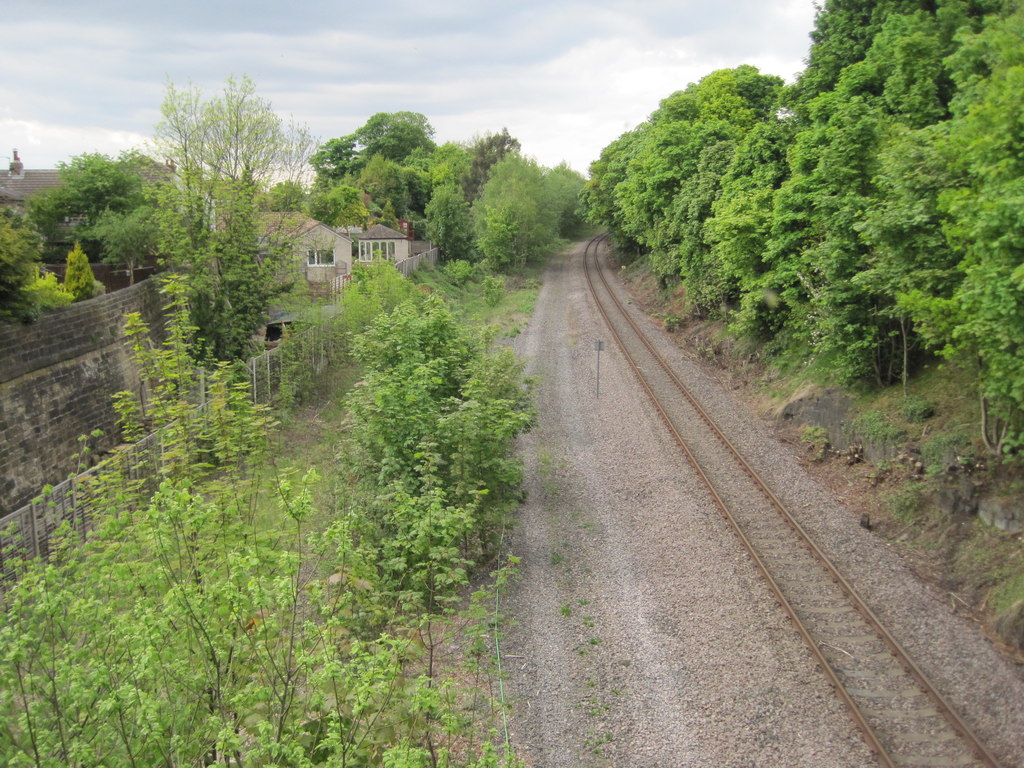
- Site of the former station in 2013

General information
- Location: Sandal and Walton, City of Wakefield; England
- Coordinates: 53.65063°N 1.46967°W
- Grid reference: SE351172
- Platforms: 2

Other information
- Status: Disused

History
- Original company: Midland Railway
- Post-grouping: London, Midland and Scottish Railway

Key dates
- 1 June 1870: Station opened
- 30 September 1951: renamed Walton
- 12 June 1961: Station closed
Location

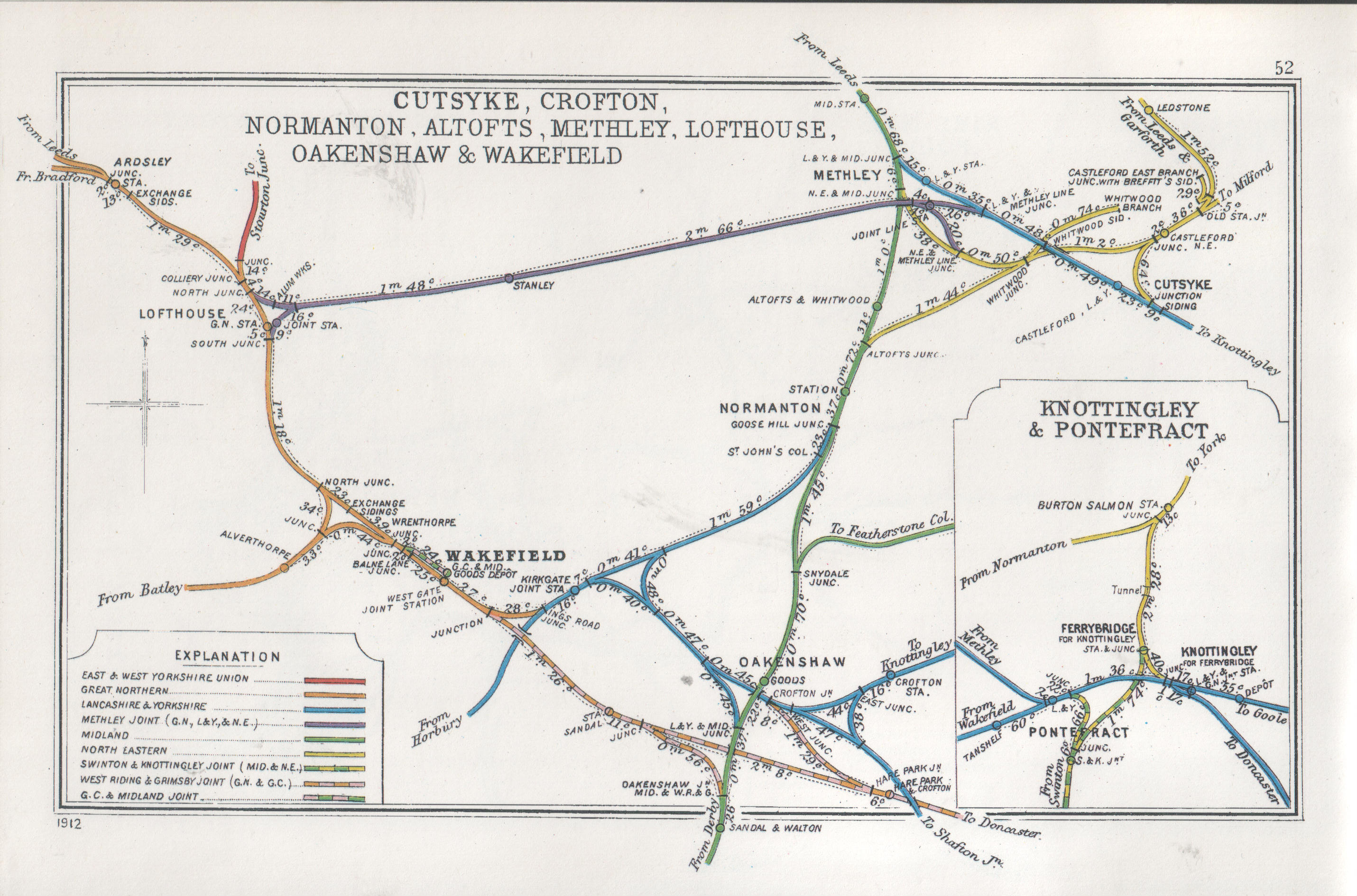
Railway Clearing House diagram showing Sandal and Walton in 1912

Sandal and Walton railway station was opened on 1 June 1870 by the Midland Railway on its line from Derby to Leeds Wellington Station.

The station was south of Wakefield, lying between Sandal and Walton in West Yorkshire, England.

It was of typical Midland brick-built construction. In 1926 the line was quadrupled, with the new goods lines passing to the east of the two platforms. It closed on 12 June 1961.

To the north of the station a junction had been built in 1868 with a curve to meet the West Riding and Grimsby Railway jointly owned by the MS&LR and the GNR. This enabled goods services and southbound passenger trains to run from Wakefield. However this service finished during the First World War.

Preceding station	Historical railways	Following station
Royston and Notton; Line exists; station closed	Midland Railway; North Midland Railway	Oakenshaw; Line exists; station closed
