= Sandalwood (disambiguation) =

Sandalwood is the common name of many species of plants and their wood and oils.

- The sandalwood family, Santalaceae, which includes:
  - True sandalwoods, of the genus Santalum, particularly several commercially harvested species that provide sandalwood timber:
    - Santalum album, white or Indian sandalwood,
    - Santalum ellipticum, coast sandalwood
    - Santalum freycinetianum, Hawaiian sandalwood
    - Santalum lanceolatum, Northern sandalwood (also Northern sandalbox)
    - Santalum spicatum, Australian sandalwood
  - Sandalwood oil, oil derived from Santalum album or Santulum spicatum
- Various unrelated plants with similarly-scented wood or oil:
  - Adenanthera pavonina, sandalwood tree; red, false red sandalwood
  - Baphia nitida, camwood, also known as African sandalwood
  - Eremophila mitchellii, sandalwood; false sandalwood (also sandalbox)
  - Myoporum platycarpum, sandalwood; false sandalwood
  - Myoporum sandwicense, bastard sandalwood; false sandalwood
  - Osyris lanceolata, African sandalwood
  - Osyris tenuifolia, east African sandalwood
  - Pterocarpus santalinus, red sandalwood

== Other uses ==
- Kannada cinema, also known as Sandalwood cinema, films known as the cinema of Karnataka
- Sandalwood, a neighborhood of Jacksonville, Florida
- Sandalwood Heights Secondary School, a public high school in Brampton, Ontario, Canada
- Sandalwood High School, a public high school in Jacksonville, Florida
- Sandalwood Island, former name of Sumba
- Sandalwood Island, former name of Vanua Levu
- Sandalwood Pony, a horse from the Indonesian islands of Sumba and Sumbawa
- Sandalwood, South Australia, a town
- USS Sandalwood (AN-32), an Aloe-class net laying ship

== See also ==
- Sandal (disambiguation)
- Chandan (disambiguation) and Chandana (disambiguation), Sanskrit word for sandalwood and also the origin of "sandal" in the name
