= Sandal (surname) =

Sandal or Sandals is a Norwegian surname. Notable people with the surname include:

- Bjørg Sandal (born 1955), Norwegian director and politician
- Christian Sandal (1872–1951), Norwegian actor and theatre director
- Liz Sandals (born 1947), Canadian politician
- Marta Sandal (1878–1930), Norwegian singer
- Mustafa Sandal (born 1970), Turkish pop music singer-songwriter, record producer
- Nils R. Sandal (born 1950), Norwegian politician
- Reidar Sandal (born 1949), Norwegian politician

== See also ==
- Sandal (disambiguation)
