= Santan =

Santan may refer to:

== Places ==
=== Arizona, United States ===
- Santan, Arizona, a CDP in Pinal County
- San Tan Valley, Arizona, a CDP in Pinal County
- Santan Freeway, a part of Loop 202 in metropolitan Phoenix
- San Tan Mountains Regional Park
- SanTan Village, an outdoor shopping mall in Gilbert, Arizona

=== Elsewhere ===
- Santan, Isle of Man, a small rural parish
- Santan (state constituency), represented in the Perlis State Legislative Assembly, Malaysia

== People ==
- Santan (rapper) (born 1998), British rapper better known as Dave

== Other uses ==
- Santan (1999 film), an Indian Bengali-language film by Anjan Choudhury
- Santan, a 1959 Indian Hindi-language film

== See also ==
- Santhanam (disambiguation)
- Santana (disambiguation)
