= Listed buildings in Cudworth, South Yorkshire =

Cudworth is a ward in the metropolitan borough of Barnsley, South Yorkshire, England. The ward contains two listed buildings that are recorded in the National Heritage List for England. Both the listed buildings are designated at Grade II, the lowest of the three grades, which is applied to "buildings of national importance and special interest". The ward contains the village of Cudworth and the surrounding area. Both the listed buildings are to the west of the village, and consist of a free-standing chimney and a guide stoop, or milestone.

== Buildings ==
| Name and location | Photograph | Date | Notes |
|---|---|---|---|
| Guide stoop 53.57997°N 1.42218°W | | Early 18th century | The guide stoop, or milestone, consists of a square post with chamfered edges. It is inscribed on two sides with the distances to Wakefield, Pontefract Road, and Penistone Road. |
| Chimney at Bleachcroft Farm; 53.57533°N 1.42576°W | | 1854 | The free-standing chimney of the former Midland Bleach Works is in sandstone. It has a square pedestal with a moulded plinth, and a cornice surmounted by a tall octagonal chimney with a datestone on the west side and an entablature. |
