= Wath North railway station =

Disused railway station in South Yorkshire, England

Wath North
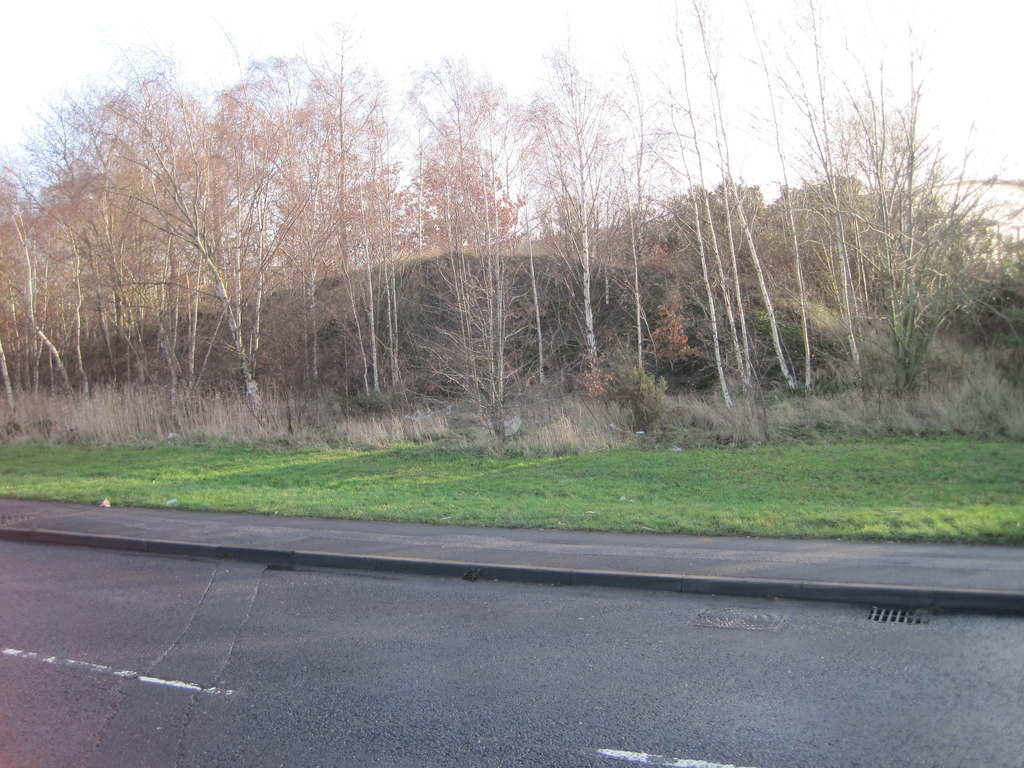
- Embankment on which the former station was located (2013)

General information
- Location: Wath-upon-Dearne, Metropolitan Borough of Rotherham; England
- Coordinates: 53.50973°N 1.33367°W
- Grid reference: SE442016
- Platforms: 2

Other information
- Status: Disused

History
- Original company: Midland Railway
- Post-grouping: London, Midland and Scottish Railway

Key dates
- 6 April 1841: Station opened as Wath
- 1 May 1850: renamed Wath and Bolton
- April 1914: renamed Wath-on-Dearne
- 25 September 1950: renamed Wath North
- 1 January 1968: Station closed
Location

Wath North railway station was on the Midland Railway's Sheffield - Cudworth - Normanton - Leeds main line, serving the town of Wath-upon-Dearne, South Yorkshire, England. The town had three railway stations, of which Wath North was the furthest from the town centre; it was three-quarters of a mile to the north, in an area of heavy industry away from residential areas, on the road to Bolton-on-Dearne.

It was built by the North Midland Railway in 1841, the year after the railway opened, and was called Wath and Bolton. It was a victim of the Beeching axe, closing on 1 January 1968 when the local Sheffield-Cudworth-Leeds passenger trains were withdrawn. Express passenger and freight trains continued to pass through the station until 1986 when the line was closed due to severe subsidence; few remains of the station were present at that time.

Preceding station	Disused railways	Following station
Swinton Town	BR Eastern Region; Sheffield-Cudworth-Leeds Line	Darfield
