= Vaidhyanathaswamy Santhanam =

Indian cotton scientist (1925–2019)

V. Santhanam
- Born: Vaidhyanathaswamy Santhanam; 31 July 1925; Tiruvarur, Tamil Nadu, India
- Died: 5 June 2019 (aged 93)
- Notable work: Plant breeding and genetics, cotton development
- Spouse: Rajammal K.
- Children: Sons:Dr.G.S.Ramachandran, S.Ravi; Daughters:Lalitha, Usha

Vaidhyanathaswamy Santhanam (31 July 1925 – 5 June 2019) was an Indian cotton scientist who worked for the Food and Agriculture Organization of the United Nations as a long-term resident expert for cotton and project leader in Myanmar. He had served as a short-term consultant to Vietnam as well. He was chairman of the expert review team of the Southern India Mills Cotton Development and Research Association from November 2009 to March 2010. He was also the author/co-author of over 110 publications, including books and book chapters on cotton.

== Education and personal life ==
Santhanam was born on 31 July 1925 at Tiruvarur in Tamil Nadu. He graduated from the Agricultural College, Coimbatore in the year 1946. He earned masters and doctorate degrees in plant breeding and genetics, from the Madras University.

He began his career at the Cotton Breeding Station of the same college before joining the Indian Council of Agricultural Research (ICAR). From 1967 to 1975, he served as the first National Coordinator for the All-India Coordinated Cotton Improvement Project. In 1975, the cotton research group he headed received the first ICAR award for team research.

Dr. Santhanam served the Food and Agriculture Organization from 1975 to 1983 as a longtime resident expert on Cotton and Project Team Leader in Myanmar. He served them as a short-term consultant (Senior Advisor) in Myanmar and Vietnam from1984 to 1987.

Santhanam died on 5 June 2019, at the age of 93.

== Scientific work ==
Introduced the concept of ideal plant type for increasing productivity and early maturity in the Indian cotton breeding program; contributed to development of Indian long staple cotton varieties. Improved agronomic practices in Burma for increasing its cotton production under the auspices of projects funded under UNDP. Dr. Santhanam's work on Cotton in Myanmar was commended by the Director General of the FAO for his "direct contribution to the 50% increase in production between the years 1975 and 1982" and placed on record his appreciation for the same.

== Important publications ==
1. Breeding procedures for cotton (1967) ICAR technical Bulletin series, no. 10.
2. Cotton (1974) Evolutionary studies in field crops, Cambridge University Press, pp. 89–100.
3. Agri-history of Cotton in India (1997) Asian Agri-history, 1:4,235-251
4. Emerging trends in conventional breeding for cotton improvement (2004) Proc. Int. Symp. UAS Dharwad/ICAR, 1–5.

== Awards and accolades ==
1. Rafi Ahmed Kidwai Memorial prize from the Indian Council of Agricultural Research (ICAR) (1967)
2. Fellow of Indian Academy of Sciences (1974).
3. Fellow of Indian Society for Cotton Improvement, Mumbai (2002)
4. Life Time Achievement Award from the University of Agricultural Sciences, Dharwad (2004)
5. Life Time Achievement Award from the Cotton Development and Research Association, Haryana (2005)
