= Cudworth, South Yorkshire =

Village in South Yorkshire, England

Coordinates: 53.5784°N 1.4149°W

Cudworth
- Shops on Barnsley Road

- Location within South Yorkshire
- Population: 10,977 (Ward 2011)
- OS grid reference: SE3809
- Metropolitan borough: Barnsley
- Metropolitan county: South Yorkshire
- Region: Yorkshire and the Humber
- Country: England
- Sovereign state: United Kingdom
- Post town: BARNSLEY
- Postcode district: S72
- Dialling code: 01226
- Police: South Yorkshire
- Fire: South Yorkshire
- Ambulance: Yorkshire
- UK Parliament: Barnsley North

Cudworth (English: /ˈkʊdɜːrθ/ KUUD-urth) is a village in the Metropolitan Borough of Barnsley in South Yorkshire, England. It had a population of 10,977 in the 2011 Census.

The modern village is part of the Cudworth ward of Barnsley Metropolitan Borough Council and has a mix of housing types with a great many developments from the inter-war and post-war periods. These supplement a small residual number of more ancient dwellings and buildings reflecting the importance of the rural economy before the opening of the deep mine collieries in the near vicinity at the end of the 19th and early 20th centuries.

The village is still surrounded by open space, including green belt, regenerated public open spaces that were formerly part of neighbouring collieries and the remaining agricultural land which still dominates the south and south-east sides of the village. Cudworth has two distinct historic centres known as Upper or Over Cudworth and Low or Nether Cudworth.

The name Cudworth derives from the Old English Cuthaworð meaning 'Cutha's enclosure'.

== Governance ==
Since the local government reforms of 1974 brought in by the Local Government Act 1972 Cudworth has been a ward within the Barnsley Metropolitan Borough Council and returns three ward councillors. This same act saw the establishment of the South Yorkshire metropolitan county, but its council was later abolished and the four constituent boroughs became unitary authorities.

Before the establishment of the poor law union, almost every aspect of local governance had been shared between three authorities; the Justices of the Peace for the West Riding in their Quarter or Special sessions; the Parish of Royston and its Vestry, and the Manor of Cudworth with its Court Baron and Court Leet.

In the period before 1900, Cudworth's governance passed through a number of changes introduced by the Government at Westminster due to the increasing population. The Public Health Act 1873 and Public Health Act 1875 created rural sanitary districts which effectively gave control of the sewers and other health matters to the local board of Guardians, who had hitherto been responsible for the workhouse and other matters relating to the Poor Laws. The Barnsley Rural Sanitary District which included most of the Barnsley Poor Law Union of which Cudworth was a part was abolished under the Local Government Act 1894 when the Barnsley Rural District Council with elected councillors took over the responsibilities previously administered by the Poor Law Guardians. The new Barnsley Rural District very quickly began to lose territory as the rapid population expansion due to the opening of the deep mine collieries created the need for the urban district councils to act as the first tier of the local authority. Cudworth was the third of the eight civil parishes within Barnsley RDC to leave when the UDC was established in 1900.

Cudworth Urban District existed between 1900 and the 1974 reforms. It had an urban district council as the second tier local authority under the West Riding County Council. The Cudworth Urban District Council was responsible for a great many changes within its boundaries including the development of a number of housing estates, including the Newtown and Birkwood estates and the much later Crown estate. In order to build the Newtown Estate it was necessary to demolish the old Manor House which previously stood on the site occupied by the houses on Lunn Road bearing the inscription commemorating the new estate in 1922.

== Transport ==
A railway station served Cudworth between 1840 and 1968. Regular bus services serve the village including service 28 to Barnsley. Most bus routes are operated by Stagecoach Yorkshire.

== Churches and places of worship ==
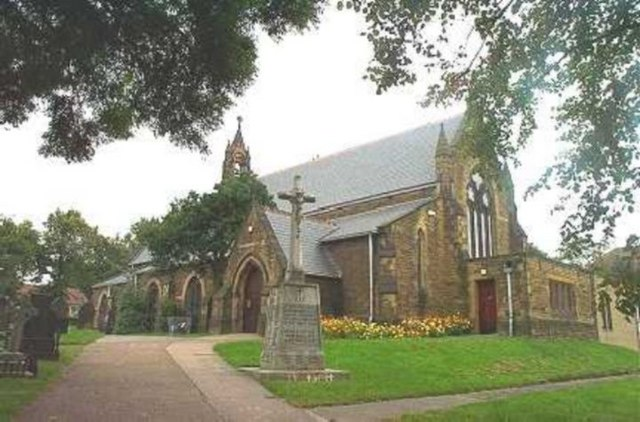
The church of St John the Baptist

Cudworth was a township and a constituent part of the large rural Anglican parish of Royston until it became part of Monk Bretton chapelry in 1843; it finally became a separate Anglican chapelry in 1893. The District Chapelries of both Monk Bretton and Cudworth later became parishes quite independent of Royston. The church dedicated to St John the Baptist was consecrated before the official commencement of the chapelry district in succession to a chapel of ease previously occupying the buildings of the charity school near the pond. St John's is situated on the High Royd, the highest part of Low Cudworth. The parish was established finally by 10 November 1893, when the Ecclesiastical Commissioners of the Church of England made a double announcement of the vicarage and curacy, with a stipend based upon two benefactions made to the Church. The Commissioners received the benefaction and promised to pay a stipend of £15 per annum and £120 per annum from it. They also set out their rights to any tithe in recompense. The Commissioners received a further benefaction, and agreed to defray the costs of the building of a parsonage in a decision dated 5 April 1900.

In 1920, a war memorial was erected in the churchyard to commemorate the servicemen of Cudworth who died in World War I; the men and women lost in World War II were added later. The Local Heritage Group organised for the memorial to be refurbished at which time more names were added, including those fallen in more recent conflicts.

St John the Baptist Cudworth is ordinarily a part of the deanery of Barnsley, Archdeaconry of Pontefract, Diocese of Wakefield and Province of York. The parish has petitioned for pastoral care by a bishop who is not a supporter of the ordination of women, currently therefore the parish is in the care of the Bishop of Pontefract, suffragan in the diocese of Wakefield.

The Roman Catholic church of St Mary Magdelene in Prospect Street was also erected to serve the growing population of miners, railway and other workers who arrived after 1890. This church is within the Deanery of Barnsley and Bishopric of Hallam and Province of Liverpool.

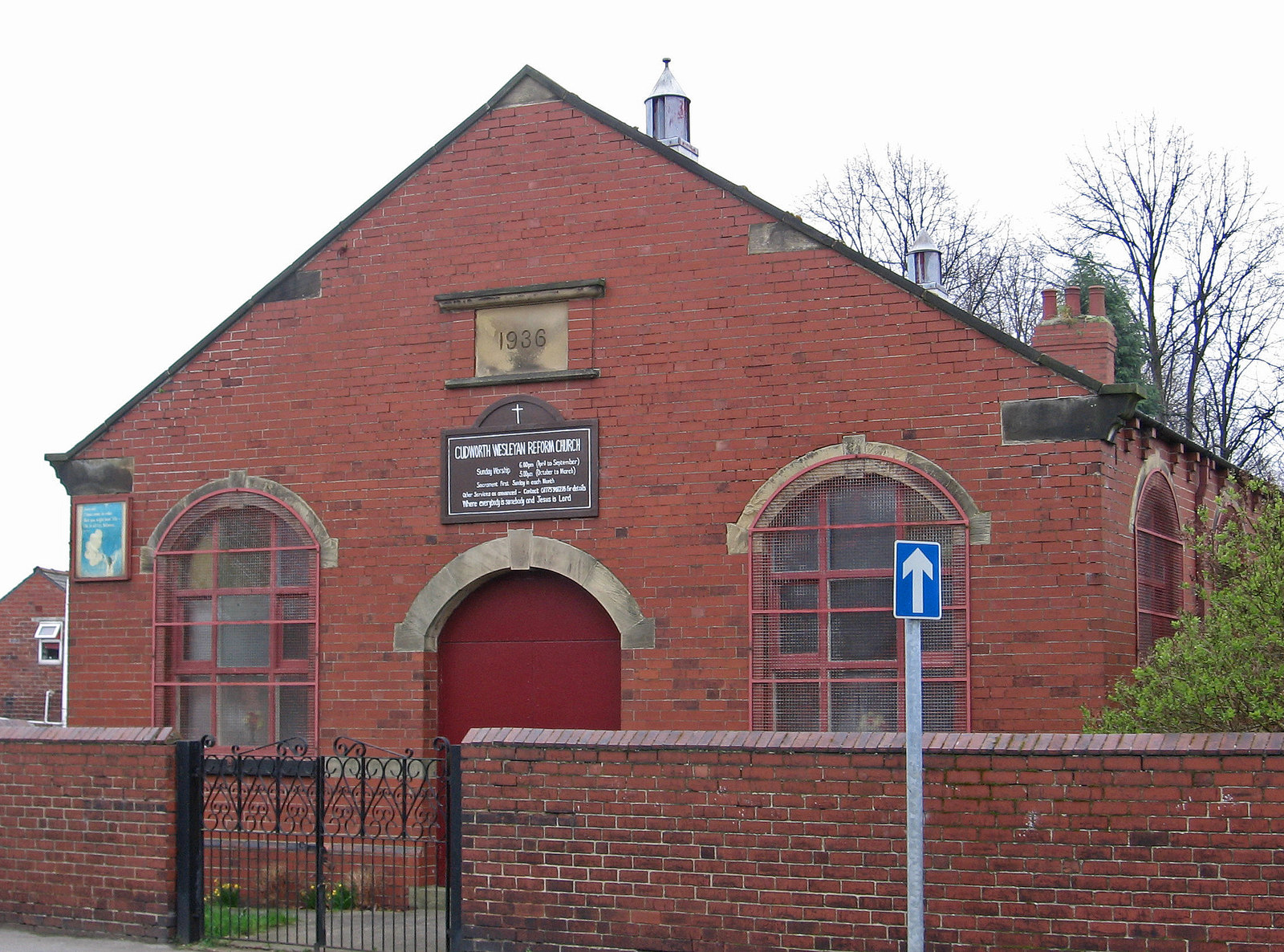
Wesleyan Reform Church in Upper Cudworth

The Methodist traditions have been strong in Cudworth since Charles and John Wesley first set out on their circuits, especially on the Sheffield circuit. The village was the birthplace of John Smith in January 1794, his parents lived in Low Cudworth. His father, William or "Billy" was a tailor and lay preacher. John was not an adherent of his father's Methodist ideas; he was reputed to have attended a prize-fight in Barnsley and was returning with his drinking companions to Cudworth when he had a Damascene moment. He was sent for training as a Methodist minister and became successful earning the epithet of "The Revivalist" and a global reputation. There are many anecdotal references to John and Charles Wesley preaching on steps alongside White Cross Road and of Charles Wesley sleeping overnight in a cottage that still stands near the slip road for Low Cudworth Green. The original Methodist chapel was on the side of the High Royd facing White Cross Road above what is today Quarry Vale.

Rev.John Smith 1794–1831

== Notable people ==
- Darren Gough (b. 1970), the Yorkshire and England cricketer, spent some of his childhood in Cudworth.
- David Hirst (b. 1967), footballer who played for Barnsley, Sheffield Wednesday and England.
- Sir Stephen Houghton, CBE, Leader of Barnsley Metropolitan Council and ward councillor in Cudworth.
- Dorothy Hyman (b. 1941), Olympic sprinter who won silver and bronze medals at the Olympic Games in the 1960s. She also captained the British women's team. She has a stadium named after her.
- Ralph O'Donnell (1931–2011), footballer who played for Sheffield Wednesday.
- Sir Michael Parkinson CBE (1935–2023), journalist and television and radio presenter.
- Archibald Stinchcombe (1912–1994), who won gold at the 1936 Winter Olympics with the Great Britain national ice hockey team.
- [(Professor Alan Hall FRS, FMedSci (1952-2015) pioneering cell biologist whose work transformed understanding of the migration of cancer cells. Chair of Cell Biology at the Memorial Sloan Kettering Cancer Center.

== Sports ==
Cudworth has been represented in the FA Cup by two football teams – Cudworth Village F.C. and Cudworth St. Mary's F.C.

The two main junior football clubs in Cudworth are Dorothy Hyman West End and Cudworth Tykes JFC. Cudworth also had one of the biggest junior football teams in Yorkshire, The Pinfold Pumas (known as pinny pumas) has teams from under 6s to under 17s, also 3 girls teams and 2 disability teams.

== See also ==
- Listed buildings in Cudworth, South Yorkshire
