= Sendal =

Type of cloth

Sendal, (also spelled cendal or sandal) is a thin and light silk material, chiefly used to make ceremonial clothing, church vestments, and banners. The word derives from Greek σινδων (sindōn), "fine linen"; the old French word is cendal. The word often describes a fabric woven of a linen warp and a silk weft.
