= Sarab-e Sandal =

Sarab-e Sandal سرابصندل
- Village
- Location within Iran
- Coordinates: 33°42′05″N 48°24′12″E
- Country: Iran
- Province: Lorestan
- County: Selseleh
- Bakhsh: Central
- Rural District: Honam

Population (2006)
  - Total: 55
- Time zone: UTC+3:30 (IRST)
  - Summer (DST): UTC+4:30 (IRDT)

Sarab-e Sandal (Persian: سرابصندل, also Romanized as Sarāb-e Şandal and Sarāb-e Sandal) is a village in Honam Rural District, located in the Central District of Selseleh County, Lorestan Province, Iran. At the 2006 census, it was home to 14 families and had a total population of 55.
