= Acharya Chandana =

Indian Jain nun (1937–2026)

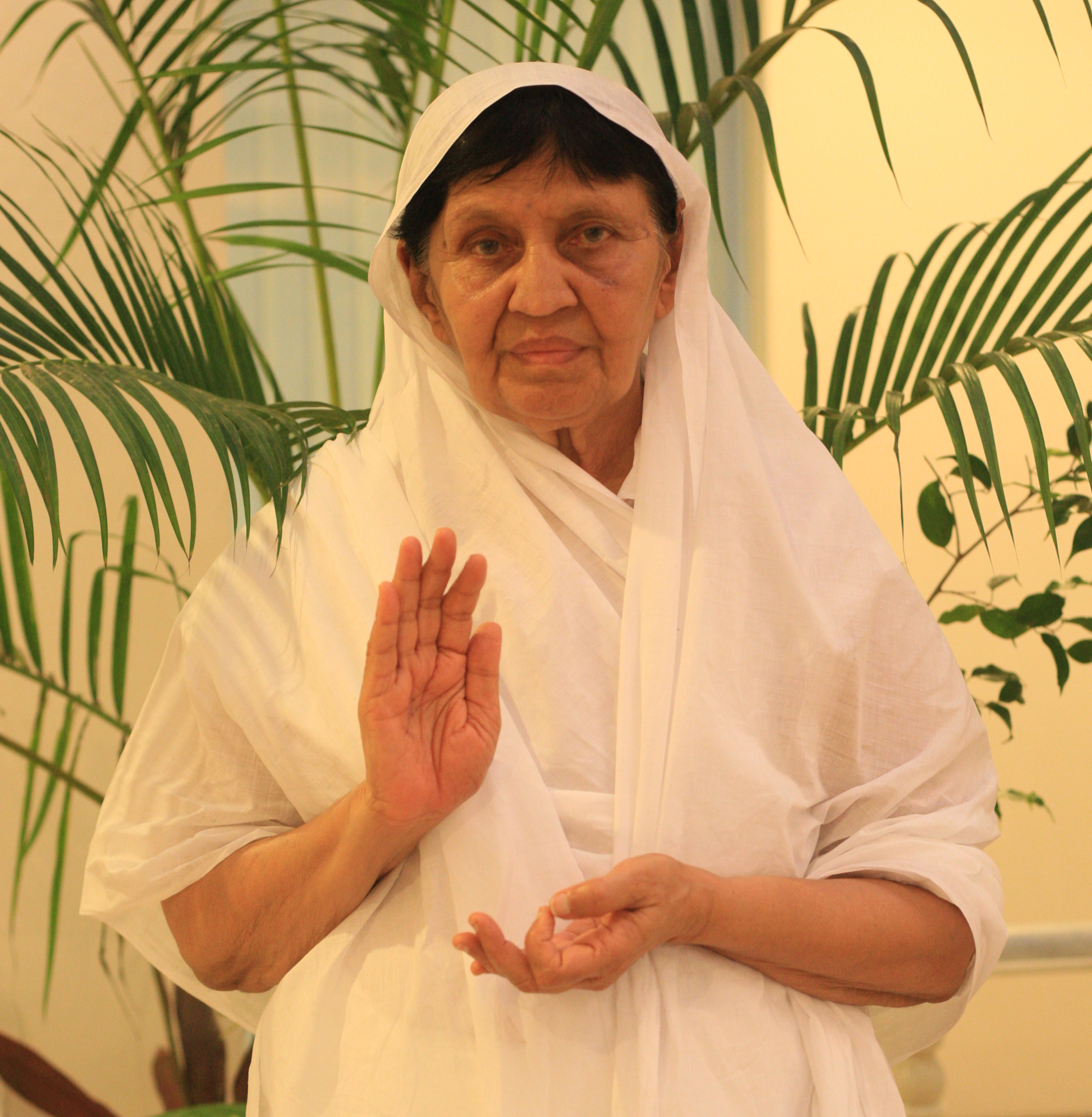

Personal life
- Born: Shakuntala; 26 January 1937 Chaskaman, Bombay Presidency, British India
- Died: 22 April 2026 (aged 89) Pune, Maharashtra, India
- Education: 'Shastri’ in the subjects of Navya-Nyaya and Vyakaran from Banaras Hindu University.
- Website: www.veerayatan.org

Religious life
- Religion: Jainism
- Initiation: Sadhvi Chandana by Pujya Gurudev Upadhyay Amar Muniji Maharaj

Acharya Chandana (born Shakuntala; 26 January 1937 – 22 April 2026), known as Tai Maharaj by her devotees, was an Indian Jain nun of the Amarmuni Sampradaya. Chandana is the first Jain sadhvi (female renunciant) to be awarded the title of Acharya and the Padma Shri. Chandana is known for her social engagement and for popularising the notion of 'seva' (human service) among the Jain community. She is the founder of Veerayatan, a non-profit, non-governmental organization based in Rajgir with centers in over ten countries.

== Early life ==
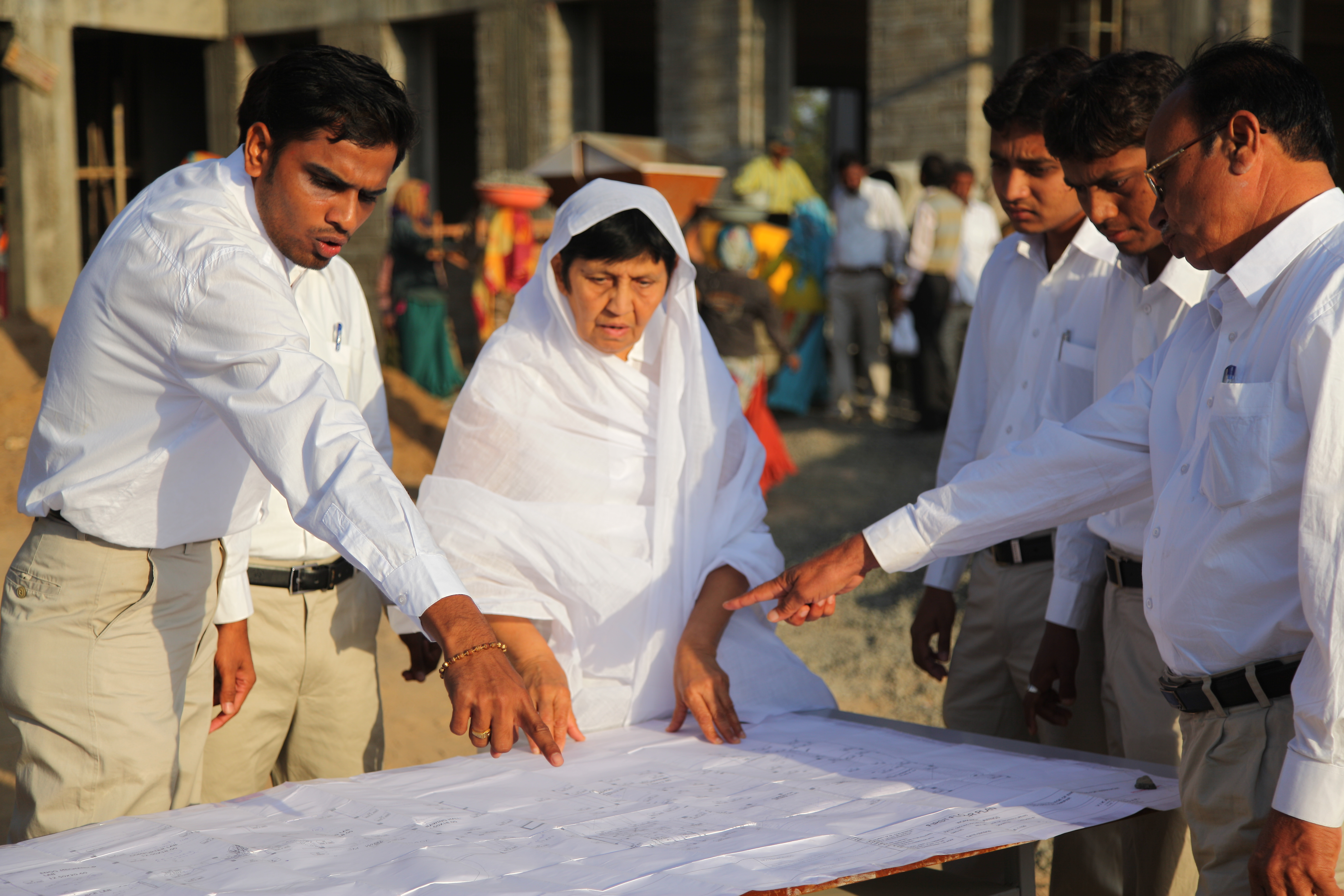
Construction of the 'Divine World' at Palitana

On 26 January 1937, Chandana was born as Shakuntala, in the Kataria family in the village of Chaskaman in the Pune district of Bombay Presidency. Her mother was Premkunwar Katariya, and her father was Manikchand Katariya. She received formal education until the third grade. From childhood, she longed to aid and serve those in need.

== Monastic life ==
Shakuntala's maternal grandfather persuaded her to be initiated as a sadhvi by Sumati Kunvar. At the age of fourteen, she received Jain diksha and was named sadhvi Chandana. She took a 12-year vow of silence to study Jain teachings, the meaning and purpose of life, and other religions. She obtained degrees of Darshan Acharya from Bhartiya Vidya Bhavan in Mumbai, Sahitya Ratna from Prayag, and a master's degree from Pathardi Dharmik Pariksha Board. Chandana received the title of Shastri from Banaras Hindu University in the fields of Navya-Nyaya and Vyakaran.

In 1968, she left the order she was initiated into and joined the lineage of Amar Muni.

In 1987, Amar Muni bestowed the rank of Acharya to Chandana. She became the first Jain sadhvi to be appointed this title, which was met with criticism from some in the Jain community.

In 1998, Chandana delivered the opening prayer at the National Federation of Asian Indians of North America convention in Cleveland, Ohio, the only known female renunciant in Jainism's history to do so. The mayor of Cleveland honored her with an award for helping to spread peace.

== Veerayatan ==
In 1973, Chandana, at the age of 36, established Veerayatan in Rajgir, under the spiritual guidance of Amarmuni. Veerayatan was founded on the occasion of Mahavira's 2500th Nirvana Mahotsav. The word "veer ayatan" is a combination of two words: "Veer" (meaning "Mahavira") and "ayatan" (meaning "sacred place"). The organization's three primary focal areas are "seva" (humanitarian service), "shiksha" (education), and "sadhana" (spiritual-development). The only Jain organization that promotes the concept of "seva" is Veerayatan. It has centres in India, United Arab Emirates, East Africa, and Singapore. At the beginning of 1990, the organisation expanded its work in the United States, the United Kingdom, and Kenya.

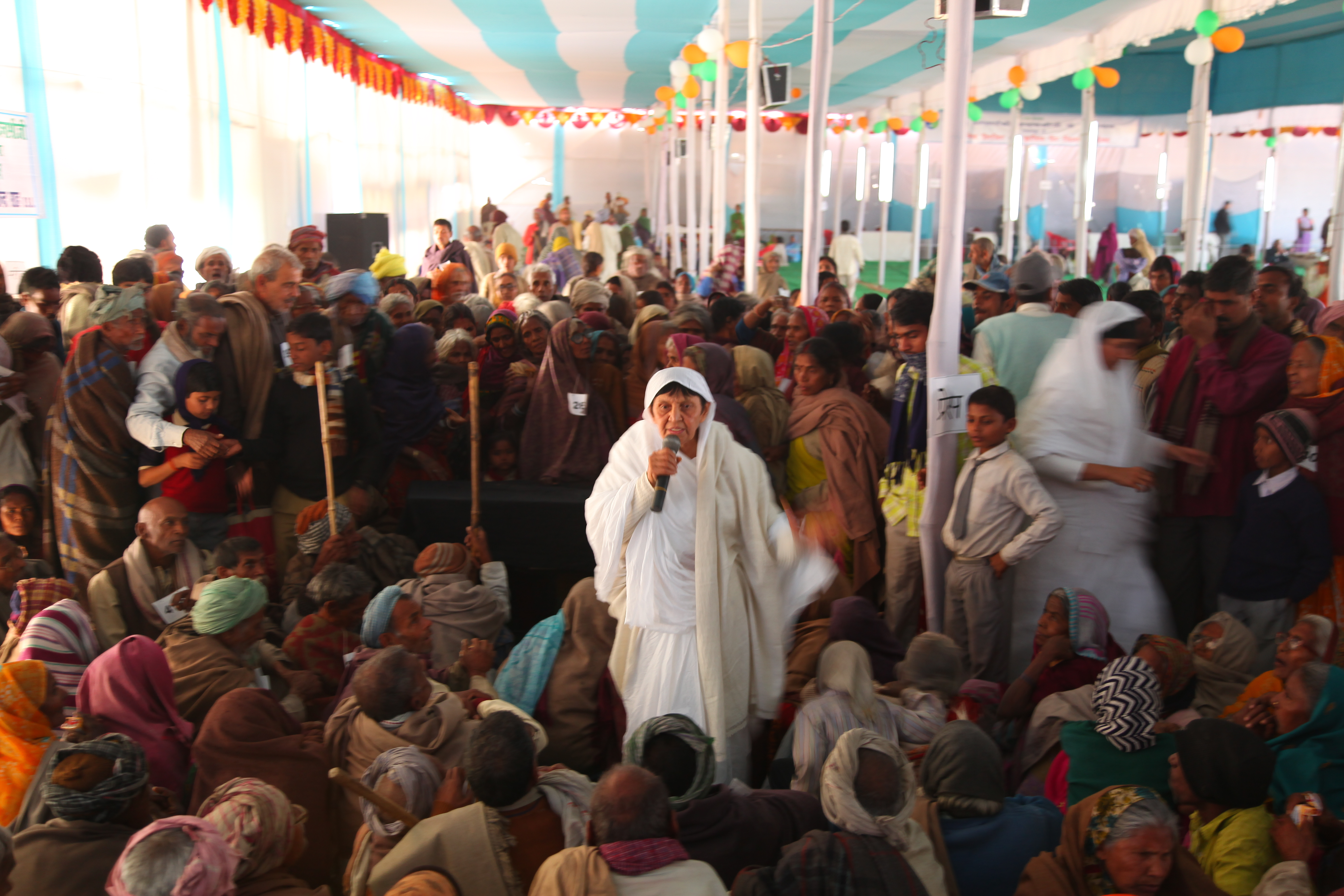
Relief Work at Veerayatan, Kutch

In 1982, Chandana was instrumental in the design and development of the Brahmi Kala Mandiram art museum. (BKM).

In 1984, Netra Jyoti Seva Mandiram (NJSM), was established to provide free eye care. Today, over 2 million patients have been treated at NJSM. Veerayatan also established free orthopedic clinics that provided free prosthetic limbs and participated in anti-polio campaigns.

The Veerayatan foundation operates schools in Lachhuar and in Pawapuri. It also operates a BEd college in Pawapuri. It operates two primary and one secondary educational institution, as well as an institute of pharmacy that offers undergraduate and graduate programs, an institute of management and computer applications that offers undergraduate programs, and an institute of engineering, management, and research that offers graduate and diploma programs in Kutch district.

Veerayatan set up emergency relief camps and programs to help people get back on their feet after the Gujarat earthquake in 2001, the tsunami in India in 2004, the Surat floods in 2006, the Kosi River floods in Bihar in 2008, and the Nepal earthquake in 2015.

== Other work ==
In 1980, Chandna assisted in the establishment of a museum at the Leicester Jain Centre in the United Kingdom.

She was also a member of Selection Jury of Mahaveer Awards presented by Bhagwan Mahaveer Foundation, Chennai.

== Death ==
Chandana died on 22 April 2026, at the age of 89.

== Recognition and awards ==
- On 26 January 2022, Chandana was awarded Padma Shri Award, the fourth-highest civilian award by the Indian government, for her contribution to humanitarian service and social work.
- On 5 September 2002, she was awarded Shri Devi Ahilya National Award by the central minister, Smt. Sumitra Mahajan for her services to humanity in the fields of health, education, population, pollution control, and natural disasters through Veerayatan.
- JAINA Presidential Award was presented for Veerayatan's service in extending Mahavir's work to all through compassion, education, and nonviolence.
