= Bernard Rudofsky =

Austro-American architect

- Born: April 1905; Suchdol nad Odrou, Moravia, Austro-Hungarian Empire
- Died: March 12, 1988 (aged 82)
- Occupation: Architect

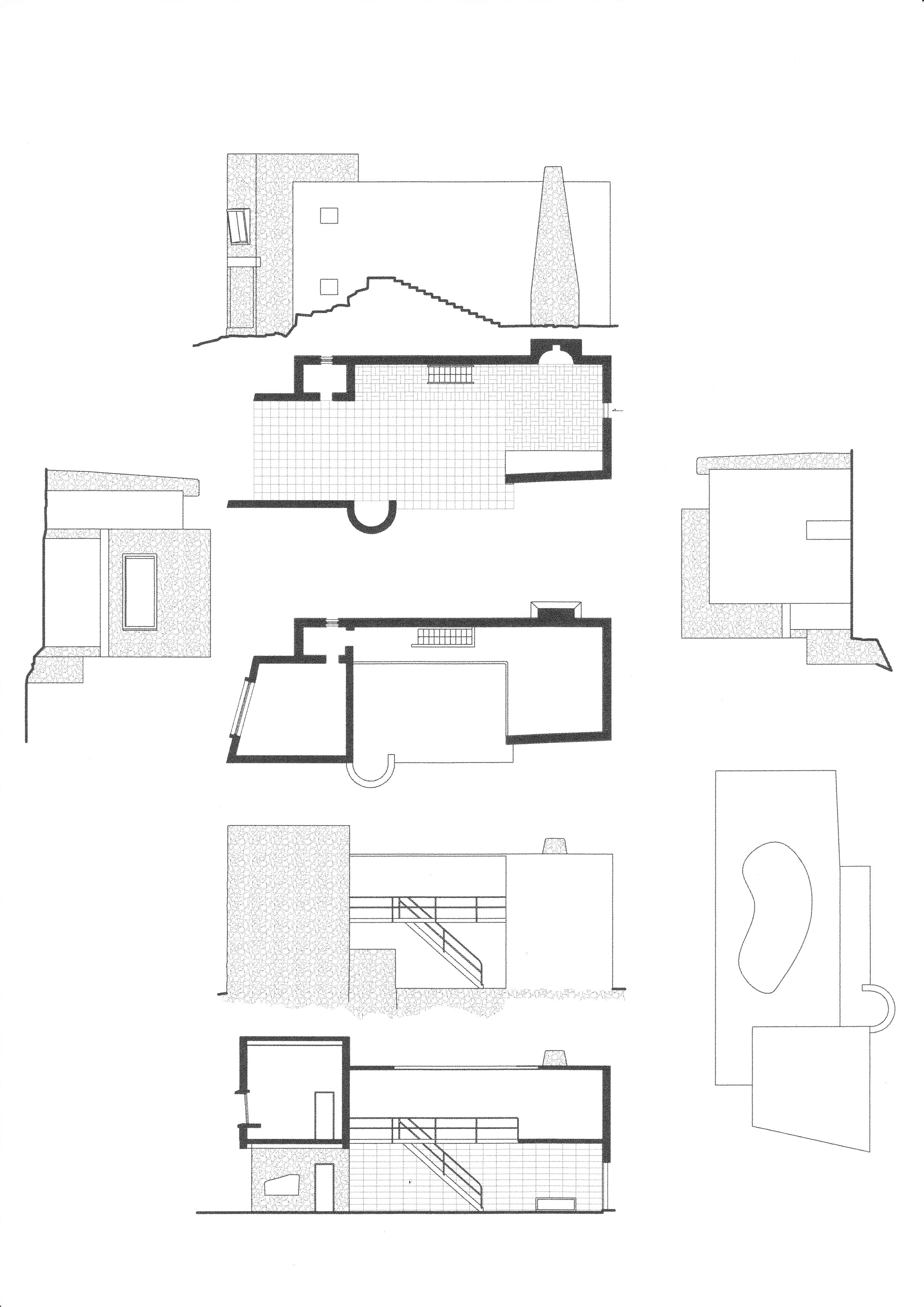
Villa in Positano

Bernard Rudofsky (April 1905 – March 12, 1988) was an Austrian American writer, architect, collector, teacher, designer, and social historian. His most notable work is Architecture Without Architects: A Short Introduction to Non-pedigreed Architecture, published in 1964. Ada Louise Huxtable called him “the master iconoclast of the modern movement."

== Education and teaching ==
Rudofsky earned a doctorate in architecture in Austria before working in Germany, Italy, and a dozen other countries. He temporarily settled in Brazil in the 1930s and opened an architectural practice there, building several notable residences in São Paulo. An entry in a 1941 design competition brought an invitation from MoMA to tour the US; in the wake of Pearl Harbor, as an Austrian native, he was given the option of staying in the US. He remained based in New York City until his death, although he continued to travel (sometimes for years at a stretch). Rudofsky variously taught at Yale, MIT, Cooper-Hewitt, Waseda University in Tokyo, and the Royal Academy of Fine Arts in Copenhagen. He was a Ford, Fulbright and Guggenheim Fellow.

== Influence ==
Rudofsky was most influential for organizing a series of controversial MoMA exhibits in the 1940s, 1950s and 1960s. He is best remembered today for a number of urbane books that still provide relevant design insight that is concealed in entertaining, subversive sarcasm. His interests ranged from vernacular architecture to Japanese toilets and sandal design. Taken together, his written work constitutes a sustained argument for humane and sensible design.

=== Publications and books ===
In Architecture without Architects Rudofsky states that "Architectural History, as written and taught in the Western World, has never been concerned with more than a few select cultures." He attempts to break down our limited idea of this field and briefly introduce the reader to the vast and wise world of 'nonpedigreed architecture' (vernacular, indigenous, and often anonymous). The lessons taught in this world are highly useful to mankind, especially relating to the environmental crisis the world now faces.

Another notable work, Now I Lay Me Down to Eat is an entertaining tour of historical and cultural alternatives to the design problems of everyday life—dining, sleeping, sitting, cleansing, and bathing—and was "neither meant to spread dangerous heresies nor to undermine our birthright to make the worst of possible choices. Rather, it demonstrates by means of random examples that life can be less dull than we make it." By contrasting current western design solutions with earlier practices, he makes our current "solutions" look open to improvement, if not outright ridiculous and arbitrary. For instance, he asks why the standard American-style toilet is effectively a septic humidifier, and why American-style bathtubs are impossible for adults to lie down in and are as a matter of routine permanently fixed two or three feet away from a septic humidifier.

In 1944 Rudofsky and his wife Berta were invited to Black Mountain College for two weeks. Bernard gave two lectures on the sad state of clothing design, calling contemporary dress "anachronistic, irrational, impractical and harmful" and literally unsuitable. One of his lectures was called "How Can People Expect to Have Good Architecture When They Wear Such Clothes?". Berta was convinced to organize an impromptu course on sandalmaking. Berta was invited back the following year, and their successful venture Bernardo Sandals was organized in 1947 and still thrives.

In 1986, the architecture magazine "UMRISS" dedicated a special issue (1/86) to Bernard Rudofsky under the title "Return to living" / "Umkehr zum Wohnen" in addition to a comprehensive presentation of Rudofsky's key architecture projects.

== Major works ==
- Are Clothes Modern? (1947)
- Behind the Picture Window (1955)
- Japan: Book Design Yesterday (1962)
- Architecture Without Architects: A Short Introduction to Non-pedigreed Architecture (1964)
- The Kimono Mind: An Informal Guide to Japan and the Japanese (Charles E. Tuttle, 1965)
- Streets for People: A Primer for Americans (1969)
- The Unfashionable Human Body (1971)
- The Prodigious Builders: Notes Toward a Natural History of Architecture with Special Regard to those Species that are Traditionally Neglected or Downright Ignored (1977)
- Now I Lay Me Down to Eat: Notes and Footnotes on the Lost Art of Living (1980)
- Sparta/Sybaris (1987), edited by Peter Noever/MAK

== Publications by other authors on Rudofsky's work ==
- Bernard Rudofsky: A Humane Designer (2003), Guarneri, Andrea Bocco, Springer-Verlag, Wien, ISBN 3-211-83719-1
- Lessons from Bernard Rudofsky: Life As A Voyage (2007), edited by Platzer, Monika, Birkhauser Verlag AG, Basel, Switzerland, ISBN 978-3-7643-8360-2
- Bernard Rudofsky Architect (2016), Rossi, Ugo, Clean Edizioni, Napoli, ISBN 978-88-8497-527-0

== Exhibitions ==
- Sparta/Sybaris. Keine neue Bauweise. Eine neue Lebensweise tut not. curated by Peter Noever/MAK, 1987/88
