= Cudworth railway station =

Disused railway station in South Yorkshire, England

Cudworth
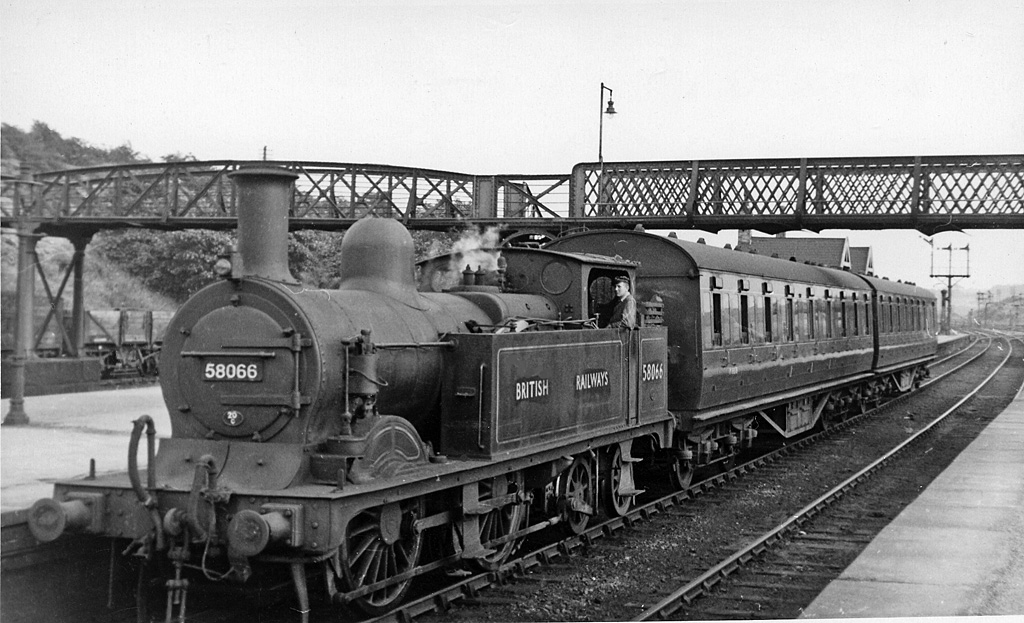
- Push-and-pull from Barnsley in 1951

General information
- Location: Cudworth, Barnsley; England
- Coordinates: 53.56894°N 1.42273°W
- Grid reference: SE383081
- Platforms: 5

Other information
- Status: Disused

History
- Original company: North Midland Railway
- Pre-grouping: Midland Railway
- Post-grouping: London, Midland and Scottish Railway

Key dates
- 1 July 1840: Station opened as Barnsley
- 1 August 1854: renamed Cudworth for Barnsley
- circa 1854: new station
- 1 May 1870: renamed Cudworth
- 1 January 1968: Station closed
Location

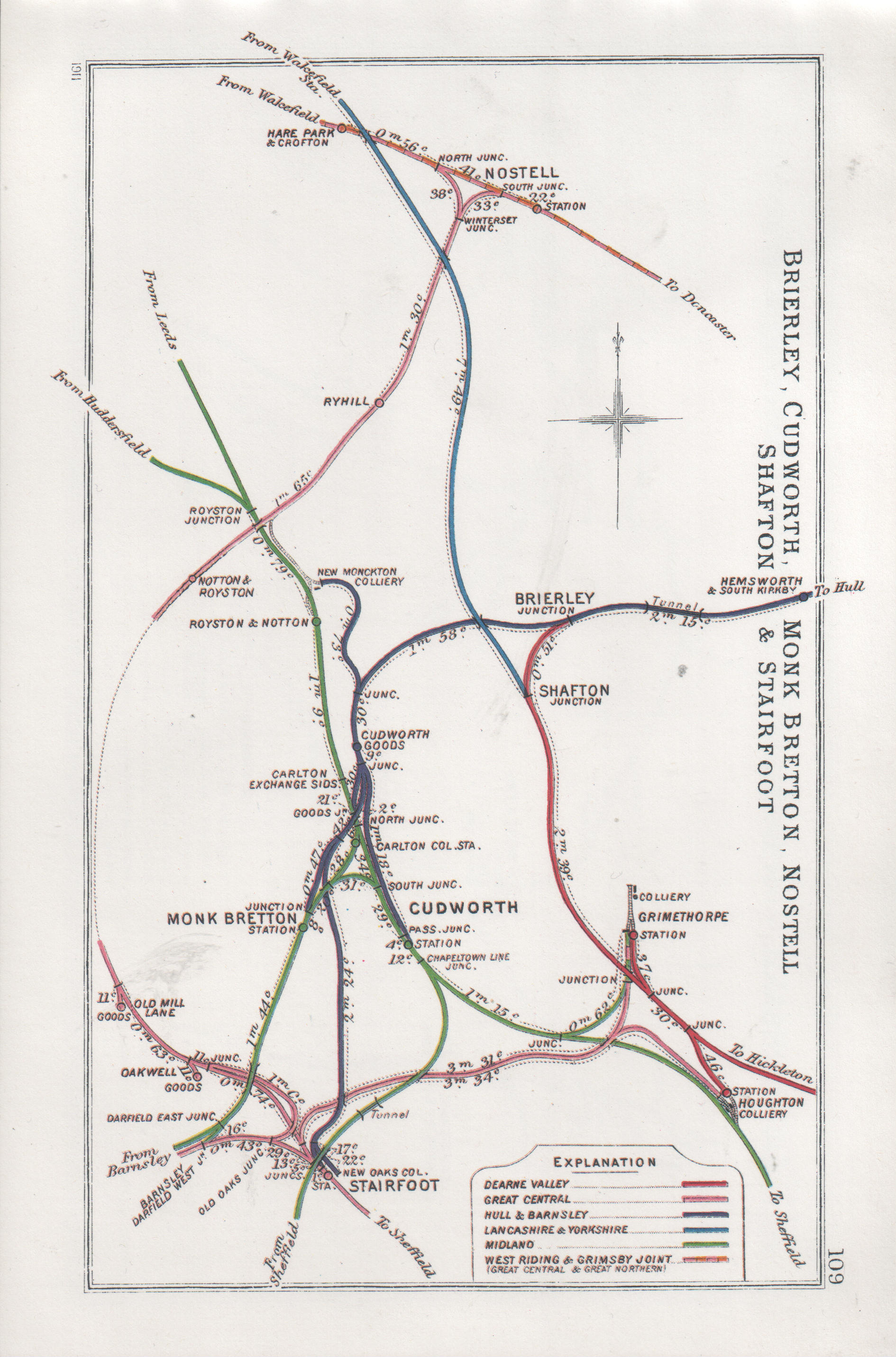
Railway Clearing House diagram of lines around Cudworth in 1911

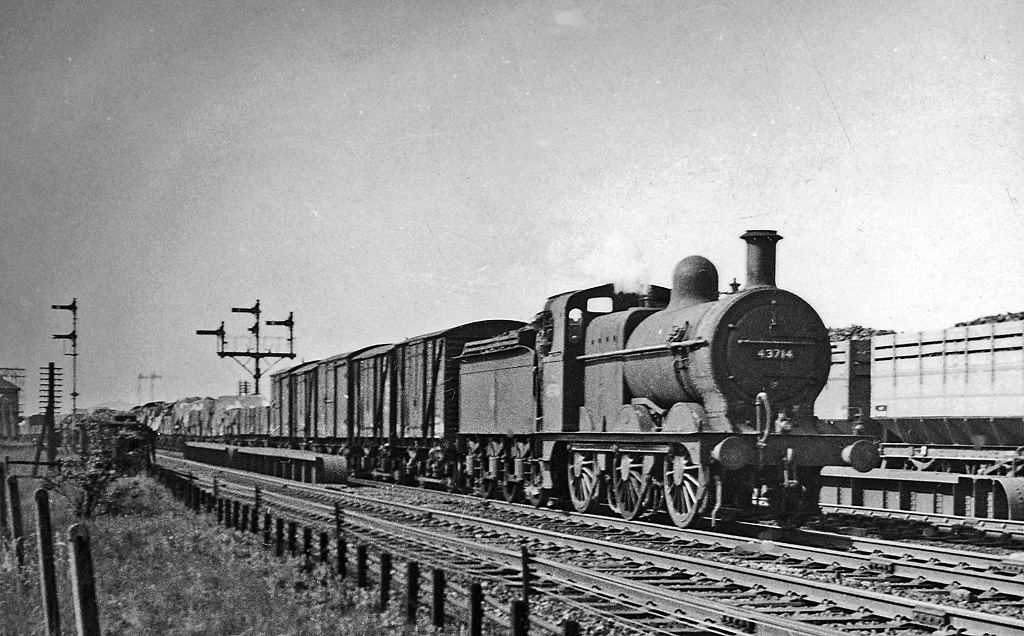
The Midland main lines at Wath Road Junction in 1957

Cudworth railway station (English: /ˈkʊdɜːrθ/) was a railway station that served Cudworth, South Yorkshire, England.

== History ==
The station was built by the North Midland Railway and opened in 1840. It was originally called Barnsley and is referred to in Allens Guide as Barnsley Station at Cudworth Bridge. – Omnibus to Barnsley 2 1/2 miles on the left.

Roughly 2 miles (3.2 km) further north, was the line's first crossing of the Barnsley Canal.

In 1885 the station was extended with an extra platform for the Hull and Barnsley Railway, which passed through but was not connected to the Midland system until the next century.

The station closed to passengers in 1968. In 1988 the line from Wath Road Junction to Cudworth was closed due to mining subsidence.

== Accidents and incidents ==
- In 1843 a North Midland Railway luggage train collided with the rear of a stationary train in fog.
- On 19 January 1905, once again in fog, a Midland Railway express passenger train overran signals and collided with a passenger train. Seven people were killed.

Preceding station	Historical railways	Following station
Darfield; Line closed; station closed	Midland Railway; North Midland Railway	Royston and Notton; Line closed; station closed
