= Chandon (name) =

Chandon is a given name and surname. Notable people with the name include:

== Surname ==
- Alex Chandon (born 1968), film director, writer and digital artist
- Edmée Chandon (1885–1944), French astronomer
- Olivier Chandon de Brailles (1955–1983), French race car driver

== Given name ==
- Chandon Sullivan (born 1996), American football player
- Chandon Roy (born 2007), Bangladeshi football player
