= Bernardo Sandals =

Bernardo Sandals was founded in 1946 by architect Bernard Rudofsky and Berta Rudofsky. The Rudofskys went into sandal design following the 1944 exhibition, "Are Clothes Modern?" that Mr. Rudofsky curated at the Museum of Modern Art in New York City.

== Description ==
The core ideas of the designs were those Bertha taught at Black Mountain College. Monika Platzer writes, in the book Lessons from Bernard Rudofsky, "In contrast to closed footwear, which he condemned as "foot-deformers," Rudofsky preached the virtues of sandals as "non-concealing footwear; they represented a suitable type of shoe, one that transcended conventionality and ever-changing fashions."

The first collection was presented at the Ritz Carlton Hotel in Manhattan, and featured only 6 designs. All six designs consisted of strappy uppers on an asymmetrical leather sole that was pancake flat. The collection was immediately successful, and in the 1950s and 1960s high-end fashion magazines such as Vogue and Harper's Bazaar regularly featured Bernardo sandals in fashion editorials. By the 1960s Jackie Kennedy was said to own 16 colors of the same pair. The current Bernardo sandal line includes several of Rudofsky's original designs and are handmade in Brazil.

== Growth ==
In 1953, Dino Sonnino bought Bernardo Sandals from Aldo Bruzzichelli, the co-founder (with Bernard Rudofsky) and owner of Bernardo Sandals. Rudofsky remained as designer of Bernardo Sandals for one more year, then returned to Italy to pursue his profession as architect. His time with Bernardo was always intended as temporary, until such time that the war-devastated Italian economy would start recovering and provide work for architects. Upon Rudofsky's departure to Italy, Dino Sonnino needed a new designer for Bernardo Sandals, at the time a tiny business with a small factory in New York City, on Walker Street in Tribeca. There were only four employees, with all production made at the Walker Street factory (the building still exists, having become residential with loft apartments). Dino Sonnino's wife, Eva Sonnino, who grew up in Milan, Italy and had a strong sense of fashion, became the temporary designer, until a new designer was found. But Eva Sonnino immediately proved herself to be a successful designer for Bernardo Sandals, and the job was hers permanently.

It was under the management of Dino Sonnino and the design of Eva Sonnino that Bernardo grew from a tiny, unknown manufacturer of women's sandals to the best known sandal company in the United States. Eva Sonnino won the Neiman Marcus award for best women's shoe designer in 1967, and was constantly asked by Vogue and Harpers Bazaar to create special designs for their editorials, including one in conjunction with the James Bond movie "Goldfinger", gold-colored sandals worn by a model covered in gold body paint. In 1967 Eva Sonnino was asked by Kay Hayes, the Vogue shoe editor, to create a sandal with straps going up to the knee for a Vogue editorial. She responded by saying she would create a sandal with straps going up to the hip which she fitted on the top model Verushka. Kay Hayes liked it so much that she ordered a white leather pair for a NYC broadcast TV show with Tippy Hedren (the star of Alfred Hitchcock's movie "The Birds") modeling the sandal. Dino and Eva helped Tippy strap up the sandals and were interviewed on the show with Tippy. Bernardo's became a sort of cult fashion item, even with college girls, as documented by 'The Official Preppy Handbook", at the time an arbiter of college youth fashion.

== Special collections ==
By the mid to late sixties, Eva Sonnino was designing special collections for Emilio Pucci evening wear. Emilio Pucci was so enthusiastic about her designs and Dino Sonnino's business leadership, that he invited them to move their headquarters next to his compound outside Florence, Italy, in the Tuscan countryside, all at his expense. He was going to provide a villa and design facilities for Bernardo, wishing to benefit from the creative synergies to expand into accessories such as hand bags. The invitation was tempting, but the Sonnino's decided they didn't want to leave their simple life in New York City for a glamorous one in Florence which would have involved a hectic social life.

By the mid 1960s, Bernardo Sandals were no longer made just in New York City (the tiny Walker Street factory having been moved to a large full floor space on East 22nd Street between Broadway and Park Avenue South/4th Avenue, the building having been converted to loft apartments in the late 1970s). Manufacturing remained in New York City, but was augmented by factories in upstate New York, Italy, and Spain. Additional factories in Mexico and Brazil were being contemplated in the late 1960s. At that time, Dino and Eva Sonnino were both in their late 50s and thinking about their retirement years. They asked their son, Edward Sonnino (who had worked two summers at the firm after graduating from high school, had visited various factories in Italy with his parents over the years during summer vacation, and met the most important buyers and Bernardo sales persons in the U.S.) whether he would be interested in joining the firm after graduating from college and eventually taking over from his parents. He declined because he did not yet have a feel for fashion and therefore lacked the confidence necessary to successfully lead a high fashion business. He also was not interested in business at that young age.

== Company sold ==
Consequently, Dino and Eva Sonnino decided to find a buyer for their company. Revlon, the world's leading cosmetics company at the time, made the highest offer, but only payable in restricted Revlon stock. R.G. Barry, listed on the American Stock Exchange, a manufacturer of machine washable slippers with well-known brands such as "DearFoams", ended up acquiring Bernardo, thinking it could transform a relatively low-volume high-fashion company into a high volume one. Under R.G Barry, Bernardo started a decline, no longer having top management with competency in the high fashion business. R.G. Barry underestimated the need for a top designer and for public relations and advertising at the highest level. They underestimated the importance of having a tight rapport with Vogue and Harpers Bazaar, which led to countless high-impact editorials which strengthened the Bernardo brand and increased visibility.

To this day, Eva Sonnino's designs remain emblematic of Bernardo Sandals. They remain Bernardo's most successful designs. Starting in the mid 1960s, all Vogue and Harpers Bazaar ads for Bernardo Sandals credited Eva Sonnino as being the designer. While her designs were essential for Bernardo's success, so were the management talents of her husband, Dino Sonnino, who in the early years was Bernardo's top salesman, being the only one, traveling around the country, knocking on doors of department store buyers and independent shoe stores, often not getting a moment's attention but not letting himself be discouraged. Beyond his management talent, his perseverance, courage, and determination were essential to raise the company from being unknown to a fashion icon. Eva and Dino Sonnino were quite a husband and wife team, creating a successful high fashion company practically from scratch in less than fifteen years. Had Bernardo Sandals been sold to a company understanding how to operate in the high fashion sector back in the late 1960s when it was by far the leading brand in women's sandals, it would most probably be a leader today in women's high fashion shoes and accessories.

== 1990 ==
By 1990 the Bernardo Footwear line was downgraded in price and quality. Owned by the Slaughter Brothers of Dallas, Texas, the sandals were 100% man-made materials, production was switched to China, and the retail price range was $25 to $35. 1993 was officially the last year under the Slaughter Brother's ownership, as they officially stopped selling the brand and closed it down.

Texan retailer Roy Smith teamed up with designer Dennis Comeau of Florence, Italy, who resigned from Prada to acquire the rights to the brand in 2001. Restructuring and relaunching the brand, they went back to making a high-quality all leather product, manufacturing in Italy, and raised the retail prices to the $100 plus market. Within a few years Bernardo was once again carried by high-end stores such as Neiman Marcus, Bloomingdales, Harrods and Fred Segal. The sandals were frequently sighted and photographed by many big-name celebrities, such as Reese Witherspoon, Hilary Duff, Vanessa Manillo, Jessica Alba, Ruby Spiro, Robin Wright, and Halle Berry.

In 2009 Comeau launched a subdivision labeled "Bernardo Vintage Couture". With prices ranging from $250 to $600, the new line was bought by very high end retailers worldwide, such as Dover Street Market in London, Jeffrey and Bergdorf Goodman in New York, 10 Corso Como in Milan, and Harvey Nichols in the UK and Asia.

== 2011 ==
In 2011, Bernardo Footwear was sold to a group of investors headed by Peter Cooper. Cooper engaged in an important re-branding of Bernardo, creating the brand identity and loop logo used on Bernardo shoes today. Cooper also successfully created the Bernardo 1946 brand which re-introduced Italian-made heritage styles from the 1950s and 1960s. In 2014, a majority of the Bernardo assets were sold to a group led by Peter Grueterich, previous owner of Bruno Magli and founder of the Peter Marcus Group, which specializes in luxury footwear distribution.

== Gallery ==
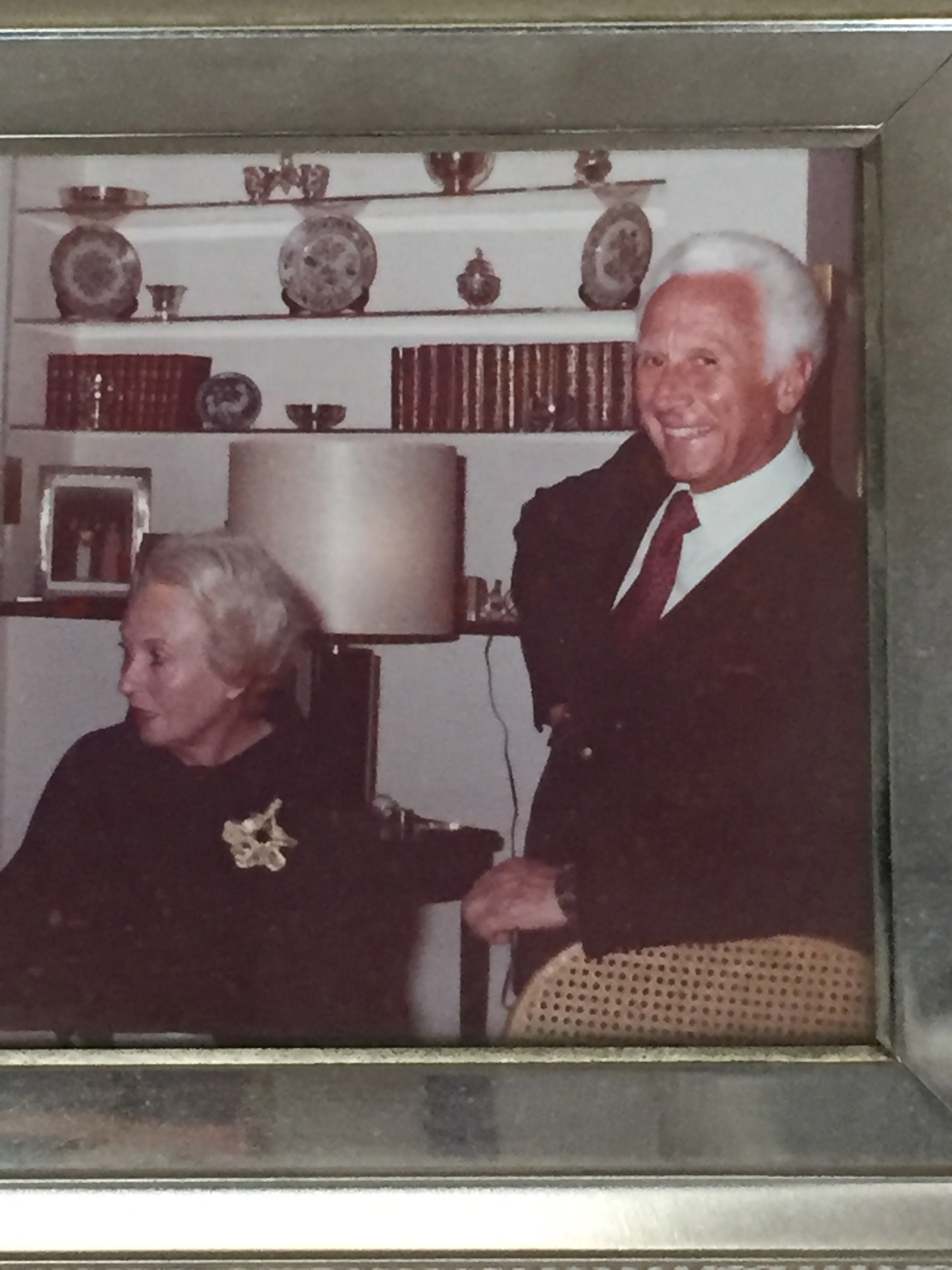
Eva Sonnino and Dino Sonnino

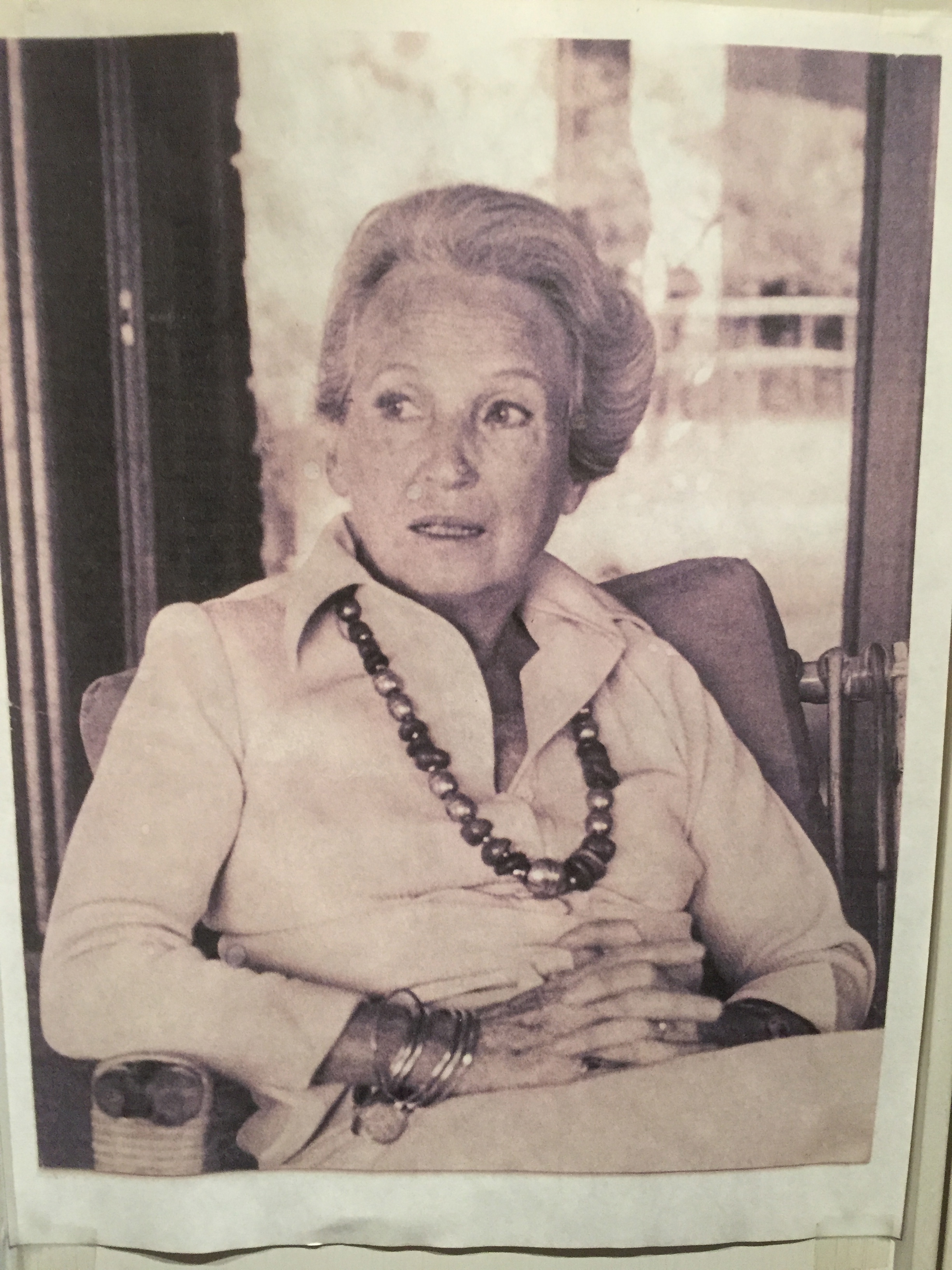
Eva Sonnino, Designer, Bernardo Sandals 1954-1970

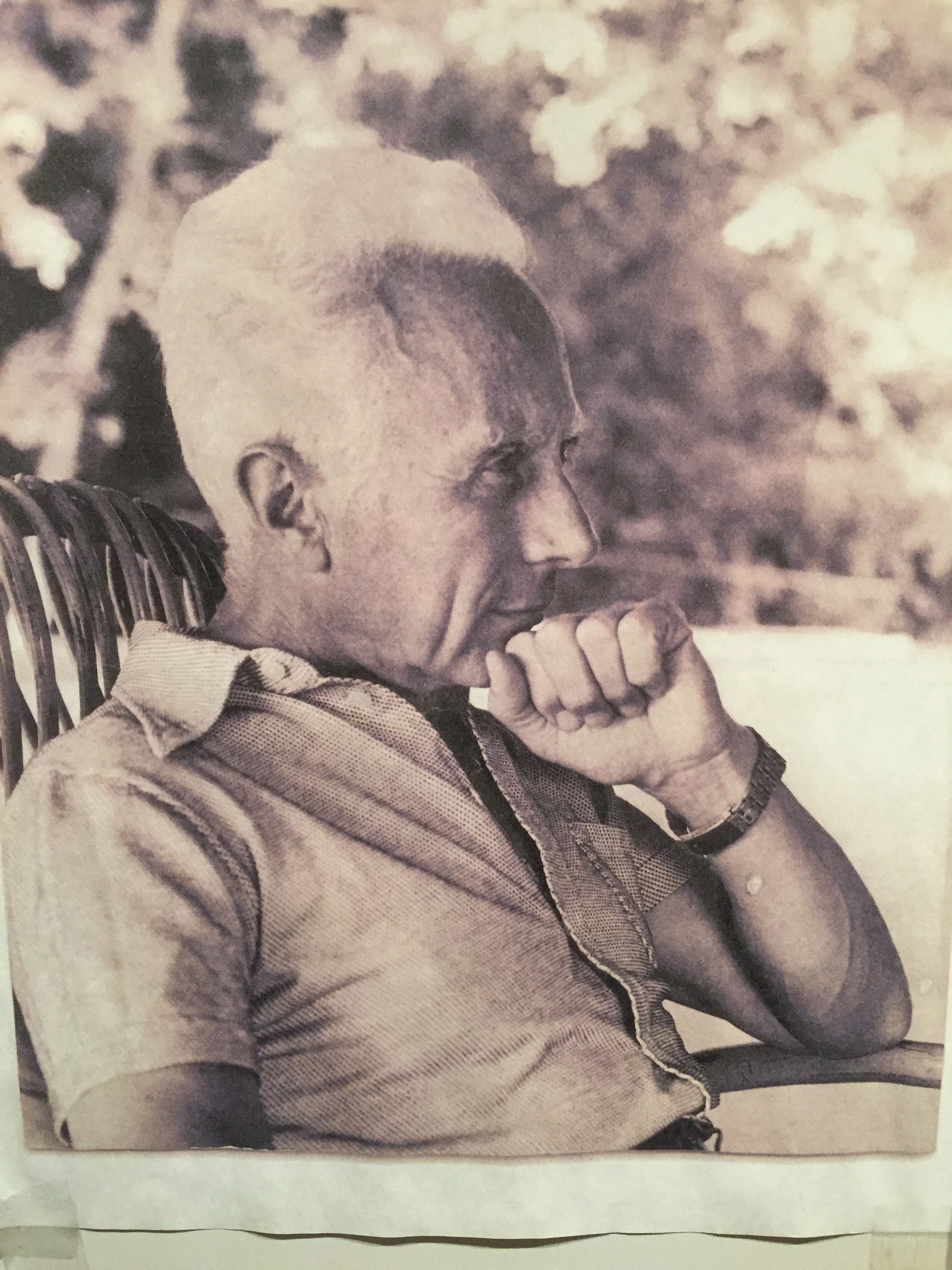
Dino Sonnino, President, Bernardo Sandals 1954-1970
