= North Midland Railway =

Early British railway company (1840–1844)

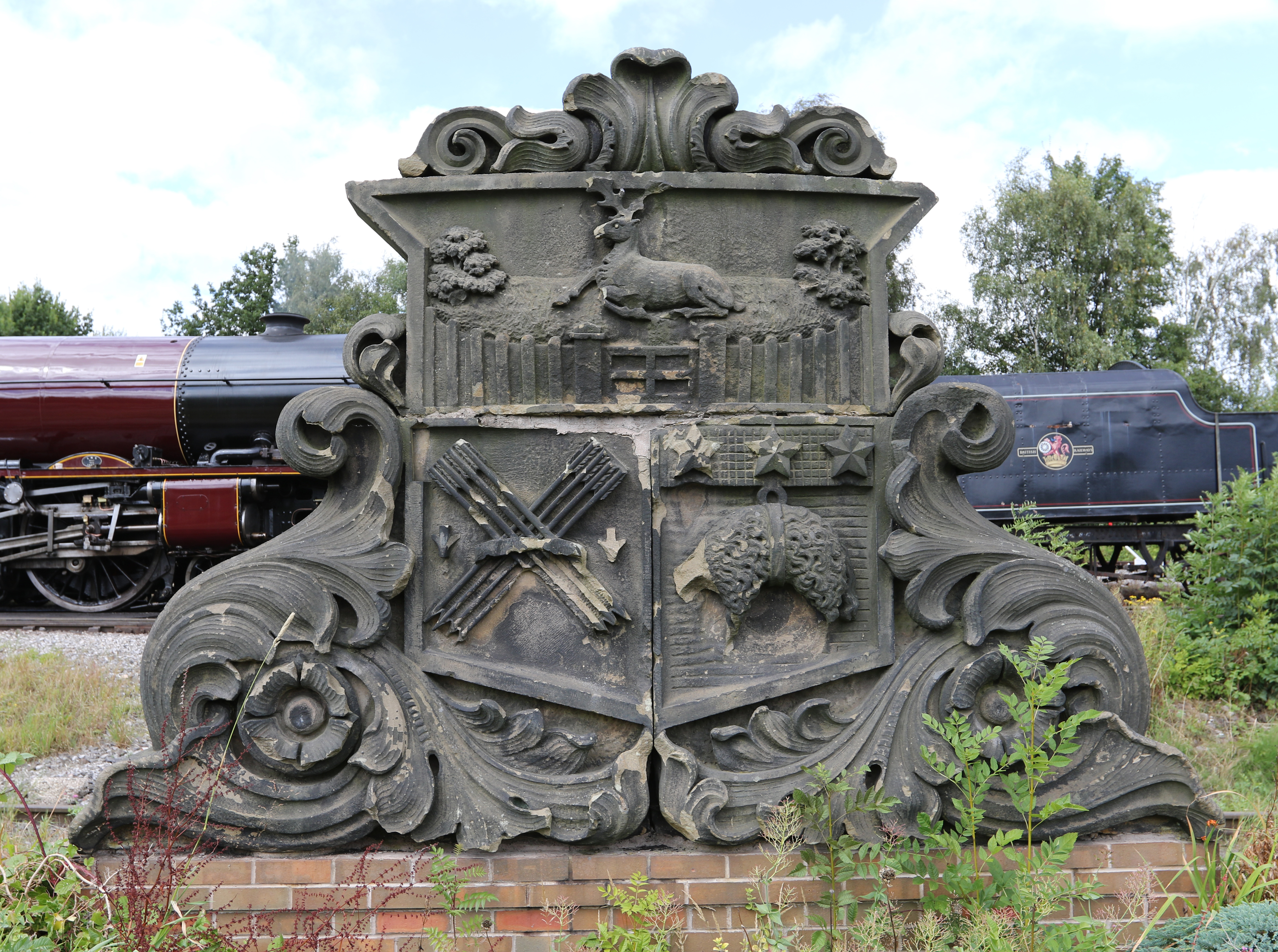

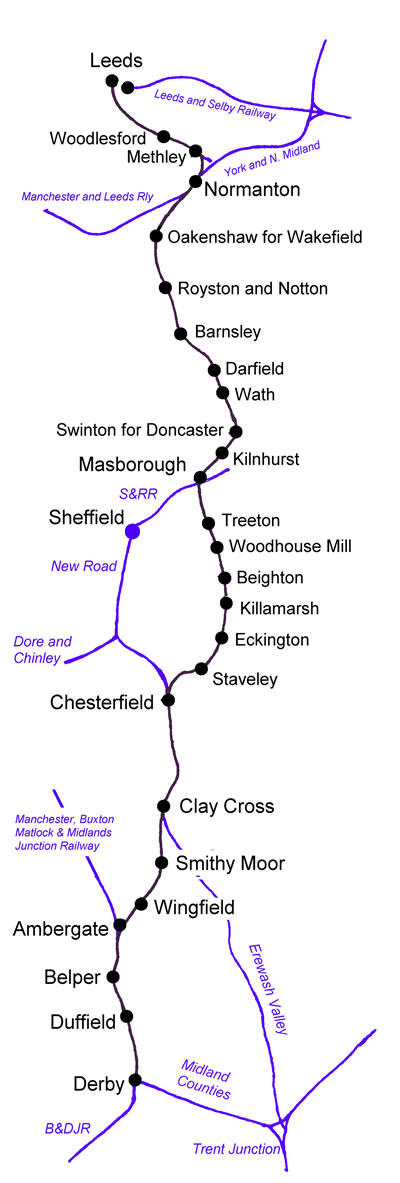
- Map of the route of the North Midland Railway

Overview
- Headquarters: Derby
- Locale: Derbyshire and West Riding of Yorkshire
- Dates of operation: 1839–1844
- Successor: Midland Railway

Technical
- Track gauge: 4 ft 8 1/2 in (1,435 mm) standard gauge
- Length: 73.5 miles (118.3 km)

The North Midland Railway was a railway line and British railway company, which opened a line from the city of Derby in Derbyshire to the city of Leeds in Yorkshire in 1840.

At Derby, it connected with the Birmingham and Derby Junction Railway and the Midland Counties Railway at what became known as the Tri-Junct Station. In 1844, the three companies merged to form the Midland Railway.

== Origin ==
The East Midlands had for some years been at the centre of plans to link the major cities throughout the country.

In Yorkshire, George Hudson was the chairman of the York and North Midland Railway, a proposed line from York towards the industrial markets of Manchester and Liverpool. The new line would connect it, and the Manchester and Leeds Railway as part of a trunk route from the South and London to Yorkshire and the North East of England. Meanwhile, financiers in Birmingham, were looking to expand their system northwards.

North Midland Railway Act 1836
- Act of Parliament
- Parliament of the United Kingdom
- Long title: An Act for making a Railway from Leeds to Derby, to be called "The North Midland Railway."
- Citation: 6 & 7 Will. 4. c. cvii
- Territorial extent: United Kingdom

Dates
- Royal assent: 4 July 1836
- Commencement: 4 July 1836 (Note: The Acts of Parliament (Commencement) Act 1793.)

Other legislation
- Repealed by: British Railways Act 1980
- Relates to: Barnsley Canal Act 1793; Dearne and Dove Canal Act 1793; Aire and Calder Navigation Act 1820; Aire and Calder Navigation Act 1828; Cromford Canal Act 1789

Status: Repealed

Text of statute as originally enacted

George Carr Glyn was the first chairman of the new company, with George Stephenson appointed as engineer. George Stephenson surveyed the line in 1835 with his secretary, Charles Binns. It would be 72 miles (116 km) long, meeting the York and North Midland, at Normanton, and also the projected Manchester and Leeds Railway. The North Midland Railway Act 1836 (6 & 7 Will. 4. c. cvii) received royal assent on 4 July 1836.

== Construction ==
Stephenson decided the line would follow the river valleys from Derby to Leeds, with minimal gradients and large radii curves. It therefore bypassed Sheffield, but met the Sheffield and Rotherham Railway at Masbrough.

His method of working was to follow river valleys as far as possible, with branches into major towns along the way. The Sheffield people, in lobbying for the line to enter their city, engaged Joseph Locke, who believed lines should pass through towns, proceeding along hills, if necessary, with bridges, embankments and cuttings. These were the two opposing schools of thought at the time and, in this case, Stephenson had his way.

An additional advantage was that his customers would, in most cases, be transporting their goods downhill from the mines and quarries to the railhead. It should be said, however, that the North Midland was among the first of the new breed of railway conceived as a means of improved passenger travel between the great cities, particularly London, rather than, like the Midland Counties and earlier lines, an adjunct to coal mines and quarries. Indeed, the rise in the coal trade, which was to become so important to the railways, had barely begun and, even a few years later, directors of the Midland Railway were questioning whether the revenue made it a worthwhile market to pursue.

In 1870 the Midland Railway opened a diversion through Dronfield and Sheffield, which became known to railwaymen as the "New Road", as opposed to the "Old Road". It followed a route which, in 1840, would have been uneconomic to build and difficult to work.

Nevertheless, the terrain was more difficult than for the other two railways to Derby, requiring 200 bridges and seven tunnels, and an aqueduct for the railway to pass underneath the Cromford Canal. By that time, Stephenson, who was wishing to concentrate in exploiting the coal around Ashby-de-la-Zouch, delegated the responsibility for almost the entire work of its design and construction to his engineer Frederick Swanwick.

The major bridges were at Oakenshaw, over the Barnsley Canal, and the Calder and Chevet Viaducts. In addition there were massive stone retaining walls for the cutting through Belper and the embankment north of Ambergate. Although the general radius of curves was one mile (1.6 km), gradients were as steep as 1 in 264 and practically the whole length was embanked or in cuttings, when not proceeding through a tunnel. The number of men employed was 8,600, with eighteen pumping engines providing drainage. It was tough work and a number of people died, particularly in the boring of the Clay Cross Tunnel. It must be said, however, that some of them were due to carelessness with blasting powder.

The track was 4 ft 8 1/2 in (1,435 mm) gauge either single or double parallel (see Rail track), the former 56 pounds per yard (27.8 kg/m), the latter 65 lb/yd (32.2 kg/m). A mixture of stone blocks and timber sleepers were used.

Not all the stations shown above were open at the beginning. The original intermediate stations were Belper, Amber Gate, Wingfield, Chesterfield, Eckington, Beighton, Masbrough, Swinton, Darfield, Barnsley, Oakenshaw, Normanton and Woodlesford. All were designed by Francis Thompson. Although praising their design, Whishaw was somewhat critical: "we cannot but deplore the growing evil of expending large sums of money on railway appendages. Instead of cottage buildings, which, for the traffic of most of the intermediate stopping places on this line, would have been amply sufficient, we find the railway literally ornamented with so many beautiful villas, any one of which would grace the sloping lawn of some domain by nature highly favoured."

Trains in those days, of course, had no toilets, so passengers had to use facilities at the stations while the train paused. On the North Midland at Wingfield and elsewhere, they were built under the engine house, with its water column, by which they could be flushed. Whishaw commented that it was "a much better arrangement than in common use on other main lines." However, he added "The doorways ... are in so exposed a situation as naturally to shock the female portion of travellers, who, while the trains are stopping, cannot fail to observe the constant bustle about these buildings."

== Opening ==
It was completed to Masbrough on 11 May 1840, and to Leeds on 1 July.

The Sheffield Iris for 7 July reported on the opening ceremony:

the directors, accompanied by their friends, to the number of several hundreds, in thirty-four carriages, drawn by two powerful engines, proceeded from Leeds at eight o’clock in the morning, to Derby where they met the directors of that end of the line.... At twenty-four minutes past ten the train arrived at Masbro’ Station, where a number of passengers had arrived from Sheffield... After a few minutes rest, to allow the engines to receive water, the train moved on and arrived at Belper, at 14 minutes before one, stayed four minutes, and at 10 minutes past one, stopped within the truly splendid and extensive station at Derby where was provided a cold collation, nowise unacceptable to the travellers.... The stay at Derby occupied about an hour, or rather more, it being judged necessary to return as soon as possible, on account of the time occupied in the trip. Consequently, at half-past two, the shrill whistle of the engine gave the note of departure. The time occupied in the return however, was not so long as in going. The train left Derby at half-past two, and arrived in Leeds at five minutes before seven o’clock – four hours and twenty five minutes, the distance being 73 1/2 miles [118 km], and the train a quarter of a mile [400 m] long.

== Operation ==
From the start, there was intense competition between the Birmingham and Derby Junction Railway and the Midland Counties Railway for traffic into London.

Though this did not directly affect the North Midland, it had financial problems of its own. With so many earthworks it had been extremely expensive to build, and its station and other buildings were arguably extravagant. Moreover, by the time it opened, the country had entered an economic depression. In the first two years, dividends were as low as 3.5%, compared with 10% for the London and Birmingham Railway. Economies were put in place but in 1842 the dividend was a mere 1% and the Lancashire and Yorkshire shareholders called for a Committee of Enquiry.

This included George Hudson, and after a tour of the complete network, he insisted on drastic measures. Against the wishes of the Derby directors, Hudson and the others insisted on halving expenditure. At a meeting on 16 November 1842 in Leeds, the shareholders had their way. On 30 November 1842 at a meeting in Derby, John Walbanke Childers MP, Mr. Pickersgill, Hatton Stansfield, T. B. Pease, F. Carbutt, and Mr. Hall retired from their positions as directors, and W. L. Newton (chairman), A. Titley (deputy-chairman), Mr. Laycock, Mr. Lee, Mr Cox and J. Holdsworth remained. Six of the Committee of Inquiry, P. W. Brancker, J. T. Alston, George Hudson, George Wilson, John Waddingham and William Murgatroyd, forced their way onto the board.

One of the first acts of the new directors was to close Beighton, Killamarsh and Kilnhurst stations from 1 January 1843. Boys, instead of men, would work points at junctions, services were reduced and fares raised and a number of carriages were sold.

A quarter of the footplate staff were sacked. The remainder (43 enginemen, stokers and turners) protested over the lower wages, and were sacked as well, on Christmas Eve 1842 and without pay in lieu of notice. He employed in their place, enginemen he described as "skilled replacements" who included in their number a platelayer, a fireman, a stonemason, two had been sacked for drunkenness and one who had been sacked for overturning a train of wagons.

The result was chaos, with trains running late or erratically, and the remainder of the workforce demoralised. Finally a luggage train, with an elderly driver of only three weeks experience, collided with the rear of a stationary train at Cudworth in fog on 12 January 1843. The inquest sent the 24 year old driver, Edward Jenkins, to the York Assizes for trial and criticised the cutbacks and there was wide publicity about the trial of the driver for manslaughter. The jury at the York Assizes acquitted Jenkins and censured the directors. Meanwhile, the Board of Trade was also extremely critical and the directors made somewhat grudging improvements to working practices.

Meanwhile, the situation between the Birmingham & Derby and the Midland Counties was becoming steadily worse. Hudson's first approach was to the Midland Counties in 1843. He then negotiated a secret amalgamation with the Birmingham and Derby which would remove all the Midland Counties' trade and, in August, returned to the latter with an ultimatum. Finally, on 22 September 1843, at a meeting in Derby under the chairman of the Directors, William Leaper Newton, the triple merger was agreed.

The Midland Railway Consolidation Bill was placed before Parliament, and was passed as the Midland Railway Consolidation Act 1844 (7 & 8 Vict. c. xviii), and from May of that year the Midland Railway came into being.

== Accidents and incidents ==
- In September 1840, a passenger train was derailed between South Wingfield and Ambergate, Derbyshire. Two people were killed.
- In January 1843, a collision between two trains at Cudworth (then known as Barnsley), Yorkshire killed one person.
- On 25 April 1848, the boiler of a locomotive exploded at Normanton, Derbyshire, scalding three people.

== Present day ==
=== Derby–Chesterfield ===
This section of the North Midland is part of the Midland Main Line used by East Midlands Railway London St Pancras–Leicester–Derby–Sheffield and CrossCountry South West–Birmingham–North East–Scotland (sometimes known as the Cross Country Route) express services. In addition, the section from Derby to Ambergate, where the Manchester, Buxton, Matlock and Midlands Junction Railway diverged, has local services as part of the Derwent Valley Line, whilst the section north from Clay Cross is served by other East Midlands Railway services on the Nottingham–Sheffield corridor.

=== Chesterfield–Rotherham ===
All passenger services north from Chesterfield now serve Sheffield. The section north from Beighton Junction to Rotherham Masborough (the "Old Road") has been freight-only since July 1954, although it is very occasionally used as a diversionary route and by excursions not calling at Sheffield. It serves as a bypass line which keeps freight trains away from the congested lines through central Sheffield. As of 2013 a handful of passenger trains go the "long way round" between Chesterfield and Sheffield, travelling northbound via the Old Road to Beighton Junction then turning left (west) to pass through Woodhouse and Darnall then left again to enter Sheffield station from the north. Southbound trains reverse the process. The main aim of this exercise is to preserve staff route knowledge for times when diversions are necessary.

=== Rotherham–Swinton ===
This section has been subject to several changes as a result of integration with the parallel former Great Central Railway line between Sheffield and Mexborough. From 1966, Sheffield–Doncaster services were switched from Sheffield Victoria to Sheffield (Midland) station, and thus ran over the North Midland line through Rotherham Masborough as far north as Aldwarke Junction (south of Kilnhurst). In 1987, the opening of a new connecting line between Holmes Junction and Rotherham Central on the former Great Central line allowed local trains to serve a reopened Rotherham Central station, with Masborough station closing the following year. In 1990 the former freight connecting curve between Swinton Town and Mexborough was reopened, allowing passenger trains for Doncaster to use the North Midland line between Aldwarke Junction and the reopened Swinton station.

Current passenger services are: CrossCountry long distance express services, and Northern stopping services from Sheffield to Leeds (via Wakefield Westgate), and to Adwick or Scunthorpe (via Doncaster), along with infrequent East Midlands Railway express services from London to Leeds, and Northern Rail stopping trains to York via Pontefract. The stopping trains run via Rotherham Central and only use the North Midland line north of Aldwarke Junction.

=== Swinton–Normanton ===
Stopping passenger trains between Sheffield and Leeds via Cudworth were withdrawn in January 1968, with all of the remaining stations between Rotherham Masborough and Normanton closing at that time. The section between Swinton (Wath Road Junction) and Cudworth had been plagued by mining subsidence for years, and so in October 1968 the decision was taken for safety reasons to divert all remaining passenger traffic onto the Swinton and Knottingley Railway via Moorthorpe, and thence Wakefield Westgate. This entailed the closure to passengers of the complete section from Swinton (Wath Road Junction) to Normanton (Goose Hill Junction), although it was still heavily used by freight. By May 1972 however the Swinton and Knottingley line was experiencing subsidence of its own, resulting in the reopening of the North Midland section to passengers. The early 1980s saw the Swinton and Knottingley line back in favour, and finally in 1988 this section of the North Midland section was closed to all through traffic, including freight.

Today the section from Swinton (Wath Road Junction) to Cudworth North Junction has been lifted; the entire length of well over a mile between Wath Road Junction and the site of Wath North station itself has been eradicated by a large new area of light industry and commerce called Brookfield Park, one of the largest developments of its kind in the country and part of the Dearne Valley Enterprise Zone (much of this area being the former site of Manvers Main Colliery and several others), while about three quarters of a mile of the route north of Darfield is now a road (the A6195). Cudworth North Junction to Oakenshaw survives, mostly as a single line, to serve the Ardagh Glass works on the Monk Bretton spur, but Oakenshaw to Normanton (Goose Hill Junction) is all gone.

=== Normanton–Leeds ===
This section is used by stopping and semi-fast passenger services from Sheffield to Leeds (via Barnsley), and north of Methley Junction also by Knottingley to Leeds services. The line is also an important freight corridor north from Healey Mills yard, on the former Lancashire and Yorkshire line west of Wakefield. The line diverts to the modern day Leeds station while the former line and station at Hunslet Lane is now occupied by both the Crown Point Shopping Park and small road alignments. The trackbed can still be seen with Ivory Street and Leathley Road passing over the old trackbed as well as the old spur line near Jack Lane.

== See also ==
- North Midland Railway Locomotives
