= Chickenley Heath railway station =

Disused railway station in Chickenley, West Yorkshire, England

Coordinates: 53.6920°N 1.5959°W

Chickenley Heath

General information
- Location: Chickenley, West Riding of Yorkshire; England
- Platforms: 1

Other information
- Status: Disused

History
- Original company: Great Northern Railway
- Pre-grouping: Great Northern Railway

Key dates
- 2 July 1877: Opened
- 1 July 1909: Closed
Location

Chickenley Heath railway station served the village of Chickenley, in the historical county of West Riding of Yorkshire, England, from 1877 to 1909 on the West Yorkshire Railway.

== History ==
The station was opened on 2 July 1877 on the Great Northern Railway. When the Dewsbury loop opened in 1880, this station lost a lot of its traffic due to the trains being diverted, so it closed on 1 July 1909.

Preceding station	Disused railways	Following station
Batley; Line and station open	Great Northern Railway; Batley to Adwalton Junction Line	Ossett; Line and station closed
