= Leeds railway station =

Principal railway station in West Yorkshire, England

Leeds
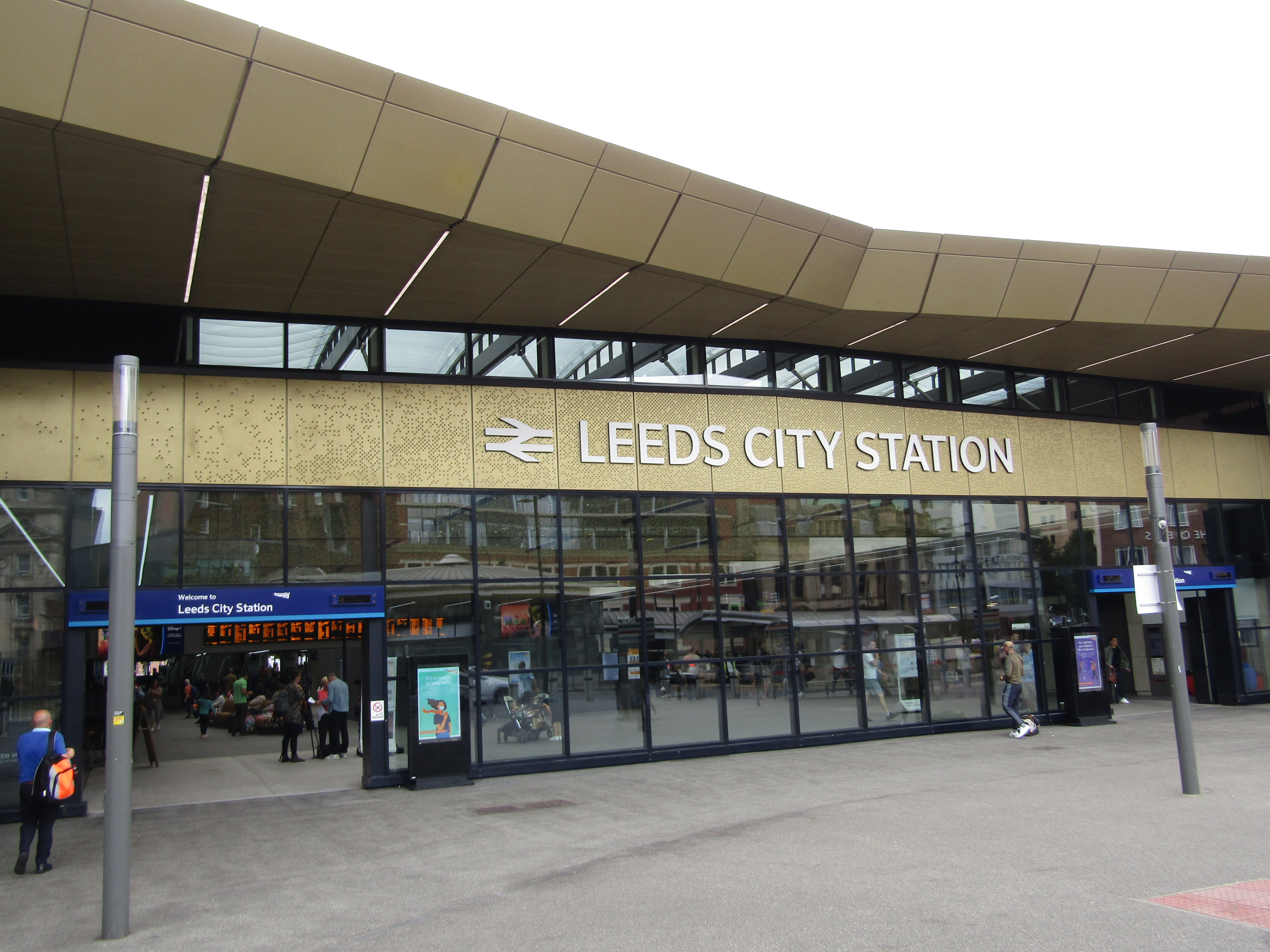
- The New Station Street entrance

General information
- Other names: Leeds City
- Location: Leeds, City of Leeds, England
- Coordinates: 53.794°N 1.547°W
- Grid reference: SE299331
- Manager: Network Rail
- Transit authority: West Yorkshire Metro
- Platforms: 18 - numbered 0-17 (National Rail)

Other information
- Station code: LDS
- Fare zone: 1
- Classification: DfT category A

History
- Opened: 2 May 1938; 88 years ago Rebuilt 1967; 59 years ago Rebuilt 2002; 24 years ago

Passengers
- 2021/22: ▲19.263 million
- Interchange: 1.798 million
- 2022/23: ▲23.964 million
- Interchange: ▲2.489 million
- 2023/24: ▲24.891 million
- Interchange: ▲2.684 million
- 2024/25: ▲27.310 million
- Interchange: ▲2.878 million
- 2025/26: ▲27.993 million
- Interchange: ▲3.139 million
Location
Notes
- Passenger statistics from the Office of Rail & Road

Leeds railway station (also known as Leeds City) serves the city centre of Leeds, in West Yorkshire, England. It is located on New Station Street to the south of City Square, at the foot of Park Row, behind the landmark Queens Hotel. It is one of 20 stations managed by Network Rail.

Leeds is an important hub on the British railway network, being a principal stop on the following lines:

- The terminus of the Leeds branch of the East Coast Main Line, on which London North Eastern Railway provides high speed inter-city services to London King's Cross every half hour
- The Cross Country Route between Scotland, the Midlands and South West England connecting to Glasgow Central, Edinburgh Waverley, Derby, Birmingham New Street, Bristol Temple Meads, Exeter St Davids, Plymouth and Penzance.
- The trans-Pennine Huddersfield line, with inter-city services to major destinations throughout Northern England, including Manchester Piccadilly, Liverpool Lime Street, York and Newcastle.
- The terminus for trains running on the scenic Settle–Carlisle line to Carlisle.

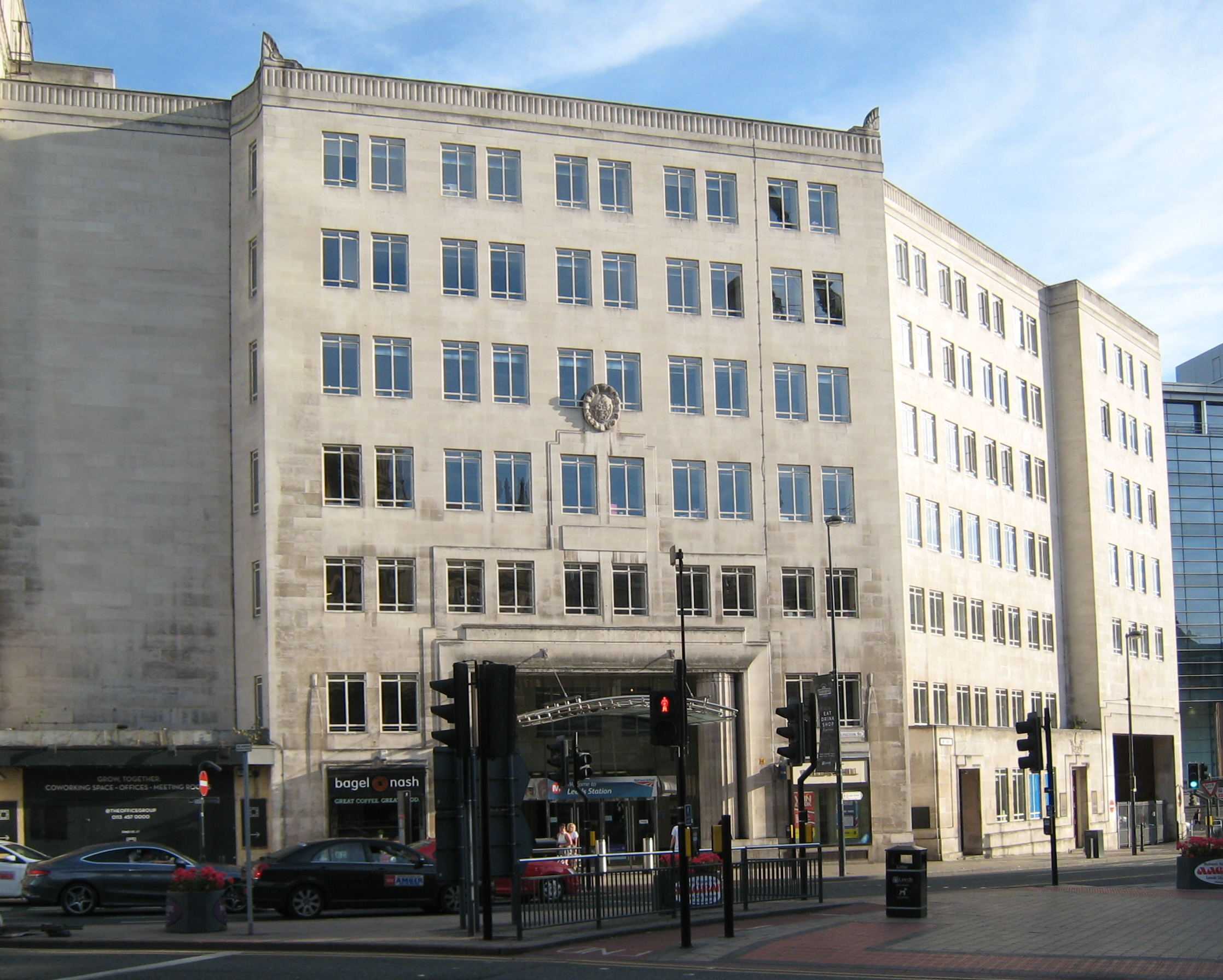
The City Square entrance

Leeds is also a major hub for local and regional destinations across Yorkshire, including Harrogate, York, Scarborough, Hull, Doncaster and Sheffield. The station lies at the heart of the West Yorkshire Metro commuter network for West Yorkshire providing services to Bradford Interchange, Wakefield Kirkgate, Dewsbury, Huddersfield, and Halifax.

With nearly 28 million passenger entries and exits between April 2025 and March 2026, Leeds is the busiest railway station in Northern England, and is the second-busiest in the United Kingdom outside London.

== Description ==
The North Concourse (Wellington Quarter) by William Henry Hamlyn dating from 1937/38; the shops on the right were previously platform entrances

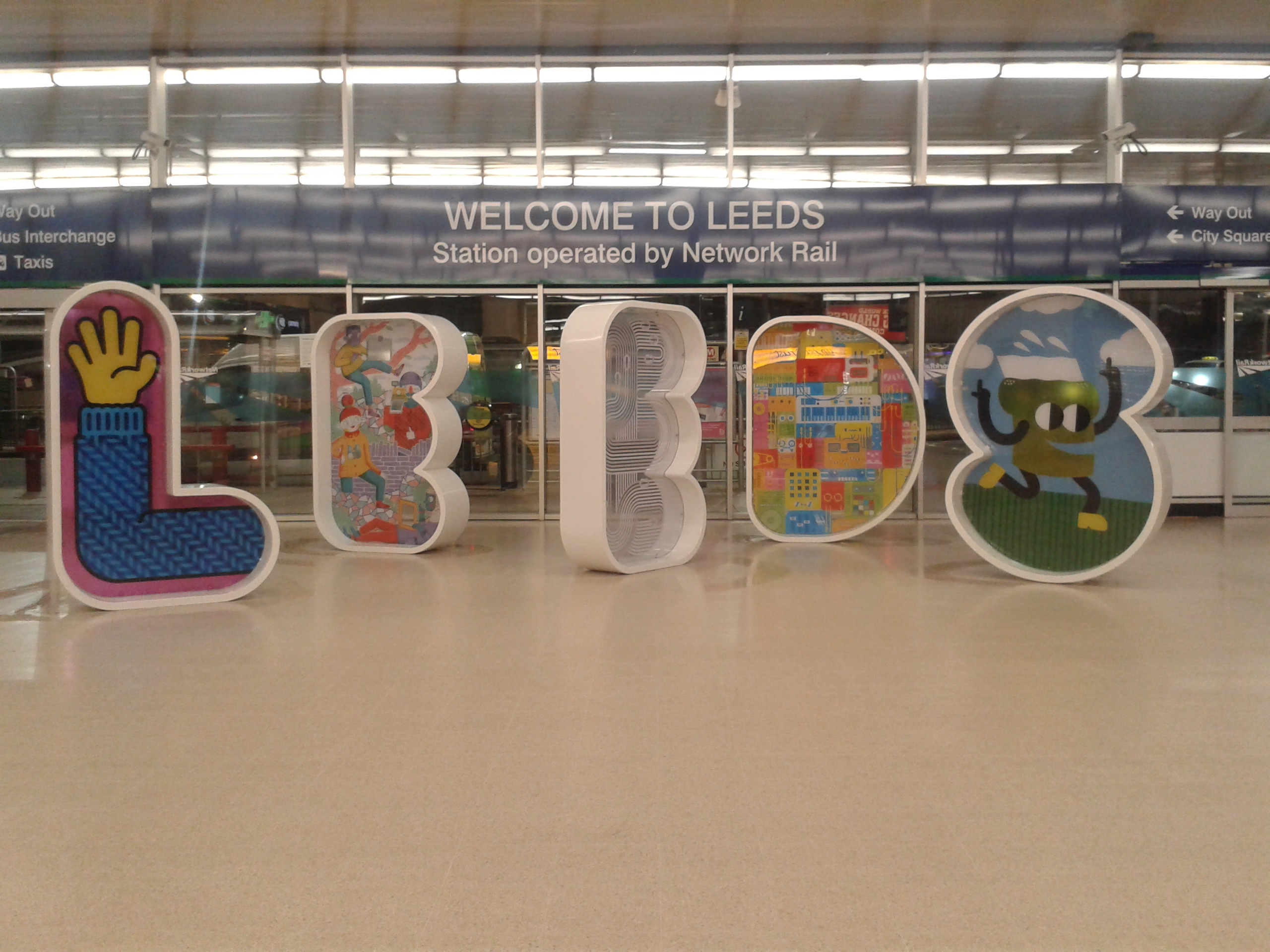
The 6-foot high 'LEEDS' letters inside the main entrance to the station

Platform hall

The station is situated on a hill falling from the south of the city to the River Aire and the Leeds and Liverpool Canal basin. Much of it is supported on Victorian brick-vaulted arches situated just off Neville Street which contain a centre consisting of cafés, restaurants, shops and exhibition spaces called Granary Wharf, known locally as the Dark Arches.

It has 18 platforms, making it the largest station by number of platforms in England outside London; there are 12 terminus and six through platforms. Most platforms are subdivided into up to four sections, e.g. 1a, 1b and 1c. Altogether, including the section splits, there are 47 platforms. Retail facilities in the station include coffee shops, fast food outlets, a bar, newsagents, chemists and supermarkets. A British Transport Police station on New Station Street houses officers who police West Yorkshire's stations.

It retained staffed ticket barriers through the 1990s until 2008, when they were replaced by automatic barriers by Northern Rail to reduce congestion around the barriers at peak times.

=== Platforms ===
Platform usage varies depending on operational circumstances but is generally:

- 0–5: bay platforms mostly used by West Yorkshire Metro services operated by Northern Trains, towards Harrogate, Ilkley, Bradford Forster Square and Skipton.
- 6; a bay platform used for London North Eastern Railway services terminating from London and towards Harrogate.
- 8, 9, 11, 12, 15, 16: through platforms. 8 is a through platform that London North Eastern Railway uses for services which both terminate and continue onward to Bradford, Harrogate and Skipton as well as the early morning departure to Aberdeen. CrossCountry services heading north to York and beyond depart from platforms 8, 9 or 11; services heading south use platform 12. Platforms 15 and 16 are used by north-east and south-westbound TransPennine Express services to Hull, Newcastle, York, Scarborough, Middlesbrough, Huddersfield, Manchester Airport and Liverpool Lime Street.
- 7, 14: bay platforms used for local Northern Trains' services running north-east from Leeds.
- 10, 13, 17: bay platforms used for local and regional services running south-west to Manchester Victoria and Huddersfield, alongside southbound services towards Wakefield, Barnsley, Meadowhall, Sheffield and Nottingham.

== History ==
=== Past railway stations ===
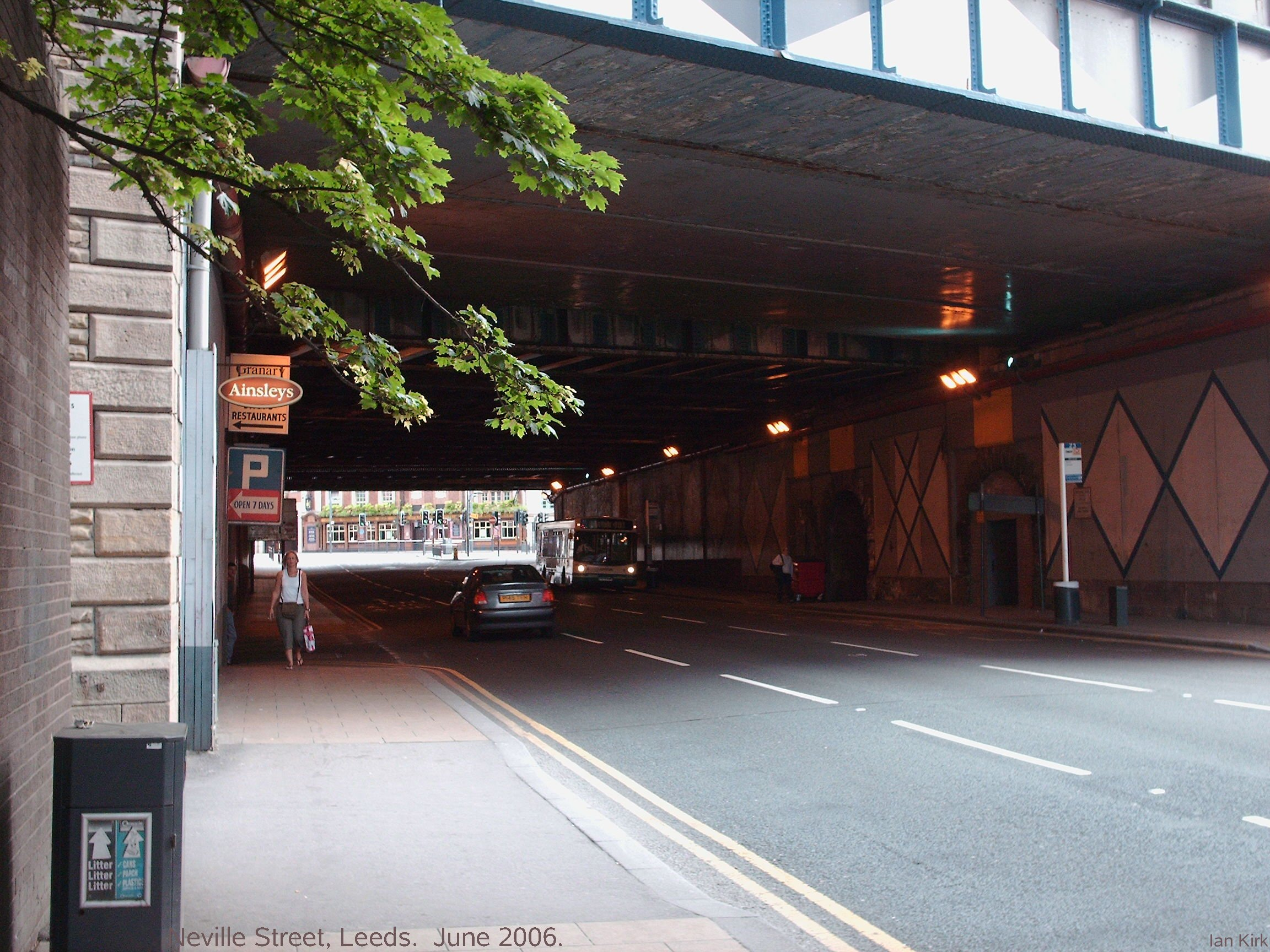
Neville Street passes under the railway station in 2006

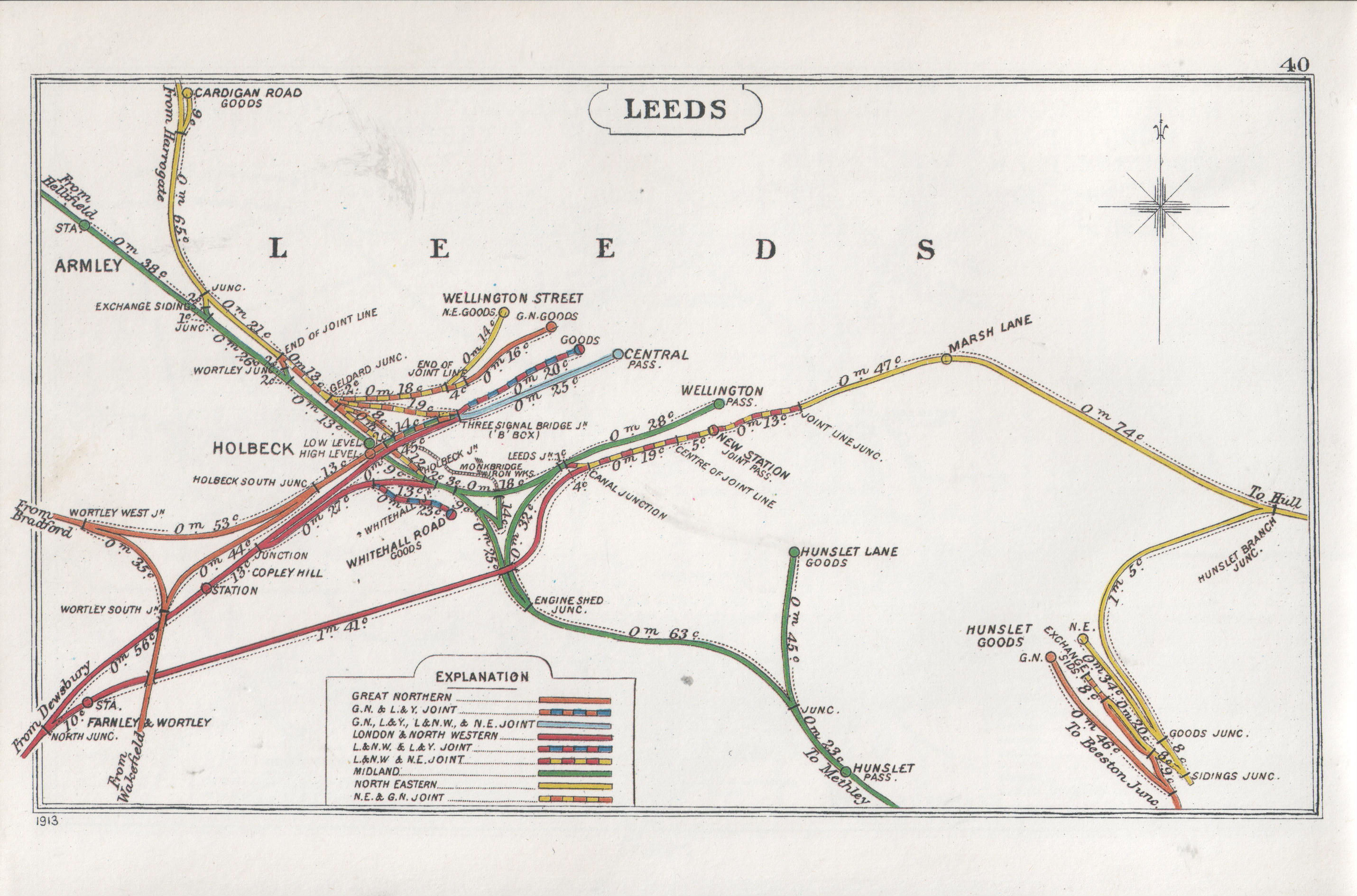
Railway lines in central Leeds in 1913. Leeds New station (as known then) is in the centre, coloured red and yellow.

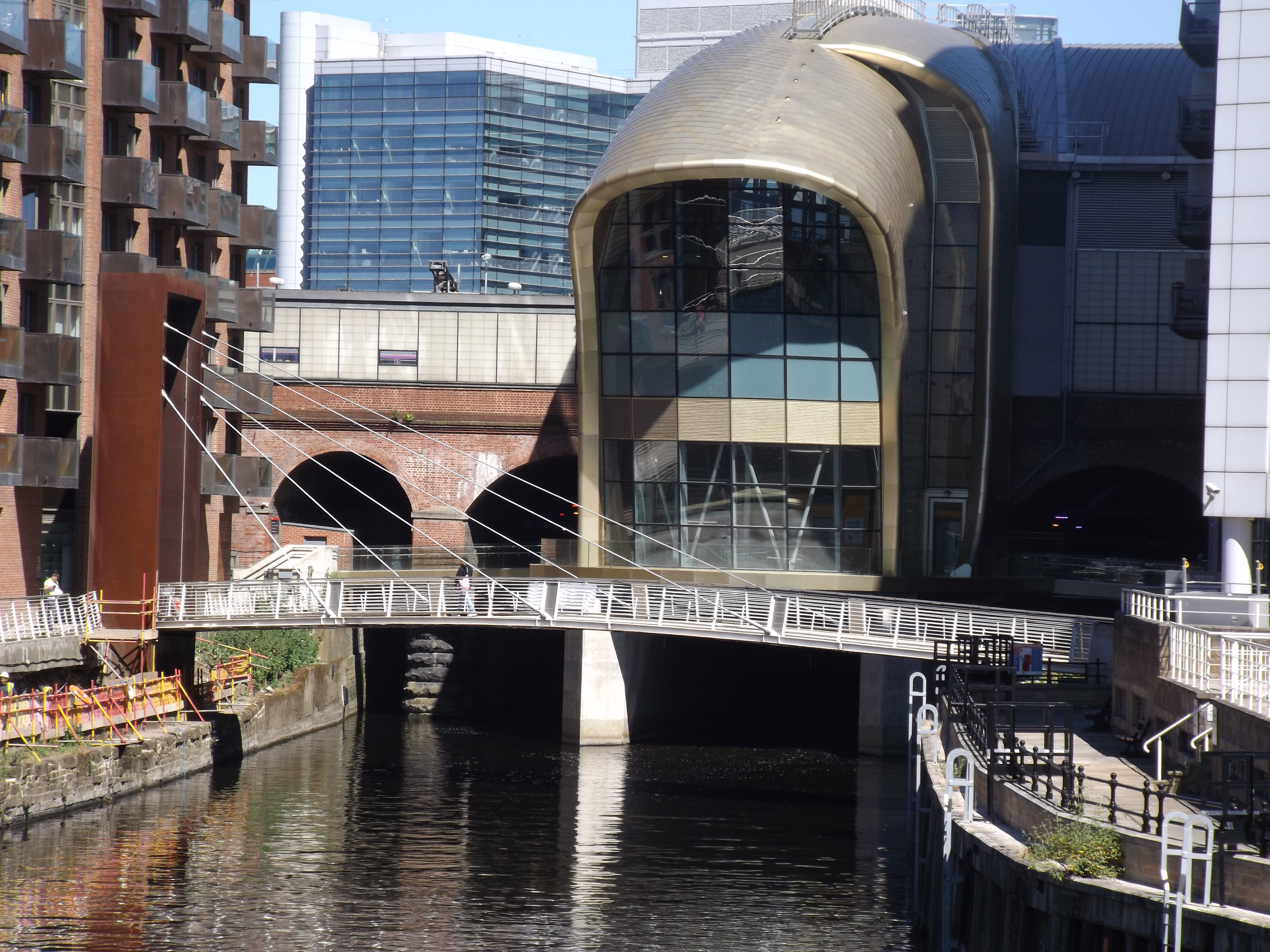
The River Aire and southern station entrance in 2018

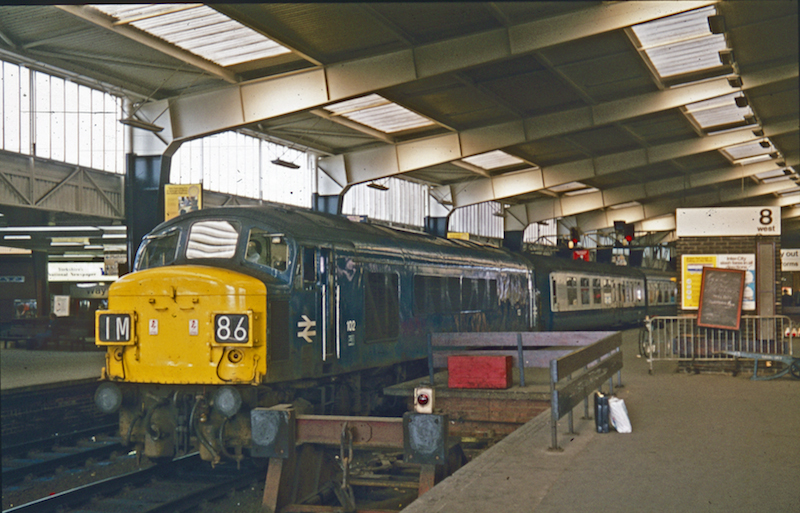
The 1967 rebuilt Leeds railway station, with Class 45 no.102 on platform 8 West in 1974

A trolley point shows the historical name of 'Leeds City' after the 2002 rebuilding (2010)

The railway arrived in Leeds in 1834, when the Leeds and Selby Railway (which became part of the North Eastern Railway) opened its line. It had a terminus at Marsh Lane east of the city centre. In 1840, the North Midland Railway (a constituent of the Midland Railway) constructed its line from Derby via Rotherham to a terminus at Hunslet Lane to the south. It was extended to a more centrally located terminus at Wellington Street in 1846, known as Wellington Station.

Leeds Central, on Wellington Street, was opened in 1854 by the Manchester and Leeds Railway and the London and North Western Railway (LNWR). It became owned jointly by the LNWR and the North Eastern Railway, but other companies had powers to run trains there, including the Great Northern Railway and the Lancashire and Yorkshire Railway.

Leeds New Railway Station Act 1865
- Act of Parliament
- Parliament of the United Kingdom
- Long title: An Act for making a new Railway Station at Leeds in the County of York; and for other Purposes.
- Citation: 28 & 29 Vict. c. cclxvii

Dates
- Royal assent: 5 July 1865

Text of statute as originally enacted

In 1869, New Station opened as a joint enterprise by the LNWR and the North Eastern Railway. It connected the former Leeds and Selby Railway line to the east with the LNWR lines to the west. A one-mile-long (1.6 km) connection was built, carried entirely on viaducts and bridges. New Station was built partially on a bridge over the River Aire, adjacent to Wellington station. The arches created under the station are known as 'The Dark Arches'.

The map to the right shows the variety of different railway lines in Leeds in 1913.

Following the Railways Act 1921, when railways in Great Britain were grouped into four companies, New Station was jointly operated by the London, Midland and Scottish Railway (LMS) and the London and North Eastern Railway (LNER).

=== 1938 rebuilding ===
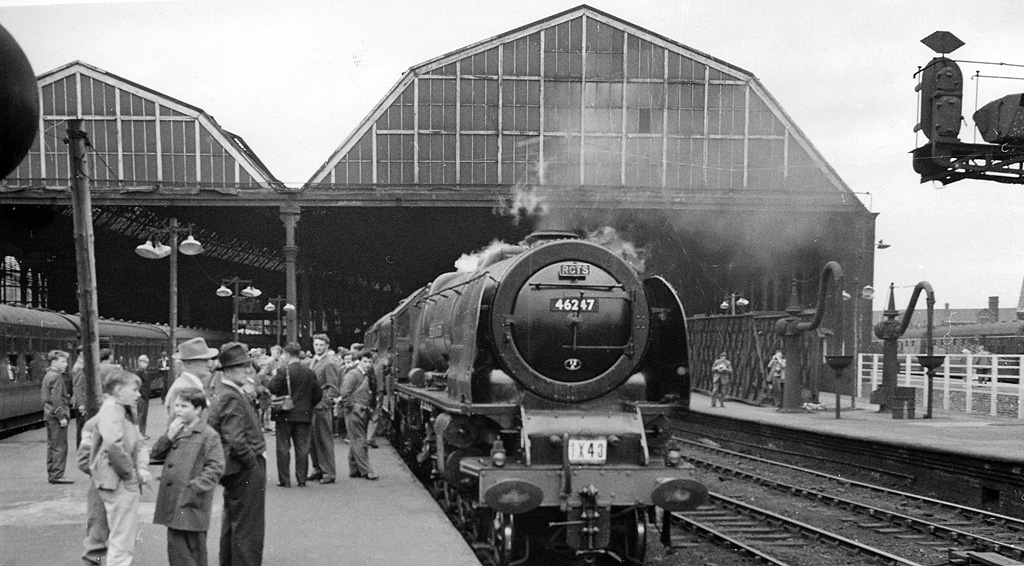
Leeds City South Station: west end, in 1961

The first rationalisation occurred in 1938, when New and Wellington stations were combined to form Leeds City, opening on 2 May of that year. This was designed by LMS architect William Henry Hamlyn. The third, Leeds Central, was unaffected by the change. Part of Wellington station later became a parcels depot. The north concourse and the Queens Hotel were built at this time.

=== Leeds Blitz ===
In March 1941, the Luftwaffe launched attacks on Leeds, Armley, Beeston and Bramley. Leeds New Station was one of the primary targets, along with the Town Hall, Kirkgate Markets, the Central Post office, the Quarry Hill flats, Hotel Metropole and part of the Inner Ring Road. The station was bombed, causing damage and an unknown number of casualties, and was later rebuilt.

The Transport Act 1947 nationalised nearly all forms of mass transport in Great Britain and came into effect on 1 January 1948. British Railways came into existence as the business name of the Railway Executive of the British Transport Commission (BTC) on 1 January 1948.

=== 1962 British Railways House ===
In 1962, British Railways House, now City House, was built. It was designed by architect John Poulson providing British Railways with administrative buildings. The building became dated and hard to let before refurbishment in 2009. It was lambasted in 1967 by poet John Betjeman who said it blocked all the light out of City Square and was a testament to money with no architectural merit. In 2010, the building was bought by property company Bruntwood, which is (as of 2017) redeveloping it to provide serviced offices, with a new look to the façade.

=== 1967 rebuilding ===
In 1967, further remodelling of the site took place; trains using Central station were diverted into City station; it was closed and later demolished. The viaduct leading to Central station is one of many that are disused in the vicinity. Engineering work included replacing 100-year-old bridges over the Leeds and Liverpool Canal, the construction of the south concourse and an overall roof, along with major platform and track layout alterations and the commissioning of a new power signal box to control the station area.

At the time of this rebuilding, the station was served by 500 trains on a typical day, with 2.75 million passenger journeys a year. Wellington (or City North) became entirely devoted to parcels traffic at this time, with the track layout extensively changed. The remaining Midland line trains which previously used City North station were diverted into the City South station, the former LNWR/NER 'New' station, and called simply Leeds from this time.

=== Electrification ===
The station had overhead electrification installed under the ownership of British Rail in 1988, to facilitate usage of the new Class 91 services on the East Coast Main Line.

=== 2002 rebuilding ===
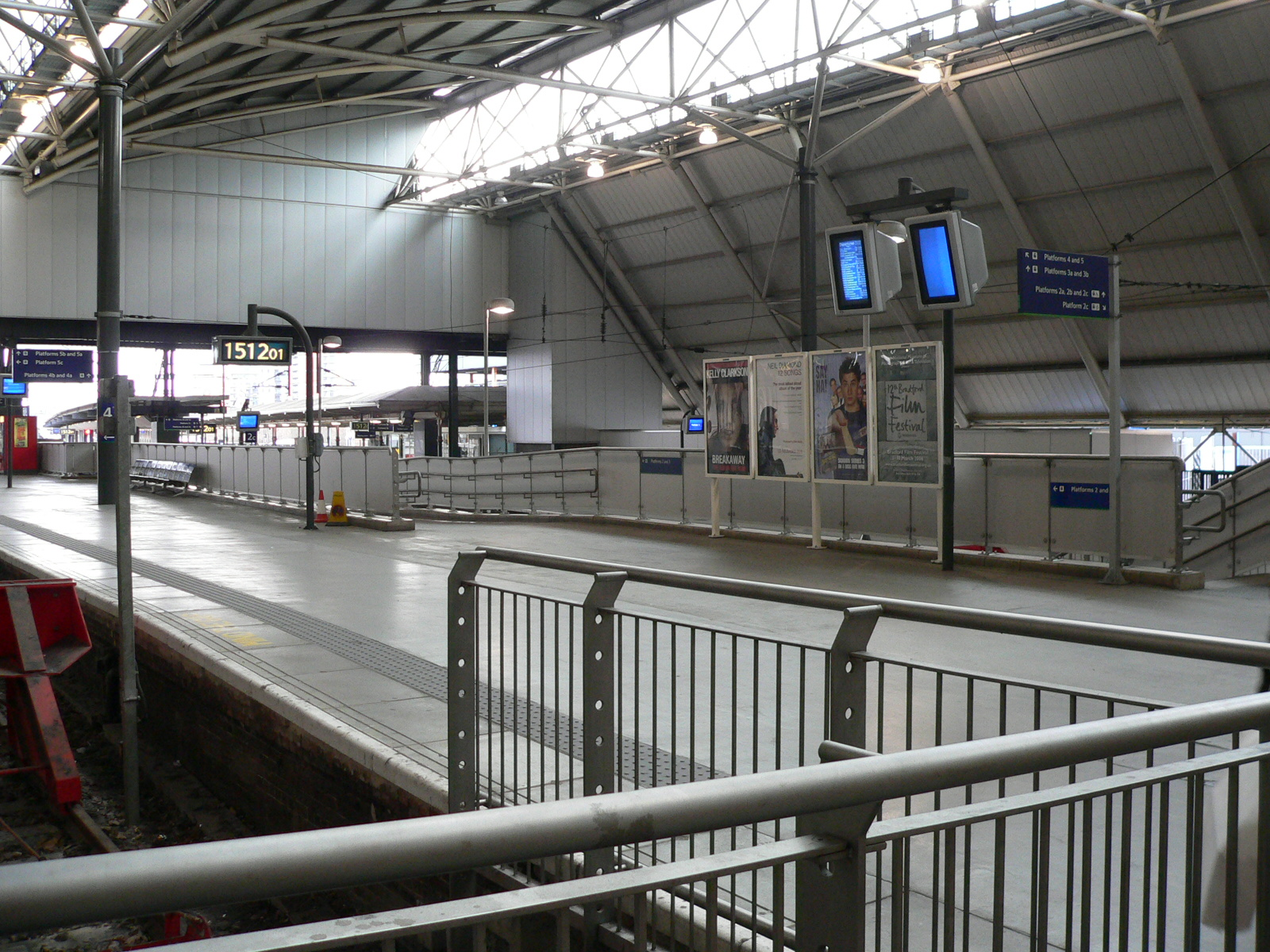
Platforms three to five in 2006

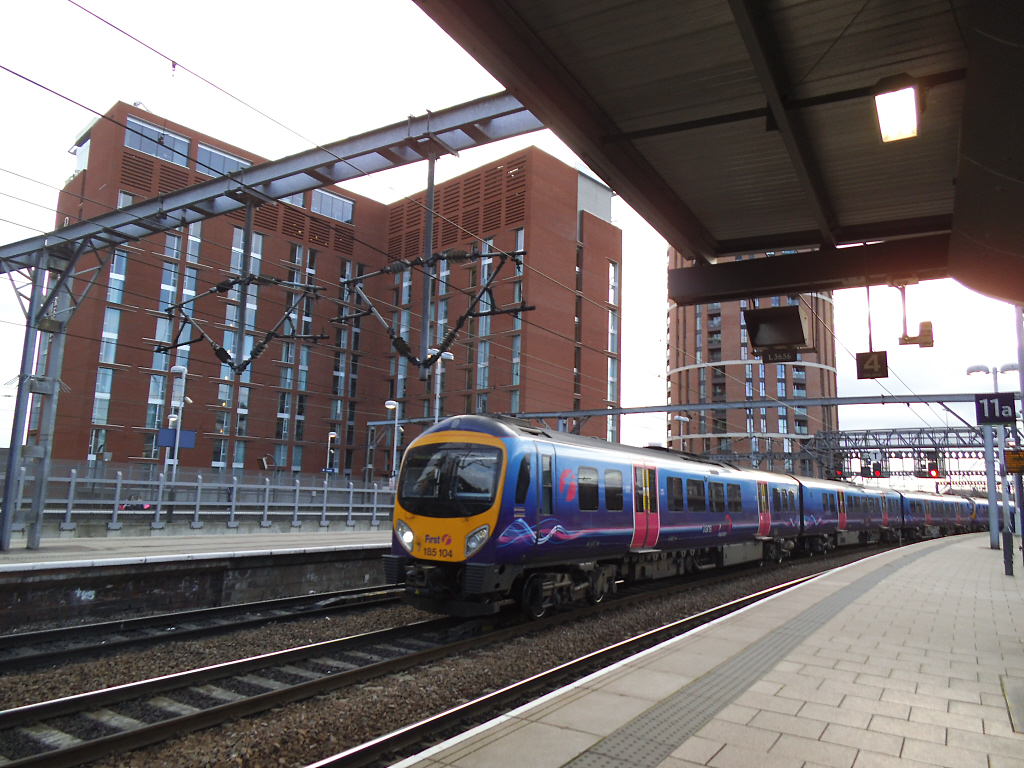
Outer platforms in 2015

By the 1990s, the station's capacity was exceeded on a daily basis and the 1967 design was deemed inadequate. Between 1999 and 2002, a major rebuilding project took place, branded as Leeds 1st. This project saw the construction of additional approach tracks at the western end of the station, improving efficiency by separating trains travelling to or from different destinations and preventing them from having to cross each other's routes. The station was expanded from 12 to 17 platforms, with the construction of new platforms on the south side, and reopening of the disused parcels depot to passengers on the north side.

The majority of the track, points and signals were also replaced and the 1967 power box closed – control being handed over to the signalling centre at York. The most visible change to passengers, however, was the replacement of the 1967 metal canopy with a new glass roof, considerably increasing the amount of daylight on the platforms. A new footbridge was also provided, replacing the previous underpass. Ancillary improvements included a new multi-storey car park and railway station entrance, refurbishing the North Concourse and expanding retail facilities.

A small temporary station called Leeds Whitehall was provided to handle some services while the station was being remodelled. This was used between September 1999 and February 2002.

=== 2008 work ===
In 2008, automated ticket gates were installed in place of the human-controlled ticket checking, to speed up the passage of passengers. When the gates came into operation at the end of October 2008, they suffered from several faults including accepting expired tickets. An oversight on the part of Northern also meant that the gates were not compatible with West Yorkshire Metro Cards.

=== Southern entrance ===
A £17.3 million southern entrance to allow for easier access from the south completed on 3 January 2016. It widens the station's western footbridge and provides escalators, stairs and lifts to a partial deck over the River Aire in an iconic structure. The deck provides access to either side of the river for passengers to access Granary Wharf and Little Neville Street or Holbeck. It contains extra ticket vending machines and cycle storage. Around 20% of passengers are expected to use the new entrance.

=== South concourse and platform zero ===
Work on a new terminal platform alongside platform 1 (labelled platform 0) began in late 2018 and was completed in January 2021.

In November 2018, Network Rail began work to improve the south concourse. The first phase of works aimed to reduce congestion by moving and expanding ticket barriers. A new transparent roof was installed, matching the design at the Southern entrance, with works completed in October 2019.

=== Accidents and incidents ===
- On 13 January 1892, a fire broke out in the arches underneath the station carrying the River Aire and the Leeds and Liverpool Canal. The fire burned for two days, with the heat buckling the rails and causing significant damage to the permanent way. One person died when a platform collapsed underneath him.
- On 23 July 1993, a passenger train ran into the rear of another occupying a platform. Twenty-one people were injured.
- On 17 April 1997, a small bomb planted by the Provisional Irish Republican Army exploded at a relay cabinet near the station, causing the city centre's closure for six hours.

== Future ==
In the year April 2025 to March 2026, Leeds was the second-busiest railway station for passengers outside London in the United Kingdom. Future expansion involved linking the station to the proposed High Speed 2 network; however, the northern leg of the network was cancelled in 2023.

=== Future remodelling ===
In October 2017, it was proposed that the station could be remodelled for the HS2 scheme. It included new platforms on the north side of Leeds, with HS2 services running into the existing east–west platforms, and new terminal platforms allowing links to 'Northern Powerhouse Rail'. In November 2017, details were released about how the station might look.

=== Expansion ===
Plans are being drawn up to expand the station's capacity. New lines and platforms would be built alongside platform one, in the Riverside car park on the site of the original Wellington station, to cater for predicted growth.

West Yorkshire Metro have announced plans to replace platform 1 with three separate platforms using the car park next to it. This would increase platform numbers from 18 to 20.

=== HS2 platforms ===
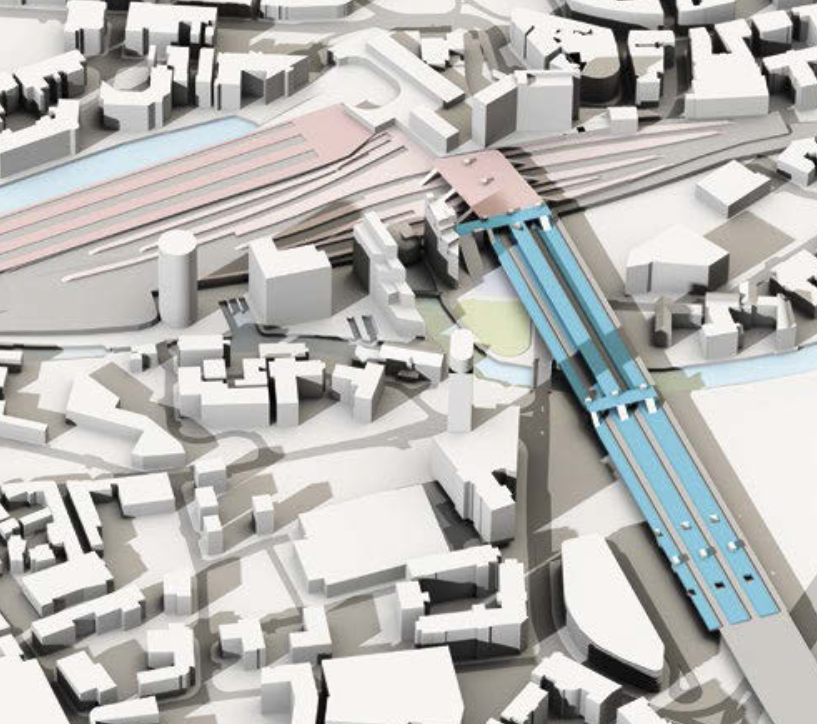
A graphical mock-up showing how the proposed HS2 platforms (blue) were to be joined to the existing station platforms (pink)

The original plans for High Speed 2 proposed a separate new station in Leeds, to the south of the River Aire at New Lane. However, a later review in November 2015 instead recommends that HS2 platforms be added to the existing station. These would attach to the southern part of the existing station building, and span the river in a north–south alignment to create a 'T' shape.

This would not link the high speed and classic rail services, but it would allow a common concourse for easy interchange between them. These plans were approved by the Government in November 2016.

However, on 18 November 2021, Grant Shapps (Transport Secretary) announced that the eastern leg of HS2 would be cancelled, terminating at East Midlands Parkway instead of going all the way to Leeds. Eventually, the leg reaching East Midlands Parkway was scrapped too, with no new track north of Birmingham Curzon Street.

== Services ==
Leeds is served by four train operating companies; the typical off-peak service in trains per hour/day is:

London North Eastern Railway

- 2 tph to London King's Cross
- 1 tp2h to Harrogate
- 1 tp2h to Bradford Forster Square
- 1 tpd to Skipton

CrossCountry

- 1 tph to Edinburgh, of which:
  - 1 tpd continues to Glasgow Central
  - 1 tpd continues to Aberdeen
- 1 tph to Plymouth; of which:
  - 2 tpd continue to Penzance.

The footbridge

TransPennine Express

- 1 tph to Newcastle
- 1 tph to Scarborough
- 1 tph to Redcar Central, via Middlesbrough
- 1 tph to Hull
- 2 tph to Liverpool Lime Street, via Manchester Victoria
- 1 tph to Manchester Airport, via Manchester Piccadilly
- 1 tph to Manchester Victoria.

Northern Trains

- 2 tph to Skipton, via the Airedale line
- 2 tph to Ilkley, via the Wharfedale line
- 2 tph to Bradford Forster Square
- 1 tp2h to Morecambe
- 1 tp2h to Carlisle, via the Settle–Carlisle line
- 1 tph to Blackpool North, via Bradford Interchange, Blackburn and Preston
- 3 tph to Manchester, via the Calder Valley line; of which:
  - 1 tph terminates at Manchester Victoria, via Bradford Interchange (semi-fast)
  - 1 tph to Chester, via Bradford Interchange
  - 1 tph to Wigan Wallgate, via Brighouse
- 1 tph to Halifax
- 3 tph to Sheffield, via the Hallam line; of which:
  - 1 tph terminates at Sheffield, via Castleford (stopping)
  - 1 tph continues to Nottingham (semi-fast)
  - 1 tph continues to Lincoln (semi-fast)
- 2 tph to Sheffield, via Wakefield Westgate (one fast, one stopping)
- 1 tph to Doncaster
- 2 tph to Knottingley; of which:
  - 1 tph via Castleford
  - 1 tph via Wakefield Westgate
  - 1 tpd continuing to Goole
- 1 tph to Hull
- 2 tph to York, via Garforth (one fast, one stopping)
- 2 tph to York, via Harrogate.

Preceding station	National Rail	Following station
Wakefield Westgate	CrossCountry Cross Country Route	York
Wakefield Westgate	London North Eastern Railway East Coast Main Line	Terminus
Wakefield Westgate	London North Eastern Railway East Coast Main Line	Horsforth
Wakefield Westgate	London North Eastern Railway East Coast Main Line	Shipley
Wakefield Westgate	London North Eastern Railway East Coast Main Line	Keighley
Terminus	London North Eastern Railway East Coast Main Line	York
Huddersfield	TransPennine Express North TransPennine	York
Dewsbury	TransPennine Express North TransPennine	York
Batley	TransPennine Express North TransPennine	Garforth
Cottingley	TransPennine Express North TransPennine	Terminus
Terminus	Northern Trains Wharfedale Line	Guiseley
Terminus	Northern Trains Airedale Line	Shipley
Terminus	Northern Trains Settle-Carlisle Line	Shipley
Terminus	Northern Trains Leeds-Morecambe Line	Shipley
Terminus	Northern Trains Leeds-Bradford Line	Kirkstall Forge
Terminus	Northern Trains Harrogate Line	Burley Park
New Pudsey	Northern Trains Blackpool North–York	Church Fenton
New Pudsey	Northern Trains Calder Valley line	Terminus
Morley	Northern Trains Calder Valley line	Terminus
Bramley	Northern Trains Calder Valley line	Terminus
Bramley	Northern Trains Halifax–Hull	Cross Gates
Woodlesford	Northern Trains Hallam Line	Terminus
Woodlesford	Northern Trains Pontefract Line	Terminus
Outwood	Northern Trains Wakefield Line	Terminus
Wakefield Kirkgate	Northern Trains Leeds–Nottingham	Terminus
Wakefield Kirkgate	Northern Trains Leeds–Lincoln	Terminus

=== Former services ===
East Midlands Railway and its predecessors operated a number of services to and from London St Pancras via the Midland Main Line until May 2022. Two evening northbound and two morning southbound services operated primarily to cycle InterCity 125 sets through Neville Hill TMD. After EMR withdrew its last InterCity 125 sets in May 2021, the service was reduced to a single northbound service operated by a Class 222; it was withdrawn in May 2022.

== Onward transport links ==
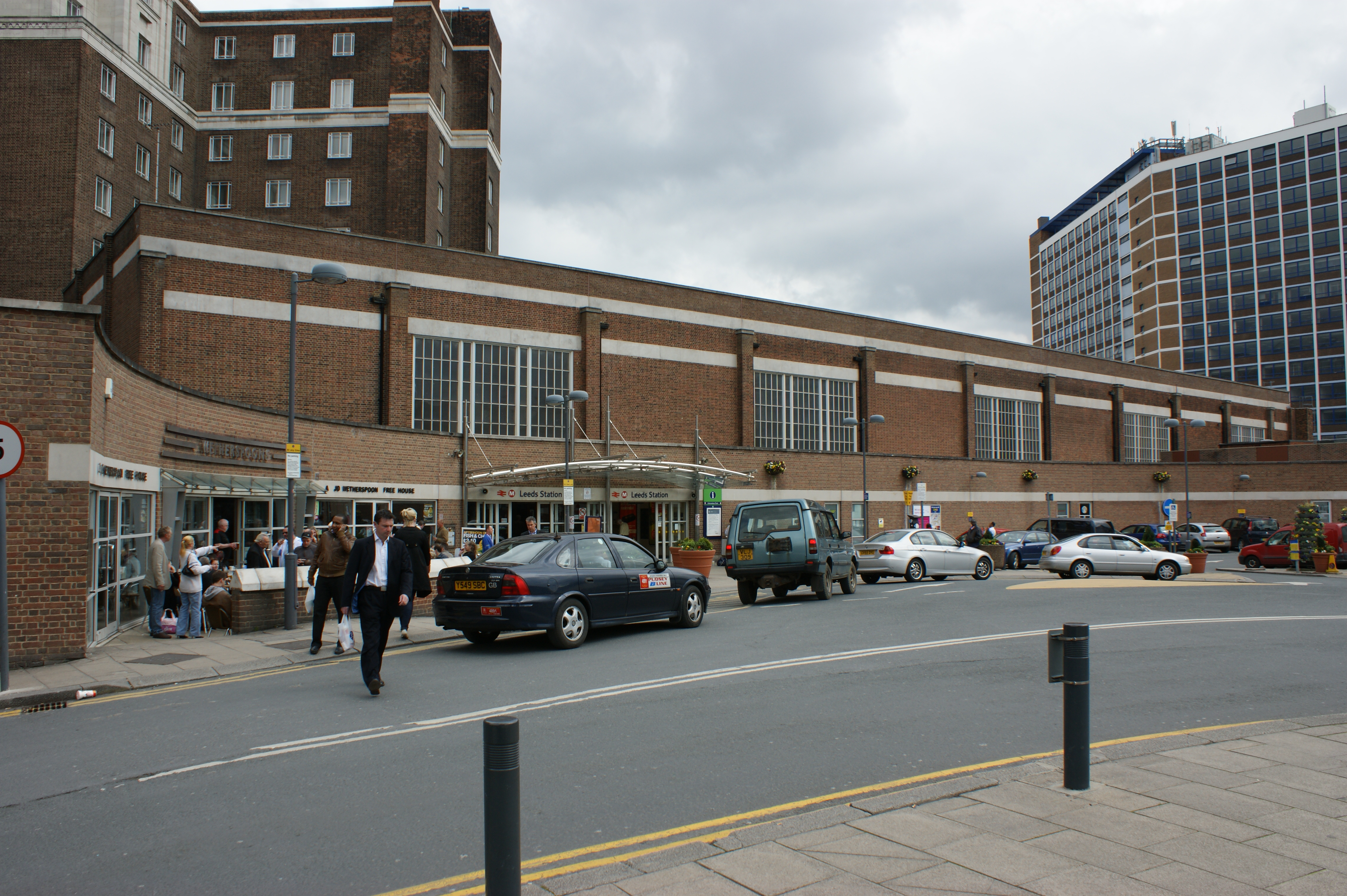
The western entrance into the station

=== Buses ===
Leeds Interchange, located at the New Station Street exit, provides onward transport connections from the station. There are five bus stands serving Arriva Yorkshire, First West Yorkshire and Flyer routes 1, 4, 4F, 5, 14, 16, 16A, 19, 19A, 40, 444, 446, 870, A1, and DalesBus services 874 and 875.

A 24-hour taxi rank also operates at the interchange.

Further bus stops are located on Neville Street, as well as around City Square. Infirmary Street and Boar Lane bus points are a short walk for more connections.

=== Cycle hub ===
Leeds Interchange used to host a cycle hub that provided services including repair, storage and rental. The facility opened in summer 2010, designed to encourage visitors and commuters into Leeds to continue their journey by bike. Its design was based on the Dutch cyclepoint concept.

The cycle hub was demolished in 2023 as part of the Leeds City Station Sustainable Travel Gateway scheme. It will be replaced by a larger underground cycle park in the Mill Goit, an artificial channel beneath the station, currently planned to open in October 2025.

== See also ==
- Listed buildings in Leeds (City and Hunslet Ward - northern area)
