= Denis Dunlop =

Denis Dunlop (1892–1959) was an English sculptor.

== Works ==
- Lambeth Town Hall, London (Whinney Son & Austen Hall, 1935–8): statue 'Youth rising from the Past', added as part of extension and redevelopment works in the 1930s;
- Former London Midland & Scottish Railway (LMS) School of Transport, Derby (William Henry Hamlyn, 1937–8): eight square bas-relief panels carved in Portland stone and set between each window on the majestic facade. Each panel represents different activities of the LMS: locomotive building, rolling stock construction, signals, and telegraphs, civil engineering, architecture, research, marine transport and traffic operations;
- RIBA Headquarters, 66 Portland Place, London (George G. Wornum, 1932–4): Dominion screen to the Florence Hall carved in Quebec pine. There are a total of twenty square panels depicting scenes from the Commonwealth countries;
- Former gas company showroom, George Street, Luton (Whinney Son & Austen Hall, 1936): figure with Flambeau;
- Pegasus House or New Filton House, Filton, Bristol (Whinney Son & Austen Hall): former headquarters of Bristol Aeroplane Company, now Airbus offices. Dunlop's works include a statue of Pegasus and a 'Britain First' panel to the east elevation, and a figure of Mercury to the west elevation. For the entrance foyer, Dunlop designed a spectacular inlay floor of marble, silver, and brass depicting the signs of the zodiac. (The connection between these astrological symbols and flight may not be immediately apparent; the Zodiac was the name given to the Bristol Aeroplane Company's first aircraft, which never made it off the ground). Perhaps Dunlop's best known surviving sculptures are in the window reveals to the projection room at Pegasus House. These ten elegant plaster panels chart the histories of natural and powered flight and are composed of winged insects, dandelion clocks, flying fish, birds, Icarus, spinning planets, parachutes, zeppelins, bi-planes, etc. Pegasus House, since 1999 a Grade II listed building.
