= Batley Carr railway station =

Great Northern Railway station serving Batley Carr, Yorkshire

Coordinates: 53.6986°N 1.6308°W

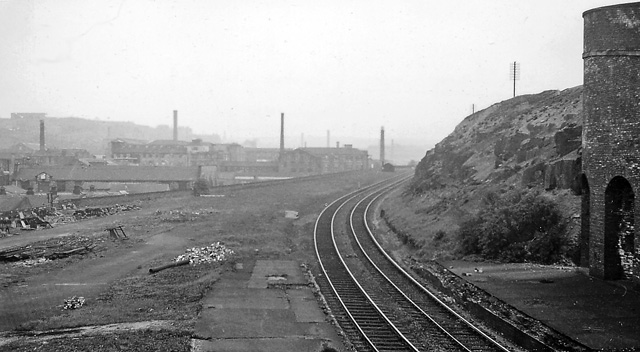
Site of the former station, looking north (1961)

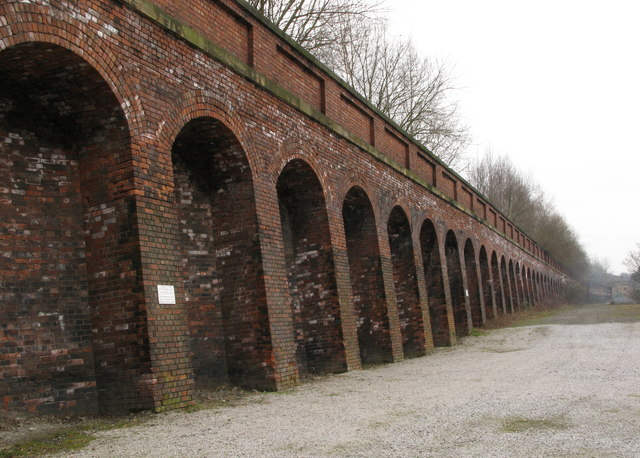
site of the former station (2010)

Batley Carr was a Great Northern Railway station serving Batley Carr, Yorkshire. It had two side platforms, with the facilities on the northbound platform. It was accessed via Wood Lane, which was built with a kink to get around the facilities. This kink survives to this day.

The station opened on 12 April 1880 and closed to passengers in March 1950.

Preceding station	Disused railways	Following station
Batley	London and North Eastern Railway; Great Northern Railway	Dewsbury Central
