= Upper Batley railway station =

Disused railway station in Batley, West Yorkshire

Upper Batley
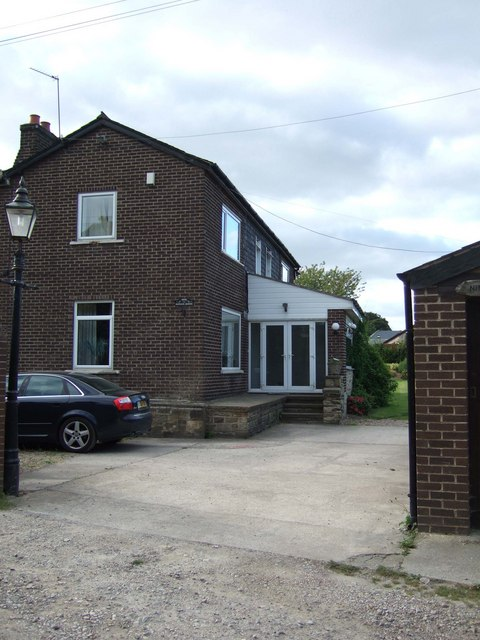
- The station building in 2007

General information
- Location: Batley, West Riding of Yorkshire; England
- Coordinates: 53.7253°N 1.6332°W
- Grid reference: SE243255
- Platforms: 2

Other information
- Status: Disused

History
- Original company: Great Northern Railway
- Pre-grouping: Great Northern Railway
- Post-grouping: London and North Eastern Railway; British Railways (North Eastern Region)

Key dates
- 19 August 1863: Opened
- 4 February 1952: Closed
Location

Upper Batley railway station served the town of Batley, in the historical county of West Riding of Yorkshire, England, from 1863 to 1952 on the Batley to Adwalton Junction Line.

== History ==
The station was opened on 19 August 1863 by the Great Northern Railway. It closed on 4 February 1952. The nearby signal box still survives.

Preceding station	Disused railways	Following station
Batley; Line closed, station open	Great Northern Railway; Batley to Adwalton Junction Line	Howden Clough; Line and station closed
