= Dewsbury Central railway station =

Disused railway station in West Yorkshire, England

Coordinates: 53.6934°N 1.6266°W

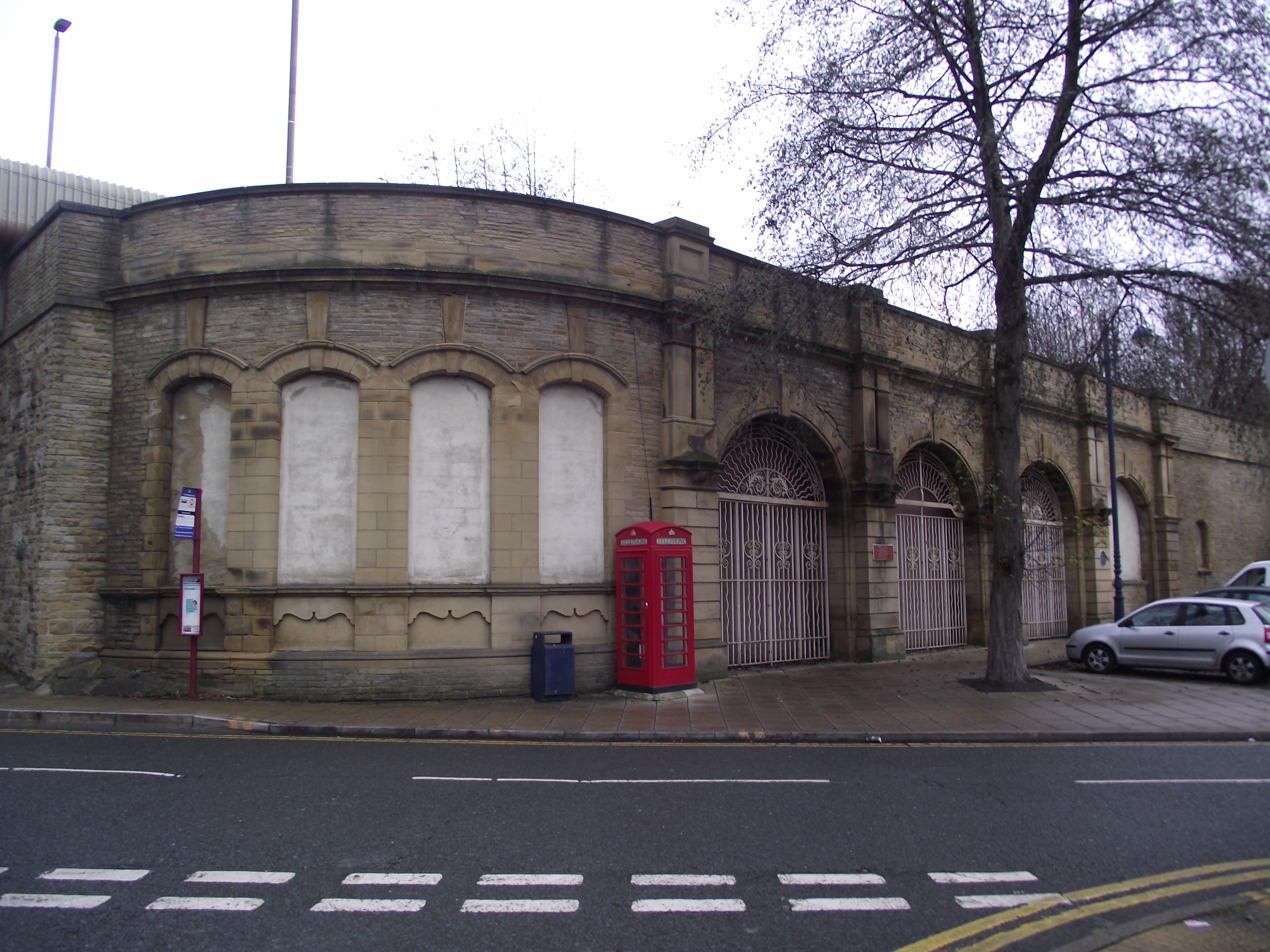
Façade (2018)

Dewsbury Central was the Great Northern station serving eastern Dewsbury in Yorkshire. It opened in 1874 and closed on 7 September 1964, although goods traffic continued along its route until 15 February 1965, after which the line serving the station was closed entirely. It is located to the east of Dewsbury railway station, which has remained open since.

The station had a single large island platform with a glass roof accessed from below through an entrance on Crackenedge Lane. This entrance survives as part of the embankment, which after the closure of the railway had the A638 Dewsbury Ring Road built over it. As well as this, some sections of the nearby trackbed have been preserved and turned into a footpath.

Preceding station	Disused railways	Following station
Batley Carr	London and North Eastern Railway; Great Northern Railway	Earlsheaton
