= Queens Hotel, Leeds =

Hotel in Leeds, West Yorkshire, England

Coordinates: 53.7959°N 1.5478°W

The Queens Hotel
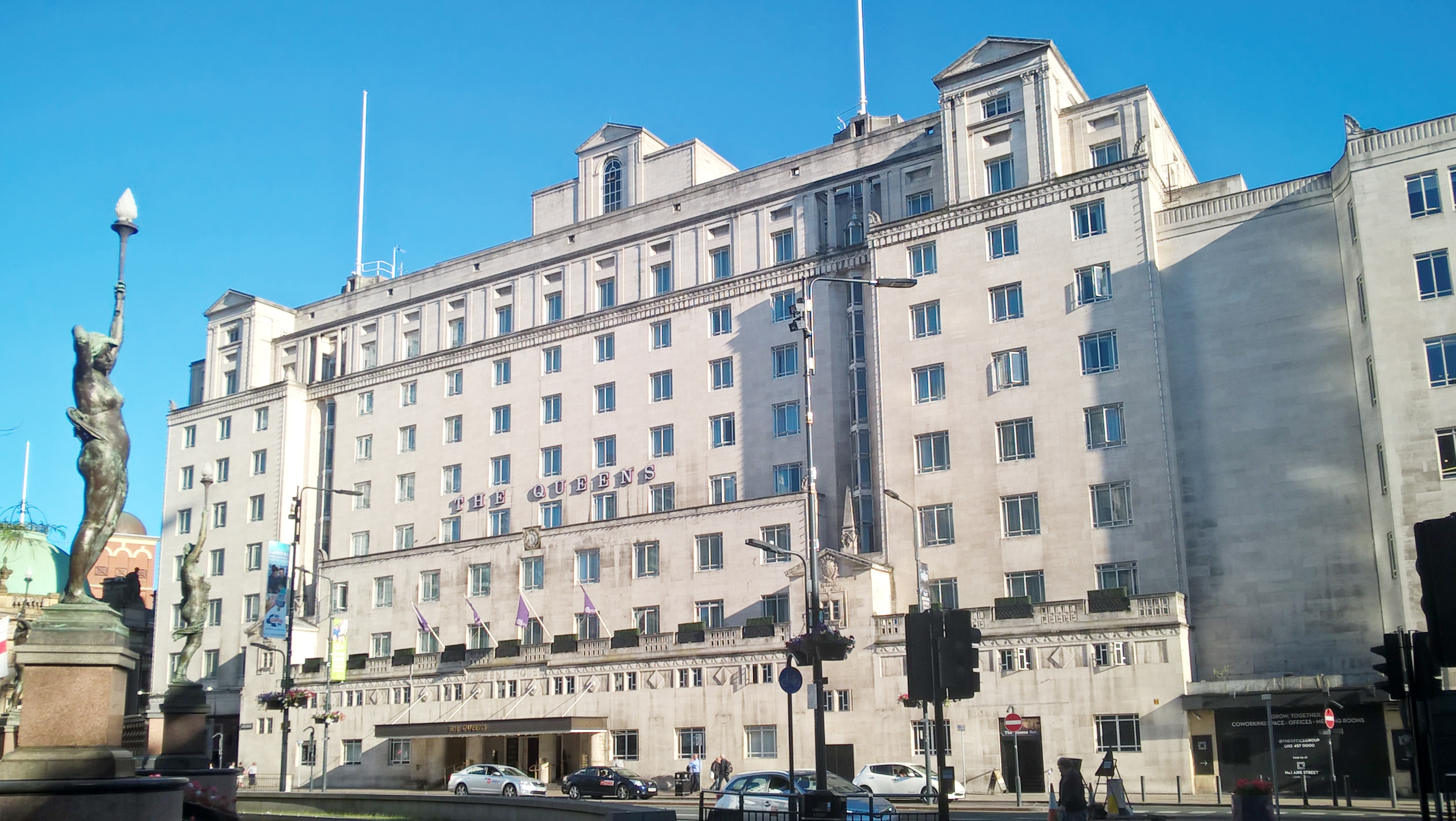
- Front face, City Square
- Interactive map of the The Queens Hotel area

General information
- Location: New Station Street, City Square, Leeds, LS1 1PJ
- Opening: 1937
- Owner: QHotels
- Management: QHotels

Technical details
- Floor count: 8

Design and construction
- Architects: W. H. Hamlyn & William Henry Green

Other information
- Number of rooms: 232
- Number of suites: 3
- Number of restaurants: 1
- Built: 1937

The Queens Hotel is a large hotel located on City Square in Leeds, West Yorkshire, England. Built in 1937, it is an elegant Art Deco Grade II listed building and was frequented by the likes of Princess Grace of Monaco, Cary Grant and Nelson Mandela throughout its history.

== History ==
The first railway hotel on this site was opened in 1863 for the Midland Railway. The Midland Railway was taken over by the London, Midland and Scottish Railway and in 1935 it was decided to demolish the old building and build a grand new one. This was officially opened on 12 November 1937, by the Princess Royal and Lord Harewood. The architect was W. H. Hamlyn and it was faced in white Portland stone with brick sides and rear. The interior design and Art Deco fittings are by William Curtis Green. The building used two million bricks and 40,000 cubic feet of Portland Stone. Prices started at 10s 6d for a single room with bath.

Later owners were British Transport Hotels between 1948 and the early 1980s and the Forte Group. It was acquired in 2003 by QHotels who gave it a £10 million makeover.

In 2011, the closed coffin of Jimmy Savile was displayed in the bar of the hotel, alongside the last cigar he smoked and his two This Is Your Life books. Around 4,000 people visited to pay tribute.

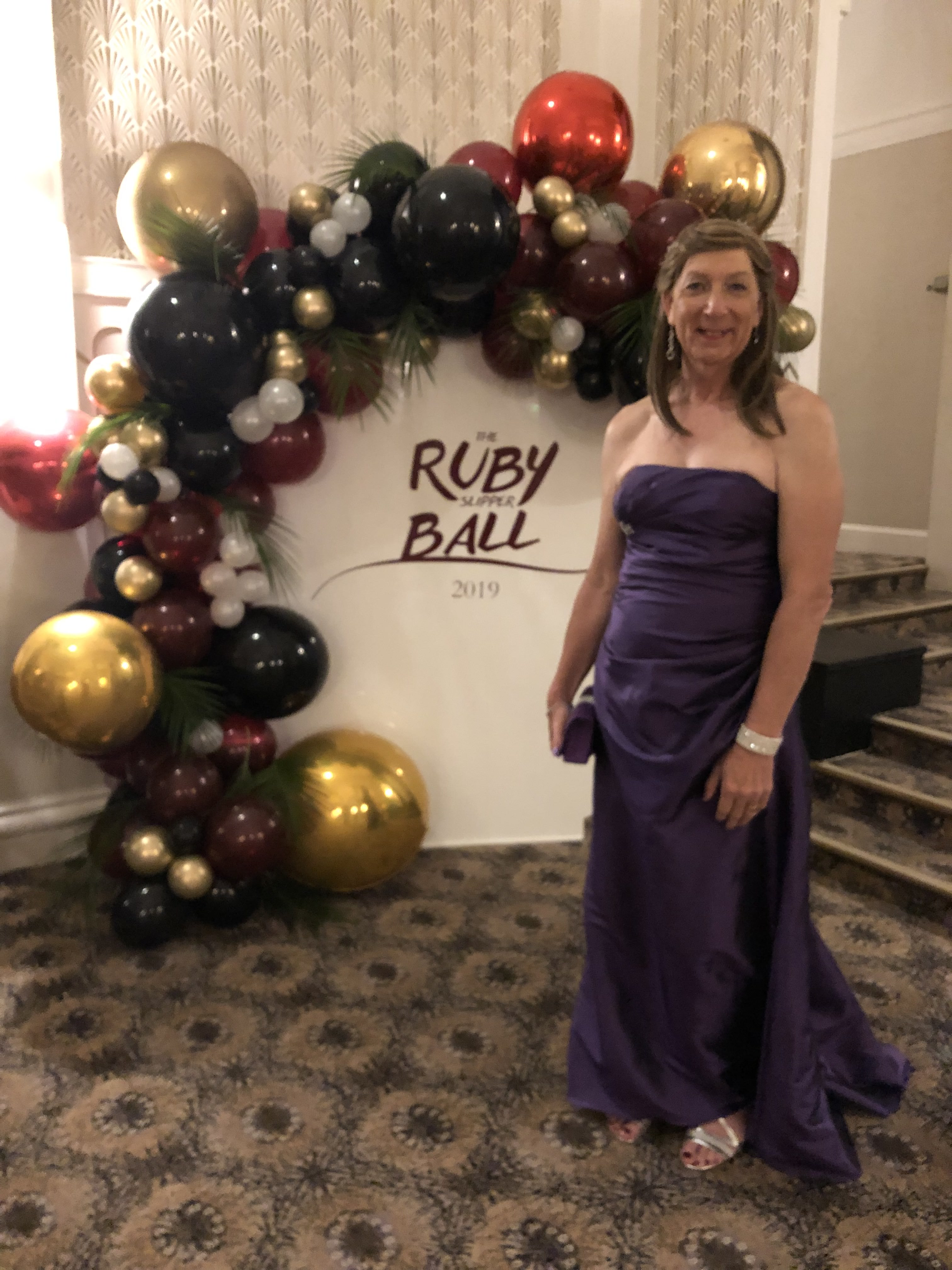
Ruby Slipper Ball, 2019

The Ruby Slipper Ball and the All Out Together ball are hosted at the hotel supporting older LGBT+ people in West Yorkshire.

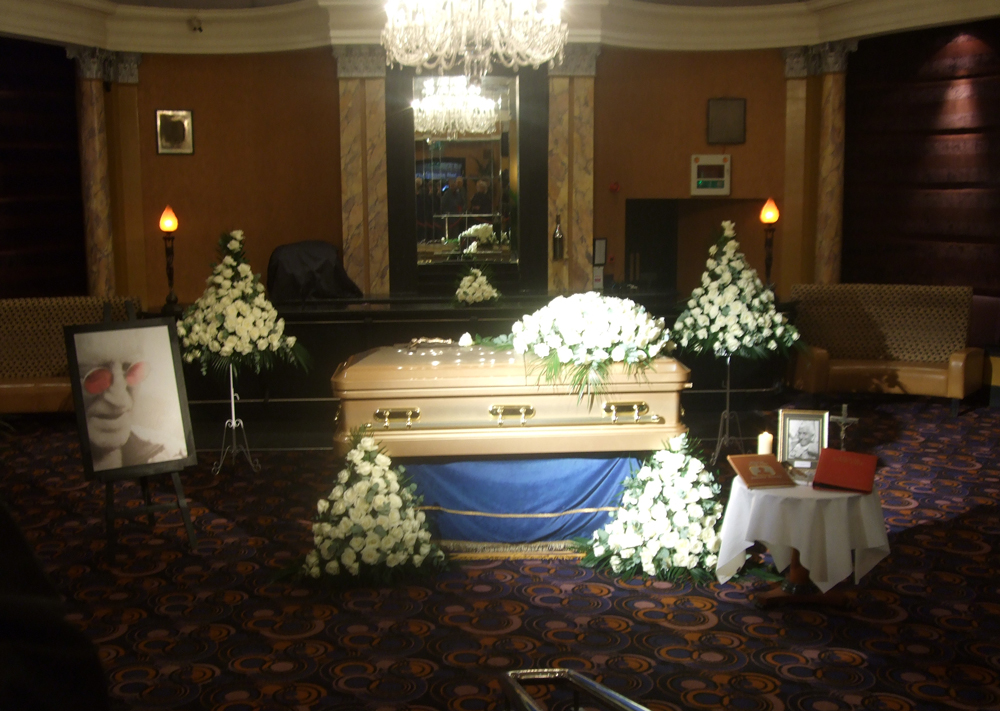
Savile's coffin on display at the Queens Hotel in Leeds, 8 November 2011

== Adjacent features ==
The hotel is not the only part of this construction. The frontage continues west and round a slight bend into Aire Street with the same arrangement of Portland stone front and brick behind. Immediately next to the hotel is the original main entrance to Leeds Station concourse, originally also Art Deco inside, but now much modernized. Next is Number 1 Aire Street, a block of offices, originally for the railway. The three buildings each have the crest of the LMS Railway.

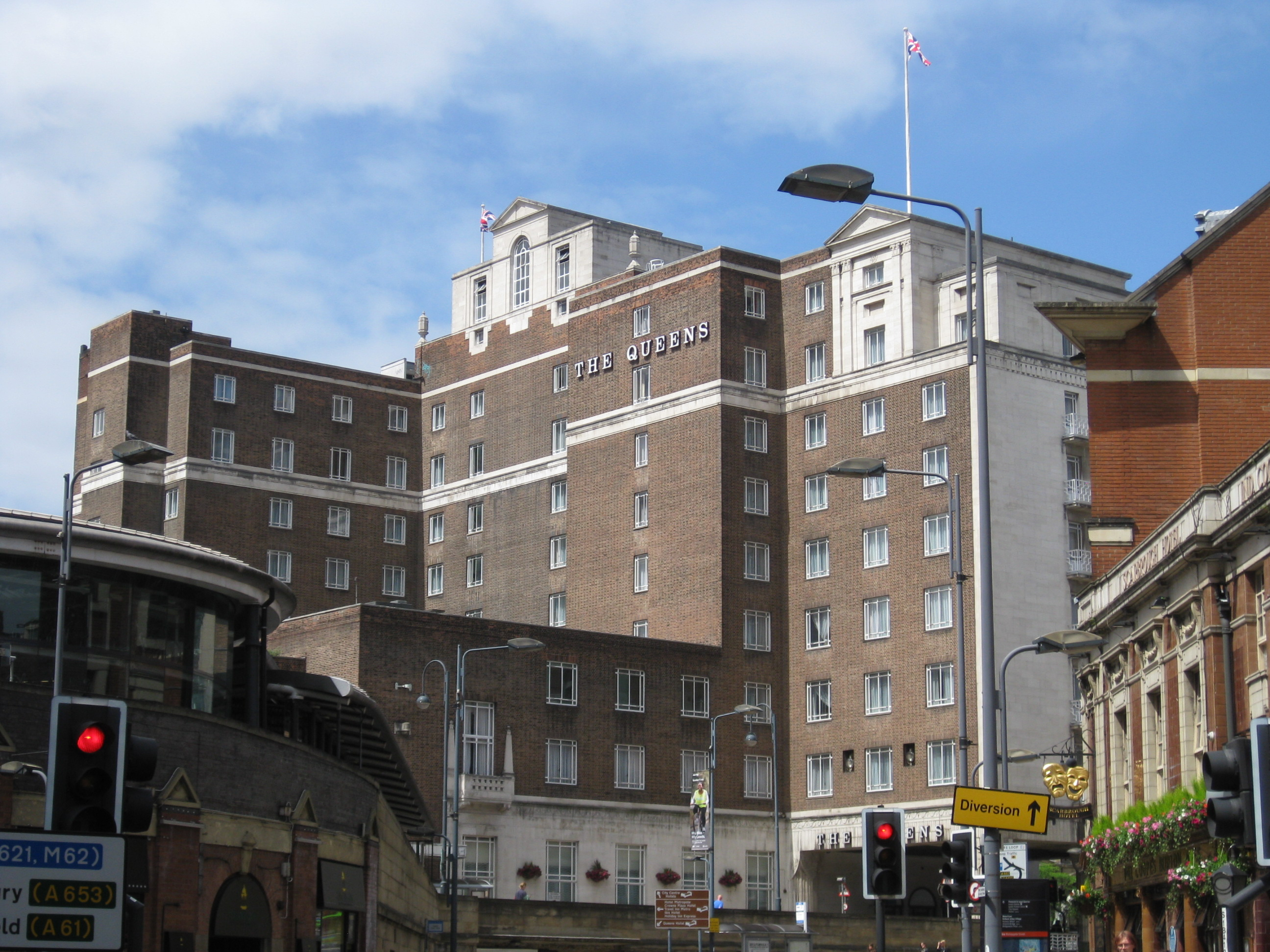
Rear view in brick

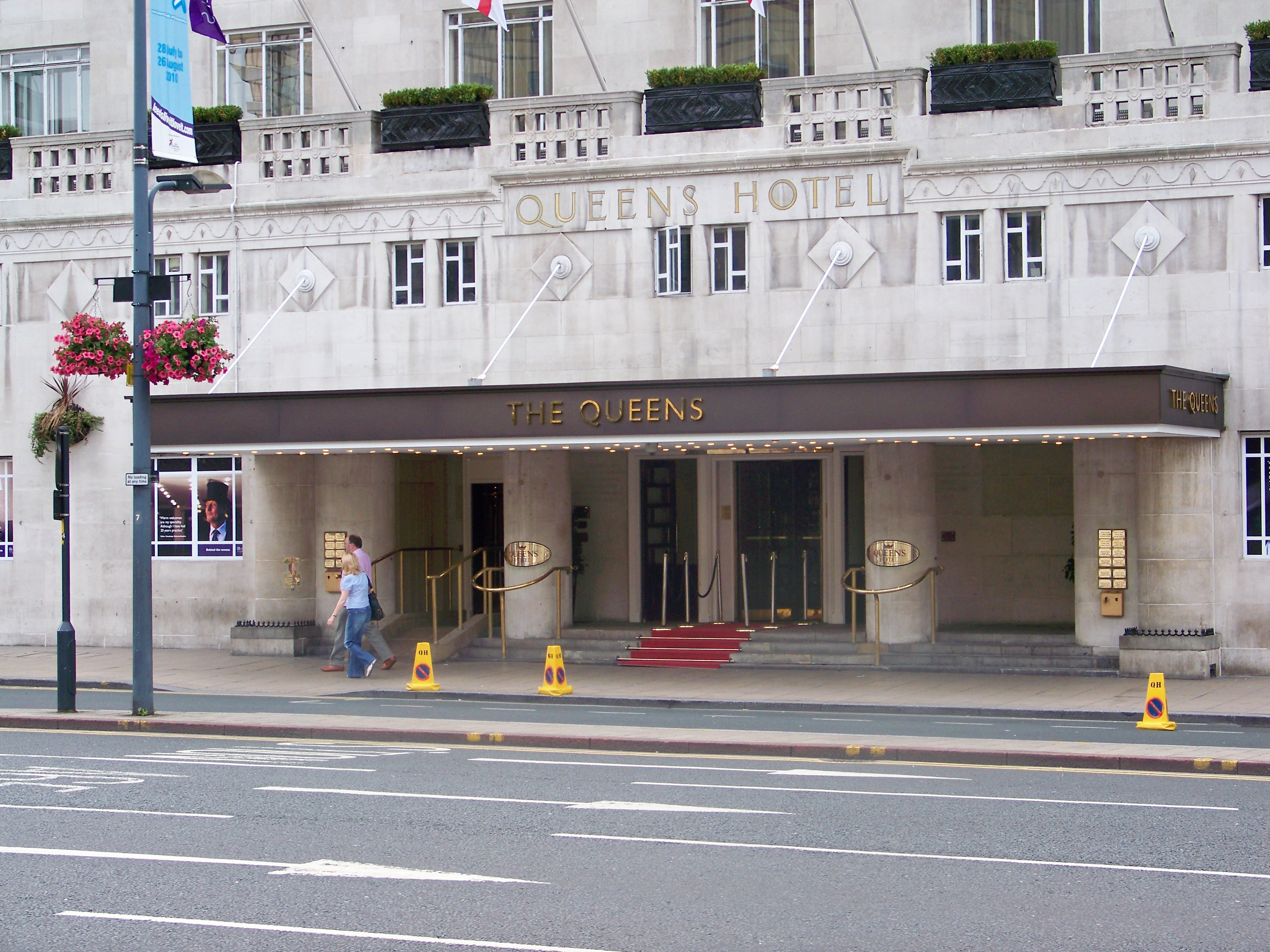
Hotel Main Entrance

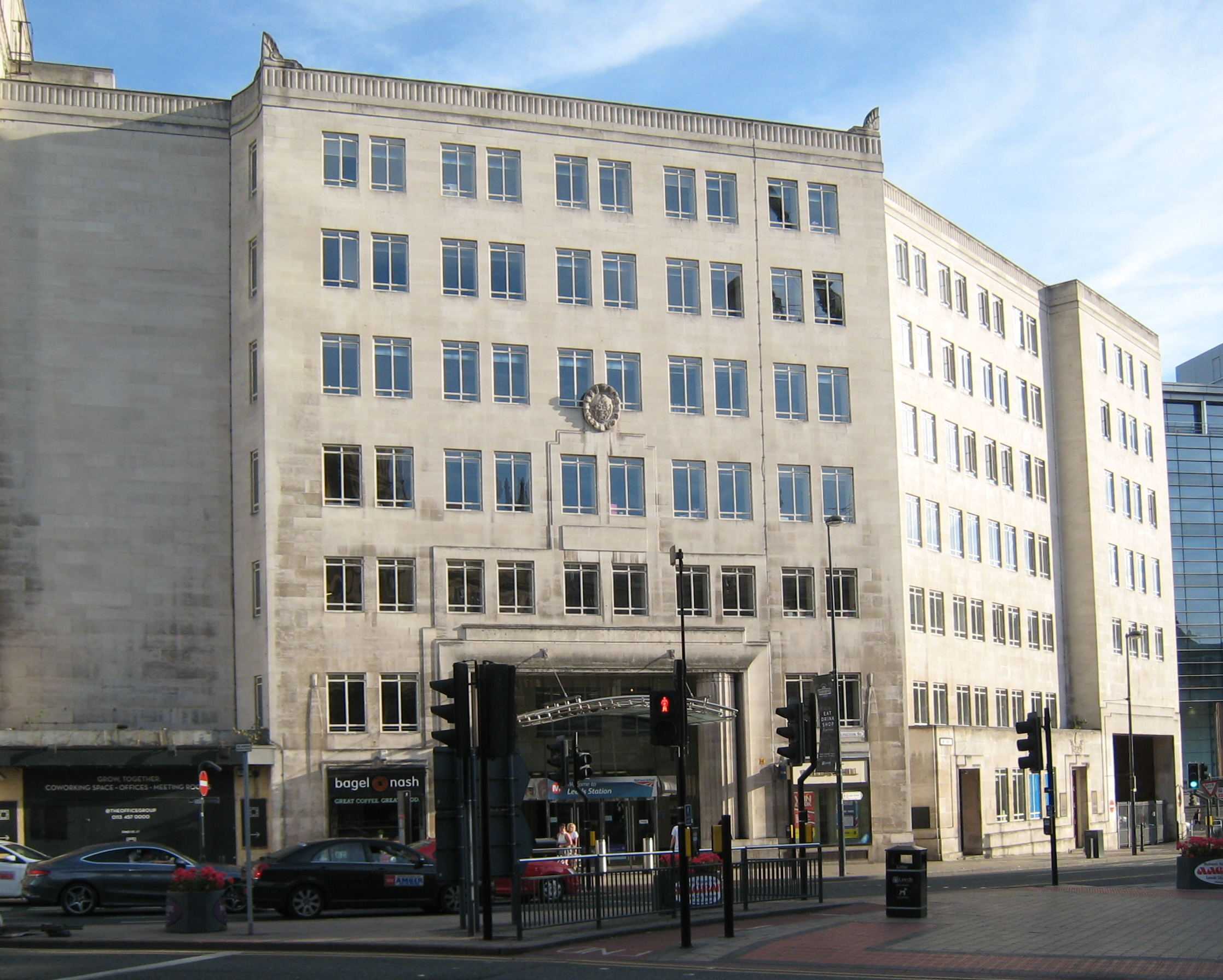
Station entrance and offices

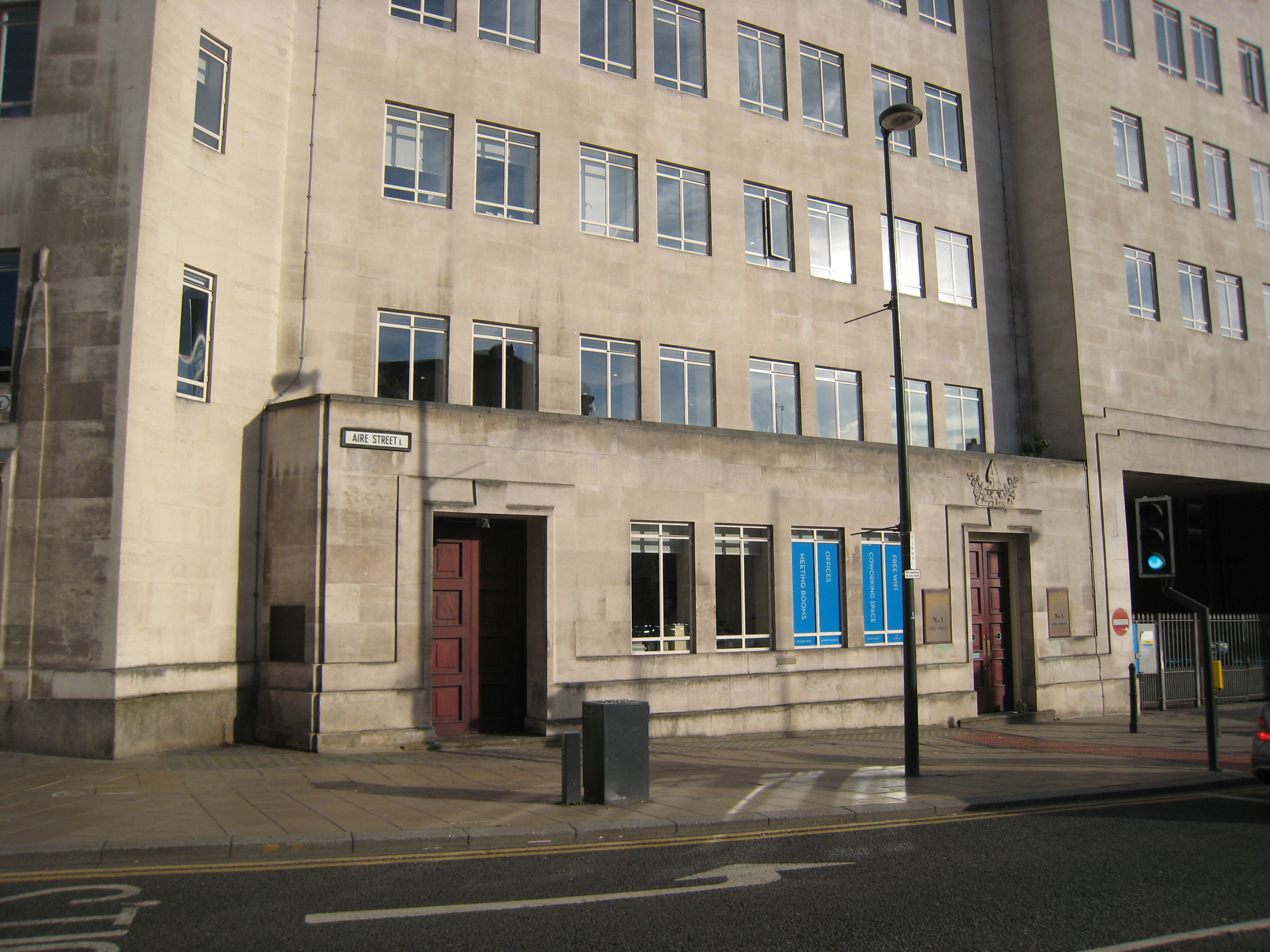
Number 1, Aire Street

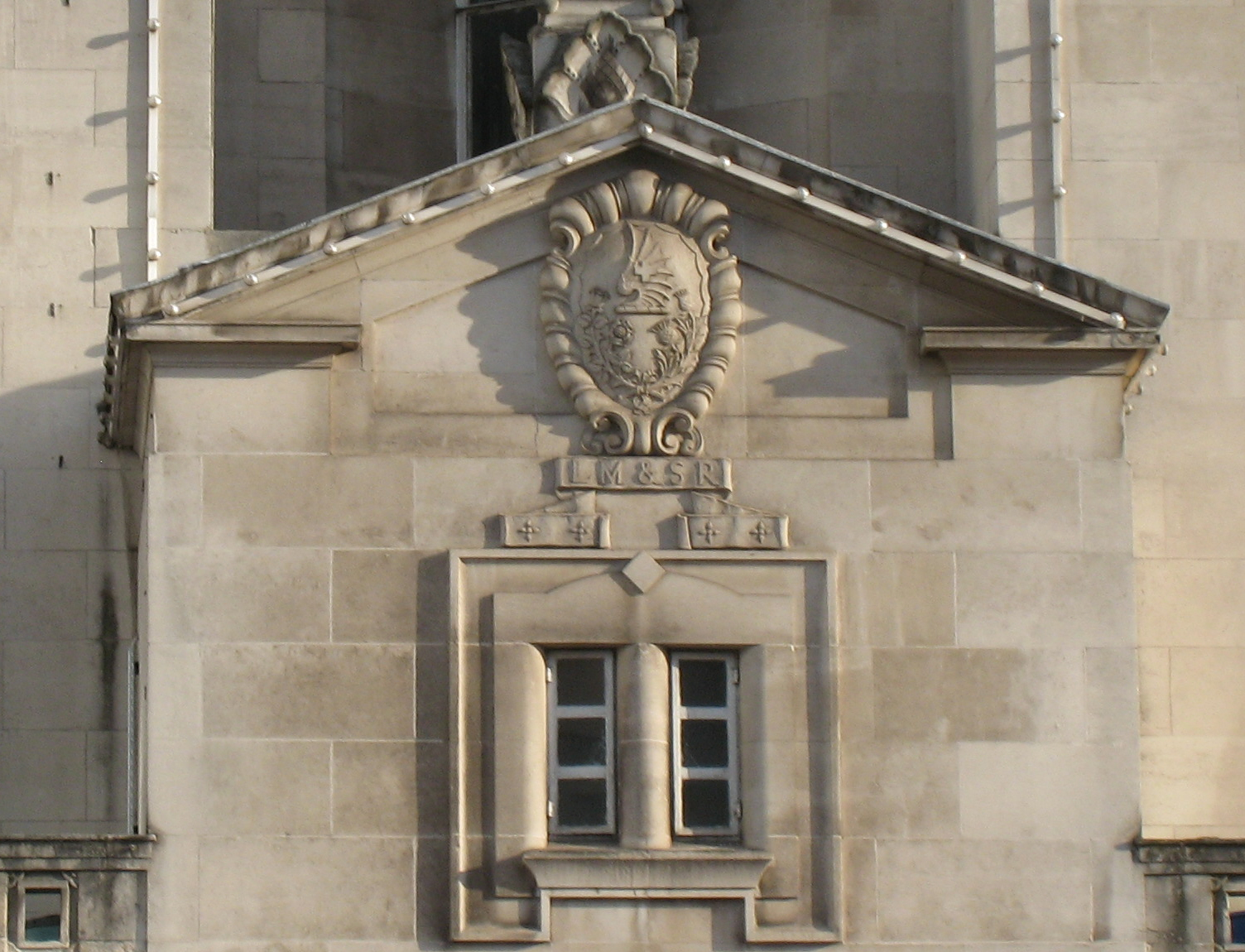
LM&SR crest on the hotel

== See also ==
- Listed buildings in Leeds (City and Hunslet Ward - northern area)
