= Howden Clough railway station =

Disused railway station in Howden Clough, West Riding of Yorkshire, England

Coordinates: 53.7359°N 1.6418°W

Howden Clough

General information
- Location: Howden Clough, West Riding of Yorkshire; England
- Platforms: 2

Other information
- Status: Disused

History
- Original company: Great Northern Railway
- Pre-grouping: Great Northern Railway
- Post-grouping: London and North Eastern Railway; British Railways (North Eastern Region)

Key dates
- 1 November 1866: Opened
- 1 December 1952: Closed
Location

Howden Clough railway station served Howden Clough, an area to the east of Birstall in the West Riding of Yorkshire, England, from 1866 to 1952 on the Batley to Adwalton Junction Line.

== History ==
The station was opened on 1 November 1866 by the Great Northern Railway. It was known as Howden Clough for Birstall in the LNER timetable in 1933, in the handbook of stations in 1938 and in Bradshaw until the station's closure. It closed on 1 December 1952. The nearby viaduct was demolished in 1972.

Preceding station	Disused railways	Following station
Upper Batley; Line and station closed	Great Northern Railway; Batley to Adwalton Junction Line	Terminus
