= Leeds Whitehall railway station =

Former railway station in Leeds, West Yorkshire, England

Leeds Whitehall

General information
- Location: Springwell Road, Holbeck; City of Leeds; England
- Coordinates: 53.789440°N 1.557230°W
- Grid reference: SE292326
- Owner: Railtrack
- Platforms: 1
- Train operators: Arriva Trains Northern

Other information
- Status: Demolished

Key dates
- 26 September 1999: Opened
- 24 February 2002: Closed
Location

Leeds Whitehall railway station was a temporary station that was built to the west of Leeds station in Leeds, England while the latter was rebuilt by Railtrack between 1999 and 2002. There was a need for the station itself to be closed during nights and at Christmas of 2000.

A temporary station was built on the Down Whitehall Line just off Springwell Road near the junction of Water Lane, in Holbeck, with a bus turning circle and bus stands outside the station. Bus services ran to ferry passengers from the industrial estate in which the station was placed to Leeds station. It opened on 26 September 1999.

A passenger welcome board stood at the junction of Water Lane and Springwell Road, informing passengers of this temporary station, the building work at Leeds station and other information. The colour scheme of the time was the standard white, grey and crimson colours of Railtrack. CCTV signs were placed around the site, warning that footage of people could be used in a court of law. The station consisted of a single platform that was mainly used by Arriva Trains Northern services to and from Manchester Airport between 12 am and 5 am; as well as some local services during daytime off-peak hours. The station also contained two Portakabin buildings; one was a waiting room and the other included toilets and office accommodation. Both buildings had impact-resistant walls and anti-vandal finishes.

The last passenger train to use the station called on 23 February 2002.
