= Euston House =

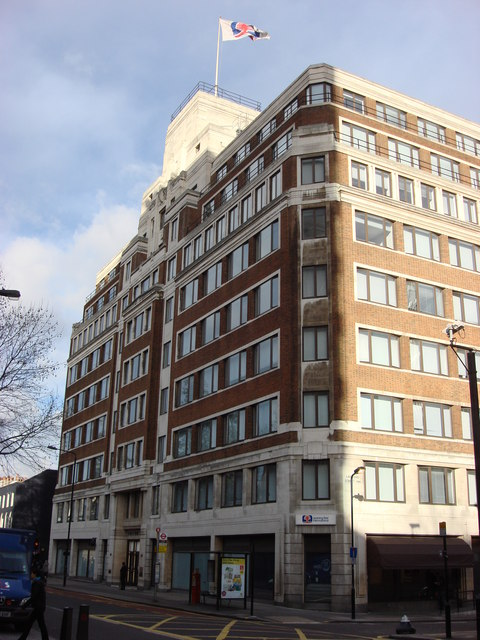
- Euston House, Eversholt Street

- Location within Greater London

General information
- Architectural style: Modernistic
- Location: Eversholt Street, London, England
- Coordinates: 51.528861°N 0.131515°W
- Construction started: 1933
- Completed: 1934
- Client: London, Midland and Scottish Railway

Design and construction
- Architect: Albert Victor Heal
- Engineer: Hurst Peirce & Malcolm

Euston House was built on Seymour Street, now Eversholt Street, in London in 1934 as the headquarters of the London, Midland and Scottish Railway. It was later the headquarters of the British Railways Board.

== History ==
It was built between 1933 and 1934 as the headquarters of the London, Midland and Scottish Railway, to designs by the architects Albert Victor Heal and William Henry Hamlyn. The LMS had recognised the need for several departments to work closely together and the new building was designed to accommodate 1,300 people on 9 floors. Half of the cost of construction was met by the Ministry of Transport in recognition of the company fulfilling its obligations under the scheme for the remission of passenger duty. Construction of the building required the demolition of the disused City and South London Railway entrance building to Euston Underground station.

The offices were opened by Hon. Oliver Stanley, Minister for Transport, on 12 February 1934.

The building later became the headquarters of the British Railways Board. Today, it is used as an adult educational facility by organisations including City Lit.
