= Cecil Greenwood Hare =

English architect and designer (1875–1932)

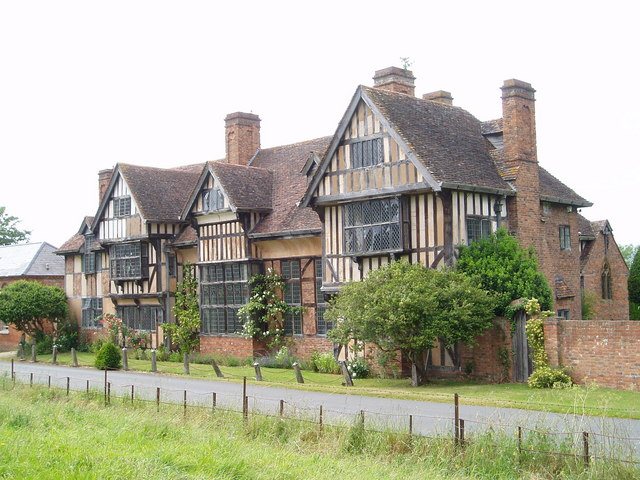
Wick Manor, Wick, Worcestershire dating from 1923 to 1924

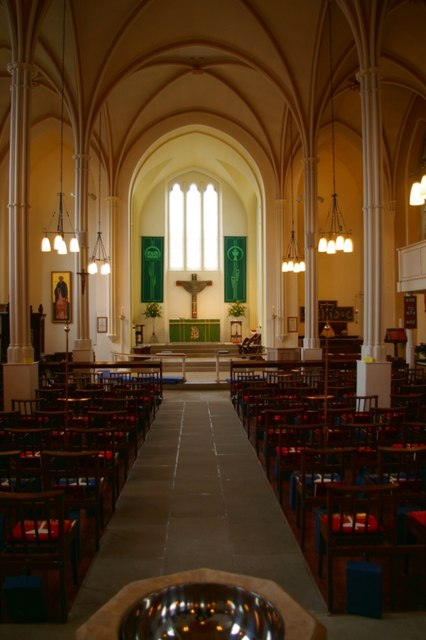
Chancel of St Mary and St Giles, Stony Stratford

Cecil Greenwood Hare (1875 – 14 July 1932) was an architect and designer based in England.

== Life ==
He was born in Stamford, Lincolnshire in 1875, the son of John Thomas Hare (1844–1902) and Mary Ann.

=== Bodley and Hare ===
Hare was a pupil of the architect George Frederick Bodley. Bodley, who designed in a Gothic Revival style, had a long partnership with Thomas Garner: this partnership was dissolved after Garner converted to Catholicism. Hare was Bodley's chief assistant, and finally went into partnership with him.

Bodley died in 1907. Hare is described in Bodley's will as his secretary and received a legacy of £400. His brief obituary in The Times describes him as Bodley's partner. He took over the practice of Bodley and Hare on Bodley's death.

Most of his own church work comprised fittings, and he produced output for Watts & Co.

=== Later work ===
He was partner of Albert Victor Heal from 1919 to 1924, by which time Heal (still calling himself Creed and Heal) and Bodley and Hare shared the same address at 11 Gray's Inn Square.

He died whilst the church of St Mildred, Addiscombe was being built, and a memorial to him was inserted in the church.

== Works ==
- St Peter's Church, Ealing, Lady Chapel reredos executed by Hare in 1921, as well as later choirstalls.
- St Benet's Church, Kentish Town, London, 1908–1928
- St Stephen's Church, Sneinton Extended 1909–1912
- Dokett Building, Queens' College, Cambridge 1912
- St John the Evangelist's Church, Middlesbrough, One-bay west extension to nave and aisles 1914
- Calvary War Memorial, St Stephen's Church, Sneinton, 1920
- Castle Donington War Memorial 1921
- County War Memorial, Nottingham 1922
- Wick (or Wyke) Manor, Worcestershire 1923–1924
- Church of St Mary and St Giles, High Street, Stony Stratford, chancel 1928
- St Mary's Church, Attenborough, choir stalls 1928
- St Mildred's Church, Addiscombe 1931–1937
- Walford War Memorial 1925
- Langrick War Memorial, 1920
