= County War Memorial, Nottingham =

Grade II listed structure in Nottingham, Nottinghamshire, England

- England
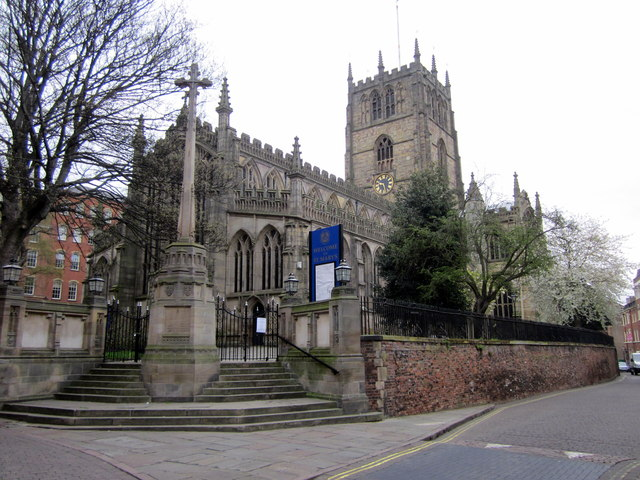
- For Men of Nottingham who died in the First World War.
- Unveiled: 20 April 1922
- Location: 52.950875°N 1.143851°W; Nottingham
- Designed by: Cecil Greenwood Hare

The County War Memorial, Nottingham is a Grade II listed structure in Nottingham in Nottinghamshire, England.

== History ==
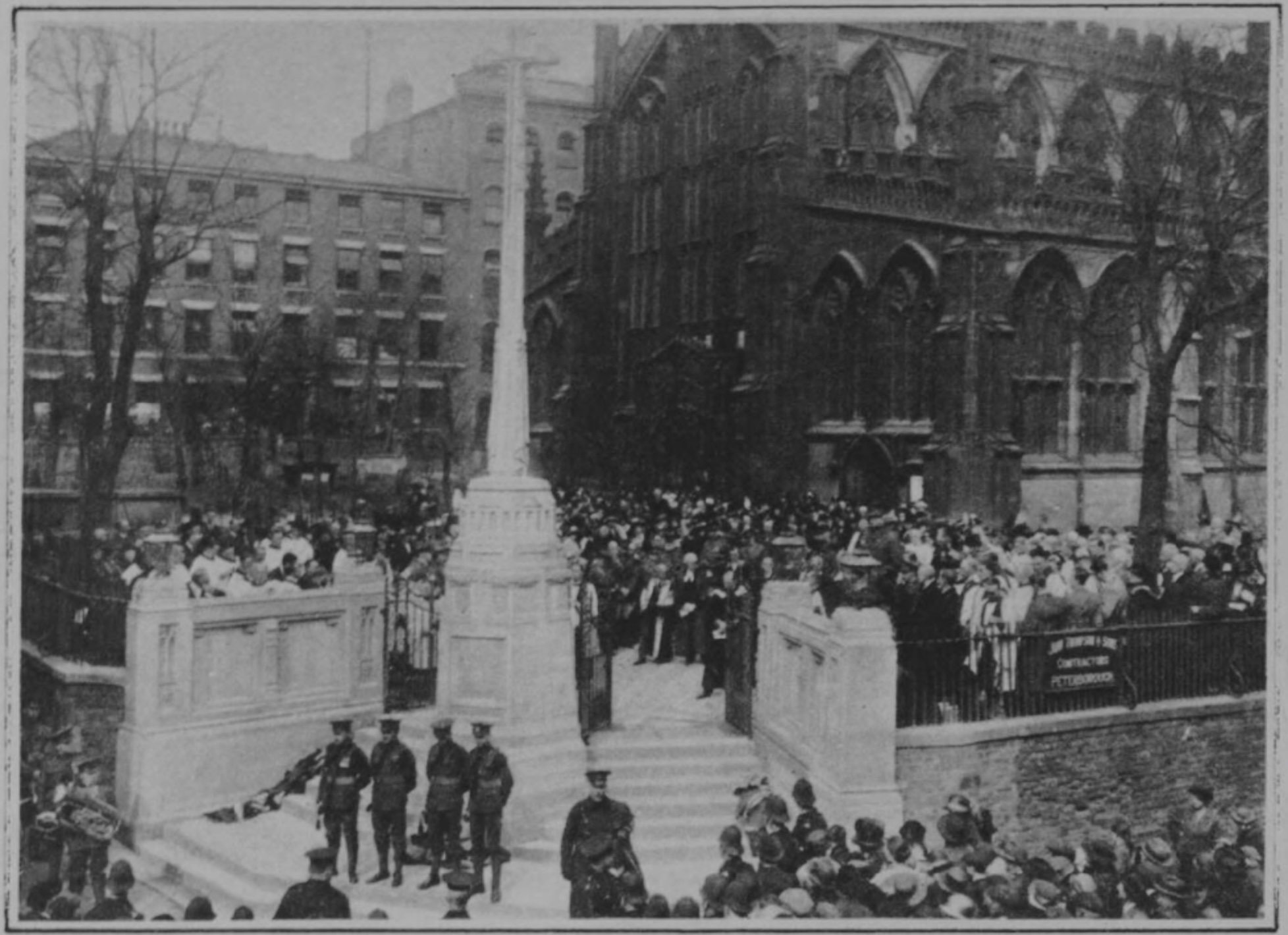
The unveiling from the Illustrated London News of 29 April 1922

The war memorial was designed by Cecil Greenwood Hare and unveiled on 20 April 1922 by George Monckton-Arundell, 7th Viscount Galway, Chairman of Nottinghamshire County Council. The Cross was dedicated by the Bishop of Southwell, Rt. Revd. Edwyn Hoskyns.

It was funded by public subscription to commemorate the 11,000 men of Nottingham and Nottinghamshire who died in the First World War. It stands as the entrance to St Mary's Church, Nottingham at the junction of High Pavement and St Mary's Gate.

It comprises a tall cross 29 feet (8.8 m) high in Whitby stone with a bronze sword on traceried octagonal base and stepped octagonal pedestal with inscribed tablet.

On either side is a tapering flight of steps, at the head of which is a pair of gates. Flanking the steps are walls with moulded coping and square pedestals with square iron lanterns. The inset tablets hold the names of parishes, towns and villages in the city and county.

The gate pillars hold raised tablets with the names of men and women from St Mary’s parish who died in the First World War.

The memorial was restored in 2008 when new inscribed panels were installed.
