= Earlsheaton railway station =

Disused railway station in West Yorkshire, England

Coordinates: 53.6835°N 1.6141°W

Earlsheaton was a railway station serving Earlsheaton in West Yorkshire. The station was on the Bradford, Wakefield and Leeds Railway. The station was opened in 1875 on the Great Northern's–– Dewsbury Loop. The line was extended to Batley by 1880.

The station was situated just east of Earlsheaton tunnel which led the railway beneath Sheep Hill. It had two platforms accessed by means of separate footpaths, both of which ultimately led to Earlsheaton Common. Facilities were on the eastbound platform.

The station closed to passengers in June 1953. The line closed altogether in 1965. The station buildings have been demolished and the former trackbed is now a cycle path.

Preceding station	Disused railways	Following station
Dewsbury Central	London and North Eastern Railway; Great Northern Railway	Ossett
