= Batley railway station =

Railway station in West Yorkshire, England

Batley
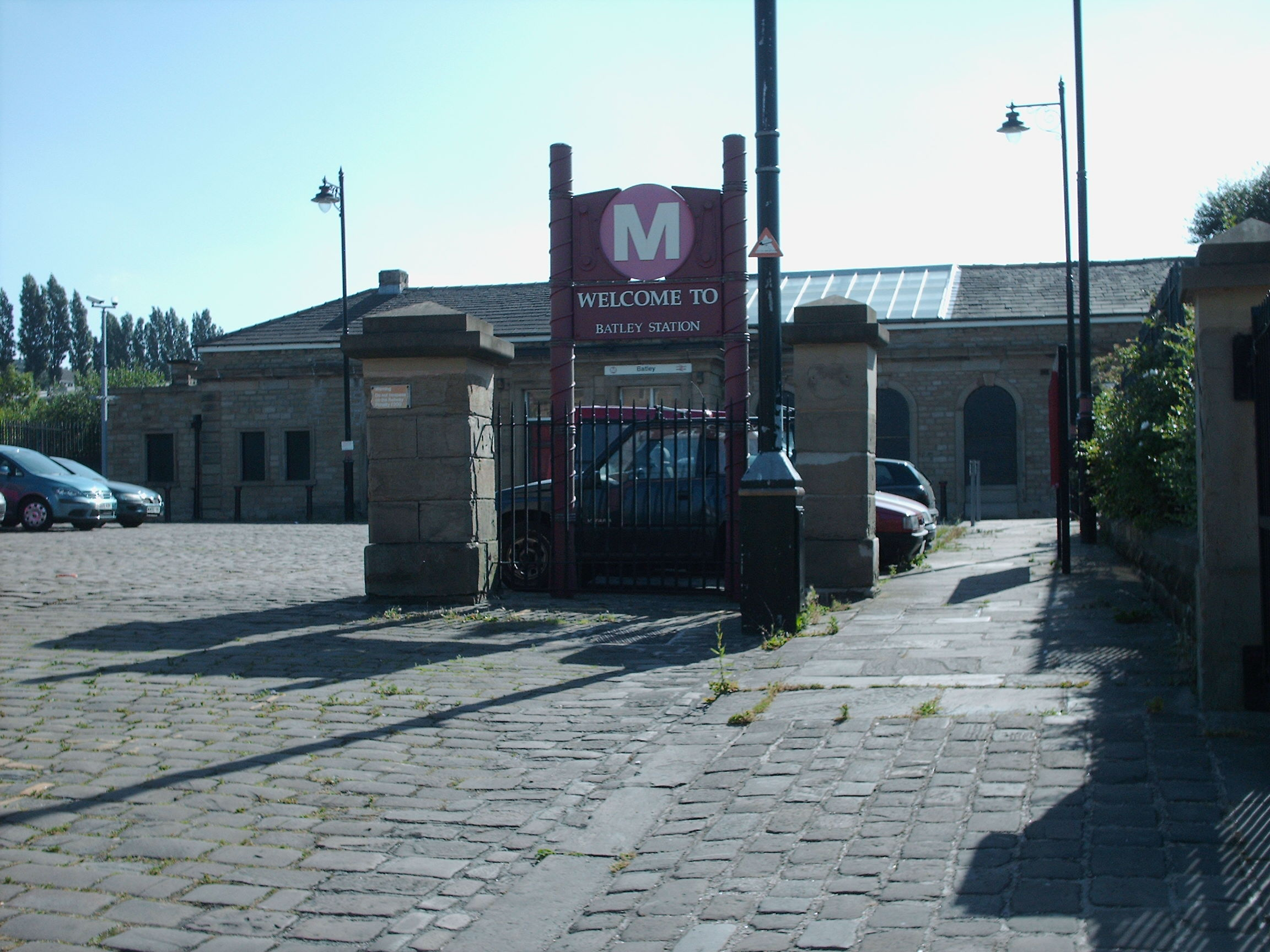
- The entrance

General information
- Location: Batley, Kirklees, England
- Coordinates: 53.709910°N 1.623020°W
- Grid reference: SE249237
- Managed by: Northern Trains
- Transit authority: West Yorkshire Metro
- Platforms: 2

Other information
- Station code: BTL
- Fare zone: 2
- Classification: DfT category F1

History
- Opened: 1848

Passengers
- 2020/21: ▼90,188
- 2021/22: ▲0.241 million
- 2022/23: ▲0.265 million
- 2023/24: ▼0.261 million
- 2024/25: ▼0.227 million
Location
Notes
- Passenger statistics from the Office of Rail and Road

Batley railway station serves the market town of Batley, in West Yorkshire, England. Situated 8 miles (13 km) south-west of Leeds on the main line to Huddersfield and Manchester, the station was opened by the London and North Western Railway in 1848.

The station is now managed by Northern Trains, which operates the service from Leeds to Wigan Wallgate via Manchester Victoria. Services via Huddersfield are provided by TransPennine Express.

== History ==
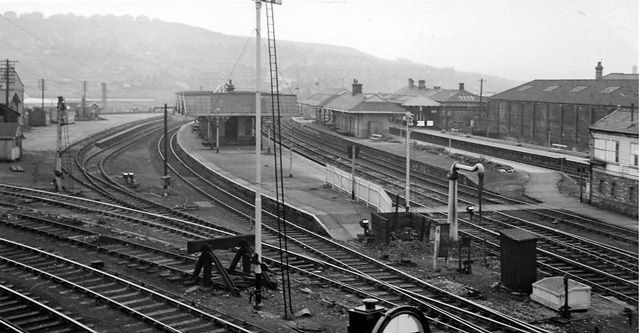
The station in 1961

The station was rather larger than it is today, as it was also served by the Great Northern Railway branch line from Bradford to Wakefield via Dewsbury Central from December 1864 to 7 September 1964, when it fell victim to the Beeching Axe. It was also the junction for branch lines to Birstall (opened in 1852, closed to passengers as a wartime economy measure in 1917 and to all traffic in 1963) and to Tingley and Beeston (opened in 1890, closed in 1951). The station was significantly enlarged, with the addition of three extra platforms, on the opening of the latter route in August 1890, but reverted to the present twin-platform configuration after the closure and abandonment of the Bradford-Wakefield line in 1964/5. Few traces of any of these routes remain today, but the abutments of the former bridge that took the Bradford line across the line from Leeds near Batley signal box (east of the station) can still be seen.

In June 2018, a protest was held by Batley and Spen MP Tracy Brabin following weeks of disruption to its services after Northern Trains announced the roll out of a new timetable. The Labour MP argued people who live in the north of the country are fed up of being at the bottom of the pile when it comes to transport investment.

In 2023, Network Rail announced plans to replace the Lady Anne level crossing with a footbridge, and to demolish the signal box, as part of a programme of work to upgrade the TransPennine Line.

== Facilities ==
Batley railway station is unstaffed. The main buildings on the eastbound platform 1 are used as a waiting area and entrance; there is a self-service ticket machine. Platform 2 has a shelter. Both platforms have digital display screens and timetable posters showing train service information. Only platform 1 has step-free access; the subway to platform 2 has stairways.

Car parking is available for travellers directly outside the station entrance.

== Services ==
Services at Batley are operated by Northern Trains, with the following general off-peak weekday service in trains per hour:

- 2tph to Leeds
- 1tph to Bradford Interchange
- 1tph to Wigan Wallgate, via Manchester Victoria.

Preceding station	National Rail	Following station
Dewsbury	TransPennine Express; North TransPennine (Huddersfield - Leeds)	Morley
Dewsbury	Northern Trains; Wigan North Western - Leeds	Morley
	Disused railways	
Upper Batley; Line and station closed	Great Northern Railway; Batley Branch; Chickenley Heath Branch	Chickenley Heath; Line and station closed
Upper Batley; Line and station closed	Great Northern Railway; Batley Branch; Dewsbury & Batley Branch	Batley Carr; Line and station closed

== Gallery ==
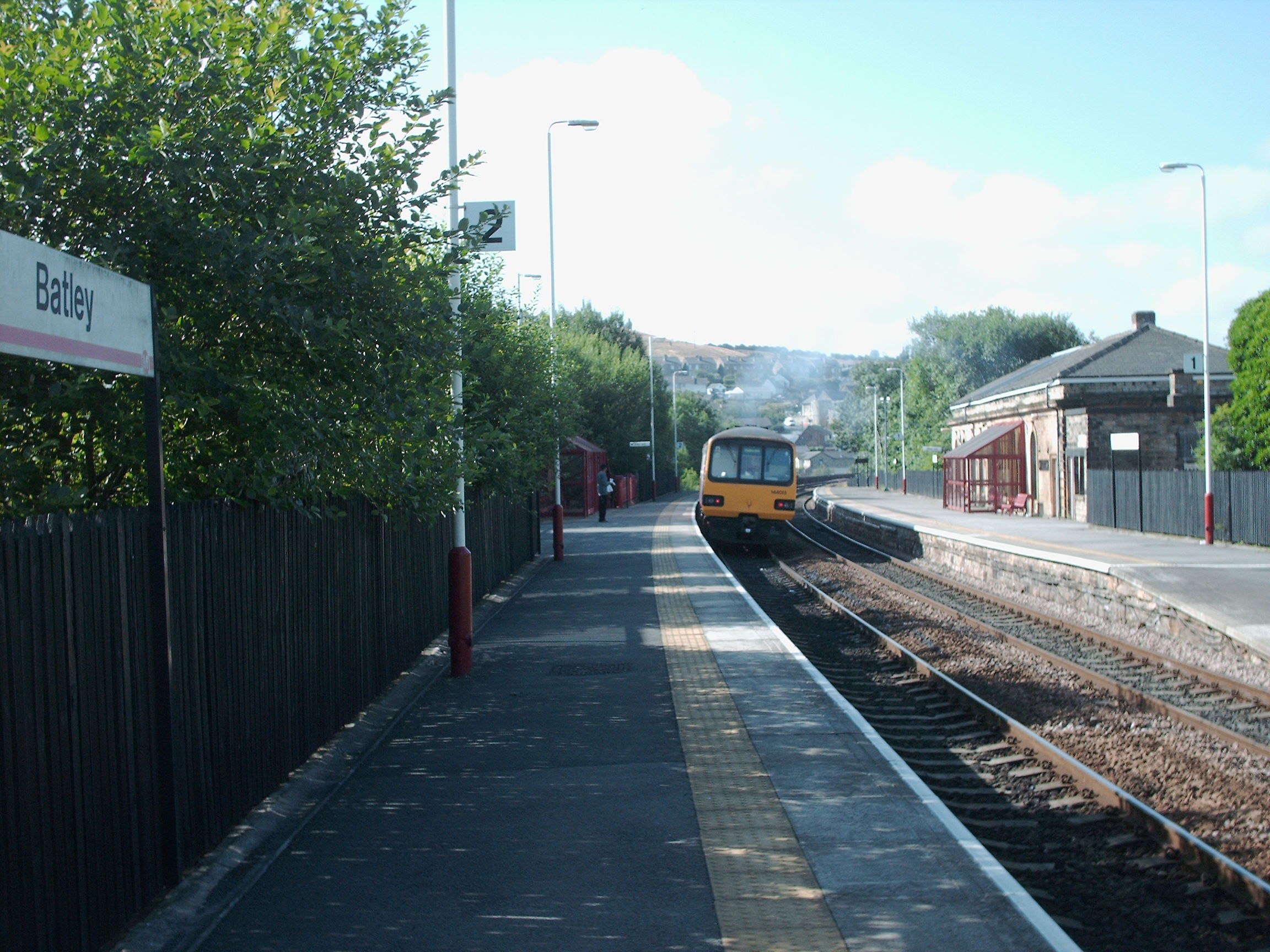
Platform 2 in 2006

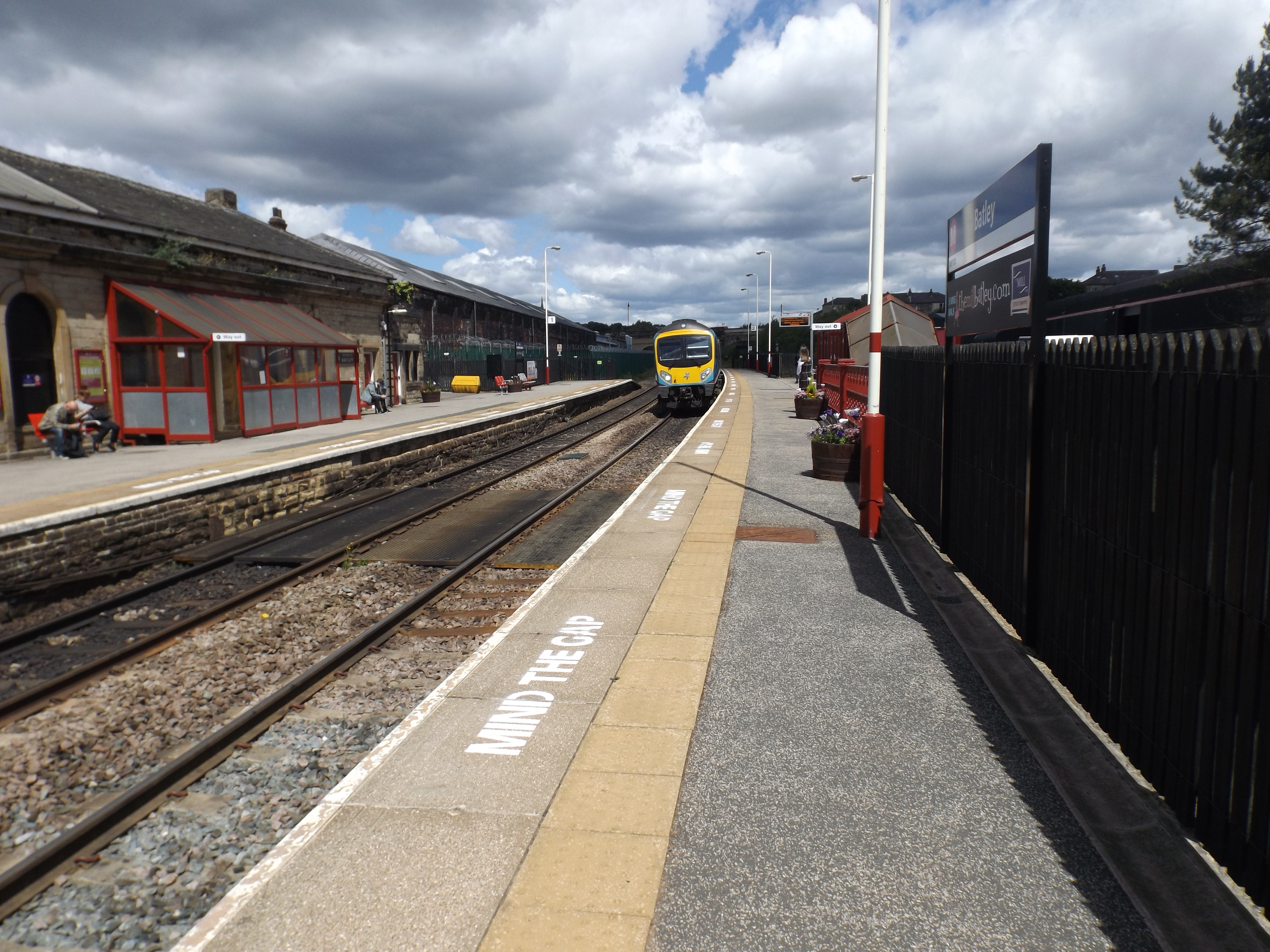
Platform 2 in 2018

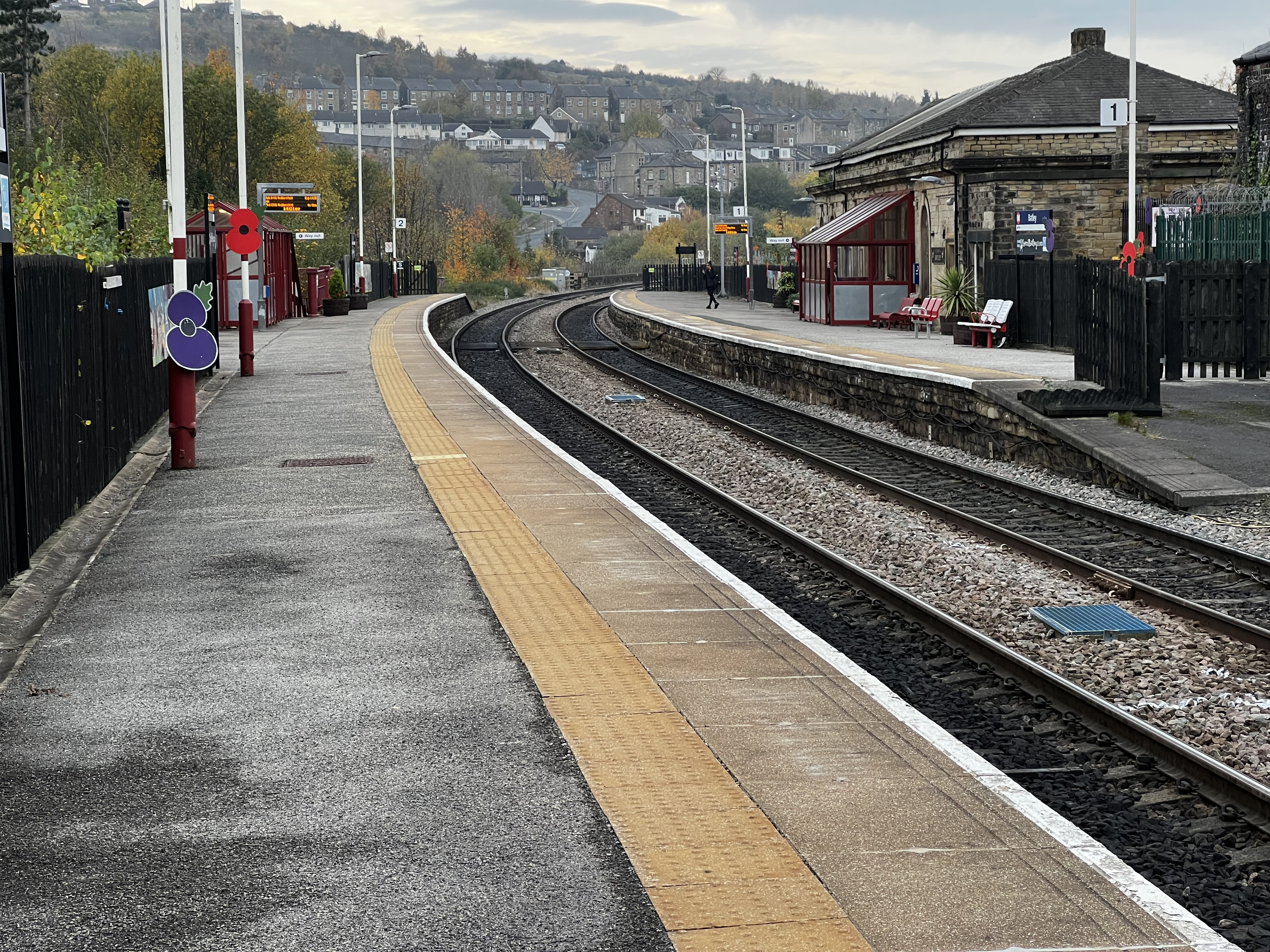
Platform 2 in 2021
