= LMS School of Transport =

Conference centre in Derby, United Kingdom

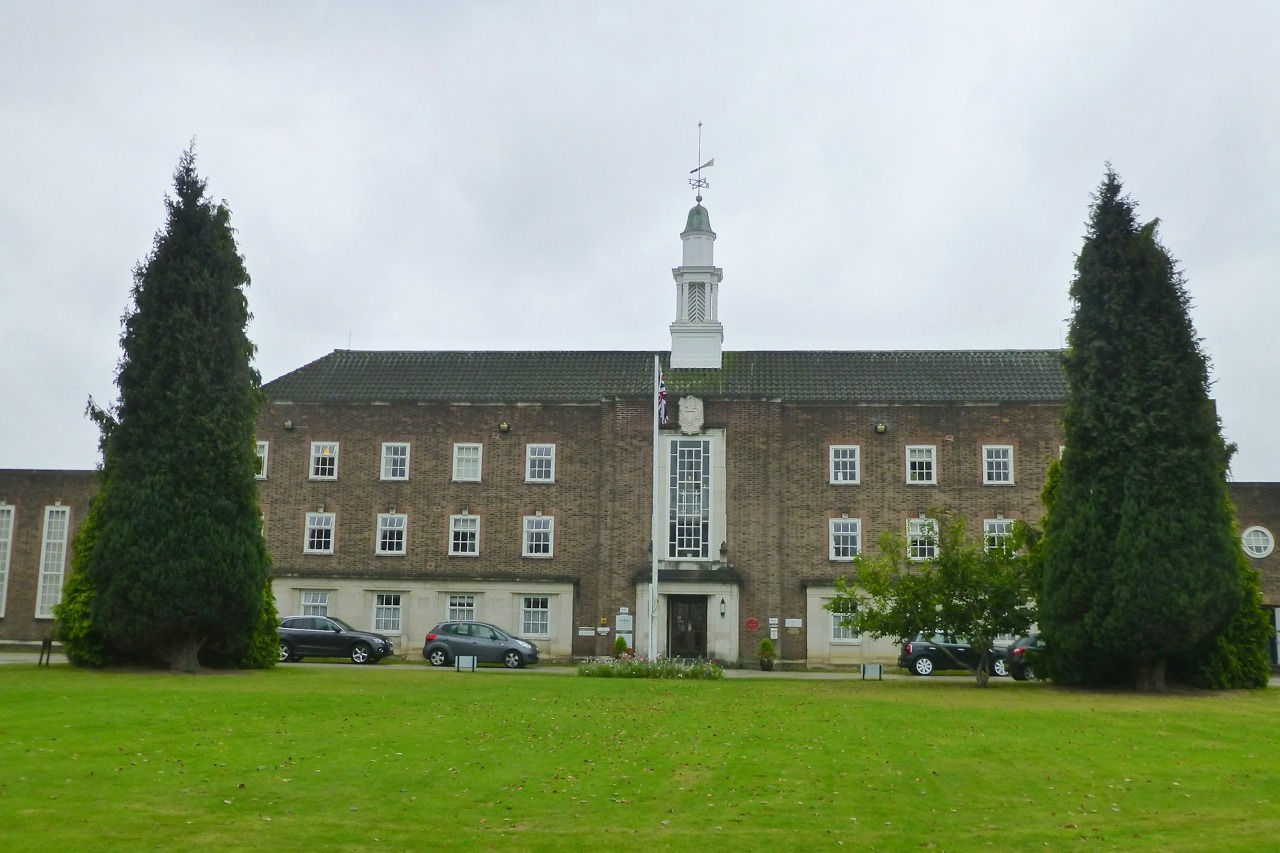
- View from London Road

- Location within Derbyshire

General information
- Architectural style: Neo Georgian
- Classification: Grade II listed
- Location: Derby, Derbyshire, London Road, England
- Coordinates: 52°54′15.6″N 1°26′54.3″W
- Current tenants: Derby Conference Centre
- Opened: 22 July 1938
- Cost: £50,000 (equivalent to £2,910,000 in 2025)
- Client: London, Midland and Scottish Railway

Technical details
- Floor count: 3

Design and construction
- Architect: William Henry Hamlyn

The LMS School of Transport was built between 1937 and 1938 by the London, Midland and Scottish Railway in Derby, Derbyshire and is now a Grade II listed building used as the Derby Conference Centre.

== History ==
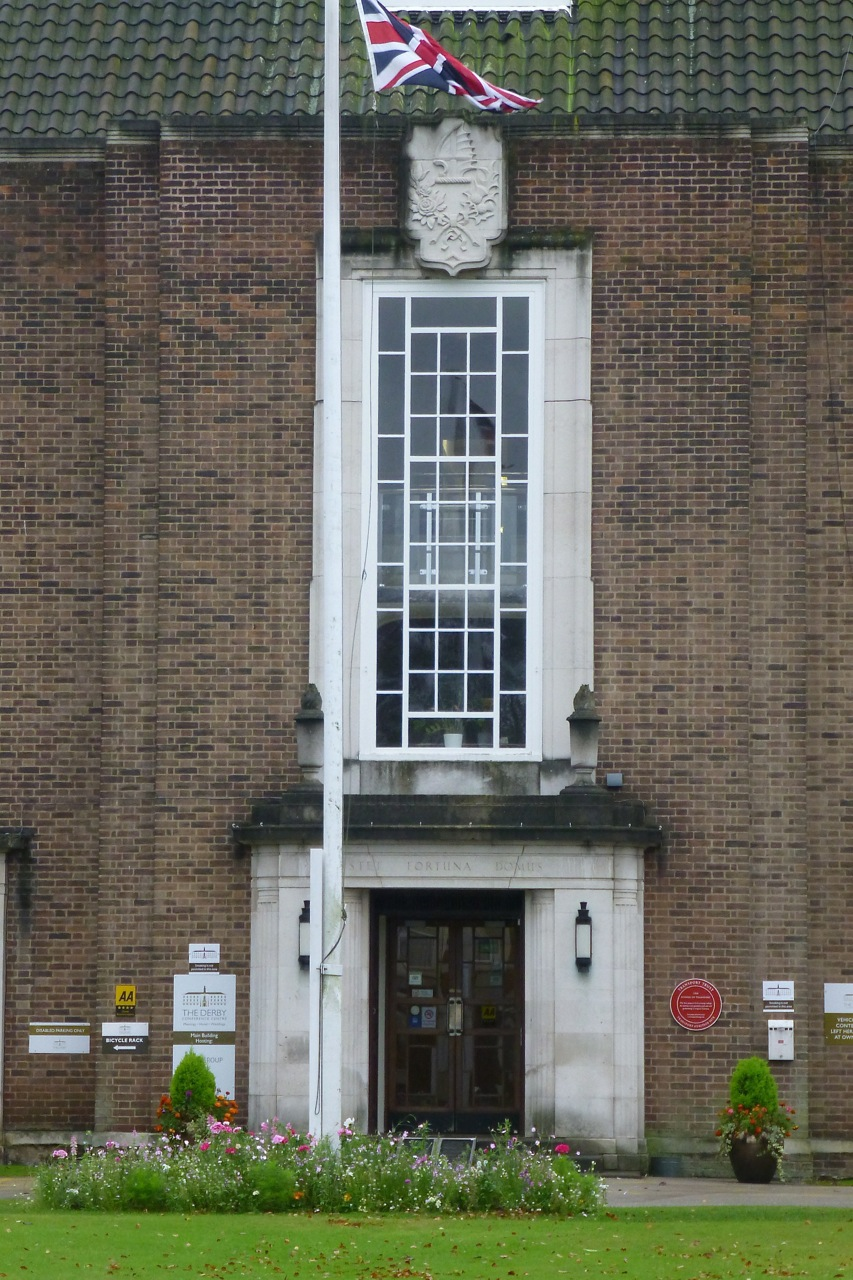
Entrance and stair well window

The requirements for a School of Transport were announced in November 1936 by the London, Midland and Scottish Railway for the purposes of training 50 students at a time in the best practices of railway work. Derby was chosen as the site of the school because it was geographically central in the LMS empire, and would enable students to visit the sidings, control office, workshops and other places where they could practice some of the things they were studying.

The foundation stone was laid by Sir Josiah Stamp on 22 September 1937.

It was designed by the company architect, William Henry Hamlyn and is dominated by the centrepiece of the facade, the entrance portico, with a full height staircase window and roof lantern. A Portland stone arcade with bas-reliefs by Denis Dunlop runs along the first floor. It opened on 22 July 1938 by the Minister of Transport, Leslie Burgin.

The LMS commissioned various art works for the building. Just inside the main entrance, they installed two mural panels by Norman Wilkinson, one showing an LMS steam ferry, the other three steam locomotives, depicting progress from Stephenson's Rocket to the Princess Coronation Pacific. In the lounge, William Henry Hamlyn designed a mural which shows the development of road and rail transport from 1838 to 1938. It was executed by John Carter, John Ferguson Cooper and Harold Haynes Matthews.

The main Hall of Transport in the building contained a large O gauge railway which was used for educational purposes. It survived until the 1960s.

The first principal of the School was Colonel Lionel Manton.

The school closed as a school for the duration of the Second World War and was used by the Royal Engineers. It was re-opened on 4 March 1946 under its first principal. In 1948 it became the British Rail School of Transport.

In 1956 it was expanded with a diesel traction demonstration building and new courses in engineering. In 1976 it was renamed The Railway Engineering School for signalling, telecommunications and electronics. In 1991 a conference suite was constructed for British Rail's Quality and Safety Services Department. In 1994, the British Rail Civil Engineering Training Centre transferred from Watford and the Railway Engineering School, Derby Signalling, and Telecomms Training Centres at six other locations amalgamated to form the College of Railway Technology, relaunched four years later in 1998 as Catalis Rail Training Ltd.

After closure in 2007, the building was adapted to become Derby Conference Centre.
