= William Henry Hamlyn =

British architect

- Born: 16 February 1889; Wigan, Lancashire, England
- Died: Devon
- Occupation: Architect
- Employer: London, Midland and Scottish Railway
- Notable work: Luton railway station, Queens Hotel, Leeds

William Henry Hamlyn FRIBA (16 February 1889 – 1968) was an architect based in England noted for his buildings for the London Midland and Scottish Railway.

He was born in Wigan in Lancashire. He studied architecture with Reginald Wynn Owen in Liverpool and later at the Royal Academy School.

He entered railway service in 1911 initially with the London and North Western Railway. He was elected a fellow of the Royal Institute of British Architects in 1934 and became the chief architect for the London, Midland and Scottish Railway company. He drew up plans with Percy Thomas for the rebuilding of Euston railway station in 1936, but the outbreak of the Second World War resulted in their cancellation

He designed a series of pre-fabricated railway stations which were built on blitz-damaged station sites from 1945 onwards. A prototype was erected at Queen’s Park railway station and the first installation was destined for Bootle New Strand railway station.

He retired in 1949 and died in 1968.

== List of works ==
- Becontree railway station 1932
- South Kenton railway station 1933
- Euston House 1934 with Albert Victor Heal
- Queens Hotel, Leeds 1937 with William Curtis Green
- Railway company offices, station concourse and ticket office of Leeds City station 1938
- Hoylake railway station 1938
- Extension of the dining room at the Midland Hotel, Derby 1938
- Apsley railway station 1938
- Luton railway station 1939
- Lea Hall railway station 1939
- Prestatyn hoiiday camp 1939
- LMS School of Transport, Derby 1937 - 1939 (now Derby Conference Centre) London Road, Alvaston, Derby DE24 8UX
- West Hampstead Thameslink railway station (originally at Queens Park, Kilburn) 1945 replaced in 2011
