= Chickenley =

Suburban village in West Yorkshire, England

Coordinates: 53.688°N 1.600°W

- Location within West Yorkshire
- Population: 3,090
- OS grid reference: SE 26546 21388
- Metropolitan borough: Kirklees
- Metropolitan county: West Yorkshire
- Region: Yorkshire and the Humber
- Country: England
- Sovereign state: United Kingdom
- Post town: DEWSBURY
- Postcode district: WF12
- Police: West Yorkshire
- Fire: West Yorkshire
- Ambulance: Yorkshire
- UK Parliament: Dewsbury

Chickenley is a suburban village in the Borough of Kirklees, West Yorkshire, England. It is part of Dewsbury after being originally a farming hamlet, half-way between Ossett and Dewsbury.

In 1356 it was variously called Chekynlay and Chikynlay.

The Chickenley name could derive from a family name originating during early settlement, corrupted to "Chick" over the years. An old story is that when a maypole was built in the Gawthorpe area of Ossett in 1840, men from Chickenley came to tear it down. Some of the early settlers to the area were a family of Italian tinkers, the Cascarinos and also of Irish origin the Taylors; these family names still exist in the area. After the Second World War a council estate was built in the area. The estate is the largest in Dewsbury and has a doctors and shops within it.

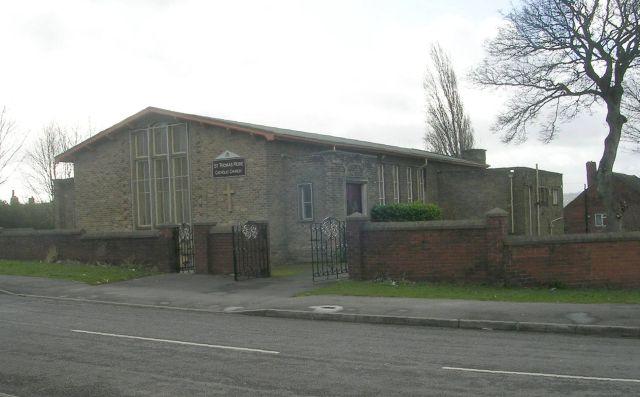
St Thomas More Catholic Church, Chickenley

Chickenley has no Church of England church, although there is St Thomas More Catholic Church, opposite Chickenley Community School on Chickenley Lane. Until recently the estate was linked with the Gawthorpe area of Ossett as part of a Church of England parish. However, it is now part of the large parish of Dewsbury, which has several churches within its area. Gawthorpe's St Mary's Church C.of E. church was at the border with Ossett, but was demolished in March 2011.

The local elections of 4 May 2006 saw the BNP gain the "Dewsbury East" ward, which includes the estate - but the seat was regained by the Labour Party in the 5 May 2007 election.
