= Albert Victor Heal =

British architect

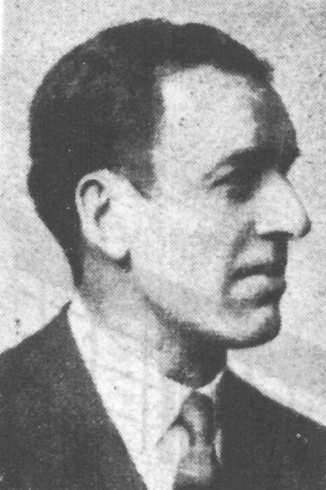
- Image from the Shields Daily Gazette 1 April 1938
- Born: 6 May 1887
- Died: 1975 (aged 87–88)
- Occupations: Architect and designer

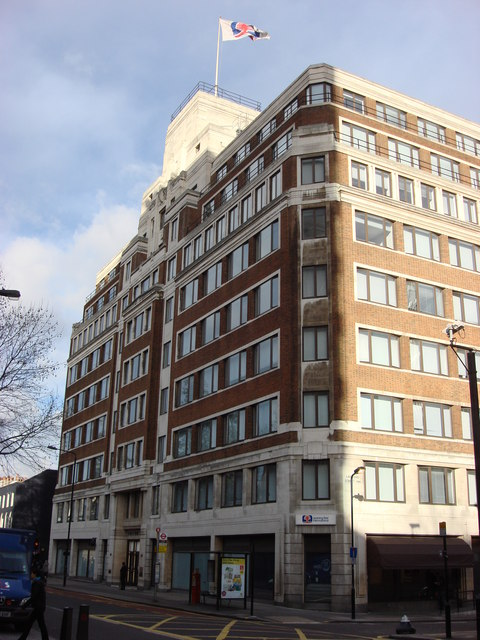
Euston House, Eversholt Street, London. Built in 1934 for the London Midland and Scottish Railway

Albert Victor Heal MC FRIBA (6 May 1887 – 1975) was an architect and designer based in England.

== Life ==
He was born on 6 May 1887. He married Florence Isabel Reynolds.

He worked in the offices of Rattee and Kett from 1904 to 1906. He was articled to Bodley and Hare from 1906 to 1913. He was assistant to Richard T Creed from 1913. He took over the practice of Richard Creed on his death in 1914.

During the First World War he served with the Royal Field Artillery and Suffolk Yeomanry, and was awarded the Military Cross.

He was in partnership with Cecil Greenwood Hare between 1919 and 1924.

He was appointed a Fellow of the Royal Institute of British Architects in November 1927.

In the 1950s he entered partnership with R V Smith, and the company was known as Victor Heal & Partners.

== Works ==
- Little Bardfield Hall, Essex, restoration work 1919 – 1920
- All Saints’ Church, Southsea, (with Cecil Greenwood Hare) 1922
- 32 Grosvenor Square West, restoration 1922 - 1923
- Parham Park, Sussex, restoration, 1922 – 1925
- Lazard's Bank, Old Broad Street, restoration (with Gunton & Gunton) 1926
- St Mark's Church, Camberwell, 1931 (now New Peckham Mosque)
- Higginson & Co, Cornhill and Lombard Street 1932
- St Mildrid’s Church, Addiscombe 1933 (completed after the death of Cecil Greenwood Hare)
- Parham Church, Sussex, restoration, 1933-1934
- Euston House, Eversholt Street, 1934
- Columbine hangar, East Cowes, Isle of Wight designed in May 1935 for Saunders-Roe Ltd
- Fielden House, Little College Street, 1936
- Oak Reredos, St Peter’s Church, Eastbourne 1936
- Newspaper House, Victoria Road, Swindon 1937
- Church Hall, St Augustine’s, Bromley Common 1938
- The Shields Daily Gazette Offices, Barrington Street, South Shields 1938 (with F.W. Newby - demolished ca. 2014)
- Fargate House, 21 Fargate, Sheffield 1938
- Bank of England (Southampton?) 1940
- Roborough House, Plymouth, 1941
- Bank Buildings, 1 Lothbury, London, 1950s (now a branch of the Bank of China)
- Wiggonholt Church, Sussex, restoration, 1952
- Bank of England Chambers/New Change Buildings, New Change, London, 1953-1960 (Demolished)
- Overbury Court, Worcestershire, additions. 1959
- Bank, Princes Street, 1949-1962
- Alterations to Baillie Scott House in Sevenoaks, Kent, 1968 by Victor Heal & Partners
