= Ossett railway station =

Disused railway station in West Yorkshire, England

Coordinates: 53.6766°N 1.5771°W

Ossett was a railway station serving the town of Ossett, West Yorkshire. The station on the Bradford, Wakefield and Leeds Railway and it opened on 2 April 1864 and closed on 5 September 1964. It had an island platform accessed from a ramp surrounded by goods yards. After closure the tracks were lifted, and the area has been built over with housing.

Preceding station	Disused railways	Following station
Earlsheaton	London and North Eastern Railway; Great Northern Railway	Flushdyke
