= Gildersome West railway station =

Disused railway station in Gildersome, West Yorkshire

Gildersome West
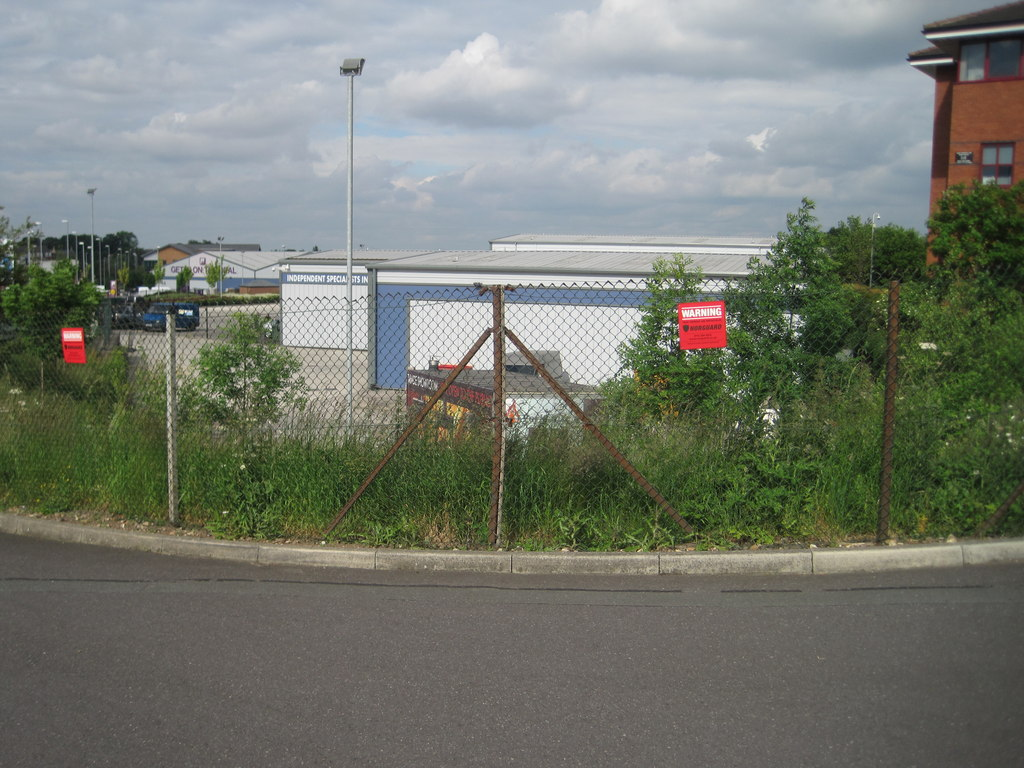
- The site of the station in 2014

General information
- Location: Gildersome, City of Leeds; England
- Coordinates: 53.7507°N 1.6328°W
- Grid reference: SE243283
- Platforms: 2

Other information
- Status: Disused

History
- Original company: Leeds, Bradford and Halifax Junction Railway
- Pre-grouping: Great Northern Railway
- Post-grouping: LNER; British Railways (North Eastern Region)

Key dates
- 20 August 1856: Opened as Gildersome
- 2 March 1951: Name changed to Gildersome West
- 13 June 1955: Closed to passengers
- 1968: Closed to goods
Location

Gildersome West railway station served the village of Gildersome, West Yorkshire, England, from 1856 to 1968 on the Leeds, Bradford and Halifax Junction Railway.

== History ==
The station opened as Gildersome on 20 August 1856 by the Leeds, Bradford and Halifax Junction Railway. Its name was changed to Gildersome West on 2 March 1951 to avoid confusion with another station of the same name further north. The station closed to passengers on 13 June 1955 and closed to goods in 1968.

Preceding station	Historical railways	Following station
Drighlington and Adwalton; Line and station closed	Leeds, Bradford and Halifax Junction Railway	Morley Top; Line and station closed
