= Morley railway station =

Railway station in West Yorkshire, England

Morley
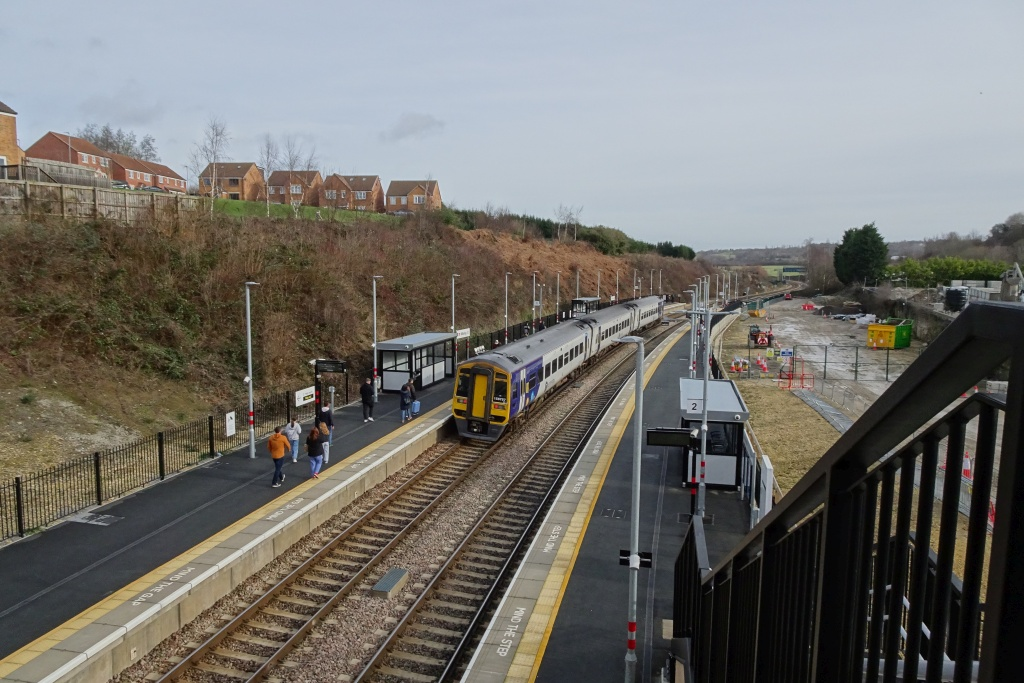
- Morley railway station, 2025

General information
- Location: Morley, City of Leeds; England
- Coordinates: 53.7497°N 1.5915°W
- Grid reference: SE270282
- Manager: Northern
- Transit authority: West Yorkshire Metro
- Platforms: 2

Other information
- Station code: MLY
- Fare zone: 2
- Classification: DfT category F1

History
- Original company: London and North Western Railway
- Pre-grouping: London and North Western Railway
- Post-grouping: London, Midland and Scottish Railway

Key dates
- 15 September 1848: Station opened as Morley
- 30 September 1951: Renamed Morley Low
- ?: Renamed Morley
- 26 June 2023: Resited

Passengers
- 2020/21: ▼0.105 million
- 2021/22: ▲0.286 million
- 2022/23: ▲0.327 million
- 2023/24: ▼0.308 million
- 2024/25: ▼0.274 million
Location
Notes
- Passenger statistics from the Office of Rail and Road

Morley railway station serves the town of Morley in West Yorkshire, England.

The station is on the Huddersfield Line and is currently operated by Northern. It is located approximately 5 miles (8 km) south-west of Leeds at the northern end of the 3,369-yard (3,081 m) Morley Tunnel which passes beneath the town.

== History ==
Morley railway station was opened by the London and North Western Railway on 15 September 1848. Originally named Morley, it was renamed Morley Low on 30 September 1951, owing to it being far below the town, under which the Morley Tunnel passes.

The town's other station (known as "Morley Top"), which was situated nearer to the town centre and served by trains on the Bradford-to-Ardsley line of the Great Northern Railway, was closed by British Railways on 2 January 1961.

In 2003, plans were in place to upgrade Morley station's facilities by introducing cycle stands, CCTV, and improvements to the car park. As only one platform is accessible to disabled people Morley Town Council lobbied (unsuccessfully) to have the upgrade include the installation of wheelchair ramps to platform 2. Only the cycle stands were completed at that time. In January 2011, plans were laid out once again for CCTV cameras to be installed, and these were installed in the following months.

== Patronage growth ==
Patronage at Morley station has increased remarkably in recent years; this is shown in the annual figures published by the Office of Rail Regulation (ORR).

Recorded usage in 2002/03 was 27,296 journeys per year (average of entries and exists). By 2005/06 this had increased to 68,664 journeys per year, an increase of 252% in four years. The figures for 2010/11 increased by 21% on the previous year, to 328,558 journeys per year. Actual growth may be higher since the ORR data does not accurately take account of the multi-modal 'MetroCard' season tickets issued by the West Yorkshire Combined Authority, which are valid for journeys to and from this station.

== Current problems ==
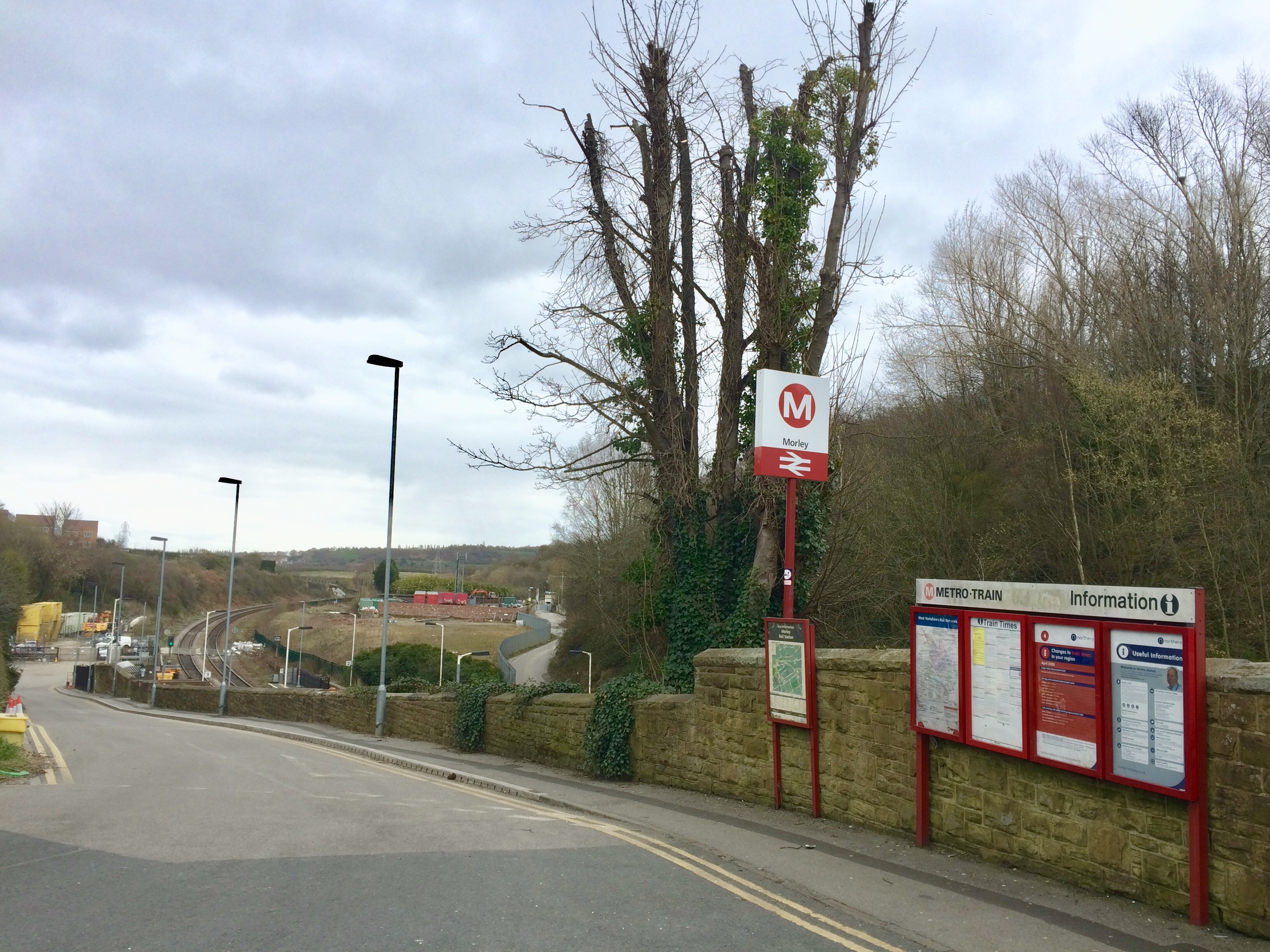
Entrance to the station

The increase in demand, combined with growth elsewhere on the line, means that overcrowding in the morning peak, particularly for commuters heading towards Leeds, is becoming more of an issue.

Despite this commuter growth little had been done to bring this station up to current high standards. For example, only one platform is accessible for disabled passengers, there is insufficient parking, access routes to and from the station are often overgrown with weeds, and there are frequent drainage problems which all combine to make the station not as pleasant as other stations in West Yorkshire. In 2012 a "Friends of Morley station" group was formed, and is addressing some of these issues. Work to improve the car park and drainage commenced in February 2013.

The Morley Observer & Advertiser stated on 12 January 2011 that plans are now in place to improve the station, starting with the installation of CCTV. This was later put in place.

The outlying location of the station could put some users off as it is a ten to fifteen minutes walk from the centre of Morley. The shortest walking route being via Queen Street, Ackroyd Street and then via the station steps (approx. 90) to the side of the Miners Arms Pub.

The nearest bus service to the station is the 46 operated by First. This runs along King George Avenue and New Bank Street. The nearest stops are only a few minutes walk away.

There's no taxi rank at the station, but there are a number of local cab firms in the area.

An improved station, 246 feet (75 m) from the current one, is planned to be opened in the summer of 2023. In 2023, relocation of the station about 240 ft (73 m) from its current position was underway to allow for longer platforms at the resited station. From 17 to 25 June 2023, engineers completed a number of major upgrades at Morley Station which included the construction of new platforms, the initiation of old platform demolition, a full signalling recontrol to Network Rail's York Rail Operating Centre and the installation of a brand-new footbridge.

== Services ==
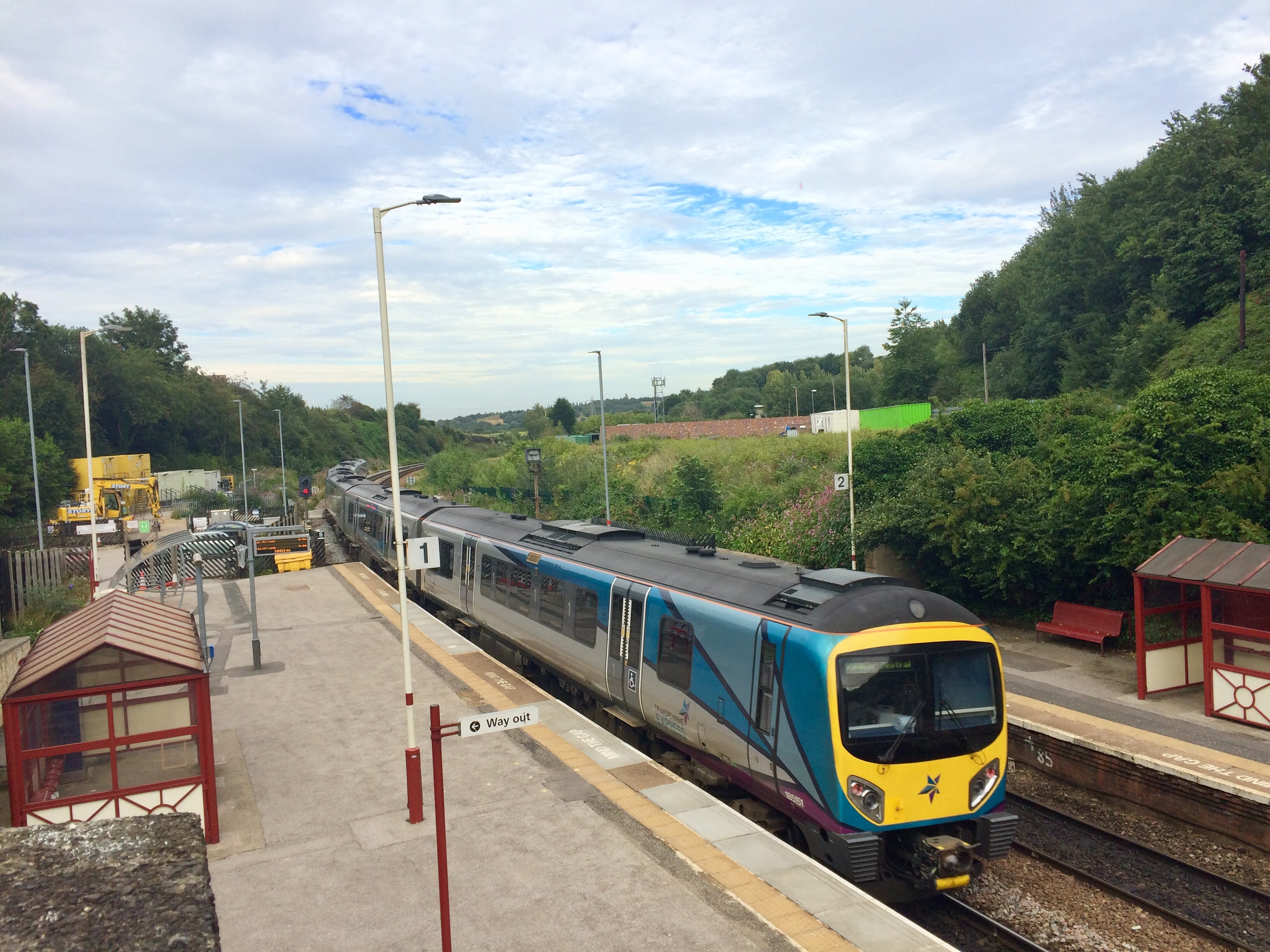
A TransPennine Express Class 185 leaves Platform 1 in 2020

Morley railway station is on the Huddersfield Line. From September 2025, the station is served by two separate hourly services throughout the day. Northern provide a half-hourly service mostly between Leeds and Brighouse; with one service terminating at Brighouse, and the second continuing to Manchester Victoria. TPE services now extend to Hull eastbound and Manchester Piccadilly westbound.

On Sundays, TransPennine Express provide an hourly stopping service between Huddersfield and Leeds. No Northern services operate on Sundays.

Preceding station	National Rail	Following station
Batley	TransPennine Express; North TransPennine (Huddersfield - Leeds)	Cottingley
Batley	Northern Trains; Wigan North Western - Leeds	Cottingley

== Tickets ==
Ticket machines have been provided on both platforms and these have recently been brought into use. It is expected that Morley will become a penalty fare station in due course. Passengers can also purchase tickets from the conductor on the train if they have not booked in advance.

On some occasions staff are on hand to sell tickets. This would otherwise present a problem at peak times, as one person cannot possibly sell tickets to every passenger on a crowded train; passengers travelling into Leeds therefore would have to queue up at the excess fares kiosk in Leeds to purchase tickets on arrival, in order to pass through the ticket barriers. It is, however, possible to buy tickets to or from Morley in the usual way at any staffed station, with the nearest staffed stations being Dewsbury and Leeds. It is also possible to buy mobile tickets in advance online using the Northern App. Northern (train operating company).

An alternative is to purchase a 'MetroCard' season ticket offered by West Yorkshire Metro. As Morley is in Zone 2, all MetroCard tickets that include rail travel are valid at Morley. National Rail also offers a wide selection of rail-only season tickets, allowing unlimited travel between Morley and another named station.

West Yorkshire residents who hold a Metro-issued Concessionary Pass are entitled, after 09:30, to purchase a ticket for any rail journey wholly within West Yorkshire for half the normal fare. This can be combined with a standard ticket beyond West Yorkshire, and hence longer journeys can also be made slightly cheaper. For example, travelling from Morley to Manchester Victoria costs significantly less by travelling to Todmorden on the concessionary rate, leaving only the relatively short Todmorden to Manchester journey to be paid for in full.

== Notes and references ==
- Haigh, A. (1978 reprint) The Railways of Yorkshire - A New Edition Dalesman Publishing, Clapham, North Yorkshire. ISBN 0-85206-459-4
