= Woodkirk railway station =

Disused railway station in West Yorkshire, England

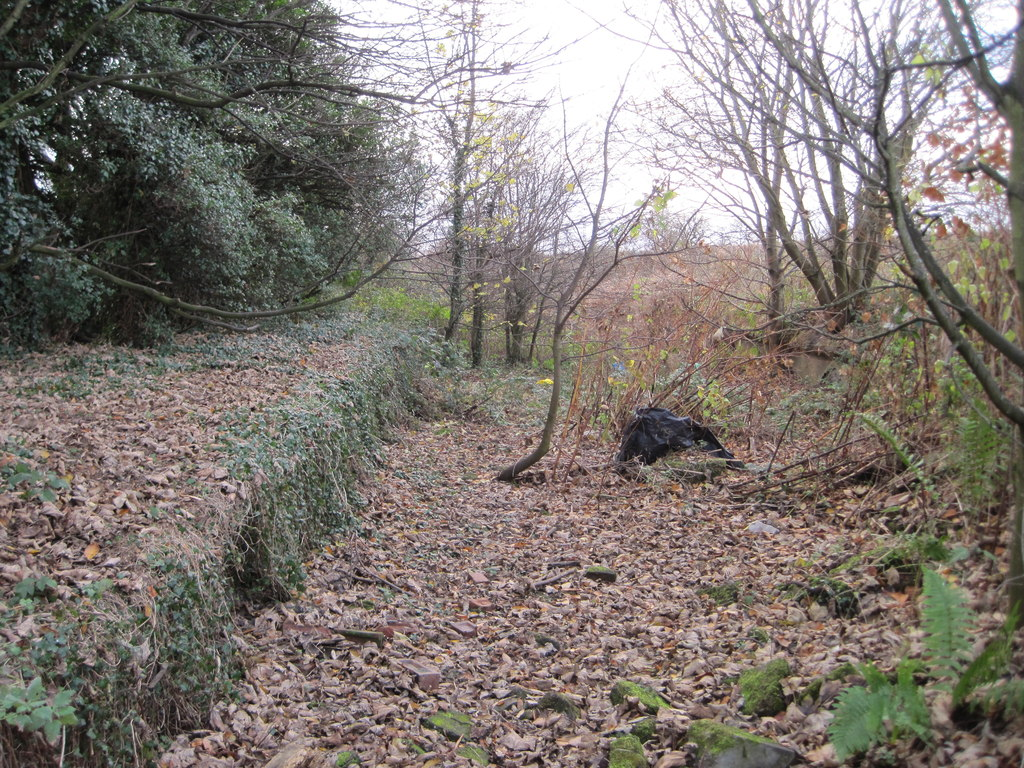
- Woodkirk railway station

General information
- Location: Woodkirk, City of Leeds; England
- Coordinates: 53.722°N 1.591°W
- Grid reference: SE270251
- Line: Batley to Beeston Line
- Platforms: 2
- Tracks: 2

History
- Pre-grouping: Great Northern Railway
- Post-grouping: London and North Eastern Railway

Key dates
- 1 July 1890: Opened to goods traffic
- 1 August 1890: Opened to passenger traffic
- 23 September 1939: Closed
Location

Woodkirk railway station was a Great Northern Railway (GNR) station on the Batley to Beeston line, which connected Batley to Leeds Central, in West Yorkshire, England. The station opened in July 1890 and was closed in September 1939 to passengers, but the line stayed open until 1964. The station was 1 3/4 miles (2.8 km) north of Batley railway station, and 6 3/4 miles (10.9 km) south of Leeds Central railway station.

== History ==
The 4 3/4-mile (7.6 km) line connecting Batley to Tingley and Beeston (commonly called the Batley & Beeston Line), was authorised by an Act of Parliament in 1881. The line served an infill purpose, connecting the Great Northern Railway's Batley station with Beeston railway station on what is now the Leeds arm of the East Coast Main Line. At Tingley railway station, it intersected with the line between Bradford and Wakefield via Morley Top.

Although the southern end from Batley railway station was connected to Soothill Wood Colliery in 1887, the station at Woodkirk and the section on to Tingley and Beeston did not open until 1890. Batty speculates money was an issue due to the heavy engineering on a short 5-mile (8 km) line, having cuttings, tunnels and a viaduct over the ECML at Beeston. On being awarded the Act of Parliament for the line in 1881, the GNR allocated £125,000 (equivalent to £13,001,000 in 2025) to the line's construction. Goods traffic started in July, and passengers trains first started calling at the station from 1 August 1890 onwards. The Railway Clearing House handbook on stations from 1904 shows Woodkirk to have had a crane which could lift 10 tonnes (11 tons), and had six goods sidings in the immediate vicinity (mostly quarries). It also details that the Lancashire & Yorkshire Railway (L&YR) had running powers over the line.

The station closed to passengers in September 1939, however, the line remained open to passenger trains until October 1951. The southern section of 1 3/4 miles (2.8 km) from Batley to Woodkirk closed completely in July 1953, but freight continued on the line northwards, (specifically the quarry traffic around Woodkirk) until June 1964.

== Services ==
Passenger trains consisted of around 15 services a day from Leeds Central initially, with some not returning via Woodkirk. Many trains were circular, going via Batley, Dewsbury, Ossett and Wrenthorpe Junction to return to Leeds (and vice versa). In 1893, the L&YR had a joint service with the GNR which ran from Leeds Central via Pudsey Greenside, the Spen Valley Line, Dewsbury and then Ossett before heading south to Barnsley.

In the 1906 timetable, the station is still listed as being on a circular route from Leeds Central with 14 services per day. This made it some 17 3/4 miles (28.6 km) distant from Leeds when the trains went via Pudsey and Dewsbury, and 6 1/2 miles (10.5 km) when trains went direct via Tingley and Beeston. The circular trains continued until 1938, when they were withdrawn and a straight service between Batley and Leeds was introduced, though this lasted only a year for Woodkirk, which closed in September 1939. After Woodkirk closed to passengers, the line remained open for all trains, the 1944 timetable showing that six trains per day went from Leeds to Wakefield via the line.

Preceding station	Historical railways	Following station
Batley; Line closed, station open	Batley and Beeston line	Tingley; Line and station closed
