= Stanley (West Yorkshire) railway station =

Former railway station in England

Coordinates: 53.717°N 1.467°W

Stanley railway station on the Methley Joint Railway served the village of Stanley east of Outwood, Wakefield, West Yorkshire.

Some early railways already served the local collieries before 1840. When Methley Joint Railway was built a site on Aberford Road was chosen for Stanley station which opened 1 May 1869. By 1906, the station had two platforms and a station building with a remarkably high pitched roof. Sixteen trains per day stopped at Stanley in the 1920s. Main freights were coal and rhubarb, the latter was conveyed as far as London. Originally equipped with a Saxby and Farmer signal box, the station gained a Great Northern Railway Type 1 signal box with a 30 lever frame in 1884. In 1961 Stanley was served by passenger trains running between Leeds Central and Castleford, with some of then continuing to and from Pontefract Baghill or Goole. Diminishing cost-effectiveness of the line led to its closure on 2 November 1964, in the course of the Beeching cuts.

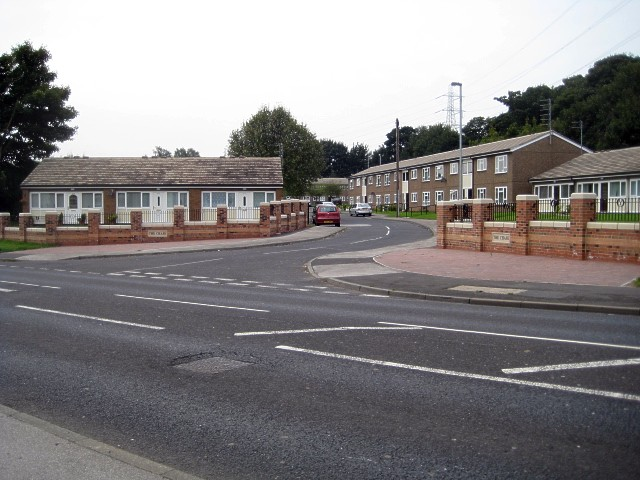
Housing on the grounds of the former station in September 2008

No trace remains of the station. A housing development has been built on its grounds.

Preceding station	Disused railways	Following station
Ardsley	Methley Joint Railway	Methley South
Lofthouse and Outwood	Methley Joint Railway	Methley South
