= Drighlington and Adwalton railway station =

Disused railway station in West Yorkshire, England

Drighlington and Adwalton
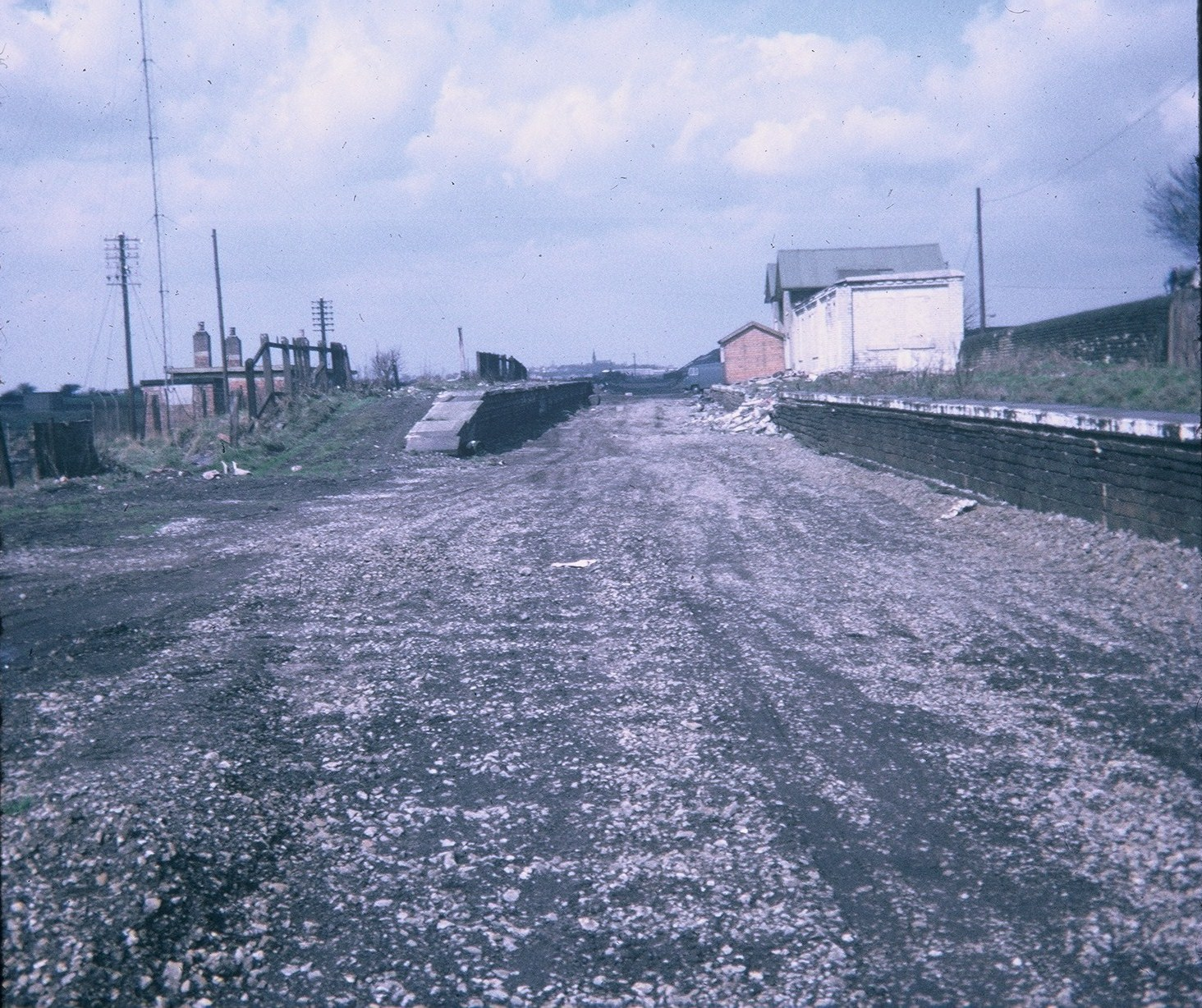
- Site of the station in 1969

General information
- Location: Drighlington, City of Leeds; England
- Coordinates: 53.7481°N 1.6645°W
- Grid reference: SE222280
- Platforms: 2

Other information
- Status: Disused

History
- Original company: Great Northern Railway
- Pre-grouping: Great Northern Railway
- Post-grouping: LNER

Key dates
- 20 August 1856: Opened as Drighlington
- 12 June 1961: Name changed to Drighlington and Adwalton
- 1 January 1962: Closed
Location

Drighlington and Adwalton railway station served the village of Drighlington, West Yorkshire, England from 1856 to 1962 on the Leeds, Bradford and Halifax Junction Railway. The A650 Drighlington Bypass now runs through the site of the station.

== History ==
The station opened as Drighlington on 20 August 1856 by the Great Northern Railway. Its name was changed to Drighlington and Adwalton on 12 June 1961. It closed to both passenger and goods traffic on 1 January 1962.

Preceding station	Disused railways	Following station
Birkenshaw and Tong; Line and station closed	Leeds, Bradford and Halifax Junction Railway	Gildersome West; Line and station closed
