= Manchester Road railway station (West Yorkshire) =

Disused railway station in West Yorkshire, England

Manchester Road

General information
- Location: Bradford, City of Bradford; England
- Coordinates: 53.781650°N 1.758010°W
- Grid reference: SE160317
- Platforms: 2

Other information
- Status: Disused

History
- Original company: Bradford and Thornton Railway
- Pre-grouping: Great Northern Railway

Key dates
- 14 October 1878: Station opened
- 31 December 1915: Station closed for passengers
- 6 May 1963: closed for freight
Location

Manchester Road railway station is a closed station in the city of Bradford, West Yorkshire, England. The station opened in 1878 but closed to passengers in 1915. The goods yard remained open until 1963.

The station was bypassed by a single line after 1963 to serve the City Road Goods Branch. After closure of the line, the site has been overbuilt with a Royal Mail sorting office.

A pub remains nearby, called the Station Hotel.

Preceding station	Disused railways	Following station
City Road Goods	Great Northern Railway	St Dunstans
Horton Park	Great Northern Railway	Laisterdyke
