= Birkenshaw and Tong railway station =

Disused railway station in West Yorkshire, England

Birkenshaw and Tong
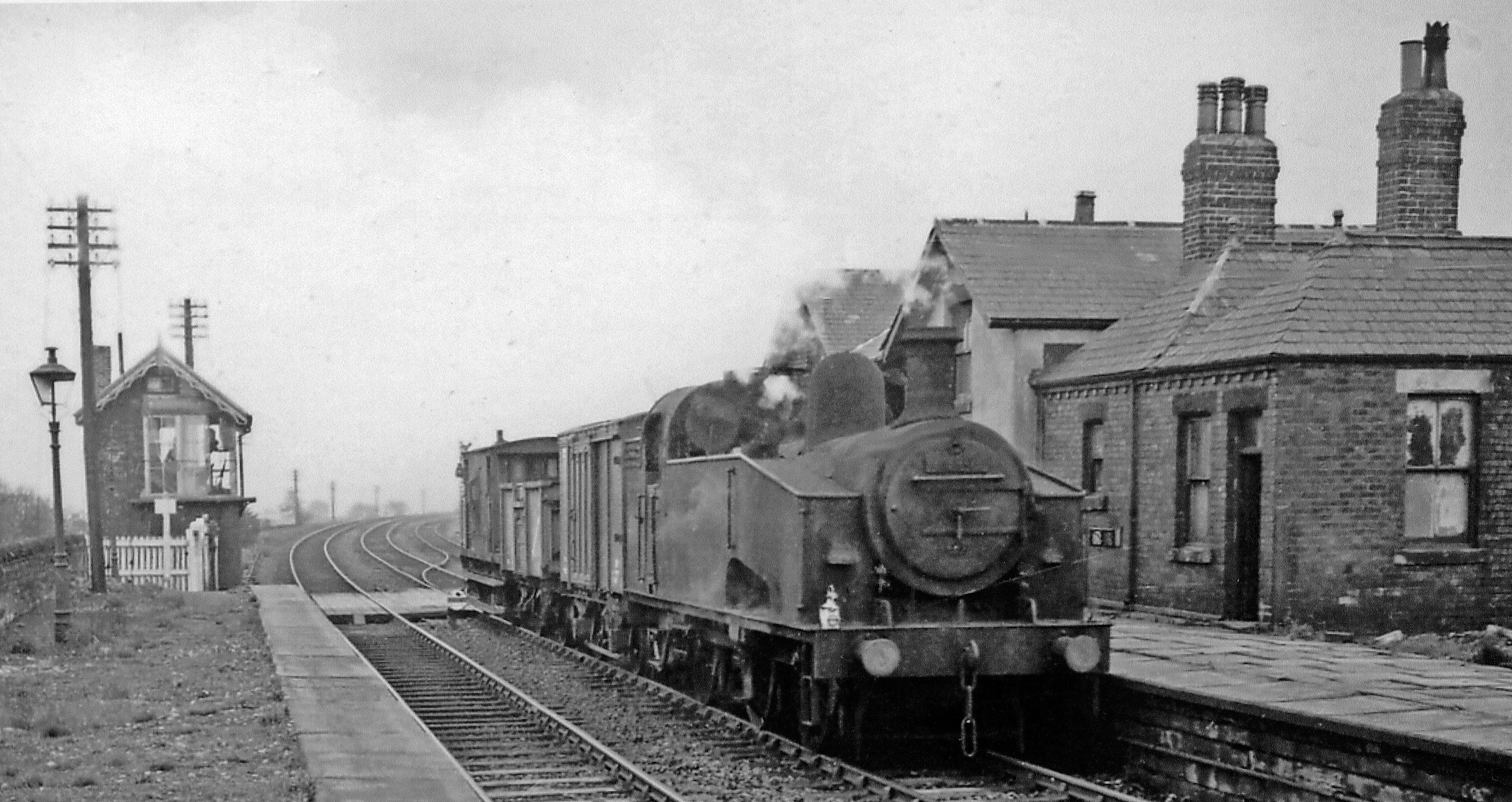
- The station in 1961

General information
- Location: Birkenshaw, Kirklees; England
- Coordinates: 53.7582°N 1.6875°W
- Grid reference: SE207291
- Platforms: 2

Other information
- Status: Disused

History
- Original company: Great Northern Railway
- Pre-grouping: Great Northern Railway
- Post-grouping: LNER

Key dates
- 20 August 1856: Opened
- 5 October 1953: Closed to passengers
- 1964: Closed completely
Location

Birkenshaw and Tong railway station served the village of Birkenshaw, West Yorkshire, England from 1856 to 1964 on the Leeds, Bradford and Halifax Junction Railway.

== History ==
The station opened as Birkenshaw on 20 August 1856 by the Great Northern Railway. It was named Birkenshaw and Tong in late 1856. The station closed to passengers on 5 October 1953 and completely in 1964.

Preceding station	Disused railways	Following station
Dudley Hill; Line and station closed	Leeds, Bradford and Halifax Junction Railway	Drighlington and Adwalton; Line and station closed
