= St Dunstans railway station =

Disused railway station in West Yorkshire, England

St Dunstans
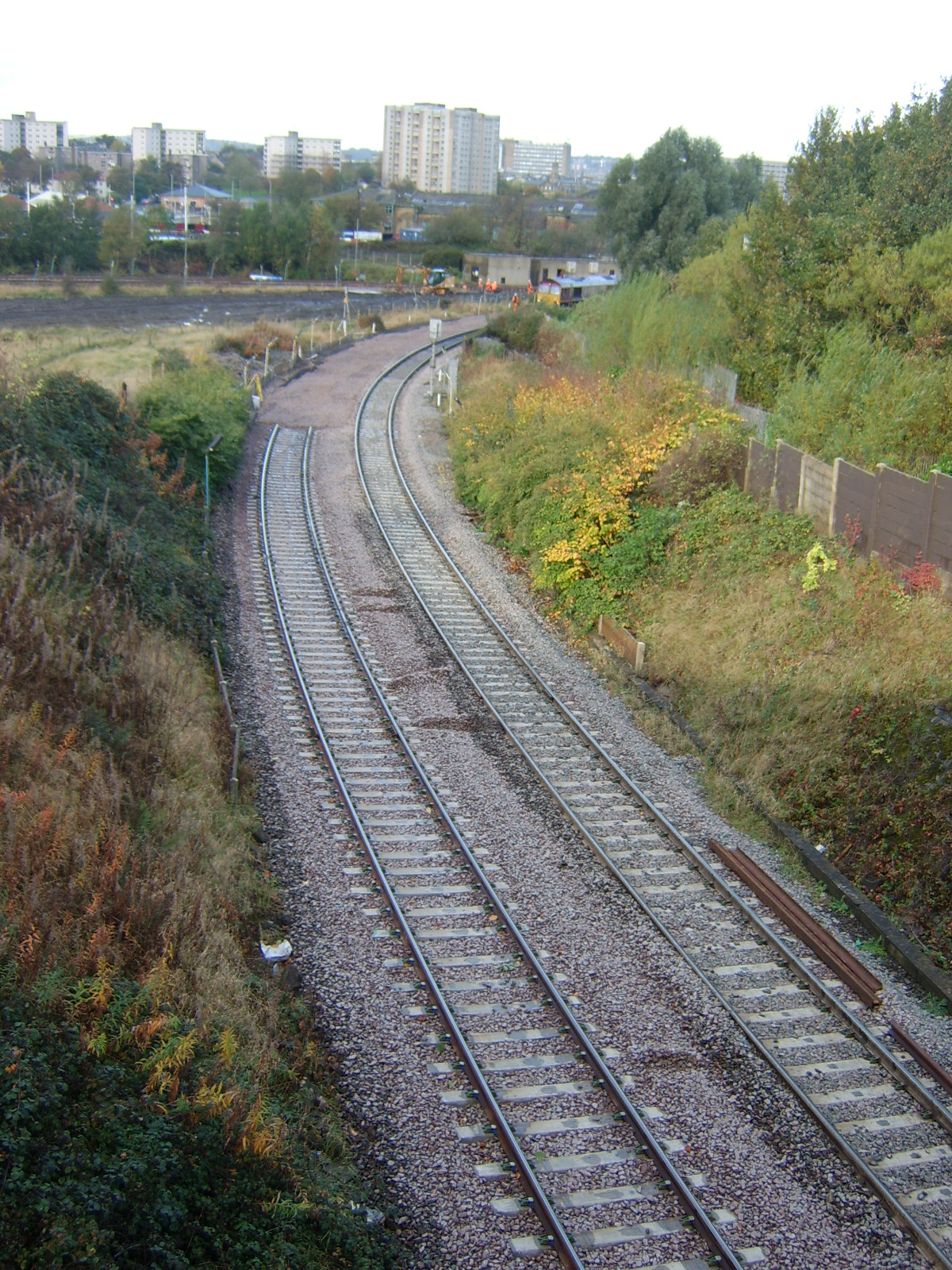
- The location of the Leeds-Bradford platforms at St Dunstans. The Bradford-Queensbury platforms were in the grassy area to the left.

General information
- Location: Bradford, City of Bradford; England
- Coordinates: 53.7840°N 1.7477°W
- Grid reference: SE169321
- Platforms: 4

Other information
- Status: Disused

History
- Original company: Leeds, Bradford and Halifax Junction Railway
- Pre-grouping: Great Northern Railway

Key dates
- 21 November 1878: Station opens
- 15 September 1952: Station closes
Location

St Dunstans railway station is a closed station in the city of Bradford, West Yorkshire, England. The station was the location of a three-way junction with platforms on two of the lines.

== History ==
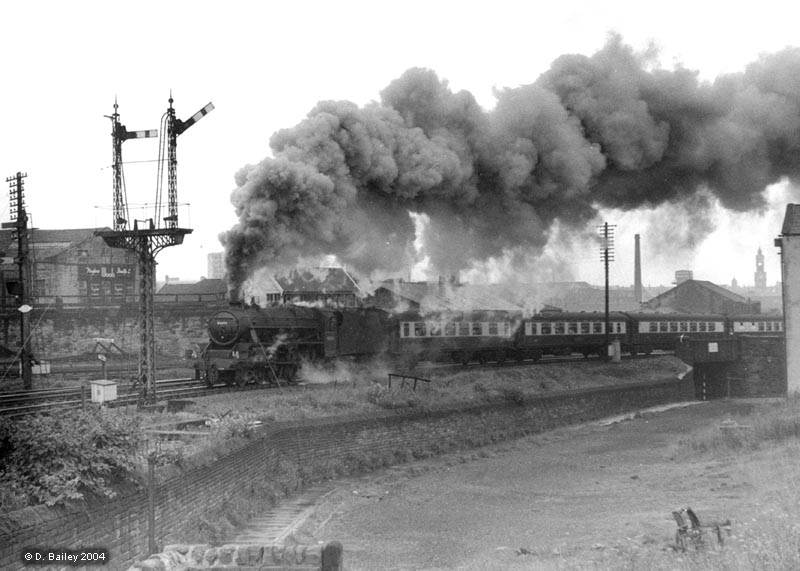
Passenger train passing St Dunstans station around 1960

When the Leeds, Bradford and Halifax Junction Railway (later absorbed by the Great Northern) arrived in Bradford they initially built a terminus at Adolphus Street. This was poorly situated, so a link line was built from east of the terminus looping south and joining the existing Lancashire and Yorkshire line at Mill Lane junction, allowing LB & HJ services to enter the station. When the Queensbury Lines were constructed they entered Bradford from the west and passed under the L&YR line south of Mill Lane junction. They then formed a Y junction with the GN link line, just to the east of Mill Lane junction. St. Dunstans was built in this location as a transfer station so that passengers travelling east / west could change trains without entering Bradford Exchange. The junction had opened in 1876 for goods traffic, two years before the passenger station was opened in November 1878.

A third line, connecting Laisterdyke with the Queensbury Lines, ran along the south of the station, but it was not given platforms. The triangle was used to turn whole trains (steam locomotives and coaches) to enable them to run boiler first from Bradford Exchange railway station. This practice continued until 1972 (when the lines were closed through St Dunstans) if a DMU needed turning, usually because it could not be driven from one end.

With the run down in Queensbury services patronage of the station fell and it closed in 1952. The triangle of lines at St Dunstans were still in operation up until August 1972, when the City Road Goods Branch was closed. The branch veered off the old line to Thornton at Horton Park railway station and usually consisted of coal being forwarded from Laisterdyke goods yard.

== Name ==
The station was located in the Bowling/Ripleyville area of Bradford, but took its name from a local manufacturing works called St. Dunstans. The station nameboards and the associated signal box, were labelled as St Dunstans, though several writers, and the Bradshaws Timetable, have labelled the station as St Dunstan's (with the apostrophe) and some with both.

== Services ==
Even though the route through the Aire Valley was flatter and easier to run trains over as opposed to the Queensbury Lines, the Great Northern offered passengers from Keighley a faster service to London in the 1880s by running a service from Keighley to St Dunstans, which connected with the GN service to London from Bradford Exchange station. In the 1887 timetable, at least one passenger train per day between Laisterdyke and Queensbury used the southern part of the junction that did not have platforms.

The Bradshaws Timetable for 1906 shows St Dunstans having five services for the Shipley and Windhill Line, and 25 through services to Wakefield either direct via Morley, or taking the route via Batley and Dewsbury.

In 1910, 20 services plied the route between Bradford and Queensbury, though not all trains stopped at St Dunstans. In 1947, the LNER timetable shows St Dunstans had 14 departures westwards towards Queensbury, with most travelling to Halifax railway station and the rest going to Keighley.

Preceding station	Disused railways	Following station
Bradford Exchange	Great Northern Railway; Leeds-Bradford Lines	Laisterdyke
Bradford Exchange	Great Northern Railway; Queensbury Lines	Manchester Road
