= Laisterdyke railway station =

Disused railway station in West Yorkshire, England

Laisterdyke
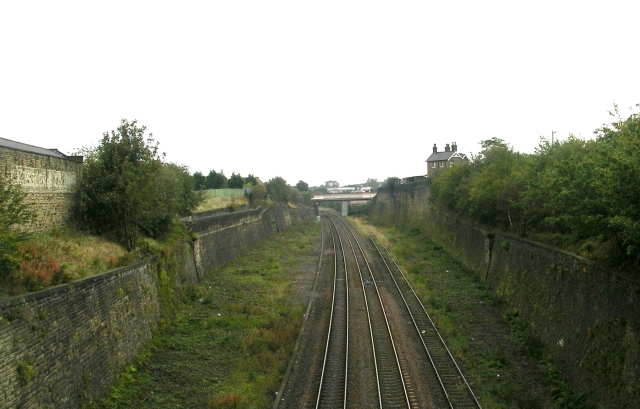
- Former location of Laisterdyke railway station in October 2008, looking east from Laisterdyke overbridge.

General information
- Location: Bradford, City of Bradford; England
- Coordinates: 53.7914°N 1.7165°W
- Grid reference: SE187328
- Platforms: 4

Other information
- Status: Disused

History
- Pre-grouping: Great Northern Railway

Key dates
- 1 August 1854: Station opened
- 4 July 1966: Station closed
Location

Laisterdyke railway station is a closed station in the city of Bradford, West Yorkshire, England, that served the suburb of the same name.

== History ==
The station was opened on 1 August 1854 on the Leeds, Bradford and Halifax Junction Railway's Leeds to Bradford Adolphus Street line. Three years later, a second route from the station to Ardsley via Dudley Hill and Morley (Top) was opened by the same company, making the station a junction of some importance. Further construction by the ambitious Great Northern led to the addition of branches to Wakefield via Adwalton and Batley in 1864, Shipley in 1875 and Pudsey (Greenside) in 1893. The facilities provided here were consequently quite generous, with four platforms, two signal boxes and a sizeable goods yard. The branch to Shipley was an early casualty of road competition, losing its passenger service in February 1931. The other routes survived to be taken into British Railways ownership upon nationalisation in 1948. Both, however, succumbed to the Beeching Axe in the mid-1960s, with services on the Pudsey Loop and to Wakefield via Batley services ending in 1964, and those via Ardsley to Wakefield Westgate following suit two years later.

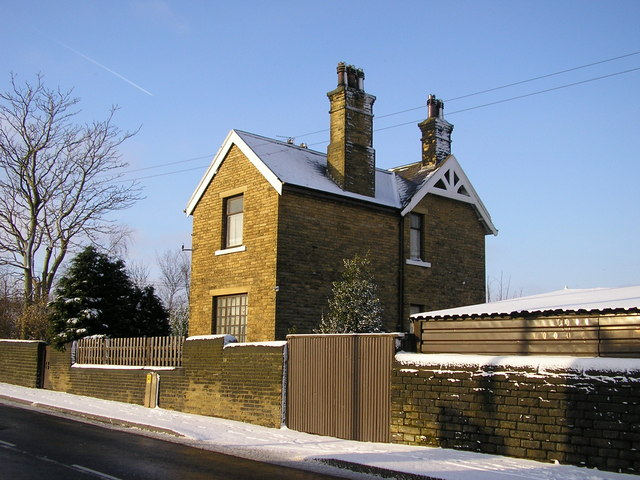
Former station house

The station was closed to passengers on 4 July 1966, on the same day as the line to Ardsley. The platforms were subsequently demolished. Only the station house remains on the top of the cutting south of the tracks, and a siding serves a scrap yard west of the former passenger station.

== Route ==
Preceding station	Disused railways	Following station
Bradford Adolphus Street or St Dunstans or Manchester Road or Bowling	Great Northern Railway	Dudley Hill or Pudsey Greenside
St Dunstans	Great Northern Railway; Shipley Great Northern Railway branch line	Eccleshill
