= Morley Tunnel =

Railway tunnel in West Yorkshire, England

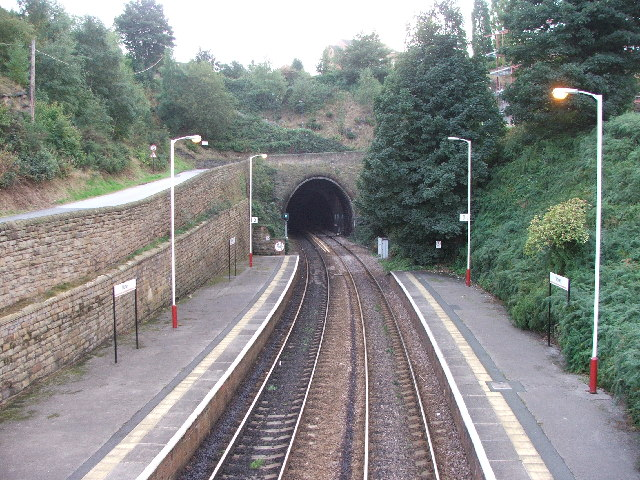
- Northern portal at Morley railway station
- Interactive map of Morley Tunnel

Overview
- Line: Huddersfield line
- Location: West Yorkshire
- Coordinates: 53.7397°N 1.6033°W
- OS grid reference: SE 26261 27108
- System: National Rail
- Start: Morley station
- End: Upper Batley

Operation
- Constructed: 1845–1848
- Owner: Network Rail
- Operator: TransPennine Express; Northern
- Traffic: Train
- Character: Passenger

Technical
- Design engineer: Thomas Granger
- Length: 3,369 yd (3,081 m)
- No. of tracks: Double track
- Track gauge: 4 ft 8 1/2 in (1,435 mm)
- Tunnel clearance: 26 ft (7.9 m)
- Width: 26 ft (7.9 m)
- Morley Tunnel (West Yorkshire)

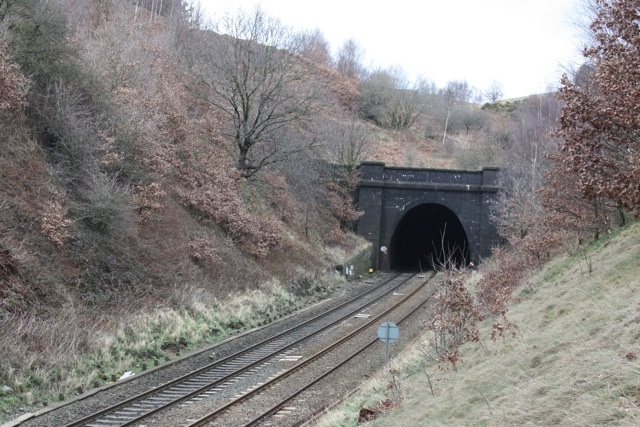
Southern portal

Morley Tunnel is a railway tunnel in West Yorkshire, England, situated between Morley and Batley railway stations on the Huddersfield line. From its northern end (53.7490°N 1.5927°W), it extends 3,369 yards (3,081 m), passing beneath Morley town centre, to its southern end (53.7260°N 1.6192°W).

== History ==
The construction of Morley Tunnel began in 1845. The first stone was laid on 23 February 1846 by John Gott, the chairman of the Leeds, Dewsbury and Manchester Railway. The tunnel was finally completed on 9 May 1848, when the last keystone was placed at the Morley end of the tunnel by Thomas Grainger, the principal engineer. The completion of the tunnel created much excitement around the town, and a band marked this occasion when it played at the event. The resident engineer was Henry Renton. However, by 6 May 1846, the original contractors for the tunnel, Jones, Humphries and Pickering, were dismissed as work had been progressing from both ends of the tunnel that had been undertaken too fast, and the two sections would not have met in the middle due to a height difference.

The completion of the tunnel provided a much needed rail link between Yorkshire and Lancashire. During construction, 18 working shafts were sunk so that work could proceed at a clearance rate of 300 yards (270 m) per month. In addition, there are four permanent vent/construction shafts still in use today at Town End, Hopewell Farm, America Moor and Howley Park. At one time, men worked at 48 different points along the length of the tunnel. This was made possible by using steam engines to lower men down the working shafts to the level of the tunnel and raising stone and clay to the surface.

To construct the tunnel, 11 powerful steam engines, 15 double horse gins, 2,000 men and 330 horses were used, and the work caused a huge change to the then known landscape, particularly in the area where Morley Low station is situated, where a huge cutting had to be excavated and the valley stream had to be culverted. At its deepest point the tunnel is 400 feet below ground level. It is almost level throughout its length except for a slight gradient to allow for drainage. The tunnel is 3,369 yards (3,081 m) long, 26 feet (7.9 m) high and 26 feet wide to accommodate two tracks. Between 1857 and 1961, the other station (Morley Top) was 200 feet (61 m) above the centre point of the tunnel. The construction of the tunnel was undertaken in a shorter time-span than that of Standedge Tunnel, which was being built around the same time, even though Morley Tunnel is longer. However, the challenging conditions at Standedge made that work harder.

Morley Tunnel was built above substantial coal measures that had been licensed to the Earl of Cardigan. Large sums in compensation money had to be paid out to his estate as mining underneath the tunnel would have led to subsidence issues. In 1890, a decision was taken to quadruple the route between Leeds and Huddersfield, but Morley Tunnel proved to be too much of an engineering issue to overcome, so the Leeds New Line was promoted instead to provide extra traffic. However, coal mining did create a myriad of problems as the tunnel was built over the workings of two local collieries; Morley Main and Howley Park. The whole tunnel was rebuilt during the 1920s, with single line working implemented. The portal at the southern end (nearest Batley), was taken down completely and rebuilt using Staffordshire Blue Brick, with this work not being completed until 1933.

The rock and clay brought to the surface from the tunnelling project was used as building material, producing bricks from the excavated clay. Much of the sandstone not suitable for this was used in road building.

== Today ==
Today, the tunnel is used by the local services run by Northern and the long distance services between Leeds and Manchester Piccadilly by TransPennine Express as part of the London North Eastern (LNE) route (Network Rail designation), between Leeds and Huddersfield.
