= Beeston railway station (West Yorkshire) =

Disused railway station in West Yorkshire, England

Beeston (West Yorkshire)
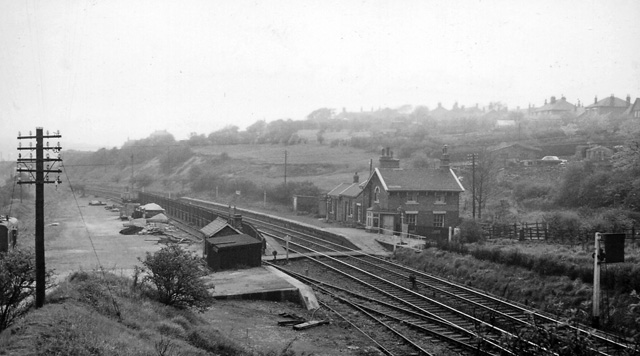
- Beeston railway station (West Yorkshire); looking north west

General information
- Location: Beeston, City of Leeds; England
- Coordinates: 53.769152°N 1.572804°W
- Grid reference: SE282304
- Platforms: 2

Other information
- Status: Disused

History
- Original company: Bradford, Wakefield and Leeds Railway
- Pre-grouping: Great Northern Railway
- Post-grouping: London and North Eastern Railway

Key dates
- February 1860: Station opens
- 2 March 1953: Closed to passengers
- 2 November 1964: Closed for freight
Location

Beeston railway station (West Yorkshire) was a railway station situated on the Great Northern Railway on the southern outskirts of Leeds, England.

== History ==
Beeston railway station was 2 1/2 miles (4 km) south of Leeds Central and was opened by the Bradford, Wakefield and Leeds Railway in 1860. The line opened to traffic in 1857 and Beeston was opened 3 years later. The heavily engineered branch to Batley was built south of Beeston in 1890 (it crossed the Wakefield line twice and had a flying junction for Leeds bound traffic) and provided Tingley with a four way junction.

The station was built in the middle of a very elongated four way junction with trains able to go north to Leeds Central via Holbeck or Bradford Exchange via Bramley. Southwards directions were to Tingley as described above and to Ardsley then Wakefield Westgate.

The station was served by the Leeds Circular service that left Leeds Central calling at Holbeck, Beeston, Ardsley, Lofthouse & Outwood, Alverthorpe, Flushdyke, Ossett, Earlsheaton, Dewsbury, Batley Carr, Batley, Woodkirk, Tingley, Beeston, Holbeck and back to Leeds Central. These services amounted to seven trains daily in each direction and lasted between 1890 and 1938.

The station closed on 2 March 1953, some four months before the Tingley line succumbed to closure.

The route is still open as part of the Leeds arm of the East Coast Main Line, Cross Country line and local services on the Wakefield Line.

Preceding station	Disused railways	Following station
Armley Moor or Holbeck (High level)	Great Northern Railway; Bradford, Wakefield and Leeds Railway	Ardsley or Tingley
