= City Road (disambiguation) =

City Road is a street in Islington, London.

City Road may also refer to:

== Roads ==
- City Road, Cardiff, Wales
- City Road, Sydney, a road located in Sydney, New South Wales, Australia

== Other transport ==
- City Road Basin, part of the Regent's Canal in London, England
- City Road Goods Branch a goods only branch serving the Lister Hills area of Bradford, West Yorkshire, England
- City Road Lock a lock on the Regent's Canal, in the London Borough of Islington, England
- City Road tube station a former London Underground station

== Places ==
- City Road Baptist Church, a Baptist church on Upper York Street, Bristol, England
- City Road Cemetery, a cemetery in the City of Sheffield, England
- City Road Chapel a Methodist church on City Road, London

== See also ==
- Road City
