= Tingley railway station =

Disused railway station in Tingley, West Yorkshire

Tingley
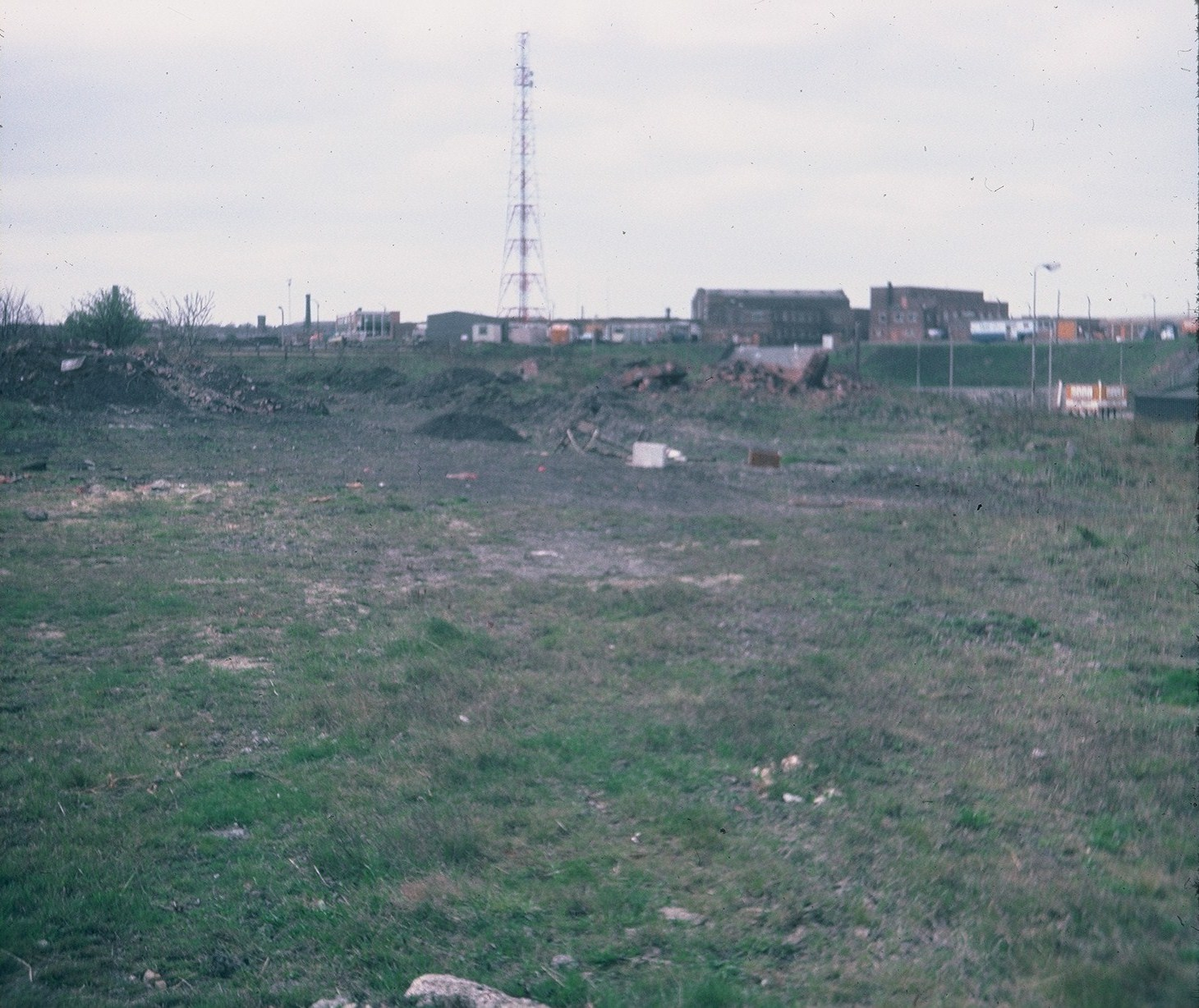
- Remains of the station (1976)

General information
- Location: Tingley, City of Leeds; England
- Coordinates: 53.735°N 1.574°W
- Grid reference: SE282266
- Platforms: 2

Other information
- Status: Disused

History
- Original company: Leeds, Bradford and Halifax Junction Railway
- Pre-grouping: Great Northern Railway
- Post-grouping: LNER; British Railways (North Eastern Region)

Key dates
- May 1857: Opened
- 1 February 1954: Closed to passengers
- July 1966: Closed permanently
Location

Tingley railway station served the settlement of Tingley, West Yorkshire, England, from 1857 to 1966 on the Leeds, Bradford and Halifax Junction Railway.

== History ==
The station opened in May 1857 by the Leeds, Bradford and Halifax Junction Railway. It closed on 1 February 1954 to regular passenger traffic but it was still open for excursions. This lasted until July 1966 and the station closed to goods traffic later on in the 1960s.

Preceding station	Historical railways	Following station
Morley Top; Line and station closed	Leeds, Bradford and Halifax Junction Railway	Ardsley; Line and station closed
Woodkirk; Line and station closed	Batley and Beeston line	Beeston; Line open, station closed
