= Bradford railway station =

Bradford railway station may refer to:

== In Bradford, Ontario ==
- Bradford GO Station

== In Bradford, England ==
- Bradford Adolphus Street railway station, demolished in the 1970s
- Bradford Forster Square railway station, served by Northern and London North Eastern Railway, formerly Bradford Market Street station
- Bradford Interchange, served by Northern and Grand Central
- Bradford Exchange railway station, former station replaced by Bradford Interchange
