= Dudley Hill railway station =

Disused railway station in West Yorkshire, England

Dudley Hill

General information
- Location: Dudley Hill, City of Bradford; England
- Coordinates: 53.7745°N 1.7208°W
- Grid reference: SE184308

Other information
- Status: Disused

History
- Original company: Leeds, Bradford and Halifax Junction Railway
- Pre-grouping: GNR
- Post-grouping: L&NER

Key dates
- 20 August 1856: Opened (passenger)
- 1 January 1857: Opened (goods)
- 7 April 1952: Closed (passenger)
- 1981: Closed (line)
Location

Dudley Hill railway station was a railway station that served Dudley Hill, West Yorkshire, England.

== History ==
The line was open to passengers on 20 August 1856 and to goods traffic on 1 January 1857. The station closed in 1952 but passenger services on the line continued until 4 July 1966 and goods traffic continued until 1981. The station was demolished after closure and a supermarket car park now occupies the site leaving no trace of the station or the railway.

Preceding station	Disused railways	Following station
Laisterdyke	Great Northern Railway	Low Moor or Birkenshaw and Tong
