= Bowling Junction railway station =

Disused railway station in West Yorkshire, England

Bowling Junction
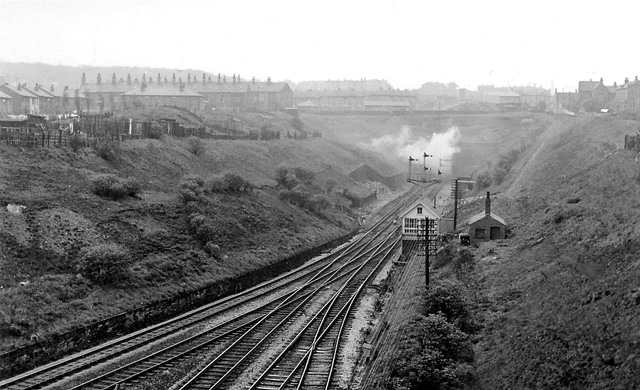
- Location of the former station in 1961

General information
- Location: Bradford, City of Bradford; England
- Coordinates: 53.775342°N 1.748460°W
- Grid reference: SE166310

Other information
- Status: Disused

History
- Original company: Lancashire and Yorkshire Railway
- Pre-grouping: Lancashire and Yorkshire Railway
- Post-grouping: London, Midland and Scottish Railway

Key dates
- 1 February 1902: Opened
- 3 December 1951: closed
Location

Bowling Junction railway station is a closed station in the city of Bradford, West Yorkshire, England. It was situated on the Calder Valley line to the south of Bradford Exchange.

Preceding station	Disused railways	Following station
Low Moor	L&Y; Calder Valley line	Bradford Exchange or Bowling
