= Bowling railway station (England) =

Disused railway station in West Yorkshire, England

Bowling
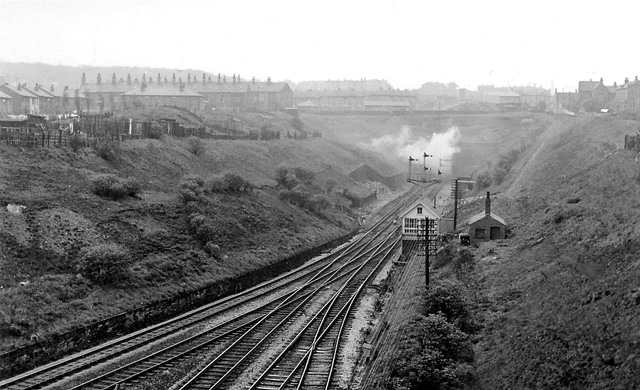
- Remains of Bowling Junction Station

General information
- Location: Bradford, City of Bradford; England
- Coordinates: 53.786500°N 1.737314°W
- Grid reference: SE174322

Other information
- Status: Disused

History
- Original company: Leeds, Bradford and Halifax Junction Railway
- Pre-grouping: Great Northern Railway

Key dates
- 1 August 1854: opened
- 1 February 1895: closed
Location

Bowling railway station is a closed station in the city of Bradford, West Yorkshire, England. It was on the line connecting the Bradford Exchange – Low Moor line of the Lancashire and Yorkshire Railway with the line of the Great Northern Railway (GNR) at Laisterdyke. It was opened by the GNR on 1 August 1854 and closed to passengers on 1 February 1895. The line remained open to freight until 4 May 1964. No trace remains of the station which was located northeast of the bridge crossing Wakefield Road.

Preceding station	Disused railways	Following station
Bowling Junction	Great Northern Railway	Laisterdyke

== Literature ==
- Bairstow, Martin (1987). The Manchester and Leeds Railway: The Calder Valley Line. Halifax: Martin Bairstow. p. 28. ISBN 1-871944-22-8.
