= Ardsley railway station =

Disused railway station in West Yorkshire, England

Ardsley
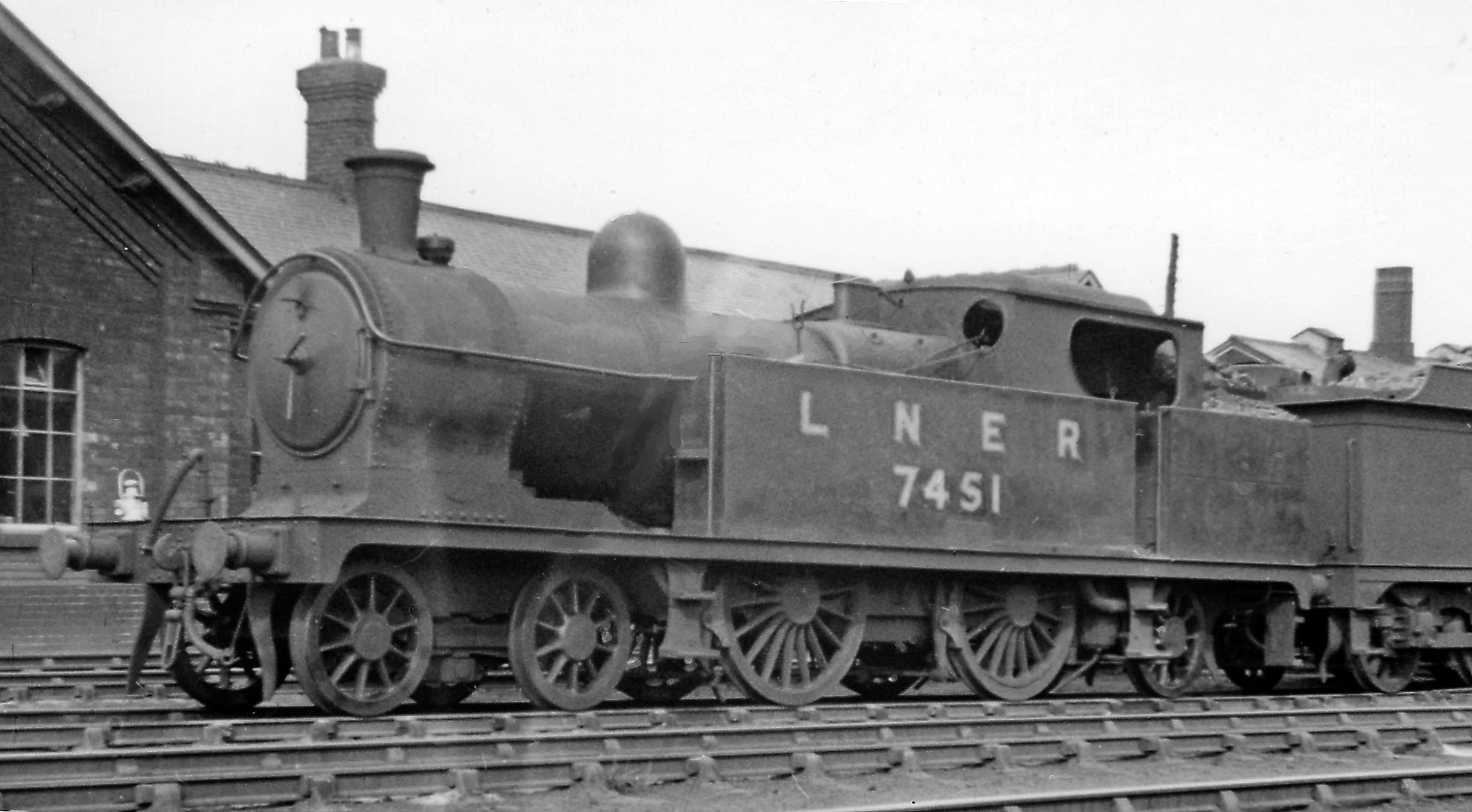
- LNER C14 7450 at Ardsley locomotive depot in 1947

General information
- Location: East Ardsley, City of Leeds; England
- Coordinates: 53.732600°N 1.537800°W
- Grid reference: SE305263
- Platforms: 2

Other information
- Status: Disused

History
- Original company: Bradford, Wakefield and Leeds Railway
- Pre-grouping: Great Northern Railway
- Post-grouping: London and North Eastern Railway

Key dates
- 5 October 1857: Station opens
- 2 November 1964: Station closes
Location

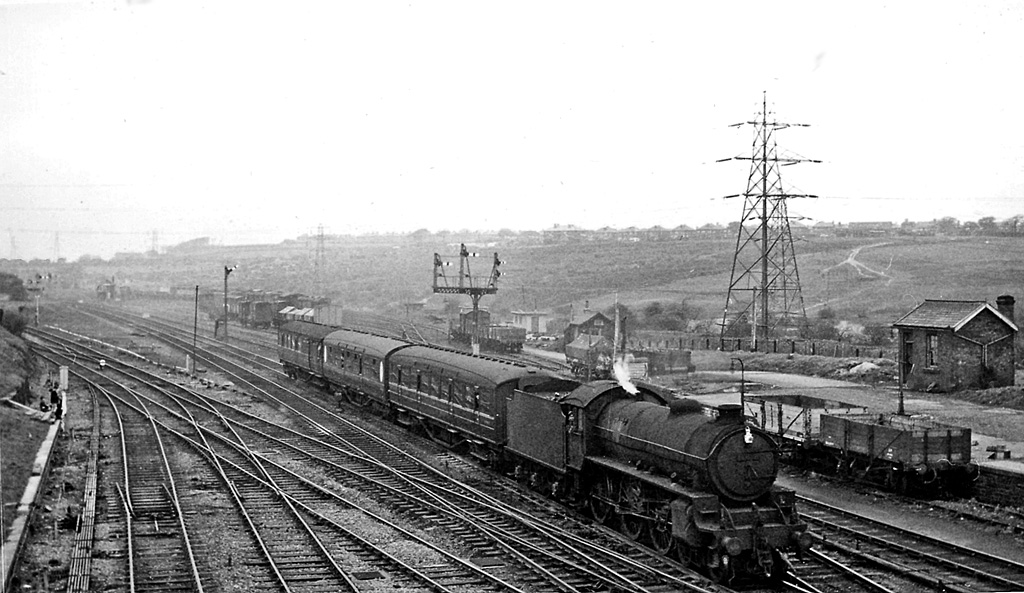
Approaching the station in 1961

Ardsley railway station was situated on the Great Northern Railway between Tingley and Lofthouse and Outwood on the main line and west of Stanley on the LNER & LMS Methley Joint Railway. It was built to serve the village of East Ardsley near Wakefield in the English county of West Yorkshire.

== History ==
The station was opened by the Bradford, Wakefield and Leeds Railway on 5 October 1857 as part of their Wakefield to Leeds main line. Five days later, it became a junction with the completion of a branch line to Bradford via Morley by the Leeds, Bradford and Halifax Junction Railway. Both lines soon became part of the rapidly expanding Great Northern Railway network in the area and by 1866 the opening of the jointly owned West Riding and Grimsby Railway from Wakefield to Doncaster put the station on the main line between Leeds and London King's Cross. The GNR subsequently became part of the London and North Eastern Railway during the Grouping of 1923. The line then passed on to the Eastern Region of British Railways on nationalisation in 1948. The station was eventually closed by the British Railways Board on 2 November 1964 as part of the Beeching cutbacks, with the line to Bradford following suit on 4 July 1966.

To the south of the station, to the east of the main line was situated the engine shed which provided the passenger locomotives for the Wakefield services and freight locomotives for the colliery traffic generated in the area.

== Station site today ==
Trains still pass the site of the station between Leeds and Wakefield Westgate stations on the Wakefield Line, although little remains of the actual station.

Land adjacent to the site of Ardsley station is now developed for 88 residential houses and apartments by Miller Homes.

Preceding station	Disused railways	Following station
Tingley or Beeston	London and North Eastern Railway; Great Northern Railway	Lofthouse and Outwood
Tingley or Beeston	London and North Eastern Railway; Methley Joint Railway	Stanley
