= City Road Goods Branch =

Disused railway station in West Yorkshire, England

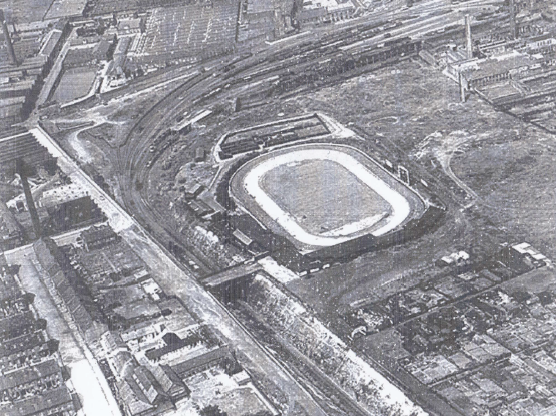
- Aerial view of the City Road goods branch curving around the old City Stadium, c. 1950

General information
- Location: Bradford, City of Bradford; England
- Coordinates: 53.79851°N 1.77903°W
- Grid reference: SE146336

Other information
- Status: Disused

History
- Pre-grouping: Great Northern Railway
Location

The City Road Goods branch was a goods only branch serving the Lister Hills and Thornton Road areas of Bradford, West Yorkshire, England.

== History ==
Proposed as part of the Bradford and Thornton Railways Act (1865), later withdrawn but then incorporated in the Bradford and Thornton Railways Act 1871 (34 & 35 Vict. c. clxix), and later amalgamated with the Great Northern Railway (18 July 1872). The line to City Road from St Dunstans opened on 4 December 1876 and consisted of a double-track branch from just east of Horton Park at Horton Junction travelling north for 1 mile 1,140 yards (2.652 km) at a climbing gradient (northwards) of 1-in-50, then 1-in-88. City Road was one of four major goods depots in Bradford: Aldolphus Street built by the Great Northern Railway, Bridge Street built by the Lancashire & Yorkshire Railway, and Valley Road, built by the Midland Railway. City Road Goods Yard was only 1 mile (1.6 km) west of Bradford city centre.

During the 1950s, the boilers from two Great Northern Railway Atlantics were used to provide steam for two compound hydraulic pumping engines.

Although the branch was intended solely for goods traffic, at least one passenger train reached the terminus, the West Riding Railtour on 6 September 1964, believed to be the only time a passenger train ran up and down the line. By the late 1960s, all freight traffic except inward workings of coal had ceased, and the site only handled coal from June 1967 until closure.

It closed when goods services were withdrawn from the stub of the St Dunstans to Thornton line on 26 August 1972, and the branch was officially closed on 28 August 1972.

The warehouses were converted into offices of a haulage company. However, they were destroyed in a fire in November 1983. The site later became the location of a Grattan warehouse, the largest single-storey warehouse in Europe at that time.

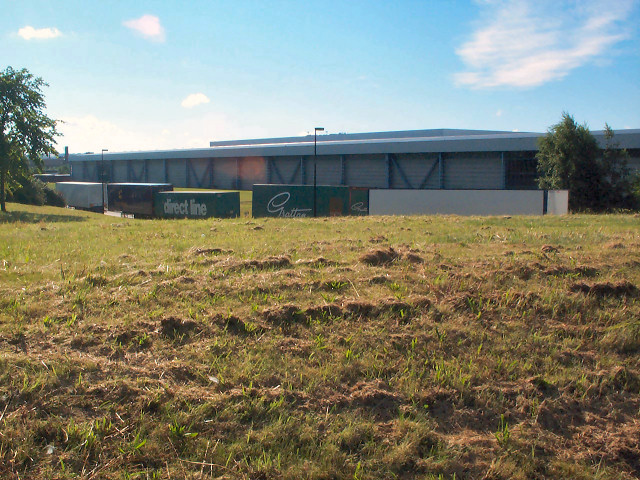
Grattan Warehouse on the location of the former City Road station
