= Morley Top railway station =

Disused railway station in Morley, West Yorkshire

Morley Top
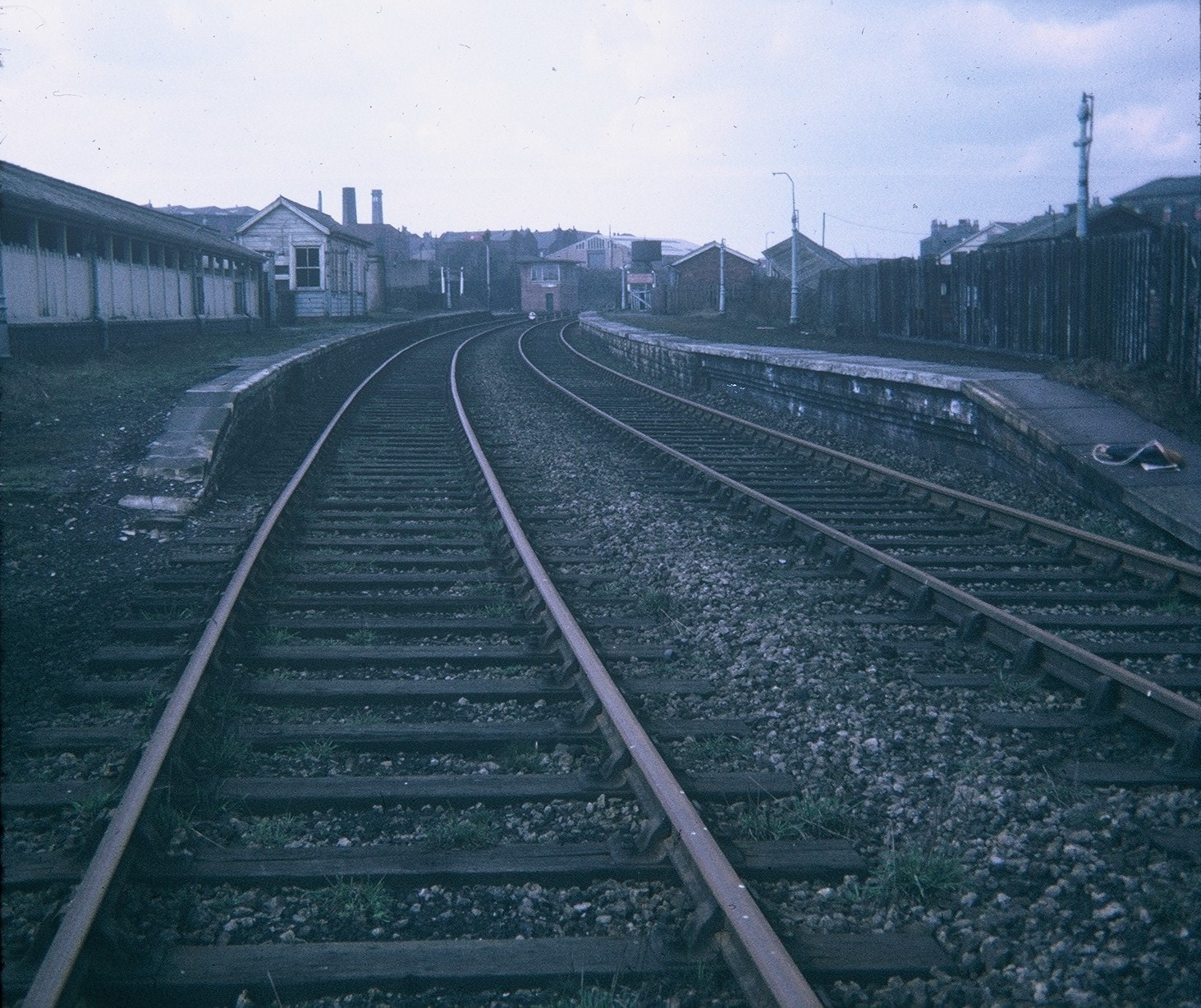
- The station just before goods closure in April 1969

General information
- Location: Morley, City of Leeds; England
- Coordinates: 53.7409°N 1.6011°W
- Grid reference: SE264272

Other information
- Status: Disused

History
- Original company: Leeds, Bradford and Halifax Junction Railway
- Pre-grouping: Great Northern Railway
- Post-grouping: LNER; British Railways (North Eastern Region)

Key dates
- 10 October 1857: Opened as Morley
- 2 March 1951: Name changed to Morley Top
- 2 January 1961: Closed to passengers
- May 1969: Closed to goods
Location

Morley Top railway station served the town of Morley, West Yorkshire, England, from 1857 to 1969 on the Leeds, Bradford and Halifax Junction Railway.

== History ==
The station opened as Morley on 10 October 1857 by the Leeds, Bradford and Halifax Junction Railway. Its name was changed to Morley Top on 2 March 1951 to avoid confusion with another station of the same name. The station closed to passengers on 2 January 1961 and closed to goods in May 1969. The station master's house still survives.

Preceding station	Historical railways	Following station
Gildersome West; Line and station closed	Leeds, Bradford and Halifax Junction Railway	Tingley; Line and station closed
