= Horton Park railway station =

Disused railway station in West Yorkshire, England

Horton Park

General information
- Location: Great Horton, City of Bradford; England
- Coordinates: 53.78464°N 1.77056°W
- Grid reference: SE152320
- Platforms: 2

Other information
- Status: Disused

History
- Original company: Bradford and Thornton Railway
- Pre-grouping: Great Northern Railway
- Post-grouping: London and North Eastern Railway

Key dates
- 23 October 1880: Station opened
- 15 September 1952: Station closed for regular passenger services
- August 1972: closed completely
Location

Horton Park railway station was a railway station on the Queensbury-Bradford section of the Queensbury Lines which ran between Bradford, Keighley and Halifax via Queensbury.

The station was built near to the Bradford Park Avenue football ground. It opened for passengers in 1880 closed for regular passenger trains in 1952 but remained open to special trains on match days until 1955. The station had a large goods yard which kept it open like the City Road Goods Branch until August 1972 when the yards and branch closed and the tracks were lifted. The station remained in place along with its concrete sign until 2005 when the station was demolished to make way for a carpark for the new Al-Jamia Suffa-Tul-Islam Grand Mosque.

Preceding station	Disused railways	Following station
Great Horton	Great Northern Railway; Queensbury lines	Manchester Road
