= Bradford Adolphus Street railway station =

Disused railway station in West Yorkshire, England

Bradford Adolphus Street
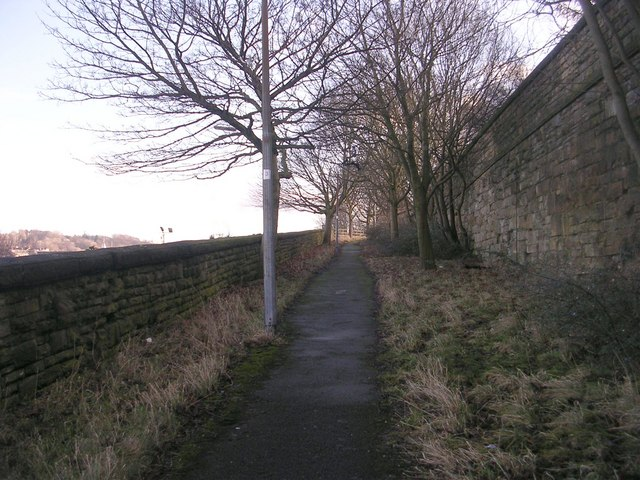
- Footpath on the old access ramp (2011). Station wall to the right

General information
- Location: Bradford, City of Bradford; England
- Coordinates: 53.78855°N 1.74497°W
- Grid reference: SE168325

Other information
- Status: Disused, demolished

History
- Original company: Leeds, Bradford and Halifax Junction Railway
- Pre-grouping: Great Northern

Key dates
- 1 August 1854: opened
- 7 January 1867: closed to passengers
- 1 May 1972: closed for freight
Location

Bradford Adolphus Street railway station is a closed station in the city of Bradford, West Yorkshire, England.

== History ==
When the Leeds, Bradford and Halifax Junction Railway (later absorbed by the Great Northern) arrived in Bradford they initially built a terminus at Adolphus Street. It was poorly situated, and so a branch line was built from east of the terminus that looped south and joined the existing Lancashire and Yorkshire line at Mill Lane junction. That allowed LB & HJ services to enter Bradford Exchange station.

The station was closed to passengers in 1867 but remained in use for parcels and freight traffic until 1972. The station was later demolished. Only an access ramp and parts of the side wall along Dryden Street remain, as well as parts of the coal depot.

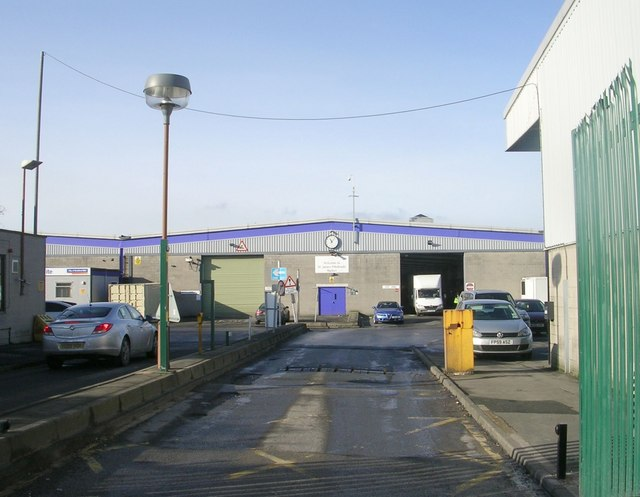
St James's Market on the site of the former station (2011)

Bradford St James's Market now occupies the greater part of the station site while the new alignment of Wakefield Road runs across the site of the former train shed.

Preceding station	Disused railways	Following station
Terminus	Great Northern; Leeds-Bradford lines	Laisterdyke
