= Lofthouse and Outwood railway station =

Disused railway station in West Yorkshire, England

Lofthouse and Outwood
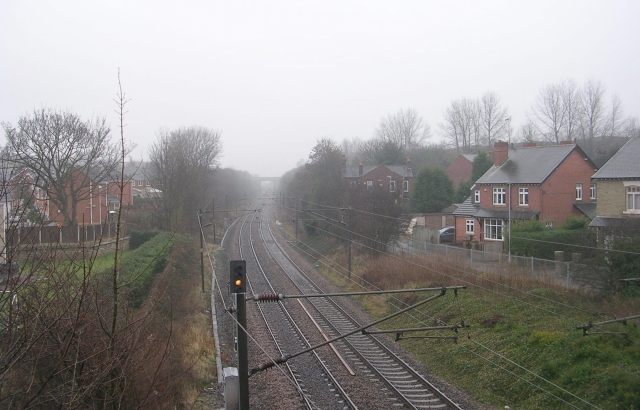
- Looking south from Lingwell Gate Lane bridge towards the site of the former station (2009)

General information
- Location: Outwood, City of Wakefield; England
- Coordinates: 53.713985°N 1.511140°W
- Grid reference: SE323242
- Platforms: 2

Other information
- Status: Disused

History
- Pre-grouping: Methley Joint Railway

Key dates
- 1 May 1869 or 1 May 1876: Opened as Lofthouse Joint
- February 1881: Name changed to Lofthouse
- July 1888: Name changed to Lofthouse and Outwood
- 17 June 1957: Closed
Location

Lofthouse and Outwood railway station served the Outwood area of Wakefield, West Yorkshire, England. It was opened by the Methley Joint Railway in 1869, 1876 and closed in 1957. Here the line from Lofthouse Junction on the line between Cutsyke and Methley of the Lancashire and Yorkshire Railway joined the GNR line between Leeds and Wakefield in a triangular junction, of which the station formed the southern corner. It was situated south of Outwood railway station which was opened in 1988 and south of the bridge of Lingwell Gate Lane.
