= Leeds, Bradford and Halifax Junction Railway =

Railway line in Yorkshire, England

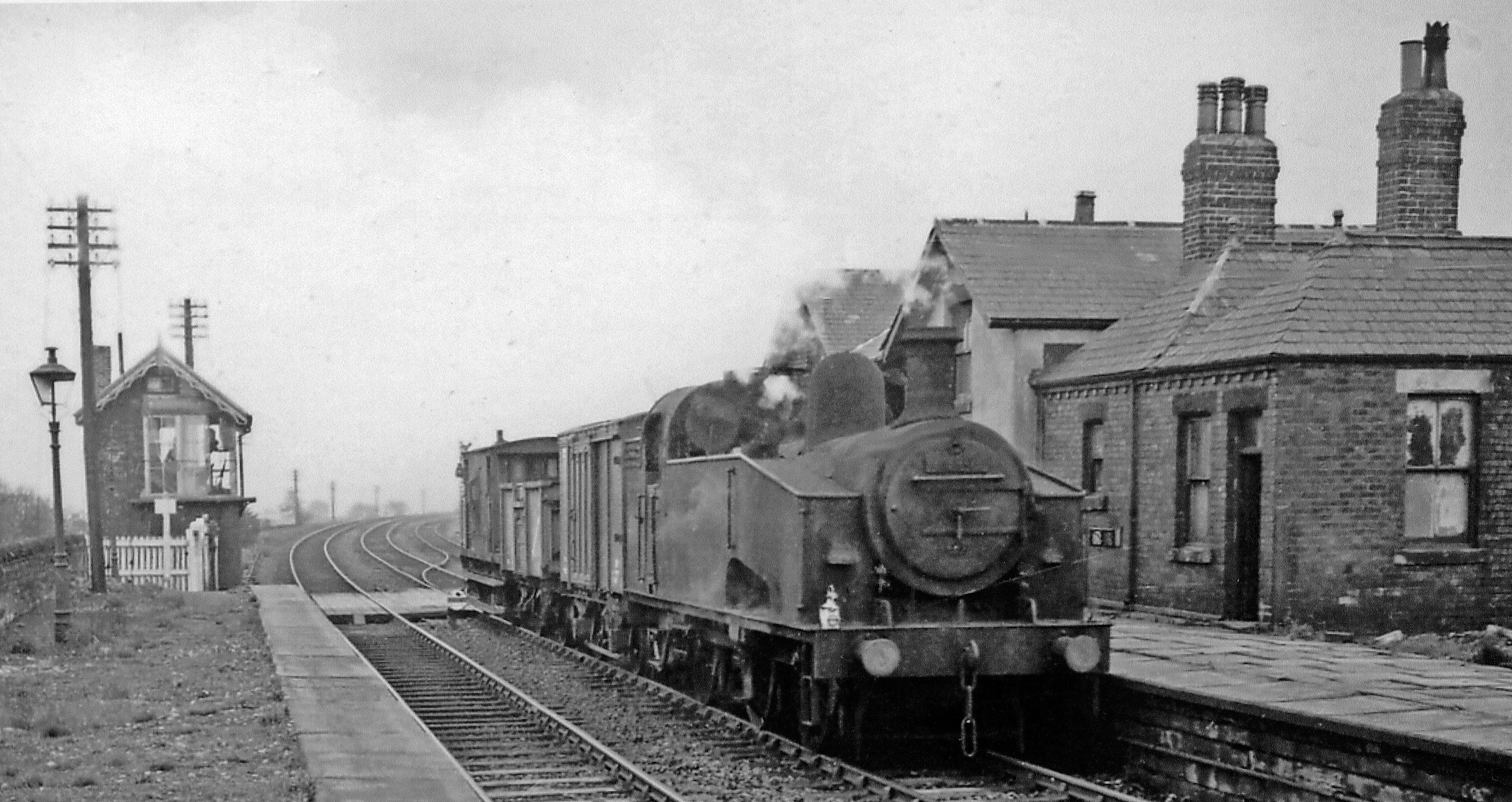
- Birkenshaw & Tong Station

Overview
- Other names: Bradford to Leeds line LB&HJR; Laisterdyke to Ardsley line Gildersome Branch
- Status: Part closed
- Owner: Leeds, Bradford & Halifax Junction Railway; Great Northern Railway; London North Eastern Railway; British Rail (Eastern Region)
- Locale: West Yorkshire
- Stations: Bradford (Adolphus Street/Exchange); Leeds Central; Wakefield Westgate

Service
- Type: Heavy rail
- Operator(s): Great Northern Railway; London North Eastern Railway; British Rail
- Depot(s): Hammerton Street, Bradford

History
- Opened: 1 August 1854
- Completed: 10 October 1857
- Bowling Junction/Adolphus Street to Holbeck Junction: Opened 1 August 1854
- Laisterdyke to Gildersome: Opened 20 August 1866
- Gildersome to Ardsley: Opened 10 October 1857

Technical
- Line length: 21 mi (34 km)
- Number of tracks: 2
- Track gauge: 4 ft 8 1/2 in (1,435 mm) standard gauge

The Leeds, Bradford and Halifax Junction Railway (LB&HJR) was an English railway company. It built a line between Bradford and Leeds, and had running powers over the Lancashire and Yorkshire Railway to Halifax. It opened its main line in 1854 and later built a number of branch lines.

It was worked by the Great Northern Railway, giving that company the access it needed to Bradford and Halifax, and the GNR absorbed the LB&HJR in 1865.

The line between Leeds and Bradford continues in use at the present day, but the rest of the LB&HJR network has closed.

== Predecessors ==
In 1840 a through railway connection between Leeds and London was established, over three railways controlled by George Hudson. Hudson was known as the Railway King; he controlled many companies and used underhand methods against his rivals. Later, he was found out and disgraced. The companies around Leeds were the North Midland Railway (from Derby) and the York and North Midland Railway from Normanton on that line to York.

In 1846 the Great Northern Railway was authorised; it was a stupendously large project to connect London and York. Its promoters had wanted to have a branch to Leeds, but this was rejected by Parliament. As the Great Northern Railway was building its main line, it gave thought to the means by which it might still reach Leeds. Permission to run over other, established railway companies provided the necessary link, and running powers were agreed: GNR trains started running to Leeds on 1 October 1849. The running powers were over the Lancashire and Yorkshire Railway from Askern Junction (a few miles north of Doncaster) to Knottingley and Methley, then over the rival Midland Railway to Gelderd Road Junction, (Note: Some sources, including Wrottesley as well as certain Railway Clearing House maps, spell the junction Geldard Road. The highway at the locality is spelt Gelderd Road.) just outside Leeds. GNR trains from London reversed there and ran over a short length of the Leeds and Thirsk Railway to reach the Central station at Leeds.

This was not a comfortable arrangement: the Midland Railway was hostile, and the agreement had been signed by George Hudson, who then did what he could to frustrate the through running. The Leeds Central station was reached by an awkward reversal of the trains, and was shared with three other railway companies.

== Authorisation of the LB&HJR ==
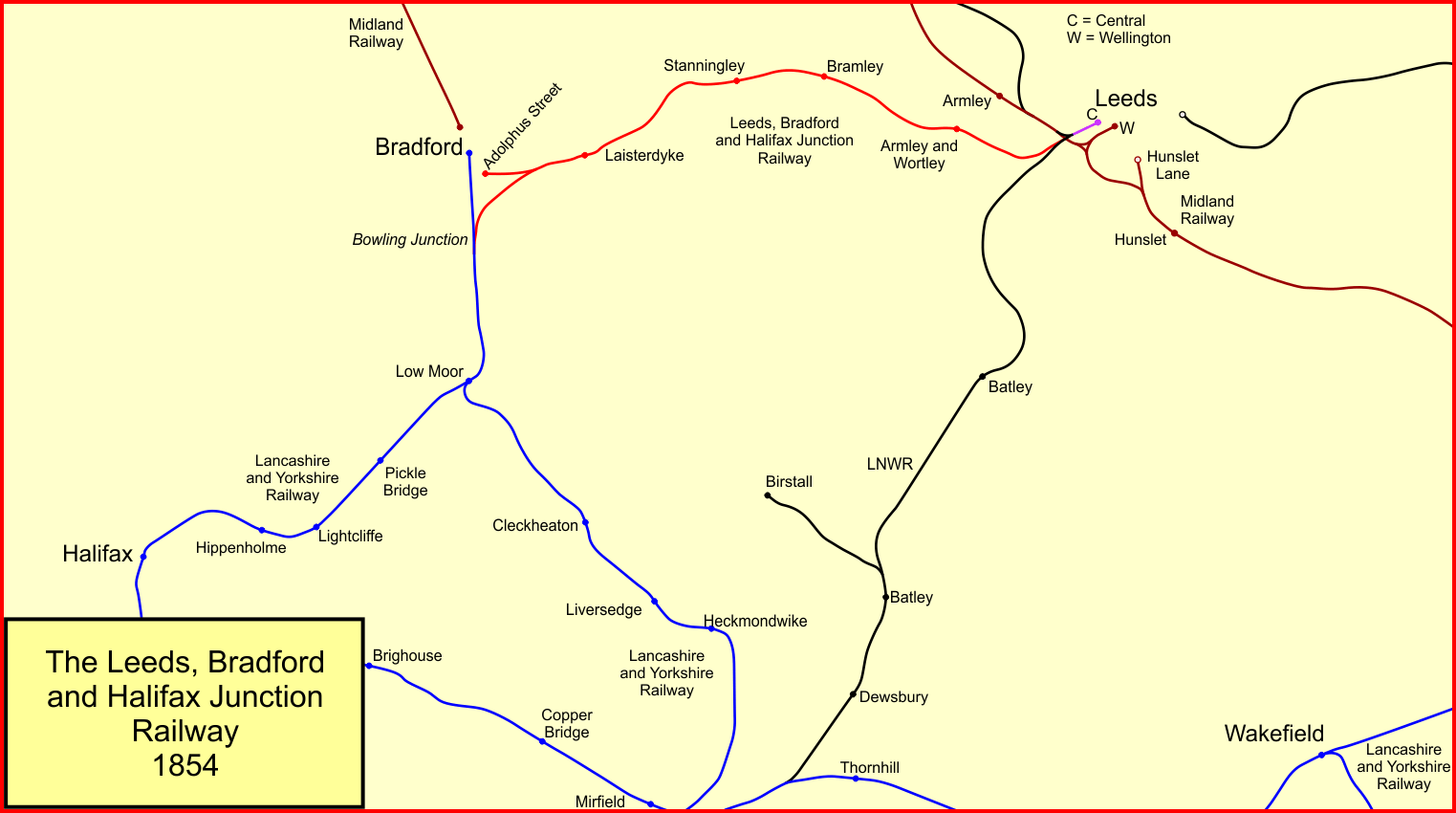
Leeds, Bradford and Halifax Junction Railway lines in 1854

In 1851 the railway network of the West Riding was developing rapidly, and a railway named the West Riding Union Railways had planned to build a line connecting Leeds, Halifax and Bradford. It had parliamentary authority in the West Riding Union Railways Act 1846 (9 & 10 Vict. c. cccxc) to do so, but in 1847 it had been subject to an amalgamation which led to the formation of the Lancashire and Yorkshire Railway. The L&YR had other priorities, and the construction of the Leeds to Bradford direct line fell away, to the dismay of the population concerned.

Leeds, Bradford and Halifax Junction Railway Act 1852
- Act of Parliament
- Parliament of the United Kingdom
- Long title: An Act for making a Railway from the Lancashire and Yorkshire Railway in the Township of Bowling near Bradford to the Railway belonging to the Lancashire and Yorkshire and London and North-western Railway Companies, or One of them, in the Township of Wortley near Leeds, all in the West Riding of the County of York, to be called The Leeds, Bradford, and Halifax Junction Railway, and for other Purposes.
- Citation: 15 & 16 Vict. c. cxviii

Dates
- Royal assent: 30 June 1852

Text of statute as originally enacted

After some time, the Leeds, Bradford and Halifax Junction Railway was promoted independently. It was authorised by the Leeds, Bradford and Halifax Junction Railway Act 1852 (15 & 16 Vict. c. cxviii) of 30 June 1852, Its route was similar to the abandoned West Riding Union Railways scheme, from a junction with the Leeds and Dewsbury Railway near Holbeck, just outside the Leeds terminus, passing on the southern margin of Bradford, to a junction with the Lancashire and Yorkshire Railway at Bowling Junction, three-quarters of a mile south of the L&YR's Bradford station.

Notwithstanding the company's title, there was no attempt to build to Halifax: the Bowling junction faced away from Bradford, and the company was given running powers over the L&YR from there to Halifax. In return, the L&YR was given running powers over the LB&HJR line. In addition the LB&HJR got running powers for the short distance into Leeds Central station. The failure by the L&YR to pursue the West Riding Union Railways scheme had considerable consequences, limiting any later L&YR expansion in the area.

== Running powers and agreements ==
Leeds, Bradford and Halifax Junction Railway Act 1853
- Act of Parliament
- Parliament of the United Kingdom
- Long title: An Act to enable the Leeds, Bradford, and Halifax Junction Railway Company to construct certain Branch Railways in the West Riding of the County of York; and for other Purposes.
- Citation: 16 & 17 Vict. c. cxi

Dates
- Royal assent: 4 August 1853

Text of statute as originally enacted

The LB&HJR arranged for the Great Northern Railway (GNR) to work its line. This enabled the GNR to incorporate through running to Halifax into its own network. The Lancashire and Yorkshire Railway (L&YR) also had running powers over the LB&HJR, and used these for through expresses. The LB&HJR line passed Bradford at some distance, and in the following parliamentary session the LB&HJR obtained authorisation for a branch line to an independent Bradford terminus, from a junction on its own line at Laister Dyke; also authorised was a colliery branch to Gildersome. The relevant act of Parliament, the Leeds, Bradford and Halifax Junction Railway Act 1853 (16 & 17 Vict. c. cxi), was passed on 4 August 1853. The Bradford terminus became known as Adolphus Street.

This act also ratified the Great Northern Railway running powers over the LB&HJR, and also over the L&YR between Bradford and Halifax.

The Great Northern Railway had built its own Low Level station adjacent to Leeds Central station in order to escape the costs of the joint Central Station, which it had previously agreed to pay for with three other companies. It now realised that its Low Level station would be unable to handle the additional traffic, and the GNR negotiated to return to the joint station. In June 1854 it secured agreement on payment of £12,000, its share of the cost of works up to that time. The GNR would be able to use the L&YR line from near the intended Holbeck Junction to Central, on payment to the L&YR of £20,000. This avoided a junction with the Leeds and Dewsbury Railway. These arrangements, and a million pounds of new capital, were sanctioned by the Great Northern Railway Act 1855 (18 & 19 Vict. c. cxxiv) of 2 July 1855.

== Opening of the main line ==
The Board of Trade inspecting officer inspected the LB&HJR main line on 11 July 1854 and was satisfied, and the line opened on 1 August 1854. The opening included the short branch to the Bradford Adolphus Street terminus. The system was double track throughout; the main line was 8 miles 66 chains (14.2 km) in length, and the Bradford branch was 1 mile 11 chains (1.8 km). The gradients were steep. Stations were at Bowling, Laister Dyke, Stanningley, Bramley, and Armley & Wortley. The exchange (high level) station at Holbeck, above the Midland station, was not opened until 2 July 1855.

Ten trains were run each way on weekdays between Leeds and Bradford, and eight each way between Leeds and Halifax. Except those including King's Cross through carriages, Halifax trains were operated by the L&YR. Through goods traffic began from 7 August 1854, but the goods stations on the line were not ready, preventing a local goods service until the end of November The Bradford Adolphus Street station was not ready for several months afterwards, and traffic was dealt with at the L&Y station in the meantime.

== Laisterdyke to Ardsley ==
Leeds, Bradford and Halifax Junction Railway Act 1854
- Act of Parliament
- Parliament of the United Kingdom
- Long title: An Act to enable the Leeds, Bradford, and Halifax Junction Railway Company to construct a Railway in extension of and to alter the Levels of Part of their Railway from Gildersome Street to East Ardsley in the West Riding of the County of York; and for other Purposes.
- Citation: 17 & 18 Vict. c. clxii

Dates
- Royal assent: 10 July 1854

Text of statute as originally enacted

Leeds, Bradford and Halifax Junction Railway Act 1855
- Act of Parliament
- Parliament of the United Kingdom
- Long title: An Act to enable the Leeds, Bradford, and Halifax Junction Railway Company to raise additional Capital; and for other Purposes.
- Citation: 18 & 19 Vict. c. xiii

Dates
- Royal assent: 5 May 1855

Text of statute as originally enacted

Leeds, Bradford and Halifax Junction Railway Act 1859
- Act of Parliament
- Parliament of the United Kingdom
- Long title: An Act to authorize the Leeds, Bradford, and Halifax Junction Railway Company to convert their Mortgage or Bond Debt into Shares or Stock; and for other Purposes.
- Citation: 22 & 23 Vict. c. cxi

Dates
- Royal assent: 13 August 1859

The LB&HJR obtained a further act of Parliament, the Leeds, Bradford and Halifax Junction Railway Act 1854 (17 & 18 Vict. c. clxii), on 10 July 1854 to extend the as-yet unfinished Gildersome branch to Ardsley, where it was to make a junction with the Bradford, Wakefield and Leeds Railway, which was authorised on the same day. The directors were able to travel over the line to Gildersome on 19 August 1856, and the line opened to the public on 20 August 1856; passenger operation was now added to its working arrangements. The branch was 5 miles 70 chains (9.5 km) in length; there were stations at Dudley Hill, Birkenshaw & Tong, Drighlington & Adwalton, and Gildersome. By the end of September five coal trains a day were working from Adwalton coalfield to Bradford. Passenger traffic was considered satisfactory considering the small local population. Ordinary goods trains started running on 1 May 1857.

The Gildersome branch curved through almost 180 degrees after leaving Laister Dyke in order to climb to a summit of nearly 700 feet (210 m) above sea level close to Dudley Hill. The authorised extension from Gildersome to Ardsley opened on 10 October 1857, with a single station at Morley, later followed by a Tingley station. The new section was 4.5 miles (7.2 km) long, and double track. It provided an alternative route between Wakefield and Bradford, but was even more heavily graded than the route via Holbeck, with gradients of 1 in 40. From 1 December a through carriage from King's Cross to Bradford was diverted over it.

== Bradford, Wakefield and Leeds Railway ==
The Bradford, Wakefield and Leeds Railway opened its main line on 3 October 1857, from Wakefield to Holbeck Junction, Leeds. The line was worked by the GNR, which thereby widened its influence in the West Riding, also securing a shortening of its route from Doncaster to Leeds. The L&YR had running powers and also ran trains on the line. The GNR was at last able to run trains from the south into Central Station at Leeds without needing to reverse them in. In addition to the main line, there was a spur from Wortley South junction to Wortley West junction, allowing through running from Wakefield to Bradford. The BW&LR had running powers over the LB&HJR, and into Leeds Central Station. The BW&LR changed its name to the West Yorkshire Railway in 1863

== Friction with the Great Northern Railway ==
The LB&HJR were not always satisfied that the relationship with the GNR was in their interests, and in October 1858 an agreement was made with the GNR, that from 1 January 1859 it would provide its own staff and rolling stock on the Gildersome and Ardsley line. This was implemented, and lasted until June 1863.

== Batley branch ==
Leeds, Bradford and Halifax Junction Railway Act 1861
- Act of Parliament
- Parliament of the United Kingdom
- Long title: An Act to authorize the Leeds, Bradford, and Halifax Junction Railway Company to construct a Branch Railway to join the Birstal Branch of the London and North-western Railway at Batley in the West Riding of the County of York; and for other Purposes.
- Citation: 24 & 25 Vict. c. lx

Dates
- Royal assent: 7 June 1861

Leeds, Bradford and Halifax Junction Railway Act 1862
- Act of Parliament
- Parliament of the United Kingdom
- Long title: An Act to authorize the Leeds, Bradford and Halifax Junction Railway Company to deviate and extend the authorized Line of their Batley Branch Railway in the West Riding of the County of York; and for other Purposes.
- Citation: 25 & 26 Vict. c. xcii

Dates
- Royal assent: 30 June 1862

Text of statute as originally enacted

The LB&HJR obtained the Leeds, Bradford and Halifax Junction Railway Act 1861 (24 & 25 Vict. c. lx) on 7 June 1861 to extend to Batley. The line opened from Adwalton Junction (on the Gildersome branch) to a temporary station at Upper Batley on 19 August 1863. The line was double track and 2 miles 31 chains in extent. The remainder of the new line, on to the LNWR Batley station, was opened on 1 November 1864. This extension had been authorised by the Leeds, Bradford and Halifax Junction Railway Act 1862 (25 & 26 Vict. c. xcii) of 30 June 1862. It was mostly on a gradient of 1 in 50.

== Bradford improvements ==
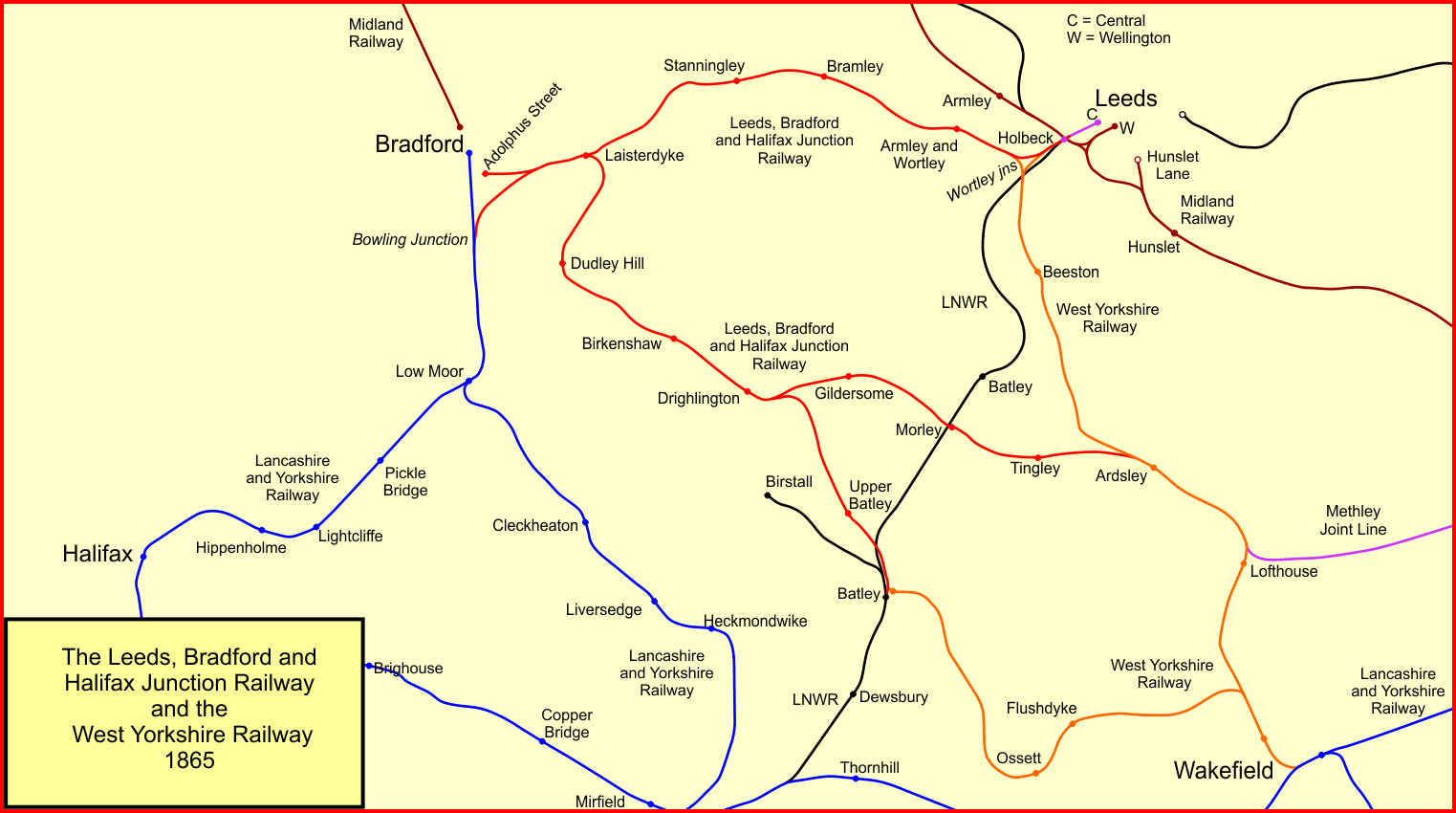
Leeds, Bradford and Halifax Junction Railway lines in 1865

By 1863 the goods traffic at Bradford, especially wool bales inwards, was overwhelming the facilities at the Adolphus Street station; the platforms were choked with consignments of wool waiting to be collected by merchants, who used railway premises as a free warehouse. Additional sidings were completed in 1864, but a scheme to spend a considerable sum on further enlargement was deferred. To relieve the situation, it was decided to transfer passenger traffic to the L&YR station, St George's (later named Bradford Exchange).

Leeds, Bradford and Halifax Junction Railway Act 1864
- Act of Parliament
- Parliament of the United Kingdom
- Long title: An Act for enabling the Leeds, Bradford, and Halifax Junction Railway Company to construct new Works and acquire additional Lands in the West Riding of the County of York; and for other Purposes.
- Citation: 27 & 28 Vict. c. clxv

Dates
- Royal assent: 14 July 1864

Text of statute as originally enacted

GNR trains on the LB&HJR could only reach St George's station by reversal at Bowling Junction, so the Leeds, Bradford and Halifax Junction Railway Act 1864 (27 & 28 Vict. c. clxv) was obtained on 14 July 1864 to authorise the LB&HJR to build a connecting line, from Hammerton Street junction on the Bradford branch to Mill Lane junction on the L&YR. The line was double, and only 57 chains long, but included Wakefield Road tunnel (132 yards (121 m)). The line was opened on 7 January 1867, (after the LB&HJR had been absorbed by the GNR,) and Adolphus Street station was given over to goods and mineral traffic. Use of the L&YR St George's station cost the GNR £1,500 a year plus a toll. The accommodation there was cramped, and the working of trains on the approach was restricted, so the arrangement was not entirely satisfactory.

== Absorbed by the Great Northern Railway ==
Great Northern, and Leeds, Bradford and Halifax Junction Railways Amalgamation Act 1865
- Act of Parliament
- Parliament of the United Kingdom
- Long title: An Act for the Amalgamation of the Leeds, Bradford, and Halifax Junction Railway Company with the Great Northern Railway Company.
- Citation: 28 & 29 Vict. c. cccxxx

Dates
- Royal assent: 5 July 1865

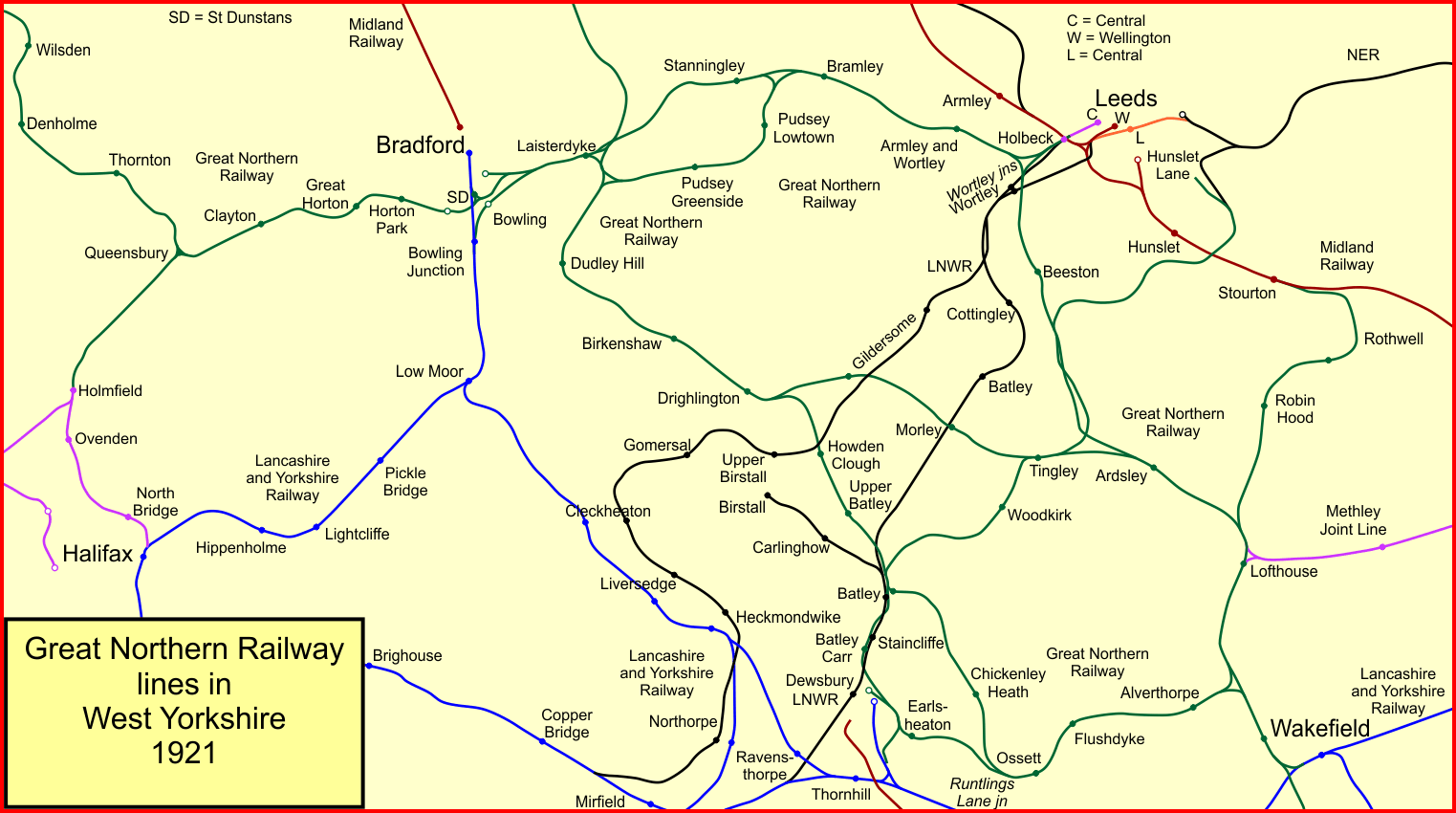
Great Northern Railway lines in West Yorkshire in 1921

The separate existence of the LB&HJR as well as of the Bradford, Wakefield and Leeds Railway was drawing to a close, and both companies were acquired by the GNR, agreed on 8 April 1863. LB&HJR proprietors were to be paid a dividend of 6%, or the same dividend as paid by the GNR, whichever was greater. The necessary absorption bill failed in Parliament in 1864, but succeeded on 5 July 1865 as the Great Northern, and Leeds, Bradford and Halifax Junction Railways Amalgamation Act 1865 (28 & 29 Vict. c. cccxxx).

The allied West Yorkshire Railway was also absorbed in 1865. The LB&HJR and West Yorkshire Railway networks at the time of the GNR taking control were important, and formed the core of considerable subsequent extension by the GNR.

== Under British Railways ==
Local services on the Gildersome branch had been curtailed in the 1950s and all the stations except Morley had been closed to passengers. Express trains continued to call at Morley until 1960, when it too was closed. At that time, the only non-local through train had been a daily King's Cross to Bradford train

Local traffic declined steeply in the 1950s, but in March 1967 a new station at New Pudsey was opened, intended as a park and ride station.

The Gildersome to Birkenshaw section was the first to be closed completely on 28 October 1966, which left two end on sidings. Then the sections from Birkenshaw to Dudley Hill and Gildersome to Morley Top were removed in March 1968, with the final stretch from Morley through Tingley to Ardsley being lifted in May 1969.

The Wortley Curve, a connecting spur between the Bradford to Leeds line and the Leeds to Wakefield Line was closed and lifted in 1985. Fears were raised at the time by Bradford people that this would end their direct services to London King's Cross. In fact the services continued by running to Leeds station and reversing there. The City of Bradford and the Transport Users Consultative Committee took British Rail to court over what they saw as an illegal closure under section 56 of the Transport Act 1962, which required British Rail to complete certain formalities before closure. Interests in Bradford were further convinced of their city losing its direct London services when the East Coast Main Line electrification, announced in 1984, would extend to Leeds, but not Bradford.

InterCity trains to and from Bradford Interchange were diverted from October 1988 to use the former Midland Railway Airedale line through Shipley and into Bradford Forster Square. This had been suggested by Bradford Council, noting that commuters from the south of Bradford, who were formerly served by the GNR lines, often drove to Leeds or Wakefield to catch fast trains to London.

This service has continued into the 21st century, with the benefit of the 1995 electrification of the Airedale line. The original Leeds to Bradford main line remains at the present day one of two routes between the two cities; the Bradford Interchange station is a reversal point for trains continuing to Halifax and beyond. The Bowling connection closed to passengers in 1969.

== Accidents and incidents ==
- On 1 August 1854 (the day of opening), a locomotive operating the inaugural train ran into the back of some coaches at Adolphus Street in Bradford. The accident was caused by the driver not applying the brake in enough time on the descent into the station. The accident resulted in minor injuries to some of the passengers on the train.
- On 4 March 1856, a train heading south on the Gildersome branch killed a local coal worker (James Hullah) whilst he was trying to lead a horse and cart across the railway a short distance north of (Drighlington &) Adwalton station.
- On 18 February 1872, a Great Northern Railway goods train had stopped at Stanningley station to attach wagons. While the engine was waiting for a passenger train to pass, the fireman started the engine without authority; the driver was engaged in oiling the locomotive. The engine moved across a crossover and was struck by the passenger train at about 30 miles per hour (48 km/h). Five persons were injured, including the goods train driver who was badly hurt. The points and signals were not interlocked.
- On 12 February 1877, a train leaving Laisterdyke to go to Gildersome was incorrectly signalled onto the Shipley Line and collided with a stationary coal train at the junction that was awaiting access to the sidings adjacent to the junction. Only minor injuries were sustained to 9 passengers and two guards. The accident resulted in the company erecting another signal at Laisterdyke East Junction with interlocking signals.
- On 17 May 1900, a passenger train travelling from Wakefield to Bradford collided with the tender of a light engine on the down line west of Laisterdyke station. The light engine was properly moving in a siding, but the exit points had previously been run through, and were lying in mid stroke. The engine was directed towards the running line. 16 passengers were injured.
- On 11 March 1901, a Lancashire and Yorkshire Railway service was split with at least one carriage taking the North Eastern Line at a junction just west of Leeds Central. The train was travelling slowly as it would be calling at Holbeck station and as it travelled over the points signaler error meant that the last carriage was diverted off of the GNR rails and onto the NER.
- On 11 July 1903, a train carrying passengers and fruit crashed into some stationary wagons at Planetrees sidings in Laisterdyke. The train had been delayed leaving Wakefield and the overloaded train had only 6 wagons in the consist with braking capacity. As the train descended from Dudley Hill to Laisterdyke (a significant gradient of 1 in 100, then 1 in 55 and finally 1 in 60) the driver found he was unable to brake on the wet rails and sped into Laisterdyke station passing through signals set at danger. There were no serious injuries, however, 28 passengers complained of minor injuries.
- On 2 December 1950, a signalman allowed two trains to enter the same section resulting in a crash at Wortley West Junction. A passenger train travelling from Low Moor to Leeds was accepted into a section before its next block ahead was clear. Whilst it was waiting for the signals to clear, it was struck from behind by another passenger train travelling from Bradford to Leeds. Injuries were sustained and railway employees were also treated for shock, but no fatalities occurred.
- On 10 November 1964, a driver lost control of his goods train as it left from Laisterdyke and rolled down the hill towards Adolphus Street. The engine and its wagons crashed through the retaining wall and ended up in the street below. The crew jumped clear of the locomotive before the crash.

== Stations ==
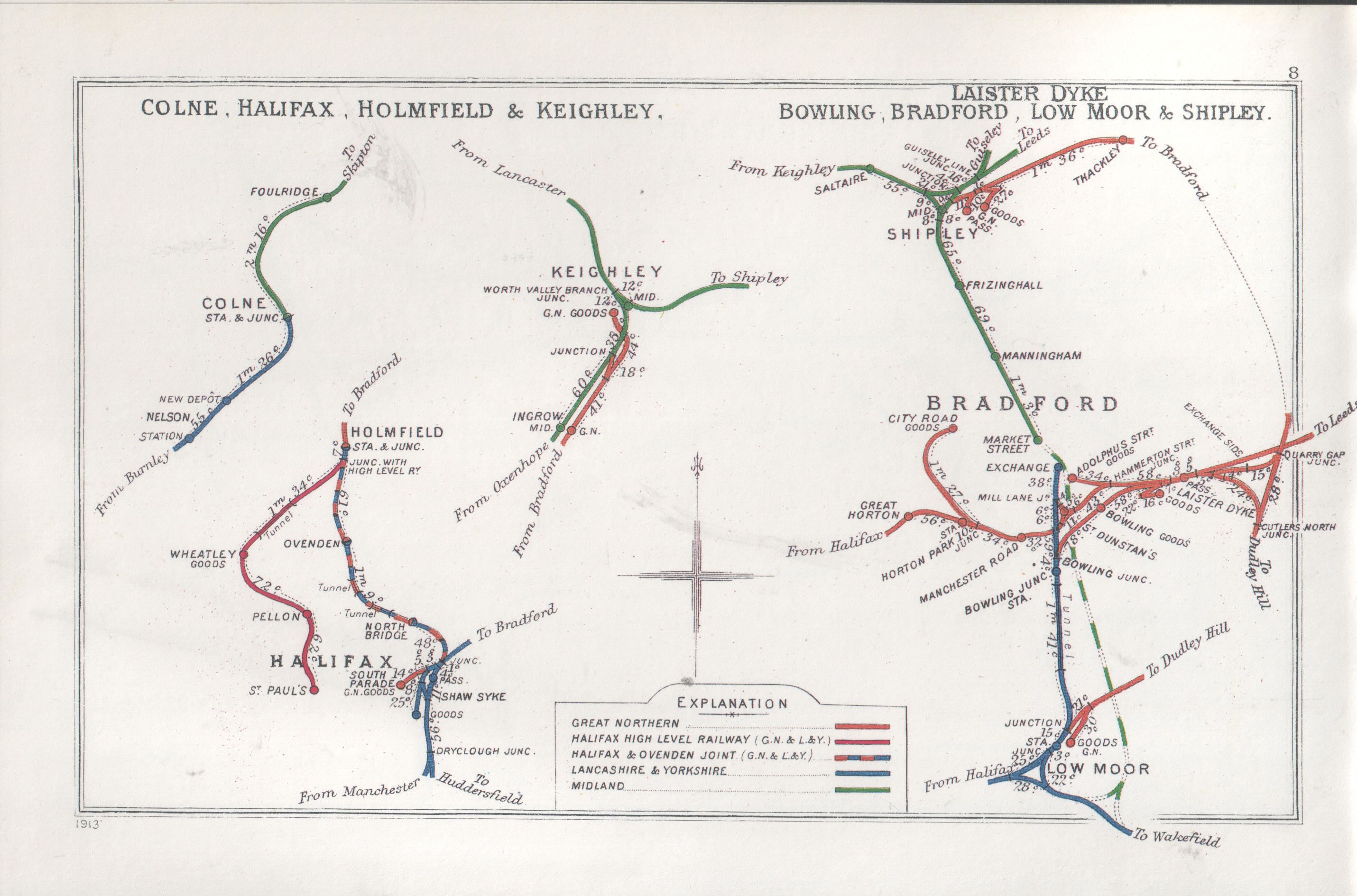
Colne, Halifax, Holmfield & Keighley Laister Dyke, Bowling, Bradford, Low Moor & Shipley RJD 8

=== Bradford to Leeds section ===
The list below details the stations on the LB&HJR between Bradford and Leeds. New Pudsey was opened by British Rail in 1967, so is not included. All of the stations on the line were approved for closure by Barbara Castle MP maintaining that this would improve services between Leeds and Bradford. With the exception of Stanningley, all of the stations on the line were closed in July 1966. Bramley re-opened under the West Yorkshire PTE in 1983.

Between Bradford Adolphus Street and Holbeck Junction, the line ran to 8.5 miles (13.7 km) with Stanningley viaduct (200 yards (180 m)) and Hillfoot Tunnel (400 yards (370 m)) being the major engineered structures on the line.

Name	Coordinates	Closed to passengers	Closed completely
Adolphus Street	53°47′23.9″N 1°44′43.6″W	6 January 1867	1 May 1972
Bowling	53°47′11.8″N 1°44′13.0″W	1 February 1895	4 May 1964
Laisterdyke (Note: Was listed as Laister Dyke in Bradshaw's Guides and on Railway Clearing House mapping.)	53°47′29.2″N 1°43′00.0″W	2 July 1966	May 1978
Stanningley (for Farsley)	53°48′18.7″N 1°39′54.9″W	30 December 1967	1979
Bramley	53°48′19.9″N 1°38′16.1″W	2 July 1966	
Armley Moor (Note: Opened as Armley and Wortley. Was renamed Armley Moor in September 1950.)	53°47′42.9″N 1°35′47.6″W	2 July 1966	1984
Holbeck (High Level)	53°47′35.8″N 1°33′48.2″W	5 July 1958	

=== Laisterdyke to Ardsley section ===
The line opened with six new stations, but local services could call at a total of twelve on the run through from Bradford to Wakefield. Exchange/Adolphus Street, Laisterdyke and St Dunstans in the Bradford area and Ardsley, Lofthouse & Outwood (Note: Lofthouse & Outwood was closed in 1960, but Outwood station (1988) was built 7 chains (460 ft; 140 m) north of the Lofthouse station site.) and Westgate in the Wakefield area. In 1950, Morley station was renamed 'Morley Top' to distinguish it from the Morley station on the Leeds to Dewsbury line (ex London North Western Railway and London Midland Scottish Railway lines). The two stations had been referred to as 'Top' and 'Low' by local people long before British Rail added in the names to avoid confusion. In June 1961, the suffix '& Adwalton' was dropped from Drighlington station.

Name	Coordinates	Closed to passengers	Closed completely
Dudley Hill	53°46′24.5″N 1°43′16.0″W	5 April 1952	17 December 1979
Birkenshaw & Tong	53°45′29.6″N 1°41′14.7″W	3 October 1953	7 September 1964
Drighlington & Adwalton	53°44′50.5″N 1°39′46.4″W	30 December 1951	1 June 1964
Gildersome	53°45′02.9″N 1°37′54.5″W	11 June 1955	16 March 1968
Morley Top	53°44′26.8″N 1°36′00.6″W	31 December 1960	5 May 1969
Tingley	53°44′06.1″N 1°34′30.4″W	30 January 1954	5 May 1969

== Modern day ==
The only section of the LB&HJR that is open is from Mill Lane Junction in Bradford to Holbeck Junction in Leeds, which sees services using it as part of the Calder Valley line. The final stretch of line from what was Laisterdyke East Junction into Mill lane at Bradford (1 mile 54 chains (2.7 km)) is still annotated on railway mapping as being 191 miles (307 km) from London King's Cross that was measured via the Gildersome Branch.

The section of cutting just south of Drighlington village was used first as a landfill site and was then built on when the A650 road bypassed the village in 1991. Further west at Tong Moor, a small section of the former trackbed is now a footpath along the edge of the Tong Moor Nature Reserve.

Dudley Hill remained open until August 1981 to serve the distribution depot of a steelholder. After the lines around Bradford were closed and lifted, access to Dudley Hill was via a very long siding from Bowling Junction. This line used to connect at Laisterdyke, but since the Gildersome's Branch closure, access was available only by going north from Halifax and turning off after the former Bowling Junction station and heading east avoiding Bradford. Previously at Laisterdyke, the line intersected with the other Great Northern lines in the area, but it curved through Cutlers Junction and turned 180 degrees to go to Dudley Hill.

In 1985, British Rail reconnected the junction to the west of what was Laisterdyke station to permit access from the Leeds to Bradford line, which allowed the closure of the section from Bowling to Laisterdyke. The reconnection was to enable metal to be forwarded from a scrap dealer whose yard was adjacent to the line. English, Welsh & Scottish Railway used this section sporadically to forward scrap metal to either Alexandra Dock in Liverpool or Port Talbot steelworks. All trains had to access the terminal by heading towards Bradford from Leeds and then reversing in as no crossover was fitted. The trains then left via a run-round manoeuvre in Bradford Interchange before heading south via Halifax, where the Port Talbot trains would take the curve towards Brighouse and pass through, or either recess at, Healey Mills Yard.

New stations have been proposed for opening at Bowling (junction) and at Laisterdyke. The area around where Laisterdyke station used to be is now short on space when formerly it was an important station with 7 lines radiating from it. It is projected that a new station at Laisterdyke could attract passenger numbers of 558,000 per year.

== Distances ==
Laisterdyke was the summit of the Leeds to Bradford line, with the line falling at between 1 in 100 to 1 in 50 down to Leeds and a small but sharp drop of 1 in 50 down to Exchange. The total route mileage as measured by the LNER had Leeds Central to Bradford Exchange as 9.3 miles (15.0 km). The full distance from Wakefield Westgate to Bradford Exchange was 15.75 miles (25.35 km).

From	To	Distance	Total route mileage	Closure Date
Holbeck Junction	Laisterdyke	6 miles 49 chains (10.6 km)	6 miles 49 chains (10.6 km)	Still open
Laisterdyke	Ardsley	10 miles 18 chains (16.5 km)	16 miles 67 chains (27.1 km)	Closed completely by August 1981
Laisterdyke	Hammerton Street	58 chains (3,800 ft; 1,200 m)	17 miles 45 chains (28.3 km)	Still open
Hammerton Street	Adolphus Street	34 chains (2,200 ft; 680 m)	17 miles 79 chains (28.9 km)	May 1972
Laisterdyke	Bowling Junction	1 mile 76 chains (3.1 km)	19 miles 77 chains (32.1 km)	August 1981
Hammerton Street	Mill Lane Junction	60 chains (4,000 ft; 1,200 m)	20 miles 57 chains (33.3 km)	Still Open

== Gallery ==
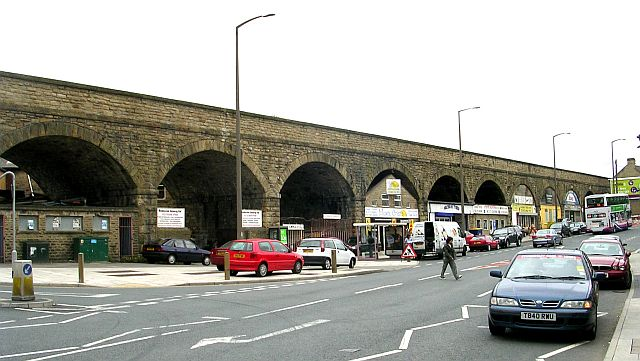
Railway Line over Road at Stanningley.

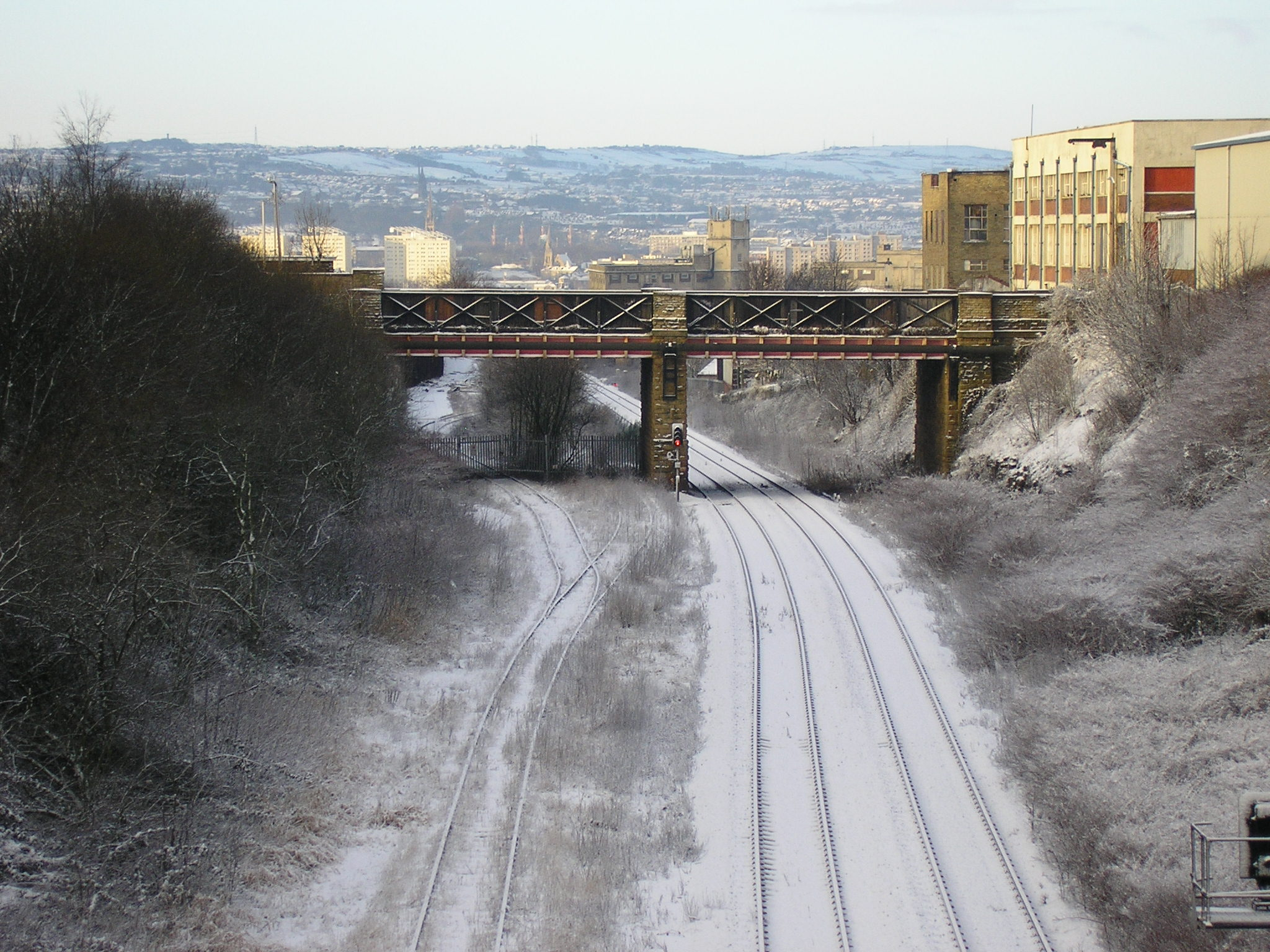
Leeds to Bradford Railway Line looking west towards Bradford. The bridge is Planetrees Road and the sidings on the left are for the scrapyard.

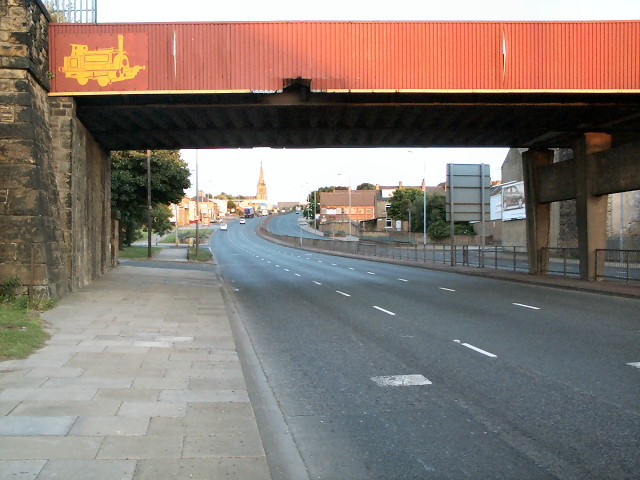
Wakefield Road, Bradford, looking south up the A650 road. This bridge used to carry the Bowling to Laisterdyke line.

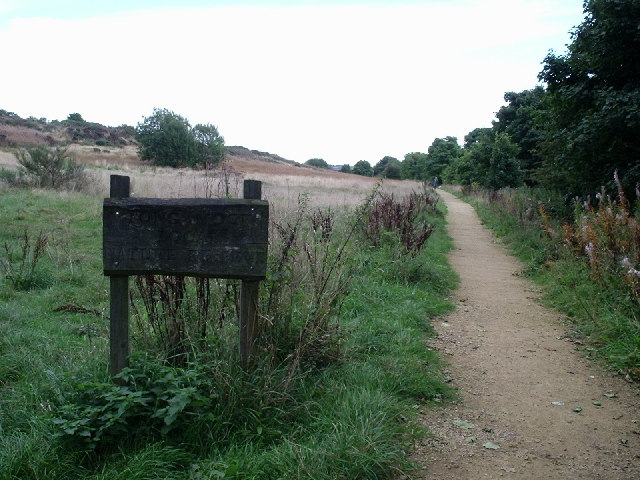
Tong Moor Nature Reserve - looking east.

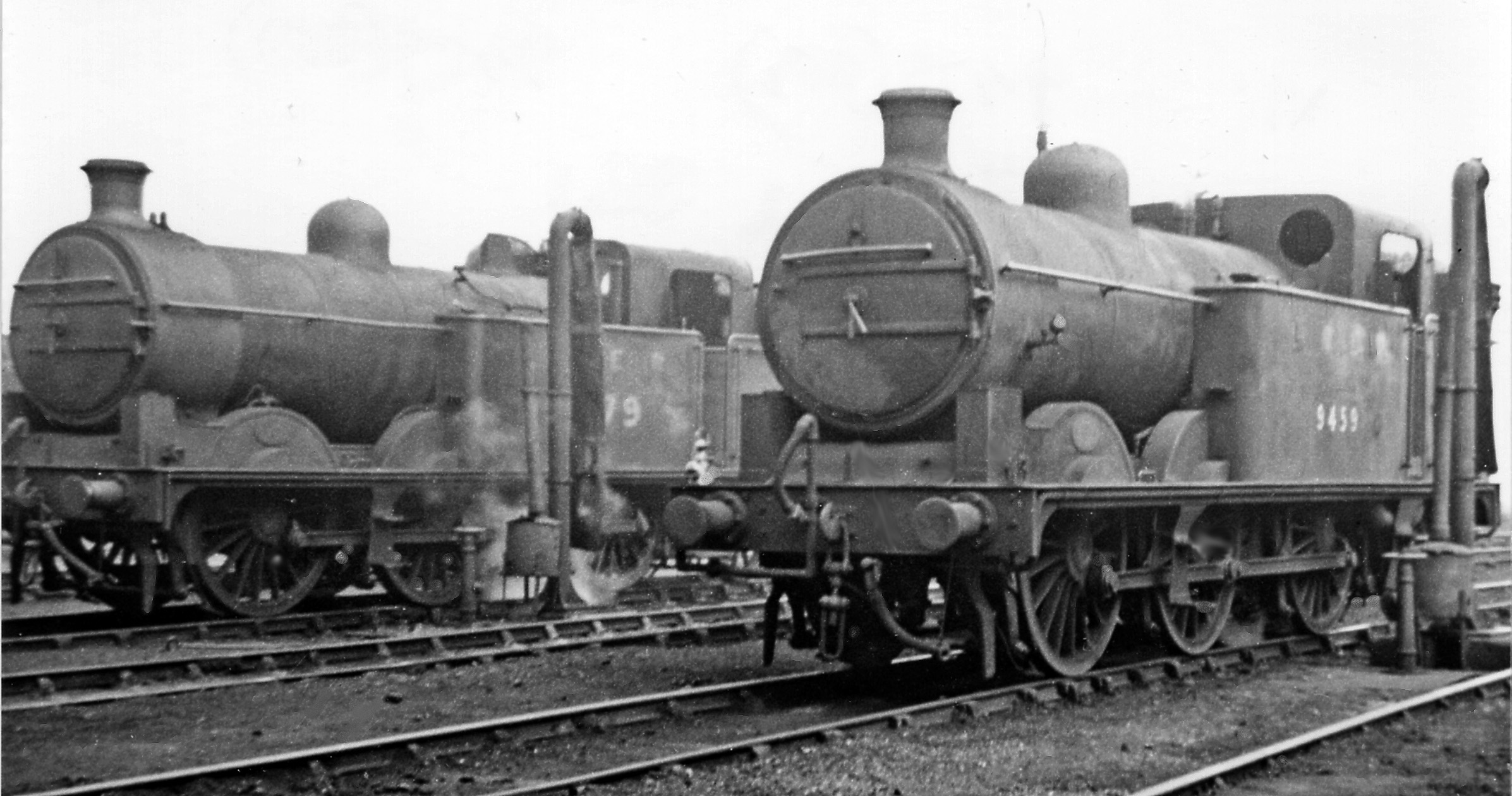
Bradford Hammerton Street Locomotive Depot.

== See also ==
The Great Northern Railway in Yorkshire
