= Listed buildings in Leeds (City and Hunslet Ward - southern area) =

City and Hunslet is a ward in the metropolitan borough of the City of Leeds, West Yorkshire, England. It contains over 400 listed buildings that are recorded in the National Heritage List for England. Of these, eight are listed at Grade I, the highest of the three grades, 30 at Grade II*, the middle grade, and the others are at Grade II, the lowest grade.

Leeds is the largest city in Yorkshire, and has been a commercial centre since the 15th century. Its major industry has been textiles, especially wool, and later flax, the latter becoming a speciality of the city. Transport was provided by the Aire and Calder Navigation, begun in 1699, the Leeds and Liverpool Canal, opened in 1777, and the railways from the 1830s. The commercial centre developed to the north of the railway and river, with mills mainly around the river, and factories to the south of this producing machine parts for the mills, locomotives, and other items. This history is reflected by the listed buildings. The growing wealth of the area resulted in the building of Georgian houses and terraces in the later 18th and early 19th centuries, and this was following later in the 19th century by grand buildings housing offices, warehouses, banks and hotels. In due course impressive civic buildings, theatres and shopping arcades followed.

This list includes the listed buildings in the area to the south of the railway running from west to east on the south of the centre of the city. It contains the areas of Holbeck, Hunslet, and parts of Beeston Hill and Stourton. The northern part of the area is largely industrial, with more residential parts to the south. The listed buildings include mills, warehouses, factories and the remains of factories, many of which have been converted for other uses. The River Aire and the Aire and Calder Navigation pass through the area, and listed buildings associated with these include locks, a dock basin, a weir, cranes, retaining walls. The other listed buildings include civic buildings, houses and associated structures, churches, chapels and associated structures, public houses, bridges, and two war memorials.

== Key ==
Grade	Criteria
I	Buildings of exceptional interest, sometimes considered to be internationally important
II*	Particularly important buildings of more than special interest
II	Buildings of national importance and special interest

== Buildings ==
Name and location	Photograph	Date	Notes	Grade
17 and 19 Bridge End; 53.79380°N 1.54143°W		Mid 18th century	A house in whitewashed brick, with long and short chamfered quoins, and a hipped tile roof. On the front are four storeys and four bays with a three-storey one-bay extension to the right, and on the left return, facing the river, are five storeys and three bays. In the ground floor are modern shop fronts, and the windows are sashes with voussoirs and keystones, and moulded sills.	II
3, 4 and 5 Briggate and 1 and 2 Blands Yard; 53.79470°N 1.54253°W		Early 18th century	A house, later shops and store rooms, in brick, partly rendered, with quoins, a modillion eaves cornice, and a grey slate roof. There are three storeys and a front of seven bays, the middle three bays projecting. In the ground floor are shop fronts, and a round-arched passage entrance with moulded imposts and a keystone. The upper floors contain sash windows, some with keystones, and at the rear are wings containing segmental-headed windows and a canted bay window.	II
16 Dock Street; 53.79350°N 1.54057°W		Mid 18th century	A house at the end of a row, in rendered brick on a chamfered plinth, with quoins, bracketed eaves, and a slate roof. There are three storeys and three bays. The doorway in the right bay has a three-light fanlight and a cornice, and the windows are sashes with keystones.	II
10 and 12 Dock Street; 53.79342°N 1.54073°W		Mid to late 18th century	Possibly a warehouse, then a sailors' chapel and later offices, the building is in rendered brick, with three storeys and three bays. The doorway on the left has a three-light fanlight and a keystone. The windows are sashes, those in the left and middle bays with architraves, keystones and moulded sills, and those in the right bay plainer. At the rear is a wide window with a basket arch.	II
River Lock and walls 53.79287°N 1.54840°W		1770–76	The lock is at the junction of the Leeds and Liverpool Canal and the River Aire. The walls are in gritstone, and there are two pairs of wooden gates with cast iron fittings. The walls extend for about 15 metres (49 ft) to form the retaining walls for the river, and pass under a footbridge with stone steps.	II*
Basin Lock; 53.79305°N 1.55137°W		1770–77	The lock on the Leeds and Liverpool Canal has retaining walls in millstone grit, and gates in wood and iron. There is a walkway across the western gates, and the paddle mechanism is boxed.	II
Bridge 226 and wall 53.79304°N 1.55106°W		1770–77	The bridge carries Wharf Approach over the Leeds and Liverpool Canal. It is in stone and consists of a single segmental arch. The bridge has voussoirs and buttresses that are vermiculated and rusticated, the parapet has incised panels, and a wall at the west end of the south parapet links with the canal company office.	II
Retaining walls and graving docks 53.79306°N 1.54897°W		1770–77	The retaining wall of the Leeds and Liverpool Canal are in gritstone, and extend from River Lock to Bridge No. 226. The two graving docks were added later, they are on the north side of the canal, and have stepped sides.	II
Chadwick Lodge, wall and railings 53.79241°N 1.53592°W		Late 18th century	A house in millstone grit with sill bands, and a hipped slate roof. There are two storeys and a basement, and a front of five bays, the middle three bays rusticated and projecting under a moulded pediment containing an elliptical window in the tympanum. On the garden front, paired flights of steps with railings lead up to the central doorway that has Tuscan three-quarter columns, an architrave, moulded imposts, a semicircular fanlight, an entablature, a cornice, and a triangular pediment. The windows are sashes, the window above the doorway with fluted pilasters, and the others with voussoirs. At the rear is a retaining wall with railings.	II*
Wall, gates and gate piers, Chadwick Lodge; 53.79253°N 1.53601°W		Late 18th century	The boundary wall is in gritstone with flat and rounded coping, and is about 20 metres (66 ft) long and 1.25 metres (4 ft 1 in) high. It contains a carriage entrance and a pedestrian gateway with wrought iron gates. The carriage entrance has monolithic piers with groined tops.	II
Burton House; 53.77847°N 1.54261°W		Late 18th century	A red brick house with bands, a moulded dentilled cornice, and a hipped slate roof. There are two storeys, a front of five bays, the middle three projecting under a pediment, and a one-bay rear wing. The central doorway has engaged Roman Doric columns, a traceried fanlight, and an open pediment, and the windows are sashes. In the right return is a two-storey bow window, in the rear wing is a Venetian window, and the left return contains a round-headed stair window, a doorway with a moulded architrave, a fanlight, a fluted frieze and a cornice, and a bow window.	II
	c. 1776	The warehouse was built for the Leeds and Liverpool Canal Company and converted into offices in 1994–95. It is in gritstone with quoins, bands, paired gutter brackets, and a stone slate roof with coped gables, hipped to the right. There are four storeys, six bays, and a single-storey addition on the left. A glazed entrance has been added to the south front. The windows vary, some have mullions, there is a lunette, and in the gable end is a circular window. The loading doors have segmental arches and quoined jambs.	II*	
Former Salem United Reformed Church; 53.79230°N 1.54103°W		1789	The chapel, which is now used for other purposes, was altered in 1901 by the addition of an elliptical front. It is in gritstone, with chamfered quoins, a modillion cornice, a parapet with carved wreaths, and a slate roof, hipped at the front. There are two storeys and an elliptical plan. Curved steps lead up to the entrance that has paired doors with pilasters and an entablature, flanked by stairway doorways and round-arched windows, all with keystones. In the upper floor are flat-headed windows with moulded sills, aprons and keystones.	II
32–38 Dock Street; 53.79381°N 1.53894°W		c. 1790–90	A house, warehouse and workshops, later used for other purposes, the building is in red brick with stone slate roofs. There are three storeys and ten bays. In the ground floor are two round-arched doorways with semicircular fanlights, and between them a doorway with a flat head, a plain surround and a three-light fanlight. The windows are sashes with segmental heads, and in the left two bays the openings are blind.	II
Midland Junction Foundry; 53.79066°N 1.55603°W		1793	The former engineering factory is in red brick with stone dressings, and is roofed in corrugated asbestos. There are two parallel ranges with a bridging link forming an H-shaped plan, all with three storeys. The west range has 20 bays, and includes loading doors. The other range was a steam-powered factory with eleven bays, and included a boiler house and an engine house. At the northeast corner is the square base of a former chimney.	II
Former foundry for Fenton, Murray and Wood; 53.79163°N 1.55205°W		c. 1795	The former foundry was built by Matthew Murray, and is in brown brick with a hipped corrugated asbestos roof. There is a single storey, five bays, and a lean-to addition to the north. The central doorway is arched and flanked by tall windows with segmental arches and small panes. The central arch at the rear has Tuscan columns with imposts.	II*
99 Water Lane; 53.79170°N 1.55159°W		c. 1795–98	A former foundry workshop, it is in red-brown brick and has a corrugated asbestos roof with stone gable coping. The gabled end facing the lane has three storeys and five bays, and the building extends back for seven bays. The front facing the lane contains a wide entrance, sash windows with cambered heads, and blocked loading doors. The building is considered to be the substantial surviving remains of the foundry built by Matthew Murray, and is part of probably the first integrated engineering works in the world.	II*
Former machine and fitting shops, Fenton, Murray and Wood; 53.79138°N 1.55199°W		1795–1802	The building, which was extended in 1841, is in red-brown brick, partly rendered, with stepped gutter brackets and a slate roof. There are three storeys and nine bays, and a lower three-storey three-bay block to the south. The building contains loading doors, windows with slightly cambered heads, and an inserted vehicular access.	II*
Former workshop range of Fenton, Murray and Wood; 53.79142°N 1.55227°W		1797	The foundry workshops were built by Matthew Murray, and later extensively rebuilt. The building is in brick with slate roofs, and has a single storey. There are three continuous ranges with a total of 18 bays. Most of the windows are multi-paned, with flat, cambered or segmental heads.	II
3, 4 and 5 Blayd's Yard; 53.79471°N 1.54275°W		c. 1800	A row of three houses and workshops in red-brown brick with three storeys. The openings have cambered heads, the doorways have fanlights, and the windows include sashes, some slide-sliding, some are fixed, and others are blocked.	II
20 and 22 Dock Street; 53.79360°N 1.54007°W		c. 1800	A warehouse and workshops, later used for other purposes, the building is in red brick with stone slate roofs. No. 20 on the right has three storeys and two bays, and contains a doorway and a round-headed passageway. No. 22 has four storeys and an attic, five bays, and a projecting bay on the left. The doorways and windows have segmental-arched heads, in the left bay are loading doors, and in the middle bay is a wide flat-arched entrance.	II
30 Dock Street; 53.79377°N 1.53929°W		c. 1800	A warehouse and workshops, later used for other purposes, the building is in red brick with a stone slate roof. There are three storeys and five bays. In the centre is a doorway in a wide arched opening, and above it is a round-arched loading door converted into a window. The other windows are sashes with segmental heads.	II
101 Water Lane; 53.79172°N 1.55181°W		c. 1800	A house and storeroom later used for other purposes, it is in red brick with a slate roof, two storeys and seven bays. On the front is a carriage entrance and a doorway, and sash windows that either have cambered or flat heads. At the rear is a later range with two storeys and four bays.	II
Riverside House; 53.79374°N 1.53951°W		c. 1800	A warehouse or workshops in ref brick with a slate roof. There are three storeys and six bays. The windows have segmental heads, and there are three doorways.	II
15 and 17 High Court Lane; 53.79513°N 1.53718°W		Late 18th to early 19th century	A pair of houses on an angled corner site, they are in red brick with a grey slate roof. There are three storeys and each house has one bay. In the ground floor is a paired doorway with a cambered head and a flat headed garage opening, and the windows in the lower two floors have cambered heads.	II
19 High Court Lane; 53.79503°N 1.53717°W		Late 18th to early 19th century	A red brick house with a grey slate roof, three storeys and three bays. In the centre are paired doorways with fanlights and a hood. The windows in the lower two floors have slightly cambered heads, and at the rear is a stair window.	II
Former flax warehouse, Marshall Mill; 53.79149°N 1.55379°W		1808	The former warehouse has a cast iron frame, with walls in red brick and a slate roof. There are three storeys and ten bays. The building contains doorways and windows with segmental-arched heads, the windows are small-paned with stone sills, and on the west side are loading doors.	II*
Wall and workshop, Marshall's Mill; 53.79116°N 1.55394°W		c. 1808	The boundary wall of the mills is in gritstone with flat coping, it is about 3 metres (9.8 ft) high, and extends for about 50 metres (160 ft). On the wall are wrought iron railings, and against the east side of the wall is a former workshop in brick with a grey slate roof. This has a single storey, and contains two doorways, and three windows with wedge lintels.	II
Former canal office, lock-keeper's house, wall and railings 53.79293°N 1.55128°W		1816	The former Canal Company office is in stone, with corner pilasters, a deep eaves cornice and blocking course, and a hipped slate roof. There is one storey and a basement, and two bays. The central doorway has a plain surround, and a cornice hood, above which is carved lettering. The flanking windows are tripartite sashes in segmental-arched recesses. The lock-keeper's house at the rear is in red brick with a hipped slate roof and sash windows. In front of the office are three steps, a low wall of rusticated stone with stepped coping, railings, and a pedestrian gate.	II
Marshall's Mills; 53.79073°N 1.55316°W		1817	A former flax mill, which was later extended, the buildings are red-brown brick with slate roofs, and there are three ranges forming a U-shaped plan. The original north range has five storeys and an attic, 14 bays, the middle two bays projecting, and a square chimney stack. The south range, which was added in 1827, has six storeys and 13 bays, and the east range, linking the two, was added in 1830, and has six storeys and eleven bays. The windows vary; some have round heads, others have segmental heads, and there are lunettes and oculi.	II*
Former Marshall Mills Schoolroom; 53.78977°N 1.55447°W		1822 (probable)	The former schoolroom is in brown brick, rendered on three sides, with a hipped slate roof. There are two storeys and three bays. The windows have flat heads, one is blocked, and there is a blocked doorway.	II
Thwaite Mills; 53.77628°N 1.50401°W		1823–25	A water mill that was later extended, and subsequently converted into a museum, it is in red brick with a slate roof. There are two storeys and attics, and a rectangular plan over a mill race, with nine bays, a four-bay extension to the south, and a canted engine house at the north end. The windows are rectangular and in the attics are gabled dormers, there are two segmental-arched openings to the waterwheels, and two bays have loading doors. The engine house has a circular chimney, and inside the mill are two breastshot water wheels.	II
Bridge over mill stream and wall, Thwaite Mills; 53.77622°N 1.50385°W		1823–25	The bridge is in sandstone, and consists of two segmental arches over the outlets from the water wheels. The bridge has a band, and a parapet with rounded coping, and there is a retaining wall with a flight of stone steps.	II
Yarn warehouse 53.79198°N 1.52914°W		1824	The former warehouse is in red brick with a corrugated asbestos roof. There are three storeys facing the street and four facing the river, and seven bays. On the street front is a doorway with a rusticated surround, on the river front is a loft doorway converted into a window, and the other windows are casements.	II
1 Church Row; 53.79523°N 1.53698°W		Early 19th century	A house, later a public house, in brick, with a sill band, an eaves band, and a hipped slate roof. There are two storeys, a front of two bays, and sash windows. The central doorway has pilasters, a fanlight and an entablature. In the ground floor of the right return, the doorway and window are in round-arched recesses with an impost. At the rear are six bays and a shop window.	II
32 and 34 The Calls; 53.79491°N 1.53907°W		Early 19th century	A mill and warehouse converted in 1994–95 for residential and other uses. The building is in red brick, rendered on the ground floor and the east gable, and it has a slate roof with coped gables. There are six storeys on the front, seven at the rear overlooking the river, and 14 bays. On the front, two bays contain loading doors, and in the others are segmental-arched windows. At the rear is a band, and in the basement are wide segmental arches with voussoirs and keystones.	II
2 Water Lane; 53.79304°N 1.54258°W		Early 19th century	A former warehouse overlooking the River Aire, it has a ground floor in stone and brick above, with buttressed corners, eaves brackets, two lengths of pedimented parapet, and a hipped slate roof. There are four storeys and 20 bays. The ground floor, which is partly rusticated, contains three round-arched doorways. The windows have slight segmental arches, and there are loading bays above the doorways, some converted into windows.	II
Dyeworks and attached warehouse 53.79283°N 1.53098°W		Early 19th century	The dyeworks, workshop and warehouse are in red brick and have slate roofs with coped gables. The dyeworks has four storeys and three bays. It contains a large central round-arched doorway, above it are loading doors, and the window are casements. To the left is a two-storey workshop, and beyond is the warehouse, with three storeys and a garret, and three bays.	II
Fletland Mills; 53.79469°N 1.53816°W		Early 19th century	Warehouses, a mill and offices, later converted for other uses, in brick with stone dressings and slate roofs. The building consists of three parallel gabled ranges, overlooking the River Aire at the rear, and a two-storey two-bay office block with sash windows. The other ranges contain windows, some of which have segmental heads, some with small panes, loading doors and hoists.	II
Joiners' Shop and Saw Mill to former foundry 53.79145°N 1.55254°W		Early 19th century (probable)	The joiners' shop, saw mill and outbuildings were built for Matthew Murray, and have since been altered and used for other purposes. They are in red-brown brick with stepped gutter brackets, and slate roofs with coped gables. There are three ranges enclosing three sides of a yard, two ranges have three storeys and the other has two. They contain various openings, and most of the windows are casements.	II
Machine Shop and office 53.79255°N 1.53114°W	—	Early 19th century	The building is in red brick with stone dressings and a slate roof. There are two storeys and on the front are two gabled bays. The building contains various openings, most with segmental heads.	II
Old Red Lion public house 53.79302°N 1.54218°W		Early 19th century	The public house is on an island site, and a shop was added later. It is stuccoed and has a hipped slate roof. There are three storeys, an entrance front of three bays, and six bays on the left return. The doorways and some of the ground floor windows have pilasters and cornices on consoles. The other windows are sashes, and above the main doorway is a statue of a lion, painted red, on brackets.	II
Simpson's Fold Warehouse; 53.79389°N 1.54125°W		Early 19th century	A pair of former warehouses, they are in red brick on a stone plinth, with a roof mainly slated and partly tiled. The main block has four storeys and attics, and there is a narrower block with five storeys, a modillion cornice, and a pedimented parapet. Most of the openings have segmental heads, including tiers of loading doors, at the top of which are segmental canopies with lunettes.	II
Machine Shop, Thwaite Mills; 53.77635°N 1.50362°W		Early 19th century	The building is in red brick, it is built on a sandstone retaining wall, and has a slate roof with a coped gable. There is a single storey and a rectangular plan. In the gable end is a doorway, and the windows have small panes.	II
Aire and Calder Navigation; Cut and locks 53.79247°N 1.53284°W		c. 1830–40 (probable)	The cut on the Aire and Calder Navigation was made to pass the Leeds Dam, and it contains two sets of locks. The cut is about 200 metres (660 ft) long, and between 10 metres (33 ft) and 25 metres (82 ft) wide. Its lining and edges are in stone, and there are parallel lock chambers at the east end.	II
Bank Mills B and D 53.79226°N 1.53037°W		1831–32	A flax mill that was extended in 1856 and in 1888, it is in brick with stone dressings and slate roofs. The original block has six storeys, 21 bays, sill bands, and a partial parapet. At the west end is a square chimney, and at the east end is a circular stair and hoist turret. The 1856 extension is to the southeast and has four storeys and fronts of nine and six bays. At the rear is the 1888 block that has five storeys and twelve bays, a mansard roof, and a gabled hoist dormer. The windows in all parts are casements.	II
Bank Mills C and warehouse 53.79168°N 1.52875°W		1832–33	A flax mill and an attached tow warehouse, later converted into offices, they are in red brick with stone dressings and hipped slate roofs. Both parts have sill bands and a parapet. The mill has five storeys at the front and six at the rear, 16 bays, and a chimney stack. In the tow warehouse are five storeys and eight bays, with a single-bay link between the two.	II
East range, Victoria Flax Mill; 53.78469°N 1.52516°W		c. 1835–38	The former mill is in red brick and has a slate roof with coped gables. The range is at right angles to the street and has six storeys and 14 bays, with three bays and a stair block facing the street, and a lower engine house and chimney at the north end. The openings have segmental-arched heads.	II
Bollard, Neptune Street; 53.79317°N 1.53182°W		Early to mid 19th century	The bollard on Neptune Street is in cast iron. It is in the form of a cannon and cannonball, and has ribbed moulding midway up the shaft.	II
Thwaite House; 53.77590°N 1.50423°W		Early to mid 19th century	The former mill manager's house is in red brick with stone dressings, corner pilasters, a sill band, and a slate roof, hipped to the left. There are two storeys and cellars, and three bays. Five steps lead up to a central round-headed recess containing the doorway, which has a sandstone architrave, pilaster jambs, a semicircular fanlight, outer pilasters, and a cornice on consoles. The windows are sashes, and at the rear is a giant round-arched recess containing a doorway and a round-headed stair window above.	II
Warehouse, office and drying floor, Thwaite Mills; 53.77600°N 1.50361°W		Early to mid 19th century (probable)	The mill building is in red brick with a slate roof, two storeys, and a south front of five bays. In the centre of this front is a segmental-arched wagon entrance with long-and-short jambs and stepped voussoirs, and flat-headed windows. On the north front are buttresses forming four bays, each bay containing two round-headed arches, and at the east end is a large chimney.	II
Hunslet Baptist Tabernacle; 53.78159°N 1.52707°W		1835–37	The chapel is in brick, rendered on the front, with moulded sill bands, dentilled eaves and a hipped slate roof. There are two storeys, four bays at the front and sides, and a two-storey rear bay. On the front is a projecting porch containing two round-arched doorways with fanlights, a cornice and a blocking course. The windows are round-arched, those in the ground floor with keystones and impost bands.	II
East and northeast ranges, Victoria Mills; 53.79295°N 1.54435°W		1836	The mill ranges, later used for other purposes, are in red brick with slate roofs. There is an L-shaped plan, the east wing with five storeys, 13 bays and a canted end bay, and the northeast range with four storeys and six bays. The front facing the River Aire has a pedimented gable and five bays. This front has loading doors in the middle bay, and at the apex is a datestone flanked by scrolls. Most of the openings have cambered heads, most of the windows are casements, and some are sashes.	II
Victoria Bridge; 53.79260°N 1.54701°W		1837–39	The bridge carries Neville Street over the River Aire. It is in stone and consists of a single elliptical arch. The bridge has rusticated voussoirs, a cornice with mutules, and abutments with wide pilasters carried up to the parapets that have incised Greek motifs. In the centre of the bridge is a plaque with a wreath and the name of the bridge.	II
Hunslet Mill; 53.78495°N 1.52375°W		1838–40	A former flax mill, it is in red brick with stone dressings, a brick parapet, and slate roofs with coped gables. There are two blocks forming an L-shaped plan. The east block has seven storeys and fronts of 25 and three bays. It contains string courses, a cornice, and corner pilaster strips. The south range consists of offices and a warehouse. It has three storeys, a three-bay entrance block with ten bays to the left and twelve to the right. The entrance block is rusticated with voussoirs, and contains a carriage entrance flanked by pedestrian entrances. Both blocks have five-sided stair towers.	II*
Temple Mill; 53.79026°N 1.55286°W		1838–43	A former flax mill, it is in brick on a cast iron frame, with the front in stone, and is in Egyptian style. There are two ranges, the earlier main range has one storey and a basement, and there is a two-storey range and engine house to the north. Facing the road is a screen wall that has 18 recessed columns with papyrus capitals and small windows between. The later office block has two storeys, and a central entrance with a moulded surround surmounted by a winged solar disc. Flanking it are six giant columns with lotus capitals. In front is a single-story screen wall with Egyptian motifs, behind are small-pane windows, and at the top is a deep coving carved with hieroglyphics and a winged sun.	I
Leeds Minster; 53.79523°N 1.53611°W		1839–41	The Minster, originally St Peter's Church, was designed by R. D. Chantrell. It is built in stone with a slate roof, and has a cruciform plan, consisting of a nave and chancel of equal length, both with clerestories and north and south aisles, an additional north aisle, a shallow apse on the chancel, a south transept, a tower in the middle of the north aisle, and a choir vestry added in 1901. The tower contains the main entrance on the north, clock faces, open battlements and crocketed pinnacles. Most of the windows contain Perpendicular tracery, the east window has five lights, and on the body of the church are crocketed pinnacles and turrets on the corners.	I
	1841	The boundary wall on the west side of the churchyard is in gritstone with gabled coping, it extends for about 65 metres (213 ft), and carries cast iron railings. The gateway has piers about 3 metres (9.8 ft) high with a square section, and each pier has a chamfered plinth, panelled sides, a cornice with quatrefoil panels, and two-tier pyramidal caps. Between them is a cast iron overthrow with a palmette motif, and scrolling at the sides of the lantern bracket.	II	
North wall, steps, gate piers, war memorial, and East Bar stone, Leeds Minster; 53.79538°N 1.53620°W		After 1841	The wall along the north boundary of the churchyard is in gritstone with triangular coping. Steps lead up to the north entrance to the churchyard, and the northwest entrance is flanked by gate piers, each on a chamfered plinth, panelled sides, a cornice with quatrefoil panels and two-tier-pyramidal caps. Set into the wall in 1921 is a war memorial designed by Edwin Lutyens in Portland stone. It consists of a tapering cross with a bench below and flanked by elaborate iron railings. There are inscriptions on the cross and on the wall. Also set into the wall to the east of the war memorial is a former boundary stone.	II
Gateway and east wall, Leeds Minster; 53.79525°N 1.53515°W		After 1841	The wall on the east side of the churchyard is in gritstone, and is about 1 metre (3 ft 3 in) high and 20 metres (66 ft) long. The gate piers, have chamfered plinths, and panelled sides.	II
Crown Point Bridge; 53.79369°N 1.53484°W		1843	The bridge carries Crown Point Road over the River Aire. The abutments and road walls are in stone, and the arch and parapet are in cast iron. The bridge has a single segmental span, there is lattice steel work in the spandrels, and the parapet railings have a herring-bone pattern. The abutments contain sunk panels with quatrefoil ornament, they are moulded at road level, and each has a pilaster with a lamp standard.	II
Gate Lodge, Temple Mill; 53.79041°N 1.55294°W		1843	The gate lodge is in Egyptian style. It is in stone and consists of a rectangular single-cell building with a blocked doorway. The corners and eaves are moulded, and the roof is flat. A short wall links it to a pylon-type shaft with recessed panels on the west side.	II*
Fitting-up shop, Globe Iron Foundry; 53.79294°N 1.55365°W		c. 1844	The building is in painted brick with paired eaves brackets, and a tile roof of three parallel gabled ranges. There are four storeys and five bays. The windows in the three upper floors have segmental heads, and in the ground floor are two wide entrances, one blocked, a five-light window, and a doorway on the right approached by steps.	II
Crane south of canal 53.79289°N 1.54926°W		c. 1845	The crane on the south side of the Leeds and Liverpool Canal was restored in about 1985 and moved to its present position in 1995. It is in cast iron with a wooden jib, and a gritstone counterbalance, and stands on a hexagonal plinth.	II
Gateway and walls, former railway foundry 53.78519°N 1.53602°W		1846–50 (probable)	The gateway consists of a wide basket arch in stone, with chamfered rustication, impost blocks, massive voussoirs, a moulded cornice, and an entablature. The flanking walls are in red brick, the whole extending for about 50 metres (160 ft), and containing segmental-arched blocked windows.	II
Former drying house, Victoria Flax Mill; 53.78491°N 1.52558°W		By 1847	The former mill building is in brick with a louvred slate roof. There are four storeys and fronts of nine and three bays. The south side of the ground floor is open, with round arches.	II
Bridge over Hol Back; 53.79174°N 1.55406°W		1849	The bridge gives access to Marshall's Mill. It is in cast iron and consists of a single flat span about 4 metres (13 ft) wide. On the sides of the span are the date, and the bridge has railings, and a pier on a plinth, with a recessed panel and a moulded cornice.	II
Basin, New Dock, Clarence Dock; 53.79187°N 1.53344°W		c. 1850	The dock basin was built by the Aire and Calder Navigation Company with a link to the River Aire. It is built in coursed squared gritstone blocks, and consists of a rectangular basin about 100 metres (330 ft) long and 50 metres (160 ft) wide.	II
Crane east of canal basin 53.79314°N 1.54927°W		Mid 19th century	The crane on the east side of the Leeds and Liverpool Canal Basin is in cast iron, and stands on a hexagonal concrete plinth.	II
Leeds Dam; 53.79339°N 1.53331°W		Mid 19th century (probable)	This consists of a stone weir across the River Aire. It is medieval in origin, and was rebuilt in the 19th century when it was bypassed by the Aire and Calder Navigation.	II
Stable, Thwaite Mill; 53.77652°N 1.50344°W		Mid 19th century	The former stable is in red brick with a roof of corrugated asbestos sheet, and is a rectangular building with a single storey. It contains a segmental-headed wagon entrance, a smaller door, and windows.	II
97 Water Lane; 53.79171°N 1.55130°W		c. 1857–77	A foundry workshop, later used for other purposes, it is in red-brown brick with decorative bands at the eaves, and a slate roof. There is one storey and seven bays. On the front facing the lane are tall round-arched windows, and in the left return is a round-arched doorway. On the front is an inscribed iron plaque.	II
Gate piers, Boyne Engineering Works; 53.78395°N 1.53893°W		1858	The gate piers are in cast iron, with a square section and pedimented capping, and are about 2.5 metres (8 ft 2 in) high. On the piers is a raised strapwork pattern with circles and quatrefoils, lettering and the date.	II
Offices, Boyne Engineering Works; 53.78402°N 1.53921°W		1858	The office block is in red brick with a dentilled eaves cornice and a slate roof. There are two storeys and a symmetrical front of seven bays. The central doorway has pilasters, a round-headed fanlight with a keystone, an entablature, and a cornice. The windows have segmental heads, keystones and stone sills.	II
Tower and spire, St Mary's Church, Hunslet; 53.77776°N 1.52947°W		1862–64	The body of the church was rebuilt in 1975, retaining the original steeple. This is in stone and in Gothic Revival style. The tower has corner buttresses, a doorway with a pointed arch, a moulded surround, and a gabled hood mould with crockets and the date. Above is a three-light window, a clock face, two-light bell windows, and a cornice. It is surmounted by a broach spire with lucarnes.	II
Former Victoria Foundry; 53.79095°N 1.55200°W		1863	Part of a foundry that was later extended, and in 2001–04 converted into a media centre. It has a cast iron frame with brick infill, some vertical timber cladding, and a corrugated asbestos roof. The main front has three gables, the left in brick, the middle one glazed, and the right with timber cladding.	II
Entrance range and bollards, Victoria Flax Mill; 53.78489°N 1.52600°W		c. 1865	The offices and warehouse of the former mill are in red-brown brick on a rusticated stone plinth, with quoins, sill bands, a modillion eaves cornice, and a slate roof. There are three storeys and 15 bays. The building has a carriage arch with a quoined surround, voussoirs with vermiculated rustication, and a keystone. The ground floor windows are round-headed with keystones, the windows in the middle floor have segmental heads, and those in the top floor have flat heads. Against each side of the archway are cast iron bollards with ball finials.	II
16 Crown Point Road; 53.79111°N 1.53856°W		1863–66	A workers' house at the end of a terrace, it is in red brick on a plinth, with millstone grit dressings. There are two storeys, and the south front is symmetrical with three bays. In the centre is a porch that has columns each with a moulded base and a foliage capital, a lintel, and a cornice. In the north front are a doorway with a segmental head and a decorative keystone, and a canted bay window with a moulded cornice on consoles. The windows in both fronts have segmental heads.	II
37 Hunslet Road; 53.79105°N 1.53852°W	—	1863–72	A workers' house in a terrace, it is in red brick on a plinth, with millstone grit dressings, and a string course. There are two storeys and a basement, and two bays. Steps lead up to a doorway in the left bay that has pilasters, a frieze, and a dentilled and moulded cornice. To the right is a window that has a lintel with a decorated keystone.	II
39 Hunslet Road; 53.79100°N 1.53849°W		1863–72	A workers' house in a terrace in red brick on a plinth, with millstone grit dressings, and a string course. There are two storeys and a basement, and two bays. Steps lead up to a doorway in the left bay that has pilasters, a frieze, and a dentilled and moulded cornice. To the right is a window that has a lintel with a decorated keystone.	II
Boiler house chimney, Tower Works; 53.79269°N 1.55237°W		1864	The chimney, also known as the Verona Tower because its design is based on the Torre dei Lamberti in Verona, is in polychrome brick and has a square plan. Near the top of the chimney are arcades of three-light recesses on bracketed sills, and above is a deep bracketed cornice. The top stage is octagonal, and contains an arched panel on each face, again on bracketed sills.	II*
Entrance range, Tower Works; 53.79225°N 1.55233°W		1864–66	The entrance range is in stone and red brick, with a modillion cornice and a slate roof. There is one storey, basements and attics. The carriage entrance is in stone, and consists of a round arch with a rusticated surround and a keystone, flanked by paired pilasters, and surrounded by an entablature with a modillion cornice and a blocking course. On each side of the entrance are ranges with seven bays to the left and five to the right. The ranges are on a stone plinth and contain round-headed windows with moulded surrounds, arches of red and blue brick, and keystones, and in the attic are square windows. The entrance passage contains two round arched doorways and panelled gates with a metal openwork motif in the top middle panels. At the rear is a projecting one-storey office with a bow window.	II
18 Crown Point Road; 53.79117°N 1.53842°W		1866–72	A workers' house on a corner site, in red brick on a plinth with millstone grit dressings. There are two storeys and a basement, and an L-shaped plan, with a north front of two bays, three bays on the east front, and a rounded corner between. On the north front is a canted bay window with a moulded cornice on consoles, and a porch with Tuscan columns, a frieze, and a moulded cornice on consoles. In the centre of the east front is a segmental-headed doorway and a round-headed stair window with a keystone and impost blocks. The windows in both fronts have segmental heads.	II
105 Water Lane; 53.79173°N 1.55240°W		1870	An office on a corner site, in painted brick with deep bracketed eaves, and a slate roof, hipped on the corner. There is one storey, a front of four bays, an angled bay on the corner, and one bay in the left return. On the front is an arcade of round-arched windows with an impost band, and there is a similar window in the left return. In the corner bay is a round-arched doorway with an ornately decorated keystone incorporating the date.	II
Leeds Bridge; 53.79390°N 1.54181°W		1870–73	The bridge carries Bridge End over the River Aire, and consists of a single segmental arch. The arch is in wrought iron, it carries a steel plate deck, and the fascia is in cast iron. In the spandrels is scrolled motif decoration, the parapet has interlocking circles and a moulded rail, and in the centre is the Leeds coat of arms. The abutments are in rusticated stone.	II
Bridge House; 53.79304°N 1.54115°W		c. 1875	Shops and an office block on a triangular island site, it is in moulded brick with stone dressings, with decorative bands between the floors, a deep dentilled cornice over the top floor, and an ornate pierced parapet. There are five storeys, and in the ground floor are shop fronts divided by pilasters. The entrances on the corners have fluted pilasters with Corinthian capitals. The windows have segmental heads; on the west front are four windows in the first floor and eight in the upper floors, and on the east front there are six windows in the first floor and nine above.	II
	1876	An industrial building on a corner site, converted into flats in about 1985, it is in red brick with sill bands, stone dressings, and a slate roof. There are four storeys and a basement, ten bays on Crown Point Road, six on The Calls, and a curved bay on the corner. The doorway in the corner bay has a round arch containing lettering, carved impost blocks and a keystone. On The Calls front is an arched yard entrance with rusticated voussoirs and a keystone carved with a horse's head. The ground floor windows in The Calls have segmental heads, otherwise they have round heads, triple in the first and second floor, and single in the top floor. In the courtyard is a circular tower with ornate cast iron cresting.	II	
Hunslet Engine Company offices 53.78381°N 1.53775°W		1880 (or later)	The office building is in red brick with stone dressings, a sill band, deep eaves brackets, and a hipped slate roof. There are two storeys and seven bays. The doorway has a stone surround, a small-pane fanlight, an entablature, and a cornice with lettering. Most of the windows are narrow, those in the ground floor with keystones, and there are two circular windows.	II
41 Hunslet Road; 53.79095°N 1.53847°W	—	1870s–1880s	A workers' house at the end of a terrace, in red brick with millstone grit dressings. There are two storeys and a basement, two bays, and a rear extension. Steps lead up to the doorway in the left bay that has a moulded surround and a segmental arch with a keystone. To the right is a canted bay window, and in the upper floor are segmental-headed windows with keystones.	II
Former Cooke's Printers; 53.78892°N 1.53677°W		1881	The former printworks, which were rebuilt following a fire in 1894, are in red brick, with dressings in stone and terracotta, modillion eaves brackets, and a hipped slate roof. There are three storeys and fronts of 30 and eight bays. The right corner bay is splayed, and contains an entrance with a round arch, pilasters, and an ornamented broken segmental pediment with initials in the tympanum. On the top of the bay is a square clock tower with corner pilasters, a dentilled cornice, and a dome with a finial. Along the sides of the building are moulded string courses, and in the ground floor are alternate segmental-headed windows, and projecting bays with pedimented gabled canopies over small semicircular-headed windows. In the middle floor is an arcade of elliptical arches with heads of alternate brick and stone, and pilasters with dentilled imposts, and the top floor contains two-light round-headed windows with columns between.	II
The Adelphi Public House; 53.79338°N 1.54104°W		1897–98	The public house is on a curved corner site, and is in red brick, with polished granite cladding on the ground floor, stone dressings, a parapet, and a slate roof. There are three storeys and attics, and ten bays, curved on the corner. The main doorway on Hunslet Road has paired attached columns and a segmental pediment, and on Dock Road is a window with a pediment and a smaller round-arched doorway to its left. The ground floor windows have segmental heads, those in the middle floor have flat heads and a lettered frieze above. In the top floor the windows have two or three lights with segmental heads and keystones, and in the attic are ornate dormers.	II
Former engine house, Tower Works; 53.79282°N 1.55286°W		1899	The engine house, later used for other purposes, is in red brick and has coped gables. At the east end is a round-arched window with the lower part converted into a loading door, and a doorway to the right. The west end contains a round-arched recess, and on the north front are two shallow buttresses. The interior is tiled and contains ten plaster portrait medallions by Alfred Drury.	II
Giotto Tower, Tower Works; 53.79250°N 1.55294°W		1899	A dust extraction tower, its design based on Giotto's Campanile in Florence, it is built in polychrome brick, moulded terracotta, and faience. The tower has a square section, octagonal corner shafts, and four stages divided by string courses. In the top stage there is in each front an arched recess containing three panels of gilded tiles, above which is a corbel table and a deep panelled cornice, surmounted by cast iron framework and a pinnacle.	II*
Former New Inn; 53.77488°N 1.54539°W		c. 1900	The former public house is in white faience with a parapet, raised in the centre, and a hipped slate roof, gabled at the rear. There are two storeys and three bays, and a single-storey half-bay on the left. The central doorway has an elliptical arch, pilasters, a fanlight, and an entablature with a segmental pediment containing carving, and the flanking windows have elliptical heads. The window above the doorway is in a round-arched recess and has a segmental head, a keystone, carved spandrels, and an open pediment on consoles, and the outer bays contain oriel windows with pediments. Flanking the windows are paired pilasters carrying a dentilled cornice, and a segmental pediment containing a cartouche. In the left return are two canted bay windows in the upper floor and ball finials.	II
Former Holbeck Public Library; 53.78698°N 1.55303°W		1901	The former library on a corner site is in brick faced in terracotta, with a balustraded parapet, and a slate roof. There are two storeys and a basement, and an irregular plan including a central tower with an octagonal hipped roof. On the corner is a large bowed bay flanked by canted turret-like bays. The entrance porch has a segmental pediment on consoles above which is the Leeds coat of arms. The windows vary, some with mullions, some with transoms, and others with round arches.	II
Former Police Station and Public Library; 53.78102°N 1.54468°W		1901–03	A police station and public library, later used for other purposes, on a corner site, the ground floor is in stone, the upper floor is mainly in red brick with stone dressings, and the roof is slated. There are two storeys, attics and a basement, the library has nine bays along Dewsbury Road, and the police station is curved around the corner. The main library entrance has an architrave, a cornice, and a segmental pediment, above which is a carved plaque, paired windows with Ionic pilasters, and at the top is a segmental pediment containing a scrolled plaque. To the sides are smaller entrances with cornices, and to the right is an arched carriage entrance with a keystone. The entrance to the police station is in the curved corner bay, and it has paired attached Ionic columns and a modillion cornice, and above is a three-light window and a balustraded parapet. The flanking bays contain a Venetian window in the upper floor under a gable. The other windows are tall and rectangular in the ground floor, and sashes in the upper floor. In the attic are dormers, and at the south end is a turret with a dome and a finial.	II
Church of the Holy Spirit, Beeston Hill; 53.77490°N 1.55244°W		1903	The church is in stone with a slate roof, and is in Gothic Revival style. It consists of a nave and a chancel under one roof, north and south aisles, and a tower base at the northeast. At the west end are two two-light windows with square hood moulds, the windows along the sides of the church have four lights, and the east window has seven lights with a niche containing a statue above.	II
The Garden Gate Public House; 53.78052°N 1.52794°W		1903	The public house has a front of brick, terracotta and glazed tiles, with a moulded eaves cornice, parapets on the returns, and a hipped grey slate roof. Thee are two storeys and an attic, and a front of three bays. The central doorway has a semicircular fanlight, it is flanked by elliptically-arched windows, all with decorative surrounds, and above is a lettered band. In the centre of the upper floor is an oriel window flanked by windows, all with round arches, architraves and keystones. On the corners are pilasters, and at the top is a swagged frieze. The interior is ornately decorated.	II*
Braime Pressings Limited; 53.78765°N 1.53406°W		1911–13	A pressed steel works in red brick and terracotta with slate roofs, and steel-framed workshops with glazed roofs. The entrance block has three storeys and a clerestory, and five bays. The central round-arched doorway has columns with floral motifs, and an open segmental pediment containing a cartouche. The windows are round-arched, and in the middle of the top floor is a clock. Flanking the entrance block are two-storey blocks, larger on the right, and behind are a machine shop, an office block, and workshops.	II
Boiler house chimney, Tower Works; 53.79268°N 1.55236°W		1919–20	The chimney is in red brick, it is tall and square, and has dentilled eaves.	II
Beeston Hill War Memorial; 53.77483°N 1.55270°W		1920s (probable)	The war memorial is in the churchyard of the Church of the Holy Spirit, and is in limestone. It consists of a tall cross fleury with an octagonal shaft on a tapering pedestal. This stands on a two-stepped tapered base on a two-stepped plinth. On the pedestal are panels with scrolled decoration, the panel on the front with an inscription.	II
War Memorial, Hunslet; 53.78099°N 1.54432°W		1920s (probable)	The war memorial is near a road junction, and is in Portland stone. It consists of a Celtic cross on a tall octagonal shaft, on an octagonal base, on a square plinth. On the plinth is an inscription, and on the eight faces of the base are the names of the members of St Peter's church and parish who were lost in the First World War.	II

== See also ==
- Listed buildings in Leeds (City and Hunslet Ward - northern area)
