= Viaduct Gardens =

Park in Leeds, England

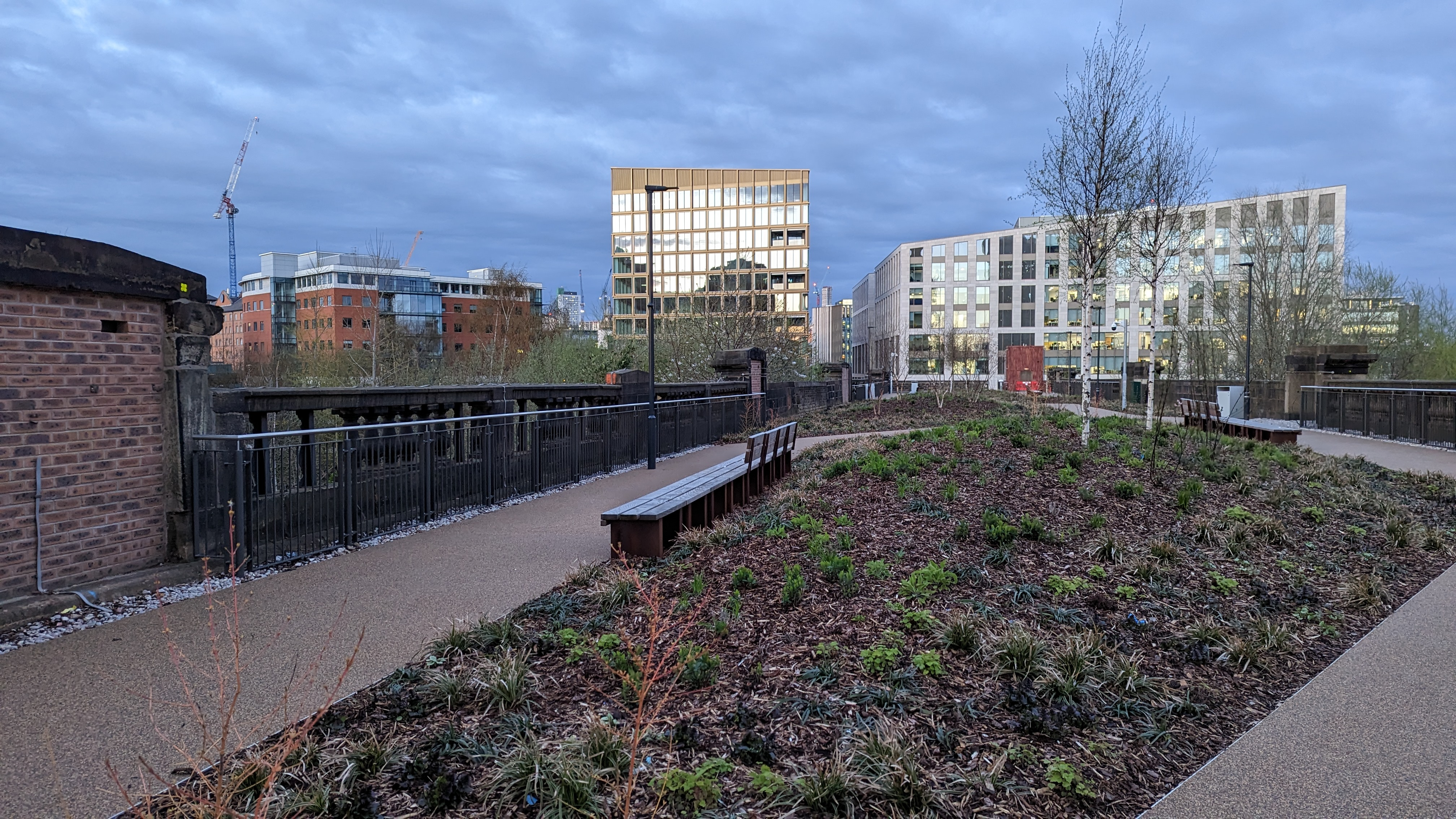
- Garden during planting in 2023
- Interactive map of Viaduct Gardens
- Type: Elevated urban linear park; public park
- Location: Leeds, West Yorkshire
- Coordinates: 53.7943°N 1.5595°W
- Created: 2023
- Status: Grade II listed

The Viaduct Gardens, initially marketed as the Viaduct Urban Garden, is an elevated park and garden in Leeds, England. The garden or park is located on top of the Grade II listed viaduct called Monk Bridge Viaduct, which is also sometimes used when referring to the gardens.

The park was completed in 2023, after it was converted from a disused railway viaduct. In 2024, it was shortlisted for Architects' Journal's annual award in the Landscape and Public Realm category.

== Background ==
The Monk Bridge Viaduct on which the park is located was opened in 1884, providing the approach to the new Leeds Central railway station. British Rail opted to close two of Leeds’ three main railway stations in 1961 and concentrated all passenger traffic in Leeds railway station. Leeds Central was then demolished, eventually becoming the business district and public square, Wellington Place.

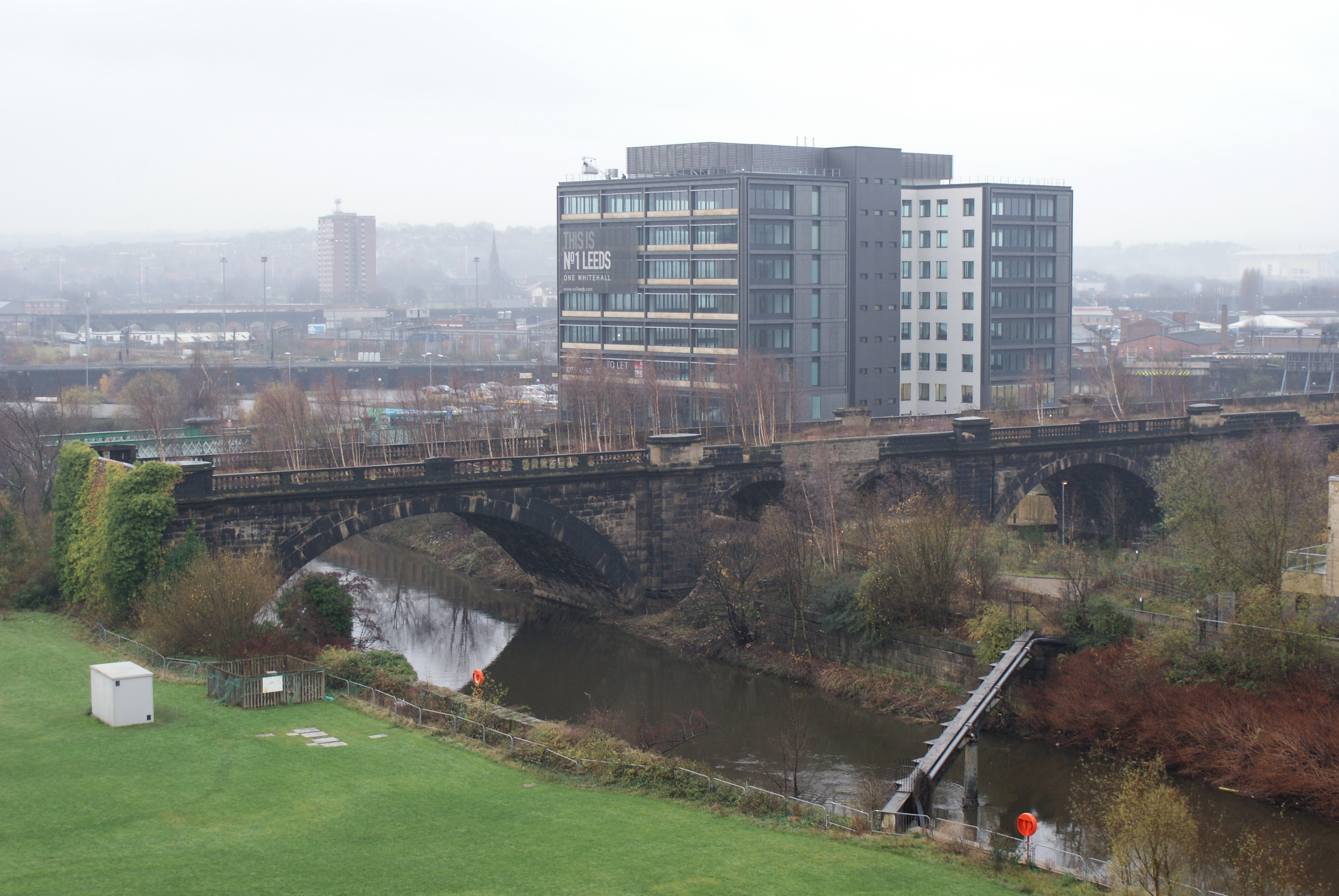
The disused Monk Bridge Viaduct in 2011

The viaduct was partly demolished, leaving around 200 meters of what would have been around half a kilometre long when the station was in use. Leeds's south is dotted with railway viaducts, both in use and abandoned. Following completion of New York City's High Line, a greenway was suggested on another viaduct, but construction is yet to start on that project. Meanwhile, a nearby developer purchased the much shorter Monk Bridge Viaduct, which has now become the Viaduct Urban Garden.

The design of the new Viaduct Garden was carried out by Ares Landscape Architects, alongside the adjacent residential development, The Junction.

Work on converting the viaduct began in 2022 and the first phase of the park opened in 2023, when it became the first elevated park in the county of Yorkshire.

== Location ==
The garden is accessed to the west of Wellington Place, a public square in Leeds' west end. A new stairwell and lift were constructed on the end of the viaduct for access. Other access points are likely to be available in the future as nearby developments reach completion.

The Viaduct Gardens aren't to be confused with the Holbeck Viaduct Project, which is a much longer viaduct where proposals for over a decade have suggested the creation of a greenway running over a mile in length.

The old railway station was located a few hundred meters from the current viaduct park as you look towards central Leeds, with the viaduct serving as the main entrance and exit to the terminus railway station.
