= Taylor, Wordsworth and Co =

Taylor Wordsworth and Co was one of the leading producers of machinery for the flax, wool and worsted industries in Leeds, Yorkshire during the British Industrial Revolution. It was established in 1812 and survived until it was taken over in the 1930s.

== Early years ==
The company was established in 1812, by Joseph Taylor, Joshua Wordsworth and Nathaniel Marshall. They had previously been employed by the brothers, Joseph and William Drabble, as workmen at a machine-making factory, Midland Mills, in Water Lane, Leeds. Midland Mills had originally been built for John Jubb, probably the same as the John Jubb who had married a Sarah Drabble in Doncaster in 1774. On 7 November 1812 a notice in the local paper, the Leeds Mercury, announced that ‘Messrs Taylor, Wordsworth and Marshall, Flax Tow and Worsted Machine-Makers (late Workmen to Mr William Drabble) … have engaged a Commodious Place in Holbeck, where they intend carrying on the above business in all its branches’. On 19 December 1812 the Mercury reported that William Drabble had been declared bankrupt, and advertised all his factory machinery and household furniture for sale by auction. In May 1813 his premises in Water Lane - a factory three stories high, a warehouse and a building used as a saw pit - were up for sale. In June 1814, ‘Messrs Taylor, Wordsworth and Marshall’ placed an announcement in the Mercury, announcing that they were moving into the Drabbles’ former premises and advertising for workers.

Taylor and Wordsworth both married Drabble girls – Wordsworth had married a Martha Drabble in Tankersley, near Barnsley, in 1803 while Taylor had married a Hannah Drabble in Leeds in 1805; then, following the death of the first Martha in 1810, Wordsworth had married another Martha Drabble in Leeds in 1811.

The early 1800s were an important time for the company. The industrialisation of the cotton industry had begun in the eighteenth century, but in the cloth industry it was only just getting under way. Most cloth was still produced in the workers' own homes. Most machinery was still made of wood, and was hand-operated and clumsy. While Taylor's marriage entry from 1805 gave his occupation as ‘Mechanic’, Wordsworth's, from 1811, showed him as ‘Carpenter’. It was the advent of steam power that would transform the prospects of machine makers such as Taylor and Wordsworth.

== Growth ==
Nathaniel Marshall left the partnership in 1816. One year later, a local Directory gave the firm's name simply as Taylor and Wordsworth, and described it as ‘flax, woolen and worsted machine makers and manufacturers of patent axle trees’. The same Directory for 1822 for the first time called the firm ‘Taylor Wordsworth and Co’, and added ‘and brass founders’ to the list of its activities; and in 1826, ‘brass and iron founders’. At some point the firm branched out into spinning: the Mercury of 19 May 1821 recorded that it had been awarded a prize at a dinner in London for 'spinning the best 6 gross of worsted yarn of British Merino wool. But this seems to have been short-lived; later trade directories make no mention of spinning. Another partner in the firm, Benjamin Mallinson, left in 1824. The notice of his departure refers to worsted spinning; so it may be that this was Mallinson's trade, which the firm was not continuing.

Holbeck been a country area outside Leeds - 'a detached village chiefly inhabited by clothiers, with an interval of many pleasant fields planted about with tall poplars, by which it was separated from the town'. Land records for the period 1819-1824 show Taylor and Wordsworth buying up farming land; some was bought from a cattle dealer, other plots had names such as ‘Ox Close’, ‘Parson's Close’ or were described as ‘arable meadows and pasture ground’.

Although Joseph Taylor appears always to have been the senior partner, he is a shadowy figure, with few records surviving to show how he contributed to the firm's success. Joshua Wordsworth appears to have been the engineering part of the partnership. He was granted a string of patents for improvements to machinery for spinning, and for heckling and dressing flax. By 1831, Taylor Wordsworth and Co employed about 100 householders, described as the ‘highest class of mechanics’. They also produced machines to the designs of other inventors: in a court case in January 1836, Joshua Wordsworth noted that Taylor Wordsworth and Co had made ‘a great many of Mr Kay’s machines; I suppose some hundreds’, and they were also known to produce woolcombs in conjunction with Samuel Lister of Manningham, Bradford. The firm had a ready market for their machinery on their doorstep, in the shape of Marshall's Mill, owned by the leading industrialist, John Marshall, who went on to build another big flax mill, Temple Works in Holbeck in 1836. The two firms appear to have become close, to the point where, by August 1844, they organised a joint ‘away weekend’ in Liverpool for their workers, a prospect which caused even the editor of the normally liberal Leeds Mercury some concern:

"Entirely approving of excursions for the working class, and with the kindest feelings towards the workmen of Messrs Marshall and Messrs Taylor and Wordsworth, we would express our earnest hope that the Sunday spent in Liverpool may not in any respect be spent in a manner unbecoming the day, and that every prudential care will be exercised to keep the younger hands under the guardianship of the more experienced, so that no moral harm may result from an excursion calculated otherwise to be so agreeable and improving. There are many excellent men among the above bodies of workmen, and great responsibility will rest upon them for the issue of this new and somewhat doubtful experiment, of a large body of people being away from home on the Sabbath, and on two whole nights."

Taylor Wordsworth and Co was, inevitably, caught up in the tensions caused by the rapid pace of economic and social change. Chartism had led frustrated and desperate workers into violence. The Chartist newspaper, Northern Star, of 20 August 1842 described a protest in Water Lane in Holbeck:

‘About five o'clock on Wednesday afternoon, a large body of people marched down Meadow-lane road from Holbeck, and effected an entrance into Messrs. Marshall's mills. They stopped the engines at Messrs. Benyon's mill, and all the hands turned out with apparent universal exultation … they proceeded to the shops of Messrs. Maclea and Marsh, where a number entered by the watch-house door, and opened the large gates. Immediately the yard was filled, the engine stopped, the bell rung, and as the men were turning out, the mob began to leave the yard. At this instant, Mr. Read, chief-constable, rode into the yard amongst them; he was quickly dismounted, but beat off the mob with his stick.

A general rush was made to the gates, and when the greater part had effected their exit, a large body of police arrived, and closed the gates, thus securing a number of prisoners. The people seeing only a few policemen, made an attack upon them with sticks, bludgeons, and stones, but were eventually compelled to fall back without again getting possession of the yard. The volley of stones poured upon the police was terrific for a short time … About four o'clock the riot act was read, and two pieces of artillery were paraded into Holbeck. Between thirty and forty prisoners were taken …’

This was the end of Chartist activity in Leeds. As the Northern Star put it:

‘…Leeds is just as tranquil as though no Strike had ever been, and as though no ‘yeos’, ‘blues’ or bayonetteers had been imported...The bells ring and the shops open, and mill tyranny goes on, and those who have any employment go to it, and those who have none starve quietly and patiently in the streets...’.

But the economic situation remained difficult for the manufacturers too. The Leeds Mercury in the late 1830s and early 1840s carried many public notices of auctions of the equipment of bankrupt firms, which showed that they had been using – and so were now dumping on the second-hand market – machinery made by Taylor Wordsworth and Co, among others. Wordsworth was one of six machine-makers who were reported by the Mercury to have gone to London in February 1843, to the Board of Trade, to ask Lord Ripon for the law to be changed to allow the export of English-made flax and tow machines – in view of ‘the depressed state of the trade in that important branch of manufacturing industry’. This was a complete turn-around in the manufacturers' position; in January 1827 Taylor Wordsworth and Co had joined many other Leeds manufacturers in publicly lobbying against a planned Bill to legalise the export of machinery, noting that 'great Danger may accrue to the Manufacturing Interests of the Kingdom if such Bill passed into a Law'. Times were hard. A 'calamitous fire' at the company's works in February 1844 didn't help; but the firm had invested in a Leeds Waterworks Company 'Fire Plug' (an early sort of hydrant, located in the factory), which averted complete disaster and which the company warmly recommended to others in the newspaper's account. Joshua Wordsworth had been appointed a director of the Leeds Waterworks Company in 1841.

In parallel, many manufacturers, including Joshua Wordsworth, were pressing for the repeal of the Corn Laws, to allow the import of cheap foreign grain which would lower the price of bread and permit them to cut wages. The Mercury reported in detail on their pro-Repeal activities. In February 1839 it recorded that the workers of Taylor Wordsworth and Co had subscribed £3 to support the Leeds Anti-Corn Law Association; in January 1846 it recorded that Leeds had contributed over £9000 to the ‘Quarter of a Million League Fund’, in support of repeal; Taylor, Wordsworth and Co had contributed £100 (around £5000 in today's money). When Repeal finally came, in June 1846, the management of Taylor Wordsworth and Co organised a celebration, reported by the Leeds Mercury:

‘In Leeds, as soon as the intelligence arrived, a salute of 21 guns was fired at the establishment of Messrs Kitson, Thompson and Hewitson, engineers, Hunslet-lane, and all the men immediately turned out and gave three hearty cheers in expression of their joy. Cannon were also fired at several other establishments up to a late hour last night; and at two o’clock the bells of the Parish Church struck up a merry peal. Messrs Taylor, Wordsworth and Co, machine makers, Holbeck, had a large loaf, an indication of the poor man’s loaf, and a flag with the inscription “Free Traders of Holbeck,” exhibited on the top of their works. They also had a large number of cannon firing during the day; and all their workmen are, we are informed, to have a dinner to-day, at two o’clock, previous to which cannon will again be fired’.

The company's prosperity enabled its two founders to develop other interests. A short biography of Joseph Taylor recorded that he was a ‘munificent benefactor’ to the causes of religion, education and public charities. Joshua Wordsworth, responding to the public enthusiasm for hydropathy, or hydrotherapy, bought a cold water bath, St Magnus Well, in Harrogate, which he developed by building a large lodging house and bathing rooms. He was also a founding investor in, and later a Director of, the Leeds and Thirsk Railway, which was to be built to join Leeds and Harrogate and link them to the GNER main line. And his Will shows that, in addition to many other legacies to his family and partners in Leeds, he also left the sum of £1500 to carry on the business of spinning yarns and manufacturing linens ‘at or near Barnsley … with my present partners’.

== The Deaths of the Founders, Take-over and Closure ==
Wordsworth died in 1846: an account of his funeral in the Leeds Mercury of 8 August 1846 noted that it was attended by a large procession of the workpeople of the firm, and that Wordsworth had been ‘a gentleman of great worth and generosity, and zealous in his attachment to Liberal politics’. Taylor died in 1848.

The company continued to prosper after its founders’ deaths. The 1851 census recorded 255 men and 109 boys working in the factory. In 1852, a notice in the London Gazette announced that Joshua Wordsworth's lawyer, James William Hamilton Richardson, was withdrawing from the partnership, leaving Joshua Taylor Wordsworth (1826-1895, Joshua Wordsworth's only surviving son) and two others, John Whitehead and John Pollard, to carry on the business. In 1856, Joshua Taylor Wordsworth also withdrew; the remaining partners were listed as John Whitehead, John Pollard, Thomas Whitehead, Benjamin Mallinson Pollard and Henry Walton Whitehead.

By 1888, the works are recorded as covering an area of over three acres. The account notes that:

‘…the premises consist of a number of substantial buildings, mostly four stories in height, and regularly grouped according to the branch of the machine-making department to which such building is allotted. The firm make every description of machinery that is used in the woolen, silk, and flax manufacturing, and in the dyeing and finishing trades, and they have been awarded several gold medals where their machines have been exhibited for the superiority and finish of the machinery’.

But in the 1930s Taylor, Wordsworth and Co was taken over by Platt Brothers. Production continued on the site for many years, but finally the works fell victim to Platts' “group rationalisation plans”. Closure was announced in May 1967, and much of the production was transferred to two other Platts works at Keighley. Midland Mills finally closed in 1981 – the last survivor of the Leeds textile industry. Some of the buildings, however, survive; and as part of the new Holbeck Urban Village project now enjoy protection and a new lease of life.
