= HUV =

HUV may refer to:

- Holbeck Urban Village, West Yorkshire, England
- Hypocomplementemic urticarial vasculitis syndrome
- San Mateo Del Mar Huave language, spoken in Mexico
