= Holbeck railway station =

Railway station in West Yorkshire, England

Holbeck
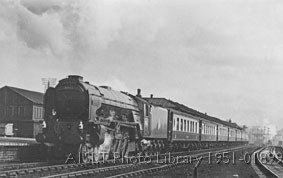
- Leeds-London passenger train passing Holbeck High Level in 1951

General information
- Location: Holbeck, City of Leeds; England
- Coordinates: 53.7932°N 1.5635°W
- Grid reference: SE288330

Other information
- Status: Disused

History
- Original company: Leeds, Bradford and Halifax Junction Railway
- Pre-grouping: Great Northern Railway
- Post-grouping: London and North Eastern Railway

Key dates
- 2 July 1855: High level platforms opened
- 1862: Low level platforms opened
- 7 July 1958: closed
Location

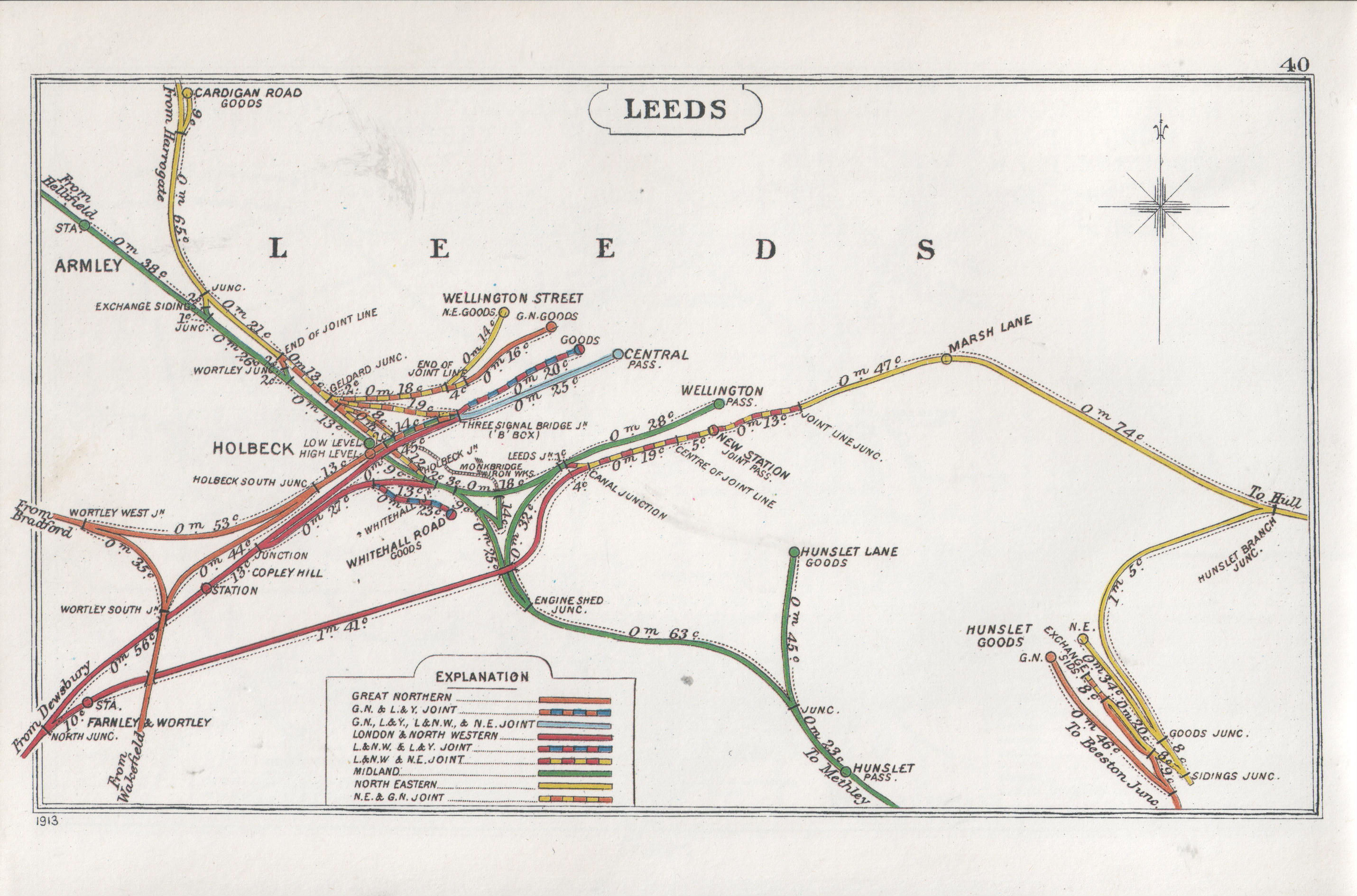
Railway Clearing House diagram of lines in Leeds in 1913. Holbeck station is shown in the middle left.

Holbeck railway station was a railway station that served the district of Holbeck, in Leeds, West Yorkshire, England.

== Overview ==
Holbeck Station was opened by the Leeds, Bradford and Halifax Junction Railway almost a year after the other stations were opened on the line. It was unusual in that it had platforms on two different levels, with Holbeck High Level (HL) being a joint Great Northern Railway and Lancashire and Yorkshire Railway venture and Holbeck Low Level (LL) which was a joint Midland and North Eastern Railway venture. The designations of High Level and Low Level were added by British Rail in 1951.

Holbeck was a cramped station and suffered from trains awaiting paths into the various Leeds termini after being held at junctions on the approaches to and from Leeds. Passengers on the Midland/NER lines would simply stay on the train and change to another at Wellington station. This accelerated the demise of Holbeck station well before the Beeching closures affected the other stations on the lines that it served.

The station was closed to the public in 1958. The route on which trains ran through Holbeck High Level station to Leeds Central station closed in 1967, with the tracks subsequently being lifted and the bridge carrying the high level track over the low level removed.

Trains running along the Airedale, Wharfedale and Harrogate lines still pass the site of Holbeck Low Level station on their way in and out of Leeds station, although there is no clear indication of the former station that existed there.

== Accidents and incidents ==
- On 27 July 1875, the boiler of a locomotive exploded.

Preceding station	Disused railways	Following station
Armley Moor or Beeston	Great Northern Railway	Leeds Central
Armley Canal Road	Midland Railway	Leeds Wellington or Leeds New

== See also ==
- Holbeck Viaduct Project
- List of closed railway lines in Great Britain
- List of closed railway stations in Britain
