= Monks Bridge =

Monks Bridge could refer to:

- Monks Bridge, River Dove in the English Midlands
- Monks' Bridge at Rushen Abbey, Isle of Man
- The Monk's Bridge at Calder Abbey, Cumbria
- Monk Bridge in York
- Monk Bridge Viaduct Garden, an elevated park in Leeds, England
