= Midland Mills, Leeds =

Former flax mill in Leeds, England

Coordinates: 53.7906°N 1.5560°W

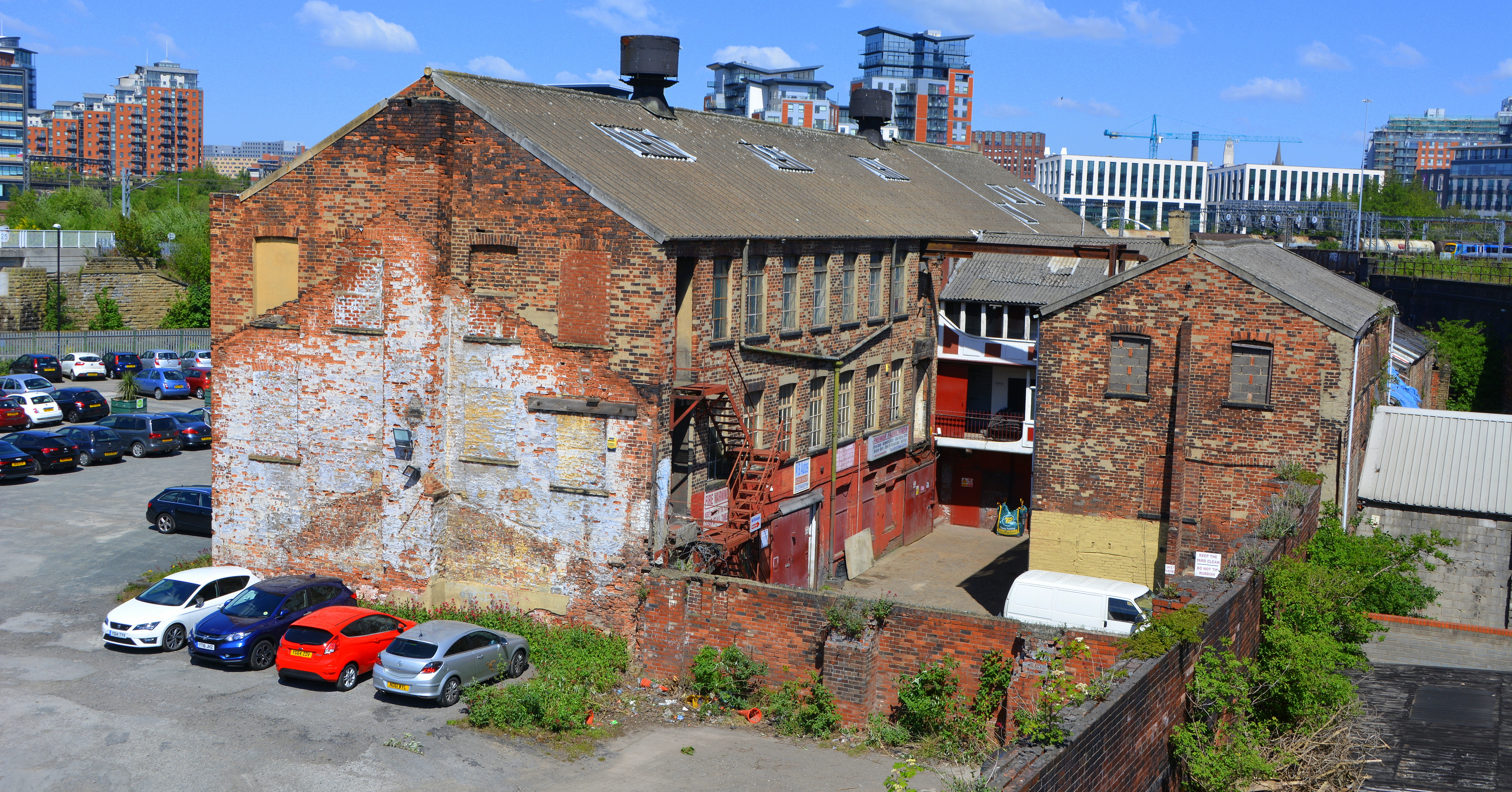
Buildings of Midland Mills (2017)

Midland Mills is a former flax mill on Silver Street in Holbeck, Leeds, West Yorkshire, England, in the Holbeck Urban Village regeneration area. Since the 1980s it has been used for light industrial work.

== History ==
John Jubb built the first mill on the site in 1793 but sold his business and mill in the early 19th century. The new owner took advantage of the expansion of the flax spinning industry in the Holbeck area by diversifying into the manufacture of textile machinery. This machinery was sold to local and national mills, including the mills of Leeds entrepreneur Benjamin Gott. The mills changed ownership a few years later when the owners moved to premises on Meadow Lane, selling the Midland Mills site to the Drabble Brothers who were in the employment of John Marshall at the same time as Matthew Murray. Drabble Brothers continued to manufacture textile machinery and also patented designs for cart axles until a disagreement between the two brothers saw their firm go bankrupt in 1812.

Taylor and Wordsworth, two employees of the Drabble brothers, bought the site in 1812 and established Taylor, Wordsworth and Co. By the early 1850s both Taylor and Wordsworth had died but the company continued to trade under the same name but under new management. In the 1930s Platts bought the factory, Platts soon became the largest textile machine-makers in the world, employing over 15,000 people. Unfortunately the economic turbulence of the 1980s caused recession and the decline of manufacturing in the UK. The factory ceased trading in 1981 and Platts followed in 1982. The closure of Midland Mills marked the end of the textile industry in Leeds.

== Present ==
Since 1981 Midland Mills has been divided into industrial units. Most of these have been used for light industrial work. Midland Mills is situated in the Holbeck Urban Village regeneration area.
