= Thomas Walker (Yorkshire cricketer) =

English cricketer

Thomas Walker (3 April 1854 – 28 August 1925) was an English first-class cricketer, who played in fourteen matches for Yorkshire County Cricket Club between 1879 and 1880.

Born in Holbeck, Leeds, Yorkshire, England, Walker was a right-hand batsman, who scored 189 runs in twenty four first-class innings, at an average of 8.59. Walker's highest score was 30, and he took three catches in the field.

Wilson died in August 1925, in Roundhay, Leeds, aged 71.
