= Thwaite Mills =

Former mill in Leeds, West Yorkshire, England

Coordinates: 53.7762°N 1.5040°W

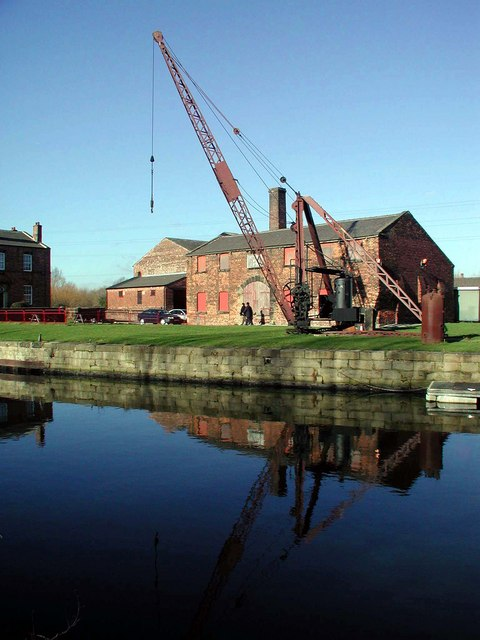
Thwaite Mills

Thwaite Mills or Thwaite Watermill is an industrial heritage site in Leeds, West Yorkshire, England, on the River Aire and the Aire and Calder Navigation. It is a fully restored working water-powered mill built in 1823–25, harnessing the power of the river, and has been called "one of the best last remaining examples of a water-powered mill in Britain". The mill, the manager's house and three associated buildings are all grade II listed buildings. The site was open to the public as a museum operated by Leeds City Council until 1 April 2024.

== History ==
The first known mill on the site was a fulling mill built in 1641, as part of the local industry of manufacturing woollen cloth. In 1823–25 the Aire and Calder Navigation company acquired the mill and redeveloped the site. Two new large waterwheels were built, and the site comprised the mill building, the manager's house, stables, workshop, warehouse and workers' cottages. The cottages were demolished in 1968, but the other buildings remain intact.

The mill was used for a range of purposes. The firm of W and E Joy used it to crush seeds for lubrication and lighting oil, and imported woods were crushed for the dyeing industry. The Horn family, who took over the mill in 1872, used it to crush flint and china stone for the pottery industry and to grind chalk to make "whiting" for industries ranging from pharmaceuticals to whitewash, then barytes for the paint industry, and until 1975 for the production of putty.

Set on an island between the River Aire and the Aire and Calder Navigation, the mill was as self-sufficient as its owners could make it. There were workshops, orchards, arable land and pasture, and the mill did not have an electricity supply until 1986, instead generating its own power from the two water wheels and a Marshall engine which was purchased to power the Raymond Mill in the 1930s.

In January 1975, the weir burst and the waterwheels stopped turning.

== Preservation and museum ==
The Thwaite Mills Society was formed by volunteers in 1976 to preserve and restore this important site, and received financial support from the then West Yorkshire County Council. It was a registered charity, and ceased to exist by 2012.

In 1978 six buildings on the site were given Grade II listed building status: the mill, the manager's house, the warehouse, office, and drying floor, the bridge over the mill stream, the machine shop, and the stable.

The river weir was rebuilt, and the museum opened in 1990. It was run by Leeds City Council in partnership with Yorkshire Water.

As well as the functioning waterwheels, the mill contained a collection of machinery used at various times. The manager's house had been restored to reflect life there in the 1940s, and was visited self-guided. The museum site included a steam crane from 1946 and wildlife areas. A variety of special events was held at the museum.

== Closure ==
Thwaite Mills was formerly leased by Leeds City Council who opened it to the public through Leeds Museums & Galleries until 1 April 2024. In February 2024 the council agreed to terminate its lease and close the museum, and the Canal & River Trust announced that they would not be able to continue operating the museum. In 2026, the site was sold by the Canal & River Trust to an Ilkley-based property developer.

== See also ==
- Listed buildings in Leeds (City and Hunslet Ward - southern area)
