= Holbeck =

Inner city area of Leeds, West Yorkshire, England

Coordinates: 53.789°N 1.555°W

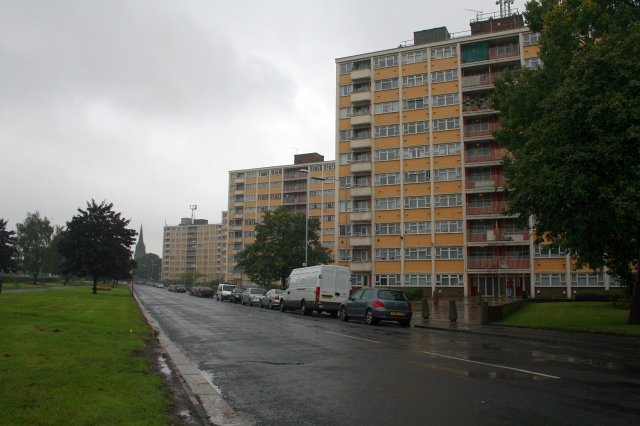
- Holbeck Moor road

- Location within West Yorkshire
- Population: 5,505
- OS grid reference: SE311314
- Metropolitan borough: City of Leeds
- Metropolitan county: West Yorkshire
- Region: Yorkshire and the Humber
- Country: England
- Sovereign state: United Kingdom
- Post town: LEEDS
- Postcode district: LS11
- Dialling code: 0113
- Police: West Yorkshire
- Fire: West Yorkshire
- Ambulance: Yorkshire
- UK Parliament: Leeds South

Holbeck is an inner city area of Leeds, West Yorkshire, England. It begins on the southern edge of Leeds city centre and mainly lies in the LS11 postcode district. The M1 and M621 motorways used to end/begin in Holbeck. Now the M621 is the only motorway that passes through the area since the end of the M1 moved to Hook Moor near Aberford. Since large parts of Holbeck have been vacated in preparation for the regeneration of the area, the district has in large parts suffered from a population exodus. Holbeck had a population of 5,505 in 2011. The district currently falls within the Beeston and Holbeck ward of Leeds City Council.

The Leeds and Liverpool Canal also runs through Holbeck.

== History ==
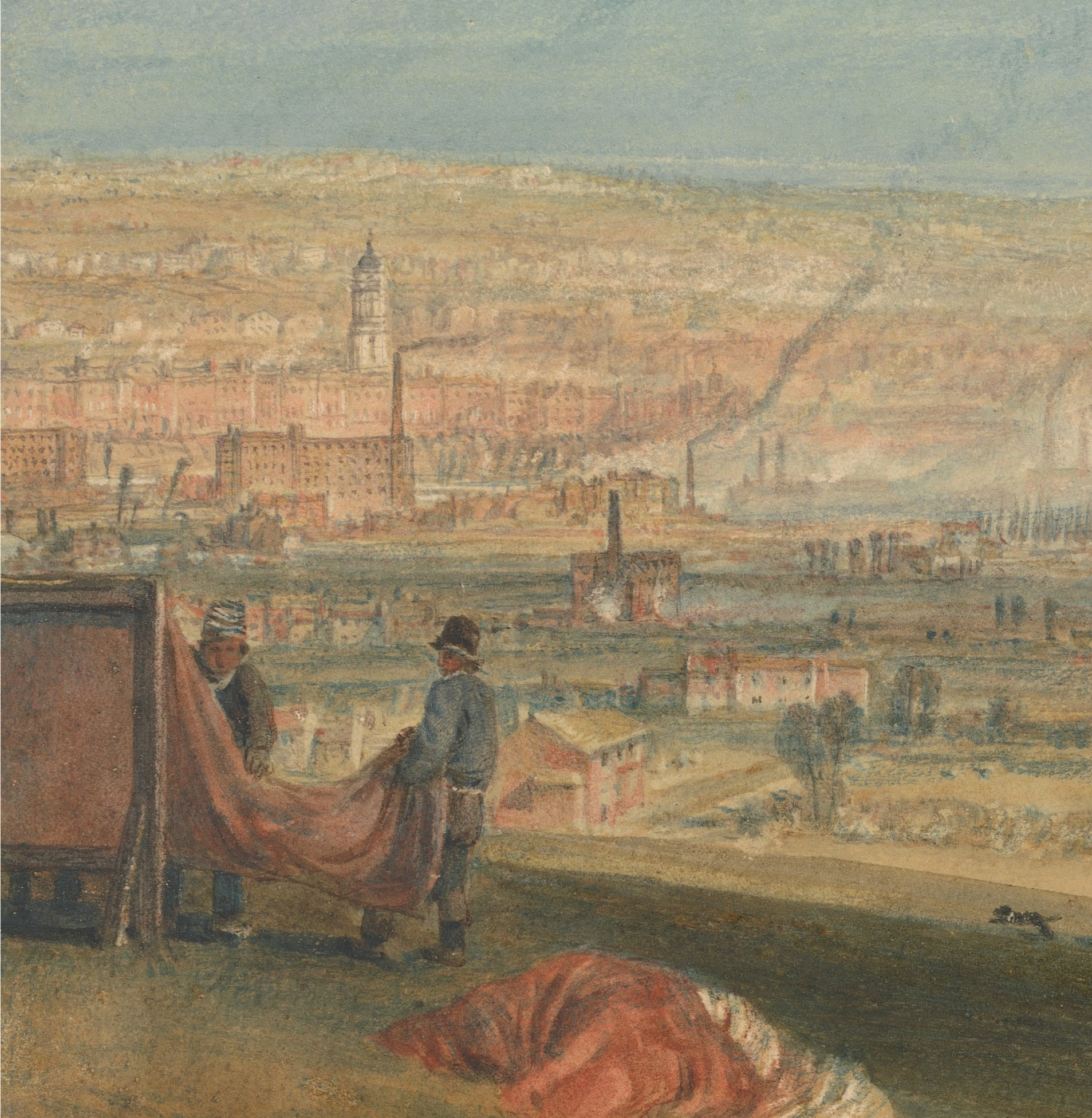
Detail of J. M. W. Turner's 1816 painting Leeds, showing Holbeck. Viewed looking northwards from Beeston Hill, the white tower belongs to St Paul's Church (demolished 1905) on the far side of the River Aire. Below the tower stands Marshall's Mill in Holbeck, and to its right, the chimney emitting black smoke, is Fenton and Murray's foundry. Below the foundry, with a black chimney, stands Holbeck Moor Mill. The two-storey building below and to the right of the mill is Holbeck Workhouse.

The boundaries of Holbeck, as described in Simon Bradley's paper.

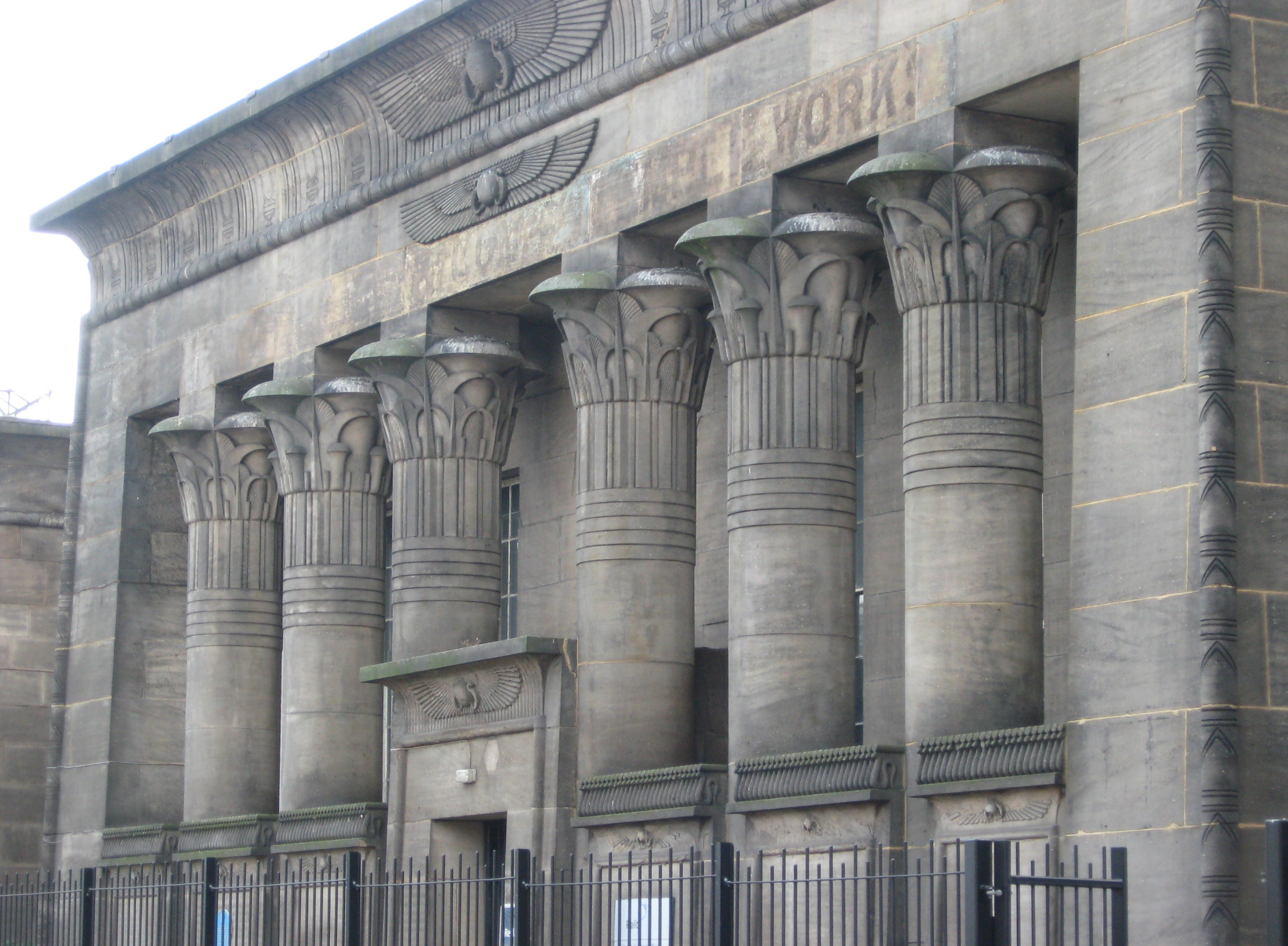
Temple Works

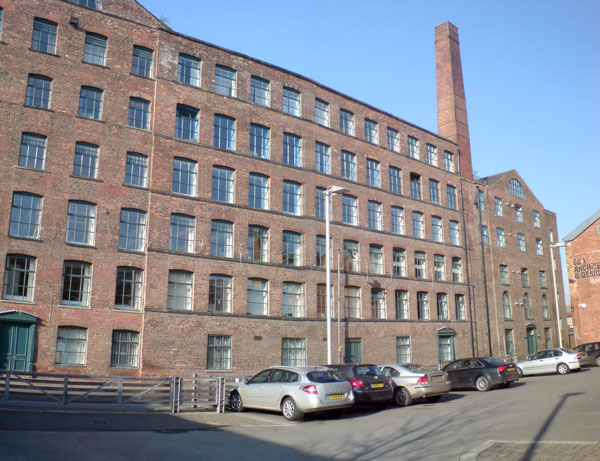
Marshall's Mill

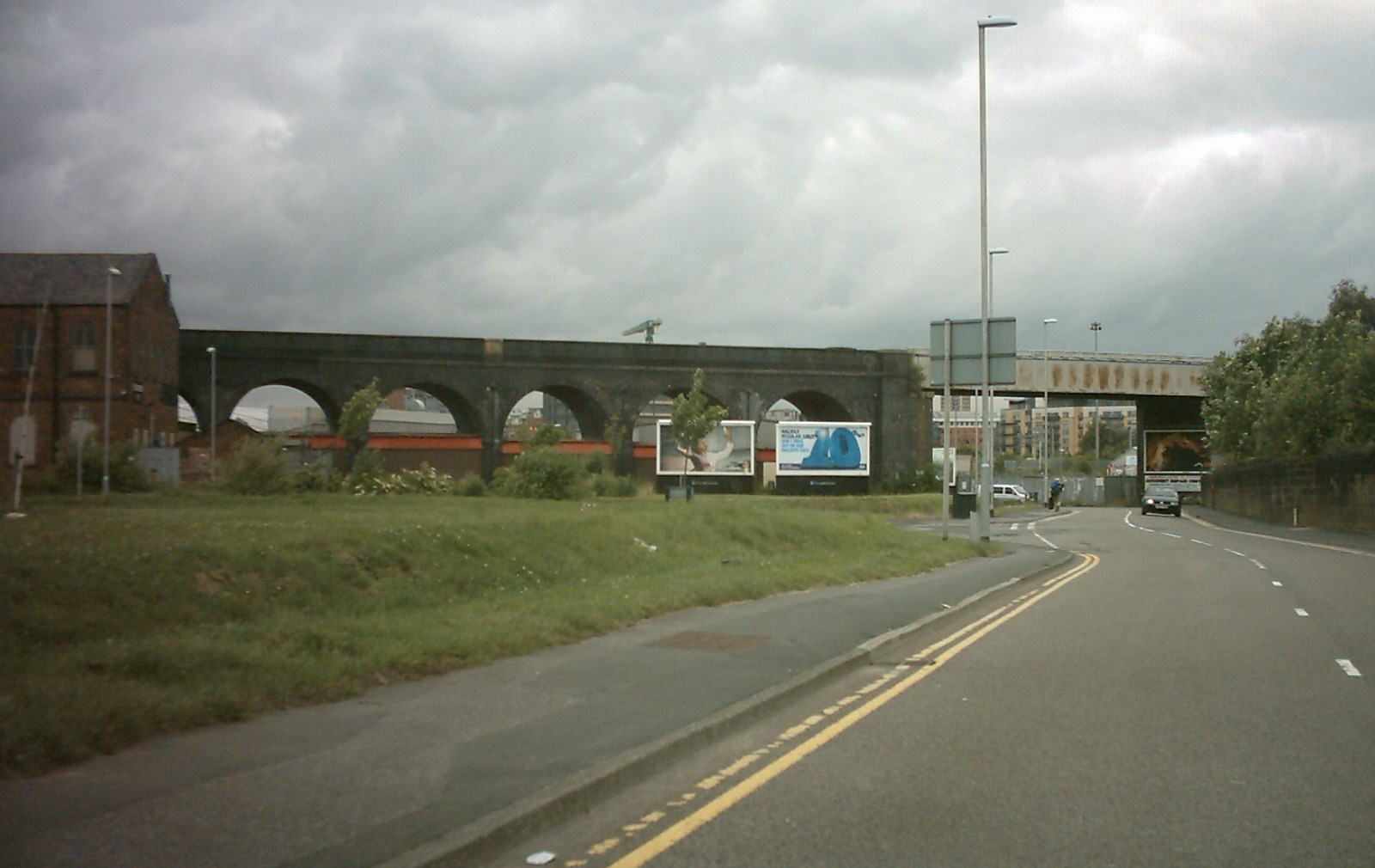
Holbeck Viaduct

=== Early history ===
The Hol Beck is the name of a stream running from the south-west into the River Aire. It was the deposition of silt by the Hol Beck and nearby the Sheepscar Beck from the north that led to a fording place and a small community which eventually grew into the town of Leeds.

The place-name Holbeck is first attested in the 12th century in forms such as Holebec and Holesbec, from hol 'a hollow' and beck 'a stream' (an Old Norse loanword, from bekkr, reflecting Scandinavian influence in Yorkshire during the Viking Age), thus 'stream in the hollow'. The old manor belonged to the priory of the Holy Trinity at York and after the Dissolution of the Monasteries passed to the Darcy and Ingram families.

In the 18th century Holbeck was still a village outside Leeds, and expanded with the development of hand weaving. At this time, Holbeck was known for its spa water, which resembled that of Harrogate, and was carried into Leeds for sale. The supply diminished when numerous wells were sunk to supply the mills and works in the area and the water, which previously rose to the surface, could only be obtained by pumping from a considerable depth.

=== 19th century ===
In the first half of the 19th century, Holbeck village was a hamlet of few streets. Most were owned by John Scholey (1774–1834) and are listed in his will at the Borthwick Institute for Archives, University of York. His family sold the properties at the beginning of the Industrial Revolution. It 'was still listed as a separate out-township as late as 1878, and was routinely cited without reference to Leeds'.

But as the area industrialised around the mid-19th century, it became increasingly integrated into Leeds. There were ironworks, works for the manufacture of steam engines and machinery of all kinds. Key factories were:

- John Marshall's Mill (begun 1791–92, spinning flax and thread). Marshall's Mill consisted of a spacious room lit by skylights, occupying an area of nearly two acres.
- Matthew Murray's Round Foundry on Water Lane (1795–97) was where the Middleton Railway's first steam locomotives were built.
- Starting in 1812, the factory in Silver Street belonging to Taylor, Wordsworth and Co, machine makers, eventually grew to cover three acres.
- Tower Works, a pin-factory built in 1864–66 by Colonel Thomas Harding, with two Italianate towers added 1899 (Giotto Tower) and 1919 (plain Tuscan).

In the mid-19th century Holbeck was one of the most densely populated suburbs of Leeds, described in 1834 as 'one of the most crowded, one of the most filthy, one of the most unpleasant, and one of the most unhealthy villages in the county of York'. Slum clearance took place after the cholera epidemics of 1832 and 1849. Holbeck railway station (now demolished) was built during the century. It was notable because it was a two-tier station with a low line and a high line; the railway viaduct, built in 1869, was thought to be one of the engineering marvels of the Victorian age. In 1877, the Holbeck Working Men's Club opened, one of the first in the country.

=== 20th century ===
Holbeck has suffered significant decline since the 19th century; in 1921, its population was around 38,152, but in 2010 was 4,470. Further slum clearance took place in the 1930s, and a workhouse, built by around 1870, was at this time converted into a hostel for the destitute, before being demolished in the 1970s and replaced with a school. Many of the industrial buildings and warehouses have been demolished or fallen into disrepair. Holbeck is nevertheless home to 33 listed buildings and many other important architectural structures. Some of the most notable of these are: The Dark Arches, the Hol Beck, Marshall's Mill, the Midland Mills, the Round Foundry, Temple Works, Tower Works and two railway roundhouses. The last active church in the area (until the recent establishment of new ones) was St. Matthew's, built in 1829–30 and deconsecrated in 1981.

The railway station has been demolished, but plans began to be developed in 2014 to convert the track bed (which is currently overgrown with trees and shrubs) into a raised walkway leading directly into Leeds city centre. In the 1960s, Leeds sought to become a 'motorway city', and 1972–75 saw the completion of the M621, which runs through Holbeck, and the A643, creating a new boundary on Holbeck's west side.

From 1956 to 2004 Kays Catalogues was the largest employer in Holbeck, acquiring Samuel Driver Ltd in 1956 and taking over Temple Works on Marshall Street, expanding the site in the 1950s and again in 1981. Part of the Kay's premises is a listed building.

=== Recent times ===
In 2003 Kays was bought by the Barclay Brothers, and within a year the Holbeck distribution centre had been closed down. The 1981 distribution centre was soon demolished, the 1952 building became derelict, and in December 2008 Temple Works suffered a structural failure.

In the 2020s, Holbeck, along with neighbouring Hunslet, was chosen as the site of a new town as part of the Leeds South Bank development. Development of the area is scheduled to be completed by 2029.

== Governance ==
Holbeck was formerly a township, in 1866 Holbeck became a civil parish, 1 April 1925 the parish was abolished and merged with Leeds. In 1921 the parish had a population of 38,152.

== Geography ==
The name Holbeck derives its name from the brook on which it is situated. Since industrialisation the beck, a natural watercourse, has been canalised with stone-set floor and stone walls. It is crossed by several bridges giving access from Water Lane. Holbeck is on the flood plain on the south side of the River Aire of which the Hol Beck is a tributary.

It covers an area of about 553 acres. According to Simon Bradley, writing in 2016,

The boundaries of Holbeck have moved over time, but my interviewees broadly agree on where it lies: bounded by Leeds City railway station and the River Aire to the North; the M621 to the south; the east perimeter follows Victoria Road, overlooked by Bridgewater Place (known locally as 'The Dalek'); the west is defined by the A643 feeder road joining the M621 to Armley Gyratory. For the interviewees, the north and south boundaries are more debatable than the east and west.

Confusingly, for example, Holbeck Cemetery, founded in the mid-1850s, is to the south of Holbeck, in Beeston.

== Regeneration ==
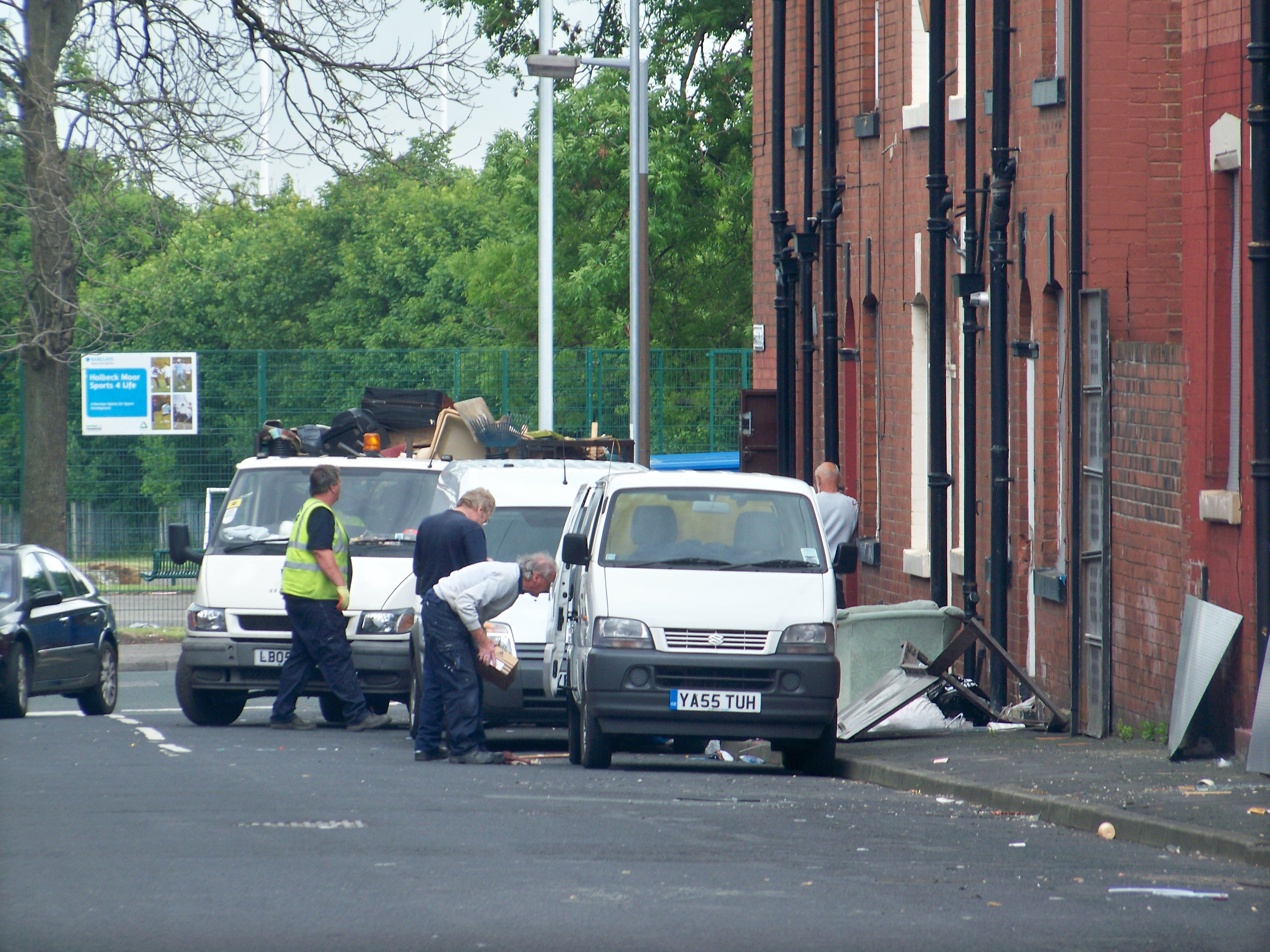
The clearance of Runswick Place in preparation for demolition

Over recent years efforts have been made to regenerate the Holbeck area. The most notable scheme is the Holbeck Urban Village, which is expected to attract investment of around £800 million and create around 5,000 jobs. However, the area surrounding the 'Village' is deprived and run down. From 2007, Leeds City Council began vacating the back-to-back housing and in 2010 began demolition.

The main area of demolition during the regeneration was the Jenkinson Estate. Many low-rise flat blocks were demolished and the remaining housing received new UPVC windows, new roofing & external covering. The land where the low-rise flat blocks were has been used for brand-new social housing including four-bedroom family homes to two-bedroom apartments.

Three rows of back-to-back terraced homes on Brown Lane-West and Top Moor Side have been demolished and made way for some more social housing, built by Keepmoat. In July 2017, residents had noticed some of the council-owned back-to-back terraced homes are being renovated with new windows and roofing.

== Landmarks ==
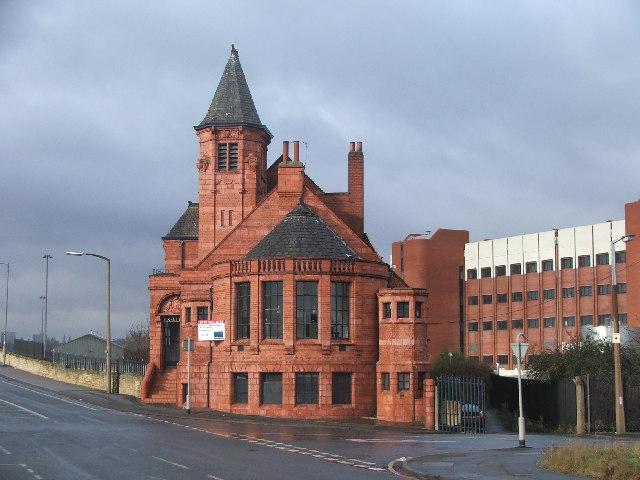
The Old Library, Holbeck.

Holbeck Conservation Area includes several industrial archaeological sites and Listed buildings. Holbeck is unique in Leeds as an area where many early to mid 19th century industrial buildings survive in an unaltered group within the original street pattern. The buildings are utilitarian two or three-storey brick structures with some larger complexes such as Temple Mill and the brick terracotta towers of Tower Works. Railway viaducts cut through the area, notably that of the Leeds and Bradford Railway of 1846 and the London and North Western Railway's extension line of 1882. A proposed 120 feet (37 m) tall sculpture by Antony Gormley, Brick Man, to stand in the triangle between railway lines, was never commissioned, but a 1986 maquette can be seen in Leeds City Art Gallery.

Holbeck Public Library is built in red brick and terracotta. The 1877 Holbeck Working Men's Club is the oldest surviving working men's club in the UK.

== Religion ==
The old chapel, dedicated to St. Catherine and recorded in ancient documents as existing in 809, was rebuilt on the same site in the early 18th century. It became inadequate for the rapidly increasing population at that time and was demolished in 1836. The church of St. Matthew was built on common land next to the old burial-ground. It cost £3,786 and was a Commissioners' church built by the Parliamentary Commissioners and consecrated in 1832. It is built in the early English style. There were places of worship for Independents, Wesleyans and other denominations. Currently the groups that meet in Holbeck include the Holbeck Christian Fellowship and Mosaic Church, who meet in St. Matthew's Community Centre.

== Amenities ==
The area has lost amenities as part of the population exodus connected with the demolition of properties as part of the regeneration scheme. Kwik Save supermarket closed in 2005, leaving small independent convenience stores. The post office closed in 2008, but reopened in 2009. There is a bookmaker and several fast food takeaways.

== Managed approach to on-street prostitution ==
In 2014 Leeds Council in conjunction with West Yorkshire Police trialled a managed approach to prostitution which allowed for soliciting and purchasing of sex in a light industrial area in a bid to:

- reduce the problems caused by street prostitution to residents, and businesses which currently suffer from such nuisance;
- better engage with street sex workers to improve their safety and health, with a view to enabling them to exit this way of life
- reduce the prevalence of street sex working.

After a review in 2016 it was announced that this was to continue indefinitely. However, the managed zone policy was ended in March 2020 following a local public campaign. The activities there were featured in the 2016–17 BBC documentary series Sex, Drugs & Murder: Life in the Red Light Zone.

== Notable residents ==
- Stephen Scholey (1815–1878), settler of Australia.
- Henry Rowland Marsden (1823–1876), mayor of Leeds.
- John Scholey (1840–1908), businessman.
- Joseph Blackburn (1852–1922), cricketer.
- Thomas Walker (1854–1925), cricketer.
- Ted Peate (1855–1900), cricketer.
- David Eccles Nichols (1873–1962), violinist, born in Holbeck.
- Alexander Tom Cussons (1875–1951), industrialist.
- Frank Dennis (1907–2000), cricketer.
- Stan Brogden (1910–1981), athlete.
- Ivy Benson (1913–1993), bandleader.
- Hasib Hussain (1986–2005), terrorist.
- Vesta Victoria (1873–1951), music hall singer and comedian

== See also ==
- Listed buildings in Leeds (Beeston and Holbeck Ward)
- Holbeck Viaduct Project

== Documentaries and histories ==
- Where I Live – Holbeck BBC Leeds Mini Guides
- The ancient parish of Leeds: historical and genealogical information at GENUKI (Holbeck was in this parish).
- Ripples Out (Lippy People, 2009), a documentary about the area and its redevelopment, part 1, part 2, part 3, part 4, part 5, part 6, part 7, part 8, part 9, part 10, part 11.
- Blackshaw, Tony, Working-Class Life in Northern England, 1945–2010: The Pre-History and Afterlife of the Inbetweener Generation (Basingstoke: Palgrave Macmillan, 2013).
- Bradley, Simon (2016). Archaeology of the Voice: Exploring Oral History, Locative Media, Audio Walks, and Sound Art as Sitespecific Displacement Activities (PDF). University of Huddersfield: Unpublished PhD thesis. p. 31.
- Bradley, Simon and Phil Legard, Holbeck Audiowalk, http://www.holbeckaudiowalk.org/.
- Miller, K. (ed.), (1989), Another Line from Leeds: Memories are Made of This: With Special Reference to Holbeck 1914-1945. Leeds: Ingram Gardens Day Centre.
- Leach, Peter; Pevsner, Nikolaus (2009). The Buildings of England: Yorkshire West Riding, Leeds, Bradford and the North. New Haven and London: Yale University Press. ISBN 978-0-300-12665-5.
- Truelove, S. (ed.), (2000). ‘Swaps’ Holbeck. Glasshoughton.
