= Joseph Blackburn (cricketer) =

English cricketer

Joseph Scott Blackburn (24 September 1852 – 8 July 1922) was an English first-class cricketer. A right arm fast bowler and right-handed batsman, he played for Yorkshire, in six matches in 1876 and 1877. He also played a first-class game for the United North of England Eleven in 1876, and appeared for Hunslet and District in 1878.

Blackburn was born in Holbeck, Leeds, Yorkshire, England. He took 2 for 19 against Surrey and made his highest score, 28, against Middlesex. In all, he took eight first-class wickets at 27.25, and averaged 10.16 with the bat.

A wheelwright by trade, Blackburn was a useful defensive batsman, as well as being a fast bowler of note in the Leeds area. He was a member of the Batley Cricket Club team that won the Heavy Woollen Cup in 1894, and played for the club for several seasons. He appeared with success in matches against Yorkshire United in 1875 and 1876, and played for Leeds Clarence in 1877.

He died in 1922 in New Wortley.
