= Marshall's Mill =

Flax spinning mill in Holbeck, West Yorkshire, England

Coordinates: 53.7914°N 1.554°W

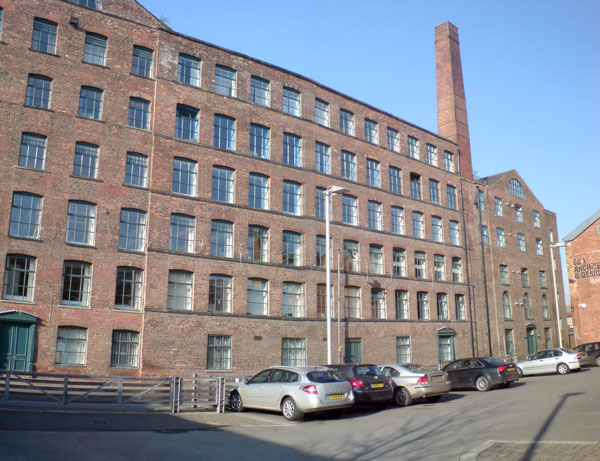

Flax
- Location: Holbeck, Leeds; Mill B, 1794; Mill C, 1815–16; Mill D, 1826–27; Mill E, 1829–31

Construction
- Built: 1791–92
- Decommissioned: after 1886
- Floor count: 6
- Main contractor: Marshall and Sons

Power
- Engine maker: Boulton & Watt

Equipment

Listed Building – Grade II*
- Official name: MARSHALL MILLS
- Designated: 9 March 1987
- Reference no.: 1375160

Listed Building – Grade II*
- Official name: FORMER FLAX WAREHOUSE TO MARSHALL MILLS
- Designated: 9 March 1987
- Reference no.: 1375161

Listed Building – Grade II
- Official name: BOUNDARY WALL OF MARSHALL MILLS WITH WORKSHOP AND RAILINGS.
- Designated: 11 September 1996
- Reference no.: 1256331

Marshall's Mill is a former flax spinning mill on Marshall Street in Holbeck, Leeds, West Yorkshire, England.

Marshall's Mill was part of a complex begun in 1791–92 by English industrial pioneer John Marshall. It was originally a four-storey mill, drawing water from the nearby Hol Beck. A Boulton & Watt steam engine was installed to assist water power. Rapid expansion followed with the addition of Mill 'B' (1794) adjacent to a warehouse built to service the original mill (all now demolished.)

It was to eventually supplant Yorkshire's previous cottage industry of hand driven spindles.

As the business continued to expand further mills, warehouses, engine houses, and reservoirs were added on the south side of Hol Beck. The six storey Mill 'C' was added in 1815–16, Mill 'D' followed in 1826–27, and Mill 'E' (which is aligned to the roadside and joined Mill 'C' to Mill 'D') in 1829–31.

Temple Mill, in the form of an Egyptian Temple, was built between 1838 and 1841. Later, the complex employed over 2,000 factory workers. When it was completed it was considered to be one of the largest factories in the world, with 7,000 steam-powered spindles. The addition of the Temple Mill completed development of mills by Marshall & Sons on this site. All of the mill buildings added from 1815 still exist.

In the early years, child labour was employed. In 1832 Marshall's political opponents alleged that:

'In Mr Marshall's mill, a boy of 9 years of age was stripped to the skin, bound to an iron pillar, and mercilessly beaten with straps, until he fainted.'

But other reports claim that Marshall treated his workers better than most factory owners: overseers were forbidden to use corporal punishment to control the workers, and Marshall installed fans and attempted to regulate the temperature of the mill. In 1844, Marshall and a neighbouring engineering firm, Taylor, Wordsworth and Co broke new ground by organising an away weekend in Liverpool for their workers, a novelty which caused even the editor of the normally liberal Leeds Mercury some concern:

'Entirely approving of excursions for the working class, and with the kindest feelings towards the workmen of Messrs Marshall and Messrs Taylor and Wordsworth, we would express our earnest hope that the Sunday spent in Liverpool may not in any respect be spent in a manner unbecoming the day ... There are many excellent men among the above bodies of workmen, and great responsibility will rest upon them for the issue of this new and somewhat doubtful experiment, of a large body of people being away from home on the Sabbath, and on two whole nights.'

Marshall & Sons ceased production in 1886. The site was taken over by other textile producers.

Marshall's Mill is now a grade II* listed building.

The site was comprehensively redeveloped in the late 1990s. It is now used as office space for several companies. There are plans to further redevelop the site as part of Holbeck Urban Village.

== See also ==
- Grade II* listed buildings in Leeds
- Listed buildings in Leeds (City and Hunslet Ward - southern area)
