= Sex, Drugs & Murder: Life in the Red Light Zone =

British documentary series

- Genre: Documentary
- Directed by: Nick Mattingly
- Country of origin: United Kingdom
- Original language: English
- No. of seasons: 1
- No. of episodes: 13

Production
- Executive producers: Caroline Short; Rob Unsworth
- Producer: Nick Mattingly
- Production locations: Leeds, England

Original release
- Release: July 12, 2016 – October 8, 2017

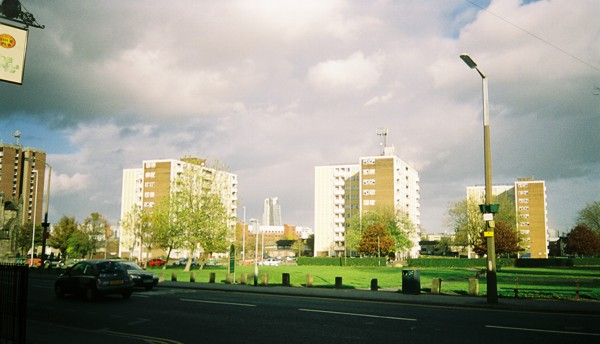
Holbeck in Leeds is the feature of the documentary

Sex, Drugs & Murder: Life in the Red Light Zone is a thirteen-part documentary series broadcast on BBC Three from 2016 to 2017. The series centres around prostitutes working in a tolerance zone in Holbeck, Leeds.

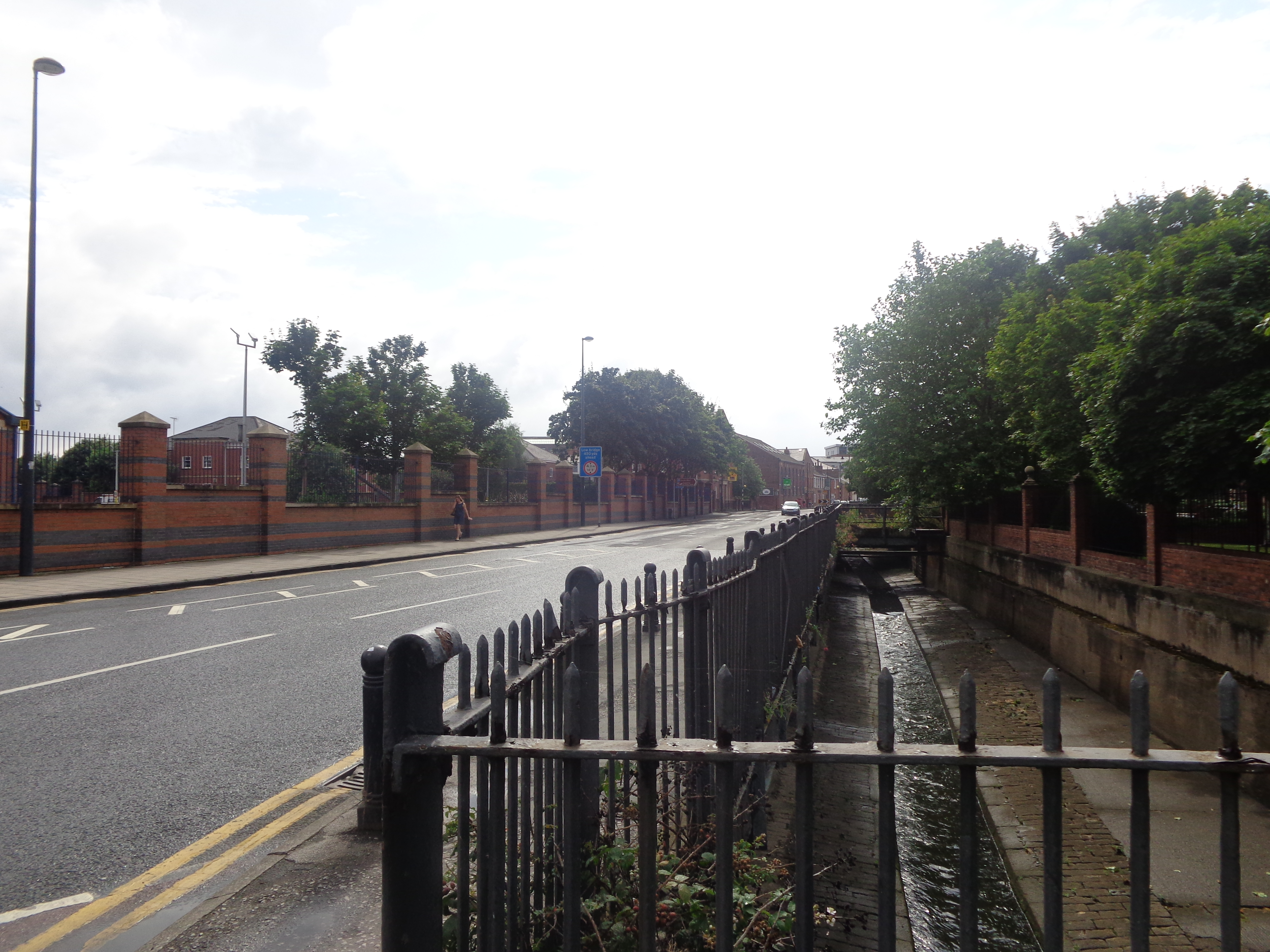
Water Lane in Holbeck is on the edge of the managed zone but is synonymous with prostitution.

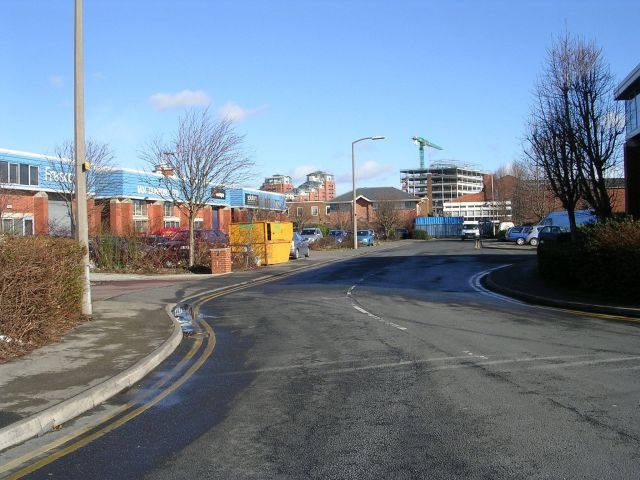
Springwell Court is at the centre of the managed zone.

On 1 October 2014 Leeds City Council and West Yorkshire Police enacted a managed zone in the North East of the city's Holbeck district. In recent years the city's main red light area had moved away from its traditional area around Spencer Place in Chapeltown towards Holbeck. The decision was made to contain it in non-residential areas of the district by agreeing not to prosecute sex workers trading within the designated area between the hours of 7pm and 7am. After a years trial the managed zone was made permanent. Two years following this the documentary was made exploring the United Kingdom's first managed red light district.

The programme focuses around the lives of several sex workers in Holbeck. As well as sex work the programme deals with issues such as drug addiction (in particular heroin), domestic violence, family relations and parent-child separation, housing and eviction, shoplifting, imprisonment and the effects of child sexual abuse.

== Subjects ==
- Sammie Jo — A heroin addict with a £120 a day addiction, having been sexually abused as a child and in abusive relationships.
- Kayleigh — A heroin addict since 16 who has been a sex worker for 12 years whose relation with non-addict parents and brother is central to her portrayal.
- Adele — A drug addict with two children she is no longer in contact with aged 3 and 4. She has been working in the red light district for 13 years, since she was 16.
- Bee — Having been a sex worker for 8– 10 years, Bee has been shown to have a friendly relationship with many of the other sex workers in the red light district, including Sammie Jo, Adele and Amy. She has worked in both Leeds and Doncaster.
- Amy- A drug addict who throughout the show constantly moved houses and ended up in frequent relationships.
- Stacey and Corrin
- Ceri
- Mel
- Debbie

== Awards ==
In November 2017, Sex, Drugs & Murder: Life In The Red Light Zone won the Royal Television Society (North West) Award for Best Factual Series.

== Criticism ==
The programme was criticised by the English Collection of Prostitutes for only showing 'darker' areas of the industry such as drug addiction.

== See also ==
- Prostitution in the United Kingdom
