= Leeds Central railway station =

Disused railway station in West Yorkshire, England

Leeds Central
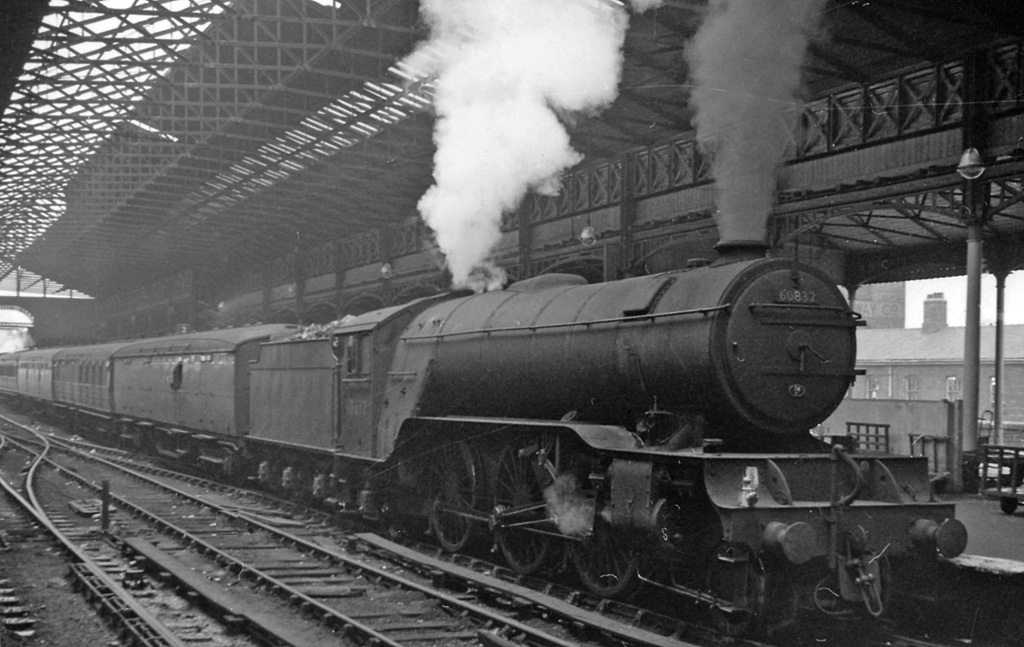
- Leeds Central Station in 1961.

General information
- Location: Leeds, City of Leeds; England
- Coordinates: 53.795785°N 1.554704°W
- Grid reference: SE294333
- Platforms: 8

Other information
- Status: Disused

History
- Original company: London and North Western Railway; Lancashire and Yorkshire Railway; Great Northern Railway; North Eastern Railway
- Pre-grouping: London and North Western Railway; Lancashire and Yorkshire Railway; Great Northern Railway; North Eastern Railway
- Post-grouping: London, Midland and Scottish Railway; London and North Eastern Railway

Key dates
- 18 September 1854: Opened
- 1 May 1967: Closed
Location

Leeds Central Railway Station Act 1848
- Act of Parliament
- Parliament of the United Kingdom
- Long title: An Act for making a Railway Station on the North Side of the River Aire in Leeds in the West Riding of the county of York, to be called "The Leeds Central Railway Station."
- Citation: 11 & 12 Vict. c. lxxi

Dates
- Royal assent: 22 July 1848

Text of statute as originally enacted

Leeds Central railway station was a terminus railway station in Leeds, West Yorkshire, England. It was opened in 1854 as a joint station between the London and North Western Railway, the Lancashire and Yorkshire Railway, the Great Northern Railway and the North Eastern Railway. It replaced the cramped LNWR terminus at Wellington Street, which had opened in 1848 with the line to Dewsbury. It closed in 1967, when its services were moved to Leeds City to consolidate all of Leeds train services in one station.

The last train left from Leeds Central on 29 April 1967. This was a Saturday and as there was no Sunday service, the station closed on 1 May 1967. The last train was an early evening service to Harrogate filled by the usual Birmingham RC&W DMU. Detonators were placed on the track by railway staff which exploded as the train rolled away from the platform and past the signal box on its final departure.

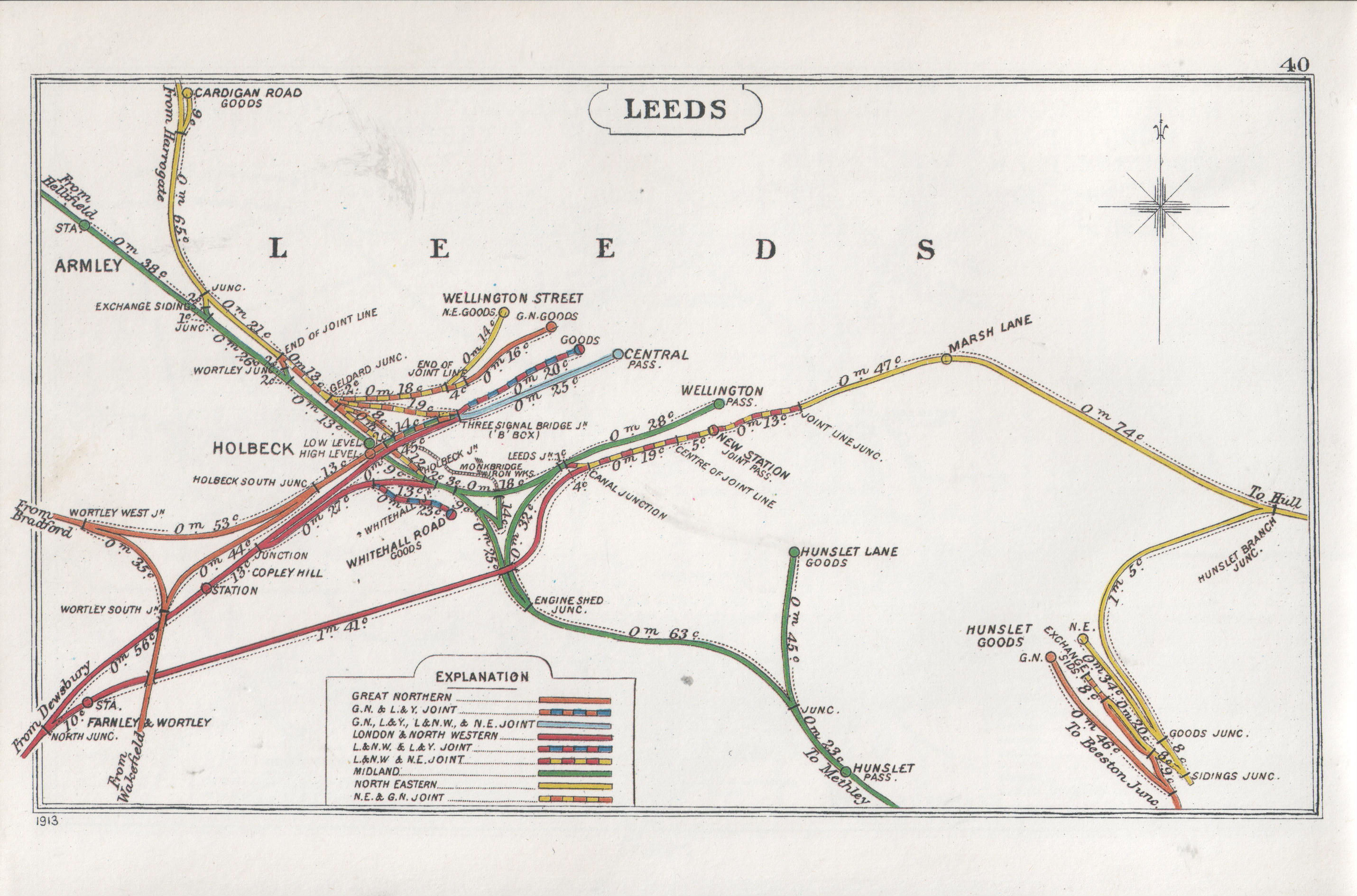
Railway Clearing House diagram of Leeds in 1913. Leeds Central station is shown in light blue.

The station was not architecturally distinguished and was built above street level. After closure, part of the station site became a Royal Mail sorting office, later partially redeveloped as the West Point residential development; the remaining half of the former sorting office site was to have been used for Lumiere, a 170-metre (560 ft) high skyscraper, but eventually became the site of the Central Square office development. A goods lift and a viaduct that approached the station remain extant.

== Services ==
| Preceding station | Disused railways | Following station |
|---|---|---|
| Headingley; Line closed, station open | North Eastern Railway; Leeds and Thirsk Railway | Terminus |
| Holbeck High Level; Line and station closed | Great Northern Railway; Bradford, Wakefield and Leeds Railway | Terminus |
| Holbeck High Level; Line and station closed | Lancashire and Yorkshire Railway; Bradford, Wakefield and Leeds Railway | Terminus |
| Copley Hill; Line and station closed | Lancashire and Yorkshire Railway; Leeds, Dewsbury and Manchester Railway | Terminus |
| Copley Hill; Line and station closed | London and North Western Railway; Leeds, Dewsbury and Manchester Railway | Terminus |
