= Tower Works =

Factory building in Leeds, West Yorkshire, England

Coordinates: 53.793°N 1.553°W

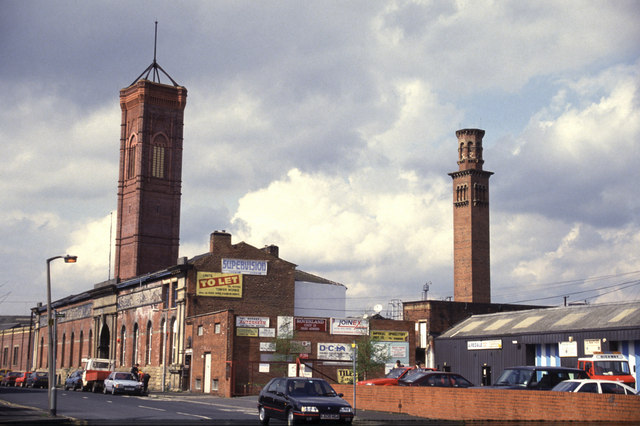
- 1993 image showing two of the three towers
- Architectural style: Italian
- Location: Holbeck, Leeds

Construction
- Built: 1864–1866
- Completed: 1919
- Decommissioned: 1981
- Main contractor: T. R. Harding; Harding, Rhodes & Co.

Design team
- Architect: Thomas Shaw (1864)
- Other designers: William Bakewell (1899)

Equipment

Listed Building – Grade II

Tower Works is a former factory notable for its three listed towers. It is located on Globe Road in Holbeck, Leeds, West Yorkshire, next to the Leeds and Liverpool Canal. The Italianate towers of the factory are a distinctive landmark on the Leeds skyline.

The factory was founded by T. R. Harding to make steel pins for carding and combing in the textile industry, and the original buildings, by Thomas Shaw, were erected in 1864–66. Harding's son, Colonel Thomas Walter Harding, employed William Bakewell to extend the works in 1899. The design of the extension was heavily influenced by Harding's love of Italian architecture and art.

The most notable features of Tower Works are the three towers that give it its name and served for dust extraction from the factory. The largest and most ornate tower (1899, by Bakewell) is based on Giotto's Campanile in Florence. The smaller ornate tower (1866, by Shaw) known as Verona tower or Boiler House Chimney is styled after the Torre dei Lamberti in Verona. A third plain tower, built as part of Harding's final phase of expansion in 1919, is thought to represent a Tuscan tower house such as can be seen in San Gimignano. All three towers are listed structures, the two ornate towers being Grade II* and the plain tower Grade II.

The design for the Giotto Tower included ventilation systems that were way ahead of their time in terms of minimising pollution from the steel works. The chimney incorporated a filter to remove the excess steel dust.

In 1895 T. W. Harding & Son amalgamated with two other companies to become Harding, Rhodes & Co.

The factory sustained damage in the Second World War when neighbouring buildings were bombed during the air raids on the nearby Leeds railway station. It closed in 1981 after 117 years of operating on the site.

== Present ==
Tower Works lies at the heart of the Holbeck Urban Village renovation area, it was acquired by Yorkshire Forward in 2005. A masterplan for the site was drawn up by Yorkshire Forward, ISIS Waterside Regeneration and Bauman Lyons Architects for an exemplar sustainable mixed use development. The development agreement between Yorkshire Forward and ISIS fell through and Yorkshire Forward developed the first phase. With the winding up of the regional development agencies, ownership passed to the Homes and Communities Agency who oversaw the completion of the entrance range to provide accommodation for digital and creative companies. In 2014 a new developer was sought to develop the rest of the site.

=== Public Art Programme ===
In 2008 three artist projects were commissioned by MAAP, as responses to the Tower Works site. The artists involved included Lee Patterson and Martin Smith. Black Dogs, a local artist collective, also contributed to the project.
