= Holbeck Viaduct Project =

Former railway viaduct in Leeds, England

Coordinates: 53°47′17″N 1°33′44″W

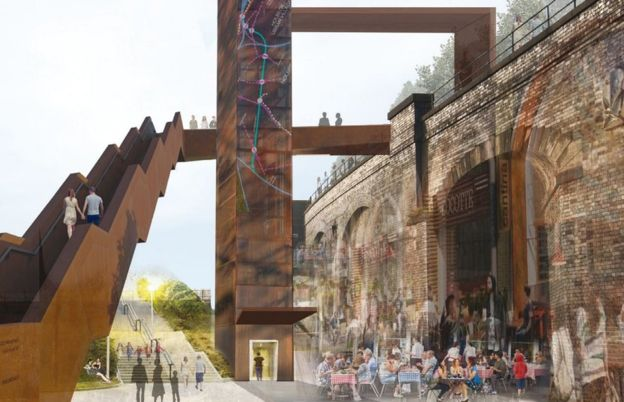
A visualisation of the Holbeck Viaduct Project once developed

The Holbeck Viaduct Project is a community project that proposes bringing the Holbeck Viaduct in Leeds, England back into public use. The project is supported by a community group of the same name.

The Holbeck Viaduct (also known as the Farnley Viaduct) spans 92 archways and 1.1 miles (1.7 km). It runs from Leeds railway station, via Holbeck Urban Village and Old Holbeck, passes near Elland Road Stadium and ends onto wasteland in Wortley.

The viaduct was built in 1882 for the London and North Western Railway during the Industrial Revolution. It has been described as a feat of Victorian engineering, and provided a vital transport link into the booming city centre, which by the turn of the 20th century had developed into an important centre for the production of woollen cloth (See History of Leeds). The viaduct largely fell out of use in the 1960s following Leeds City Station modernisation, and the last scheduled train to pass over the viaduct did so on 11 October 1987.

A number of uses for the viaduct have been suggested, including a community garden, green walkway, arts space, park, cycle path, events hub, public allotment, café, music venue, viewing platform, local landmark or other community-focused project.

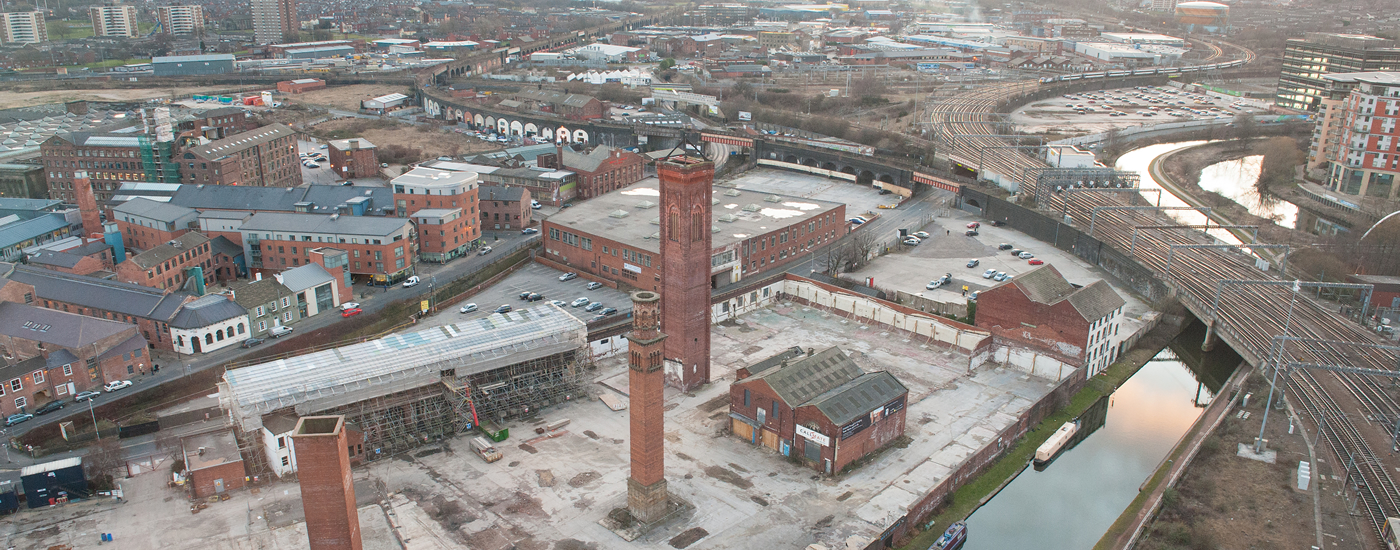
Holbeck Viaduct (centre, curved viaduct) in Holbeck, Leeds

The Holbeck Viaduct Project community group envisages that the viaduct will open in 2023. The proposed timeline for the development is:

- 2016–2017: Pre-feasibility scoping report
- 2017–2018: Detailed feasibility and stakeholder engagement
- 2018–2020: Fundraising and securing land and planning
- 2021–2023: Constructing, planting and opening.

The project is happening at the same time as the South Bank Leeds regeneration, which has the aim of doubling the size of Leeds city centre.

The community group supporting the project seeks to develop the project in a highly participatory manner, drawing on the time, skills and resources of a wide range of people and organisations. The group has a website and mailing list, and is represented on Twitter and Facebook. The group is seeking new volunteers and supporters to support their community-based proposals, including detailed feasibility study to underpin future fundraising.

The project has previously been referred to as the Holbeck High Line, echoing the High Line in New York. However, the name Holbeck Viaduct Project reflects a wider range of options and a desire to create an affordable project which truly reflects Leeds and its local communities.

The Holbeck Viaduct Project is not to be confused with the nearby Monk Bridge Viaduct development, in nearby Whitehall Road, which will see a separate viaduct turned into a sky park, alongside bars, restaurants and apartments.

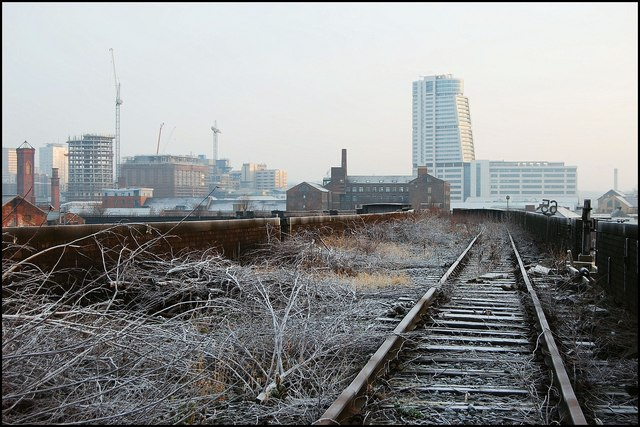
The Holbeck Viaduct in 2009
