= Holbeck Urban Village =

Area of Holbeck, Leeds, England

Coordinates: 53°47′29″N 1°33′13″W

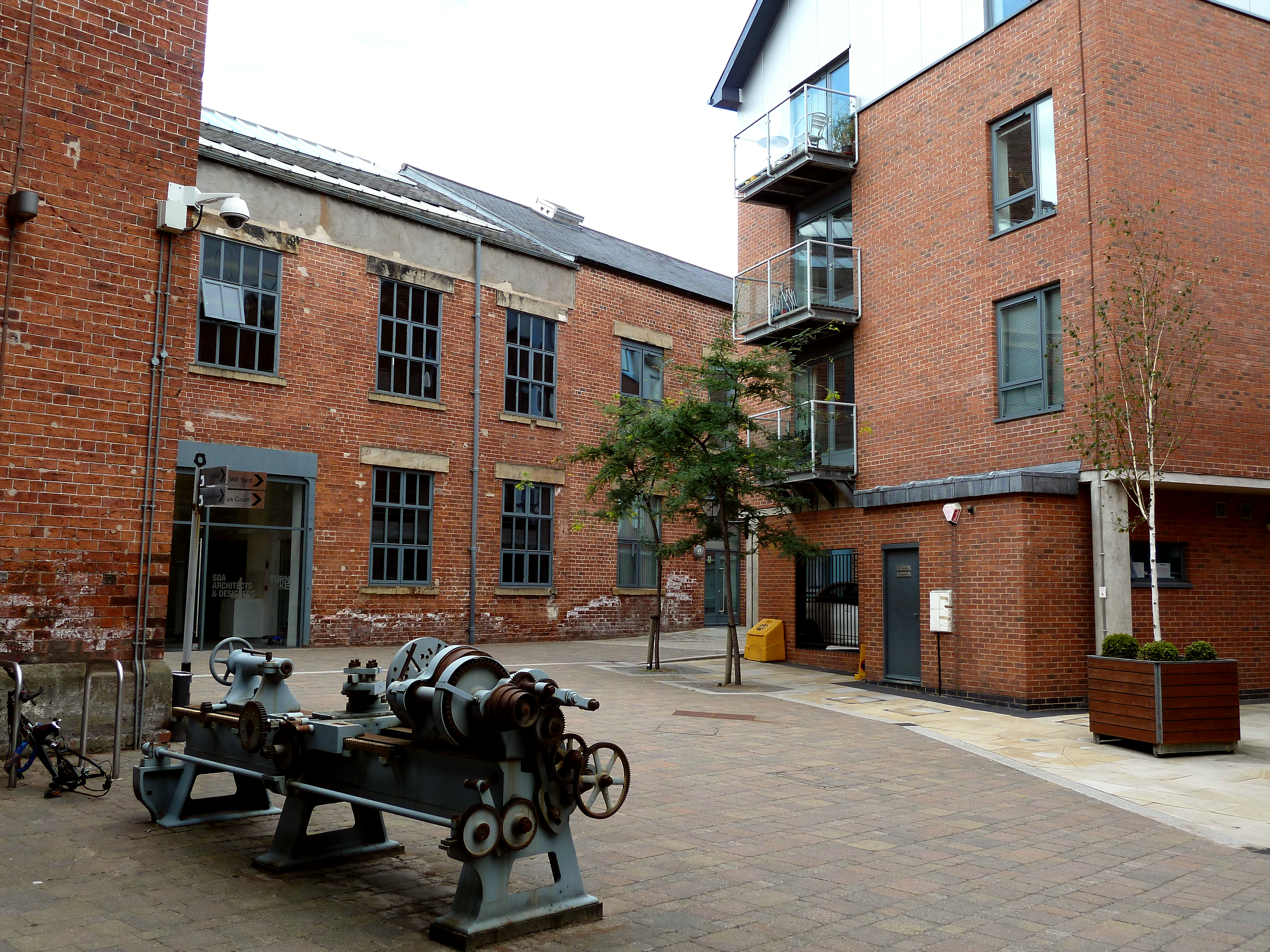
Holbeck Urban Village

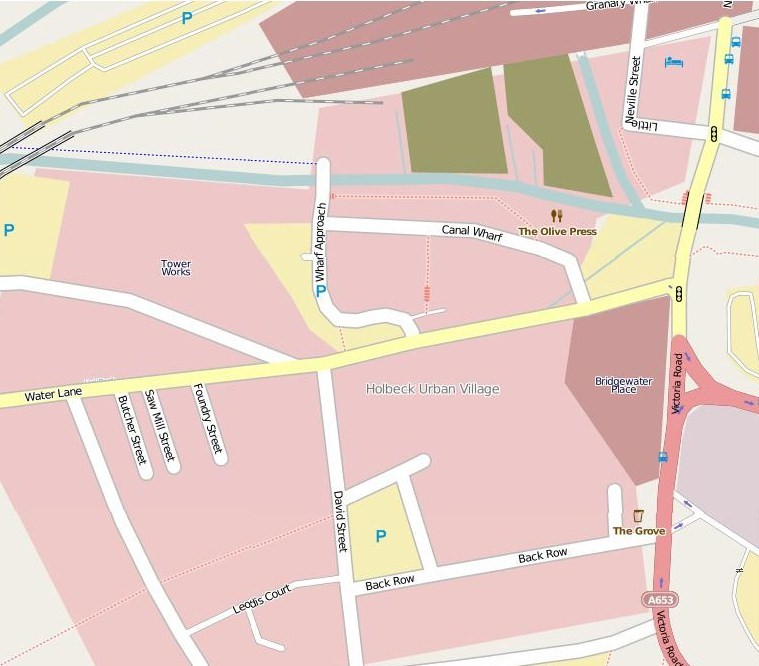
Street plan of Holbeck Urban Village

Holbeck Urban Village is an area of Leeds city centre, close to Leeds railway station that has been undergoing a period of urban renewal.

== Description ==
The designated area, part of Holbeck, is located amongst ex-locomotive engineering and manufacturing buildings, some dating back to the 18th century on the south side of the River Aire. Among the listed buildings on the site are Marshall's Mill, Temple Works, Tower Works and the Round Foundry. The urban village concept is being used alongside government investment to encourage building developers to create a mix of residential, business, and leisure facilities.

The Tower Works was topped out in January 2012. Topping out is a completion ceremony for the builders, and usually a VIP is invited to lay the final stone.

== Criticisms ==
Some local friction has been caused by the Holbeck Urban Village being cited as 'expensive' and as a focus for government investment whilst ignoring adjacent back to back housed areas of Holbeck and Beeston Hill.
