= Bradford, Wakefield and Leeds Railway =

Railway Company

The Bradford, Wakefield and Leeds Railway was an independent railway company that built a line between Wakefield and a junction close to Leeds, in Yorkshire, England. It opened its main line in 1857, and was worked by the Great Northern Railway (GNR). The line shortened the GNR route to Leeds.

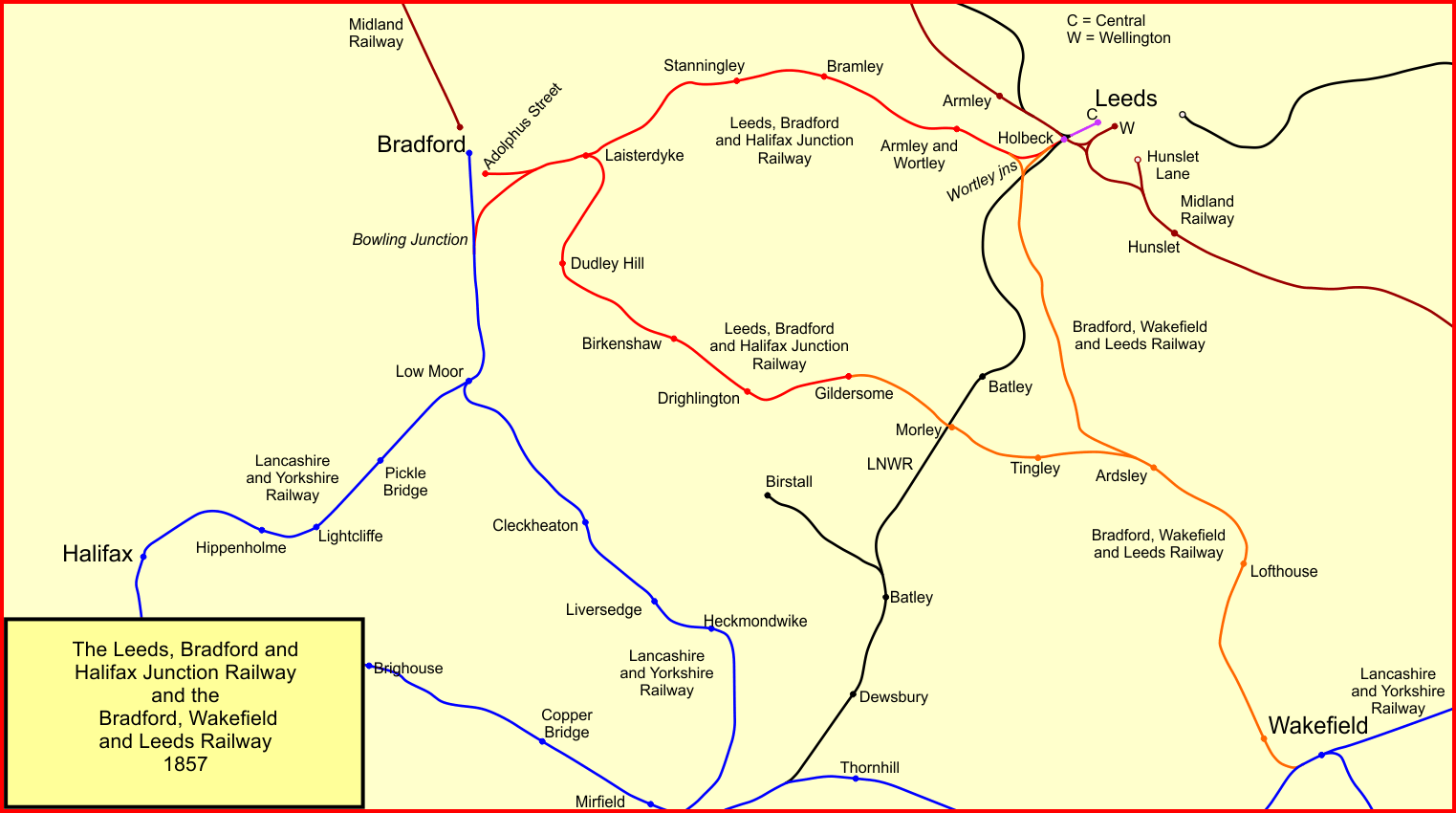
The Bradford, Wakefield and Leeds Railway system in 1857

The BW&LR later built a branch line from near Wakefield to Batley, opening in stages to 1863. In that year it changed its name to the West Yorkshire Railway, and planned a branch line from Lofthouse to Methley, forming an eastwards link to other companies' lines. It agreed to make the line jointly with the North Eastern Railway and the Lancashire and Yorkshire Railway, and the branch line became the Methley Joint Railway, opening in 1865. In that year the West Yorkshire Railway (former BW&LR) was absorbed by the Great Northern Railway.

The original main line is part of the present-day electrically operated Doncaster to Leeds main line.

== Origins ==
At the conclusion of a parliamentary struggle, the Great Northern Railway was authorised in 1846 to build a railway line from London to York. York was already reached from London by linked railways in the group controlled by George Hudson, the so-called Railway King. His business methods were tough and effective, but they were also underhand and dishonest, and eventually he was found out and disgraced.

The Great Northern Railway promoters had wanted branches to Sheffield and Leeds, but these were cut out of the authorisation in Parliament. Leeds was an important commercial centre, and the GNR had to take alternative steps to reach it. For a time the only possibility was over the Lancashire and Yorkshire Railway from Askern Junction (north of Doncaster) to Knottingley and Methley, and from there over the Midland Railway to Gelderd Junction, immediately outside the Leeds Central station. GNR trains making that journey finally reached the station by reversing over a short length of the Leeds and Thirsk Railway. The first GNR trains reached Leeds by this route on 1 October 1849. The Midland Railway was firmly under the control of George Hudson and was therefore hostile to the GNR, but Hudson was at the final stage of his powers and his initial antagonism became ineffective.

On 1 August 1854, the Leeds, Bradford and Halifax Junction Railway opened its line between Leeds and Bowling, near Bradford. Great Northern Railway trains ran over it, reaching Halifax over the Lancashire and Yorkshire Railway. For the first time a direct communication from Halifax to London without break of journey was created. Although the LB&HJR was independent, the beginnings of a Great Northern Railway network in West Yorkshire were visible.

== Authorisation ==
Bradford, Wakefield and Leeds Railway Act 1854
- Act of Parliament
- Parliament of the United Kingdom
- Long title: An Act for making a Railway from the Leeds, Bradford, and Halifax Junction Railway near Leeds to Wakefield, all in the West Riding of the County of York, to be called "The Bradford, Wahcfield, and Leeds Railway;" and for other Purposes.
- Citation: 17 & 18 Vict. c. clx

Dates
- Royal assent: 10 July 1854

Text of statute as originally enacted

Nevertheless, there were still some significant gaps in the railway system, and another independent company, the Bradford, Wakefield and Leeds Railway secured its authorising act of Parliament, the Bradford, Wakefield and Leeds Railway Act 1854 (17 & 18 Vict. c. clx) on 10 July 1854. Authorised share capital was £180,000.

It was to be built from the Wakefield station of the Lancashire and Yorkshire Railway, via Ardsley, to Wortley Junction on the LB&HJR, near Leeds. Wortley Junction was to be formed as a triangular junction, enabling direct running from Wakefield towards Bradford and Halifax.

The originating point was Ings Road Junction, immediately west of the Wakefield station of the Lancashire and Yorkshire Railway, later Wakefield Kirkgate station. The line was double track and stations were at Wakefield (Westgate), Lofthouse, and Ardsley.

== Opening and train services ==
The new line was opened on 5 October 1857, following a ceremonial opening on 3 October; it was worked by the Great Northern Railway which already worked the majority of trains on the Leeds, Bradford and Halifax Junction line.

GNR trains could already run from the south to Wakefield over the L&YR. The opening of the BW&LR gave the GNR direct access to Leeds without running over the rival Midland Railway, and without the necessity to reverse direction on the approach to Leeds itself. This was a very considerable advantage for the GNR, and from 12 November 1857 the company transferred most of its long-distance trains on to the route.

== Friction with the GNR; and possible amalgamation ==
From November 1857 the GNR complained about poor permanent way conditions between Wakefield and Leeds, and threatened to transfer its traffic back to the Methley route of the Midland Railway. In October the Bradford, Wakefield and Leeds Railway gave notice that from 1 January 1858 it would appoint its own station staff. The GNR abruptly withdrew its engines and coal wagons, in effect ceasing to work the line. The BW&LR hurriedly had to acquire engines and wagons of its own. For a few months it hired wagons from the GNR.

In 1859 there was a proposal that the Leeds, Bradford and Halifax Junction Railway and the BW&LR should amalgamate, but the idea came to nothing. In fact both lines were dependent on the Great Northern Railway for the majority of their income.

== Branch line to Ossett, and Batley ==
Bradford, Wakefield and Leeds Railway Act 1860
- Act of Parliament
- Parliament of the United Kingdom
- Long title: An Act to empower the Bradford, Wakefield, and Leeds Railway Company to construct a Railway to Ossett in the West Riding of the County of York; and for other Purposes.
- Citation: 23 & 24 Vict. c. clxvii

Dates
- Royal assent: 23 July 1860

Text of statute as originally enacted

The BW&LR obtained an act of Parliament, the Bradford, Wakefield and Leeds Railway Act 1860 (23 & 24 Vict. c. clxvii), on 23 July 1860 for a branch to Ossett. It was single line, and left the main line at Wrenthorpe [south] junction, just north of Wakefield. It ran as far as Roundwood colliery, carrying mineral traffic from 6 January 1862. Soon after it was extended to a station named "Ossett", in fact at Flushdyke, opening on 7 April 1862, but minerals had been carried between Roundwood Colliery sidings and Wrenthorpe since 6 January.

Captain Rich of the Board of Trade inspected the new line on 12 March 1864 and found it satisfactory, and the remainder of the line to Ossett was opened for traffic on 2 April 1864. It was a single line, 65 chains long, and there was a viaduct with three brick arches of 30 feet span. A new platform at a higher level was provided at Flushdyke, although to reach it passengers had to cross the rails of the earlier line.

Bradford, Wakefield and Leeds Railway Act 1861
- Act of Parliament
- Parliament of the United Kingdom
- Long title: An Act to empower the Bradford, Wakefield, and Leeds Railway Company to construct a Railway from Ossett to join the London and North-western Railway at or near Batley, all in the West Riding of the County of York; and for other Purposes.
- Citation: 24 & 25 Vict. c. xxviii

Dates
- Royal assent: 17 May 1861

The BW&LR had obtained the Bradford, Wakefield and Leeds Railway Act 1861 (24 & 25 Vict. c. xxviii) on 17 May 1861 to further extend the line to Batley, a distance of 3 miles 55 chains. The new line was to make a junction with the LB&HJR line at Batley. (Note: Wrottesley says that the line had its own station at Batley, just south of the junction with the LB&HJR. In fact the Ossett line had its own platforms, forming an extension to the existing station.) The works were considerable, including two tunnels: Chickenley Heath (47 yd) and Shaw Cross (209 yd). The single line route opened on 15 December 1864. The combined branches formed a third route between Wakefield and Bradford.

== Change of name ==
West Yorkshire Railway Act 1863
- Act of Parliament
- Parliament of the United Kingdom
- Long title: An Act to enable the Bradford, Wakefield, and Leeds Railway Company to make a Railway to Methley in the West Riding of the County of York; and for other Purposes.
- Citation: 26 & 27 Vict. c. clxvii

Dates
- Royal assent: 21 July 1863

Text of statute as originally enacted

In the 1863 session of Parliament the BW&LR sought powers to change its name to the West Yorkshire Railway, and this was sanctioned by the West Yorkshire Railway Act 1863 (26 & 27 Vict. c. clxvii) of 21 July 1863.

== Methley joint line ==
Also in the 1863 session of Parliament the BW&LR sought powers for a branch to Methley, and this too was sanctioned by the West Yorkshire Railway Act 1863, giving running powers over the North Eastern Railway from Methley to Castleford. The Lancashire and Yorkshire Railway and the North Eastern Railway had opposed this line, but they had acquiesced on the promise of its being made joint with them. This was ratified by the Methley Railway Act 1864 (27 & 28 Vict. c. lv) of 23 June 1864, and the line became known as the Methley joint line, or the Methley Joint Railway.

The railway diverged from the West Yorkshire Railway at Lofthouse North junction, and joined the North Eastern Railway at Methley Joint Line junction; there was a spur at Methley connecting to the L&YR. The line opened in August 1865 for goods traffic, but passenger working was delayed until 1 June 1869. The south curve at Lofthouse was brought into use on 1 May 1876.

== Amalgamation with the Great Northern Railway ==
West Yorkshire Railway Act 1865
- Act of Parliament
- Parliament of the United Kingdom
- Long title: An Act for enabling the West Yorkshire Railway Company to raise further Money; and for other Purposes.
- Citation: 28 & 29 Vict. c. cclxxv

Dates
- Royal assent: 5 July 1865

Text of statute as originally enacted

Great Northern and West Yorkshire Railways Amalgamation Act 1865
- Act of Parliament
- Parliament of the United Kingdom
- Long title: An Act for the Amalgamation of the West Yorkshire Railway Company with the Great Northern Railway Company.
- Citation: 28 & 29 Vict. c. cccxxxi

Dates
- Royal assent: 5 July 1865

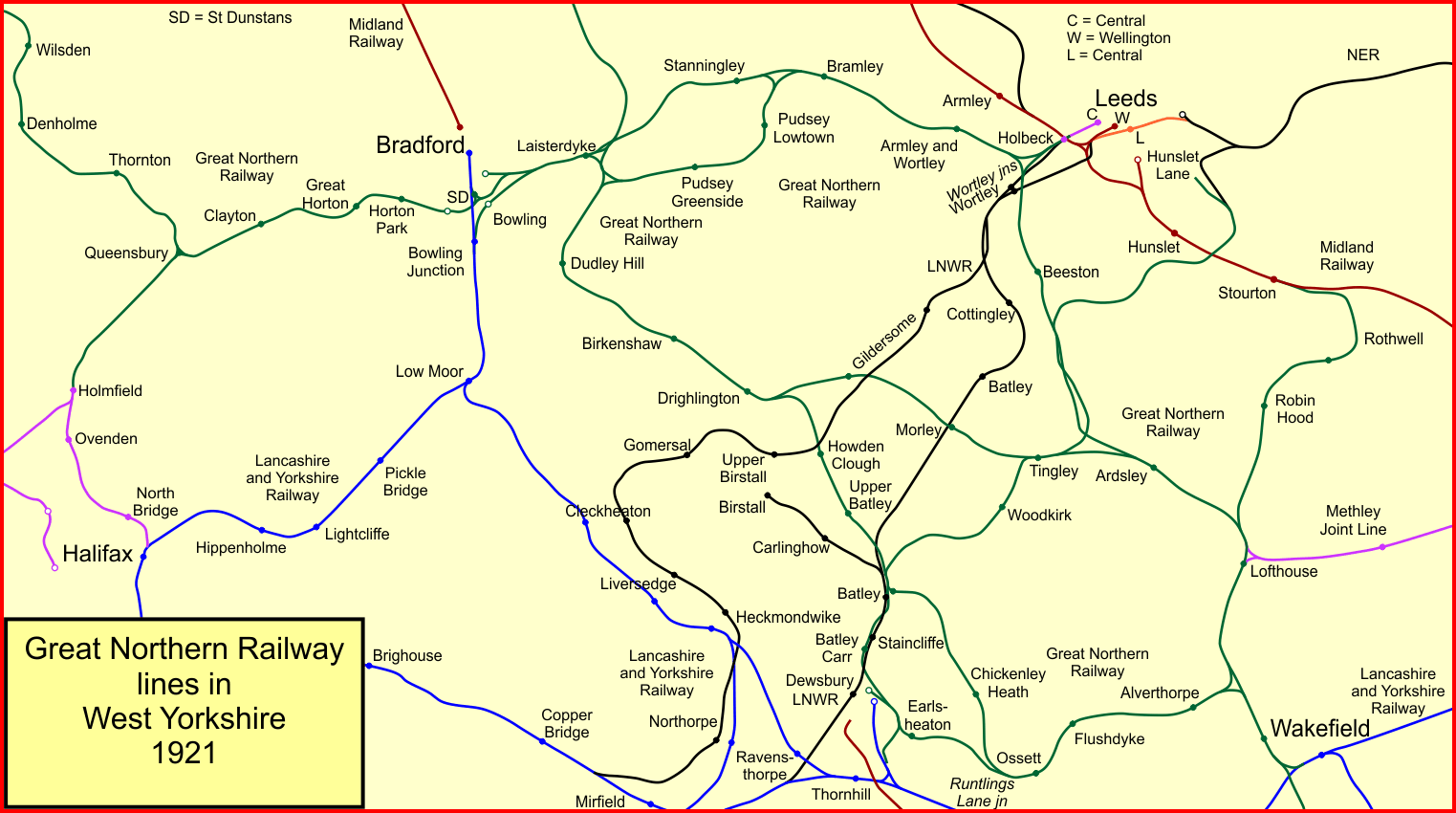
Great Northern Railway lines in West Yorkshire in 1921

The West Yorkshire Railway, together with the Leeds, Bradford and Halifax Junction Railway, had become dominated by the Great Northern Railway, which operated their trains, and the occasional talk of absorption by the GNR became serious. In the face of strenuous L&YR opposition, the West Yorkshire Railway (former BW&LR) as well as the LB&HJR passed into GNR possession. The GNR took over working of the WYR on 1 January 1865, ratified by an act of Parliament, the Great Northern and West Yorkshire Railways Amalgamation Act 1865 (28 & 29 Vict. c. cccxxxi) of 5 July; the one third share of the Methley Joint line became GNR property from 5 September. The WYR shareholders were guaranteed a minimum dividend of 6%.

== West Riding and Grimsby Railway ==
On 1 February 1866 the West Riding and Grimsby Railway was opened, jointly owned by the Great Northern Railway and the Manchester, Sheffield and Lincolnshire Railway. Part of the line formed a direct link between Doncaster and Wakefield, leading on to the former BW&LR line. At last the GNR had a direct route under its own control from Doncaster to Leeds.

== Ossett to Batley via Dewsbury ==
The West Yorkshire Railway network had become an integral part of the Great Northern Railway system in the area.

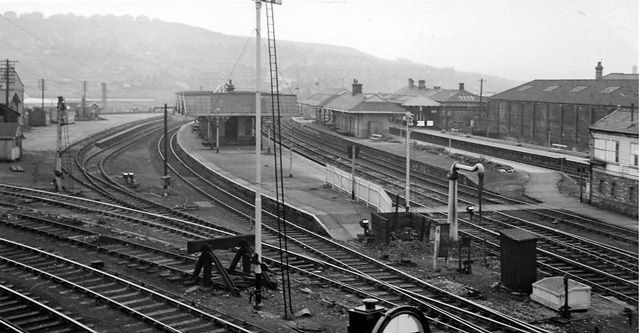
Batley LNWR and GN station; the GNR trains used the right-hand island platform.

The Ossett and Batley line passed Dewsbury by, and the GNR decided to make a new line connecting Dewsbury into the system. The Great Northern Railway Act 1871 (34 & 35 Vict. c. clxii) of 24 July 1871 authorised this. Work started on 9 April 1872; the project included doubling the line from Wrenthorpe junction to Ossett; this was completed to Runtlings Lane junction by August 1873. A new north curve was made at Wrenthorpe, opened to goods trains from March 1875 and passenger trains from 1 May 1876. The new line was 2 miles 1 chain (2.01 miles, 3.24 km) in length to a temporary Dewsbury terminus station. Goods traffic to Dewsbury began on 1 May 1874 and passenger trains on 9 September, when a service of 14 trains each way on weekdays and five each way on Sundays was put on between Wakefield and Dewsbury. On 1 May 1876 six trains each way on weekdays and three on Sundays began between Leeds and Dewsbury via the new Wrenthorpe curve, increased to eight each way on weekdays in June.

A collapse in the financial markets caused the GNR to defer proceeding to Batley, and the powers granted by Parliament to do so lapsed; they were authorised once again by the Great Northern Railway Act 1877 (40 & 41 Vict. c. lxxx) of 12 July 1877. An agreement was made with the London and North Western Railway to rebuild Batley station: the new station had two island platforms, the GNR using the two faces on the east side. A permanent station with an island platform was provided at Dewsbury. The new double-track line was 1 mile 74 chains (1.93 miles, 3.10 km) in length, from a new Dewsbury junction on the Ossett-Dewsbury line, leaving the temporary Dewsbury terminus station at the end of a 31 chains (620 m) branch, thereafter used only for goods and minerals. General traffic began on the new line on 12 April 1880; most of the trains which had used the old West Yorkshire single line between Ossett and Batley were diverted via Dewsbury. The old line was now referred to as the Chickenley Heath branch.

A railmotor operated a shuttle service between Ossett and Chickenley Heath, but a parallel tram service killed that off: it closed on 1 July 1909.

== Headfield spur ==
A connecting line was built at Dewsbury from Dewsbury Goods junction (formerly Dewsbury junction) to Headfield junction on the L&YR. There was a fourteen span viaduct in its 49 chain length. Goods traffic began in 1887; the curve was sanctioned by the Board of Trade for passenger operation in October 1887, but no regular service was run until 1893, when a joint GNR/L&YR Leeds-Pudsey-Cleckheaton-Batley-Leeds circular service was introduced.

== Post-nationalisation closures ==
The passenger service from Wakefield to Dewsbury (and on to Drighlington) closed from 8 September 1964. The entire line from Adwalton through Batley to Wrenthorpe Junctions, near Wakefield, closed on 15 February 1965, except for the section from Roundwood Colliery (near Flushdyke) to Wrenthorpe North Junction, which closed on 31 October 1965.

== Electrification ==
In the 1980s a major project of electrification was implemented on the East Coast Main Line and associated routes. The Doncaster to Leeds line was included, and the first electric train ran from Doncaster to Leeds in August 1988.

== Present day ==
The original main line of the BW&LR continues in use as part of the trunk electrified Doncaster to Leeds line. The short section between Wakefield Kirkgate and Wakefield Westgate has not been electrified, but carries an approximately hourly passenger service between Knottingley and Leeds. The Ossett and Batley line, and the Methley joint line, are closed.

== Location list ==
=== First main line ===
- Wakefield Kirkgate; opened 5 October 1840; still open;
- Ings Road Junction;
- Wakefield South Junction;
- Wakefield Westgate; opened 5 October 1857; relocated north 1 May 1867; still open;
- Osset Branch Junction or Wrenthorpe South Junction;
- Wrenthorpe North Junction;
- Lofthouse South Junction;
- Lofthouse; opened October 1858; renamed Lofthouse & Outwood 1865; closed 13 June 1960;
- Outwood; opened 12 July 1988; still open;
- Lofthouse North Junction;
- Ardsley; opened 5 October 1857; closed 2 November 1964.
- Ardsley Junction;
- Beeston South Junction;
- Beeston; opened February 1860; closed 2 March 1953;
- Beeston North Junction;
- Wortley South Junction;
- Wortley East Junction;
- Holbeck Junction.

=== Ossett and Batley branch ===
- Ossett Branch Junction;
- Wrenthorpe West Junction;
- Alverthorpe; opened November 1872; closed 5 April 1954;
- Roundwood colliery;
- Ossett; opened 7 April 1862; renamed Flushdyke 2 April 1864; closed 5 May 1941;
- Ossett; opened 2 April 1864; closed 7 September 1964;
- Runtlings Lane Junction;
- Chickenleyheath; opened 2 July 1877; closed 1 July 1909;
- Batley; opened 1848;

=== First Dewsbury branch ===
- Runtlings Lane Junction;
- Earlsheaton; opened 9 September 1874; closed 8 June 1953;
- Dewsbury Junction;
- Dewsbury; opened 9 September 1874; closed 15 March 1880.

=== Dewsbury to Batley ===
- Dewsbury Junction;
- Dewsbury Central; opened 15 March 1880; renamed Dewsbury Central 1951; closed 7 September 1964;
- Batley Carr; opened 15 March 1880; closed 6 March 1950;
- Batley opened 1 August 1890: closed 7 September 1964.

== See also ==
- The Great Northern Railway in Yorkshire
