= Castleford Cutsyke railway station =

Disused railway station in Cutsyke, West Yorkshire, England

Castleford Cutsyke
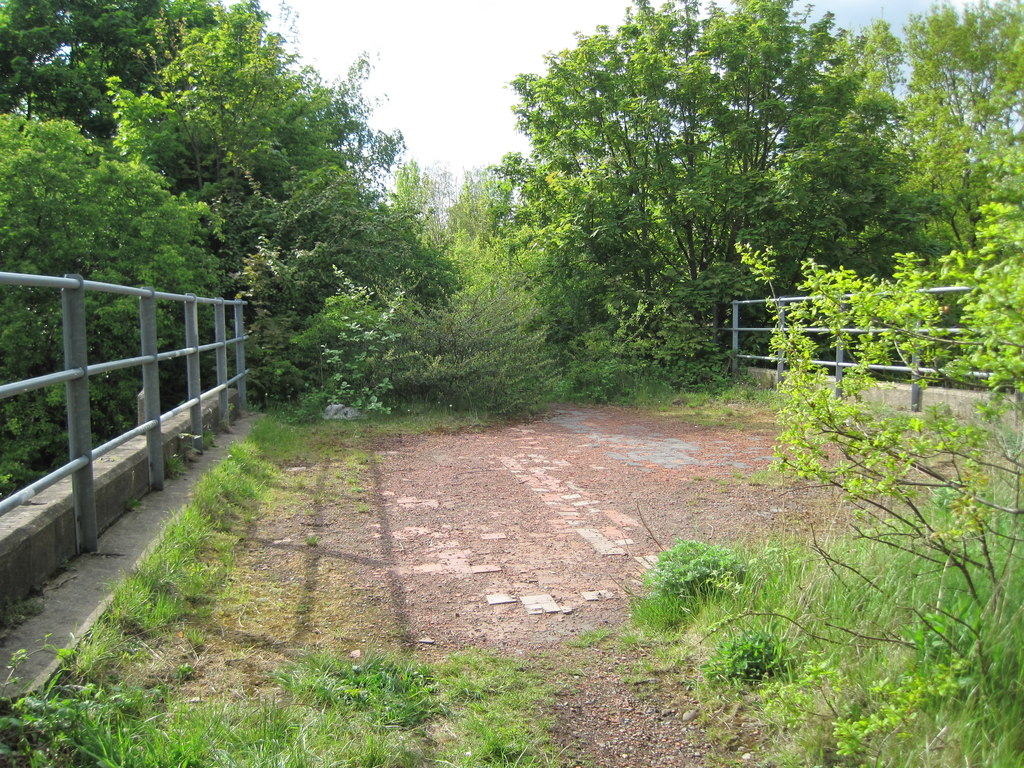
- The site of the station in May 2013

General information
- Location: Cutsyke, Yorkshire; England
- Coordinates: 53.7168°N 1.3657°W
- Grid reference: SE419246
- Platforms: 2

Other information
- Status: Disused

History
- Original company: Lancashire and Yorkshire Railway
- Pre-grouping: Lancashire and Yorkshire Railway
- Post-grouping: London, Midland and Scottish Railway

Key dates
- 16 January 1860: Station opened as Castleford
- 15 September 1952: Renamed to Castleford Cutsyke
- 7 October 1968: Station Closed
Location

Castleford Cutsyke railway station served the Cutsyke area of Castleford in West Yorkshire, England, from 1860 to 1968 on the Pontefract and Methley Junction Line.

== History ==
The station was opened on 16 January 1860 by the Lancashire and Yorkshire Railway. 'Cutsyke' was added to its name on 15 September 1952. It closed on 7 October 1968.

Preceding station	Disused railways	Following station
Methley South; Line and station closed	Methley Joint Railway	Pontefract Monkhill; Line and station open
Methley Junction; Line open, station closed	Lancashire and Yorkshire Railway	Pontefract Monkhill; Line and station open
