= Methley South railway station =

Former railway station in West Yorkshire, England

Methley South
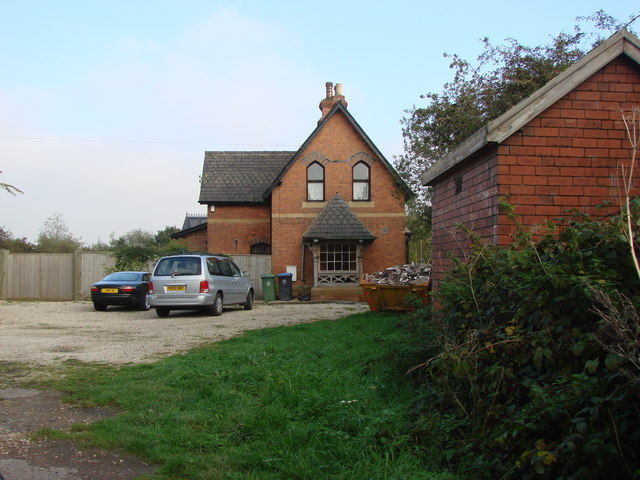
- Station building in October 2006

General information
- Location: Methley, City of Leeds; England
- Coordinates: 53.726410°N 1.398490°W
- Grid reference: SE397257

Other information
- Status: Disused

History
- Original company: Methley Joint Railway
- Pre-grouping: Methley Joint Railway
- Post-grouping: Methley Joint Railway

Key dates
- 1 May 1869: Station opened
- 7 March 1960: Station closed
Location

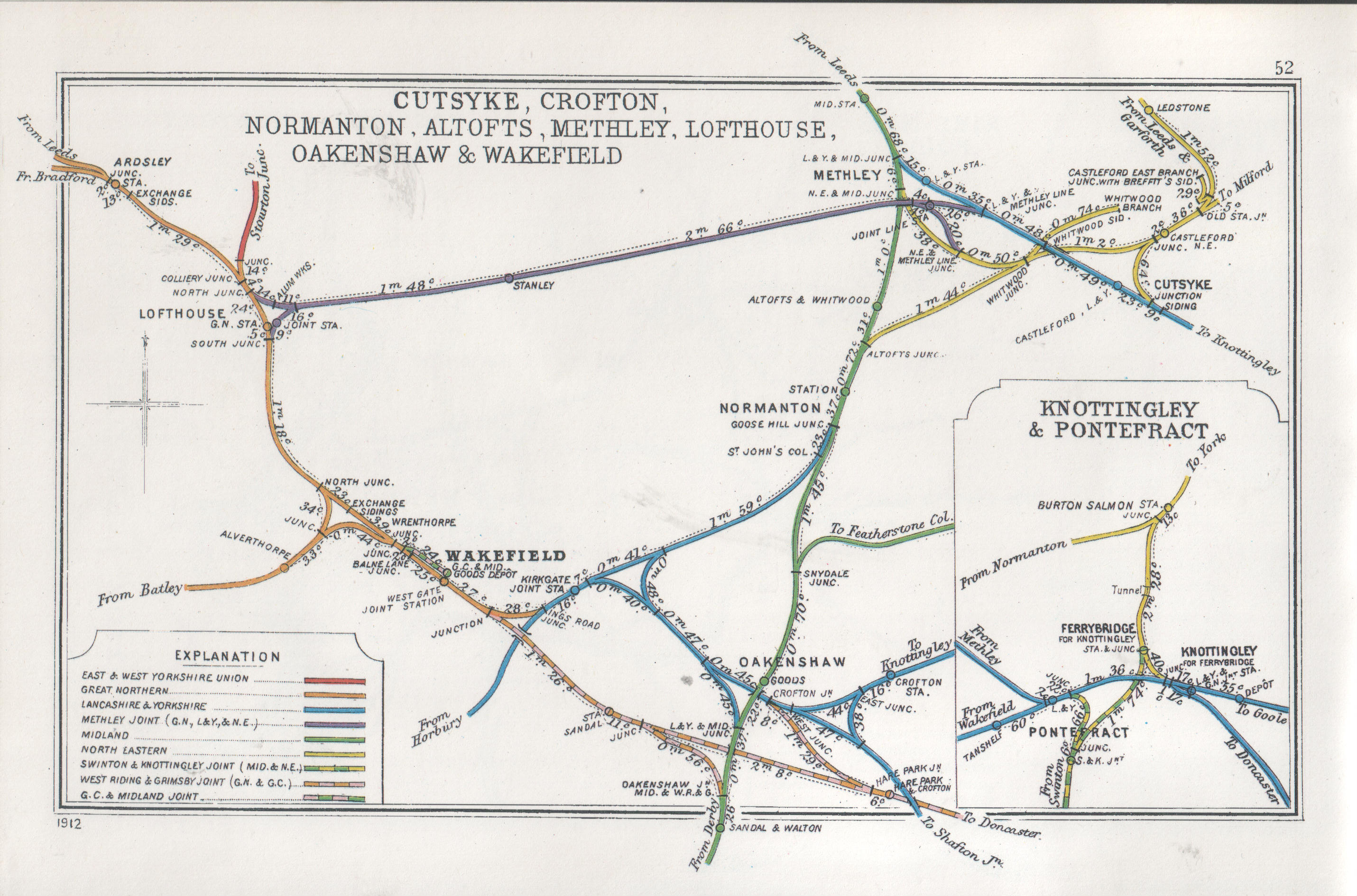
A Railway Clearing House map of lines around Methley and Wakefield in 1912.

Methley South railway station was one of three stations that served the village of Methley, West Yorkshire, England.

The station was built by the Methley Joint Railway, a line in which the Lancashire and Yorkshire Railway, the GNR and the NER were shareholders. The station, opened on 1 May 1869, known as Methley Joint station, renamed to Methley South and was closed on 7 March 1960.

== See also ==
- Methley railway station
- Methley Junction railway station

| Preceding station | Disused railways | Following station |
|---|---|---|
| Stanley | Methley Joint Railway | Castleford Cutsyke |
| Stanley | Methley Joint Railway | Castleford Central |
