= Methley Junction railway station =

Former railway station in West Yorkshire, England

Methley Junction
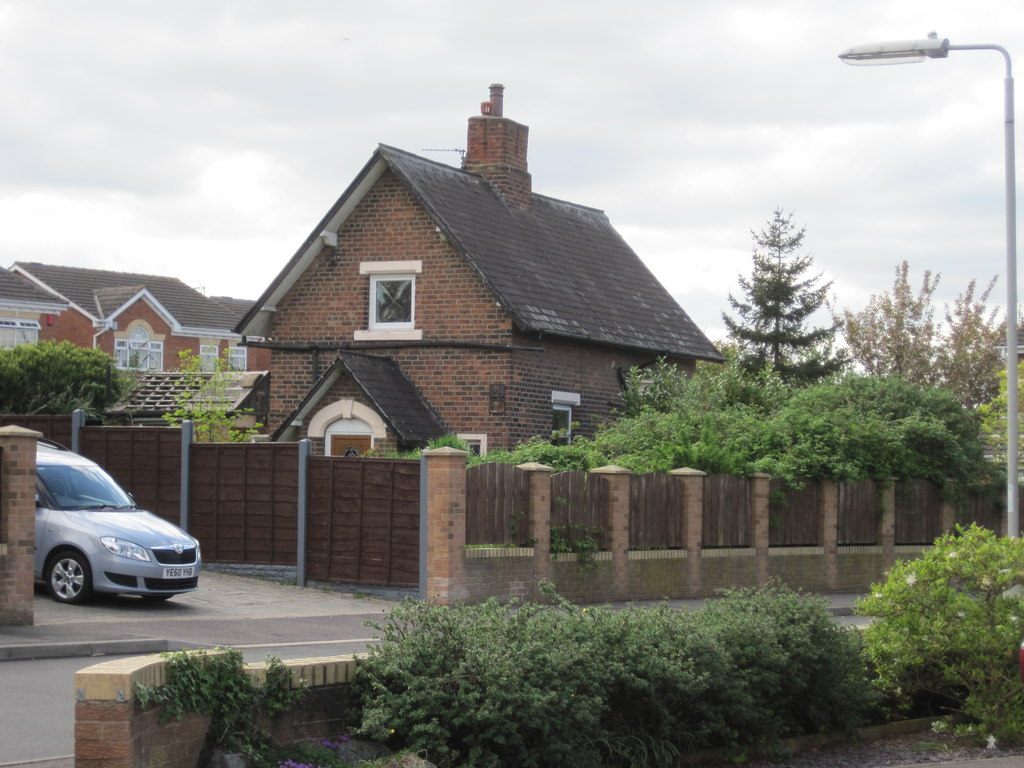
- Site of the former station in May 2013

General information
- Location: Methley, City of Leeds; England
- Coordinates: 53.727726°N 1.399915°W
- Grid reference: SE396258

Other information
- Status: Disused

History
- Pre-grouping: Lancashire and Yorkshire Railway
- Post-grouping: London, Midland and Scottish Railway

Key dates
- 1 October 1849: Station opened
- 4 October 1943: Station closed
Location

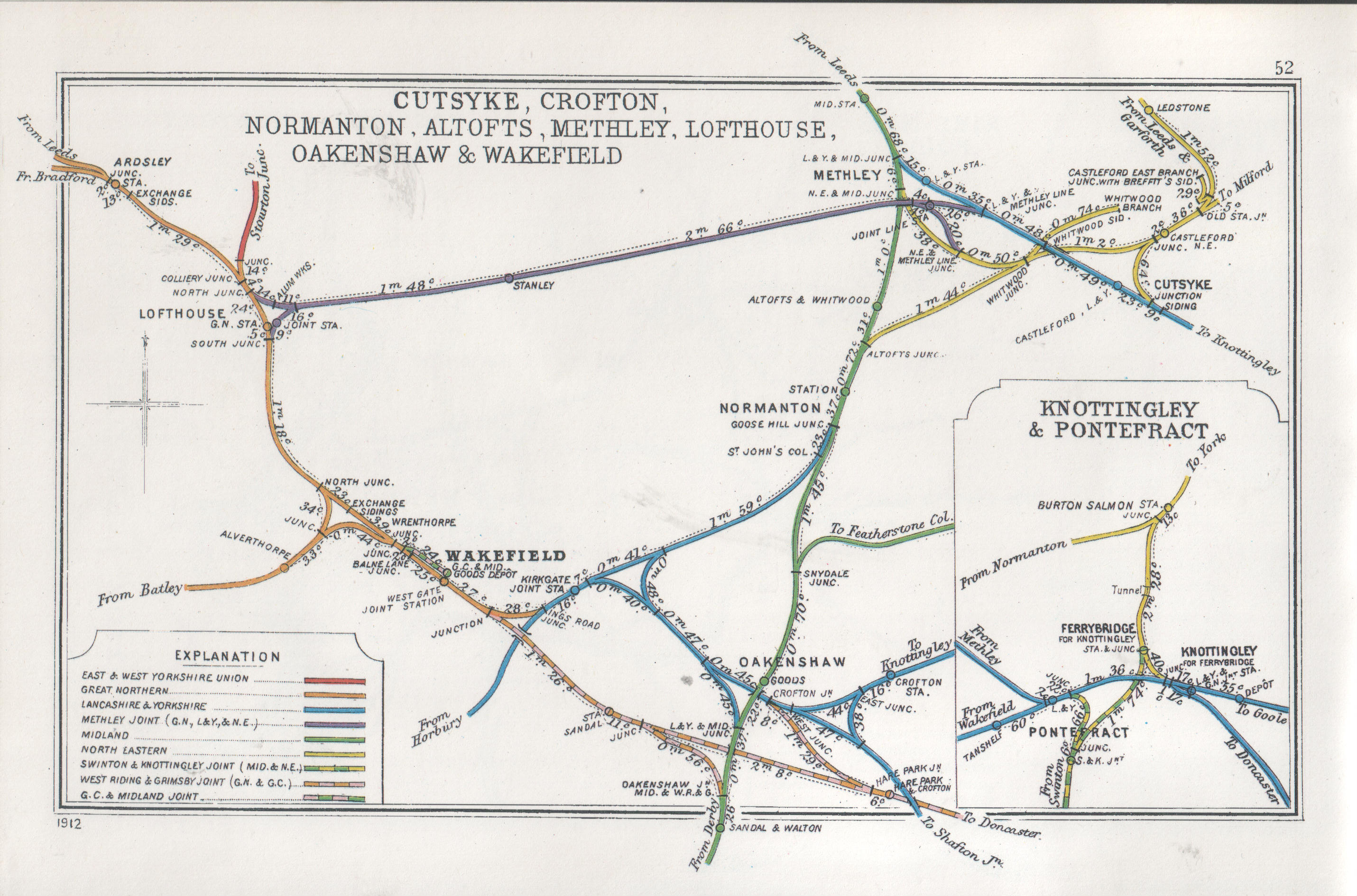
Railway Clearing House diagram including the L&Y Methley station in 1912.

Methley Junction railway station was one of three stations that served the village of Methley, West Yorkshire, England. It opened on 1 October 1849 and closed on 4 October 1943.

The station was built by the Lancashire and Yorkshire Railway on its line from Knottingley which joined the line of the North Midland Railway (currently used by the Hallam Line) north of the junction of the Woodlesford–Castleford (Midland) and the Woodlesford–Normanton (North Eastern Railway) tracks. South of the station, the Methley Joint Railway to Lofthouse branched off from the Lancashire and Yorkshire line. The station building is now a private house but the site of the former station is now part of a housing estate.

== See also ==
- Methley railway station
- Methley South railway station
