= Altofts railway station =

Disused railway station in West Yorkshire, England

Altofts
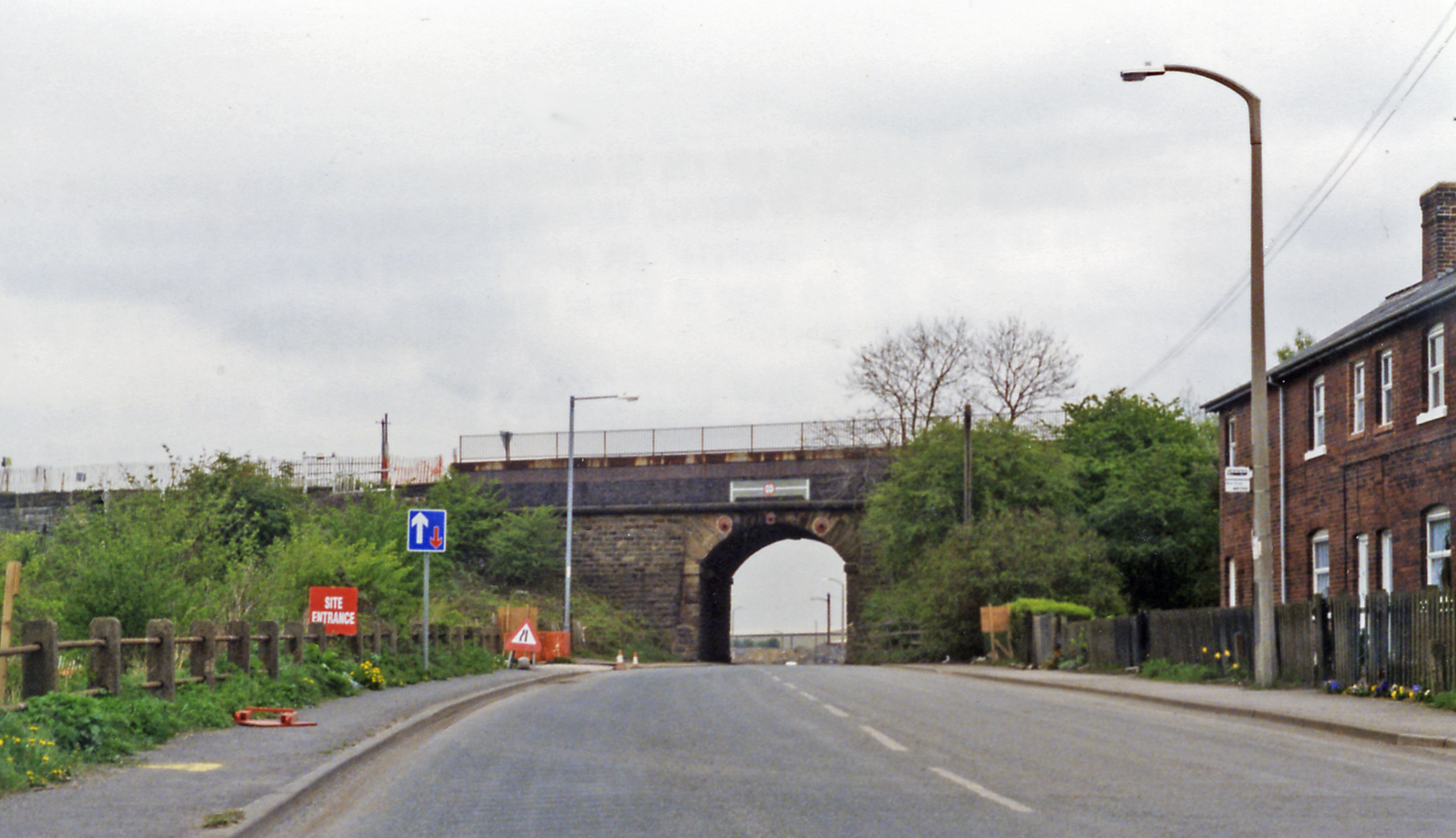
- Location of the former station in April 1995

General information
- Location: Altofts, City of Wakefield; England
- Coordinates: 53.71599°N 1.40890°W
- Grid reference: SE391245
- Platforms: 2

Other information
- Status: Disused

History
- Original company: Midland Railway
- Pre-grouping: Midland Railway
- Post-grouping: London Midland and Scottish Railway

Key dates
- 1 September 1870: Opened as Altofts and Whitwood
- 4 May 1970: Renamed Altofts
- 14 May 1990: Closed
Location

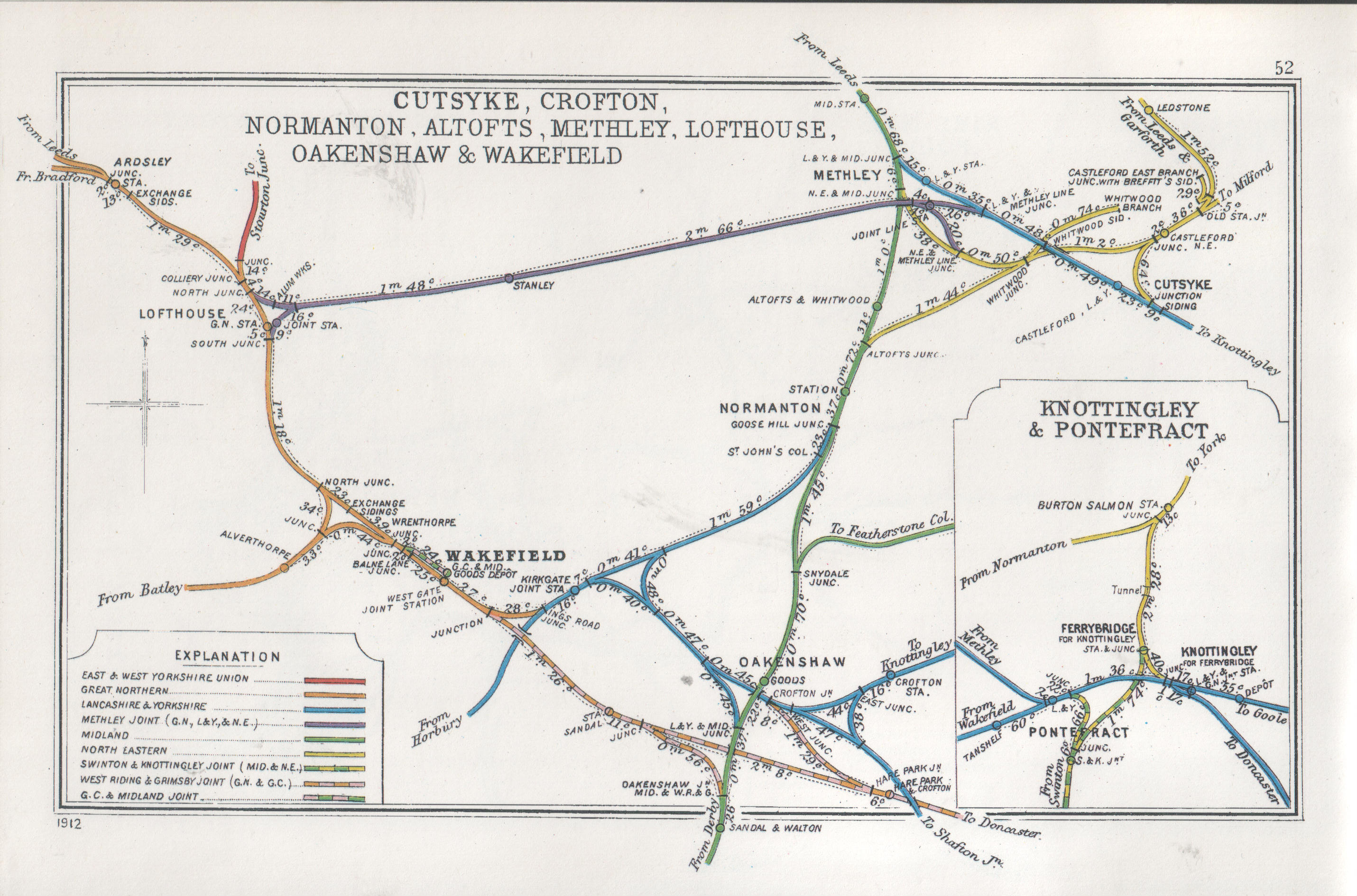
A Railway Clearing House diagram including Altofts in 1912

Altofts railway station served the village of Altofts near Normanton in the English county of West Yorkshire. It was opened in 1870 as Altofts and Whitwood by the Midland Railway on its line from Derby to Leeds Wellington Station. Much of the village of Altofts is in fact closer to Normanton station.

It was built on an embankment using spoil from the cutting south of Normanton. The area was in any case, prone to subsidence, resulting in speed restrictions and the need to shore up the platforms. North of the station the line crosses the Aire and Calder Navigation and the River Calder by means of a viaduct of five 60-foot (18.3 m) arches.

== History ==
Opened by the Midland Railway on 1 September 1870, and originally named Altofts and Whitwood, it became part of the London, Midland and Scottish Railway during the Grouping of 1923. The line then passed on to the Eastern Region of British Railways on nationalisation in 1948.

When rail sectorisation was introduced in the 1980s, the station was served by Regional Railways under arrangements with the WYPTE METRO.

The name was simplified to Altofts on 4 May 1970 and the station closed on 14 May 1990, the last day of service being 12 May 1990.

=== Post closure ===
Faster services on the Hallam line currently run past the former station on their way from Normanton to Woodlesford. These have operated since 2006, with alternate trains running through to Nottingham since December 2008. Slower trains since 1988 instead follow an alternative route along the former North Eastern Railway lines from Normanton to Castleford, where they have to reverse direction, rather than the direct line through Altofts.

The industrial estates associated with Wakefield Europort now surround the unredeveloped station site.

Preceding station	Historical railways	Following station
Normanton	Midland Railway (North Midland main line)	Methley
Normanton	Regional Railways / WYPTE METRO; Hallam Line (Line open; station closed)	Woodlesford
