= The Great Northern Railway in Yorkshire =

The Great Northern Railway developed an extensive network over time, having started in 1846 with the intention of connecting London and York, as well as other major Yorkshire towns. The Great Northern Railway in Yorkshire was a major part of that, although the GNR did not succeed in reaching York as it originally intended. By acquiring running powers it reached Leeds, Bradford and Halifax over other companies' lines, as well as Barnsley Sheffield and Grimsby, and then York too. After acquiring local companies it developed a network, chiefly in West Yorkshire. Later it built lines north and west of Bradford into hilly terrain, and these were very expensive to build, and never repaid the initial cost.

Carrying coal to the southern counties was its primary business: huge volumes were conveyed; however fast passenger express trains memorably caught the public imagination. Passenger express operation within West Yorkshire was important too, especially as residential travel developed. The St Leger race meetings at Doncaster attracted huge volumes of excursions, 1,149 excursion trains over four days in 1888. Towards the end of the nineteenth century the earlier raw competition softened, and some co-operation with other major companies became possible, especially with the Lancashire and Yorkshire Railway.

The Great Northern Railway was a constituent of the London and North Eastern Railway from the Grouping of the railways in 1923, and the LNER itself formed part of the nationally owned British Railways from 1948. As mineral extraction declined in the areas originally served, the fortunes of many branch lines declined too, and in the 1960s many lines closed. Many of the former GNR lines were closed, and the remaining GNR Yorkshire routes are Doncaster to Shaftholme Junction (towards York), Doncaster to Leeds, and Leeds to Bradford via New Pudsey.

== Authorisation of the Great Northern Railway ==
The Great Northern Railway got its authorising Act of Parliament on 26 June 1846. It was a huge project: its authorised share capital was £5.6 million. At first it had named itself the London and York Railway, and York was to be its northern destination. There were to be branch lines to Sheffield and Leeds. However, Parliament reduced the scope of the project, and the Sheffield and Wakefield branches were removed from the scheme; the name was changed to the Great Northern Railway. The authorised network was therefore to be a main line to York: 186 miles, and a loop line from Peterborough to Bawtry via Boston and Lincoln: 86 miles; in addition there were some short branches in the south.

The directors were elated to have received authorisation for their line after a considerable Parliamentary struggle, but were dismayed to have lost the Yorkshire branches, which they considered commercially important. They set about securing alternative means of serving the lost areas.

Wrottesley elaborates:

The GN itself failed to gain independent access to Leeds only because of an error in the levels, as the [Parliamentary] Committee felt the GN should have its line, and rejected competing schemes of the Midland and the Leeds & Dewsbury. This disappointment was somewhat offset by the assured success of the Leeds Central station Bill, which [became] an Act until 22 July 1848, to which was scheduled the running power agreement between the GN and M&L [Manchester and Leeds Railway]. The capital was £320,000, equally provided by the four companies [that were to build the station jointly]... The M&L had just changed its name to the Lancashire & Yorkshire.

The Board decided to concentrate actual construction at first on the East Lincolnshire section of its future network, so that the early beginnings in Yorkshire were, for some time, remote from the rest of the emerging GNR system.

== Doncaster to Leeds ==
Wakefield, and from there Leeds, had been lost, but there were ways that GNR Trains could reach them. Those centres were so important that urgent efforts were made to get access to them. In October 1846 the Great Northern Railway joined with the Leeds and Thirsk Railway, the Leeds and Dewsbury Railway, and the Manchester and Leeds Railway, to deposit a Parliamentary Bill for a joint Leeds Central station, to be built on the north side of the River Aire. The Bill was passed after a delay, on 22 July 1848, with capital of £320,000. By this means the GNR secured a share in a Leeds terminal.

To reach Leeds from Doncaster, the GNR negotiated with the Manchester and Leeds Railway, (which was soon to be joined with others to form the Lancashire and Yorkshire Railway), for running powers for GNR trains over part of its proposed line. An agreement was made on 1 May 1847 giving the GNR running powers from Askern (north of Doncaster) to Wakefield via Knottingley, and to Methley, where the M&LR line would make a junction with the Midland Railway. In return, the agreement gave the M&LR powers from Askern to Doncaster. The arrangement was ratified in the Leeds Central Act of 22 July 1848.

Shaftholme Junction is where the present-day Knottingley line diverges from the East Coast Main Line. Edmund Denison is supposed to have stated in 1850 that the GNR ended "in a ploughed field" there However Shaftholme Junction did not exist until a later time, and the location of the end-on junction was Askern Junction, 264 yards further on, towards Knottingley.

The GNR now negotiated with the Midland Railway for running powers over their line from Methley Junction to Leeds. The Midland Railway was controlled by George Hudson, the so-called Railway King. Hudson was a skilled financier, who used extremely underhand methods to get his way, and was later exposed and cast out of his positions of power. At this stage, however, Hudson was still reigning, and when Hudson signed an undertaking granting the GNR the running powers they sought, the GNR took him at his word. In exchange for the running powers, the GNR agreed not to lodge its intended Parliamentary Bill for a Leeds line.

Early in June 1848 the Lancashire and Yorkshire Railway opened its Wakefield-Knottingley-Goole line, and it was ready to open the Knottingley-Askern junction section. The GNR line between Askern junction and Stockbridge (a short distance north of Doncaster) was ready, so the formal opening from Knottingley to Stockbridge was on 5 June 1848; public traffic commenced on the next day between Knottingley and Askern, and on the following day, over the GNR between Askern and Stockbridge, a distance of 2 miles 45 chains. The remainder, 2 miles 4 chains, from the Bentley road to a temporary station east of the Great North Road at Doncaster was opened on the following 5 August in time for the St Leger race meeting.

The L&YR provided a service of five trains each way on weekdays and two each way on Sundays. The carrier Pickfords dealt with some goods traffic for the time being. This was a remote and disconnected section of the GNR, but the GNR started to operate some of the trains on the Doncaster to Knottingley line from August 1849. The Doncaster station had been makeshift, and a proper station, about a half mile north, was in use from mid-1851.

== Doncaster to Leeds operation started ==
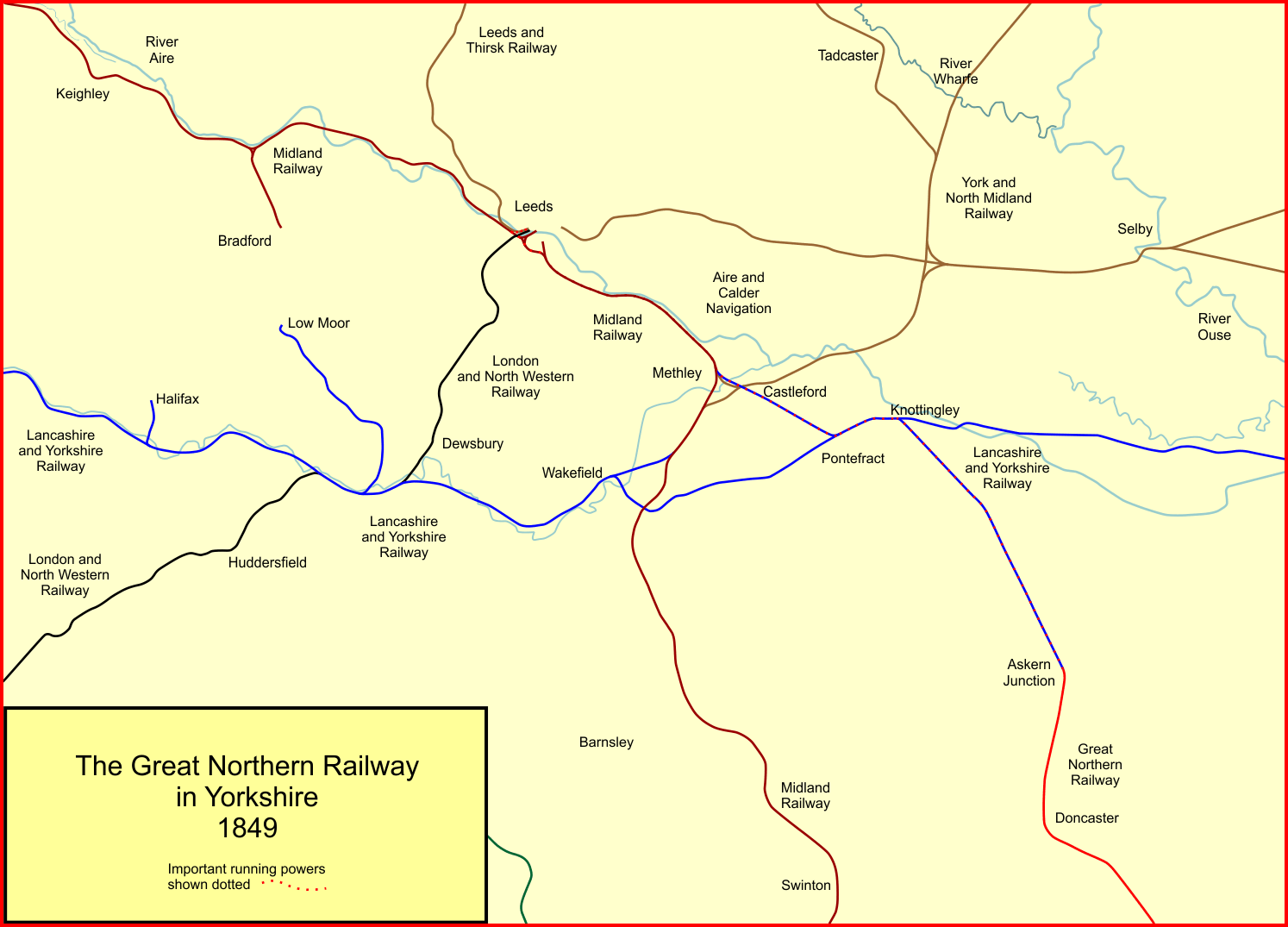
The GNR system in Yorkshire in 1849

As construction proceeded further south, the GNR thought it was now in a position to start running trains between Peterborough and Leeds. The route as far north as Doncaster was very roundabout, via Boston and Lincoln. From Doncaster it was to be over the L&YR between Askern junction and Methley junction, then over the Midland Railway to Gelderd Road (Note: The location is sometimes spelt Geldard Road.) junction just outside Leeds; trains reversed there over a short section of the Leeds and Thirsk Railway to reach the Leeds Central station. The date set for the commencement of through running was 4 September 1849, once again because of the St Leger racing meeting at Doncaster.

However, there was a setback; notwithstanding George Hudson's October 1847 agreement, the Midland Railway authorities now demanded that the GNR undertake to abandon forever any rights to apply for an independent line to Leeds. The GNR refused this extraordinary demand, and the Midland Railway authorities severed the junction at Methley on 3 September 1849 to prevent the running of the GNR trains. As a contemporary newspaper recorded,

The Superintendent at Doncaster, having heard it whispered that something was going on at the junction of the Doncaster line with the Midland Railway at Methley, sent over a special engine before the [planned excursion] trains and found the servants of the Midland Company had removed the points at the junction, so that had the train proceeded thither it would have inevitably run off the road.

Grinling's account of the event is much more prosaic:

some over-zealous officers of the former [Midland Railway] Company took the high-handed action of pulling up the junction rails at Methley to prevent these trains from running, and it was only by producing their agreement with King Hudson and threatening legal proceedings that the Great Northern authorities got them replaced in time. This done, however, the Company was able to profit considerably by the race-going excursionists.

It was not until 1 October that the Midland Railway relented, and GNR trains ran to Leeds by their route.

In 1849 the GNR decided to use a separate station at Leeds to save money, and it told the three other companies in the joint Central Station scheme that it would withdraw. In March 1850 a contract for building the separate station and an engine shed was let. The transfer to the new "Low Level" station took place on 14 May 1850.

== Barnsley over the South Yorkshire Railway ==
The South Yorkshire Railway (formally known as the South Yorkshire, Doncaster and Goole Railway) was authorised on 22 July 1847 to build from Doncaster to Barnsley. The GNR were given running powers over it. It opened its line from Swinton to a triangular junction south of Doncaster station on 10 November 1849, and later extended its line to Barnsley on 1 January 1851. Taking advantage of the running powers, the GNR ran a passenger service between Doncaster and Barnsley; there were four trains each way on weekdays only.

== Reaching York ==
In June 1850 the GNR reviewed its plans for reaching York. It was reaching Knottingley over the Lancashire and Yorkshire Railway. The York and North Midland Railway was on the point of completing a short line from Knottingley to Burton Salmon, which gave access there to the Y&NMR's own line on to York. The GNR was already over-extended in capital account, and its own line to York had not been started. A debate centred around the alternative of building the line, or of making alliances with the Y&NMR. The latter option prevailed, and on 6 June 1850 agreement was reached with the Y&NMR that the GNR would have the running powers to York that it needed, on condition that the GNR abandoned its intended railway to York.

On 8 August 1850, GNR trains first began to run through to York from London Kings Cross (Maiden Lane), a distance of 210 miles.

== Leeds, Bradford and Halifax Junction Railway ==
The GNR was running trains to and from Leeds, but it was an uncomfortable arrangement with awkward routing, and relying on a hostile competing company. The independent Leeds, Bradford and Halifax Junction Railway was authorised by Parliament on 30 June 1852; it built a line between Leeds and Bradford, and gave onward access towards Halifax from near Bradford by running powers over the L&YR. The company was enthusiastically encouraged by the GNR, and the LB&HJR opened its line, from Bradford to just outside Leeds station, on 1 August 1854. The GNR had running powers over the LB&HJR line, and so was able to run through carriages from the south to Leeds, Bradford and Halifax. These services meant a considerable volume of additional traffic at Leeds, such that the Low Level station at Leeds would be far too cramped, and the decision was taken to move the terminus back in to the Central station. The station was built to last: Lawrence, writing in 1909, said "it was opened on August 4th, 1854, and is substantially the same now as it was then".

== Gildersome and Batley branches ==
When the Leeds, Bradford and Halifax Junction Railway was authorised, a branch from Laisterdyke, near Bradford, to Gildersome was included in the powers. In 1856 the Gildersome branch was opened, in fact as a through line connecting Laisterdyke and Ardsley. The continuation had been authorised by Act of 10 July 1854, to form a junction with the Bradford, Wakefield & Leeds, which had been authorised on the same day. The line formed a more direct route from Bradford to Wakefield and the south, albeit with difficult gradients.

In November 1864 the LB&HJR network, supported heavily by the GNR, was further enhanced to connect to Batley, by a branch line from Adwalton Junction on the Gildersome line.

== Bradford, Wakefield and Leeds Railway ==
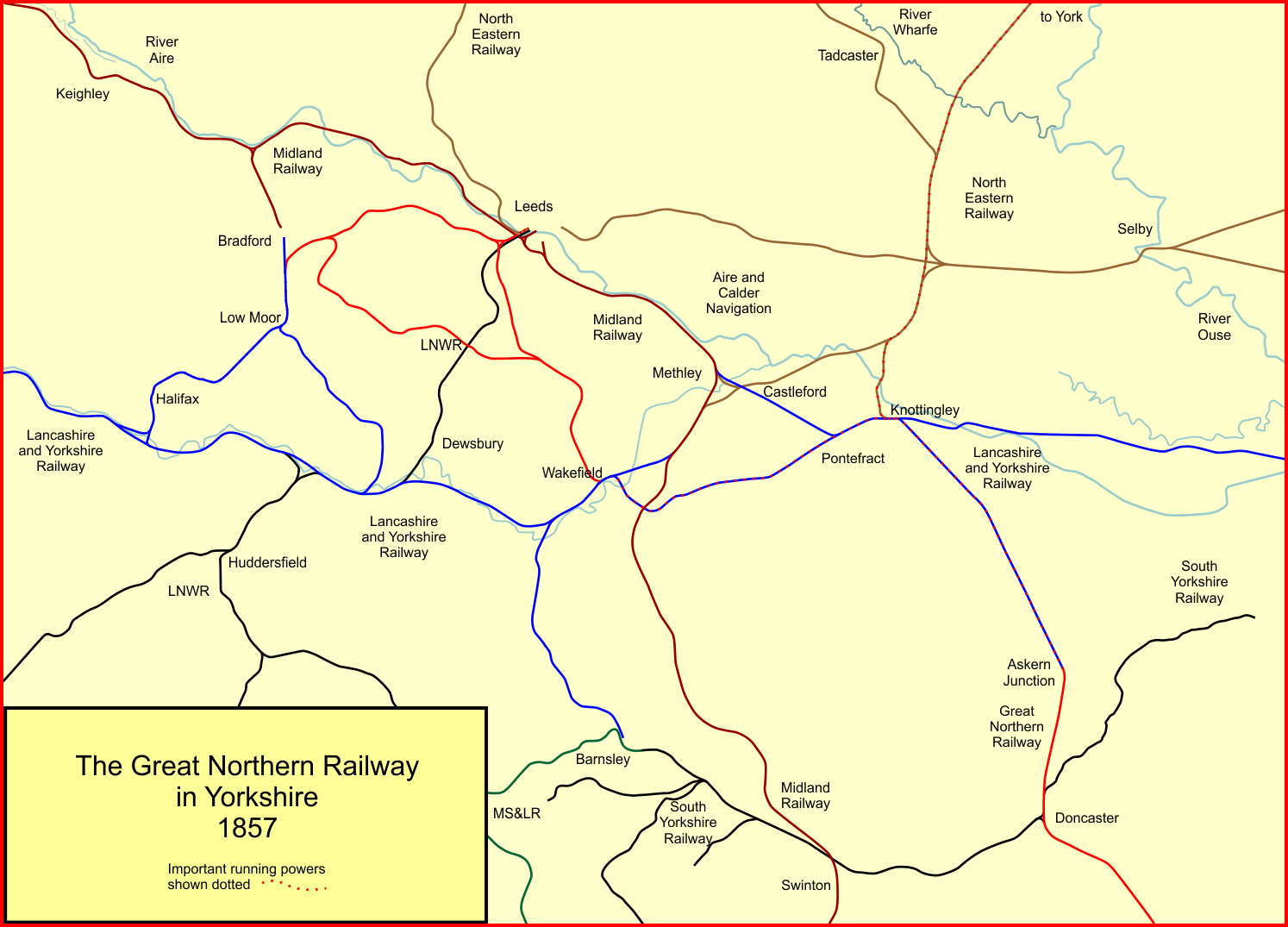
The GNR sysytem in Yorkshire in 1857

The GNR's access to West Yorkshire was further enhanced by the opening to the public on 5 October 1857 of the Bradford, Wakefield and Leeds Railway. Its line ran from Wakefield Kirkgate station to Holbeck junction, immediately south of Leeds. The new line enabled direct running into Leeds Central, avoiding the former reversal off the Leeds and Thirsk Railway; furthermore the route by-passed the Midland Railway. There was a triangular junction at Wortley, outside Leeds, enabling through running from Wakefield to Bradford. The GNR worked the line, and made use of running powers over the Halifax Junction company's line.

== Branch line to Ossett, and Batley ==
The BW&LR obtained an Act on 23 July 1860 for a branch to Ossett. It was a single line, and left the main line at Wrenthorpe junction, just north of Wakefield. It reached an "Ossett" station at Flushdyke on 7 April 1862 and was extended to Ossett itself on 2 April 1864. The line was further extended to Batley, making a junction with the LB&HJR there. The extension opened on 15 December 1864.

In the 1863 session of Parliament the BW&LR sought powers to change its name to the West Yorkshire Railway, and this was sanctioned by an Act of 21 July 1863.

== Methley joint line ==
The BW&LR obtained powers for a connecting branch line to Methley by an Act of 21 July 1863, giving running powers over the North Eastern Railway from Methley to Castleford. The Lancashire and Yorkshire Railway and the North Eastern Railway were brought into joint ownership of the line, which became known as the Methley joint line, or the Methley Joint Railway.

In 1865 the Methley Joint Railway was opened for goods traffic. It provided a useful west–east link between the GNR in the Leeds area, and the L&YR and the North Eastern Railway in the Castleford area. A passenger service was run several years later. A south curve at Lofthouse was brought into use on 1 May 1876.

== GNR takes over ==
The Great Northern Railway had running powers over the Leeds, Bradford and Halifax Junction Railway, and operated the majority of the trains; and it worked the entire traffic of the Bradford, Wakefield and Leeds Junction Railway (now renamed the West Yorkshire Railway). In 1865 it acquired both of those companies; the one third share of the Methley Joint Railway also transferred to the GNR.

== Coal ==
The carriage of coal to London was a prime business for the Great Northern Railway, and the principal source was the South Yorkshire Coalfield. To some extent the coal owners there worked in concert, and were able to bring pressure to bear on the railways. Much of the output was loaded to the South Yorkshire Railway, but that line was also connected to the London and North Western Railway. In December 1861 the LNWR carried 74,953 tons against the combined GNR and Midland total (chiefly via Nottingham) of 42,843 tons. On 23 January 1863 the GNR signed the Coal Traffic Agreement, reducing tolls over the Midland Railway through Nottingham for the GNR but also for the Midland Railway south of Hitchin. In 1863 the GN carried 560,000 tons of coal to London, 770,000 tons in 1864, and 975,000s ton in 1865. It was considered that the increase would have been 25% greater in 1864 if the company had had sufficient engine power and siding accommodation.

== West Riding and Grimsby Railway ==
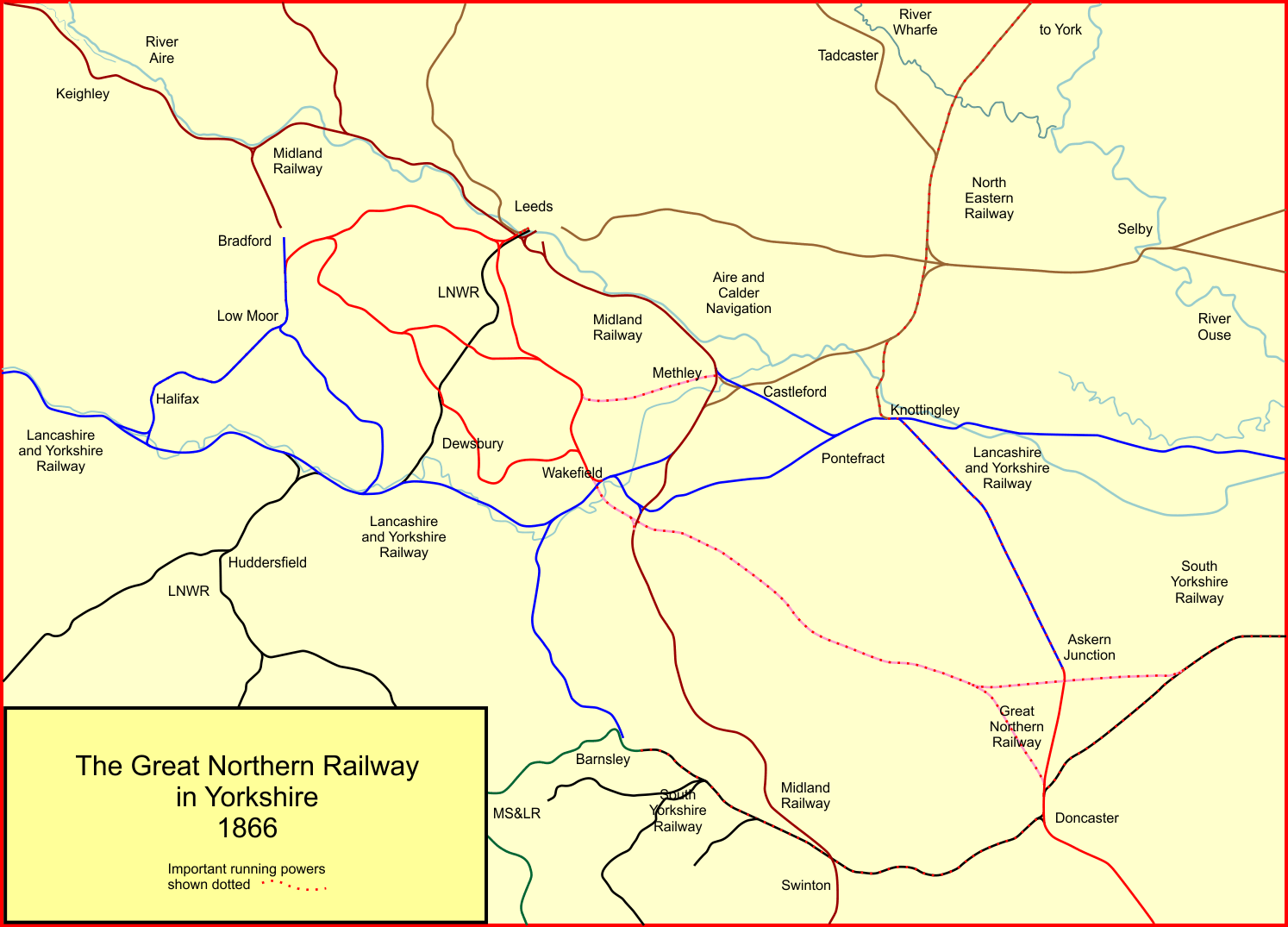
The GNR system in Yorkshire in 1866

On 7 August 1862 the West Riding and Grimsby Railway was authorised. It was to connect Doncaster and Wakefield, with a short line from Adwick towards Stainforth, giving access to Grimsby. It was agreed that the line would be owned jointly by the GNR and the Manchester, Sheffield and Lincolnshire Railway. The line from Doncaster to Wakefield opened on 1 February 1866 and the transfer to joint ownership took place on the same day.

== The Great Northern Railway network in West Yorkshire from 1866 ==
The Great Northern Railway now, in 1866, had a direct route under its own (partly joint) control between Doncaster and Leeds and Bradford, and by running powers to Halifax.

== Shaftholme Junction to York ==
The Great Northern Railway had resigned itself to reaching York via Knottingley over the Lancashire and Yorkshire Railway and the York and North Midland Railway; the Y&NMR had merged with others in 1854 to form the North Eastern Railway. The NER obtained powers on 23 June 1864 to construct a direct line from York through Selby to a junction with the GNR at Shaftholme junction, a quarter mile south of the end-on Askern junction. This spot became very well known later as the northern extremity of the GNR on the line to York. (Note: Of course the GNR lines in the Leeds and Bradford area, and some branches, are considerably further north.) An agreement had been signed with the GNR on the previous 15 March, which arranged for the NER to have running powers from Askern to Doncaster. The GNR received running powers over the new route, and it was agreed that there should be no competition. Four GNR engines were to be out-stationed at York, and two NER engines at Doncaster. The NER opened the line on 2 January 1871, and the GNR transferred its expresses and some slower trains to the new route, with a significant saving in journey time.

== Dewsbury ==
The Ossett and Batley line passed Dewsbury by, and the GNR decided to make a new line connecting Dewsbury into the system. A new line was opened to a temporary Dewsbury terminus station on 1 May 1874 (goods) and 9 September (passengers). A passenger service of 14 trains each way on weekdays and five each way on Sundays ran between Wakefield and Dewsbury. The intention had been to continue construction from Dewsbury to Batley, but the money market became very difficult, and the work was delayed. The line opened on 12 April 1880; there was a new through station at Dewsbury, and the temporary terminus became a goods station.

== Halifax and Ovenden Joint Line ==
In the 1870s a scheme was put forward independently for a line from Halifax to Keighley. The terrain was exceptionally difficult, and because of concerns about practicality, the project was drastically cut back in Parliament to a short line from Halifax to Ovenden. This was made jointly with the Lancashire and Yorkshire Railway, and opened to goods traffic in 1874, and to passengers in 1879. In 1884 another very ambitious scheme was put forward for a line from Huddersfield to join a planned Hull and Barnsley Railway station in Halifax, and to run to the St Paul's district of the town. The Huddersfield connection was considered to be unaffordable, but the Halifax High Level Railway opened in 1890 connecting a new St Paul's station with Holmfield. In 1894 the company was absorbed by the GNR and L&YR jointly, and the line was managed in common with the Halifax and Ovenden Joint Line.

== Shipley branch ==
Bradford was a rapidly growing commercial conurbation, and residential travel facilities were in demand. In addition there were extensive mineral extraction activities between Bradford and Shipley, as well as offshoots of the textile industry. In 1866 the Bradford, Eccleshill and Idle Railway was authorised, and perhaps as an afterthought, the Idle and Shipley Railway was authorised in 1867, together forming a through line from Laisterdyke, forming a triangular junction there, immediately east of Bradford, to a connection with the Midland Railway at Shipley. In 1871 the Great Northern Railway took over the powers as financial difficulties had frustrated the two smaller companies' attempts to construct. The GNR itself delayed, but the line opened in stages from 1873 to 1875. The line was steeply graded, but nevertheless handled good volumes of goods and mineral traffic as well as a frequent passenger service.

== Queensbury lines ==
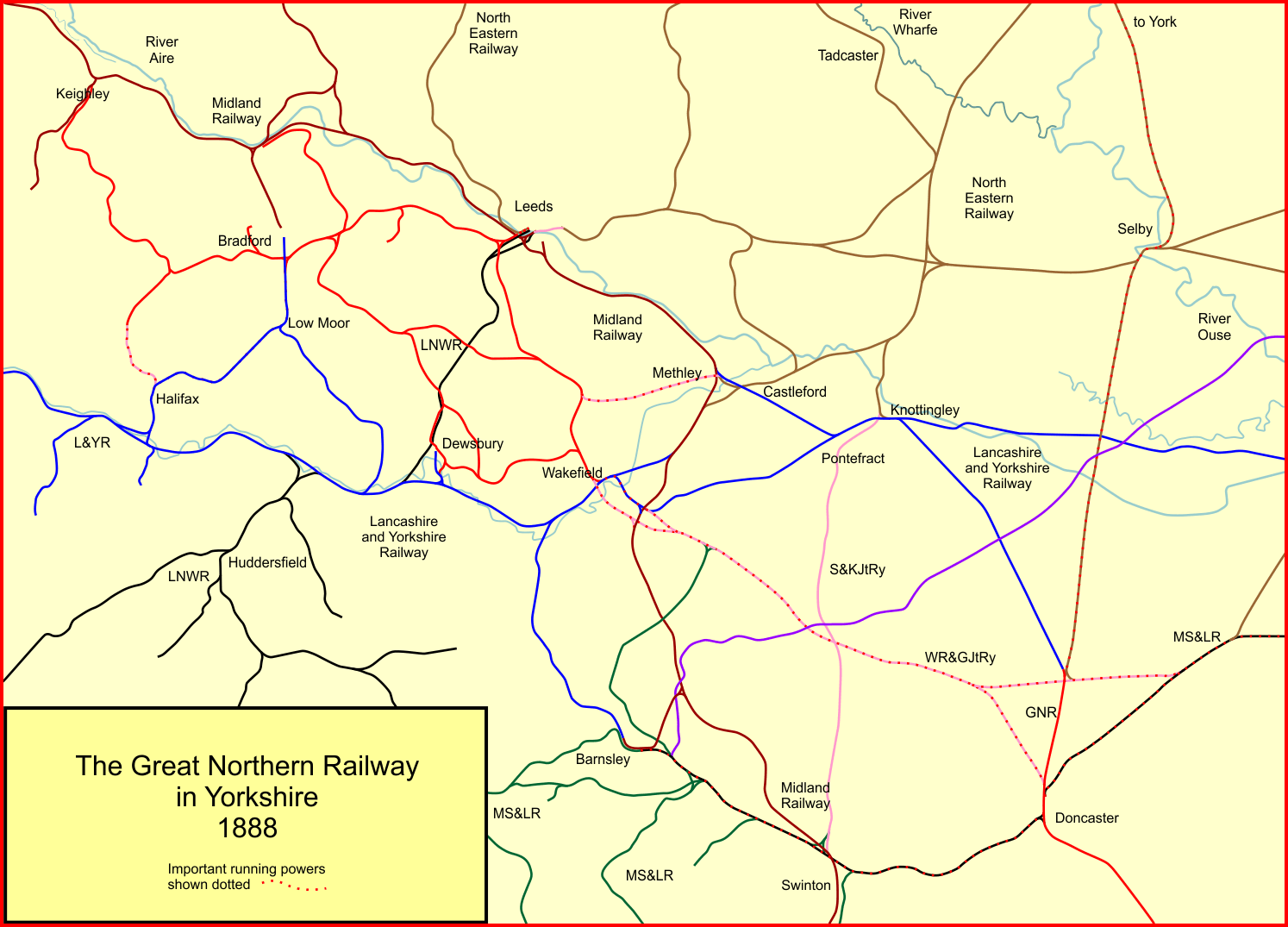
The GNR system in Yorkshire in 1888

The Great Northern Railway built a group of railways in the area west of Bradford, north of Halifax and south of Keighley. The terrain was hilly and exceptionally difficult for railways, but there was industry in the districts, originally attracted by the availability of coal deposits that were now nearing exhaustion. The Great Northern Railway felt impelled to build in this region, largely for fear that the Midland Railway might do so, gaining access to GNR territory.

Two railways were proposed independently, but both became sponsored by the GNR. The first was the Bradford and Thornton Railway, which made a triangular junction with the GNR Bowling line at Bradford, and ran via Queensbury to Thornton. It opened progressively from 1876. The Halifax, Thornton and Keighley Railway was next, connecting Holmfield, the northern extremity of the Halifax and Ovenden line, with Queensbury, where it made a triangular junction with the Bradford and Thornton Railway. In addition, it built on from Thornton to Keighley. These lines opened in stages between 1876 and 1884. The construction cost had been huge, and although business was encouraging, the line never paid for the first cost.

== Pudsey loop line ==
When the Leeds, Bradford and Halifax Junction Railway had built its main line, it ran north of Pudsey, to avoid the difficult topography there. Pudsey was a large and growing industrial town, and eventually the GNR were pressured to connect it to the network. A line from Stanningley was opened in 1878 with a frequent shuttle train service. This was still unsatisfactory to local people, and in 1882 there was a rapprochement with the Lancashire and Yorkshire Railway, which encouraged thoughts of establishing a new connection to Low Moor. In 1885 an Act was granted for an extension of the Pudsey loop line to the west to enhance the junctions near Laisterdyke, and connect the line towards Low Moor. At the east end the connection near Stanningley was to be reversed to allow direct running from Bramley through Pudsey to Bradford or Low Moor. This arrangement was inaugurated in December 1893, and enabled a long circular service from Leeds back to Leeds by way of this line and the L&YR Spen Valley line.

== East and West Yorkshire Union Railways ==
The East and West Yorkshire Union Railways was sponsored by the Hull and Barnsley Railway, which hoped to get access over it to Leeds for passenger traffic. In fact the company never raised enough money, and its network was confined to colliery and quarry connections in the area around Rothwell, south-east of Leeds. It opened in 1890 and in 1904 attempted a passenger service from Rothwell over the Midland Railway to Leeds. The service was commercially unsuccessful and was soon discontinued. The line brought considerable volumes of coal to the GNR at Lofthouse Junction, but it remained independent until the Grouping of 1923.

== Hunslet Railway ==
In the 1880s the Hunslet district of Leeds was experiencing considerable industrial growth. Proposed independently, the Hunslet Railway was authorised to build a line from Beeston to Hunslet, and the GNR adopted the authorisation. After some delay it was opened in 1899, by which time the North Eastern Railway had built its own branch to Hunslet. There were exchange sidings but no through running; passengers were never carried.

== South Yorkshire Joint Railway ==
The relatively shallow coal measures of the Yorkshire coalfield were becoming worked out, and in the first years of the twentieth century newer, much deeper, coal resources were being sought. When these became available, they needed rail access to transport the mineral to market, and after an initial period of disagreement, it emerged that a single jointly owned and operated railway was appropriate to serve the district. The result was the South Yorkshire Joint Railway, jointly owned by the Great Central Railway, the Midland Railway, the North Eastern Railway, the Lancashire and Yorkshire Railway and the Great Northern Railway. The main line started from Kirk Sandall Junction, not far short of Stainforth where the West Riding and Grimsby Joint Line met the Doncaster to Goole line. It ran through Dinnington to Brancliffe Junctions, near Shireoaks on the Sheffield to Retford line. It was about 17 miles long, having been authorised in 1902, and opened in 1909. Naturally the dominant traffic was coal, but passengers were carried from 1910.

== The Grouping, and after ==
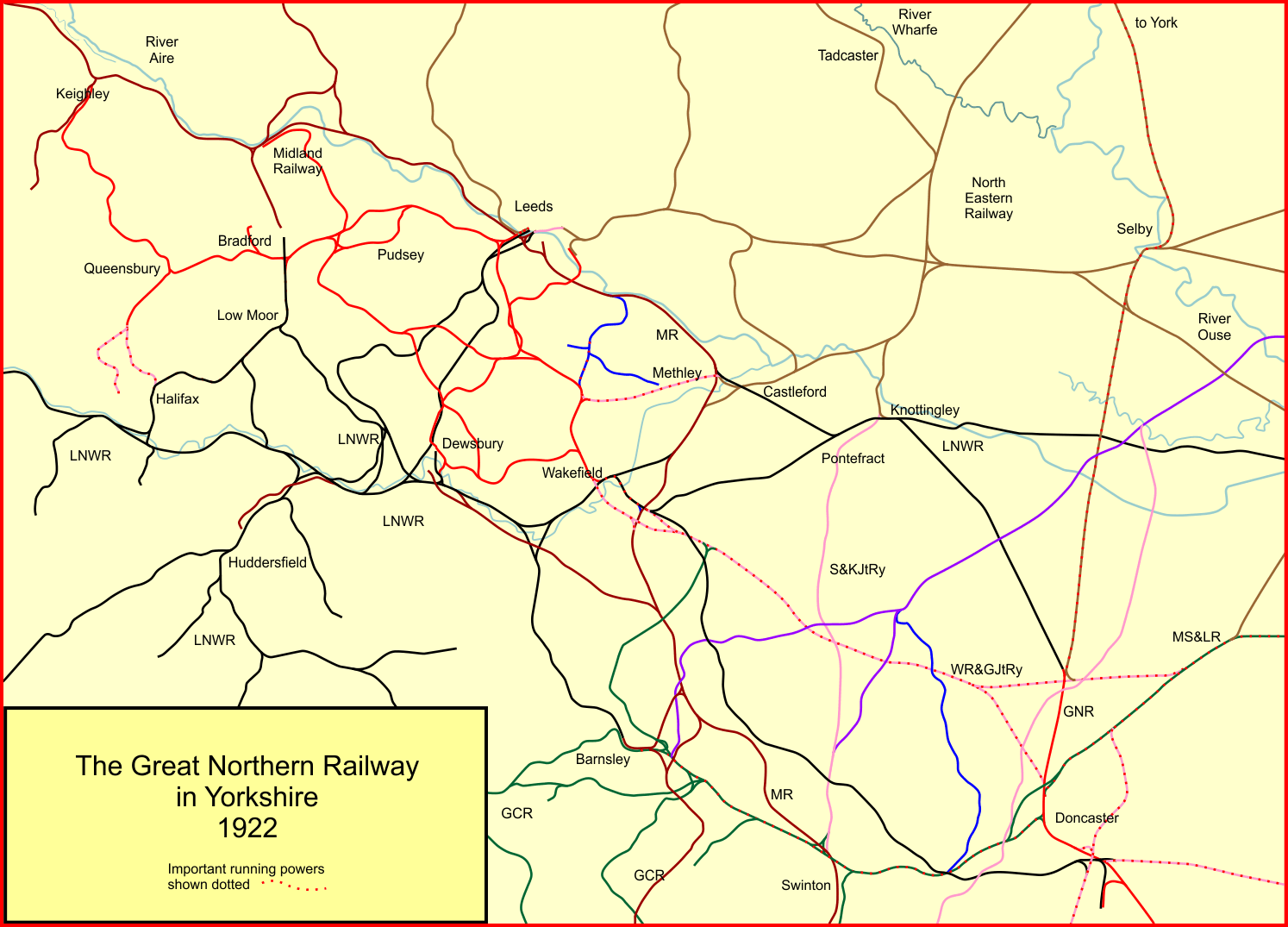
The GNR system in Yorkshire in 1922

The Railways Act 1921 determined that most of the railways of Great Britain would be reorganised into one or other of four new large companies, in a process known as the "grouping". The Great Northern Railway was to be a constituent of the new London and North Eastern Railway, the LNER. Some of the GNR's partners went with it, into the same group: the North Eastern Railway and the North British Railway, together forming the East Coast Main Line; and the Great Central Railway and the Hull and Barnsley Railway. The Great Eastern Railway also joined the LNER.

Many of the secondary lines in Yorkshire were paralleled by companies that joined a rival company, the London Midland and Scottish Railway, LMS. Thus the Lancashire and Yorkshire Railway, and the Midland Railway were constituents of the LMS. Joint lines that were joint between companies in different groups remained joint, now between the LNER and the LMS.

The competition for London to Scotland traffic, for haulage of coal from the Yorkshire coalfields to the south, and locally on many lines within Yorkshire, therefore continued. Electric tram competition in urban areas had already hit railway carryings hard; motor bus services were generally still in the future, but in time would seriously wound many rural passenger services. As roads were improved, partly funded by local authority rates levied on the railways, motor lorries would also abstract business from goods trains. The bright spots of the best long-distance trains would be further improved under the LNER, and may be considered to be continuing to improve in the present day.

== The present day ==
Most of the former GNR branch lines in Yorkshire have been closed. The East Coast Main Line is a busy passenger and freight railway using the GNR route from London to Shaftholme Junction, and to Leeds. (Note: Leeds Central station has been closed.) The old GNR route from Leeds to Mill Street Junction, just outside the current Bradford Interchange station, is in use as an important secondary passenger route.
