= Methley railway station =

Disused railway station in West Yorkshire, England

Methley North
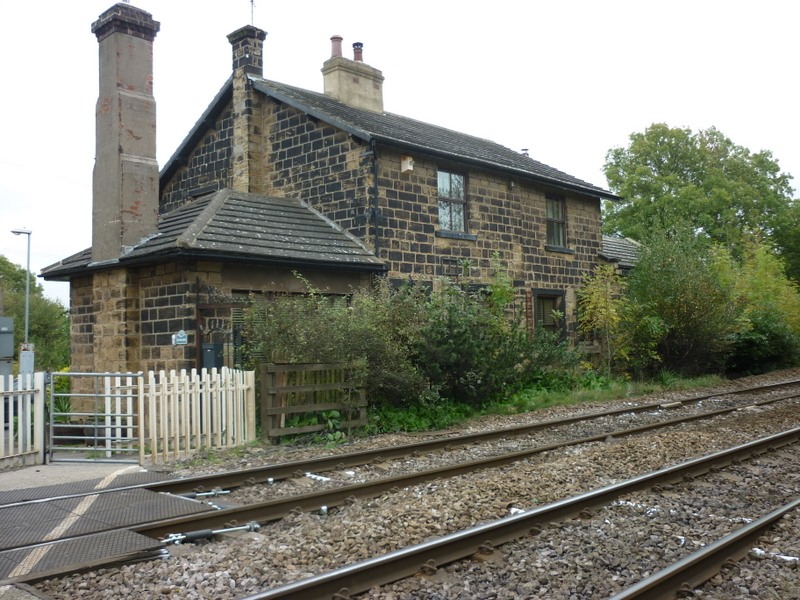
- Station house (2010)

General information
- Location: Methley, City of Leeds; England
- Coordinates: 53.740790°N 1.414740°W
- Grid reference: SE387273

Other information
- Status: Disused

History
- Original company: North Midland Railway
- Pre-grouping: Midland Railway
- Post-grouping: London, Midland and Scottish Railway

Key dates
- 1 April 1841: Station opened as Methley
- 25 September 1950: renamed Methley North
- 16 September 1957: Station closed
Location

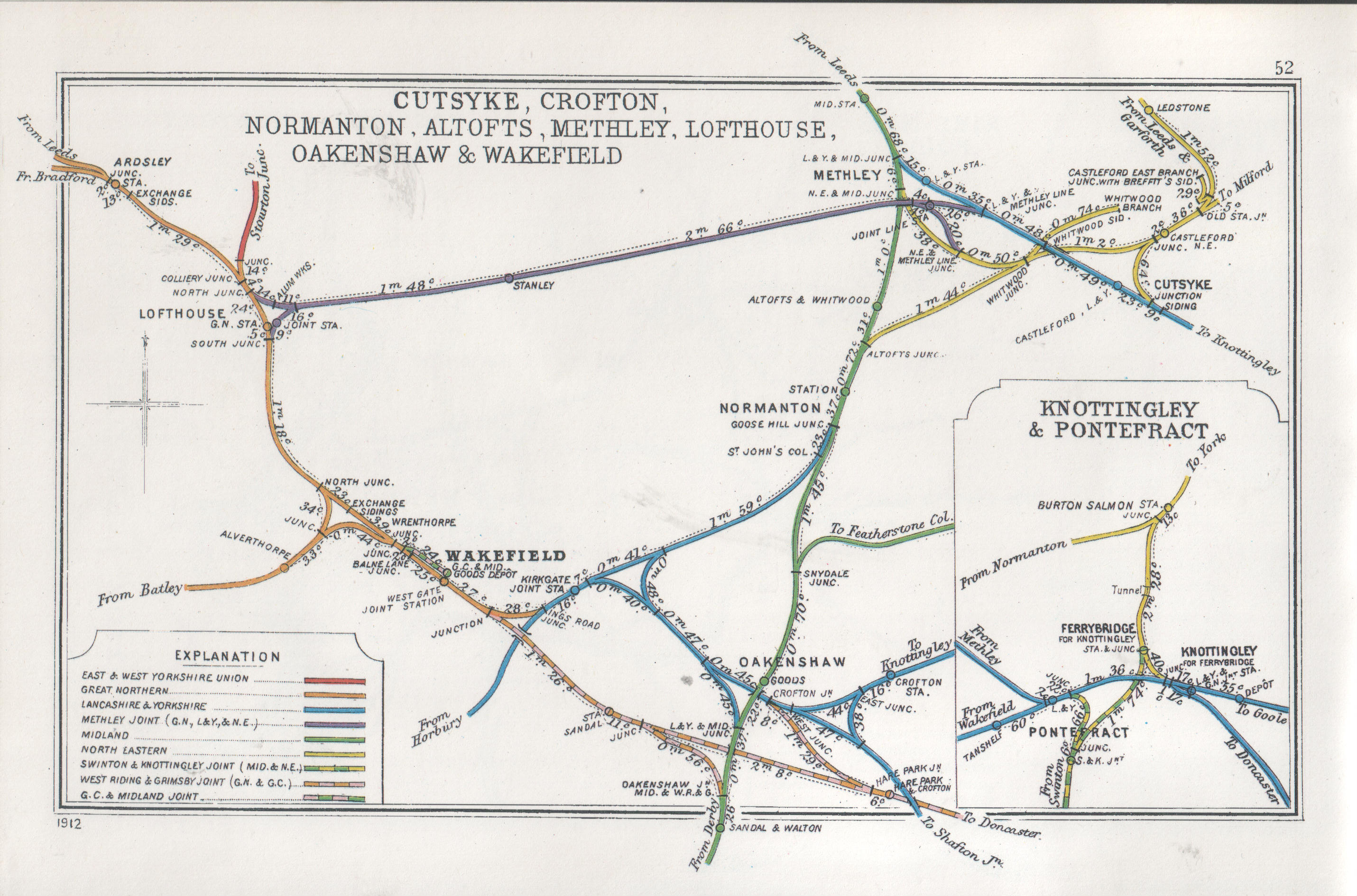
A Railway Clearing House map of lines around Methley and Wakefield in 1912.

Methley railway station was opened in 1841 by the North Midland Railway on its line from Derby to Leeds. At one time, there were three railway stations in Methley and in 1950, British Railways renamed it Methley North. It closed in 1957.

Slightly to the south, the Lancashire and Yorkshire Railway made a north-facing junction of its line from Knottingley and it built its own station (Methley Junction). This station opened on 1 October 1849 and closed on 4 October 1943.

A third station was built by the Methley Joint Railway, a line in which the L&YR, the GNR and the NER were shareholders. This station, opened on 1 May 1869, known as Methley Joint station was closed as Methley South on 7 March 1960.

Preceding station	Historical railways	Following station
Altofts and Whitwood; Line open; station closed	North Midland Railway; Midland Railway	Woodlesford; Line open; station open
