= Woodlesford railway station =

Railway station in West Yorkshire, England

Woodlesford
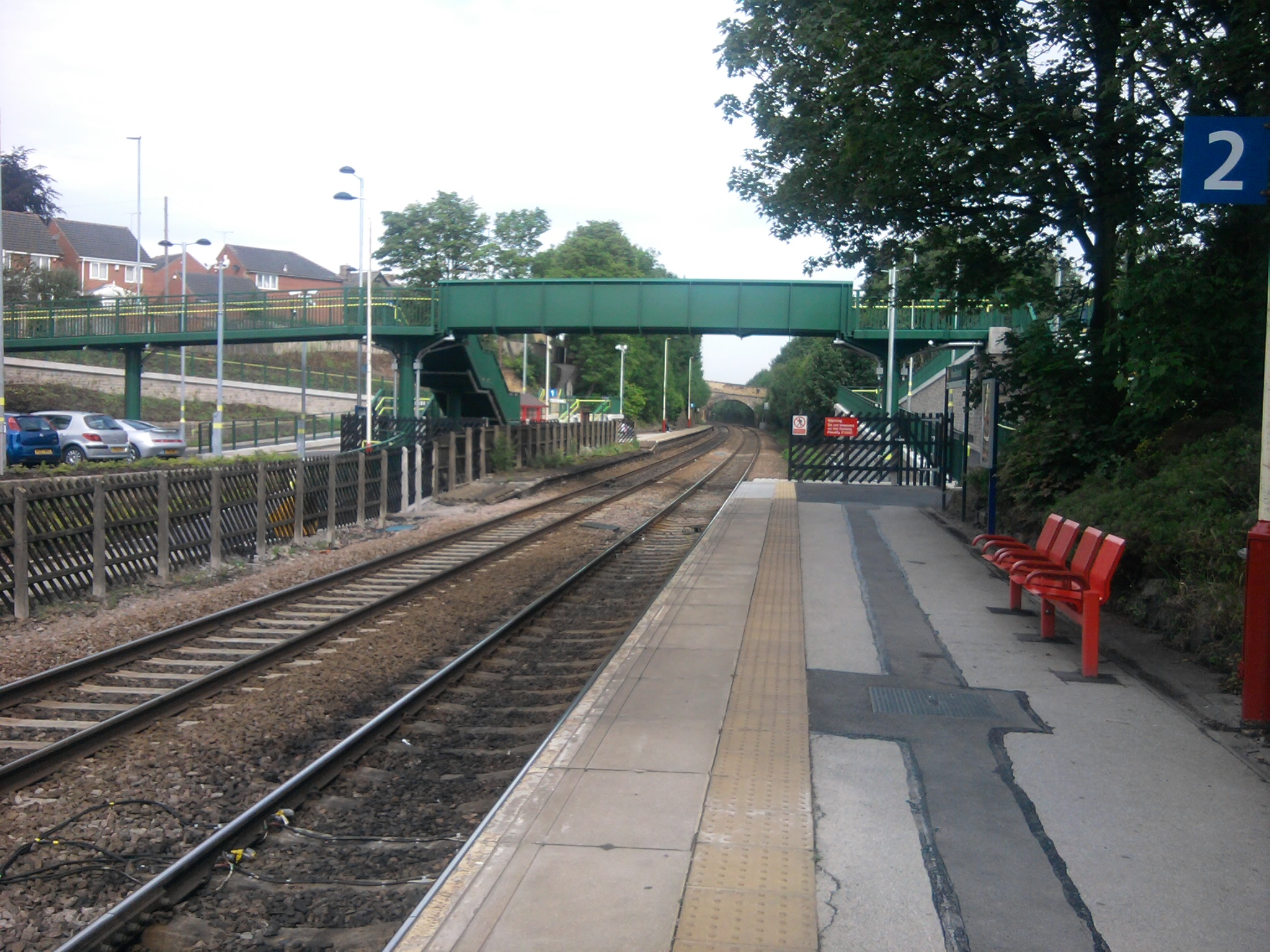
- Platform 2 in 2011, with the new footbridge from platform 1

General information
- Location: Woodlesford, City of Leeds; England
- Coordinates: 53.7570°N 1.4435°W
- Grid reference: SE368290
- Managed by: Northern
- Transit authority: West Yorkshire Metro
- Platforms: 2

Other information
- Station code: WDS
- Fare zone: 2
- Classification: DfT category F1

History
- Opened: 1 July 1840

Passengers
- 2020/21: ▼54,774
- 2021/22: ▲0.165 million
- 2022/23: ▲0.203 million
- 2023/24: ▲0.220 million
- 2024/25: ▲0.259 million
Location
Notes
- Passenger statistics from the Office of Rail and Road

Woodlesford railway station serves the suburban village of Woodlesford and the town of Rothwell in West Yorkshire, England. It lies on the Hallam Line and the Pontefract Line, 6 miles (9.7 km) south of Leeds.

== Facilities ==
The station is unstaffed, but a self-service ticket machine is provided to allow passengers to buy before travelling or collect advance purchase tickets. The platforms are staggered either side of the (now disused) foot crossing, with the Leeds-bound platform the more northerly of the two. Waiting shelters, timetable posters and digital CIS displays are provided on each platform, with automated announcements also offered to give train running information. Step-free access is available to both platforms (via the ramps on the footbridge for platform 2).

== Service ==
Monday to Saturdays there is a half-hourly service to Leeds and an hourly service to Sheffield on the Hallam Line and hourly towards Knottingley on the Pontefract Line. A single through train to Goole runs in the evening.

Sundays, there is an hourly service to Leeds and train every two hours to Sheffield and Knottingley respectively.

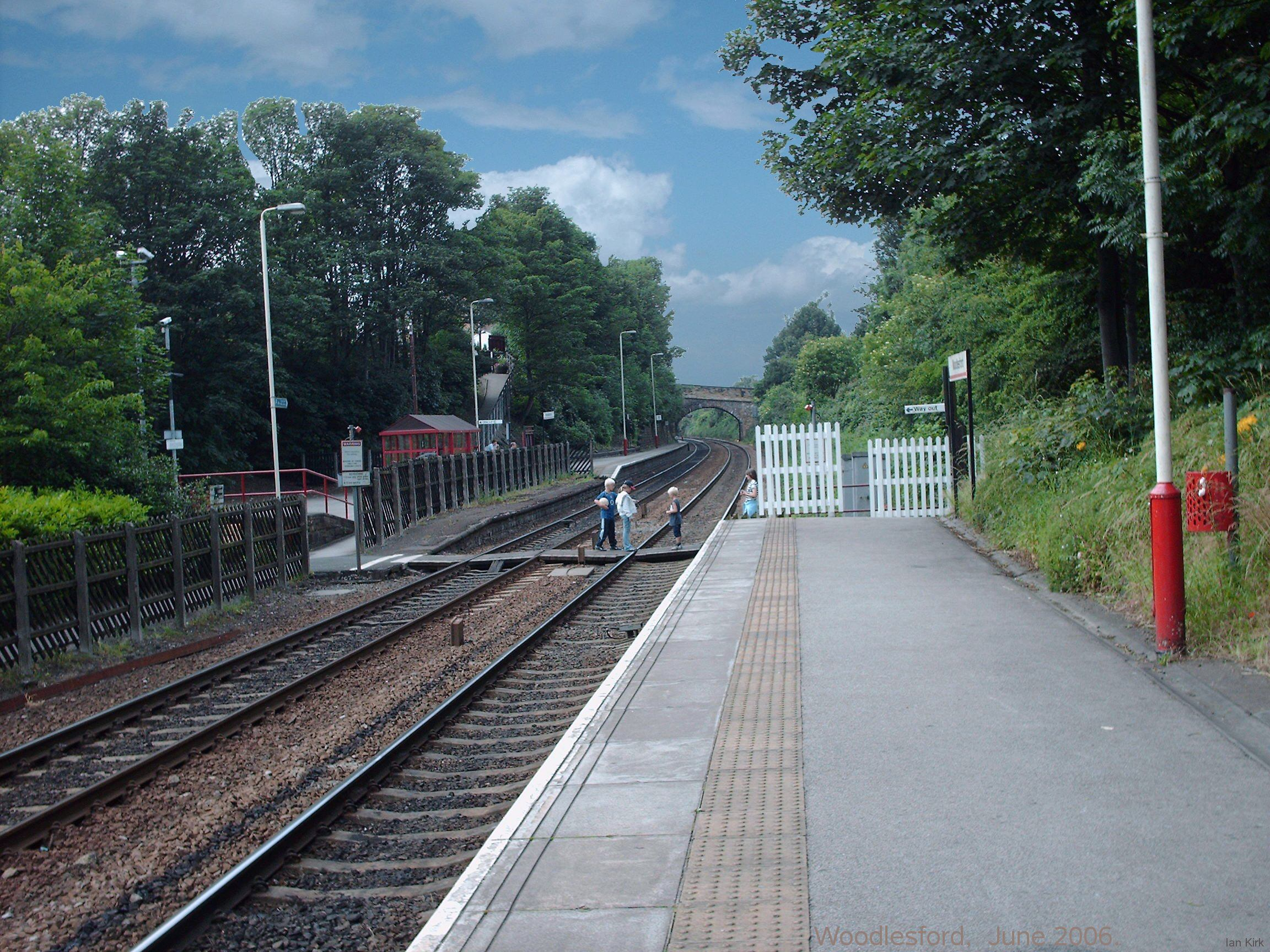
The view from platform 2 in June 2006. The pedestrian crossing was replaced by a new footbridge in 2010.

== History ==
The station was opened on 1 July 1840 and formed part of the original North Midland Railway from Derby to Leeds built by George Stephenson. During the early 20th century, coal trains from the nearby Water Haigh colliery provided regular goods traffic, as did the Armitage Quarries and Bentley's Yorkshire Brewery which had their own sidings. Parcels headed for the nearby town of Rothwell were unloaded here.

For much of its life, the station had a Midland Railway building on the northbound platform that housed the booking hall, waiting room and station master's office, along with a signal box (dating from 1899) at the end of the southbound platform. Both were demolished in the early 1970s - the former in 1971 (after the station had been downgraded to an unstaffed halt the previous year) and the latter after its abolition in January 1972.

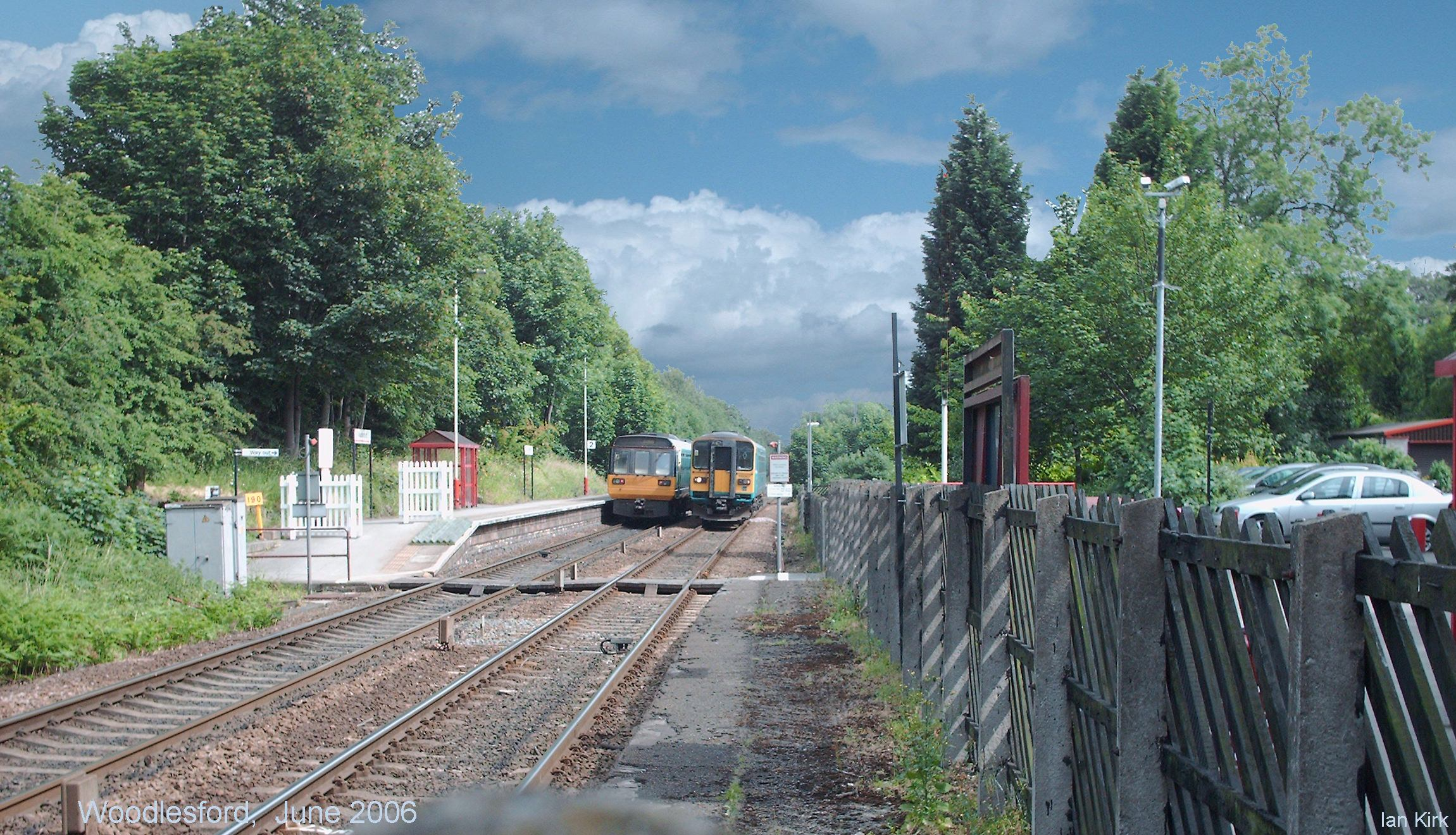
Platform 2 seen from the end of platform 1 in June 2006 prior to the construction of the footbridge

In late 2010 a footbridge was erected at the station to replace the crossing.

== Accidents and incidents ==
In 1850, a train was in a rear-end collision with an excursion train at the station. The cause was a signal not being lit at night.

Preceding station	National Rail	Following station
Castleford	Northern Hallam Line	Leeds
Castleford	Northern Pontefract Line	Leeds
	Historical railways	
Methley; Line open; station closed	North Midland Railway; Midland Railway	Leeds City; Line open; station open
