= Methley Joint Railway =

Former railway line in Yorkshire, England

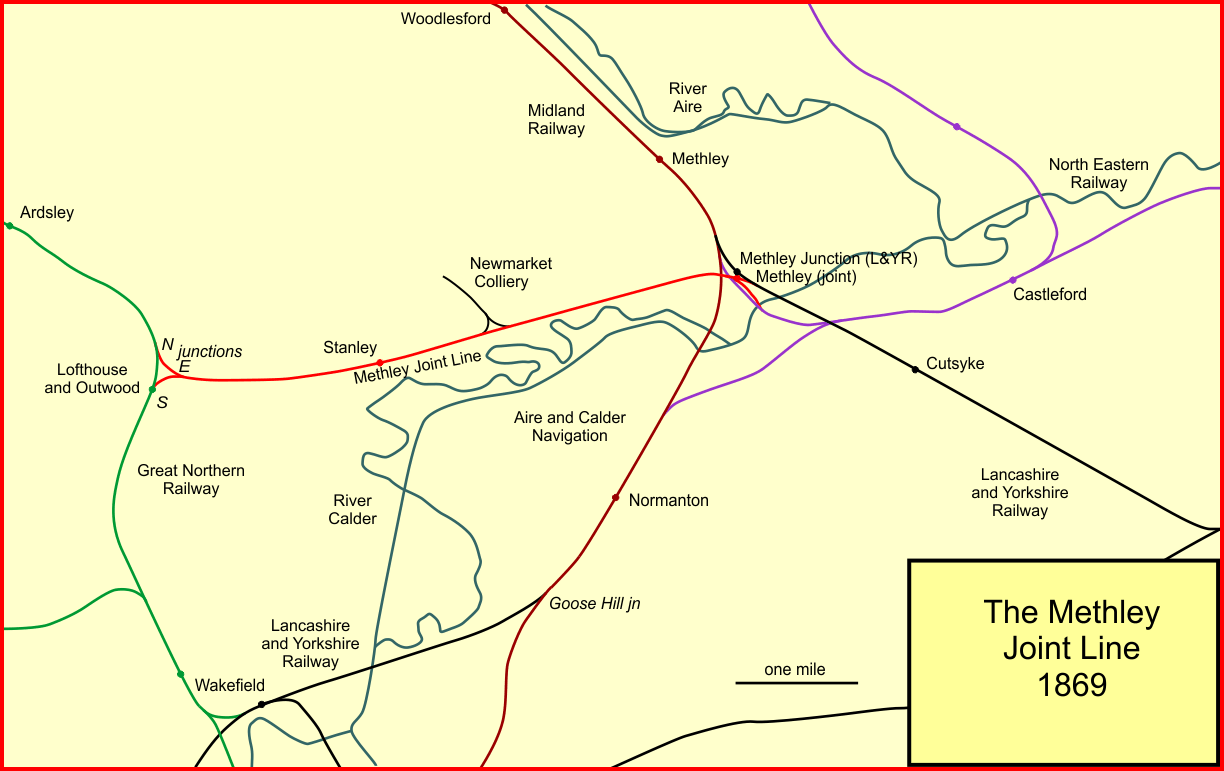
The Methley joint line

The Methley Joint Railway (or Methley joint line) was a short English railway line constructed by the Bradford, Wakefield and Leeds Railway company, connecting its Leeds direction line with other companies' eastward routes to York, the north-east, and Goole. The line connected collieries along its route. The BW&LR changed its name to the West Yorkshire Railway at the same time. The line was double track, just over five miles in length, between junctions at Lofthouse and Methley.

The connected Lancashire and Yorkshire Railway and the North Eastern Railway were brought in to joint ownership of the line in 1864, and the line opened in 1865; passenger traffic was delayed, starting in 1869.

A variety of passenger train services operated over the route, but the line closed to passenger trains in 1964, and completely in 1981.

== Origin ==
The Bradford, Wakefield and Leeds Railway had opened in 1857, forming a link between Wakefield and Leeds. It was worked by the Great Northern Railway, and gave that company a much improved access to Leeds.

Although worked by the GNR, the company took the initiative in seeking extensions to its network, and in the 1863 session of Parliament the BW&LR sought powers for a branch from Lofthouse to Methley and another to Low Moor, and to change its name to the West Yorkshire Railway. The Lofthouse to Methley branch and change of title were sanctioned by the West Yorkshire Railway Act 1863 (26 & 27 Vict. c. clxvii) of 21 July 1863, but the Low Moor branch was rejected. The act also authorised running powers over the North Eastern Railway from Methley to Castleford (and towards York) and over the Lancashire and Yorkshire Railway from Pontefract to Leeds.

The L&YR and the North Eastern Railway had strongly resisted the authorisation of the line, but an agreement was made with those companies to admit them to joint ownership of the line, in return for their not opposing the absorption of the Leeds, Bradford and Halifax Junction Railway and the Bradford, Wakefield and Leeds Railway by the GNR.

Methley Railway Act 1864
- Act of Parliament
- Parliament of the United Kingdom
- Long title: An Act to give Effect to the Provisions of "The West Yorkshire Railway Act, 1863," with reference to the Admission of the North-eastern and Lancashire and Yorkshire Railway Companies to become joint Owners with the West Yorkshire Railway Company of the Methley Railway; and for other Purposes.
- Citation: 27 & 28 Vict. c. lv

Dates
- Royal assent: 23 June 1864

Other legislation
- Relates to: West Yorkshire Railway Act 1863

By the Methley Railway Act 1864 (27 & 28 Vict. c. lv) of 23 June 1864, the Methley Railway (as the branch had now been named) transferred to the joint ownership of the West Yorkshire Railway (former BW&LR), L&YR, and NER. The L&YR and the NER subscribed £25,000 of capital each, so that the joint line capital of £75,000 was equally shared. A Methley Joint Committee was set up, each company appointing two directors: the first meeting was on 8 August 1864. Stations were to be at Stanley and Methley, also at Lofthouse, (at the junction with the main line). In addition, sidings were provided at Lofthouse Alum Works, and at several collieries; the line was double track. A fixed toll on all traffic would be paid into a joint fund. Up to 18 March 1867 each company had subscribed £34,500 for the joint line.

The railway diverged from the West Yorkshire Railway at Lofthouse [North] junction; at first the access was from the north alone. The line was 5 miles 3 chains (8.1 km) long, and joined the former York and North Midland Railway line (now North Eastern Railway) at Methley Joint Line junction. At Methley High Level junction, close to the eastern extremity of the line, it bifurcated, platforms being provided on both forks at Methley station, and a 30 chain spur connected with the L&YR at a junction at Methley named Lofthouse junction.

== Opening and operation ==
The double track line needed three Board of Trade inspections before it was approved, in 1865. On 19 September it was passed for passenger traffic. Goods traffic was begun in June or August 1865. The GNR's account for working the line for the first half of 1867 was £510. The NER stated that the charges were 20% too high, to which the GNR retorted that if the NER desired to work the line for 20% less it was welcome to do so. Passenger operation was delayed despite agitation from the local population: it was not until 1 June 1869 that a passenger service was run. Lofthouse South fork was not in regular passenger use in its early years.

Platforms were provided at Methley on the fork to Lofthouse Junction (L&YR), but no regular passenger service appears to have used them.

== WYR absorbed by the Great Northern Railway ==
The West Yorkshire Railway (formerly Bradford, Wakefield and Leeds Railway) was absorbed by the Great Northern Railway, effective from 1 January 1865. This was confirmed by the West Yorkshire Railway Act 1865 (28 & 29 Vict. c. cclxxv) of 5 July, and the one third share of the Methley Joint line passed to the GNR from 5 September 1865.

The GNR soon obtaining running powers over the NER as far as Milford junction, and started a goods service to that point from Bradford on 8 June 1866.

== Train services ==
The GNR began running a passenger service over the joint line from 1 May 1869, and from 13 May GNR trains started to work through to the NER station at Castleford from both Wakefield and Leeds. In reply the Midland Railway commenced a Leeds-Castleford service on 1 August, but despite the more direct route it was soon taken off. An even shorter-lived experiment was a through GNR service from Bradford to York via the Methley Joint Line, which was operated only in the summers of 1876 and 1877. The Methley Joint station at Methley was the third in this locality, its nearest namesake being Methley Junction on the L&YR Pontefract line. At its eastern end the MJR crossed the floodplain of the River Calder, and inundation of the tracks was a perpetual hazard; in 1892 it was recommended that the line be lifted by as much as four feet for a length of 500 yards.

By an agreement of 20 October 1870, the GNR was allowed 33% of gross receipts for working the Methley Joint passenger service, altered on 1 January 1885 to 1s per mile for "all trains necessary to the branch". Several new collieries were opened along it and suitable sidings put in.

== Infrastructure changes ==
The signalling was altered for interlocking in preparation for installation of the block system, ready for two new services beginning on 1 May 1876. A south curve at Lofthouse, making a triangular junction there, and a new joint station were brought into use on 1 May 1876. Lofthouse Joint station was built on the curve, and was located on a 1 in 90 gradient. The station and curve carried a service of six trains each way on weekdays and two on Sundays between Wakefield (Kirkgate) and Milford Junction via Methley.

Lofthouse Joint station was renamed Lofthouse in the February 1881 timetable, and again renamed Lofthouse & Outwood in July 1888.

After the withdrawal of the North Eastern Railway York to Leeds service via Methley, the portion of the Methley branch between Methley Joint Junction and Methley Junction fell into disuse for passenger services, but the track was not removed until 1943. On 4 October of that year the Methley Junction L&YR station was closed.

== After 1923 ==
At the grouping of 1923 the line passed to the joint ownership of the LMS and the LNER.

The passenger service using the Lofthouse south curve was discontinued from 17 June 1957.

On 5 May 1958 diesel multiple unit trains began working from Leeds Central over the Methley Joint Line into Castleford Central (as the NER station had been renamed), and then continued to Pontefract. This service was discontinued from 2 November 1964, when the Methley Joint Line was closed to all passenger traffic.

The western end of the line from Lofthouse junctions to Newmarket (Silkstone) Colliery was closed completely from 5 April 1965; the colliery traffic was accessible to and from the Methley end only; the connection at Methley to the L&YR was closed from 27 March 1967, leaving only the route to the former NER line.

The line closed completely on 23 February 1981.

== Locations ==
=== Main line ===
- Lofthouse South Junction; on BW&LR;
- Lofthouse Joint station; opened 1 June 1869; renamed Lofthouse 1881; renamed Lofthouse and Outwood 1888; closed 1957;
- Lofthouse East Junction;
- Stanley; opened 1 May 1869; closed 2 November 1964;
- Newmarket Colliery West Junction;
- Newmarket Colliery East Junction;
- Methley South Junction;
- Methley NE Junction.

=== North curve at Lofthouse ===
- Lofthouse North Junction;
- Lofthouse East Junction.

=== Connection to L&YR at Methley ===
- Methley South Junction;
- Methley; opened 1 May 1869; renamed Methley South 1951; closed 7 March 1960;
- Lofthouse Junction (at Methley) on L&YR.
