= Methley =

Village in West Yorkshire, England

Coordinates: 53.7349°N 1.4083°W

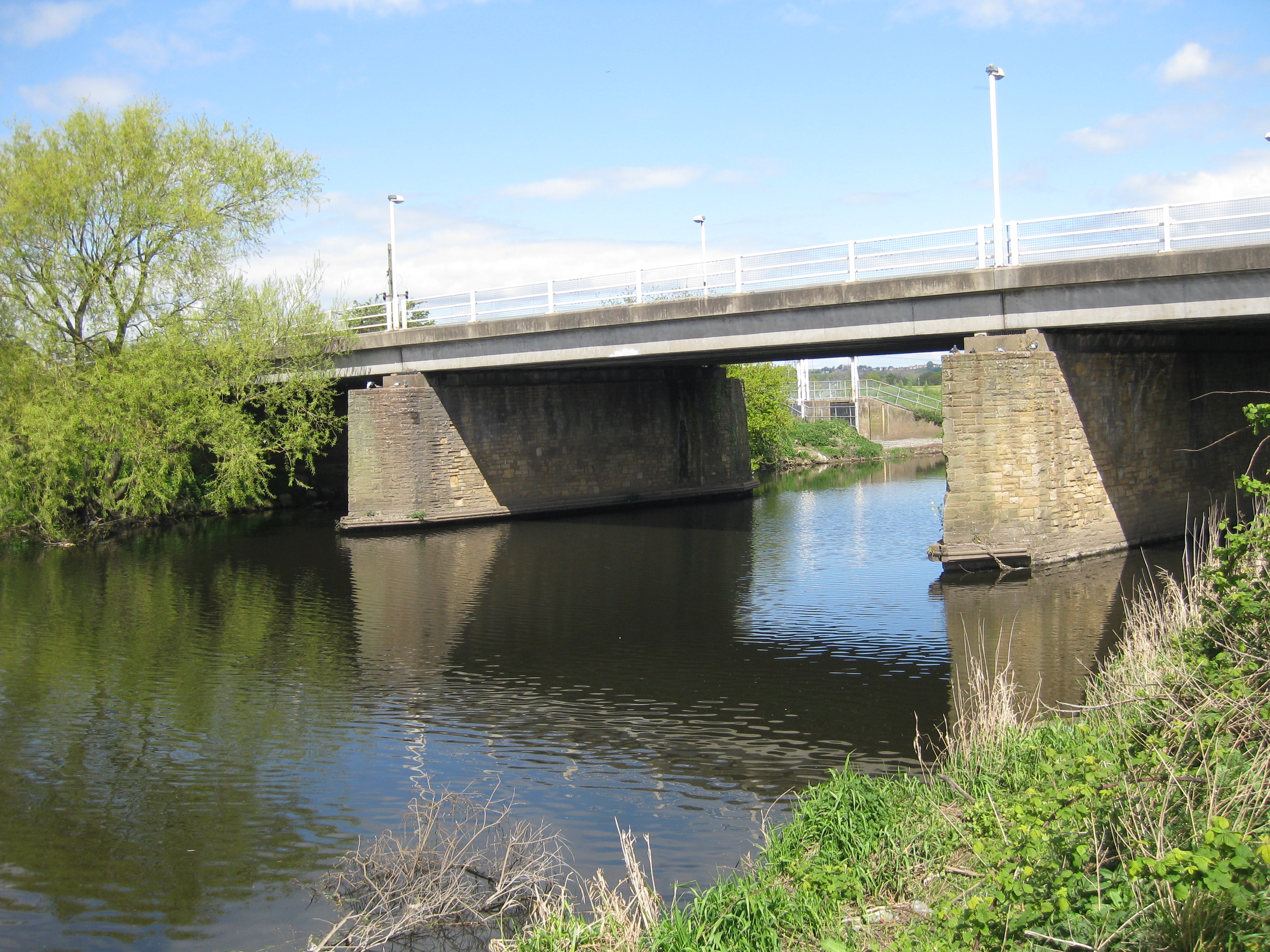
- Methley Bridge

- Location within West Yorkshire
- Metropolitan borough: City of Leeds
- Metropolitan county: West Yorkshire
- Region: Yorkshire and the Humber
- Country: England
- Sovereign state: United Kingdom
- Post town: LEEDS
- Postcode district: LS26
- Dialling code: 01977
- Police: West Yorkshire
- Fire: West Yorkshire
- Ambulance: Yorkshire

Methley is a dispersed village in the City of Leeds metropolitan borough, south east of Leeds, in West Yorkshire, England. It is located near Rothwell, Oulton, Woodlesford, Mickletown and Allerton Bywater. The Leeds City Ward is called Kippax and Methley. It is within the triangle formed by Leeds, Castleford and Wakefield, and between the confluence of the River Aire and River Calder. The latter is crossed by Methley Bridge, the A639 road, (grid reference SE409258) about a mile south-east of the village.

== Location and history ==
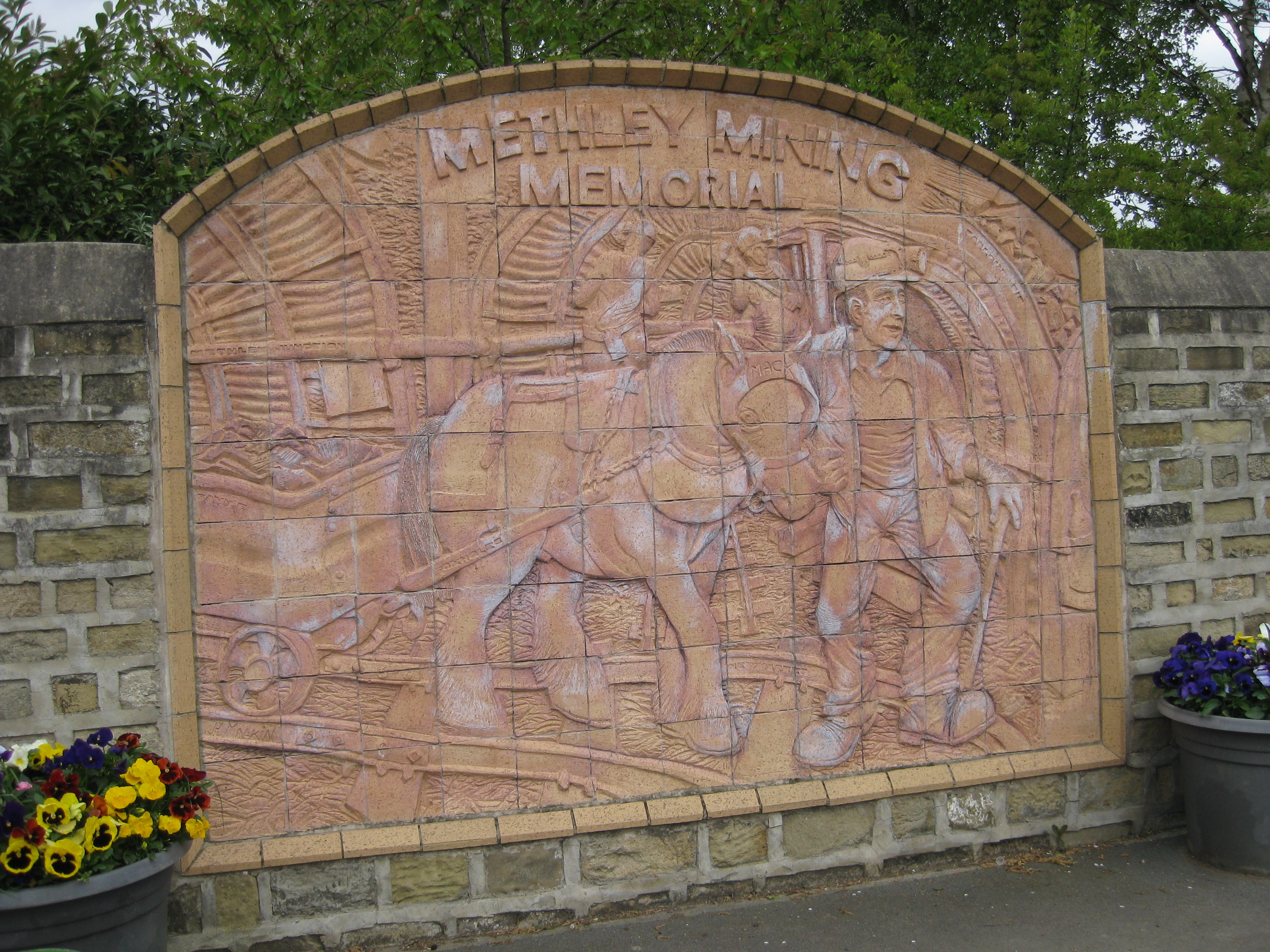
Mining Memorial, Main Street

The name Methley derives from either the Old English mǣðlēah meaning 'mowing wood or clearing'. Another theory is that it derives from the Old Norse meðal meaning 'middle', and the Old English ēg meaning 'island'.

Today, the village is often described in terms of the area around Church Lane, Main Street and Pinfold Lane. However, the buildings on these streets largely date from the 20th century – and this area does not represent the original geographical centre of the village. The original village was established near to Saint Oswald's Church, and in particular along Church Side. This is reflected in the 17th- and 18th-century buildings along Churchside and parts of Watergate. The village has a history of coal mining. At one stage there were five mines in operation in the village – Savile Colliery, Methley Junction, Foxholes (Scholey Hill), Newmarket, and Newmarket Silkstone. The last pit (Saville Colliery) closed in the mid-1980s.

Part of the village (the area south and west of the M62 motorway) was ceded to the City of Wakefield Metropolitan district council in the 1990s. This area, which includes the hamlets of Newmarket and Scholey Hill, was subject to a planning dispute regarding an industrial and leisure development as villagers feared increased traffic levels – particularly along the A642, B6135 (Newmarket Lane and Watergate), Park Lane and Churchside. Eric Pickles, the Secretary of State for Communities and Local Government approved the development on 21 June 2012. The new stadium for Wakefield Trinity Wildcats Rugby league club will form part of the development and should be completed by 2015.

Methley was in the wapentake of Agbrigg in the West Riding of Yorkshire in 1086. Methley was surveyed by the Tudor cartographer, Christopher Saxton, author of the first atlas of England (1577). However, the map is now lost.

In 1894 Methley became an urban district, on 1 April 1937 the district was abolished and merged with Rothwell Urban District and Castlefor Urban District. On 1 April 1937 the civil parish was abolished and merged with Rothwell and Castleford. In 1931 the parish had a population of 4607.

== Buildings ==
=== Methley Hall ===
Methley Hall was the former seat of the Earl of Mexborough. During the fourteenth century the de Waterton family married into the de Methley family and moved to Methley Hall, a large, imposing and solid castellated building, mostly spread over three storeys rising to four by the turreted entrance. An eighteenth century watercolour shows a great hall with a minstrels gallery and grand staircase, decorated and embossed ceiling with a full-length oriel window. Young Richard Plantagenet, Richard of York, lived here from the ages of four to twelve, with Waterton's family until 1423 when national events changed things. Robert Waterton was the custodian of Richard II whilst constable of Pontefract Castle from 1399 and later gaoler of James I of Scotland. He was esquire to Henry Bolingbroke, the future Henry IV. The seat at Methley Hall was conferred in 1410 to Robert's brother John Waterton. The Hall, which featured in a 1907 edition of Country Life, was demolished in 1964, although the Mexborough Estate are still significant landowners in the district. Queen Mary (Mary of Teck), consort of H. M. King George V, visited the village in 1935 and stayed at the Hall as a guest of the Earl. Titus Salt leased Methley Hall from the Earl of Mexborough between 1856 and 1865 according to Salt's biographer Balgarnie.

=== Church ===
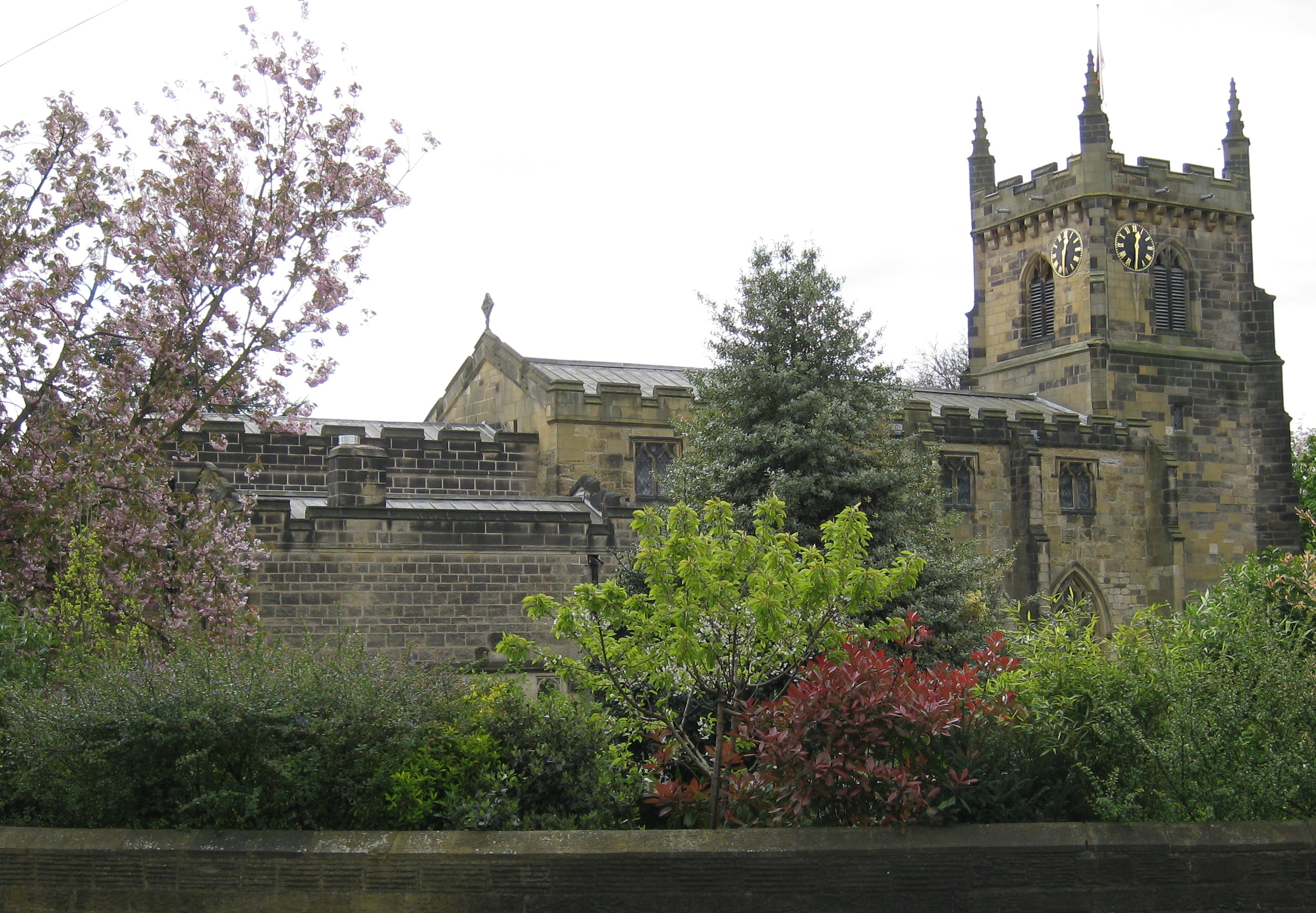
St Oswald's Church viewed from Church Side

The parish church Saint Oswald's is a 12th century Grade I listed building which had a spire from the mid-18th century to 1937. The spire became unsafe and was dismantled. The Castleford-born artist Henry Moore was a frequent visitor to the church. Nikolaus Pevsner documented the church and Methley Hall as part of his Buildings of England series in the late 1950s. Alan Bennett visited the church in December 1998 as mentioned in his collection of writings Untold Stories (2005), a visit which was filmed as part of a special The South Bank Show charting the writer's early life.

=== "Fatty Cake" School House ===
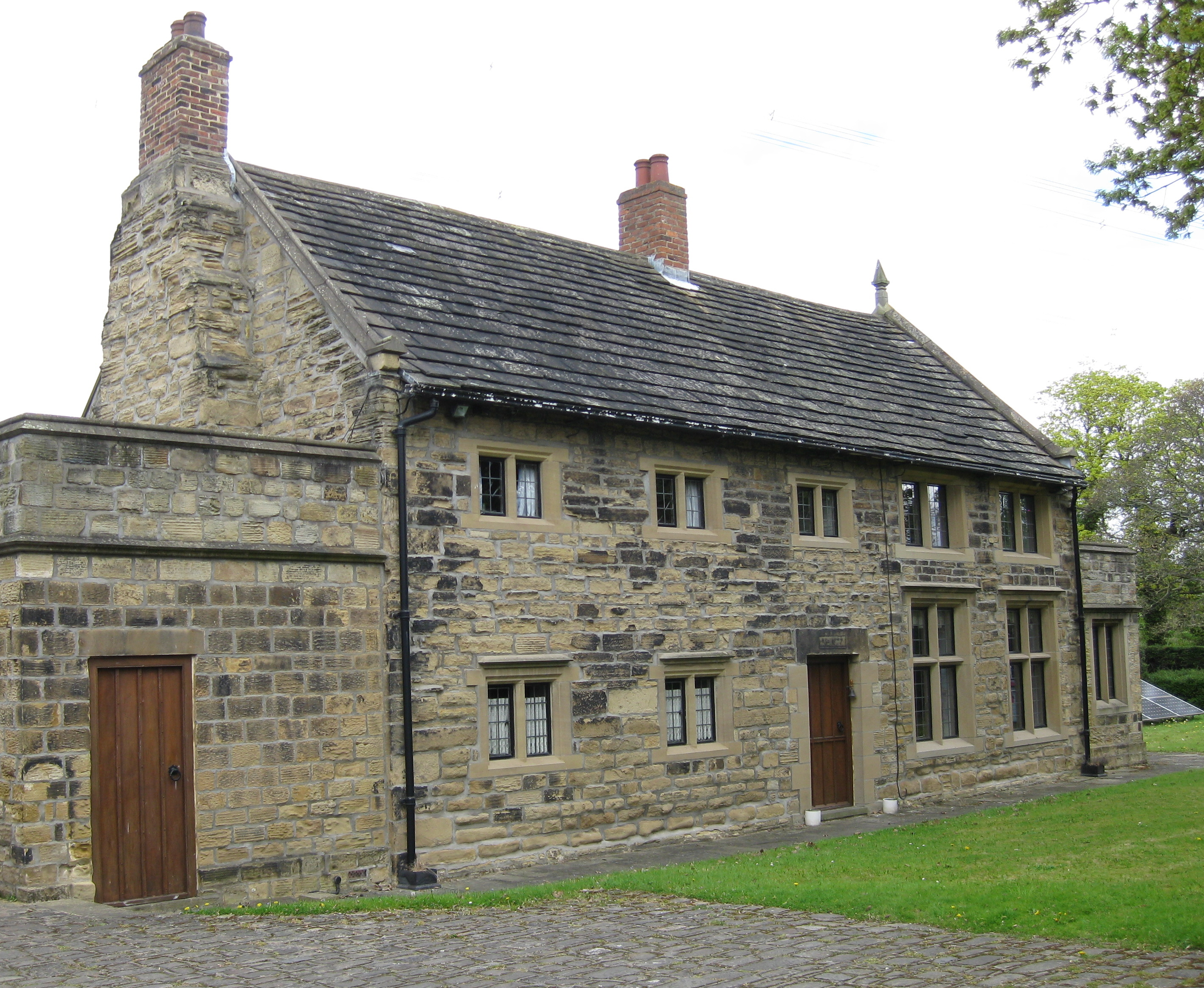
Former school on Watergate

The Old Pinder Green school house is a Grade II listed building dating from 1637 at the junction of Watergate and the main Leeds to Pontefract Road. The school closed in 1881 and became a private residence, now known as the Fatty Cake School House.

== Railway ==
Methley was once served by three railway stations: Methley North (closed 1957); Methley Junction (closed 1943); and Methley South (closed 1960). The original railway line through the village was built by the North Midland Railway in 1840 as part of the Derby to Leeds main line. This route now forms part of the Hallam (Leeds – Sheffield) and Pontefract Lines. The proposed route of the Birmingham to Leeds HS2 rail line would have passed to the west of the village between Scholey Hill, Clumpcliffe and Lemonroyd Lock, where it would have curved west at that point to take trains into Leeds city centre via Woodlesford. The line has now been axed and will not happen.

== Second World War POW camp ==
Methley was the site of a German POW camp during the Second World War. The camp was located on the north side of Park Lane near to The Lodge. The foundations of the POW huts are still visible on close inspection. POWs were used as agricultural labourers on the Mexborough Estate as many villagers had been recruited into the armed forces. The POWs were invited to perform Stille Nacht, Heilige Nacht (Silent Night) in German during a Christmas Eve service at St Oswald's Church – an event still remembered by some villagers.

The BBC Inside Out programme (5 December 2011) reported that Artur Braun, one of the inmates of the POW camp, produced a large painting (size 8 ft x 8 ft) entitled 'Our Lady of the ruins' during the winter of 1944–45. It featured the Madonna with child in a ruined city surrounded by desperate people appealing to God for protection from war. The painting is believed to depict the artist's wife (as the Madonna) in the ruins of the city of Freiburg im Breisgau in Baden-Württemberg, (Germany) (the painting clearly shows Freiburg Munster in the background). Braun may have produced the painting after hearing of the death of his wife during an allied air raid on Freiburg im Breisgau (Braun's home town) during November 1944. For many years the painting was owned by a convent in Lancashire, then was sold at auction in 1997.

== Local points of interest ==
The Yorkshire Imperial Band, formerly the Yorkshire Imperial Copperworks Band, used to rehearse in the village. The band, who have won the Champions of Great Britain title and three British Open titles, is one of the country's foremost brass bands and have produced recordings and performed concerts on the BBC.

The composer Edward Elgar was friends with the former owner (Mr. Embleton) of 'The Cedars' – now a residential home – and often stayed in the village. Nick Hodgson, drummer of the Leeds band the Kaiser Chiefs, has family connections with the village. The band officially opened the new village primary school on 16 January 2006. Other notable residents of the village have included Rugby league players Brian Lockwood, Dean Mountain, Daryl Powell, Ben Crooks, Kelvin Skerrett, Joe Arundel and footballer Paul Rickers..

Each year the village holds a Scarecrow Festival, a competition in which residents take part.

Methley Cricket Club won the Village Cup national competition at Lord's, in 1998. Yorkshire and Worcestershire player Matthew Waite, has represented Methley C.C.

Methley United A.F.C. (formerly Methley United JFC) are the local football club. The original village football club was Methley Perseverance F.C. Methley Welfare F.C. and Methley Rangers F.C. are also now defunct village clubs. United were formed in 2002 for local juniors to play football in the village and the club in 2021, now have a staggering 29 teams, made up of junior teams (U5s-u18s), alongside a male vets team and ladies team. The club are one of the fastest growing football clubs in the country.

Methley Warriors A.R.L.F.C and Methley Royals R.L.F.C., are the village Rugby League teams.

== See also ==
- Listed buildings in Methley
