= Newsham railway station =

Railway station in Northumberland, England

Newsham
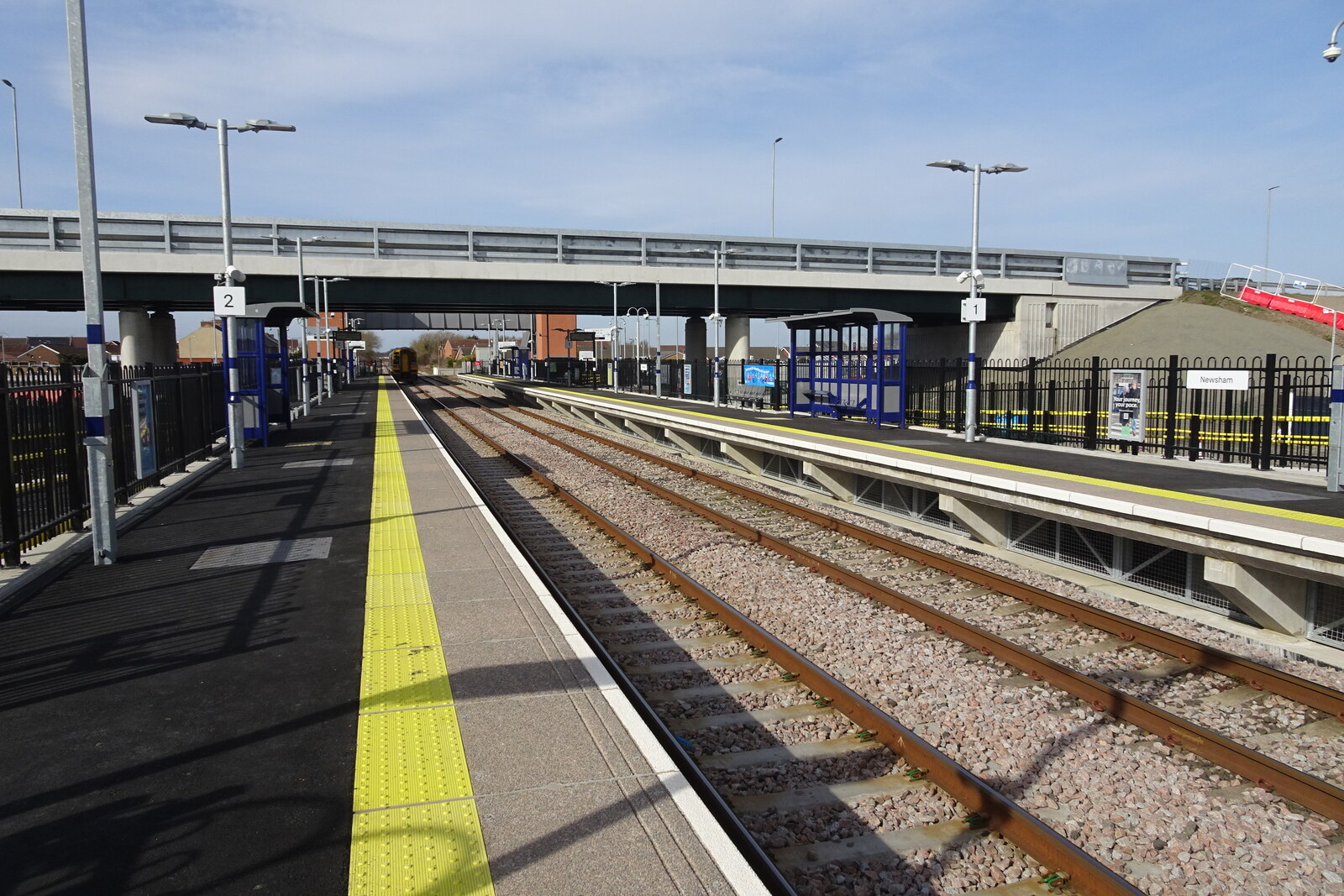
- Newsham railway station in 2025

General information
- Location: Blyth, Northumberland; England
- Coordinates: 55°06′10″N 1°31′26″W
- Grid reference: NZ305787
- Owner: National Rail
- Manager: Northern Trains
- Line: Northumberland Line
- Platforms: 2
- Tracks: 2

Other information
- Station code: NWH

History
- Original company: Blyth and Tyne Railway
- Pre-grouping: North Eastern Railway
- Post-grouping: London and North Eastern Railway; British Rail (North Eastern)

Key dates
- 1851: Opened
- 2 November 1964: Closed to passengers
- 7 June 1965: Closed to goods
- 17 March 2025: Reopened

Passengers
- 2024/25: 15,576
- 2025/26: 0.308 million
Location
- Location within Northumberland
Notes
- Passenger statistics from the Office of Rail and Road

Newsham railway station (/ˈnjuːzəm/) serves the village of Newsham near Blyth, Northumberland, England. It was originally open from 1851 to 1964 on the Blyth and Tyne Railway. It was located at the junction of the Percy Main to Blyth and Bedlington lines of the Blyth and Tyne Railway. The station was closed by British Railways in 1964 and a new station was opened in 2025.

== History ==
The station was opened in summer 1851 by the Blyth and Tyne Railway. It was situated at the end of Seaton Avenue and Carlton Road, off South Newsham Road on the B1523. There was an extensive system of sidings at the station and The Railway Clearing House Handbook indicated that the station handled goods and livestock. The station was closed to passengers on 2 November 1964 and closed completely on 7 June 1965.

== Reopening ==
Proposals to reintroduce passenger rail services to the then freight-only section of the former Blyth and Tyne Railway system have been discussed since the mid to late 1980s.

In the early 2010s, Northumberland County Council (NCC) became interested in the proposals, commissioning Network Rail to complete a GRIP 1 study to examine the best options for the scheme in June 2013. This report was published in March 2014 and was followed in June 2015 with the commissioning of a more detailed GRIP 2 study at a cost of £850,000. The GRIP 2 study, published in October 2016, confirmed that the reintroduction of a frequent seven-day a week passenger service between Newcastle, Ashington and possibly a new terminus to the east, at Woodhorn, was feasible and could provide economic benefits of £70 million with more than 380,000 people using the line each year by 2034. This study suggested that though Newsham station should be reopened to serve the village itself, Blyth would be better served by a dedicated park and ride station near to the former site of Bebside station which would be closer to both the town centre and the A189 dual carriageway.

Despite a change in the political leadership of Northumberland County Council following the 2017 local elections the authority continued to develop the project, encouraged by the Department for Transport's November 2017 report, A Strategic Vision for Rail, which named the line as a possible candidate for a future reintroduction of passenger services. Consequentially, NCC commissioned a further interim study in November 2017 (dubbed GRIP 2B) to determine whether high costs and long timescales identified in the GRIP 2 Study could be reduced by reducing the initial scope of the project, but the report failed to deliver on this.

Nonetheless, the county council has continued to develop the project, hiring AECOM and SCL Rail as contractors to develop the scheme on their behalf in 2018 and allocating an additional £3.46 million in funding for a further business case and detailed design study (equivalent to GRIP 3) in February 2019. Revised plans were revealed in July 2019 which were reduced in scope from the 2016 GRIP 2 study and proposed 4-phase project to reduce the initial cost of the scheme. Under the £90 million Phase 1, Newsham would have become the only station reopened to serve Blyth on the Newcastle to Ashington Northumberland Line passenger service while the park and ride station at Bebside was to be added as an additional station in Phase 2. However, in August 2020, it was reported that these four proposed phases might be merged into a single one.

The North East Joint Transport Committee's bid for £377 million of funding from the UK Government's £1.28 billion Transforming Cities Fund, submitted on 20 June 2019, includes £99 million to fund the reintroduction of passenger services between Newcastle and Ashington, while further work is ongoing to secure additional public and private investment for the project.

The Department for Transport allocated an initial grant of £1.5 million towards the project costs in January 2020 which was supplemented by an allocation of £10 million of funds from Northumberland County Council the following month. This funding enabled AECOM to begin detailed on-site ground investigation works in October 2020. The allocation of a further £34 million of UK Government funding for the project in January 2021 enables the necessary land to be purchased, detailed designs to be prepared and some early preparatory and site works to begin. In January 2021, it was anticipated that the UK Government would fund the remainder of the project cost, estimated at £166 million as of January 2021, once the final phase of design works were completed. However, in April 2021, it was reported that government officials were seeking to reduce the cost of the project as part of the Department for Transport's Project SPEED initiative. It was reported that the cost-saving measures under consideration included and cutting initial service frequencies from two to one trains per hour and dropping the proposed new station at Bebside from initial project scope (although the latter option was later publicly ruled out by Minister for Railways Chris Heaton-Harris).

Northumberland County Council submitted a Transport and Works Act Order application to the Secretary of State for Transport Grant Shapps on 26 May 2021, under which they would be conferred certain additional powers deemed necessary for the new stations to be constructed and the line upgraded to carry regular passenger services. If approved, the new Newsham station will be constructed by the project's primary construction contractor, Morgan Sindall.

Main Northumberland Line construction began in early 2022, with an anticipated opening date in 2024. However after delays the final opening date was not announced until February 2025 by Northumberland County Council with the station opening on 17 March 2025.

== Services ==
Weekday and Saturday daytime services operate half- hourly, with an hourly service during the evening and on Sunday. As of December 2024, the end-to-end journey time between Newcastle and Ashington is around 35–40 minutes. All services are operated by Northern Trains.

Preceding station	National Rail	Following station
Seaton Delaval	Northern Trains; Northumberland Line	Blyth Bebside
	Historical railways	
Hartley; Line open; station closed	Blyth and Tyne Railway	Bebside; Line & Station open
Hartley; Line open; station closed	Blyth and Tyne Railway	Blyth; Line and station closed
