= Blyth Bebside railway station =

Railway station in Northumberland, England

Blyth Bebside
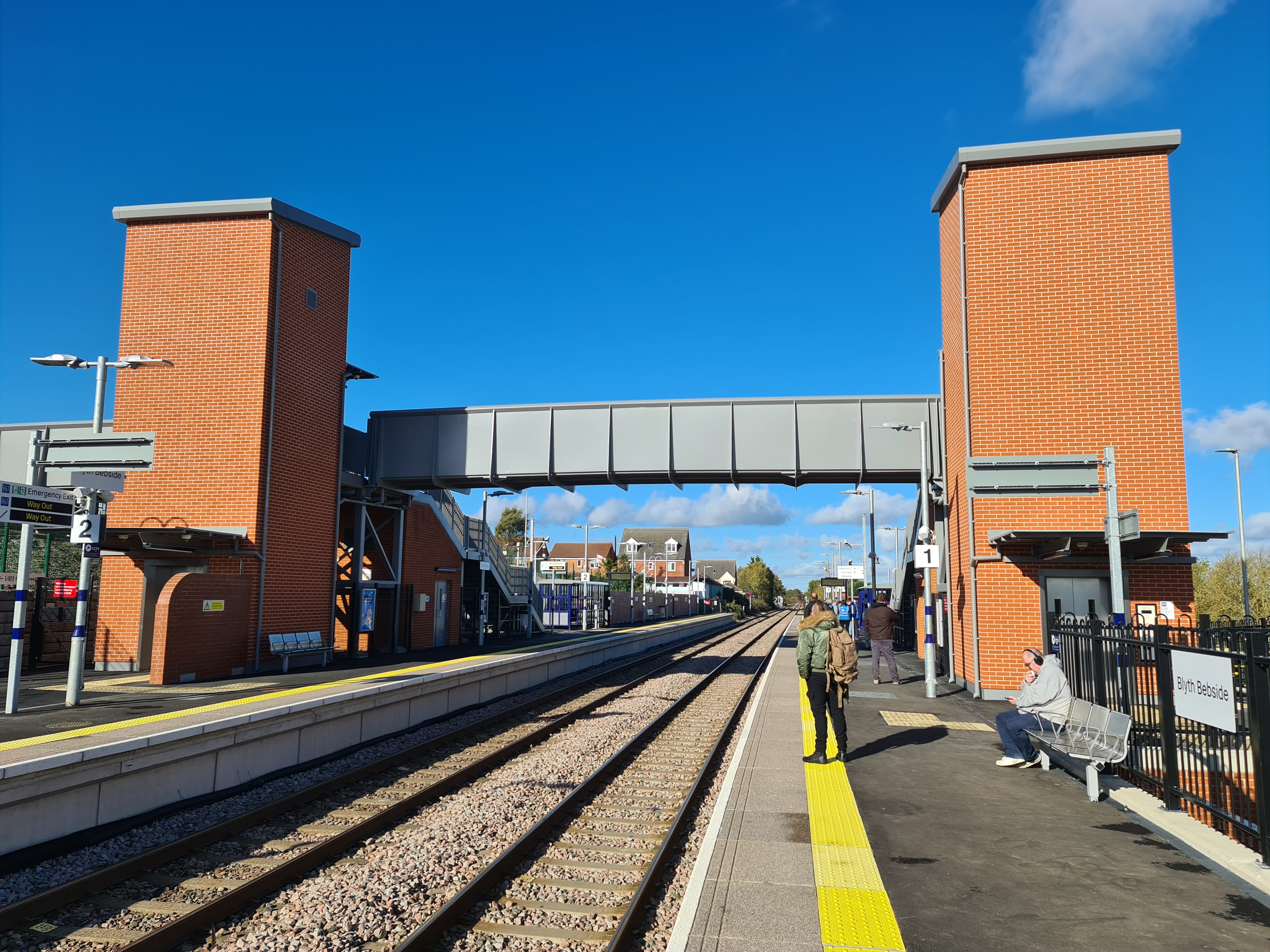
- The station seen from platform 1

General information
- Location: Bebside, Northumberland, England
- Coordinates: 55°07′30″N 1°33′26″W
- Grid reference: NZ283812
- Owner: National Rail
- Manager: Northern Trains
- Line: Northumberland Line
- Platforms: 2
- Tracks: 2

Other information
- Status: Open
- Station code: BLI

History
- Original company: Blyth and Tyne Railway
- Pre-grouping: North Eastern Railway
- Post-grouping: London and North Eastern Railway, British Rail (North Eastern)

Key dates
- 3 August 1850: Opened as Cowpen Lane
- 1860: Renamed Bebside
- 2 November 1964: Closed
- 19 October 2025: Reopened on a new site as Blyth Bebside

Passengers
- 2025/26: 83,538
Location
- Location within Northumberland
Notes
- Passenger statistics from the Office of Rail and Road

Blyth Bebside is a railway station on the Northumberland Line, serving trains running between Newcastle and Ashington. The station serves the town of Blyth and village of Bebside, in Northumberland, England. It was opened on 19 October 2025 and replaced a station that previously served the settlements from 1850 to 1964.

== History ==
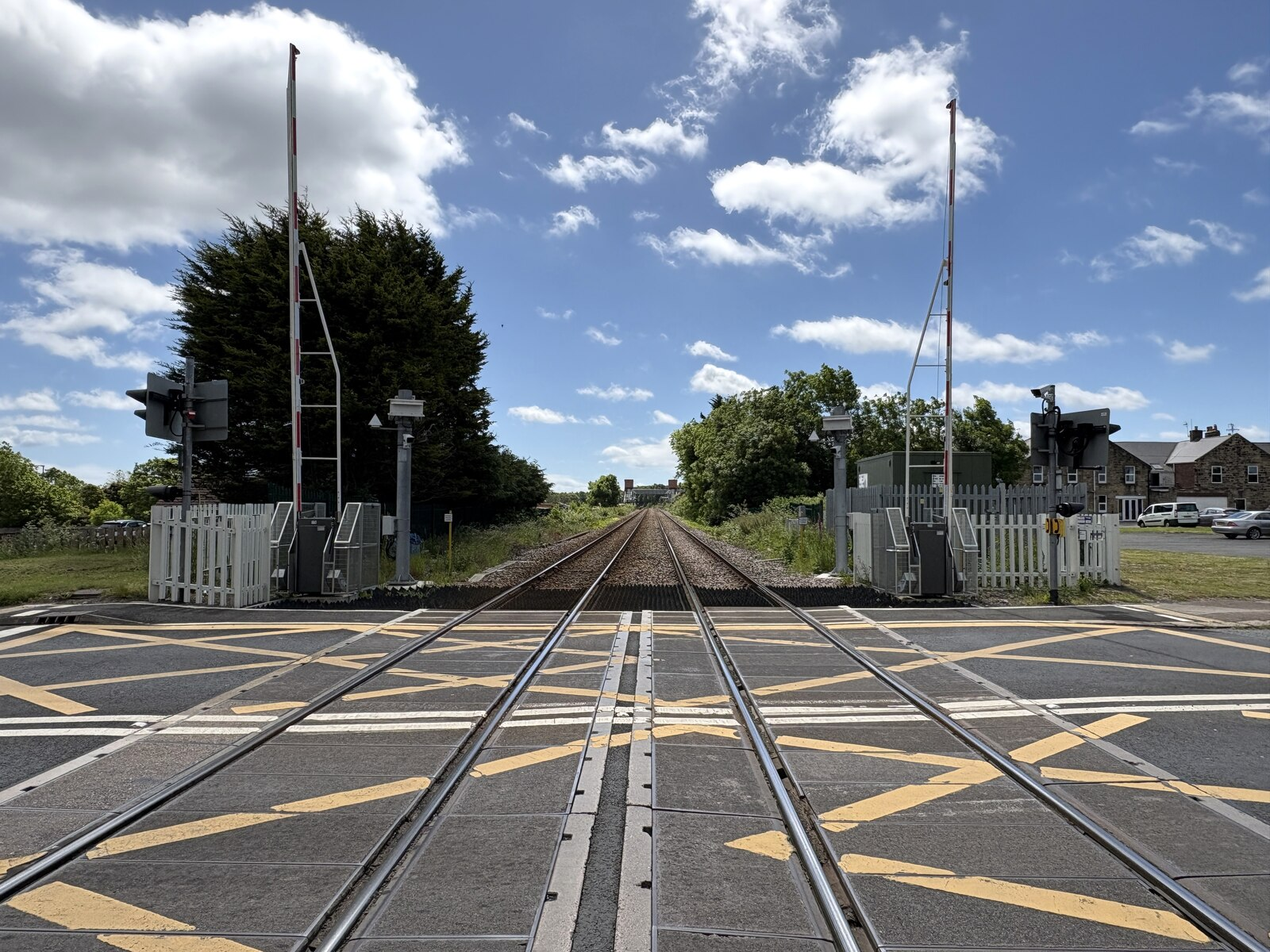
Site of the old Bebside station

=== Original station ===
The original station was opened on 3 August 1850 as Cowpen Lane by the Blyth and Tyne Railway. It was situated on the south side of Front Street on the A19. The goods shed was north of the level crossing and east of the running lines; this was closed on 9 December 1963. The station was closed on 2 November 1964.

=== Reopening proposals ===
Proposals to reintroduce passenger railway services to the freight-only section of the former Blyth and Tyne Railway system have been discussed since the 1990s.

Denis Murphy, the then Labour MP for Wansbeck, expressed support in the House of Commons in an adjournment debate in April 1999 and again in a debate in January 2007. The Railway Development Society (renamed Railfuture in 2000) also endorsed the proposal in 1998.

Later, in 2009, the Association of Train Operating Companies published a £34 million proposal to restore passenger services from Newcastle to Ashington, serving Blyth in this way.

In the early 2010s, Northumberland County Council became interested in the proposals, commissioning Network Rail to complete a GRIP 1 study to examine the best options for the scheme in June 2013. This report was published in March 2014 and was followed in June 2015 with the commissioning of a more detailed GRIP 2 study at a cost of £850,000. The GRIP 2 study, published in October 2016, confirmed that the reintroduction of a frequent seven-day a week passenger service between Newcastle, Ashington and possibly a new terminus to the east, at Woodhorn, was feasible and could provide economic benefits of £70 million with more than 380,000 people using the line each year by 2034.

The study suggested that a new Blyth Park & Ride station should be constructed close to the site of Bebside station to serve Blyth, due to its proximity to the A189 dual carriageway.

Despite a change in the political leadership of Northumberland County Council following the 2017 local elections the authority continued to develop the project, encouraged by the Department for Transport's November 2017 report, A Strategic Vision for Rail, which named the line as a possible candidate for a future reintroduction of passenger services. Consequentially, NCC commissioned a further interim study in November 2017 (dubbed GRIP 2B) to determine whether high costs and long timescales identified in the GRIP 2 Study could be reduced by reducing the initial scope of the project, but the report failed to deliver on this. The county council hired AECOM and SLC Rail as contractors to develop the scheme on their behalf in 2018 and allocating an additional £3.46 million in funding for a further business case and detailed design study (equivalent to GRIP 3) in February 2019. Revised plans were revealed in July 2019, which were reduced in scope from the 2016 GRIP 2 study and proposed four-phase project to reduce the initial cost of the scheme. The proposed station at Bebside (now referred to as Blyth Bebside) would have only been added during Phase 2. However, in August 2020, it was reported that these four proposed phases might be merged into a single one.

The North East Joint Transport Committee's bid for £377 million of funding from the UK Government's £1.28 billion Transforming Cities Fund, submitted on 20 June 2019, includes £99 million to fund the reintroduction of passenger services between Newcastle and Ashington, while further work is ongoing to secure additional public and private investment for the project.

The Department for Transport allocated an initial grant of £1.5 million towards the project's costs in January 2020, which was supplemented by an allocation of £10 million of funds from Northumberland County Council the following month. This funding enabled AECOM to begin detailed on-site ground investigation works in October 2020. The allocation of a further £34 million of UK Government funding for the project in January 2021 enables the necessary land to be purchased, detailed designs to be prepared, and some early preparatory and site works to begin. In January 2021, it was anticipated that the UK Government would fund the remainder of the project cost, estimated at £166 million as of January 2021, once the final phase of design works were completed. However, in April 2021, it was reported that government officials were seeking to reduce the cost of the project as part of the Department for Transport's Project Speed initiative. It was reported that the cost-saving measures under consideration included dropping the proposed station at Bebside from initial project scope and cutting initial service frequencies from two to one train per hour. Although Minister for Railways, Chris Heaton-Harris, later reiterated the UK Government's commitment to opening the new station at Bebside, it remained unclear whether other cost saving measures, such as reducing service frequencies, are being pursued.

A planning application for the proposed new station at Bebside was submitted to Northumberland County Council on 5 March 2021. The submitted planning documents indicate that the station would be located approximately 200 metres (220 yd) to the south of the original, where the line passes through a cutting. The station will have entrances on both sides of the tracks and its two 100 metres (110 yd) platforms will be accessed via lifts and stairs from a glass-sided footbridge. A 293-space car park would be provided, adjacent to the western entrance, while a new cycle path would be created to link the eastern entrance directly to Bebside and Blyth (crossing the A189 road via a new bridge). Planning permission was granted in early 2022.

Northumberland County Council submitted a Transport and Works Act Order application to the Secretary of State for Transport, Grant Shapps, on 26 May 2021, under which they would be conferred certain additional powers deemed necessary for the new stations to be constructed and the line upgraded to carry regular passenger services. The application was approved in June 2022. The new Blyth Bebside station was constructed by the project's primary construction contractor, Morgan Sindall.

The new station was not ready in time for the line's opening in December 2024; it finally opened on 19 October 2025.

== Services ==
All services on the Northumberland Line are operated by Northern Trains. Daytime services operate half-hourly, with an hourly service during the evening and on Sundays.

An end-to-end journey time between Newcastle and Ashington takes around 35 minutes.

Preceding station	National Rail	Following station
Newsham	Northern Trains; Northumberland Line	Bedlington
	Historical railways	
Newsham; Line & Station open	Blyth and Tyne Railway	Bedlington; Line open; station closed

== Bibliography ==
- Bevan, Alan, ed. (1998). A-Z of Rail Reopenings (fourth ed.). Fareham: Railway Development Society Ltd. p. 59. ISBN 0-901283-13-4.
- "Connecting Communities – Expanding Access to the Rail Network" (PDF). London: Association of Train Operating Companies. June 2009.
- "21/00878/CCD - Planning Application Documents". Northumberland County Council. 3 March 2021.
