= Newbiggin-by-the-Sea railway station =

Disused railway station in Newbiggin-by-the-Sea, Northumberland

Newbiggin-by-the-Sea

General information
- Location: Newbiggin-by-the-Sea, Northumberland; England
- Coordinates: 55.1833°N 1.5165°W
- Grid reference: NZ308877
- Platforms: 2

Other information
- Status: Disused

History
- Original company: Blyth and Tyne Railway
- Pre-grouping: North Eastern Railway
- Post-grouping: LNER; British Rail (North Eastern)

Key dates
- 1 March 1872: Opened
- 2 November 1964: Closed
Location

Newbiggin-by-the-Sea railway station, also referred to as Newbiggin station, served the town of Newbiggin-by-the-Sea, Northumberland, England from 1872 to 1964 on the Blyth and Tyne Railway.

== History ==
The station opened as Newbiggin on 1 March 1872 as a terminus of the Blyth and Tyne Railway. (Note: The station name is sometimes quoted with -by-the-Sea, and sometimes without. Quick (2022) records that the company timetables, Bradshaw, and tickets were all without and that it was mainly the Railway Clearing House that used it in their Handbook of Railway Stations, the station running in boards were all without,)

It was situated on the west side of Front Street (now the B1334) and north of what is now the junction with the Buteland Terrace.

The station had a long island platform onto which the station building faced. There were sidings on both sides of the station which handled a variety of goods traffic, mainly potatoes and livestock, it was equipped with a one-ton crane. There was a signal box and a turntable.

A camping coach was positioned here by the North Eastern Region from 1959 to 1964.

The station closed to both passengers and goods traffic on 2 November 1964.

=== Potential reopening ===
Provision has been made when building the Northumberland Line stations, especially at Ashington so that if there is a separate scheme, the line could be extended to Woodhorn and Newbiggin. As of the end of 2025, there were calls to resurrect Woodhorn station as a park and ride scheme as well as extend the railway by 1.6km (1 mile) into the centre of Newbiggin-by-the-Sea. This will require new track and is all subject to a feasibility study. A formal bid was launched in December 2025 for this.

| Preceding station | Historical railways | Following station |
|---|---|---|
| Ashington; Line closed and station open | North Eastern Railway; Blyth and Tyne Railway | Terminus |
