= Bedlington railway station =

Railway station in Northumberland, England

Bedlington
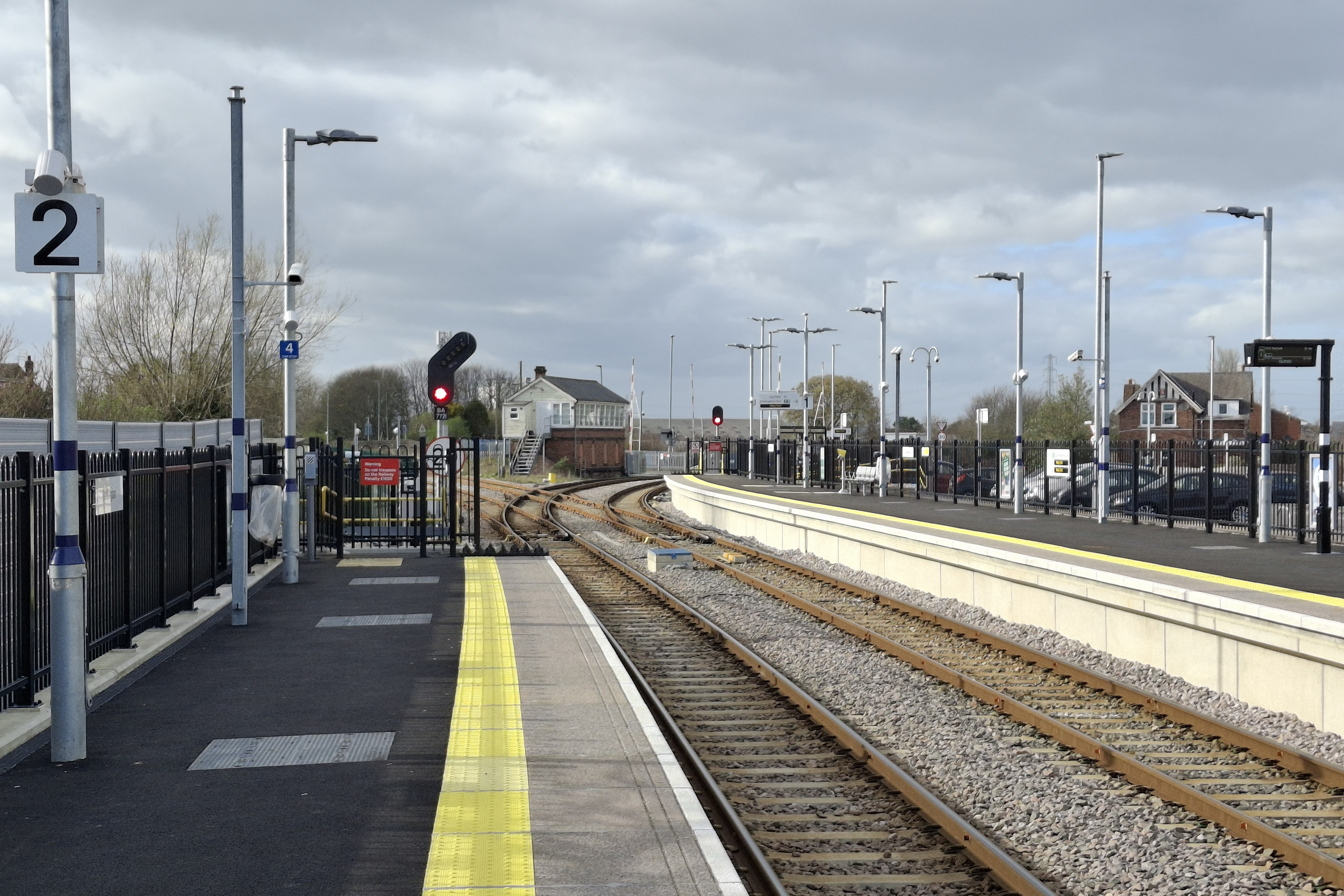
- View northward, towards Ashington (curving right at North Box) and Morpeth (left)

General information
- Location: Bedlington, Northumberland, England
- Coordinates: 55.1404°N 1.567°W
- Grid reference: NZ275829
- Owner: National Rail
- Manager: Northern Trains
- Line: Northumberland Line
- Platforms: 2
- Tracks: 2

Other information
- Status: Open
- Station code: BEJ

History
- Original company: Blyth and Tyne Railway
- Pre-grouping: North Eastern Railway
- Post-grouping: London and North Eastern Railway, British Rail (North Eastern)

Key dates
- 3 August 1850: Opened
- 2 November 1964: Closed
- Autumn 2022: Construction work began
- 29 March 2026: Reopened

Passengers
- 2025/26: 1,704
Location
- Location within Northumberland
Notes
- Passenger statistics from the Office of Rail and Road

Bedlington is a railway station on the Northumberland Line, serving trains running between Newcastle and Ashington. The station serves the town of Bedlington, in Northumberland, England. It was opened on 29 March 2026 and replaced a station that previously served the town from 1850 to 1964.

== History ==
=== Original station ===
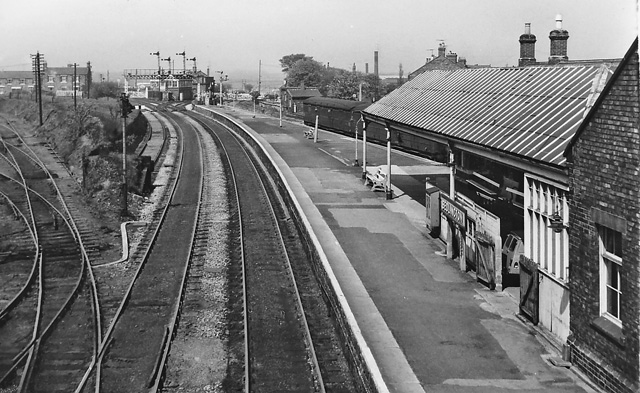
View northward, towards Ashington and Newbiggin (curving right at North Box) and Morpeth (left background); the colliery line is left foreground. 12 May 1965

The station was opened on 3 August 1850 by the Blyth and Tyne Railway. It was situated on the north side of the level crossing on Station Road, west of the junction with Palace Road, near to Bedlington Colliery. In 1911, North Eastern Railway (NER) statistics showed that a population of 14,755 was served by the station in that year. In the inter-war years, residential development grew in the vicinity of the station and the number of passengers who used it increased. It was closed to both passengers and goods traffic on 2 November 1964.

=== Reopening proposals ===
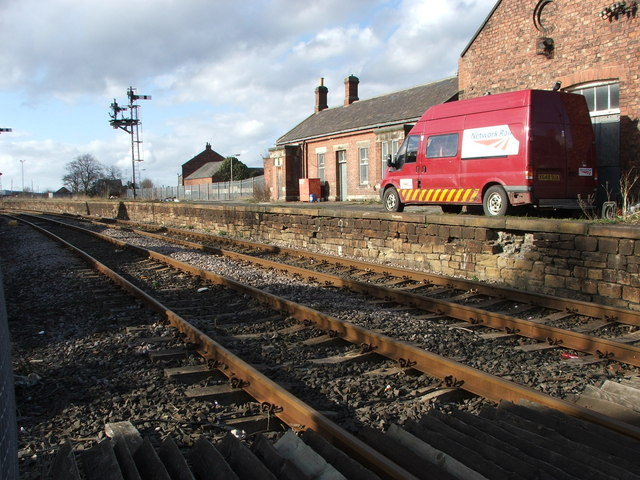
The former platform and station buildings at Bedlington in April 2006. Planning documents suggested that this platform could be rebuilt and incorporated into the new northbound platform, if the station was to be reopened

Proposals to reintroduce passenger rail services to the currently freight-only section of the former Blyth and Tyne Railway system have been discussed since the 1990s.

In the early 2010s, Northumberland County Council became interested in the proposals, commissioning Network Rail to complete a GRIP 1 study to examine the best options for the scheme in June 2013. This report was published in March 2014 and was followed in June 2015 with the commissioning of a more detailed GRIP 2 study at a cost of £850,000.

The GRIP 2 study, published in October 2016, confirmed that the reintroduction of a frequent seven-day a week passenger service between Newcastle, Ashington and possibly a new terminus to the east, at Woodhorn, was feasible and could provide economic benefits of £70 million with more than 380,000 people using the line each year by 2034. Despite a change in the political leadership of Northumberland County Council, following the 2017 local elections, the authority continued to develop the project, encouraged by the Department for Transport's November 2017 report, A Strategic Vision for Rail, which named the line as a possible candidate for a future reintroduction of passenger services. Consequentially, NCC commissioned a further interim study in November 2017 (dubbed GRIP 2B) to determine whether high costs and long timescales identified in the GRIP 2 Study could be reduced by reducing the initial scope of the project, but the report failed to deliver on this.

Nonetheless, the county council has continued to develop the project, hiring AECOM and SLC Rail as contractors to develop the scheme on their behalf in 2018 and allocating an additional £3.46 million in funding for a further business case and detailed design study (equivalent to GRIP 3) in February 2019. Revised plans were revealed in July 2019 which were reduced in scope from the 2016 GRIP 2 study and proposed 4-phase project to reduce the initial cost of the scheme. Phase 1, at an estimated cost of £90 million, would have seen Bedlington station reopened as the penultimate stop for hourly passenger trains on the Newcastle to Ashington Northumberland Line, while later phases would have added additional stations and the infrastructure upgrades required elsewhere on the line to provide a half-hourly frequency. However, in August 2020 it was reported that these four proposed phases might be merged into a single one.

The North East Joint Transport Committee's bid for £377 million of funding from the UK Government's £1.28 billion Transforming Cities Fund, submitted on 20 June 2019, included £99 million to fund the reintroduction of passenger services between Newcastle and Ashington, while further work is ongoing to secure additional public and private investment for the project.

The Department for Transport allocated an initial grant of £1.5 million towards the project costs in January 2020 which was supplemented by an allocation of £10 million of funds from Northumberland County Council the following month. This funding enabled AECOM to begin detailed on-site ground investigation works in October 2020. The allocation of a further £34 million of UK Government funding for the project in January 2021 enables the necessary land to be purchased, detailed designs to be prepared and some early preparatory and site works to begin.

In January 2021, it was anticipated that the UK Government would fund the remainder of the project cost, estimated at £166 million as of January 2021, once the final phase of design works were completed. However, in April 2021, it was reported that government officials were seeking to reduce the cost of the project as part of the Department for Transport's Project Speed initiative. It was reported that the cost-saving measures under consideration included cutting initial service frequencies from two to one trains per hour and dropping the proposed Blyth Bebside station from initial project scope; although the latter option was later publicly ruled out by the Minister for Railways, Chris Heaton-Harris.

A planning application for the proposed new station at Bedlington was submitted to Northumberland County Council on 18 March 2021. The submitted planning documents indicate that the new station will be constructed on the same site as the previous one, with part of the extant original platform to be rebuilt for incorporation into a new 100 m (110 yd) down (northbound) platform and the surviving station buildings retained. An entirely new 100 m (110 yd) up platform will be added on the opposite (west) side of the through lines, between Bedlington South Level Crossing and the junction with the line to Morpeth. Passengers will be able to transfer between the two platforms using the existing level crossing. The station will be served by two car parks: one with 36 spaces will be located immediately to the north-east of the up platform, while the other will have 31 spaces and will be located on the opposite side of Barrington Road.

Northumberland County Council submitted a Transport and Works Act Order application to the Secretary of State for Transport, Grant Shapps, on 26 May 2021, which was approved on 27 June 2022. The council has been conferred certain additional powers deemed necessary for the new stations to be constructed and the line upgraded to carry regular passenger services. The new Bedlington station will be constructed by the project's primary construction contractor, Morgan Sindall. The main construction phase began in autumn 2022, with a planned opening date in 2024.

In January 2024, it was announced that the station would not reopen that year. In February 2026, it was confirmed that Bedlington's reopening would take place on 29 March 2026, as the last station to open on the Northumberland Line in the current scheme.

== Services ==
Northern Trains operates a half-hourly service six days per week during the daytime, with an hourly service during the evening and on Sundays. An end-to-end journey time between Newcastle and Ashington is around 35 minutes.

Preceding station	National Rail	Following station
Blyth Bebside	Northern Trains; Northumberland Line	Ashington
	Historical railways	
Bebside; Line & station open	Blyth and Tyne Railway	Choppington; Line open; station closed
Bebside; Line & station open	Blyth and Tyne Railway	North Seaton; Line open; station closed
