= North Seaton railway station =

Disused railway station in Ashington, Northumberland

North Seaton

General information
- Location: Ashington, Northumberland; England
- Coordinates: 55.1694°N 1.5655°W
- Grid reference: NZ277862
- Platforms: 2

Other information
- Status: Disused

History
- Original company: Blyth and Tyne Railway
- Pre-grouping: North Eastern Railway
- Post-grouping: LNER; British Rail (North Eastern)

Key dates
- 7 November 1859: Opened
- 2 November 1964: Closed
Location

North Seaton railway station served the town of Ashington, Northumberland, England from 1859 to 1964 on the Blyth and Tyne Railway.

== History ==
The station opened on 7 November 1859 by the Blyth and Tyne Railway. It was situated on the north side of the level crossing on Blackclose Bank on the A196, 100 yards west of the junction with the B1334. North Seaton Colliery opened a mile south east of the station in the 1860s and a mining village of the same name was spawned soon after. The station was closed to goods traffic on 9 December 1963 and closed to passengers on 2 November 1964.

Preceding station	Disused railways	Following station
Bedlington; Line open; station open	Blyth and Tyne Railway	Ashington; Line open; station open
