= Choppington railway station =

Disused railway station in Choppington, Northumberland

Choppington
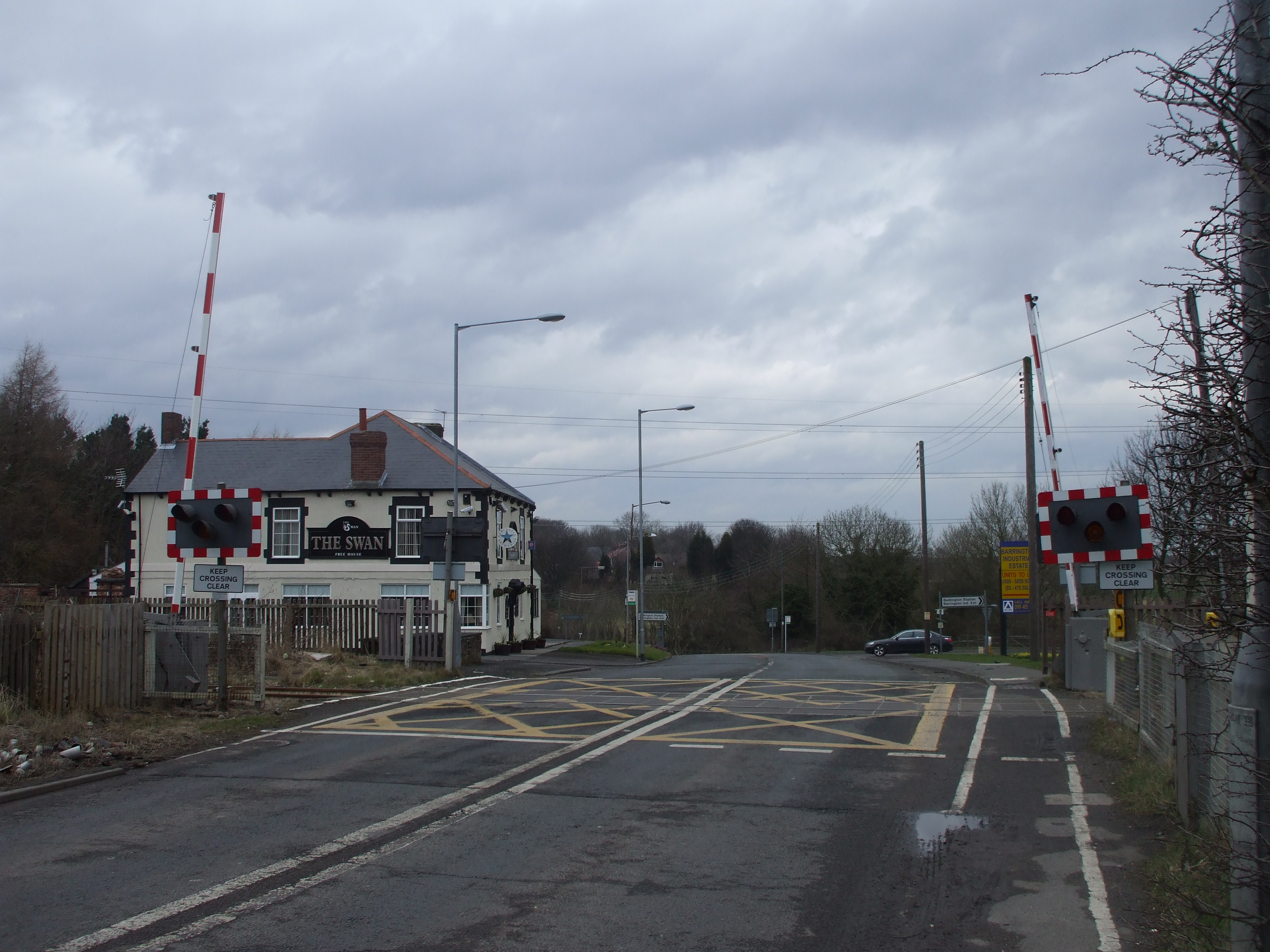
- The level crossing to the right of the site of the station, in 2010

General information
- Location: Choppington, Northumberland; England
- Coordinates: 55.1452°N 1.6008°W
- Grid reference: NZ255834
- Platforms: 2

Other information
- Status: Disused

History
- Original company: Blyth and Tyne Railway
- Pre-grouping: North Eastern Railway
- Post-grouping: LNER; British Railways (North Eastern)

Key dates
- 1 April 1858: Opened
- 3 April 1950: Closed to passengers
- 9 March 1964: Closed completely
Location

Choppington railway station served the village of Choppington, Northumberland, England from 1858 to 1964 on the Blyth and Tyne Railway.

== History ==
The station opened on 1 April 1858 by the Blyth and Tyne Railway. It was situated on the A1068 west of the level crossing. There were two sidings that entered from the west, they were located behind the platforms and they served as brick works. These were removed by 1922. The station was closed to passengers on 3 April 1950, although there was an excursion to and from Bellingham that ran on 22 September 1962. The station was closed to goods traffic on 9 March 1964.

Preceding station	Disused railways	Following station
Bedlington; Line & station open	Blyth and Tyne Railway	Hepscott; Line open; station closed
