= Ashington railway station =

Railway station in Northumberland, England

Ashington
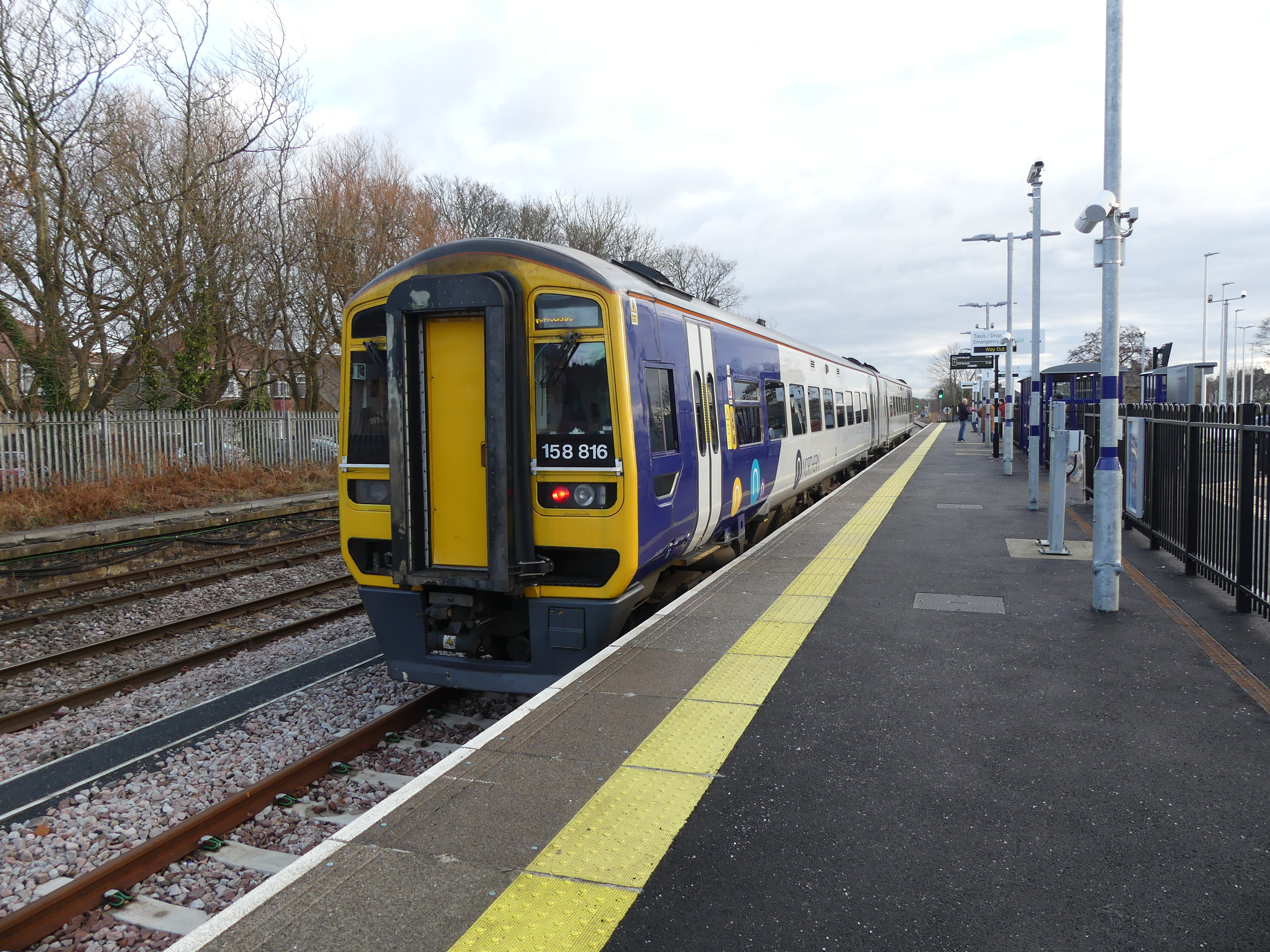
- Ashington station, January 2025

General information
- Location: Ashington, Northumberland, England
- Coordinates: 55°10′55″N 1°34′23″W
- Owner: National Rail
- Manager: Northern Trains
- Line: Northumberland Line
- Platforms: 1 (2 disused platforms from the original station remain in situ)
- Tracks: 3

Other information
- Station code: ASL

History
- Original company: Blyth and Tyne Railway
- Pre-grouping: North Eastern Railway
- Post-grouping: London and North Eastern Railway, British Rail (North Eastern)

Key dates
- 1 March 1872: Opened as Hirst for Ashington
- 1 October 1889: Renamed Ashington
- 2 November 1964: Closed
- 15 December 2024: Reopened

Passengers
- 2024/25: 0.131 million
- 2025/26: 0.437 million
Location
- Location within Northumberland
Notes
- Passenger statistics from the Office of Rail and Road

Ashington railway station is the northern terminus of the Northumberland Line to Newcastle. The station serves the town of Ashington, in Northumberland, England. It is owned by Network Rail and managed by Northern Trains.

== History ==
=== The original station ===
The station was opened on 1 March 1872 as Hirst for Ashington, serving the Newbiggin-by-the-Sea branch of the North Eastern Railway (NER).

In 1874, the NER took over the Blyth and Tyne Railway, later becoming part of the London and North Eastern Railway following the 1923 grouping. On nationalisation in 1948, ownership was passed to the North Eastern Region of British Railways.

The station was closed to passenger services on 2 November 1964, as part of the Beeching cuts.

=== Reopening ===
Proposals to reintroduce passenger rail services to the freight-only section of the former Blyth and Tyne Railway system had been discussed since the 1990s.

In the early 2010s, Northumberland County Council (NCC) became interested in the proposals, commissioning Network Rail to complete a GRIP 1 study to examine the best options for the scheme in June 2013. This report was published in March 2014 and was followed in June 2015 with the commissioning of a more detailed GRIP 2 study at a cost of £850,000.

The GRIP 2 study, published in October 2016, confirmed that the reintroduction of a frequent seven-day a week passenger service between Newcastle, Ashington and possibly a new terminus to the east, at Woodhorn, was feasible and could provide economic benefits of £70 million with more than 380,000 people using the line each year by 2034. Despite a change in the political leadership of Northumberland County Council following the 2017 local elections the authority continued to develop the project, encouraged by the Department for Transport's November 2017 report, A Strategic Vision for Rail, which named the line as a possible candidate for a future reintroduction of passenger services. Consequentially, NCC commissioned a further interim study in November 2017 (dubbed GRIP 2B) to determine whether high costs and long timescales identified in the GRIP 2 Study could be reduced by reducing the initial scope of the project, but the report failed to deliver on this.

Nonetheless, the county council continued to develop the project, hiring AECOM and SLC Rail as contractors to develop the scheme on their behalf in 2018 and allocating an additional £3.46 million in funding for a further business case and detailed design study (equivalent to GRIP 3) in February 2019. Revised plans were revealed in July 2019 which were reduced in scope from the 2016 GRIP 2 study and proposed 4-phase project to reduce the initial cost of the scheme. Phase 1, at an estimated cost of £90 million, would have seen hourly passenger trains return to a reopened Ashington station and new turn-back facilities provided to allow trains to terminate there while later phases would have added additional stations and the infrastructure upgrades provided elsewhere on the line to provide a half-hourly frequency. However, in August 2020, it was reported that these four proposed phases could be merged into a single one.

The North East Joint Transport Committee's bid for £377 million of funding from the UK Government's £1.28 billion Transforming Cities Fund, submitted on 20 June 2019, includes £99 million to fund the reintroduction of passenger services between Newcastle and Ashington, while further work is ongoing to secure additional public and private investment for the project.

The Department for Transport allocated an initial grant of £1.5 million towards the project costs in January 2020 which was supplemented by an allocation of £10 million of funds from Northumberland County Council the following month. This funding enabled AECOM to begin detailed on-site ground investigation works in October 2020. The allocation of a further £34 million of UK Government funding for the project in January 2021 enables the necessary land to be purchased, detailed designs to be prepared and some early preparatory and site works to begin. In January 2021, it was anticipated that the UK Government would fund the remainder of the project cost, estimated at £166 million as of January 2021, once the final phase of design works were completed. However, in April 2021, it was reported that government officials were seeking to reduce the cost of the project as part of the Department for Transport's Project Speed initiative. It was reported that the cost-saving measures under consideration included and cutting initial service frequencies from two to one trains per hour and dropping the proposed Blyth Bebside station from initial project scope, although the latter option was later publicly ruled out by Minister for Railways, Chris Heaton-Harris.

A planning application for the new station was submitted to Northumberland County Council on 3 February 2021. The submitted planning documents indicate that the station will have a single 100 m (110 yd) bay platform, located on a short siding which will be recessed into part of the original down (northbound) platform (requiring its partial demolition). It will be accessible from the adjacent Station Yard car park (to be expanded to a capacity of 275 cars) and will be linked to the existing Wansbeck Square footbridge, via a new lift, to provide access to the eastern side of the through lines.

Northumberland County Council submitted a Transport and Works Act Order application to the Secretary of State for Transport Grant Shapps on 26 May 2021, which was approved on 27 June 2022. The council was conferred certain additional powers deemed necessary for the stations to be constructed and the line upgraded to carry regular passenger services. The new station was constructed by the project's primary construction contractor, Morgan Sindall.

The main construction phase began in autumn 2022, with the station reopening on 15 December 2024, along with most of the line.

== Services ==
All services on the Northumberland Line are operated by Northern Trains. Daytime services operate half-hourly, with an hourly service during the evening and on Sundays.

The end-to-end journey time between Newcastle and Ashington takes around 35 minutes.

Preceding station	National Rail	Following station
Bedlington	Northern Trains; Northumberland Line	Terminus
	Historical railways	
North Seaton; Line open; station closed	Blyth and Tyne Railway	Newbiggin-by-the-Sea; Line and station closed

== Gallery ==
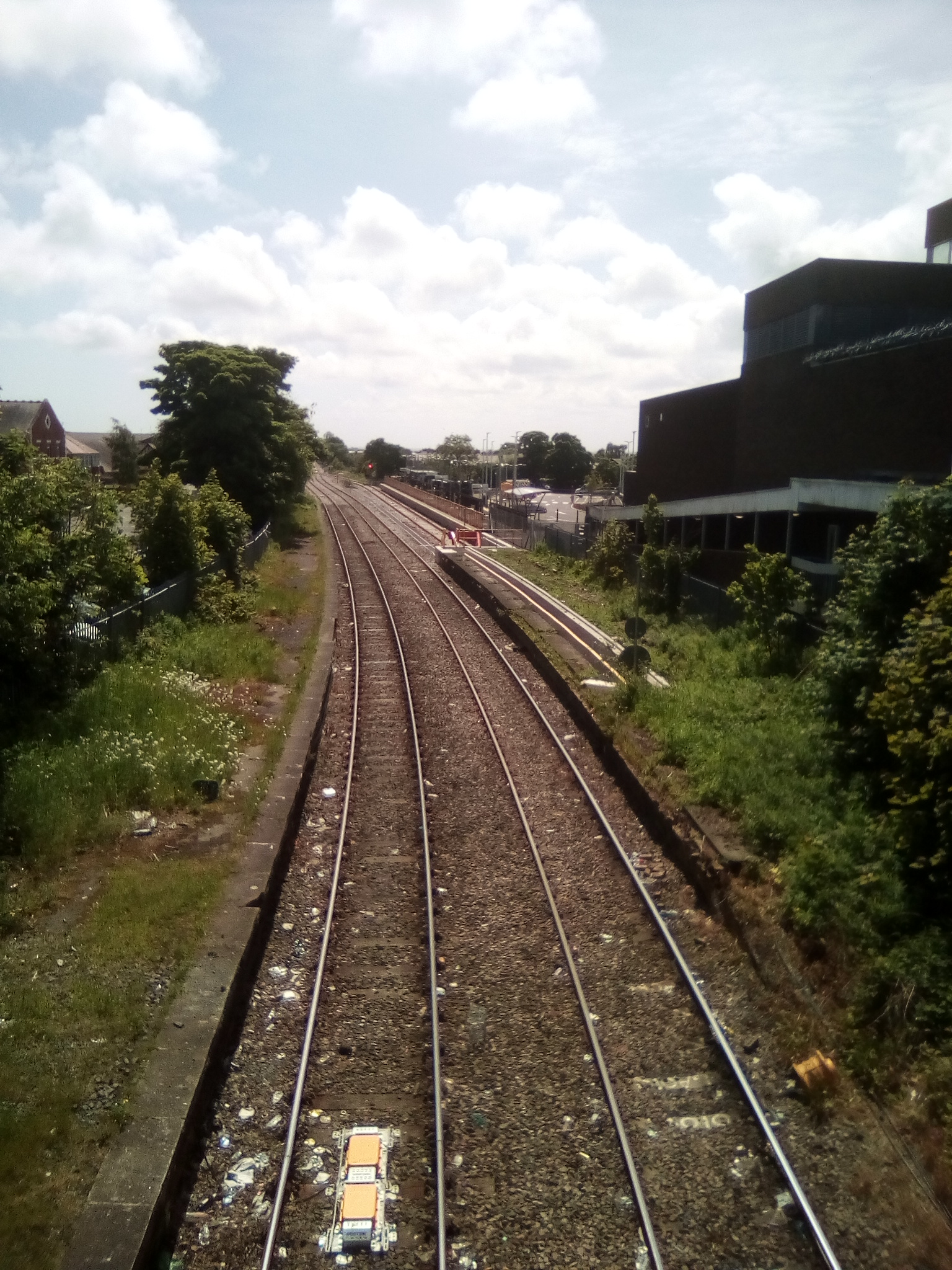
View of the station, from Station Road

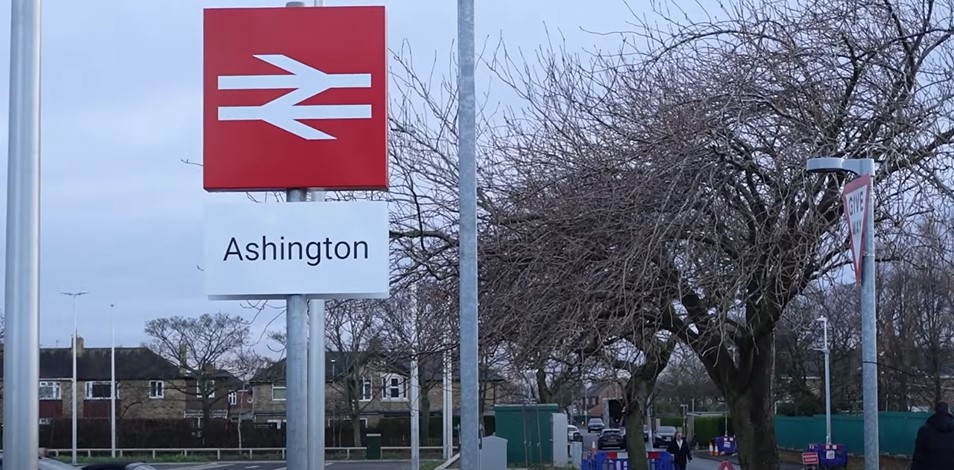
The station sign

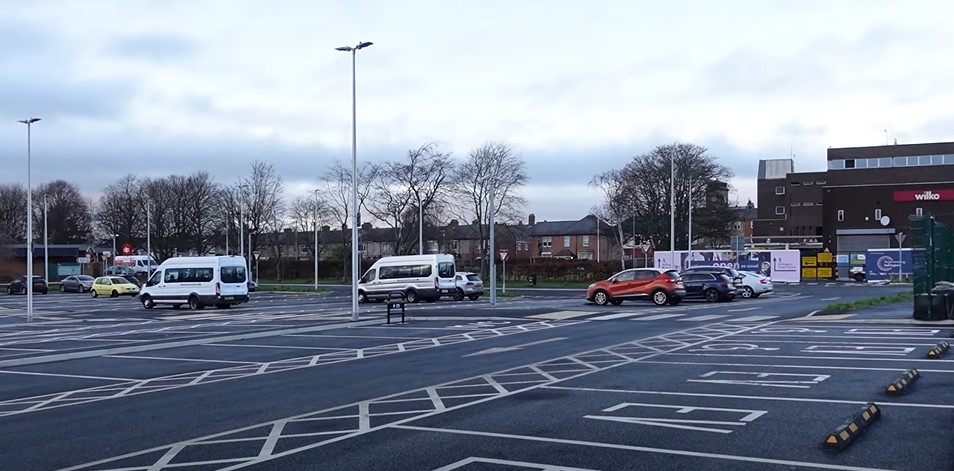
Car park at the station
