= Newbiggin-by-the-Sea =

Town and civil parish in Northumberland, England

Coordinates: 55.183°N 1.515°W

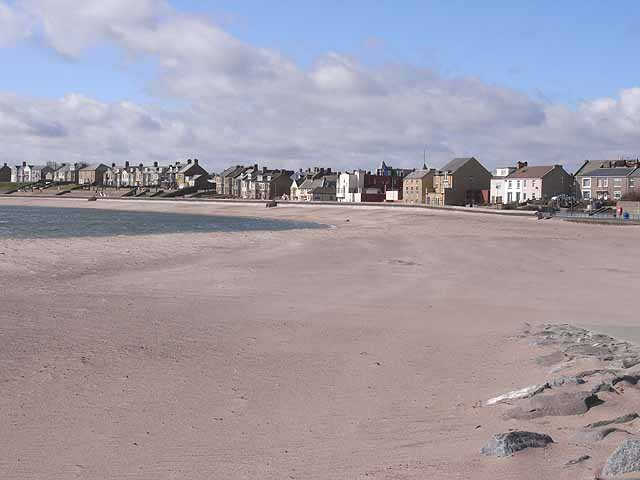
- Newbiggin Bay

- Location within Northumberland
- Population: 5,950 (2021 census)
- OS grid reference: NZ308877
- Civil parish: Newbiggin by the Sea
- Unitary authority: Northumberland
- Ceremonial county: Northumberland
- Region: North East
- Country: England
- Sovereign state: United Kingdom
- Post town: Newbiggin-by-the-Sea
- Postcode district: NE64
- Dialling code: 01670
- Police: Northumbria
- Fire: Northumberland
- Ambulance: North East
- UK Parliament: Blyth and Ashington

Newbiggin-by-the-Sea (Note: This placename is commonly written in both hyphenated and non-hyphenated forms. The official name of the civil parish is Newbiggin by the Sea (without hyphens).), often abbreviated to Newbiggin, is a seaside town and civil parish in Northumberland, England, located on the North Sea coast.

The town is a fishing port and formerly a part of a trade route for shipping grain. Newbiggin Colliery operated from 1908 until 1967.

Newbiggin became a popular beach resort by 1828 and remains a tourist attraction with landmarks such as the Couple sculpture by Sean Henry, and the 13th-century parish church. The town council oversees governance while the economy remains diverse with 89 active companies as of this date. Newbiggin was part of the Wansbeck local government district until 2009, and lies within the Wansbeck UK Parliamentary constituency, represented by Ian Lavery MP since 2010. The town holds an annual music festival that raises money for charity and is also home to several religious sites representing various denominations.

== Toponymy ==
Newbiggin derives its name from the Old English nīwe (new) + Middle English bigging (building, house), and may refer to an extension of the early settlement and ecclesiastical parish of Woodhorn. Historically the name has been spelt as Newbiggen and Newbigging.

The Imperial Gazetteer of England and Wales of 1870-72 records that the suffix '-by-the-Sea' was sometimes used at that time, in particular by the post office.

== History ==
=== Early history ===
The church was for centuries a chapel only, with a tower surmounted by a spire which was originally used as a beacon. In the 14th century, Newbiggin was a very important maritime centre, called upon to support Edward III in his campaigns against the Scots. In the Middle Ages, Newbiggin was a major port for the shipping of grain, third in importance after London and Hull. Henry III granted a charter for a weekly market on Monday and an annual fair; in 1337, as a borough of note, it sent bailiffs to a council on matters of state, convened by the Bishop of Lincoln, the Earl of Warwick and other noblemen.

=== 1800 – present ===
In 1805, two boats, with nineteen men, were lost in a storm off Newbiggin, after which £1,700 was donated by fundraising in the Newcastle region to relieve the bereaved families. As early as 1828, Newbiggin was a popular beach resort, with facilities to cater for visitors. The town had five public houses, one of which had a spa-like array of bathing facilities, several shops and lodging houses. The village featured a shore with a beach about a mile in length, well suited for bathing. By 1848 it was established as a resort in warmer seasons. Several guesthouses took hold. The bay gave good anchorage for small vessels, but even then was very little used, except for the numerous boats belonging to the fishery, in which most of the inhabitants were employed. Pilchard, herring, cod, haddock, whiting, ling, halibut, turbot, sole, and skate were caught by the fishermen of Newbiggin and sold primarily at Newcastle. Salmon, trout, lobsters and crabs were also caught, not only for the supply of the neighbouring markets but the region.

== Transport ==
=== Railways ===
Situated on the west side of Front Street (now the B1334), the station opened on 1 March 1872 as a terminus of the Blyth and Tyne Railway (Note: The station name is sometimes quoted with -by-the-Sea, and sometimes without. Quick (2022) records that the company timetables, Bradshaw, and tickets were all without and that it was mainly the Railway Clearing House that used it in their Handbook of Railway Stations, the station running in boards were all without,) (now known as the Northumberland Line). The station had a long island platform onto which the station building faced. There were sidings on both sides of the station which handled goods traffic, controlled by a signal box. The station closed to both passengers and goods traffic on 2 November 1964. With the reopening of the Northumberland Line, Provisions have been made, especially at Ashington so that the line could be extended to Newbiggin. As of the end of 2025, there were calls to extend the railway by 1 mile (1.6 km) into the centre of Newbiggin-by-the-Sea. This will require new track and is all subject to a feasibility study. A formal bid was launched in December 2025 for this.

== Governance ==
Newbiggin-by-the-Sea has a town council.

Under the Local Government Act 1972, Newbiggin-by-the-Sea became part of the local government district of Wansbeck in 1974. The local government district was abolished in 2009, with its responsibilities transferred to the Northumberland County Council unitary authority.

Newbiggin-by-the-Sea is in the UK Parliamentary constituency of Blyth and Ashington which, since the 2024 general election, has been represented at Westminster by Ian Lavery MP.

The former local government district of Wansbeck and the Parliamentary constituency of Wansbeck both derive their names from the River Wansbeck which flows into the North Sea near Newbiggin-by-the-Sea.

== Demographics ==
At the 2021 census, the civil parish had a population of 5,950 people in 2,853 households.

Census population of Newbiggin by the Sea parish
| Census | Population | Female | Male | Households | Source |
|---|---|---|---|---|---|
| 2011 | 6,308 | 3,274 | 3,034 | 2,853 | |
| 2021 | 5,950 | 3,104 | 2,846 | 2,870 | |

== Economy ==
Fishing has always been associated with Newbiggin, although later many inhabitants were employed in coal mining. By the Victorian era, Newbiggin was Northumberland's favourite seaside town, attracting hundreds of visitors every day in the summer months.

In 1869, there were 142 cobles (fishing boats) in Newbiggin-by-the-Sea.

Newbiggin Colliery was sunk in 1908. The colliery closed in 1967, but at its peak in 1940, 1,400 men were employed there. The former Newbiggin Colliery Band is now the Jayess Newbiggin Brass Band, named for its president and former member, cornet legend James Shepherd.

To date, there are 89 active companies based in Newbiggin.

== Landmarks ==
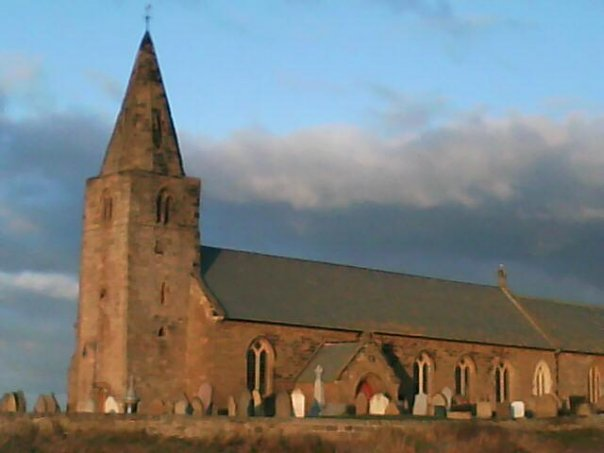
The 13th century Parish Church of St Bartholomew, Newbiggin-by-the-Sea

The town was at the end of the first telegraph cable from Scandinavia in 1868, and was laid from Jutland, Denmark. Attractions in Newbiggin today include the 13th-century parish church, and the flagship Newbiggin Maritime Centre, which has replaced the former heritage centre at a cost of £3 million.

The lifeboat station was opened in 1851 following a fishing disaster in which ten Newbiggin fishermen lost their lives in stormy seas. It is the oldest operational boathouse in the British Isles. Celebrating over 160 years as a lifeboat station, Newbiggin has had 13 different station lifeboats over the years; today it operates an inshore Atlantic 85 lifeboat. The crews have been presented with 16 awards for gallantry.

A £10 million renovation to rebuild and improve Newbiggin's rapidly eroding beach involved importing 500,000 tonnes of sand from Skegness, delivered by the trailing suction hopper dredger (TSHD) Oranje and deposited on the beach through a pipe approximately 1 metre (39 in) in diameter. A new offshore breakwater was installed to accompany the matching breakwater on the opposite side of the bay. Also installed is a brass statue by sculptor Sean Henry named Couple, anchored in the centre of the bay.

Newbiggin-by-the-Sea boasts the longest promenade in Northumberland. Each spring and autumn, the promenade becomes a prime location for naturalists watching the North Sea seabird migratory passage.

== Religious sites ==
The 13th century Parish Church of St Bartholomew, situated against a North Sea backdrop at Church Point, contains a notable collection of medieval gravestones. Eight complete cross slab grave covers have been reset in the walls of the north aisle which was rebuilt in 1912. The chancel, the east and western bays of arcades and the west tower are all 13th century, while the spire dates to the 14th century.

Woodhorn Church was once the mother church in the Parish of Woodhorn with Newbiggin. When it was declared redundant in 1973, that role passed to St Bartholomew's.

The Salvation Army has had a presence in Newbiggin-by-the-Sea since 1902 and its current premises consist of a worship hall on Front Street, opened in 1939, and a community hall on Vernon Place. The Salvation Army band features in the recollections of those who have grown up in Newbiggin or spent summer holidays there. Mary Heynes, who in her childhood was once head girl at the former West Junior School in Newbiggin, recalls that in the 1960s, "The Salvation Army would be on the Quay wall every Sunday doing a service and the band would play." In 1991 the Newbiggin-by-the-Sea Salvation Army Songster Brigade (the choir) recorded songs for BBC Radio.

St Mark's Church on Gibson Street was built in 1868 by the local stonemason William Gibson. Once a busy Presbyterian church, after the 1972 union of the Presbyterian and Congregational denominations in England St Mark's became a United Reformed church. St Mark's has now closed to worship. St Andrew's Methodist Chapel on Front Street was built in 1876. In 2010, the United Reformed and Methodist congregations in Newbiggin combined to form a single congregation in the South East Northumberland Ecumenical Area, meeting at St Andrew's which is now known as St Andrew's and St Mark's (Methodist/United Reformed) Church.

Prior to the building of St Andrew's in 1876, the Methodists used to meet in the Wesleyan Chapel on Robinson Square, which was built in 1844. In the early 20th century, the Robinson Square building was used by the Salvation Army before the Salvation Army acquired its current premises.

The Apostolic Church, whose beginnings can be traced to South Wales during the 1904-05 Welsh Revival, arrived in Newbiggin in 1936, initially hiring a room above the Co-operative store which still stands on Cleveland Terrace. Subsequently, the Apostolic Church acquired a building at 15–17 Gibson Street, but this closed to worship in 2010 and now houses the Newbiggin Boxing Club gym. After a long association with Newbiggin-by-the-Sea (Mary Heynes, former head girl of the West Junior School, reports that her father was an Apostolic preacher in the 1960s), the Apostolic Church now has no congregation in the town.

St Mary's Roman Catholic Church, a small building on Front Street, is part of the Parish of St Aidan's in Ashington.

== Summer fair ==
Until 2004 Newbiggin was host to a street fair that attracted thousands of people every year. In its final years, the fair was set out in the following format: starting at the beginning of the shopping area of Front Street, up to the Cresswell Arms pub flowing into Church Point car park and continuing along the seafront promenade. The lifeboat house and boatyard became the music venue. A stage replaced the boats and the lifeboat house opened its doors, serving food and afternoon tea. Appearances were made by Slade, Leo Sayer and TV show Gladiators star Michael Van Wijk.

Starting in 2010, the annual Old Ship Music Festival is attempting to bring back a summer event to the village. It invites bands from the region and worldwide to play, as well as local comedians, and raises money for charity with the help of local businesses. In 2010 it raised £700 for Help for Heroes, where in 2011, the chosen charity was the Sir Bobby Robson Foundation, and raised £1,100.

== Notable people ==
- John Braine was working at the library in Newbiggin (1954–56) when he wrote his best-selling novel Room at the Top.
- James Shepherd (1936–2023), principal cornet of the Black Dyke Band, was born in Newbiggin.
