= Woodhorn railway station =

Proposed station in Northumberland, England

Woodhorn

General information
- Location: Woodhorn, Northumberland; England
- Owner: Network Rail (assumed)
- Manager: Northern (assumed)
- Platforms: 2

Key dates
- 2021: Originally proposed opening date
- July 2019: Opening proposal dropped
- December 2025: Second proposal launched

Woodhorn is a proposed railway station in Ashington, Northumberland, England. The station was initially part of the project to reintroduce passenger rail services onto the Ashington, Blyth & Tyne Railway (since rechristened as the Northumberland Line) which closed to passenger traffic in 1964. It was thought that the newly reopened line could terminate at a new station, close to the Woodhorn Colliery Museum and Northumberland Archives, rather than at Ashington, the previous station however revised plans, released in July 2019 appear to have dropped Woodhorn station from project scope. If built, it will be the nearest station to Wansbeck General Hospital.

== Development ==
In the early 2010s, Northumberland County Council (NCC) became interested in restoring passenger services along the remaining freight-only section of the former Blyth and Tyne Railway between Benton Junction and Woodhorn. In June 2013 NCC commissioned Network Rail to complete a GRIP 1 study to examine the best options for the scheme. The GRIP 1 study was received by NCC in March 2014 and in June 2015 they initiated a more detailed GRIP 2 Feasibility Study at a cost of £850,000.

The GRIP 2 study, which NCC received in October 2016, confirmed that the reintroduction of a frequent seven-day a week passenger service between Newcastle and Ashington was feasible and could provide economic benefits of £70 million with more than 380,000 people using the line each year by 2034. The study suggested a new station should be built as a terminus of the newly reopened line. At the time it was suggested that, subject to funding being raised for the £191 million scheme, detailed design work could begin in October 2018 with construction commencing four months later and the first passenger services introduced in 2021 though by October 2018 such works were yet to begin.

After receiving the GRIP 2 study, NCC initially announced that they were preceding with a GRIP 3 Study from Network Rail but such a report was not commissioned at the time. Despite a change in the political leadership of Northumberland County Council following the 2017 local elections the authority continued to work towards the reintroduction of a passenger service onto the line, encouraged by the Department for Transport's November 2017 report, A Strategic Vision for Rail, which named the line as a possible candidate for a future reintroduction of passenger services. Consequentially, NCC commissioned a further interim study in November 2017 (dubbed GRIP 2B) to determine whether high costs and long timescales identified in the GRIP 2 Study could be reduced by reducing the initial scope of the project but the report failed to deliver on this.

Despite this, the county council has continued to develop the project, announcing a further £3.46 million in funding for a further business case and detailed design study (equivalent to GRIP 3) to be completed by the end of 2019. It is envisaged that passenger trains could be introduced as early as 2022. However, the revised proposals, released in July 2019, are reduced in scope from the plan considered in the 2016 GRIP 2 study and propose 4-phase project to reduce the initial cost of the scheme. Under these plans, the new station at Woodhorn appears to have been dropped in favour of creating new turn-back facilities at Ashington.

Provision has been made when building the Northumberland Line stations, especially at Ashington so that if there is a separate scheme, the line could be still be extended to Woodhorn and Newbiggin in future. As of the end of 2025, there were calls to resurrect the station as a park and ride scheme as well as extend the railway by 1.6km (1 mile) into the centre of Newbiggin-by-the-Sea. This will require new track and is all subject to a feasibility study. A formal bid was launched in December 2025 for this.

Preceding station	National Rail	Following station
	Proposed service	
Ashington; Line and station open	Northern; Ashington, Blyth and Tyne line	Newbiggin-by-the-Sea
