= Northumberland Line =

Railway route in north-east England

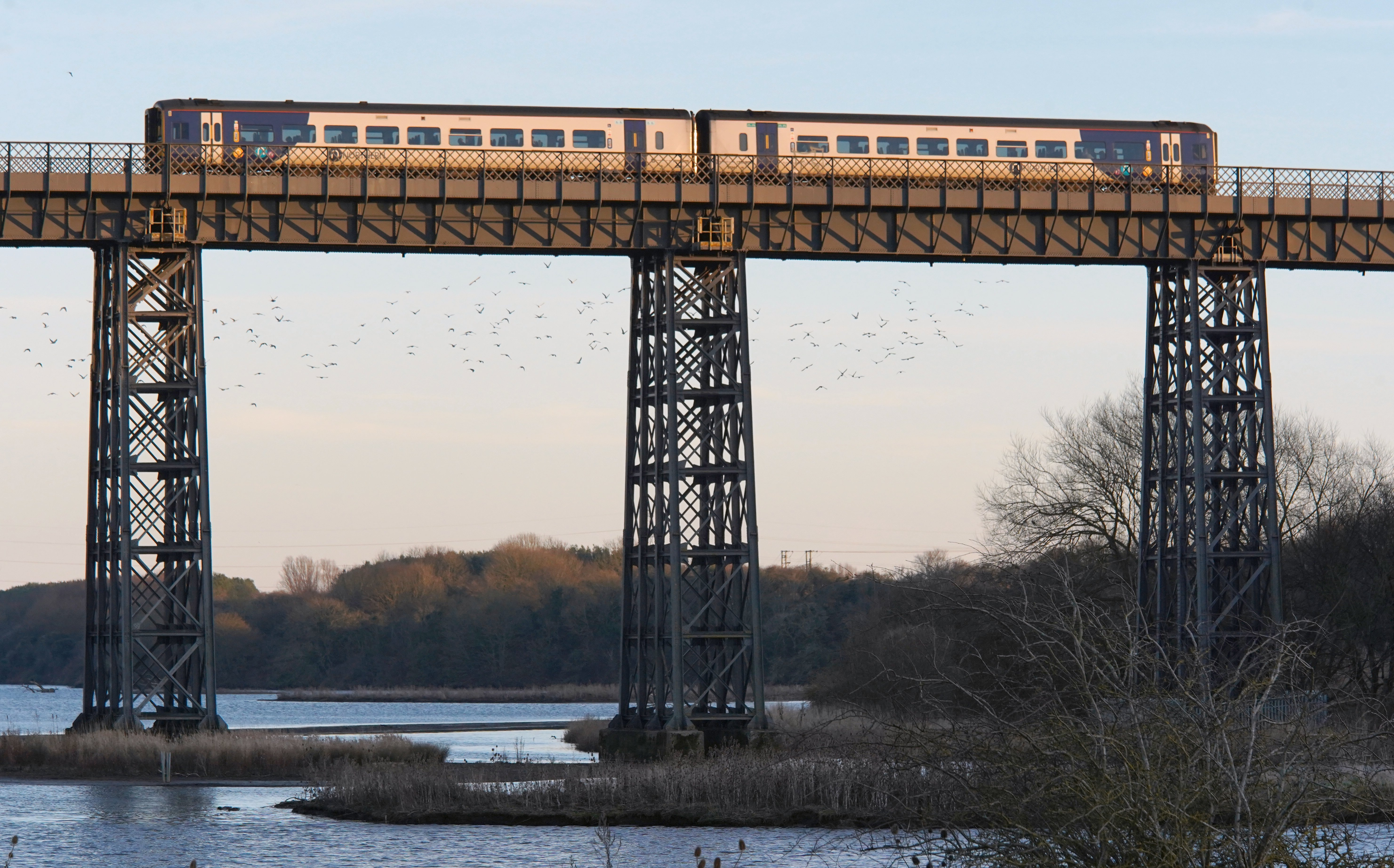
- A Class 158 crosses North Seaton Railway Bridge

Overview
- Status: Open
- Owner: Network Rail
- Locale: Northumberland, Tyne and Wear
- Termini: North: Ashington, South: Newcastle
- Stations: 8
- Website: https://www.northumberlandline.uk/

Service
- Type: Heavy rail
- System: National Rail
- Operator: Northern Trains

History
- Opened: 15 December 2024

Technical
- Line length: 18 mi (29 km)
- Track gauge: 4 ft 8 1/2 in (1,435 mm) standard gauge
Route map
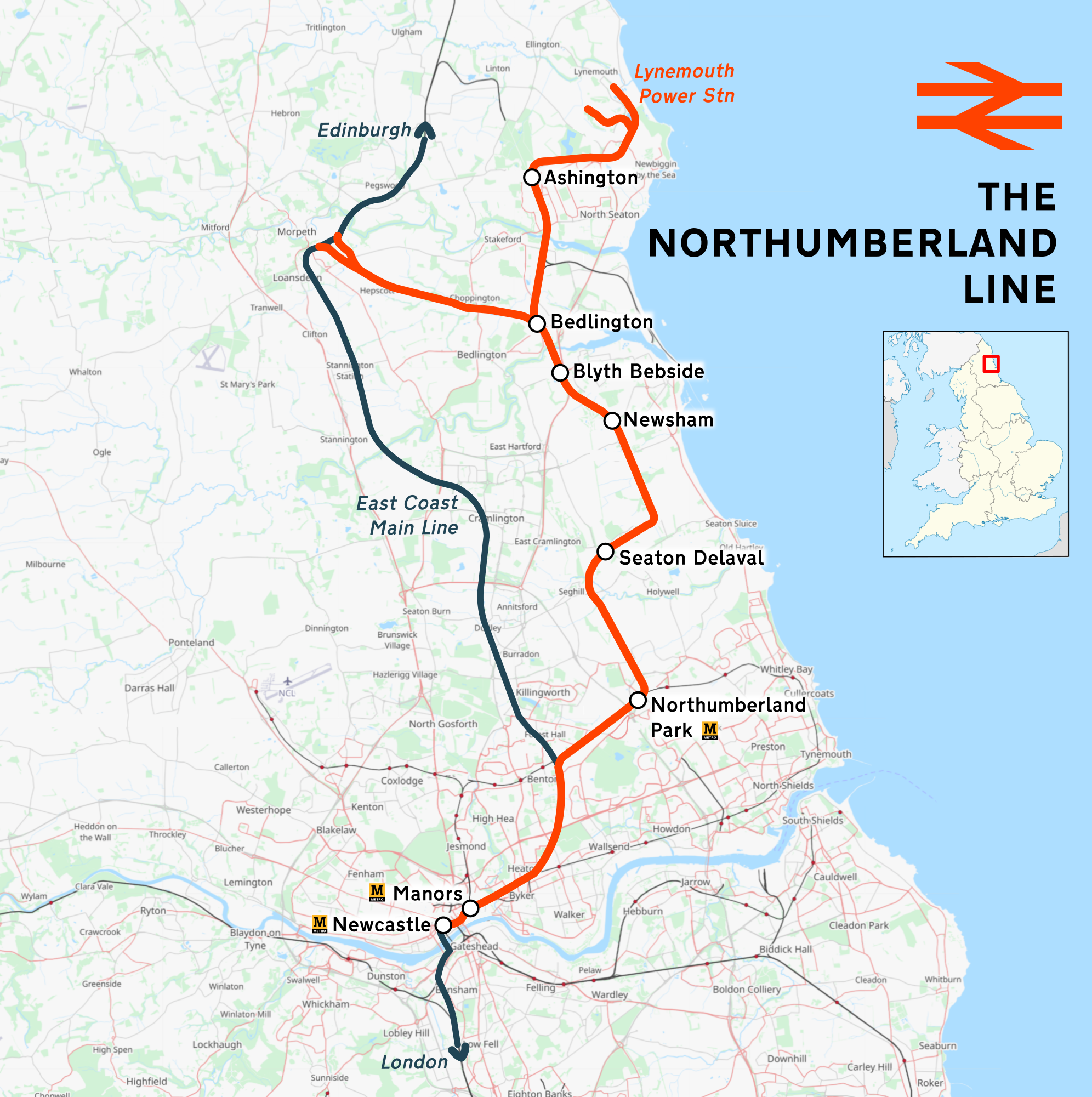

The Northumberland Line is a railway route in North East England. Services are operated by Northern Trains and link some of south-east Northumberland's major population centres in Ashington, Bedlington and Blyth to the nearby city of Newcastle upon Tyne. Passenger services were reintroduced in 2024 after 60 years as a freight-only line.

The line was originally part of the Blyth and Tyne Railway system, a once-extensive railway network that covered much of south-east Northumberland. Passenger services ceased in 1964, when they were withdrawn as part of the Beeching cuts. Construction of new stations and works to upgrade the existing rail infrastructure to enable resumption of passenger traffic began in August 2022, with the first trains running in December 2024 between Ashington and Newcastle. Further stations opened in 2025, and the final stations opened in early 2026.

== History ==
=== Original line and closure ===
The Blyth and Tyne Railway (B&TR) was incorporated in 1853 to unify several small independent railways and waggonways that had been constructed in the region since the 18th century to enable efficient transport of coal from the south-east Northumberland Coalfield to ports at Blyth and on the River Tyne. As coal production increased during the remainder of the 19th and early 20th centuries, the network of railway lines in this part of the region under the control of this company and its successors continued to expand, reaching what would become Ashington and Newbiggin by 1872. Though generally a secondary concern, passenger services had been operated on this network since the 1840s, but this traffic would greatly expand from the 1860s when the company (and its successors) began to develop a network of commuter railways connecting the existing system to central Newcastle. Following the amalgamation of the B&TR into the North Eastern Railway in 1874, the succeeding company incorporated these more southerly commuter railways into the North Tyneside Loop which, in 1904, was electrified.

Faced with declining patronage during the first half of the 20th century, passenger services were withdrawn from the more northerly parts of the network (serving Blyth, Bedlington, Ashington and Newbiggin) on 30 July 1964 as part of the Beeching cuts, but much of this part of the system was retained for mineral traffic serving local collieries. While the remainder of the surviving passenger network fared better, remaining passenger traffic was insufficient to justify the considerable expenditure required to renew the electrical systems and rolling stock on the electrified sections of the network and, consequentially, these routes were converted to diesel traction in 1967. However, in the 1970s, renewed interest in suburban rail led to the incorporation of the North Tyneside Loop into the electrified Tyne and Wear Metro. As part of this conversion, a parallel third freight line was added alongside the Loop's existing passenger lines between Benton Junction (where they meet the East Coast Main Line) and the site of Backworth station (just east of the site of the modern Northumberland Park station) where the freight line towards Bedlington diverges.

Nonetheless, remaining freight traffic on the network gradually declined during the late 20th century as local collieries were closed. As of 2022, around five freight services a day were operating the branch, providing the biomass (former coal-fired) power station at Lynemouth, at the northern end of the line, with wood chips from the Port of Tyne.

=== 1990–2010: Proposed reopenings ===
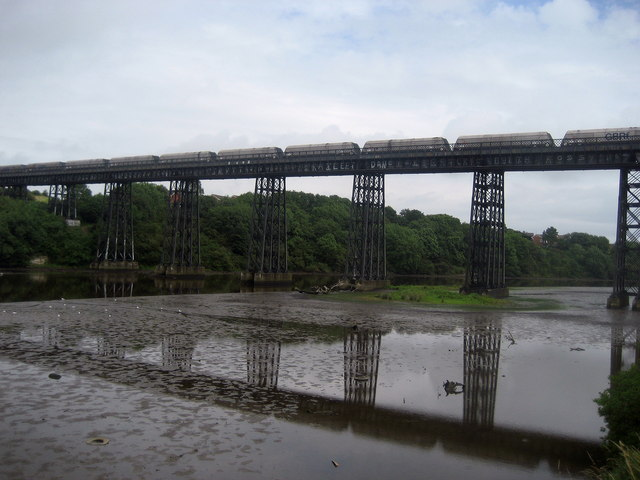
Between 1964 and 2024, the line only carried freight trains

There have been proposals to reintroduce passenger services to part of the ex-B&TR system since the 1990s. Denis Murphy, the then Labour MP for Wansbeck, expressed support in the House of Commons in an adjournment debate in April 1999 and again in a debate in January 2007. The Railway Development Society (renamed Railfuture in 2000) endorsed the proposal in 1998.

The South East Northumberland Rail User Group began a campaign to reopen the remaining freight lines between Benton Junction, Morpeth, Bedlington and Ashington in March 2005. In an effort to draw attention to their campaign, the group chartered a Northern Rail Class 156 diesel multiple unit to run three return trips along the lines on 7 June 2008; the first train carryied local politicians and other key stakeholders, with the other two carrying fare-paying public passengers. In 2009, the Association of Train Operating Companies published a £34 million proposal to restore passenger services to the north-eastern part of the B&TR system. It would have included reopening stations at Seaton Delaval, Bedlington, Newsham (for Blyth) and Ashington.

=== 2013–2017: Initial plans and the Ashington, Blyth & Tyne Line project ===
In the early 2010s, Northumberland County Council became interested in the reintroduction of passenger services onto remaining freight-only sections of the network. In June 2013, NCC commissioned Network Rail to complete a GRIP 1 study to examine the best options for the scheme. NCC received the GRIP 1 study in March 2014 and it commissioned a more detailed GRIP 2 feasibility study at a cost of £850,000 in June 2015.

The GRIP 2 study, which NCC received in October 2016, confirmed that the reintroduction of a frequent seven-day a week passenger service between Newcastle and Ashington was feasible and could provide economic benefits of £70 million with more than 380,000 people using the line each year by 2034. The 2016 GRIP 2 study envisaged a project (at the time referred to as the Ashington, Blyth & Tyne Line), at an estimated cost of £191 million, involving construction of new or reopened stations at Northumberland Park (for interchange with the Tyne and Wear Metro), either Seghill or Seaton Delaval, Newsham, Blyth Park & Ride, Bedlington, Ashington and Woodhorn (for the Woodhorn Colliery Museum and Northumberland Archives) with a potential end-to-end journey time of 37 minutes.

After receiving the GRIP 2 study, NCC initially announced that it was proceeding with a GRIP 3 Study from Network Rail, but such a report was not commissioned at that time. Despite a change in the political leadership of Northumberland County Council following the 2017 local elections, the authority continued to work towards the reintroduction of a passenger service onto the line, encouraged by the Department for Transport's (DfT) November 2017 report, A Strategic Vision for Rail, which named the line as a possible candidate for a future reintroduction of passenger services. Eventually, NCC commissioned a further interim study in November 2017 (dubbed GRIP 2B) to determine whether high costs and long timescales identified in the GRIP 2 Study could be reduced by reducing the initial scope of the project, but the report failed to identify any feasible such cost or time savings.

=== 2019–present: Revised plans and the Northumberland Line project ===
The county council, however, continued to develop the project and hired AECOM and SLC Rail as contractors to develop the scheme on their behalf in 2018. On 8 February 2019, the council chartered a train from Northern that carried the then Secretary of State for Transport Chris Grayling and other dignitaries over part of the route (now rechristened the Northumberland Line) between Morpeth and Newsham, after which NCC announced an additional £3.46 million in funding for a further business case and detailed design study (equivalent to GRIP 3) to be completed by the end of 2019.

Revised proposals, released in July 2019, were reduced in scope from the plan considered in the 2016 GRIP 2 study and proposed a four-phase project to reduce the initial cost; the first phase, at an estimated £90 million, was to introduce an hourly passenger service to serve new or reopened stations at Northumberland Park, Newsham, Bedlington and Ashington and would have included some line-speed upgrades, extension of the double track section further to the south of Newsham, creation of turn-back facilities at Ashington and some level crossing upgrades or closures. Two further stations, at Seaton Delaval and Blyth Bebside (formerly dubbed Blyth Park & Ride), and additional line-speed improvements were suggested for Phase 2, while Phase 3 would have delivered further line-speed and signalling improvements and Phase 4 would have created an additional passing-loop at Seaton Delaval so as to enable the provision of a half-hourly service. Previously proposed stations at Woodhorn and Seghill had been dropped from the scheme by this time. In August 2020, it was reported that consideration was being given to merging the four proposed phases announced in 2019 into one and, as of June 2022, this combined option appeared to have been adopted.

The then Minister for Railways, Chris Heaton-Harris, announced an initial UK Government grant of £1.5 million towards the project costs during a visit to the site of Bedlington station in January 2020 which was supplemented by an allocation of £10 million of funds from Northumberland County Council the following month. This funding enabled AECOM to begin detailed on-site ground investigation works in October 2020. The allocation of a further £34 million of UK Government funding for the project in January 2021 enabled the necessary land to be purchased, detailed designs to be prepared and some early preparatory and site works to begin. In January 2021, it was anticipated that the UK Government would fund the remainder of the project cost, estimated at £166 million as of January 2021, once the final phase of design works were completed, but, by June 2022, the release of the bulk of this funding had yet to be announced.

During 2021, planning applications were submitted for the proposed stations: for Northumberland Park and Ashington in February; for Blyth Bebside and Bedlington in March; for Seaton Delaval in June; and for Newsham in September. All of these applications had been approved by 3 March 2022. A further planning application was submitted for the replacement of a pedestrian crossing in Ashington with an underpass, on 24 September 2021, but strong local opposition meant that, as of June 2022, it was unclear whether this would ultimately be built as part of the project. Northumberland County Council also submitted a complementary Transport and Works Act Order application to the UK Department for Transport on 26 May 2021, under which they would be conferred certain additional powers (including those relating to compulsory purchasing of land, temporary use of land, closure of level crossings and diversion of highways) deemed necessary for the new stations to be constructed and the line upgraded to carry regular passenger services. The order was granted, subject to some modifications, on 27 June 2022.

The first preliminary infrastructure works implemented as part of this project – renewal of 600 yards (550 m) of track near Newsham – were completed in June 2021. In August 2021, Morgan Sindall was awarded a £40 million contract to undertake detailed design and construction works for the new stations and footbridges, as well as the major track upgrade works associated with the project. Following the aforementioned granting of the Transport and Works Act Order and most of the required planning permissions, main-stage construction work was reported as having begun by late August 2022, ahead of the anticipated launch of the new passenger service in December 2023.

In the winter of 2023/2024, it was reported that despite services planning to begin in summer 2024, only Ashington, Newsham and Seaton Delaval would open at the start of services. It was likely that Bedlington, Blyth Bebside and Northumberland Park will not open until 2025. As of August 2024, the initial services and stations were delayed again to December 2024, with the whole project's final cost being £298.5 million, £130 million more than the initial bid. However, in November 2024, citing difficulties with power, engineering and regulations, Newsham's opening was delayed further until early 2025, leaving Ashington and Seaton Delaval as the only new stations to open at the line's start.

Passenger service on the line began on 15 December 2024 with the opening of Ashington and Seaton Delaval. Newsham followed suit four months later on 17 March 2025. Blyth Bebside opened on 19 October 2025.

The remaining two stations were due to open in early 2026. Northumberland Park was first announced as to open on 22 February 2026, with Bedlington later opening on 29 March 2026. In February RAIL magazine reported that the opening of the two stations had been delayed by "poor weather and various engineering challenges".

In January 2026, it was reported that one million journeys had been made on the line since its re-opening. By October, that figure had risen to two million, with Northern Trains running 416 trains per week, with longer trains at peak times.

== Stations ==
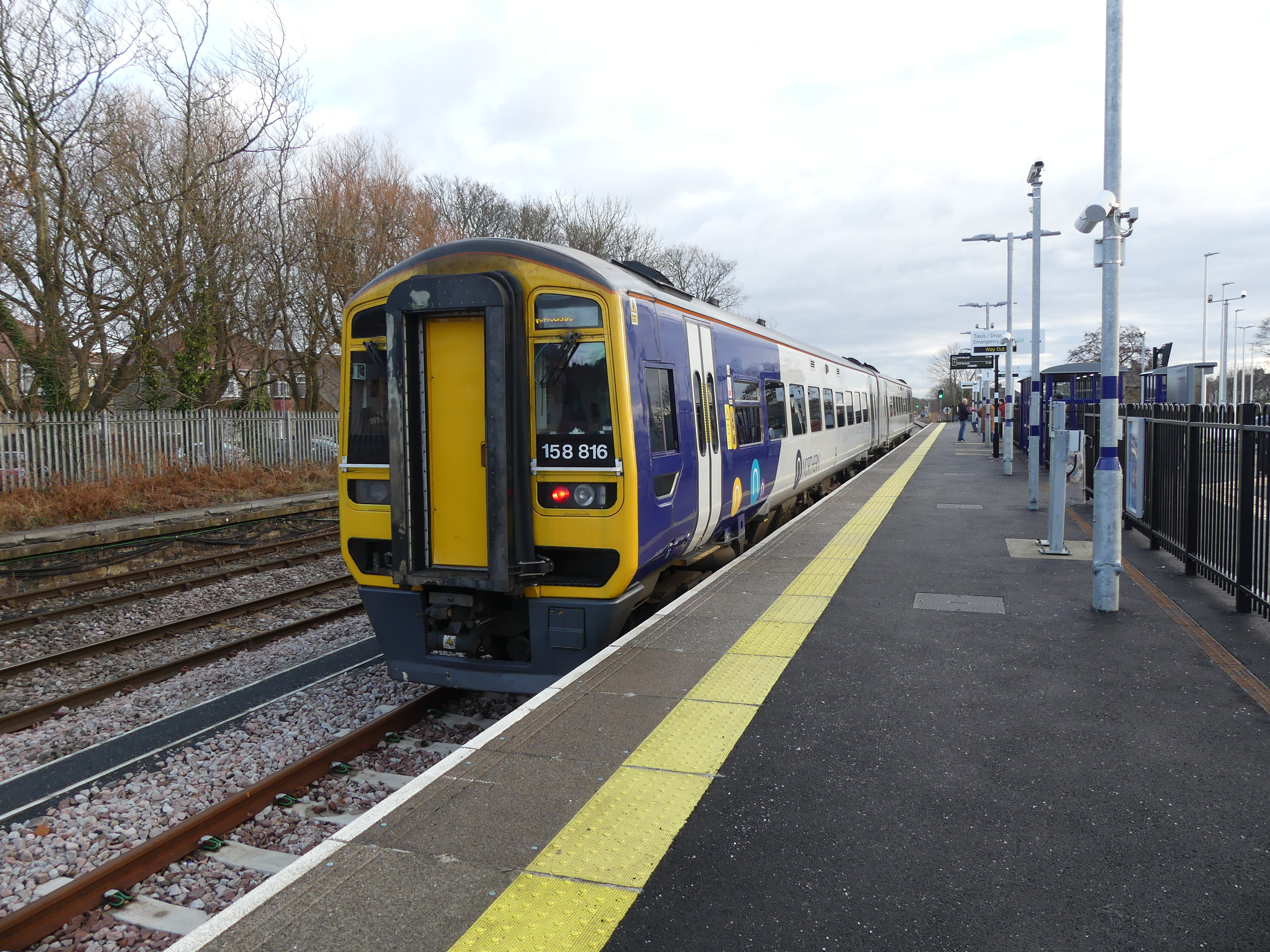
The rebuilt Ashington railway station in 2025

The newly established passenger service begins at Newcastle, before heading north along the East Coast Main Line to Benton Junction, with an intermediate stop at the existing Manors station. At Benton Junction, Northumberland Line trains join the former freight-only line, which parallels the Yellow line of the Tyne and Wear Metro, becoming single track just before Palmersville Metro station, before calling at a new National Rail platform adjacent to the existing Northumberland Park station. Just east of Northumberland Park station, the new passenger service leaves the current Metro line corridor, following the former freight line as it curves away to the north towards Northumberland returning to double track immediately before Newsham. Passing along this line, it serves the following new or reopened stations, from south to north:

- Seaton Delaval
- Newsham
- Blyth Bebside
- Bedlington
- Ashington

== Service ==
Passenger service runs every 30 minutes between 6:00 am and 7:30 pm Monday to Saturday, with hourly services provided in the evenings and all-day on Sundays. The passenger service has an end-to-end journey time of 36 minutes. The initial services in December 2024 called at Seaton Delaval and Ashington (Newsham is now also observed), with some also stopping at Manors, and with journey times of 34-37 minutes.

== Future proposals ==
Ashington station has been developed in such a way that an extension, such as that previously proposed to Newbiggin-by-the-Sea and Woodhorn could still be built, albeit part of a separate scheme. As of the end of 2025, there were calls to resurrect Woodhorn as a park and ride scheme as well as extend the railway by 1.6 km (1 mile) into the centre of Newbiggin-by-the-Sea. This will require new track and is all subject to a feasibility study. A formal bid was launched in December 2025 for this.
