= Morgan Sindall =

British construction & regeneration company

Morgan Sindall Group plc
- Formerly: Morgan Sindall plc (1994–2010); William Sindall Public Limited Company (1953–1994)
- Type: Public
- Traded as: LSE: MGNS; FTSE 250 component
- Industry: Construction, Civil engineering
- Founded: 1977
- Headquarters: London, United Kingdom
- Key people: Michael Findlay (Chairman); John Morgan (Chief Executive); Steve Crummett (Finance Director)
- Revenue: ▲£5,018.6 million (2025)
- Operating income: ▲£224.9 million (2025)
- Net income: ▲£174.9 million (2025)
- Number of employees: 8,500 (2025)
- Website: morgansindall.com

Morgan Sindall Group plc is a UK construction and regeneration company, headquartered in London employing around 6,700 employees and operating in the public, regulated and private sectors. It operates through three divisions: Fit Out, Construction Services, and Partnerships. It is listed on the London Stock Exchange and is a constituent of the FTSE 250 Index.

== History ==
The company was established under the name Morgan Lovell by its founders, John Morgan and Jack Lovell, in 1977; it initially had £1,000 in capital and was based at Golden Square in Soho. Overbury, a fit out contractor which had been in business since 1942, was acquired by the company during 1985; rebranded as Morgan Lovell and Overbury, the company quickly expanded throughout the UK around this time.

During 1994, Morgan Lovell and Overbury secured a listing on the London Stock Exchange via a £13.5 million reverse takeover of the regional construction company William Sindall plc. William Sindall had been established in the 1860s, and was named after its founder, who was known for his work on behalf of the University of Cambridge. During July 1988, William Sindall had acquired Hinkins & Frewin, a company established in 1847, known for their work for the University of Oxford. The business operated from offices in Oxford, Cambridge, Banbury, Rugby and Fareham. While its share price had trended positively throughout the 1980s, William Sindall's fiscal health soured in the 1990s, incurring routine losses and making it vulnerable to takeover.

Following the reverse takeover, the combined company was named Morgan Sindall; the positions of chairman and chief executive were both filled by John Morgan. The losses incurred by William Sindall before the merger worked to the firm's advantage to reduce its tax liabilities for some time thereafter. By the mid 1990s, the majority of Morgan Sindall's work was coming from large blue chip customers, such as Man Group, Bank of America, Standard Life and Thorn EMI.

By February 1996, Morgan Sindall made a pre-tax profit of £3.03 million; one year later, it announced a 71 percent rise in pre-tax profits. The firm then embarked on a series of acquisitions. During 1998, Morgan Sindall bought Lovell Partnerships from the financially stretched Lovell Group in exchange for £15 million; the business was one of the largest partnership housing operations in the UK and also had its own private housebuilding division.

During August 2000, management of the firm, which had a market value of just over £100m, was debt-free and had 38 percent of its shares owned by board members, stated their ambitions to double turnover within four years and to expand the company's scope by 50 percent. In May 2001, the company purchased Carillion's social housing division. One year later, the company stated that it would not undertake further acquisitions for a while; furthermore, the company's order book exceeded £1 billion in value at this time.

In June 2007, Morgan Sindall purchased the construction arm of AMEC; this acquisition later proved to be problematic, leading to a £15 million write-off and legal action between the two firms over project liability. During September 2009, Morgan Sindall was fined £287,000 by the Office of Fair Trading for its involvement in cover pricing activities; the company subsequently announced that it had carried out a comprehensive review of its activities.

During September 2010, it purchased the repairs division of Connaught plc, saving 2,500 jobs in the process. In 2011, despite a sustained and sharp downturn in public spending amid the Great Recession, the firm's turnover exceeded £1 billion.

In early 2020, the company announced that it would be directing its resources into its housing division and did not plan to make any acquisitions in the foreseeable future. However, by 2024, Morgan Sindall was once again publicly interested in acquisition opportunities, while substantial sums also continued to be invested into housing.

In February 2026, Morgan Sindall announced annual revenue of £5.02bn for the year to 31 December 2025, and a pre-tax profit lof £233m.

== Strategy and operations ==
Morgan Sindall Group is a construction company and regeneration group operating in the public and commercial sectors. It operates through three divisions which are fit out, construction services and partnerships. Cash generated from the fit out and construction businesses are invested in partnerships, for example building homes with local authorities and mixed use regeneration projects.

== Major projects ==
Major projects included Murray Royal Hospital in Perth, completed in 2012, the expansion of Whitechapel station for Crossrail, completed in 2021, and construction of six new stations on the Northumberland Line completed in 2024.

In September 2026, Morgan Sindall was named as one of the construction companies involved in the development of Universal United Kingdom, which is due to be completed in 2031.

== Subsidiaries ==
Morgan Sindall Group plc own a number of subsidiaries, including:

Subsidiary name	Area of business
Morgan Sindall Construction	Education, healthcare, commercial, industrial, leisure and retail markets
Morgan Sindall Infrastructure	Highways, rail, energy, water and nuclear
BakerHicks	Architectural and engineering design consultancy
Overbury	Office and further education fit out and refurbishment
Morgan Lovell	Design and build office fit out
Morgan Sindall Property Services	Property repairs for the social housing sector
Lovell Homes	House builder
Lovell Partnerships	Partnership housing
Muse Places	Mixed-use urban regeneration
