= Blyth Power Station =

Thermal Power Station in England

Blyth power stations
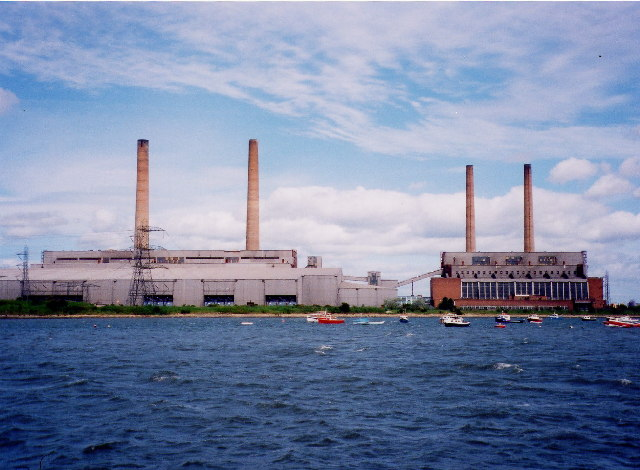
- Blyth A (right) and B (left) power stations, viewed from the south bank of the River Blyth in June 2000
- Official name: Blyth A & B power station
- Country: England
- Location: Blyth
- Coordinates: 55°8′30″N 1°31′43″W
- Status: Demolished and awaiting redevelopment
- Construction began: 1955 (A station); 1961 (B station)
- Commission date: 1958-60 (A station); 1962-66 (B station)
- Decommission date: 1991-2001
- Owners: Central Electricity Generating Board (1958-1990); National Power (1990-2000); Innogy plc (2000-2001)

Thermal power station
- Primary fuel: Bituminous coal

Power generation
- Make and model: Metropolitan-Vickers; English Electric
- Units decommissioned: A station: 4× 120 MW; B station: 2× 275 MW; 2× 350 MW
- Nameplate capacity: 1960: 480 MW; 1966: 1,730 MW; 1991: 1,180 MW

External links
- Commons: Related media on Commons

Blyth Power Station (also known as Cambois Power Station) refers to a pair of now demolished coal-fired power stations, which were located on the Northumberland coast in North East England. The two stations were built alongside each other on a site near Cambois in Northumberland, on the northern bank of the River Blyth, between its tidal estuary and the North Sea. The stations took their name from the town of Blyth on the opposite bank of the estuary. Blyth A Power Station was built and opened first but had a smaller generating capacity than its sister station, Blyth B Power Station, which was built to its west four years later. The power stations' four large chimneys were a landmark of the Northumberland skyline for over 40 years; the A Station's two chimneys each stood at 140 metres (460 ft); the B Station's two chimneys were taller, at 170 metres (560 ft) each.

Construction of the B Station began shortly after the A station was completed. The stations were built during a period in which there were great advances in power station technology, and in the scale of production, which led to them having a variety of intermediate generator set sizes along with a mix of design styles. Blyth A had a generating capacity of 480 megawatts (MW) and the B Station 1,250 MW. Their combined capacity of 1,730 MW briefly made Blyth Power Station the largest electricity generation site in England, until Ferrybridge C Power Station came into full operation in 1966. The stations were capable of generating enough electricity to power 300,000 homes.

The A Station first generated electricity in 1958, a year after the creation of the Central Electricity Generating Board, and the stations operated until 2001. They were operated by the successors of the CEGB, including National Power, following the privatisation of the UK's power industry. After their closure in 2001, the stations were demolished over the course of two years, ending with the demolition of the stations' chimneys on 7 December 2003. RWE Npower proposed the construction of a clean coal-fired power station on the site, but the plans were postponed. In December 2020, the site was confirmed as the location for a new automotive battery manufacturing plant.

== History ==
=== Background ===
Following the Second World War the demand for electricity increased in the United Kingdom. In North East England, this led to the construction of two new power stations at Stella, along with the expansion of stations at Dunston and Billingham, to meet the demand for power quickly. At Blyth, a larger and more efficient plant was planned, consisting of six 100 megawatts (MW) generating units. This increased to six 120 MW units, before increasing again in the final proposal for an A station consisting of four 120 MW units and a B station consisting of two 275 MW units and two 350 MW units. This gave the A and B stations generating capacities of 480 MW and 1,250 MW respectively. The first generating set at Blyth A was commissioned in December 1958 and the other sets in 1959–60. In the 1960s Blyth A was in the CEGB's list of the 20 power stations with the highest thermal efficiencies. The electricity output, load and thermal efficiency are shown the following table.

Blyth A output and thermal efficiency
Year ended 31 March	1960	1961	1962	1963	1964	1965	1966	1972	1979	1982
Electricity supplied, GWh	1,380	2,455	3,266	3,379	3,401	3,071	3,242	2,977	2,958	2,654
Average load as % of maximum output	64	66.3	83.2	86.11	86.4	78.2	82.6	75.7	75.4	67.6
Thermal efficiency %	34.31	34.11	34.30	34.55	34.68	34.39	34.62	34.36	33.11	34.35

Annual output of Blyth A power station, GWh

The Blyth Power Stations were to be an experiment, using a variety of generating set sizes at a time when engineers were trying to standardise power station plant and layout. Blyth was the first in the UK to use generating sets larger than the then standard 30 MW and 60 MW. The station's location was chosen because of its position within the super grid, rather than to be near a load centre.

The site chosen for the construction of the power stations was close to the coal mining town of Cambois. Ordnance Survey maps as far back as 1860 show that before building work began the land had been used as open farmland, with fields of varying shapes and sizes.

=== Construction ===
Permission for Blyth A Power Station to be built was granted in February 1955, and its construction took place between 1955 and 1960. The station's first unit went into operation in December 1958, and the A Station was fully operational by June 1960. Its four 120 MW sets were the first commissioned in Britain of what became for a time that standardised size. The construction of the B Station began on 4 December 1961. Its first unit was commissioned in December 1962, and the rest of the station was fully operational by September 1966. The station had a total generating capacity of 1,730 MW, the highest of any site in the UK until later in the same year, when Ferrybridge C Power Station came into full operation. Blyth B was the first power station in Britain to have 275 MW sets installed. Its two 350 MW sets were an intermediate stage toward the 500 MW standard, so very few of the 350 MW sets were ever commissioned in the UK. Both of the stations were designed by L J Couves & Partners. They were engineered by Merz & McLellan and built by the Cleveland Bridge Company.

== Design and specification ==
The large 98-hectare (240-acre) site was separated by Bedlington-Cambois Road, with the stations' main buildings, admin blocks and ash dock to the south of the road, and coal storage area and railway sidings to the north. The ground to the south of this road consisted of a 21-metre (69 ft) thick layer of boulder clay, overlaying sandstone and coal. The main foundations of the buildings were spread out, giving a load of about 2.3 tonnes (2.264 long tons; 2.535 short tons) per square foot.

Each of the stations featured large boiler houses, turbine halls, switch houses, flue gas cleaning plant and a pair of concrete chimneys. Blyth A's chimneys stood at 140 metres (460 ft) and Blyth B's chimneys stood at 170 metres (560 ft), major landmarks on the South East Northumberland skyline. Each chimney weighed approximately 17,000 tonnes (16,730 long tons; 18,740 short tons). The prominence and large scale of the buildings in the surrounding flat rural area, was the subject of much contemporary architectural debate. Blyth A's turbine hall was 120 metres (390 ft) long by 37 metres (121 ft) wide, and 26 metres (85 ft) high. It was built from a reinforced concrete frame, clad with brickwork. It housed four 120 MW Metropolitan-Vickers 3,000 rpm turbo generators, each connected to a Babcock & Wilcox boiler, situated in the boiler house. Each boiler and generator set operated independently, with no connections to other sets. Coal fed into the boilers was pulverised by a Babcock & Wilcox pulveriser, fed by a coal bunker with a capacity of 2,000 tonnes (1,968 long tons; 2,205 short tons). Each pulveriser was capable of pulverising 15 tonnes (14.76 long tons; 16.53 short tons) of coal an hour, sufficient to keep its associated boiler at full output. The boiler house was 110 metres (360 ft) long by 28 metres (92 ft) wide and 48 metres (157 ft) high. It was built from a steel frame with aluminium cladding. The A station's design was an unusual mix of styles; the brick construction of the turbine hall was a style used more often in the 1950s, while the aluminium and glass cladding boiler house was a construction style used more in the 1960s. The A Station housed two control rooms, each of which served two generating sets and contained the controls to operate boilers, turbo generators and auxiliary plant. The A Station's switchgear was provided by A. Reyrolle & Company.

Blyth B's turbine hall was 206 metres (676 ft) long by 51 metres (167 ft) wide and 30 metres (98 ft) high. It housed two 275 MW and two 350 MW English Electric 3,000 rpm turbo generators, each connected to a Clarke Chapman & Co boiler, situated in the boiler house. The boiler house was 206 metres (676 ft) long by 32 metres (105 ft) wide and 52 metres (171 ft) high. The coal fed into the boilers was pulverised by a Babcock & Wilcox pulveriser. Each pulveriser was capable of pulverising 40 tonnes (39.37 long tons; 44.09 short tons) of coal an hour, and two pulverisers fed each boiler. There were two boilers rated at 227 kg/s steam production and two boilers rated at 280 k/g/s. For all four boilers the steam pressure was 158.58 bar and 566°C and 566°C reheat. Both the turbine hall and boiler house were built from a steel frame, clad with aluminium and glazing. The roofs of the B Station's buildings were made from a lightweight aluminium decking. The B Station's switchgear was provided by A. Reyrolle & Company and by M&C Switchgear. The volume of Blyth B's main buildings represented 0.76 cubic metres (27 cu ft)/kW of installed capacity, while Blyth A's building volume represented 0.74 cubic metres (26 cu ft)/kW.

== Operations ==
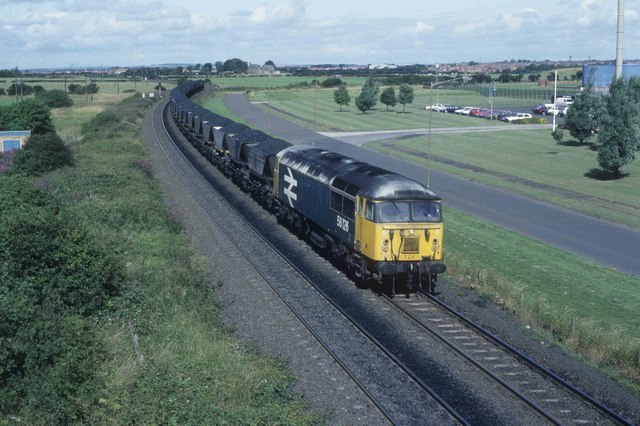
A train of coal is delivered to the station

=== Coal transportation ===
The stations burned a mix of bituminous and anthracite coal. They consumed 51,000 tonnes (50,190 long tons; 56,220 short tons) of coal per week and had a peak consumption of 70,000 tonnes (68,890 long tons; 77,160 short tons) per week during the winter. They were well positioned to use coal from the Northumberland and County Durham coal fields. All of the coal used in the stations was brought to them via rail transport from UK coal stocks. Trains delivered coal to the station using the North Blyth Branch of the Blyth and Tyne Railway. The stations' coal handling facility was fitted with a Merry go Round (MGR) coal delivery system in 1981, after high capacity rapid discharge waggons became the British Rail standard. This system involved the trains slowly passing over a hopper and automatically discharging their cargo through doors underneath the train. Because of site space restrictions, a balloon loop track layout could not be constructed, so instead of being able to move continuously, trains arriving on site had to pull onto a reception track; the locomotive would then uncouple and recouple at the opposite end, before slowly moving over the unloading track hopper and discharging the coal and eventually leaving site. Towards the end of the station's operation, coal was more frequently brought in by road. All coal was delivered to and stored in a large open area to the north of the power stations. This had a tarmac barrier underneath it to prevent downward contamination. The coal was brought from the storage area to the station using a system of conveyor belts, which travelled over the Bedlington-Cambois Road separating the two sites, before being integrated to feed both stations as necessary.

=== Cooling system ===
Water is essential to a thermal power station, to create the steam to turn the steam turbines and generate electricity. Water used in the power station at Blyth was extracted from the Blyth Harbour tidal basin at the ash dock. Once used in the station, the hot water had to be cooled before it could be discharged. Condensers were used to convert steam from the turbines back into water. The stations' condensers were of twin two-pass design and had a total cooling surface of 70,000 square feet (6,500 m^{2}). Condensed water was then extracted by two duty pumps. The water then passed through a drains cooler. The cooled waste water was discharged into the sea off Cambois beach below low tide level.

=== Ash removal ===
Pulverised Fuel Ash (PFA) and Furnace Bottom Ash (FBA) were byproducts produced through the burning of coal in the station. Bottom ash was removed from ash hoppers at the bottom of the boilers by high pressure water jets. It then travelled to ash settling ponds via sluiceways. For much of the station's life, the station was served by a series of barges, which took the ash to dump 4.8 kilometres (3.0 mi) out into the North Sea. Two barges provided this service over the years; Sir Fon which was superseded by the MVA. The barges were loaded by silos situated at a special dock to the east of the stations. However, dumping in the sea stopped in 1992 when the International Convention for the Prevention of Pollution from Ships prevented further dumping in the North Sea. From then on FBA was sold to the construction industry, while PFA was either dried for sale, or was disposed of at a licensed landfill on-site.

== Closure and demolition ==
=== Closure ===
In 1989, Blyth A won a place in the Guinness Book of Records by setting the world record for total running hours in a plant of its size, when all four generating units achieved 200,000 running hours. With the privatisation of the UK's electricity supply industry in 1990, the station passed into the ownership of National Power. In 1991, the two 275 MW units at Blyth B (units 5 & 6) were decommissioned on the grounds of economy, despite the station having been modernised in the early 1980s. This decommissioning resulted in 260 job losses.

During the 1990s, the station became one of the UK's least efficient power stations. In 1998, plans were announced to use the station as a test-bed for clean coal technology, but the plans did not come to fruition. In 1999, then owners Innogy plc decided to take Blyth A out of operation, while Blyth B began operating only at times of peak demand, because the stations had become surplus to their generating needs. From 1 April 2000 onwards the station was taken out of service for the summer months, because of the low demand for electricity at that time of year. However, staff were retained to maintain the station. Innogy plc then began looking for a buyer for the station, to decide the site's future. They had been in talks with American-based NRG Energy, over a £410 million purchase of the station, along with the Killingholme Power Station in North Lincolnshire. There had also been rumours that a deal had been made to convert the station into a waste-to-energy plant. However, any plans to save the station fell through and the generation of electricity at the station ceased on 31 January 2001, after 43 years of operating, resulting in the loss of 131 jobs.

At the time of its closure, Blyth Power Station was the oldest coal-fired power station in Britain. The station long outlived its life expectancy of 25 years. The length of time that the station was in use is partly due to its value in the National Grid, as a "charge" near to a major node in the system.

Shortly after its closure, a joint proposal was made by the British Army and the Ministry of Agriculture to burn the carcasses of animals slaughtered during the 2001 foot-and-mouth crisis in portable incinerators at the station. The station was proposed because of its high chimneys, but strong opposition from local residents and Members of Parliament, along with the proximity of over 100,000 people living within 5 kilometres (3 mi) of the site, meant that the proposal was quickly rejected.

=== Demolition ===
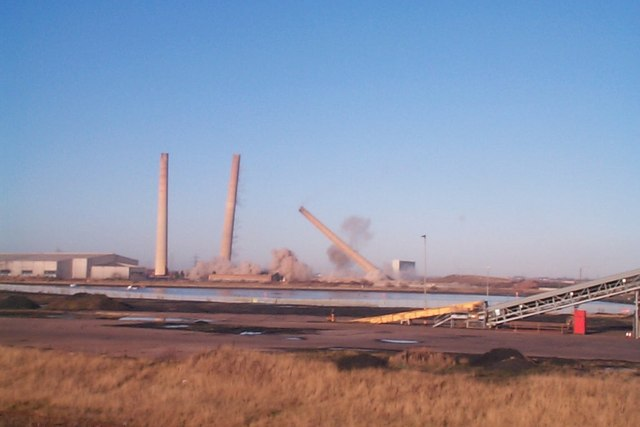
The demolition of the station's chimneys

The demolition contract for the station was won by London-based company Brown & Mason. Before the demolition of the stations' main structures, it was required that they be decommissioned. This involved the removal of hazardous materials and contaminants, to keep in line with Health & Safety at Work regulations. Oils and chemicals were removed for re-use or disposal and storage tanks were flushed out. Methanol was removed from hydrogen production plants on site, along with bottled propane used for welding. The remaining coal in the coal storage area was dispatched to operating power stations in other parts of the country. The landfill site where ash waste from the station was dumped was topsoiled. A programme to remove Asbestos used in the stations commenced decades prior to the demolition of the stations' structures.

The stations were demolished between 2001 and 2003. The smaller buildings and structures were first to be demolished. One worker was killed during the demolition work, in May 2001, crushed underneath an electrical connection box which fell from a wall. On 31 October 2001, the ash silo which stood at the ash dock was toppled using explosives to demolish the stilts the structure stood on. The silo was then dismantled by bulldozers. All of the smaller structures had been removed by July 2002. On 11 July 2002, the A Station's boiler house was demolished. The 61-metre (200 ft) high coal conveyor belt was demolished on 6 February 2003. The station's precipitators were demolished on 27 March and 17 April 2003. On 1 May 2003, the B Station's bunker bay building was demolished, and on 22 May 2003, the station's air heater was demolished. A fire started at the station on 17 June 2003, when a bunker caught fire after hot cutting equipment set fire to coke remnants. All of the larger structures had been demolished by July 2003. It was planned for the stations' chimneys to be demolished in October 2003, but that had to be postponed due to the complexity of the demolition. However, at noon on 7 December 2003, the four chimneys, each weighing 17,000 tonnes (16,730 long tons; 18,740 short tons), were demolished using a total of 150 kilograms (330 lb) of the industrial explosive Gelemex. The demolition is thought to have been the biggest chimney demolition in 50 years.

== Present and future uses of the site ==
Since Innogy plc was taken over by RWE in 2002, the site has been owned by RWE Npower. The only substantial structures remaining are the National Grid and NEDL substations. These buildings will continue to remain and there are plans to extend the National Grid substation. The rest of the power station site is unused brownfield land. The site of the main station buildings is currently covered in crushed concrete, left over from the demolition process. Underground workings, such as tunnels and culverts, also still exist on the site. The coal storage area to the north has been tarmaced and ash settling ponds have been filled with concrete. Some ash mounds are still situated to the east of the site.

=== Clean coal power station ===
In May 2007, Npower announced plans to build a new £2 billion clean coal power station on the site. The proposed station would have generated electricity using three 800 MW advanced supercritical steam, high-efficiency coal-fired units, giving the station a total generation capacity of 2,400 MW. This was one of two new coal-fired stations proposed by Npower in the UK. The site was chosen because of its readily available proximity to the national grid, its rail and port links, and its position next to the North Sea, which is useful for both cooling water, and as a potential CO_{2} storage site, where CO_{2} could be piped to oil and gas wells, and saline aquifers.

The proposed 2,400 MW clean coal power station

The station would have had an efficiency of 46%, which in comparison to conventional subcritical coal-fired power stations, equates to a reduction in carbon dioxide (CO_{2}) of 23% per unit of electricity generated. The station would have utilised pollution abatement and gas cleaning systems, including selective catalytic reduction, to remove nitrogen oxide, and Flue-gas desulphurisation, to remove sulphur dioxide. The station would also have been able to allow the installation of Carbon Capture and Storage (CCS) technology, if it becomes technically and commercially viable. There was also a possibility that the station may have co-fired biomass, and cogenerated heat as a combined heat and power plant.

Coal was expected to be able to be delivered to the station by rail, as well as by ship to the Port of Blyth. The station's coal storage area would have stored a minimum 45 days worth of coal supply. All of the station's pulverised fuel ash (PFA) may have been sold to the construction industry, transported to which in dry dust tankers. Unsold PFA and furnace bottom ash would be taken to a landfill site by road.

Fifteen hundred jobs would have been created during the station's construction, and more than 200 full-time jobs would have been available once the station was operating.

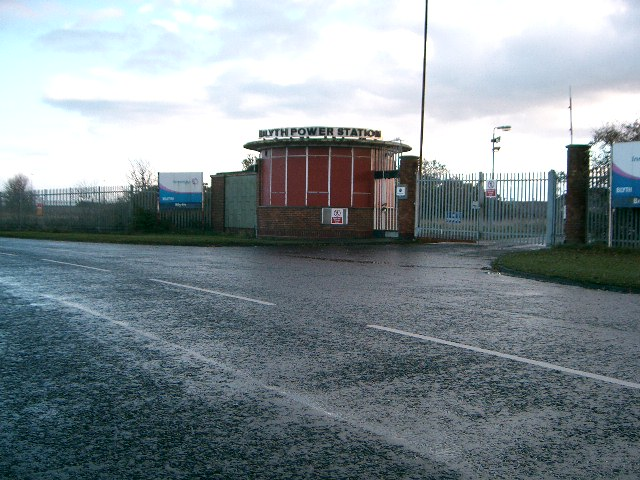
The gate house at the entrance to the now leveled site. This building is now used as a drop-in centre.

The Environmental Assessment Scoping Report for the proposed station was submitted to the Department of Trade and Industry in 2007, and the application for the development was to be made to the Secretary of State for Business, Enterprise and Regulatory Reform once the Environmental Impact Assessment was completed. A contract had already been signed with the Shaw Group to design and engineer the station. If Npower had been granted permission to build the new station, construction work would have begun in 2010, and the station was expected to be fully commissioned by 2014. It would have been one of the most efficient coal-fired power stations of its size in the UK.

Blyth Valley Council said the proposal did not fit with regeneration plans in the area. Residents living in the area voiced opinions that the land should be redeveloped for other purposes, rather than continue to be used as an industrial site. The MP for Wansbeck, Denis Murphy, stated that, although the project would have benefits for the area, he still had concerns. Ronnie Campbell, the MP for Blyth Valley, claimed he would welcome the development as long as it did not have an adverse effect on the overall regeneration of the area. On 5 June 2008, Npower reopened the original gatehouse at the entrance to the power station's site, to provide a "drop-in" centre for the public to find out more about the proposed plans.

In August 2009, following a visit to Cambois from Minister of State for Energy at the Department of Energy and Climate Change Joan Ruddock, it was revealed that the government were determined to go ahead with four new coal-fired power stations. She stated that they had no scepticism about CCS technology, with a competition having been started between the big energy companies to create a viable form of the technology, set to end in 2014. However, this meant the station may not have been completed until 2020.

Despite this support, RWE announced in November 2009 that they have postponed their plans for the new power station. They are not yet going make a formal planning application for the plant, saying that the time is not right for such a huge investment. Dave Carlton, RWE's project manager, has said that they "see the site as an important one, both for RWE npower and in terms of the UK’s future power generation”, and so RWE npower have retained the site for a possible future power station. Malcolm Reid of People Against New Coal Stations, a group opposed to the power station development, said:

"We would now like to see Northumberland County Council re-designate the Cambois site for green, clean technology, to match what is happening at the New and Renewable Energy Centre (NaREC) in Blyth. It is a perfect area for a factory for offshore wind turbines and housing development. If Cambois is re-designated then the prospect of the area being regenerated rises colossally."

=== Wind turbine factory ===
In April 2010, Malcolm Reid proposed the station's site as a possible location for an £80 million Siemens wind turbine factory. The factory would create 700 jobs and up to 1,500 further jobs in the supply chain if built. He has said the site would be perfect for the factory because of its close proximity to NaREC and the site's existing deep dock facilities. The factory is likely to be built either in Blyth or on Humberside.

=== Britishvolt ===
In December 2020, Blyth was confirmed as the location for a new lithium-ion automotive battery manufacturing plant. In July 2021, plans for the £2.6bn gigafactory employing 3,000 people were approved, with the new Britishvolt plant to be located on former coalyards adjacent to the former power station in Cambois. Britishvolt appointed ISG as its construction partner who began work on clearing the site in late 2021. In January 2022, the UK government, through its Automotive Transformation Fund, invested £100m in the Britishvolt project, alongside asset management company abrdn and its property investment arm Tritax, supporting what was planned to be Britain's fourth largest building. However, construction work was halted in August 2022 amid funding concerns. On 17 January 2023, Britishvolt went into administration, and its factory site was put up for sale.

=== QTS data centre ===
In December 2025, Northumberland County Council approved development of a 10 Billion pound, development to build one of the largest data centres in Europe. Led by BTS and Blackstone, the approved plans cover 133 hectares across the former power plant site and set to include two "freedom parks", roads, pedestrian and cycle paths as well as a security gatehouse on top of two identical halls with 10 buildings total.

Each data hall will stand around 110 ft tall and requires 8 separate electricity lines, requiring 55 diesel powered generators to act as a backup as well as cooling systems.

Nicknamed Project Wind, works began October 2025 to clear the site, included removing contaminated red shale waste and the first phase of 4 buildings are projected to be complete by 2030.

== Social and cultural impact ==
The power stations had very few television and film appearances:

- In 1991, the site was used as a shooting location for the sci-fi horror film Alien 3. Various locations in the North East of England were used in shooting the film, and the power station provided the location for some shots of the planet surface.
- During the latter stages of the stations' demolition, a documentary was made. The documentary was included in the Channel Five television programme The Demolition Squad.

Despite the small amount of media usage of the power stations, their four chimneys were still a strong landmark within the south east Northumberland landscape. They could be seen from as far south as 18 kilometres (11 mi) away at Callerton, in Newcastle upon Tyne, and over an 13.2 kilometres (8.2 mi) stretch of coast, from Seaton Sluice up to Newbiggin-by-the-Sea. This is mostly because the stations were constructed in a largely flat, rural area.

In 1995, the site was considered for scheduling by English Heritage, because of its national importance as a good example of a late 20th-century power station. It was also important because of its use as a testing ground for various generating sizes, from which came success in the UK's electricity industry. However, by then the station's buildings were in poor condition and it would have been financially difficult to ensure their long term preservation. Instead, it was decided a comprehensive study and photographic record of the station would be commissioned.

Due to the closure of Blyth Power Stations, along with the power stations at Dunston and Stella in the 1980s and 1990s respectively, the northern part of North East England has become heavily dependent upon the National Grid for electrical supply. However, there are still two power stations at Hartlepool and Wilton in the south of the region. The nearby Blyth Harbour Wind Farm was built in 1993, and the Blyth Offshore Wind Farm started in 2000, beginning the UK offshore wind capacity.

== See also ==
- Electricity Act 1947
- Electricity Act 1957
- Energy use and conservation in the United Kingdom
- List of power stations in England
- Northern Electric
- Timeline of the UK electricity supply industry

Preceded by Drakelow Power Station	Largest Power Station in the UK; 1966	Succeeded by Ferrybridge C Power Station
