= Horton, Blyth =

Former civil parish in Northumberland, England

Coordinates: 55.107°N 1.568°W

Horton
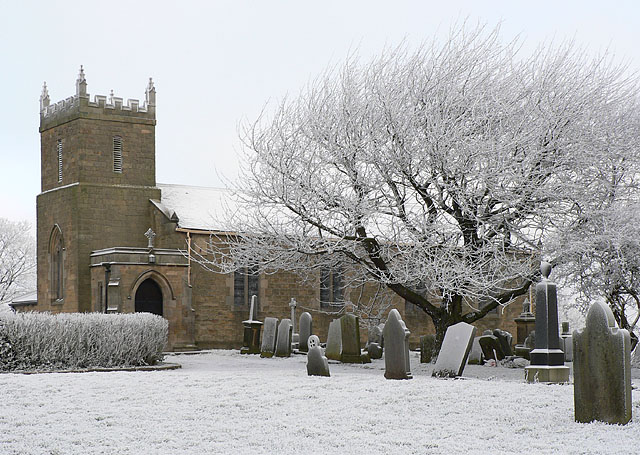
- Horton parish church

- Location within Northumberland
- OS grid reference: NZ285815
- Civil parish: Blyth
- Unitary authority: Northumberland
- Ceremonial county: Northumberland
- Region: North East
- Country: England
- Sovereign state: United Kingdom
- Post town: BLYTH
- Postcode district: NE24
- Police: Northumbria
- Fire: Northumberland
- Ambulance: North East
- UK Parliament: Blyth and Ashington

Horton is a former civil parish, now in the parish of Blyth, in Northumberland, England, about 2 miles (3 km) west of Blyth, and south of the River Blyth. Historically a chapelry of Woodhorn, it became part of Blyth Urban District in 1912, and on 1 April 1920 it was abolished, when it was combined with Bebside, Cowpen, and Newsham and South Blyth to form a single parish for the district. In 1911 the parish had a population of 2546.

Besides for the church, Horton survives in the name of two farms, as well as for the B1505 Horton Road (Ordnance Survey NZ2779/2780).

The place-name Horton is a common one in England. It derives from Old English horu ("dirt") and tūn ("settlement, farm, estate"), presumably meaning "farm on muddy soil".

== Religious sites ==
The church is dedicated to St Mary the Virgin.
