= Blyth Offshore Wind Farm =

Former offshore wind farm in the North Sea

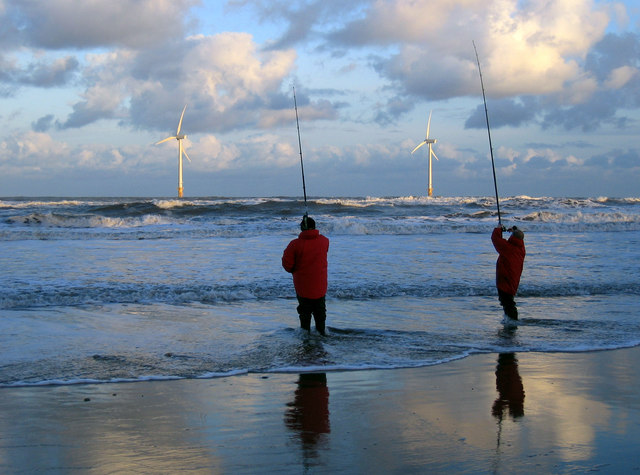
- Blyth Offshore Wind Turbines in January 2004
- Country: England, United Kingdom
- Location: Blyth, Northumberland
- Coordinates: 55°08′09″N 01°29′25″W
- Status: Decommissioned & Removed
- Commission date: December 2000
- Decommission date: March 2019
- Construction cost: €4.6 million
- Owners: E.ON; Shell Renewables; NUON; Border Wind
- Operators: E.ON; EDF Energy

Wind farm
- Type: Offshore
- Max. water depth: 6–11 m (20–36 ft)
- Distance from shore: 1.6 km (1.0 mi)
- Hub height: 62 m (203 ft)
- Rotor diameter: 66 m (217 ft)
- Rated wind speed: 17 m/s (38 mph)

Power generation
- Units operational: 2 x 2 MW
- Make and model: Vestas: V66-2.0 MW
- Nameplate capacity: 4 MW

External links
- Commons: Related media on Commons

Blyth Offshore Wind Farm was a small coastal wind farm located 0.5 miles (0.80 km) off the coast of Blyth, Northumberland, England, and was the first offshore wind farm in the UK.

== History ==
Commissioned in December 2000 as a pilot project, the project was developed by a consortium that included E.ON, Shell Renewables, NUON and Border Wind. E.ON were in charge of operating the farm.

The project was the UK's first offshore wind farm, following the Vindeby in 1991 and Tunø in 1995, as well as being the largest offshore turbines erected in the world at the time. It helped pave the way for more than 2700 bigger offshore turbines installed in British waters since then.

In 2012 there were plans to add a 100 MW test facility of 15 turbines at Blyth and nearby Newbiggin-by-the-Sea, supported by a government grant. The site would be administered by The National Renewable Energy Centre (Narec), based in Blyth. The test facility received planning consent in November 2013. It was planned with the Vestas V164-8MW and 66 kV cables.

The wind farm was decommissioned (as required by authorities) in 2019. One turbine went for spare parts, while the other was re-erected as a training facility in Blyth harbour.

The turbines have been decommissioned and replaced with five turbines further off shore. In 2021, Tenaga Nasional from Malaysia became part owner.

== Design and specification ==
The farm consisted of two Vestas V66 2 MW turbines.

The foundations consisted of 3m diameter monopiles. Due to the nature of the rock reef on which the farm was sited the process was to drill a 3.25m diameter socket into the bedrock. The piles were then positioned centrally in the socket and grout was pumped into the annulus to complete the foundation.
