= Cowpens =

Cowpens may refer to:

- Battle of Cowpens, a battle in the American Revolution
- Cowpens National Battlefield, a unit of the National Park Service that protects the battlefield.
- Cowpens, South Carolina
- USS Cowpens (CG-63), a guided-missile cruiser, commissioned 1991
- USS Cowpens (CVL-25), an aircraft carrier, commissioned 1943

== See also ==
- Cowpen
