= Bebside =

Village in Northumberland, England

Coordinates: 55.12356°N 1.57973°W

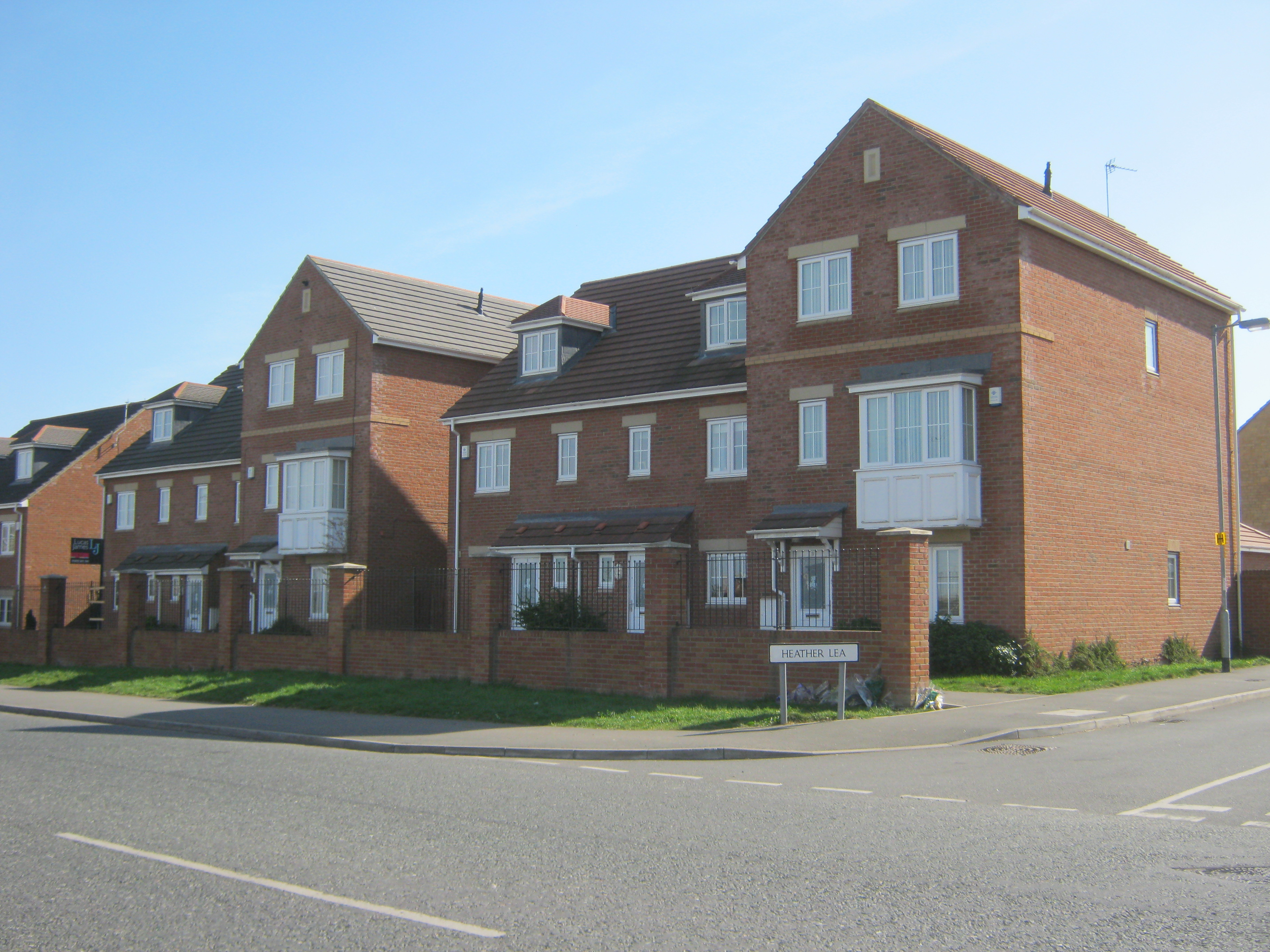
- Heather Lea

- Location within Northumberland
- OS grid reference: NZ269811
- Civil parish: Blyth
- Unitary authority: Northumberland
- Shire county: Northumberland
- Region: North East
- Country: England
- Sovereign state: United Kingdom
- Post town: BLYTH
- Postcode district: NE24
- UK Parliament: Blyth and Ashington

Bebside is a village and former civil parish, now in the parish of Blyth, in Northumberland, England. It is situated to the west of Blyth. It was formerly a mining village, the mine associated with the village operated between 1858 and 1926. It was served by Bebside railway station, from 1850 to 1964, and by Blyth Bebside railway station since 2025. In 1911 the parish had a population of 58.

== Governance ==
Bebside was formerly a township in Horton parish, from 1866 Bebside was a civil parish in its own right until it was abolished on 1 April 1920 to form Blyth.
