= Blyth railway station =

Former railway station in Northumberland, England

Blyth
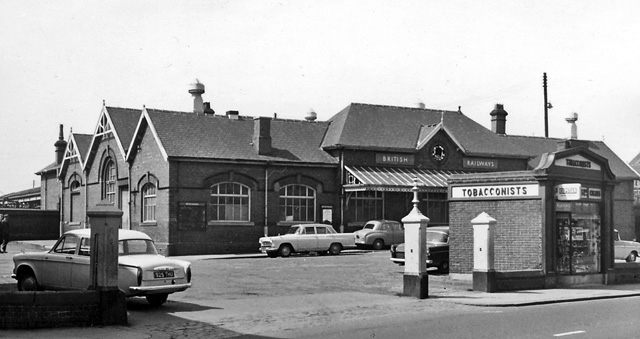
- View from street in 1965

General information
- Location: Blyth, Northumberland, England
- Platforms: 2

Other information
- Status: Disused

History
- Pre-grouping: North Eastern Railway
- Post-grouping: London and North Eastern Railway, British Railways

Key dates
- 3 March 1847: First station opened
- 1 May 1867: Second station opened; first station closed
- 1894–96: Rebuilt
- 2 November 1964: Closed
- 1972: Demolished
- 19 October 2025: Reopened station at Blyth Bebside
Location

Blyth railway station served the town of Blyth, in Northumberland, England. It was a stop on a branch of the Blyth and Tyne Railway between 1847 and 1964. In October 2025, the new Blyth Bebside station was opened, at a different site, on the Northumberland Line.

== History ==
The Blyth, Seghill and Percy Main Railway opened the line to Blyth on 3 March 1847 and the first station was at Croft Street (now King Street). On 1 May 1867, a new station was opened to replace the original. It was at the north end of Turner Street (now part of Regent Street) on the site now occupied by a Morrisons supermarket and the Community Hospital.

The Blyth, Seghill and Percy Main Railway became the Blyth and Tyne Railway in 1853 and was taken over by the North Eastern Railway (NER) in 1874. By the 1890s, the increase in goods and passenger traffic was such that a new station was needed. The NER originally planned to build a new station on newly reclaimed land on Bridge Street, between Union Street and Beaconsfield Street, but these were turned down after an objection from the neighbouring Thomas Knight Memorial Hospital, on the grounds of noise.

The NER therefore rebuilt the existing station between 1894 and 1896, at a cost of £20,000. Most of the building was designed and built by J & W Simpson of Blyth. Despite being next to a through line, the station was a terminus. It faced Turner Street and had a single island platform projecting from the rear which was half covered by a glazed apex canopy. Adjacent were a goods shed, next to Delaval Terrace, and a coaling stage. To the west stood South Blyth locomotive shed, first built in 1879 with three roads and extended to six in 1895, and a cattle dock. To the north passed the freight-only lines to the NER coaling staiths, gas works, Blyth Harbour Commission and shipyard.

The station originally had two signal boxes: Blyth Signal Box, at the end of the passenger platforms, and Blyth Crossing Box controlling the level crossing near the engine shed on Renwick Road (previously Alexandra Crescent). Blyth Signal Box was destroyed by a German parachute mine on the night of 25 April 1941, killing the signaller instantly. Thereafter, only Blyth Crossing Box was used.

Passenger services were withdrawn on 2 November 1964 under The Reshaping of British Railways; the station buildings stood derelict until they were demolished in 1972.

Preceding station	Historical railways	Following station
Newsham; Line closed; station open	Blyth and Tyne Railway	Terminus

== The site today ==
Nothing remains of the station itself or associated buildings, except for the station master's house in Delaval Terrace, which survives as a private home. The site is now a Morrisons supermarket.

== Blyth Bebside station ==
Proposals to reintroduce passenger rail services to the freight-only section of the former Blyth and Tyne Railway system had been discussed since the 1990s.

By the 1990s, local councils were considering the feasibility of restoring passenger services linking Ashington and Blyth with Newcastle Central. These early and informal proposals did not suggest simply rebuilding the branch to Blyth, but by reopening Newsham station where the Blyth branch joined the now freight-only Blyth and Tyne main line.

Following planning approval, the new station, Blyth Bebside, was constructed by the project's primary construction contractor, Morgan Sindall. The new station was not ready in time for the Northumberland Line's opening in December 2024; it was finally opened on 19 October 2025.
