= Wallaw Cinema, Blyth =

Former cinema in Blyth, England

Wallaw Cinema
- The Wallaw
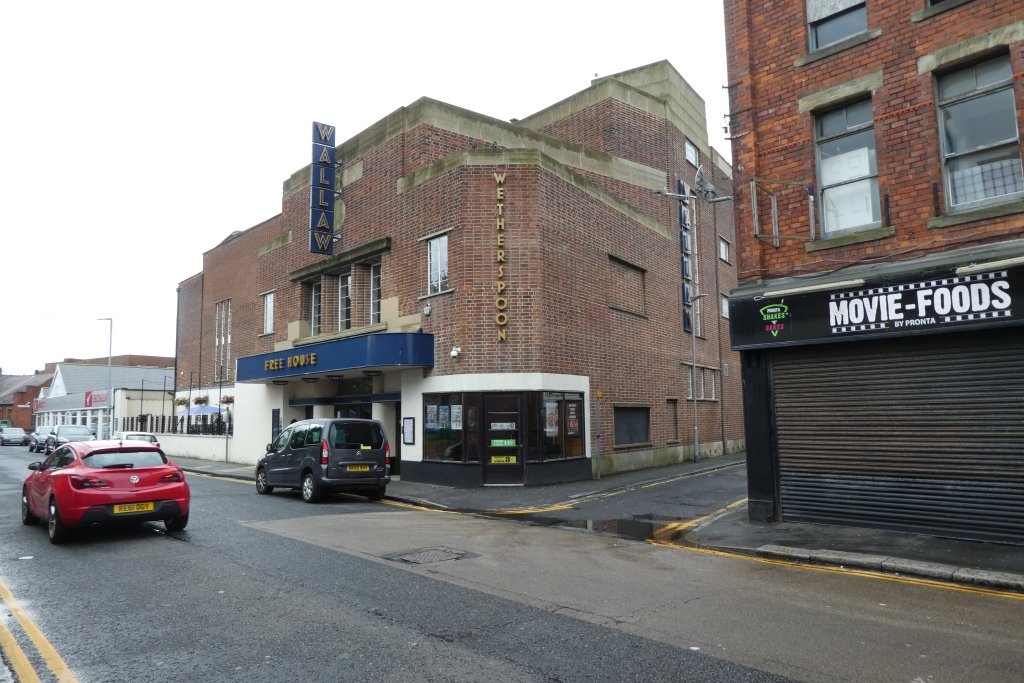
- Interactive map of the Wallaw Cinema area

General information
- Architectural style: Moderne
- Location: Blyth, Northumberland, 14 Union Street; Blyth NE24 2DX, England
- Coordinates: 55°7′35.242″N 1°30′29.160″W grid reference NZ 31466 81452
- Opened: 1937

Design and construction
- Architects: Percy Lindsay Browne, Son and Harding

Website
- www.jdwetherspoon.com/pubs/the-wallaw-blyth/

The Wallaw Cinema is a former cinema, now a Wetherspoons pub The Wallaw, in Blyth, Northumberland, England. it is a Grade II listed building: the listing text remarks that it is "a rare and good example of a 1930s streamlined Moderne style cinema".

== History and description ==
The architects were Percy Lindsay Browne, Son and Harding, of Newcastle upon Tyne, who designed many cinemas in the north east of England; it is thought this cinema was designed by Charles Alfred Harding. It was built for Wallaw Pictures Ltd of Ashington, which had a chain of cinemas in the area. It opened on 16 November 1937.

It was built in Moderne style; the exterior is of brick with cement or artificial stone dressings. It had 1,600 seats, and was both a cinema and theatre.

It was taken over in 1955 by ABC Cinemas. From 1970 it was operated by a succession of independent companies. In 1987 it was converted to have three screens, with two small cinemas under the balcony, leaving the main part of the cinema seating 500 in the circle and 300 in the stalls. The original fittings were retained, including covered lighting and decorative plasterwork, the proscenium having flanking Moderne-style pilasters.

In 1998 it was refurbished, and in that year was given listed building status, Grade II. It closed in 2003, and after remaining unused for a number of years it was purchased by the pub chain Wetherspoons; it was renovated, and opened in December 2013 as "The Wallaw".

The pub now hosts a weekly charity pub quiz on Wednesdays, and provides a space for multiple local classes and groups.
