= Headway Arts =

Headway Arts, incorporated in 1995 as Headstrong Productions, is an English independent arts organisation and registered charity based in Blyth, Northumberland, working from The Old Church, Blyth, a heritage building saved and converted by the company.

It focuses on participatory arts, providing opportunities for people to gain access to the arts and contribute to the cultural life of their community. It aims to engage people who are socially excluded, with a focus on working with disadvantaged groups and adults with learning disability. Its programmes include:

- Creative Cafes - initiative for creative well-being including weekly and monthly workshops such as sound healing, women's circles, creative arts relaxation, stitch and mend.
- Come on Down - an annual festival to celebrate work created by learning-disabled people. Hosted and programmed by Headway Arts Heads Up! vision board of learning disabled and neurodivergent creatives. Local, national and international delegates convene in Blyth.
- The Stars - a programme of weekly workshops for learning disabled and neurodivergent creatives supported by Arts Council England.
- Collaborations for Exchange: Partnership projects developed with Northumbrian's designed to highlight their stories, culture and capture and document hidden histories such as working class communities and those less represented.
- Something a little bit different... an eclectic programme of music nights, celebrations and small scale touring theatre events in the Old Church.

Headway Arts raises funds from grant applications, donations and through sales of professional creative and arts-based training workshops.

== International work ==
Headway Arts is also engaged in international collaborative work with support from the European Union, and since 2009 has attracted Grundtvig funding for partnership work linking with community and arts initiatives in Belgium, Ireland, Italy, Lithuania, Malta, Portugal, Slovenia, Spain and Sweden.

== Awards ==
- Most Exciting Project at North East VCS Awards 2009
- Leading Visionary of the Future in Europe in European Year of Creativity & Innovation 2009
- NIACE Outstanding Achievement Award 2010
- Best Animated Film (Rosemary's Birthday) and Best Fantasy Film (Robots in Space) at 2010 D'Oscar Awards
