= Wilton power stations =

Series of coal, oil, gas and biomass fired CHP power stations

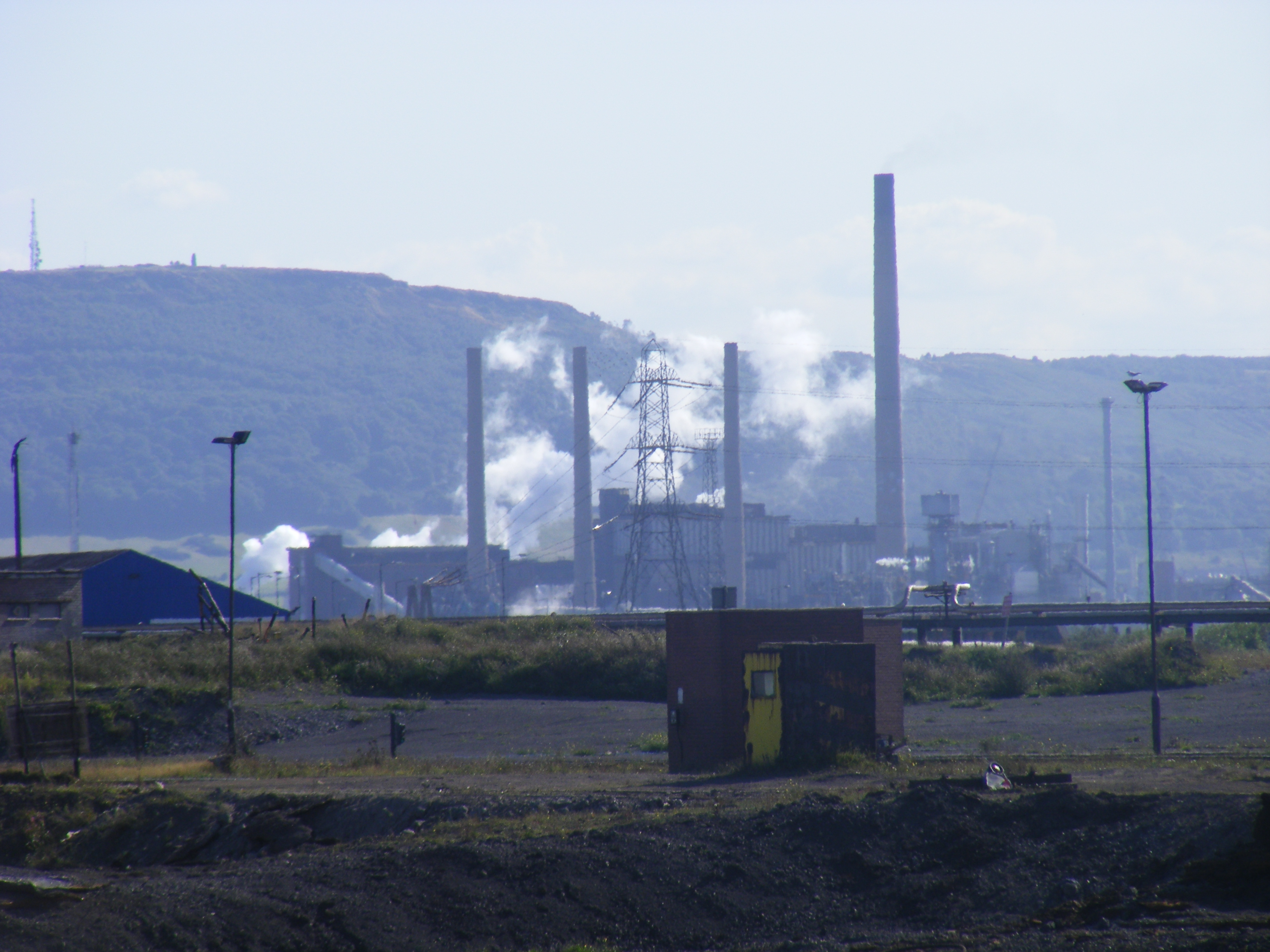
- Wilton power station viewed from Lackenby
- Country: England
- Location: Middlesbrough
- Coordinates: 54.5894°N 1.1185°W
- Status: Peak operational
- Commission date: 1953; Wilton 10: 2007
- Operators: Imperial Chemical Industries (1952-1998); Enron (1998-2002); SembCorp Utilities (2002-present)

Thermal power station
- Primary fuel: Coal
- Secondary fuel: Oil and Gas
- Tertiary fuel: Biomass

Power generation
- Nameplate capacity: 227 MW

External links
- Website: www.sembutilities.co.uk/utilities/power.html
- Commons: Related media on Commons

The Wilton power station refers to a series of coal, oil, gas and biomass fired CHP power stations which provide electricity and heat for the Wilton International Complex, with excess electricity being sold to the National Grid. It is located on the Wilton site in Redcar and Cleveland, south of the town of Middlesbrough in North East England. The station has provided for the site since opening in 1952, when it was operated by ICI. The station is currently owned and operated by SembCorp Industries.

It comprises a variety of generating sets, with units of different ages and various fuels. The station is currently mainly coal and oil fired, but also has a CCGT unit. Wilton 10 was opened at the station in 2007, the UK's first ever large scale biomass only power station. The power station's total generating capacity across all of its units is 227 megawatts. There are plans to build another plant, Wilton 11, a waste to energy plant.

== History ==
Wilton Power Station has been generating electricity and providing steam to the plants on the Wilton International complex since March 1952. A secondary turbine commissioned at the station in November 1951 is still operating there today. For a long time the station was operated by Imperial Chemical Industries (ICI), but they sold the station to American company Enron in November 1998. In early 2002 Enron went bankrupt, and the station was sold to SembCorp.

The station has been approved as a "Good quality" combined heat and power plant under the CHPQA registration scheme. This means that despite burning fossil fuels like coal and oil, the station is exempt from the Climate Change Levy, a tax which otherwise would have been put on the fuels supplied to the station and the electricity generated by it.

== Specification ==
Wilton Power Station is a 197 megawatt (MW) fossil fuel power station, which is currently in constant operation. Over the years, nine boilers have been in operation at the station. In the 1970s the station had a generating capacity of 300 MW and produced 1,200 tonnes of steam per hour. In this period the station was burning waste from the chemical site, byproducts such as: liquid petroleum gas, tars, waste lubricating oils, emulsion residues, waste from aromatic and olefin plants and hydrogen gas from the nylon plant. There are currently three generating sets in operation at the station, two of which are fired by coal, the other of which is a gas turbine fuelled by natural gas. Each of the two coal-fired generating sets are powered by a high pressure boiler, which are each capable of producing a continuous maximum rate of 280 tonnes per hour of steam, at 1,700 psig. Each boiler is then connected to a 33 MW turbine generator. Intermediate pressure steam is then either diverted and fed to other plants in the complex, or sent to three secondary generating sets. After the secondary generating sets, low pressure steam can then be distributed to plants in the complex. Boiler Number 6, one of the coal boilers, was mothballed in 1997, however in 2001 it was refurbished and restored to operation. In 2002, one of the secondary turbines was replaced by a newer unit. In the same year, an automation project involving the boilers, turbines and ancillary equipment was completed.

== Operations ==
Coal is brought to the power station by rail to the Wilton rail delivery terminal and unloaded at the station using a merry-go-round system. The coal is provided by a small number of opencast mines in Northumberland.

Electricity is generated for the major plants on the Wilton complex at 11 kilovolts (kV) and distributed throughout the complex using one of the largest privately owned distribution systems in the world. This system is connected to the National Grid so that surplus electricity can be distributed using four National Grid owned transformers at 66 kV and 275 kV. On top of this, the station produces around 4,000,000 tonnes of steam per year for the plants on the complex.

In late 2003, plans to install a 40 MW gas turbine at the station were finally fulfilled, after they were put off because of then owner Enron's bankruptcy. The gas turbine installation was completed in 2004, and it replaced an oil-fired boiler at the station, resulting in reduced emissions from the station. However, the station has retained the flexibility to fire oil as a backup to coal and gas.

In October 2003, SembCorp applied to the Environment Agency for permission to burn 110,000 tonnes of cow fat (tallow) from the carcasses of animals slaughtered during the BSE Crisis of 1996. The tallow bought was a large portion of the 200,000 tonne stockpile stored on farms in Merseyside and near London. The tallow was brought to the station by road tanker from Merseyside. At the power station it was stored in a tanker, awaiting burning. Following consultation and a 10,000 tonne trial burn between March and May 2004, permission for the burning of the tallow was granted in August 2004. Following a £55 million boiler overhaul in 2005, the station began co-firing biomass.

== Wilton 10 ==
SembCorp announced plans to build the UK's first wood-only burning power station in March 2005. The Wilton 10 Power Station (so called because it was the tenth boiler constructed at the Wilton Power Station) cost £30 million to construct and was built alongside the other Wilton Power Station units. It began generating electricity in September 2007, but was officially opened on 12 November 2007 by Energy Minister Malcolm Wicks. 400 people were employed in the station's construction and there are 15 permanent jobs at the station. The station burns 300,000 tonnes of a combination of sustainable wood, sawmill waste and otherwise unusable wood offcuts a year to produce 30 megawatts (MW) of electricity, as well as 10 MW of thermal energy in the form of steam, which is piped for use in the rest of the Wilton complex. It operates separately from the fossil fuel power station. 80,000 tonnes of waste wood is supplied to the station each year from neighbouring company UK Wood Recycling.

== Wilton 11 ==
On 9 August 2010, Sembcorp announced they were teaming up with SUEZ UK to build a £200 million waste to energy plant alongside the current plants, known as Wilton 11. The plant would treat up to 400,000 tonnes of waste a year to generate 35 MW of electricity. Between 150 and 200 jobs were created in construction, and around 50 permanent jobs created when the plant was completed. There is a possibility that the plant could be supplied with waste using the site's already existing rail link. The plant began operation in late May 2016 and burns the compacted domestic waste of Merseyside brought by rail from Knowsley, near Liverpool. The plant generates enough power for 63,000 homes.
