= Blyth, Northumberland =

Town in Northumberland, England

Blyth
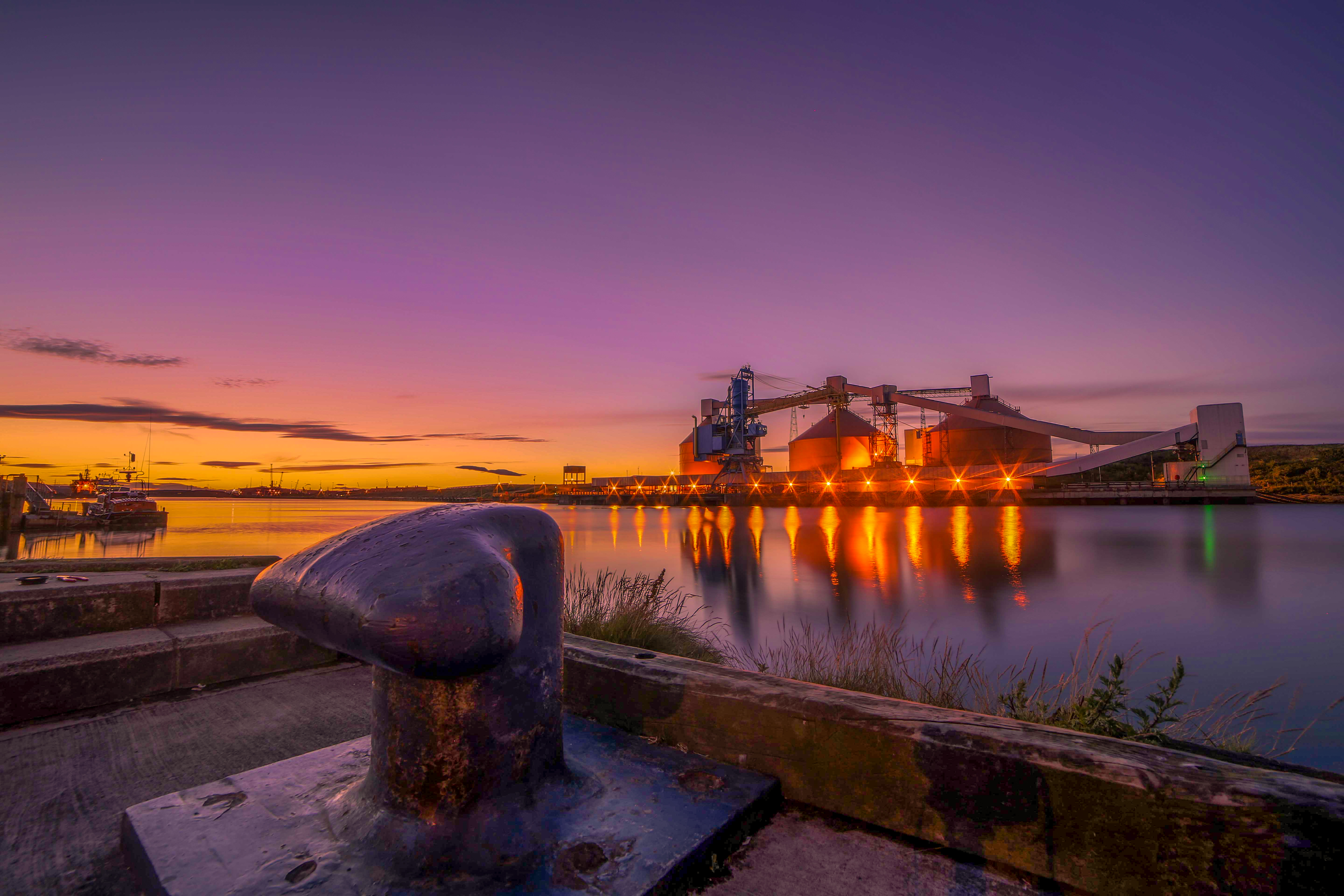
- Blyth Harbour, July 2016

- Location within Northumberland
- Population: 39,731 (2021 census)
- OS grid reference: NZ310814
  - London: 300 miles (480 km) SSE
- Civil parish: Blyth
- Unitary authority: Northumberland
- Ceremonial county: Northumberland
- Region: North East
- Country: England
- Sovereign state: United Kingdom
- Post town: BLYTH
- Postcode district: NE24
- Dialling code: 01670
- Police: Northumbria
- Fire: Northumberland
- Ambulance: North East
- UK Parliament: Blyth and Ashington

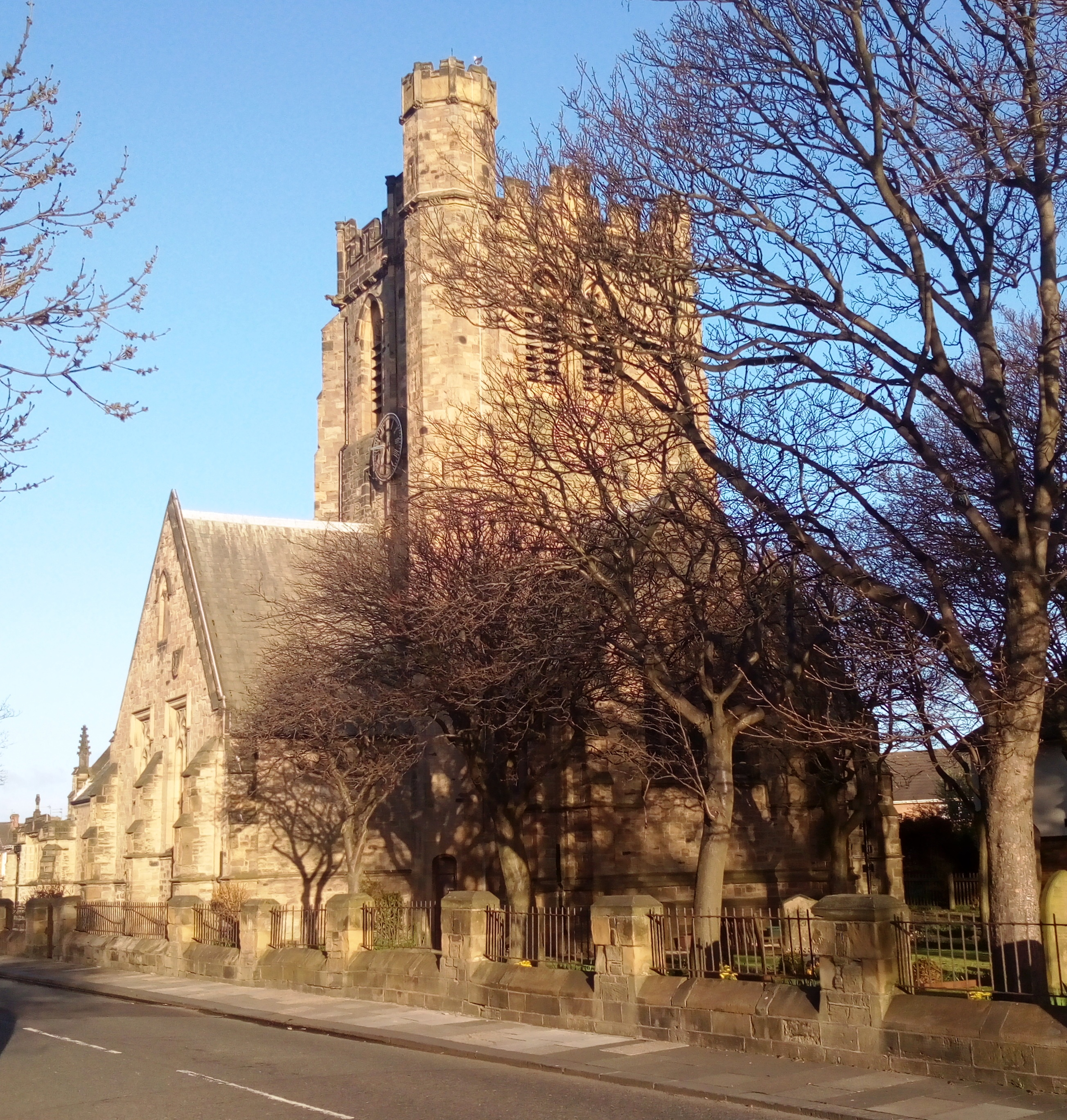
St Cuthbert's Church, the parish church of Blyth and a Grade II* listed building

Blyth (/ˈblaɪð/ BLYDH) is an industrial port town as well as a civil parish in southeast Northumberland, England. It lies on the coast, to the south of the River Blyth. It has a population of 39,731 as of the 2021 census, up 6% from the 2011 census and population of 37,347.

The port of Blyth dates from the 12th century, but the development of the modern town only began in the first quarter of the 18th century. The main industries which helped the town prosper were coal mining and shipbuilding, with the salt trade, fishing, and the railways also playing an important role. These industries have largely vanished, but the port still receives paper and pulp from Scandinavia for the newspaper industries of England and Scotland.

The town was seriously affected when its principal industries went into decline, and it has undergone regeneration since the early 1990s. The Keel Row Shopping Centre, opened in 1991, brought high street retailers to Blyth, and helped to revitalise the town centre; it closed in 2024 as part of the country council's Energising Blyth initiative. The market place has recently been re-developed, with the aim of attracting further investment to the town.

The quayside has been redeveloped into an open space, the centrepiece of which is a sculpture commemorating local industry. On the opposite side of the river are the nine wind turbines of the Blyth Harbour Wind Farm, which were constructed along the East Pier in 1992. They were joined in 2000 by Blyth Offshore Wind Farm, which consisted of two turbines situated 1 kilometre (0.62 mi) out to sea. These were the first two offshore wind turbines in the UK. These wind turbines were all decommissioned, with the final two being removed in 2019. A new windfarm further off the coast, composed of five turbines, was commissioned in 2017.

Blyth is also the home of the non-League football club Blyth Spartans, known for their 1978 "giant-killing" feats in the FA Cup.

== History ==
=== Toponymy ===
The place-name Blyth is first attested in 1130 as Blida, and takes its name from the river Blyth. The river's name comes from the Old English adjective blīðe meaning 'gentle' or 'merry'. The town of Blyth is referred to as Blithmuth in 1236 and Blithemuth in 1250. Had this name persisted, the town would today be referred to as "Blythmouth", on the analogy of Tynemouth to the south.

=== Early history (pre-12th century) ===
Little is known of the early development of the Blyth area. The oldest archaeological find is an antler hammer dating from the late Neolithic or early Bronze Age period, which was found at Newsham in 1979. Human skulls, a spearhead and a sword dating from the Bronze Age were found in the river in 1890, as well as a bronze axe which was found at South Beach in 1993, and a dagger found at Newsham. Although there is no conclusive evidence of a Roman presence in the area, an earthwork shown on early mapping of the area, at the location of present-day Freehold Street, is said to have been a Roman camp, but it has also been argued that it may be of Norsemen origin or date from the Civil War. Debate also surrounds a mosaic which was found near Bath Terrace. The strongest evidence so far has been a single coin, dating from the reign of the Emperor Constans (AD337–350), which was found during excavations for a dry dock. Also four Roman coins were found when digging an air raid shelter in a back garden on Chestnut Avenue.

=== 13th-16th centuries ===
Between the 12th and 18th centuries, there were several small settlements and some industrial activity in the area. The principal industries during this period were coal mining, fishing and the salt trade. Shipbuilding in the area dates from 1748.

The area now known as Blyth was first recorded in 1208 as 'Snoc de Blimue' ('snook at the mouth of the River Blyth') in the settlement of a lawsuit. At this point, the areas now distinguished as Blyth and Cowpen were separated by a tidal inlet parallel to the River Blyth, which covered Cowpen Quay, Post Office Square, Beaconsfield Street, running beyond the site of Crofton Mill Pit. The 'town' consisted of an island-like, narrow strip of land consisting of salt pans and a few cottages. Blyth was part of the Manor of Newsham, property of Gilbert De la Val (one of the Barons who forced King John to sign the Magna Carta in 1215.

Until around the 17th century, Blyth-Nook remained mostly neglected while settlements such as Bedlington, Horton, Newsham and Cowpen grew rich from Saxon agriculture despite raids from the Danes.

In 1386, Blyth-Nook was described as, "a place in which fishermen used to dwell, now wasted and unoccupied because of raids."

By 1552, Newsham was primarily a rich farming area, whilst Blyth was a small fishing station with little by way of housing. Little expansion occurred for 300 years, but the importance of the River Blyth has grown significantly. Until the late 18th century, Blyth-Nook remained mostly uninhabited as a smaller hamlet than Newbiggin and Seaton Sluice.

=== 17th century ===
Throughout the 17th century, growth of Blyth's coal industry was seen, due to inward investment into collieries by both local men and investors from the South of England. In 1610, Huntingdon Beaumont of Nottinghamshire introduced wooden Wagonways as a form of coal transport, which was one of the first of that transportation methods to be recorded (Huntingdon had pioneered wooden waggonways for transporting coal in c.1603 in Wollaton, Nottingham). Waggons with one horse were used to carry coals from the pits to the river. From 1692 to 1709, the Plessey Waggonway was constructed from Plessey to Blyth-Nook. Part of the waggonway now forms the route of Plessey Road, where it derives its name. It was constructed of a double-line of beech rails laid on oak sleepers. The waggons had wooden wheels with nails driven into them to reduce wear and tear. Until the first staithes in 1716, the coal was offloaded onto ships by barrow.

=== 18th century ===
The modern town of Blyth began to develop in the first quarter of the 18th century.

Up until 1716, the land around the Blyth area—the Newsham Estate—was owned by the Earls of Derwentwater, but when James Radclyffe, 3rd Earl of Derwentwater, was executed for his part in the Jacobite rising of 1715, the land was forfeited to the Crown.

On 11 July 1723, the Lordship of Newsham was put up for sale by the Commissioners of Forfeited Estates at their office in the Inner Temple, London. The land was bought by Matthew White of Newcastle and Richard Ridley of Blagdon. From the 12th century, most port activities were on the north side of the river, but under White and Ridley the first new quays and houses were built on the south side, and from here the port began to prosper. However, by this point, Blyth still only consisted of a few farms and labourers' cottages.

At this time, the success of the Plessey Waggonway was seen with 58,000 tons of coal being transported that year (1723), rising to 67,000 tons by 1734.

By 1730, a coaling quay, a ballast quay, a pilots' watch house and a lighthouse had all been built at Blyth harbour.

In 1765 the first breakwater was constructed, and in 1788 the first staith with an elevated loading point was erected.

=== 19th century ===
Deep mines were sunk at Cowpen Colliery and Cowpen Square in 1796 and 1804 respectively, and by 1855, a quarter of a million tons of coal was being shipped from Blyth, rising to three million tons by 1900. The only industry not to survive during this prosperous time was the salt trade, which was heavily taxed during the 18th and early-19th centuries. During the Napoleonic Wars, the tax was increased to provide funds for the military and, even though the tax was abolished in 1825, the industry went into terminal decline. Having had fourteen salt pans at the beginning of the 18th century, exporting over 1,000 tons of salt annually, Blyth's salt industry closed in 1876, with the destruction of the last salt pan.

At Easter in 1887, William Morris, the poet and interior designer, met and addressed a considerable crowd of striking miners in the market square in Blyth. He spoke for about 40 minutes and then led them 6 miles (9.7 km) to Horton. They swelled the numbers there to around 6,000–7,000 where Morris spoke again. They had been forced to take a 12.5% pay cut but according to The Newcastle Chronicle Morris said:

"But let them remember that they were many and the Masters few. Masters could only attack with a certain instrument and what was that instrument? A part of the working classes themselves" – by which he meant the police.

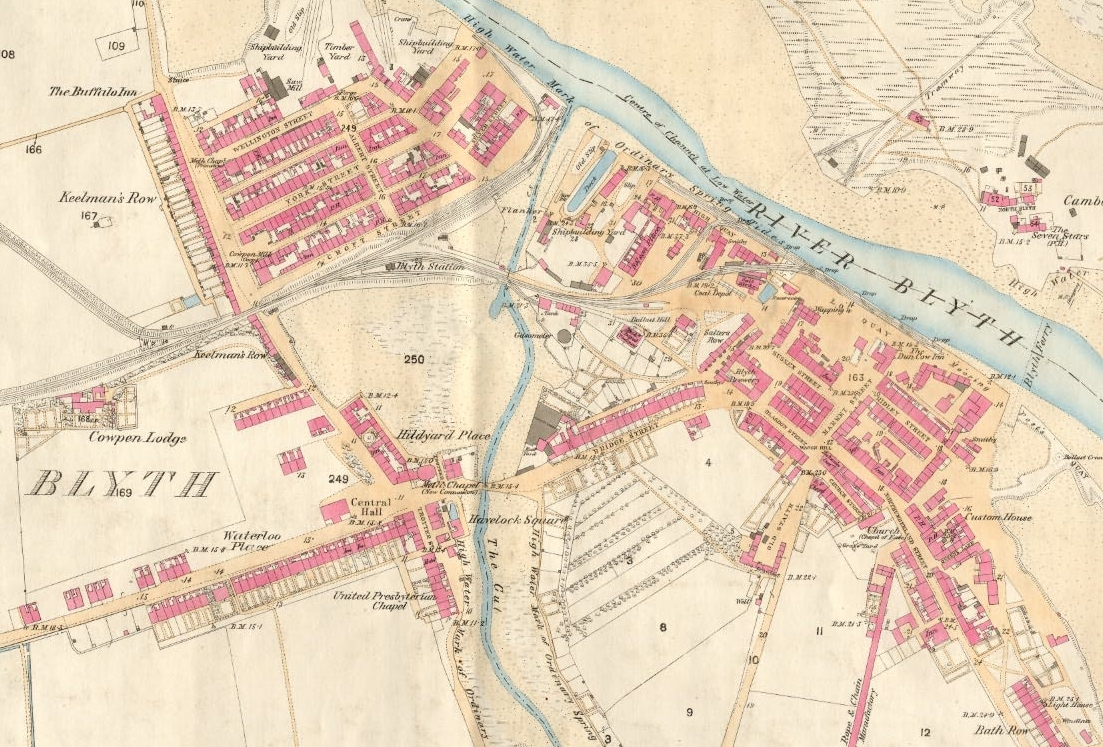
A map of Blyth, circa 1860: the old part of the town is to the right; the houses of Waterloo and Cowpen Quay are to the bottom-left and top-left respectively. Also depicted are "the Gut" (or "Slake") and the first Blyth railway station.

From the mid-19th century, several important events occurred which allowed the port of Blyth to rapidly expand. First, in 1847, a railway line was constructed, connecting Blyth to collieries at Seghill. In 1853, the Blyth Harbour and Docks Board was formed, then the Blyth Harbour and Dock Act 1858 (21 & 22 Vict. c. lxviii) was passed allowing dredging of the harbour to begin. In 1882, the formation of the Blyth Harbour Commission led to the building of new coal loading staiths, as well as the construction of the South Harbour.

As trade in Blyth continued to grow, so did the population. Development of the Cowpen Quay and Waterloo areas began in about 1810 and 1815 respectively, and between the 1850s and 1890s major house building took place in these areas. Blyth railway station, first built in 1847, was relocated in 1867 and rebuilt by local company J&W Simpson Ltd. in 1896, to cope with the increase in goods and passenger traffic. The 1890s saw the filling in of "the Slake" (also known as "the Flanker" or "the Gut"). The Slake was a tidal inlet which stretched south from the river, across the site of today's bus station, along the route of Beaconsfield Street, and on past Crofton Mill Pit. Before it was filled in, it almost entirely separated Blyth from Cowpen—Waterloo Bridge providing the only main link. Once it was removed, the two areas could combine and allow the town to begin to take its present form. The town continued to expand in the 20th century; much large-scale house building took place in the 1920s and 1930s, and from the 1950s to the 1970s.

=== 20th century ===
Industry in Blyth reached its peak in the first half of the 20th century. At this time it boasted one of the largest shipbuilding yards on the North East coast, with five dry docks and four building slipways. During the First and Second World Wars, the Blyth shipyards built many ships for the Royal Navy including the first aircraft carrier, HMS Ark Royal in 1914. Blyth also served as a submarine base during both wars. Blyth was bombed a number of times during World War II. Landmarks such as the railway station (now Morrisons), the Wallaw Cinema (now Wetherspoons), and houses took damage. By 1930, the port of Blyth was exporting 5.5 million tons of coal, and by the early 1960s, reached its peak with over six million tons. Blyth A and Blyth B power stations, collectively known as Blyth Power Station, were opened in 1958 and 1962. Blyth A was the first power station in Britain to have 120 megawatt sets installed, while Blyth B was the first to be fitted with 275 megawatt sets.

During the 1960s, Blyth entered a period of steep decline. Following the Beeching report, the railway into Blyth was closed in 1965; and in 1966, economic depression resulted in the closure of the shipyards. As the demand for coal fell, due to the increasing use of oil, natural gas and nuclear power as energy sources, the following years saw the closure of many collieries in the area. By the 1980s, the only one left in the town was Bates' Pit, which closed in 1986. In January 2002, Blyth Power Station was closed and demolished in stages, and on 7 December 2003, its four chimneys were felled.

== Governance ==
From around the first quarter of the 18th century, until November 1900, the land to the south of the River Blyth was known as South Blyth. It was in the Parish of Earsdon and was run by the parish council until 1863, when the South Blyth Local Board was formed. Under the Local Government Act 1894, South Blyth Local Board became an urban district council, then in 1906 it was amalgamated with Cowpen Urban District Council to form Blyth Urban District Council. On 21 September 1922, Blyth UDC became Blyth Municipal Borough Council, and in 1935 its southern boundary was moved south from Meggie's Burn to Seaton Burn. Blyth MBC lasted until 1974, when it was amalgamated with Seaton Valley and Cramlington urban district councils, as well as a small part of Whitley Bay Borough Council (most of which was transferred to the new county of Tyne and Wear), to form Blyth Valley Borough Council.

Blyth was the administrative centre for the borough of Blyth Valley, until the borough was abolished in structural changes to local government on 1 April 2009. Blyth Valley—which also included Cramlington and several villages—was 70 square kilometres in size and, according to the Registrar General's Population Estimate for mid-2005, it had a population of 81,600; this gives a population density of 1,166 people per square kilometre. The two-tier local government of Northumberland County Council and Blyth Valley Borough Council has been replaced by a unitary authority for the county of Northumberland. Blyth is situated in the parliamentary constituency of Blyth Valley, which shares its boundaries with the borough. It is divided up into twenty wards, nine of which—Cowpen, Croft, Isabella, Kitty Brewster, Newsham and New Delaval, Plessey, South Beach, South Newsham, and Wensleydale—make up the town of Blyth.

Blyth is represented in the House of Commons, as part of the Blyth and Ashington constituency, by Ian Lavery of the Labour Party.

Blyth is twinned with Solingen, Germany. As part of Blyth Valley it was previously also twinned with Ratingen, Germany and Gelendzhik, Russia.

== Geography ==
Blyth is on the coast of North East England, to the south of the River Blyth and is approximately 13 miles (21 km) northeast of Newcastle upon Tyne and 16 miles (26 km) north of Sunderland. It is 7 miles (11 km) east of Bedlington, 6 miles (9.7 km) northeast of Cramlington, 7 miles (11 km) south-southeast of Ashington and 7 miles (11 km) south of Newbiggin-by-the-Sea. On the north side of the river are the villages of East Sleekburn, Cambois and North Blyth and to the south of the town are the villages of New Hartley, Seaton Delaval and Seaton Sluice. Some of Blyth's suburbs have origins which can be traced back much further than the town itself; Newsham, Bebside and Cowpen are all believed to have had habitation sites dating from the Romano-British, Saxon and Medieval periods, although most of the housing in these areas dates from the 19th and 20th centuries. Also occupying the suburbs are several large housing estates; the Newsham Farm, South Beach and Solingen estates, and the Avenues were all developed during the 20th century. In January 2005, the land in Blyth was made up of 61.87% green space, 11.95% domestic gardens, 8.23% road, 4.85% domestic buildings, 2.03% non-domestic buildings, and 11.07% other uses.

The geology of the area is made up of a carboniferous bedrock of sandstone, mudstone, and coal, which is covered mainly by boulder clay and till.

In October 2023 the sand at Blyth promenade beach was washed away by Storm Ciarán.

=== Climate ===
The climate in Northumberland is generally cool and dry. Compared with the rest of the United Kingdom, the weather there is relatively stable, and extreme conditions, such as floods, droughts, or heatwaves, are rare. Below are the average maximum and minimum temperatures, and average rainfall recorded between 1971 and 2000 at the Met Office weather station in Boulmer, which is around 33 kilometres (21 mi) north of Blyth.

Climate data for Boulmer, elevation: 23 m (75 ft), 1991–2020 normals, extremes 1975–present
Month	Jan	Feb	Mar	Apr	May	Jun	Jul	Aug	Sep	Oct	Nov	Dec	Year
Record high °C (°F)	15.2 (59.4)	17.5 (63.5)	21.1 (70.0)	21.0 (69.8)	24.8 (76.6)	27.7 (81.9)	30.5 (86.9)	28.2 (82.8)	25.2 (77.4)	23.4 (74.1)	17.9 (64.2)	16.5 (61.7)	30.5 (86.9)
Mean daily maximum °C (°F)	7.3 (45.1)	7.8 (46.0)	9.3 (48.7)	11.2 (52.2)	13.7 (56.7)	16.4 (61.5)	18.7 (65.7)	18.6 (65.5)	16.5 (61.7)	13.3 (55.9)	9.9 (49.8)	7.6 (45.7)	12.6 (54.7)
Daily mean °C (°F)	4.6 (40.3)	5.0 (41.0)	6.1 (43.0)	7.8 (46.0)	10.3 (50.5)	12.9 (55.2)	15.0 (59.0)	15.0 (59.0)	13.2 (55.8)	10.3 (50.5)	7.1 (44.8)	4.9 (40.8)	9.4 (48.9)
Mean daily minimum °C (°F)	2.0 (35.6)	2.1 (35.8)	2.9 (37.2)	4.5 (40.1)	6.8 (44.2)	9.5 (49.1)	11.4 (52.5)	11.4 (52.5)	9.8 (49.6)	7.4 (45.3)	4.4 (39.9)	2.2 (36.0)	6.2 (43.2)
Record low °C (°F)	−12.3 (9.9)	−9.2 (15.4)	−8.2 (17.2)	−2.8 (27.0)	−1.0 (30.2)	2.6 (36.7)	4.9 (40.8)	3.7 (38.7)	1.6 (34.9)	−2.7 (27.1)	−8.9 (16.0)	−12.1 (10.2)	−12.3 (9.9)
Average precipitation mm (inches)	57.3 (2.26)	47.8 (1.88)	43.7 (1.72)	49.6 (1.95)	42.5 (1.67)	63.7 (2.51)	63.7 (2.51)	67.8 (2.67)	52.9 (2.08)	72.2 (2.84)	81.3 (3.20)	65.2 (2.57)	707.7 (27.86)
Average precipitation days (≥ 1.0 mm)	11.8	10.1	8.8	8.9	8.7	10.1	10.4	10.5	9.3	12.2	12.9	11.5	125.2
Mean monthly sunshine hours	63.7	87.4	128.6	167.7	209.8	192.2	188.4	174.2	140.0	104.6	73.3	58.4	1,588.4
Source 1: Met Office
Source 2: Starlings Roost Weather

The average maximum temperatures between April and October are around 1–2½ °C lower than the national average and the average minimum temperatures between May and August are around ½ °C below the national average; both the average maximum and minimum temperatures for the remainder of the year are about the same as the national average. The average rainfall in Northumberland is well below the national average; 651 millimetres (26 in) was recorded at Boulmer, compared to 838 millimetres (33 in) for the whole of England.

== Transport ==
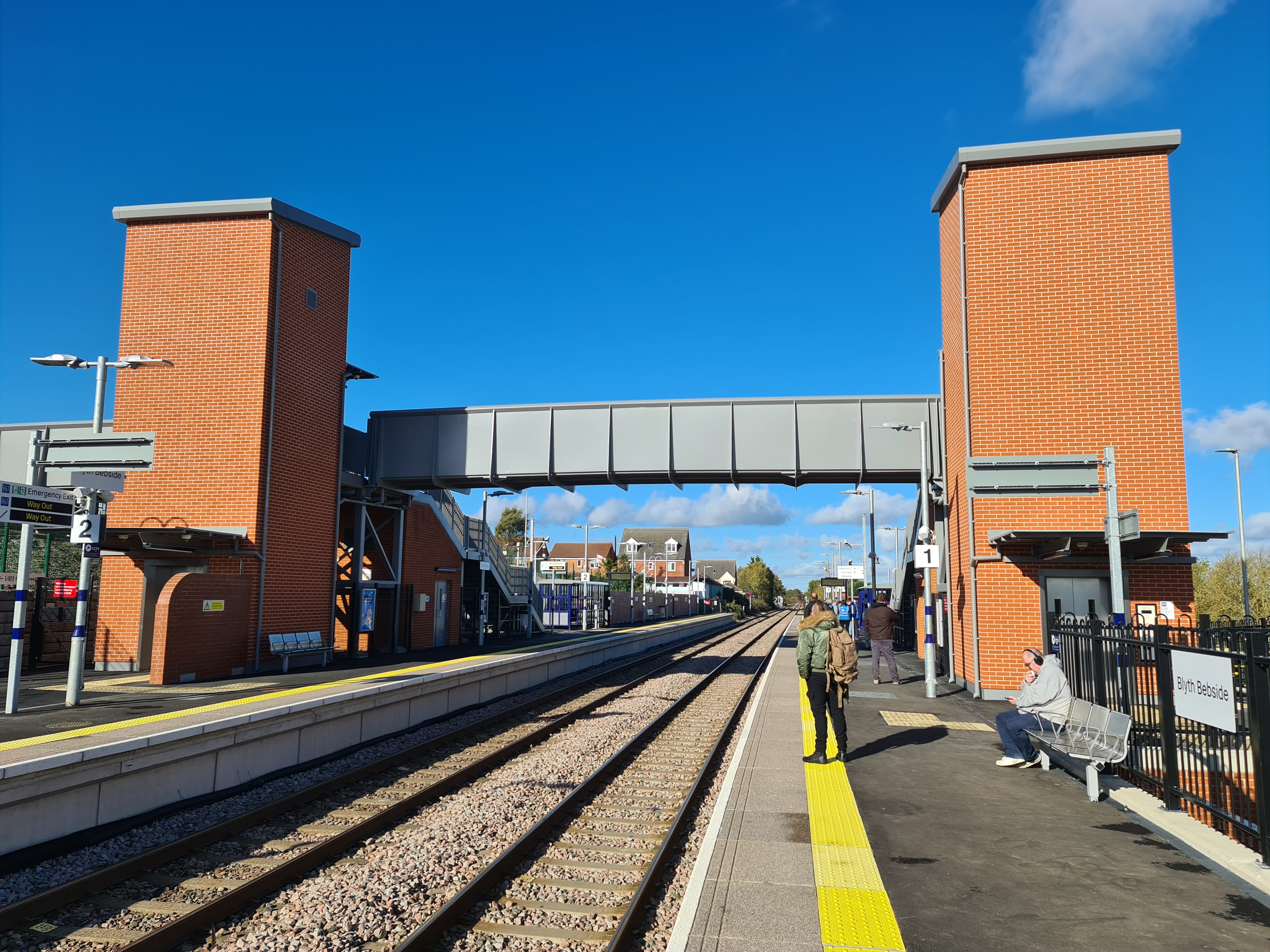
The new railway station at Blyth Bebside

=== Rail ===
The town is served by the Northumberland Line, which provides passenger railway services from Ashington to Seaton Delaval and Newcastle. Until 2025, Blyth had no passenger rail service. It is now served by Blyth Bebside railway station, located on the west side of the town and Newsham railway station, to the south of the town, both on the newly reopened Northumberland Line. The stations are served by two trains per hour to Ashington and two to Newcastle.

=== Bus ===
Blyth bus station is located in Post Office Square in the town centre. Buses in Blyth are operated by Arriva North East and there are regular services to Newcastle as well as the other main towns in the south of Northumberland and the surrounding areas of Blyth. One service is operated by Go North East.

=== Road ===
Blyth is well served by roads. The A189 (colloquially known as the Spine Road) accessible from the A1 via the A19. The A193 is the main road through Blyth and leads to Bedlington to the west and North Tyneside to the south. The other main route into Blyth is the A1061.

=== Air and sea ===
The nearest airport is Newcastle Airport, which provides scheduled domestic flights, flights covering many major cities in Europe, long haul international flights and holiday charter flights. There is a port in Blyth.

== Port of Blyth ==
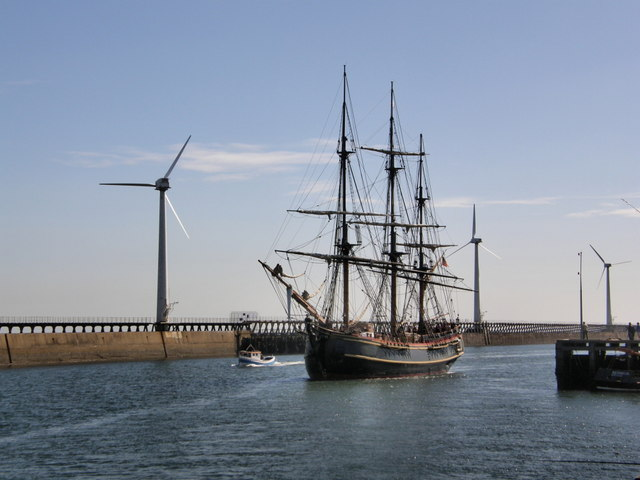
Replica of HMS Bounty, as used in the film Mutiny on the Bounty entering Blyth Harbour, 4 September 2007, with wind turbines from the Blyth Harbour breakwater in the background

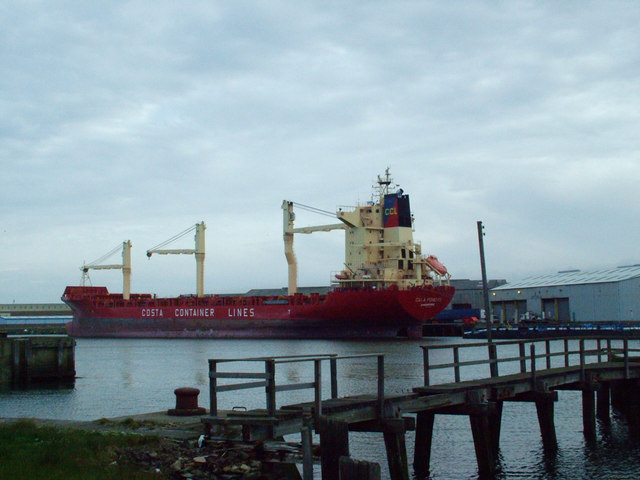
A container ship unloads at the former Battleship Wharf in June 2009, named when it was previously used for scrapping Royal Navy ships post-WW2

=== Early history ===
The Port of Blyth was first recorded from 1138, when monks at Newminster Abbey exported salt, having created it from pans on the north side of the river and evaporated using the copious supplies of local coal. Coal exports started from the 14th century, with local mines recorded from the 16th century. In 1609 21,571 tons of coal were shipped from Blyth. The first large quay – Bishop's Quay, which still exists today – was developed by 1682. But the port was not dredged at this time, necessitating the use of Northumbrian keels (manually propelled lighters) to transfer the loads to ships moored towards the mouth of the river. By 1730 specific coaling and ballast quays existed, and by 1765 the port’s facilities included a pilot house and lighthouse, to facilitate the newly built first breakwater, North Dyke. The High Lighthouse came into operation soon afterwards, operating until July 1984.

=== 18th century ===
The Blyth port was founded by Edmund Hannay after he settled in Blyth in 1750. In 1786, Blyth's growth as a ship building town was seen after compulsory ship registration was brought in by the Shipping Act 1786 (26 Geo. 3. c. 60). After this time, it is noted that 35 ships were built in Blyth paving the way for a much greater expansion in the 19th century as its reputation grew. These 35 ships were built by four shipyards and credited to four main people: M. Watson, R. Stoker, Watts, and Hannay.

There is a clear increase in ships being loaded at Blyth due to the accompanying increase in coal output with over 100 average increases between the years of 1755-1767 and 1793-1799. This figure shows that Blyth's use as a port to pick up coal increased. Other figures show that Blyth made ships were also used to export coal across the country particularly to Lynn and London.

1755-1767: average of ships loaded at Blyth was 165.

1793-1799: average of ships loaded at Blyth was 292

=== 19th century ===
Blyth Harbour and Dock Act 1854
- Act of Parliament
- Parliament of the United Kingdom
- Long title: An Act for improving the Harbour of Blyth in the County of Northumberland, and for constructing Docks there; and for other Purposes.
- Citation: 17 & 18 Vict. c. xcii

Dates
- Royal assent: 3 July 1854
Other legislation
Repealed by	Blyth Harbour and Dock Act 1858

Status: Repealed

Blyth Harbour and Dock Act 1858
- Act of Parliament
- Parliament of the United Kingdom
- Long title: An Act to repeal "The Blyth Harbour and Dock Act, 1854," and to regulate the Company constituted thereby; and for other Purposes.
- Citation: 21 & 22 Vict. c. lxviii

Dates
- Royal assent: 28 June 1858
Other legislation
Repeals/revokes	Blyth Harbour and Dock Act 1854
Amended by	Blyth Harbour and Docks Act 1860

Blyth Harbour and Docks Act 1860
- Act of Parliament
- Parliament of the United Kingdom
- Long title: An Act to amend "The Blyth Harbour and Dock Act, 1858;" to extend the Time for Completion of Works, and to levy additional Tolls and Rates; and for other Purposes.
- Citation: 23 & 24 Vict. c. cvi

Dates
- Royal assent: 3 July 1860
Other legislation
Amends	Blyth Harbour and Docks Act 1858

Blyth Harbour Act 1882
- Act of Parliament
- Parliament of the United Kingdom
- Long title: An Act to constitute and incorporate Commissioners for the management of Blyth Harbour in the county of Northumberland and to vest the harbour undertaking in them and empower them to construct additional works; and for other purposes.
- Citation: 45 & 46 Vict. c. liv

Dates
- Royal assent: 19 June 1882

Text of statute as originally enacted

The port expanded greatly in the 19th century, with the purchase of a steam tug in 1819, and the rebuilding of the breakwater in 1822. By this point, three ship building yards had also been established. The construction of the Blyth and Tyne Railway from 1849 allowed coal shipments to quickly expand, reaching 200,000 tons per annum. The Blyth Harbour and Dock Company was created by the Blyth Harbour and Dock Act 1854 (17 & 18 Vict. c. xcii), but with need for further expansion, it was replaced by the Blyth Harbour Act 1882 (45 & 46 Vict. c. liv) given royal assent on 19 June 1882, which constituted the current Blyth Harbour Commission. This allowed additional financing to be raised, for construction of the South Harbour.

In the early 19th century its clear that Britain was at the frontier of industrial development and Blyth became an integral part of this due to the port. Blyth greatly contributed to the coal exports needed to help Britain be an industrial dominator, with an export of 200,000 tonnes per annum to London and varying other ports across the country. The build up of the different trade elations between Blyth and London gave an insight to the demands of industrialisation as well as the importance of such a small shipping town.

=== 20th century ===
Blyth Harbour Act 1912
- Act of Parliament
- Parliament of the United Kingdom
- Long title: An Act to alter the constitution of and method of election to the Blyth Harbour Commission to confer further powers upon the Commissioners to authorise the Commissioners to construct works and acquire lands to raise additional money and to create stock and for other purposes.
- Citation: 2 & 3 Geo. 5. c. cix

Dates
- Royal assent: 7 August 1912

Text of statute as originally enacted

Blyth Harbour Act 1915
- Act of Parliament
- Parliament of the United Kingdom
- Long title: An Act to empower the Blyth Harbour Commissioners to construct a toll bridge over the River Blyth with approaches thereto to construct new piers or breakwaters and for other purposes.
- Citation: 5 & 6 Geo. 5. c. xiv

Dates
- Royal assent: 9 June 1915

Text of statute as originally enacted

Blyth Harbour Act 1919
- Act of Parliament
- Parliament of the United Kingdom
- Long title: An Act to increase the maximum rates dues tolls and charges leviable by the Blyth Harbour Commissioners.
- Citation: 9 & 10 Geo. 5. c. xi

Dates
- Royal assent: 29 May 1919
Other legislation
Repealed by	Blyth Harbour Act 1986

Status: Repealed

Text of statute as originally enacted

Blyth Harbour Act 1957
- Act of Parliament
- Parliament of the United Kingdom
- Long title: An Act to alter the constitution of the Blyth Harbour Commissioners to increase the maximum rates tolls and charges leviable by the Commissioners to confer upon the Commissioners further powers with respect to the raising of money and for other purposes.
- Citation: 5 & 6 Eliz. 2. c. vi

Dates
- Royal assent: 6 June 1957

Text of statute as originally enacted

Blyth Harbour Act 1986
- Act of Parliament
- Parliament of the United Kingdom
- Long title: An Act to reconstitute the Blyth Harbour Commissioners; to make further and other provision as to their powers and duties; to redefine the harbour limits at Blyth; and for connected or other purposes.
- Citation: 1986 c. xxi

Dates
- Royal assent: 7 November 1986

Text of statute as originally enacted

Activity in Blyth port in the 20th century was jumpstarted by the impact of World War One and Two. The port became the build site of HMS Ark Royal, as well as a submarine base. Although Blyth suffered severe damage due to bombing raids (notably April 1941, with the bombing of Blyth signal box), Blyth remained an epicentre of wartime production.

By 1930, the port of Blyth was exporting 5.5 million tons of coal, compared to 250,000 tons in 1855. This figure reached its height in the early 1960s, with over 6 million tons of coal being exported. Nonetheless, economic depressions in the 1960s saw the closure of 28 shipyards in the North East of England, including Blyth. This was shortly followed by the decommissioning of the Blyth lighthouse, which was closed in 1985 in favour of modern navigation techniques. However, Blyth maintained some deal of activity such as the opening of Blyth A and Blyth B power stations in 1958 and 1962 respectively. Furthermore, Blyth began to expand its paper import trade from Finland, growing to a peak of over 0.5 million tons in 1998.

By the 20th century, through connection via the London and North Eastern Railway which had leased large amounts of land throughout the port, Blyth had started the growth to become the Europe's largest coal export port, exporting 5.5M tonnes per year by the late 1930s. This was also supplemented by ship building, including the opening of a facility by Hughes, Bolckow and Co of Middlesbrough. Large scale shipbuilding had begun in 1811, and after passing through various hands, in 1880 the first two iron ships were built at Blyth for the Russian government. This led to the foundation of the Blyth Shipbuilding Company on 2 March 1883, building cargo liners, tramp steamers and colliers. With a cargo ship under construction, in 1914 she was purchased by the Admiralty and converted into the Navy's first seaplane carrier Ark Royal. The company returned to commercial ship building, but collapsed in 1925. It was then revived from 1926, but after merger with other local yards and in light of the Wall Street crash and resultant global recession, collapsed again in 1930. Reopened under its original name in 1937, it built various ships in preparation for and during WW2, including the former German cargo ship Hannover which was converted into the escort carrier Audacity. Owned by Mollers (Hong Kong) Ltd post-WW2, it then built cargo-liners for Moller's subsidiary the Lancashire Shipping Company. The construction yard closed in 1967, with only repair work and ship dismantling sustaining business until the yards were demolished in the late 1980s to make room for a paper and timber storage area.

After World War II, whilst most ports began to quickly contract, Blyth was still a major facility through the 1960s, when coal exports reached over 6 M tonnes per year. However, with the closure Blyth's last ship builder in 1966, the port began a significant period of contraction. The employment slack was in part taken up by the construction of the coal-fired Blyth Power Station, located on the northern bank. of the river. The A Station with 480 megawatts (MW) of capacity first generated electricity in 1958, a year after the creation of the Central Electricity Generating Board, and the B Station with a capacity of 1,250 MW four years later. The power stations' four large chimneys were a landmark of the Northumberland skyline for over 40 years; the A Station's two chimneys each stood at 140 metres (460 ft); the B Station's two chimneys were taller, at 170 metres (560 ft) each. They were operated by the successors of the CEGB, including National Power, following the privatisation of the UK's power industry. After their closure in 2001, the stations were demolished over the course of two years, ending with the demolition of the stations' chimneys on 7 December 2003. The establishment of an Alcan aluminium smelting facility in the 1970s 5 mi (8 km) north along the river slowed this decline, as did the import of paper from Finland.

In 1997, the port established Transped, the ports packing business. It has since diversified into logistics areas including import and export packing, customer depot facilities, distribution and storage, ships agency and European and worldwide forwarding.

=== 21st century ===
To this day, Blyth remains as one of the most integral ports in northeast England. The Port of Blyth handles up to 1.5 million tonnes of cargo, mainly containers and RoRo, and some limited volumes of bulk cargos. A2B, a Dutch container company, operate twice-weekly shipping services to Moerdijk, Netherlands, handling deep sea transhipments and short sea cargo, in partnership with Transped connecting the port to Germany, Belgium and Luxembourg. In the past 10 years, Blyth has supported several manufacturing projects by leading tenants such as Texo and Osbit. In more recent years, the port of Blyth has taken up numerous education and apprenticeship opportunities, equipping learners with the skills needed within the sector.

== Economy ==
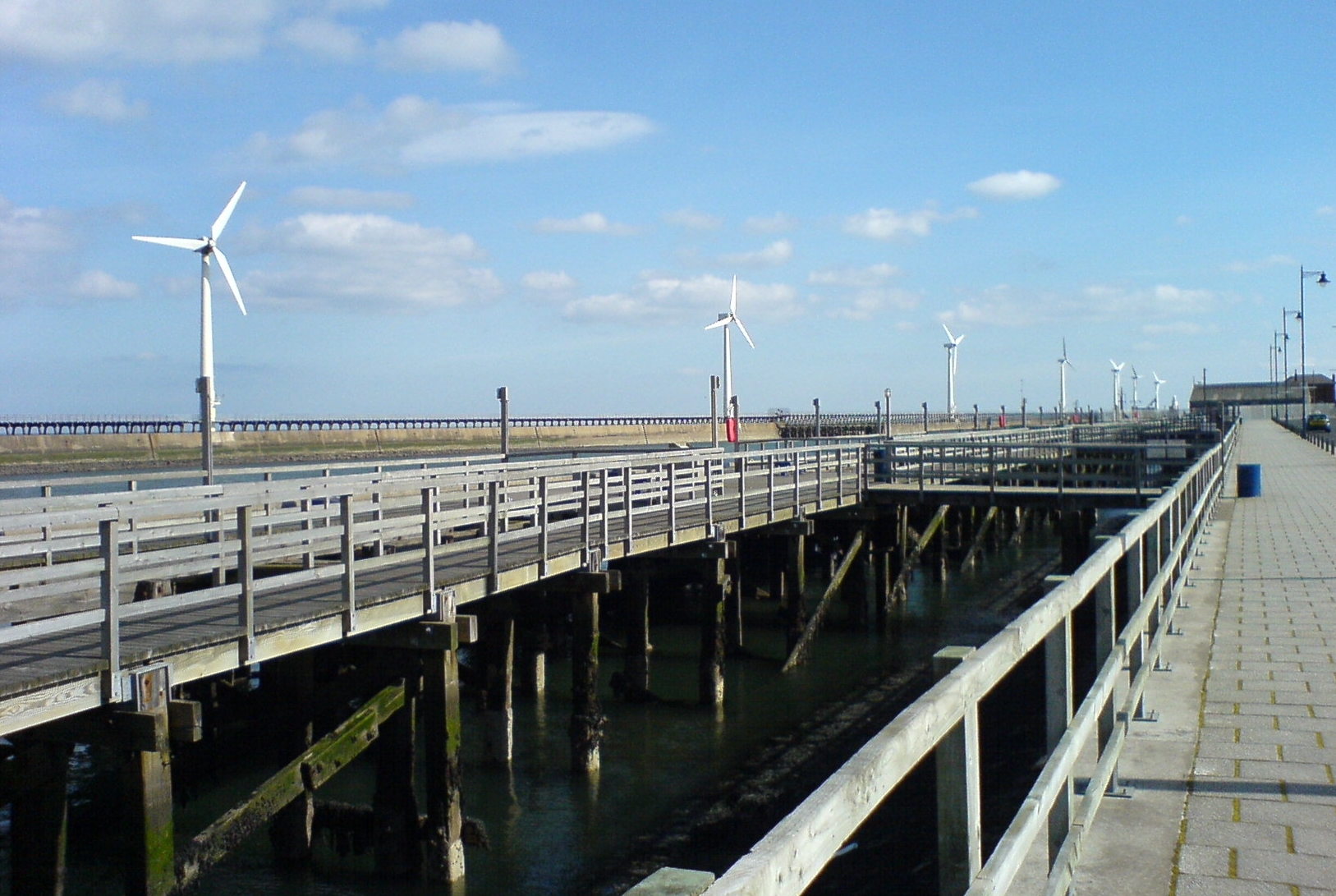
The wind turbines on Blyth pier viewed from the Quayside

=== Industry and commerce ===
With the running down of the coal mining and shipbuilding industries, Blyth largely exists today as a dormitory town in the commuter belt serving Newcastle and North Tyneside. However, its port still remains a major industry in the area, handling over 1.5 million tonnes of cargo annually. Its main trades are forest products, such as paper, pulp and timber, unitised cargo (containers and RoRo), and the import of materials used in the production of aluminium. It also handles the import of a variety of stones and metals. A twice weekly container service between the port and Moerdijk, near Rotterdam, provides connections with the Netherlands, Germany, Belgium, and France as well as South America and the Far East. The port is operated by Port of Blyth, which is the operating division of Blyth Harbour Commission. Port of Blyth is a trust port, which means that it is governed by its own local legislation under the control of an independent board; there are no shareholders and therefore no dividends to support, which allows any surplus to be reinvested in the port.

=== Energy ===
==== Renewables ====
Several renewable energy projects have been established in Blyth. In 1992, Blyth Harbour Wind Farm was constructed along Blyth's East Pier. Consisting of nine wind turbines and with a maximum capacity of 2.7 megawatts, it can provide enough electricity for over 1,500 homes. It was joined in December 2000 by Blyth Offshore Wind Farm, which was composed of two turbines situated 1 kilometre (0.6 mi) out to sea. These was the UK's first two offshore wind turbines. At 2 megawatts each, they were also, when installed, the largest in the world. The wind farm was decommissioned in 2019 by plant owner E.ON. E.ON also commissioned 5 new wind turbines in 2017. These turbines produce 8.3 megawatts of power each, for a combined total of 41.5 megawatts, powering 36,000 homes.

The National Renewable Energy Centre (Narec) is one of five centres of excellence set up by the North East's regional development agency, One NorthEast. It was established in 2002 and is based at Eddie Ferguson House, by the Quayside. Its purpose is to develop and test new energy technologies and equipment that will assist in the transition to a low-carbon economy.

==== Proposed coal power station ====
On 11 May 2007, proposals for a £2 billion coal power station were announced by energy supplier RWE npower. If the plans were go ahead, it was estimated that 1,500 jobs would be created for the construction, with another 200 full-time staff required for the running of the plant, which would open in 2014 on the site of the old power station. The development would see the installation of three 800 megawatt coal-fired units, which would generate enough energy to supply around 3.5 million homes. These plans have, however, met some opposition; many residents living in the area feel that the land should be redeveloped for other purposes, rather than continue to be used as an industrial site. The MP for Wansbeck, Denis Murphy, stated that, although the project would have benefits for the area, he still had concerns; Ronnie Campbell, the MP for Blyth Valley, claimed he would welcome the development as long as it did not have an adverse effect on the overall regeneration of the area.

==== Proposed gigafactory, then data centre ====
In December 2020, Blyth was confirmed as the location for a new Britishvolt battery manufacturing plant. In July 2021, plans for the £2.6bn gigafactory employing 3,000 people were approved, with the new plant to be located on former coalyards adjacent to the now-demolished power station in Cambois, near Blyth. It was to produce lithium-ion batteries for the automotive industry. Britishvolt appointed ISG as its construction partner who began work on clearing the site in late 2021. In January 2022, the UK government invested £100m in the Britishvolt project, alongside asset management company abrdn and its property investment arm Tritax, developing what was planned to be Britain's fourth largest building. However, construction work was halted in August 2022 amid funding concerns, with manufacturing delayed until mid-2025, more than a year later than initially planned. In January 2023, Britishvolt went into administration, and its factory site was put up for sale. In February, Australian firm Recharge Industries announced it had bought Britishvolt out of administration. The takeover related to Britishvolt's battery technology not the site, and in March, Northumberland County Council extended a buy-back clause on the Blyth site, giving Britishvolt's new owners more time to build the gigafactory. However, the negotiations dragged on into the summer of 2023, amid continued uncertainty surrounding the deal and the finances of Recharge's parent, Scale Facilitation.

In April 2024, the site was acquired for construction of a data centre, ending hopes for thousands of manufacturing jobs in the region. However, plans submitted in December 2024 envisaged development of up to 10 data centre buildings totalling up to 540,000sq m, representing an investment of up to £10bn, with 1,200 long-term construction jobs plus employment in the data centres.

=== Urban regeneration ===
Commercial developments in the town centre have also helped to revitalise Blyth. Opened in 1991, the Keel Row Shopping Centre has brought many large high street retailers to the town. Several streets and many derelict buildings, including the old council offices, were cleared away to make way for the development. Adjacent, is the thrice weekly market which is held on Tuesdays, Fridays, and Saturdays. On 14 March 2009, the market was officially reopened following a £3 million refurbishment, which involved the installation of new paving, seating, lighting, and a water feature. The centrepiece is an artwork by Simon Watkinson, named Hyperscope; the 7.5 metres (25 ft) stainless steel column incorporates lighting effects and represents the town's coal mining heritage and history as a wartime submarine base. The aim of the refurbishment is to attract people to the market area when the market is closed, and to bring further investment to the town. However, the project has received criticism; following approval of the proposals in June 2007, concern was raised by Councillor Alisdair Gibbs-Barton, who said that the market place was beginning to resemble a park, and that more trade should be being encouraged. Following the reopening there were also claims that new stalls provided to market traders are unable to withstand adverse weather conditions, and that traders were being overcharged for stall space.

=== Employment ===
The closure of Blyth's male-dominated heavy industries during the latter half of the 20th century led to a shift towards more female-dominated light industries, many of which were based on the new Blyth and Kitty Brewster trading estates. At the 2001 UK census, the industries of employment of residents of Blyth were 19.44% manufacturing, 16.82% retail, 11.82% health and social work, 8.83% construction, 8.58% public administration and defence, 8.33% real estate, 6.69% transport and communications, 5.23% education, 4.53% hotels and catering, 3.13% finance, 0.92% utilities, 0.66% agriculture and forestry, 0.65% mining and quarrying, 0.07% fishing, and 4.29% other industries. The census showed that the economic activity of residents aged 16–74 was 39.35% in full-time employment, 11.82% in part-time employment, 4.65% self-employed, 5.37% unemployed, 1.57% economically active students, 3.02% economically inactive students, 14.42% retired, 6.89% looking after home or family, 9.69% permanently sick or disabled, and 3.23% economically inactive for other reasons.

== Demography ==
Blyth is the largest town in Northumberland; at the 2011 UK census it had a population of 39,731. There were 16,961 households, of which 16,381 (96.6%) had at least one resident. For every 1000 females there were 948 males. The age distribution was 6.1% 0–4 years, 13.2% 5–15 years, 5.2% 16–19 years, 31.4% 20–44 years, 27.7% 45–64 years, and 16.3% 65 years and over. The average age of the population was 39.7 years. The ethnicity of the town was 97.3% white, 1.1% Asian, 0.5% mixed race, and <0.3% black; other ethnic groups made up the remaining 0.1%. The place of birth of residents was 97.6% United Kingdom, 0.1% Republic of Ireland, 1.0% other European countries, and the remainder being from other countries. Religion was recorded as 62.6% Christian, 0.4% Muslim, 0.2% Sikh, 0.1% Buddhist, 0.1% Hindu, and <0.1% Jewish. "Other religion" was stated by 0.4%, "no religion" was stated by 29.7% (up 16.7% since the 2001 census), and 6.6% did not state a religion. Passports were held by 74.2% of residents; 24.8% reported holding no passport. English was spoken as a main language by 98.8% of households.

2011 UK census	Blyth	Blyth Valley	England
Total population	37,339	82,174	53,012,456
Foreign born	2.4%	2.3%	13.8%
White	98.4%	98.7%	85.4%
Asian	1.0%	0.7%	7.8%
Christian	62.6%	64.9%	59.4%
Muslim	0.4%	0.3%	5.0%
No religion	13.0%	13.2%	24.7%
Over 65 years old	16.3%	17.1%	16.4%

Census data for Blyth, 1801–1991
Name	Year	Homes	Male	Female	Total
South Blyth and Newsham Township	1801	–	519	651	1170
South Blyth and Newsham Township	1811	–	718	804	1522
South Blyth and Newsham Township	1821	–	809	996	1805
South Blyth and Newsham Township	1831	246	792	977	1769
South Blyth and Newsham Township	1841	287	791	983	1774
South Blyth and Newsham Township	1851	265	1085	975	2060
South Blyth and Newsham Township	1861	327	971	982	1953
South Blyth and Newsham Township	1871	535	1419	1499	2918
South Blyth and Newsham Township	1881	533	–	–	2831
South Blyth and Newsham Township	1891	634	1884	1844	3728
South Blyth and Newsham Civil Parish	1901	926	2710	2762	5472
Blyth Urban District	1911	1440	3649	3336	6985
Blyth Urban District and Civil Parish	1921	6473	16048	15774	31822
Blyth Municipal Borough and Civil Parish	1931	7218	16008	15672	31680
Blyth Municipal Borough and Civil Parish	1941	–	–	–	–
Blyth Municipal Borough and Civil Parish	1951	10091	17227	17520	34747
Blyth Municipal Borough	1961	11193	17819	18102	35921
Blyth Municipal Borough	1971	12080	16916	17737	34653
Blyth	1981	–	–	–	36466
Blyth Wards	1991	14271	16972	18355	35327

== Education ==
Like most of Northumberland, Blyth has a two-tier school system consisting of primary and secondary schools. The town currently has nine primary schools and two secondary schools (The Blyth Academy and Bede Academy). Until 2009 it also had five middle schools, but these schools were closed as Northumberland County Council decided to switch to a two-tier system of primary and secondary schools.

The Blyth Academy is one of three high schools in Blyth Valley. Opened on 1 September 2000 as Blyth Community College following the amalgamation of Ridley (formerly Newlands) and Tynedale high schools and built on the site of the latter, it is designed to accommodate 1,450 pupils and also serves as a centre for lifelong learning classes. In the town centre is Northumberland College's Blyth centre, as well as the public library, which holds a large collection of local studies resources.

As part of a "poverty proofing" initiative, St Wilfrid's Primary School banned pencil cases in 2018, as part of a charity initiative to avoid poorer pupils being viewed negatively for lacking designer goods.

=== Bede Academy ===
Bede Academy, a school for children aged 3 to 18 sponsored by Sir Peter Vardy through the Emmanuel Schools Foundation, opened in September 2009. Bede Academy is built on the former grounds of Ridley High School (formerly Newlands). The school was formed with an engineering and enterprise specialism in mind, to complement Blyth's historic industrial roots. In October 2022, the school appeared in an episode of the BBC programme We are England – Educating Blyth. The episode followed the daily life of four students at home, at school and at the workplace, as they endeavour to become the engineers of the future and contribute to Blyth's resurgence as a modern industrial powerhouse.

The Dales School is a special education school. In July 2021, it received a Class 144 train. In April 2019, Blyth won a government bid to establish an 80-place special school for children with specific learning difficulties. The proposed site is the former Princess Louise First School.

In October 2020, Blyth was awarded government funding to establish mental health support teams in schools. The scheme, which requires the county's mental health services to see children within four weeks of referral, is planned to be rolled out by December 2020.

=== Energy Central Campus ===
The Energy Central Campus is an educational development offering sector-specific training in offshore renewable energy. It is a partnership between the Port of Blyth, the Offshore Renewable Energy Catapult and Northumberland County Council. The first phase, the Energy Central Learning Hub, opened in 2024. This offers level two diplomas and T-levels in partnership with Bede Academy. The second phase, the Energy Central Institute, began construction in October 2026 adjacent to the market square in Blyth town centre. It will deliver higher education qualifications up to PhD level in partnership with Durham University and Newcastle University.

== Media ==
Local news and television programmes are provided by BBC North East and Cumbria and ITV Tyne Tees. Television signals are received from either the Pontop Pike or Chatton TV transmitters.

Local radio stations are BBC Radio Newcastle, Capital North East, Heart North East, Smooth North East, Greatest Hits Radio North East, Hits Radio North East and Koast Radio, a community based radio station which broadcast on 106.6 FM.

The town is served by the local newspapers, Northumberland Gazette (formerly The News Post Leader) and Evening Chronicle.

== Entertainment and leisure ==
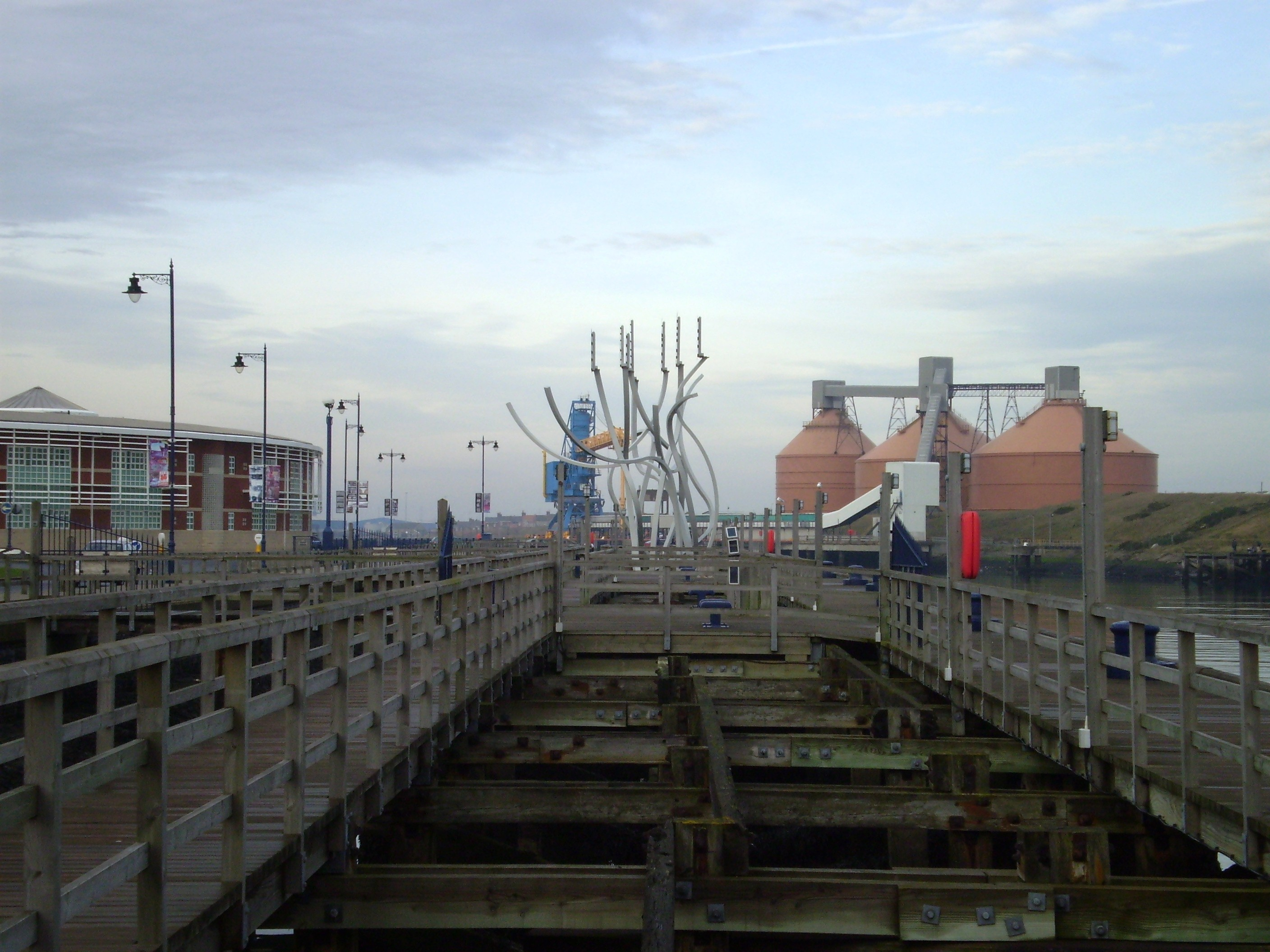
A view of the Quayside showing the Spirit of the Staithes sculpture. To the right are the Alcan silos at North Blyth.

=== Sport and recreation ===
The town is home to the non-League football club, Blyth Spartans. Founded in 1899, and play their home games at Croft Park. They are notable for their "giant-killing" feats in the FA Cup, particularly those of the 1977–78 season, when they reached the fifth round. The town's other non-League football club is Blyth Town, who were established in 1995 and play in the Wade Associates Northern Alliance Premier Division. Also based in Blyth are Blyth Cricket Club and Blyth RFC. Blyth Cricket Club was formed in 1883 and presently compete in the Northumberland & Tyneside Cricket League Division 3. Blyth Cricket Club were Northumberland & Tyneside Cricket League Division 4 champions in the 2020 season and Northumberland Premier League champions in 2017.

Blyth Sports Centre offers a wide range of facilities including two swimming pools, a sports hall, squash courts, fitness suite, saunas, outdoor skate park, and more. Blyth Golf Club is situated on the outskirts of the town at New Delaval, and has an 18-hole course with a par of 72. Royal Northumberland Yacht Club has its headquarters in the South Harbour. RNYC offers crewing and sailing opportunities and is a Royal Yachting Association Training Centre for sail cruising and powerboating for its members.

=== Parks and open spaces ===
Ridley Park was created on land handed over by Viscount Matthew White Ridley and was opened on 27 July 1904. In June 2005, a £602,000 regeneration project was completed, which saw the installation of a children's water play area and upgrading of existing play facilities at the southern end of the park. The Quayside is a stretch of the riverfront that was once a centre of Blyth's industry, where coal would be loaded from trains onto ships for export, but having undergone major redevelopment, it is now a clean and peaceful area. Notable features of the Quayside include the "Spirit of the Staithes" sculpture and eleven "solar sound posts" which, when approached, replay pre-recorded stories relating to the port told by local people.

Blyth's largest and most natural open space is its beach and sand dunes, which stretch from the mouth of the river to Seaton Sluice. The dunes were declared a Local Nature Reserve by Blyth Valley Borough Council in December 2003, and are also an area of Special Nature Conservation Interest. They are notable for their diverse range of plant life, butterflies, moths, and birds, as well as being one of only two coastal locations in the country inhabited by both species of banded land snail—Cepaea nemoralis and Cepaea hortensis.

== Landmarks and places of interest ==
Blyth High Light
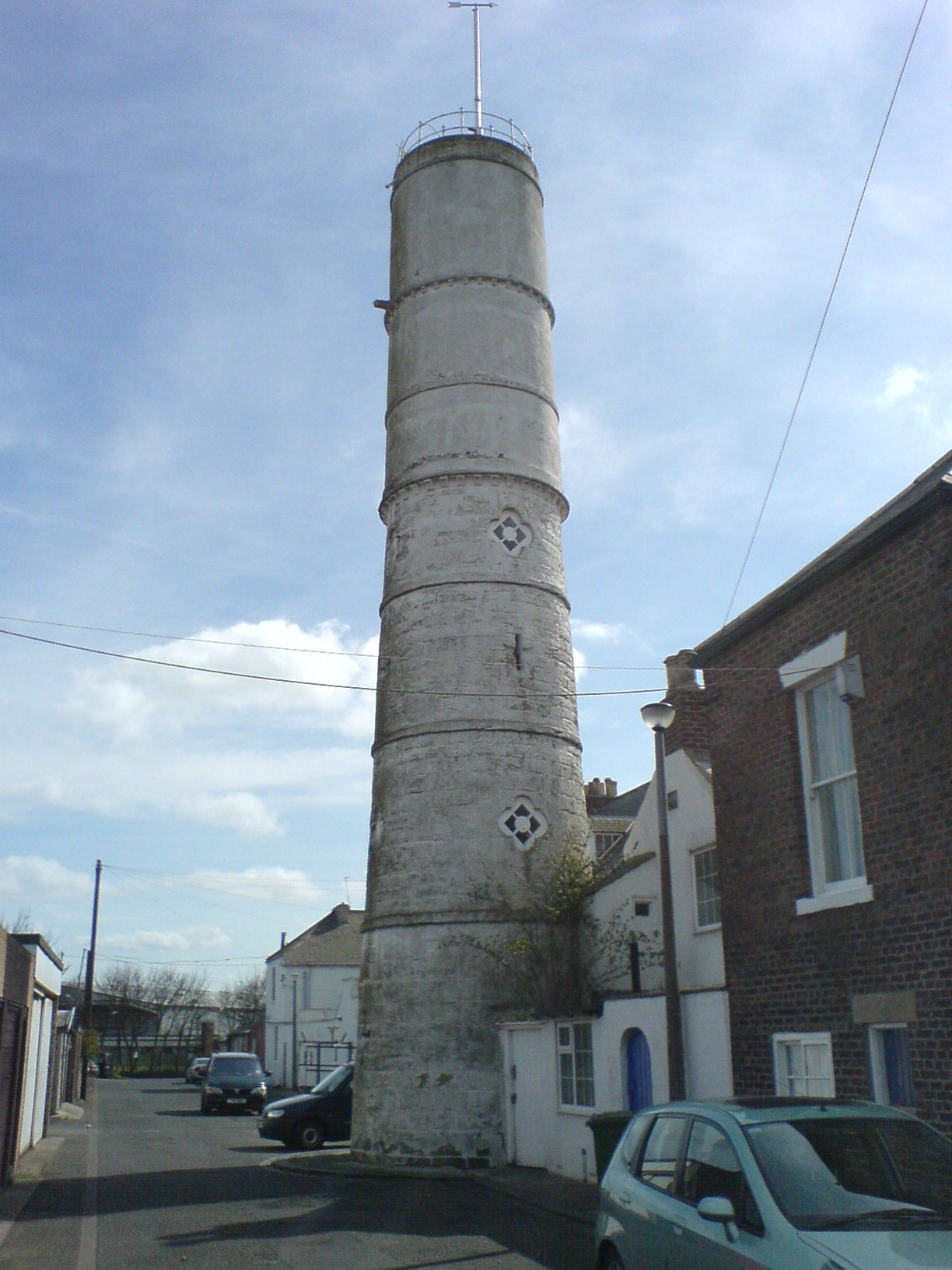
- Location: Blyth, United Kingdom
- OS grid: NZ3198081346
- Coordinates: 55°07′32″N 1°30′00″W

Tower
- Constructed: 1788
- Construction: stone (later additions in brick)
- Height: 18.74 m (61 ft 6 in)
- Shape: cylindrical tower and no lantern
- Heritage: Grade II listed building

Light
- Deactivated: 1985

The "Spirit of the Staithes" sculpture on Blyth's Quayside was unveiled by Princess Anne on 28 May 2003. As part of the overall regeneration of the Quayside, it was commissioned by Blyth Valley Council in conjunction with Northern Arts and created by the artist Simon Packard. Standing 15 metres (50 ft) high and 7 metres (22 ft) wide, it represents the heritage of coal distribution in Europe, an industry in which Blyth was the largest exporter.

The "High Light" lighthouse is one of Blyth's oldest structures. It stands to the rear of Bath Terrace and is 18.74 m (61 ft 6 in) tall. Built in three stages, the first section was constructed in 1788 to a height of 10.66 m (35 ft 0 in); a further 4.26 m (14 ft 0 in) was added in 1888, and the final 3.82 m (12 ft 6 in) was added in 1900. The original oil-fired lamp had a range of 10 nautical miles (19 km); it was upgraded to gas in 1857 and electricity in 1932. Prior to land reclamation in the late 19th century, the lighthouse had been much closer to the quayside. At some stage it became the rear of a pair of leading lights, and known as the 'High Light'; the corresponding 'low light' has long since been demolished. Blyth High Light was deactivated in 1985 and listed Grade II on 15 July 1987.

Before their demolition, the four chimneys of Blyth Power Station dominated the landscape along the coast. Two were 167 m (548 ft) high, the other two were 137 m (449 ft) high, and they were visible for many miles.

On the north side of the River Blyth are the remains of the railway coal staithes which featured in the chase scene at the end of the 1971 film Get Carter, starring Michael Caine.

== Notable people ==
- Mark Knopfler, musician and co-founder of Dire Straits
- David Knopfler, rhythm guitarist of Dire Straits, brother of Mark
- Dan Burn, Newcastle United football player.
- Macaulay Gillesphey, Charlton Athletic football player.
- Jean Heywood, actress
- Matthew Tate, coal miner and poet
- Paul Lamb, harmonica player
- Clem Stephenson, Aston Villa football player

== See also ==
- Blyth Shipbuilding Company
- Headway Arts
- Wellesley Nautical School
