= Cowpen =

Area of Blyth, Northumberland, England

Coordinates: 55.127°N 1.539°W

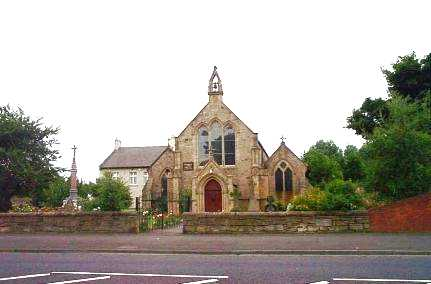
- The Church of St Cuthbert

- Location within Northumberland
- Population: 4,466
- OS grid reference: NZ295815
- Civil parish: Blyth
- Unitary authority: Northumberland
- Ceremonial county: Northumberland
- Region: North East
- Country: England
- Sovereign state: United Kingdom
- Post town: BLYTH
- Postcode district: NE24
- Dialling code: 01670
- Police: Northumbria
- Fire: Northumberland
- Ambulance: North East
- UK Parliament: Blyth and Ashington

Cowpen /ˈkuːpən/ is an area of Blyth, in the civil parish of Blyth in the county of Northumberland, England. It is just east of the A189 road. The Ward population taken at the 2011 census was 4,466.

In the 12th century CE, its name was Cupum, possibly the dative plural of Old Norse kupa, "a cuplike depression or valley".

== Governance ==
Cowpen was formerly a township in Horton parish, from 1866 Cowpen was a civil parish in its own right until it was abolished on 1 April 1920 to form Blyth. In 1911 the parish had a population of 21,295.
