= Narec =

Offshore energy research organisation

National Renewable Energy Centre
- Company type: Not for profit company
- Industry: Renewable energy Energy efficiency
- Founded: 2002
- Founder: One NorthEast
- Headquarters: Blyth, Northumberland, England
- Key people: Andrew Jamieson (CEO)
- Services: Testing; Certification; Demonstration
- Website: ore.catapult.org.uk

Narec, since 2014 known as the National Renewable Energy Centre, is a part of the Offshore Renewable Energy (ORE) Catapult, a British technology innovation and research centre for offshore wind power, wave energy, tidal energy and low carbon technologies. ORE Catapult's head office is in Glasgow, Scotland. The centre operates multi-purpose offshore renewable energy test and demonstration facilities. It is similar to other centres, such as NREL in the US and National Centre for Renewable Energies (CENER) in Spain. The National Renewable Energy Centre is based in Blyth, Northumberland.

== History ==
Originally known as NaREC (New and Renewable Energy Centre), the centre was created in 2002 by One NorthEast, the North East regional development agency, as part of the Strategy for Success programme. In 2010 the organisation changed its name to Narec (National Renewable Energy Centre). In April 2014, the organisation merged with the Offshore Renewable Energy (ORE) Catapult to focus on the development and cost reduction of offshore wind, wave and tidal energy across the UK.

The organisation was originally involved in a wide range of technologies, including:

- Wind (onshore and offshore)
- Transmission and distribution
- Photovoltaics
- Oil and gas
- Marine renewables
- Fuel cells
- Microrenewables
- Biomass

In 2010, due to UK government cutbacks, Narec closed, sold off or separated parts of the business. Spin-off companies include:

Decerna – Working on energy efficiency, solar farm design, preparation of MW-scale battery sites, grid connection, and life-cycle assessment. The company was renamed from Narec Distributed Energy Limited in 2022.

Solar Capture Technologies – Specialises on bespoke and novel solar photovoltaic systems, including off-grid systems. Renamed from Narec Solar in 2013.

NCL Technology Ventures – A specialist healthcare investor, originally created by Narec and Ashberg Limited. Renamed from Narec Capital in 2013.

Renewable Risk Advisers Limited – renamed from Narec Capital Risk Solutions Limited in 2012.

Following its merger with ORE Catapult, the National Renewable Energy Centre now focuses on helping to de-risk and accelerate the development and commercialisation of the offshore renewable energy industry in the UK.

== Operations ==
The National Renewable Energy Centre is involved in:

=== Wind turbine rotor blades ===
Product certification, verification and investigations for the next generation offshore wind turbines.

=== Power trains and components ===
3 MW and 15 MW facilities that can perform independent performance and reliability assessments of full systems and components.

=== Electrical networks ===
UKAS accredited laboratories with specialist test and measurement facilities to help develop technologies needed for developing power systems and exploring life extension opportunities for ageing assets.

=== Subsea trials and demonstrations ===
Controlled onshore salt water location for all stages of technology development.

=== Resource measurement and assessment ===
Open access facility for testing, calibrating and verifying remote sensor technologies

== Closed facilities ==
=== Clothier High Voltage Laboratory ===
The Clothier Electrical Testing Laboratory was opened in 1970 by A. Reyrolle & Company. Narec took over the facility in 2004, to use it to test the robustness of electrical infrastructure offshore locations to onshore sites.

Although one of the few high voltage testing facilities in the world, the facility was closed by Narec in 2011 due to a lack of government funding. Many parts of the lab were relocated to Narec's main campus in Blyth. The ruins of the original lab are now the property of Siemens.

== Current facilities ==
=== Charles Parsons Technology Centre ===
Built in 2004, this £5m facility contains a low voltage electrical laboratory for the testing of connecting renewable energy systems to the transmission and distribution grid. Some of the equipment and staff from the closed Narec Clothier Electrical Testing Laboratory were moved to this facility.

=== Training tower ===
This is a 27m high tower, for training of offshore wind technicians.

=== Dry docks ===
Tests marine devices with three modified dry docks.

=== Power train test facilities – 3MW and 15MW ===
Facilities that can perform independent performance and reliability assessments of full systems and components.

=== Blade test 1 & 2 ===
The blade testing facilities at National Renewable Energy Centre are designed to test wind turbine blades up to 100m in length. Blades are tested using a Compact Resonant Mass (CRM) system. ORE Catapult is working on a technique of blade testing known as "Dual Axis".

== European funded research ==
ORE Catapult is involved in a number of European funded research projects including Tidal EC, Optimus and LIFES50+.

== Conferences and papers ==
Narec staff have written papers which have appeared in journals and international energy conferences. These are mainly in the subjects of photovoltaics, wind, marine, and electrical infrastructure. A short list of some of these is given below:

- Snapper, An efficient and compact direct electric power take-off device for wave energy converters.
- Availability and Estimation of Marine Renewable Energy Resources
- Marine Renewables: A Development Route Map for the UK
- Bivariate empirical mode decomposition and its contribution to wind turbine condition monitoring
- Experimental tests of an air-cored PM tubular generator for direct drive wave energy converters
- Fatigue testing of wind turbine blades with computational verification.
- Ensuring Reliability for Offshore Wind – Large Testing Facilities.
- Accelerating Technology Development for Round 3 Offshore Deployment.
- Electrical Network Testing & Simulation: An effective method of testing the fault ride through capabilities of Small Scale Distributed Generation
- Ensuring Reliability for Marine Renewable Drive Train Systems – Nautilus Testing Facilities
- LGBC Silicon Solar Cell with modified bus bar suitable for high volume wire bonding
- Process and device modelling for enhancement of silicon solar cell efficiency
- An intelligent approach to the condition monitoring of large scale wind turbines
- Lightning Arresters and Substation Protection
- Study on laser parameters for silicon solar cells with LCP selective emitters
- Low Cost, 100X point focus silicon concentrator cells made by the LGBC process
- Laser Grooved Buried Contact Concentrator Solar Cells
- Studying the Groove Profiles Produced for Fine Line Screen Printed Front Contacts in Laser Grooved Buried Contact Solar Cells.
- Investigation of cross wafer uniformity of production line produced LGBC concentrator solar cells
- Process Development of Coloured LGBC Solar Cells for BIPV Applications
- Process optimisation for coloured laser grooved buried contact solar cells
- Colour and Shape in Laser Grooved Buried Contact Solar Cells for Applications in the Built Environment
- Fine-Line Screen Printing in Large Area Laser Grooved, Buried Contact Silicon Solar Cells
- Progress of the LAB2LINE Laser Grooved Buried Contact Screen Printed Solar Cells Hybrid p-type Monocrystalline Process
- Development of Laser Fired Contact (LFC) Rear Passivated Laser Groove Buried Contact (LGBC) Solar Cells Using Thin Wafers
- The LAB2LINE laser grooved buried contact screen printed solar cells hybrid p-type monocrystaline process
- Integrated process and device 'TCAD' for enhancement of C-Si solar cell efficiency
- Screen printing in laser grooved buried contact solar cells: The LAB2LINE hybrid processes
- Surface passivation by silicon nitride in Laser Grooved Buried Contact (LGBC) silicon solar cells
- Optimisation of the front contact for low to medium concentrations in LGBC silicon solar cells
- Laser Grooved Buried Contact Solar Cells for Concentration Factors up to 100X
- Device Design and Process Optimisation for LGBC Solar Cells for Use Between 50X and 100X Concentration
- Design and Optimisation of Laser Grooved Buried Contact Solar Cells for Use At Concentration Factors Up To 100X
- Development of Laser Grooved Buried Contact Solar Cells for Use at Concentration Factors up to 100X
- Front contact modelling of monocrystaline silicon laser grooved buried contact solar cells
- Laser Grooved Buried Contact Concentrator Cells
- PC1D modelling of the efficiency of laser grooved buried contact solar cells designed for use at concentration factors up to 100X
- Front Dicing Technique for Pre-isolation of Concentrator Silicon Solar Cells
- Environmental sustainability of concentrator PV systems: Preliminary LCA results of the APOLLON project
- Process development of shape and colour in LGBC solar cells for BIPV applications
- A summary of the Havemor project – Process development of shaped and coloured solar cells for BIPV applications
- Process and device modelling for enhancement of silicon solar cell efficiency
- Technological and Financial Aspects of Laser Grooved Buried Contact Silicon Solar Cell Based Concentrator Systems
- First results on the APOLLON project multi-approach for high efficiency integrated and intelligent concentrating PV modules (systems)
