= Blyth Harbour Wind Farm =

Wind farm in East Bedlington, Blyth, Northumberland, England

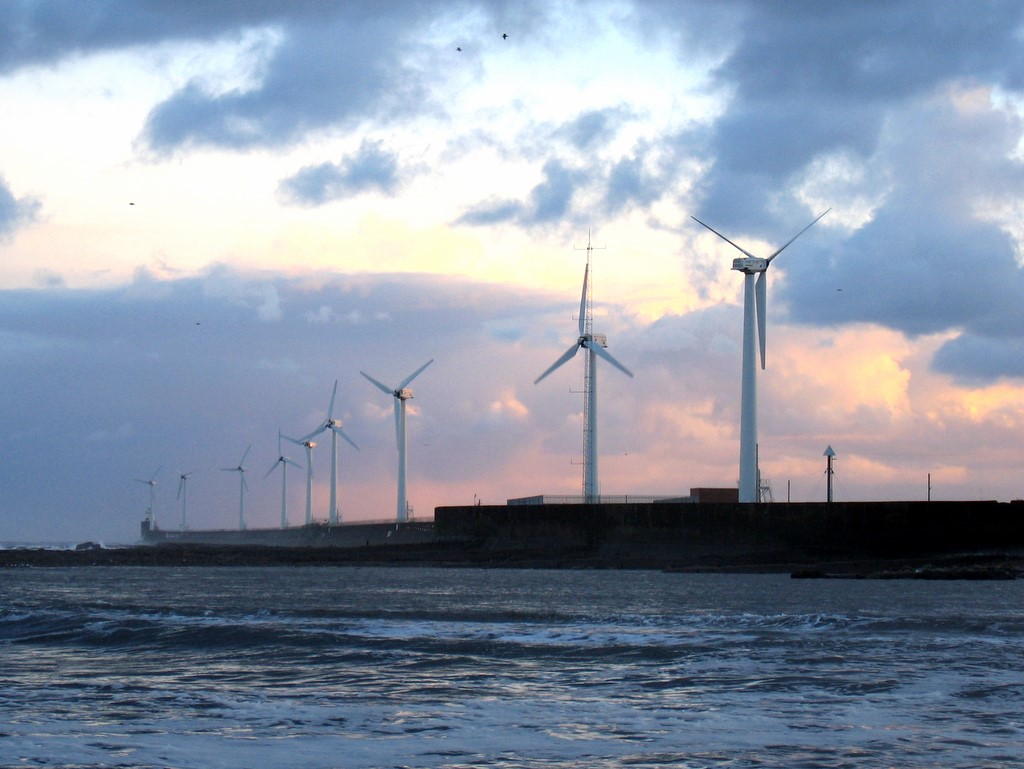
- Country: England, United Kingdom
- Location: East Bedlington at the Port of Blyth, Northumberland
- Coordinates: 55.1222°N 1.49027°W
- Status: Operational
- Commission date: January 1993
- Owner: Hainsford Developments (Blyth Harbour) Limited
- Site elevation: 5 ft

Power generation
- Units operational: 9 × 0.3 MW
- Make and model: WindMaster
- Nameplate capacity: 2.7 MW

External links
- Commons: Related media on Commons

Blyth Harbour Wind Farm is a coastal wind farm located in East Bedlington along the East Pier of the Port of Blyth. Commissioned in January 1993 it consists of nine 0.3 MW WindMaster turbines giving a total capacity of 2.7 MW. It was developed by AMEC Wind and is owned by Hainsford Developments (Blyth Harbour) Limited.

== Repowering ==
In January 2008, consent was granted to replace the existing nine turbines with seven new ones. Six of these would generate 2.5 MW each, while a seventh larger turbine was planned to produce 7.58 MW. At 163 m (535 ft) tall, it was expected to be the largest land-based turbine in Europe.

As of September 2012, the first new turbine became operational, producing up to 3.4 MW of power (more than the original nine turbines combined). The turbine is a REpower 3.4M104, with a 76 m hub height.
