= List of closed railway stations in Great Britain: H–J =

The list of closed railway stations in Great Britain includes the following: Year of closure is given if known. Stations reopened as heritage railways continue to be included in this list and some have been linked. Some stations have been reopened to passenger traffic. Some lines remain in use for freight and mineral traffic.

== H ==
=== Ha ===
Station (Town, unless in station name)	Rail company	Year closed	Notes
Hacheston Halt	GER	1952	
Hackney	North London Railway	1944	new station opened 1980
Haddenham (Bucks)	Great Western and Great Central Joint Railway	1963	
Haddenham (Cambridgeshire)	GER	1931	
Haddington	North British Railway	1949	
Haddiscoe	Norfolk Railway	1904	
Haddiscoe High Level	GER	1959	
Hadham	GER	1964	
Hadleigh	GER	1932	
Hadley	LNWR	1964	
Hadlow Road	Chester and Birkenhead Railway	1956	
Hadnall	L&NWR	1960	
Hadnock Halt	British Railways	1959	
Hafod Garregog	Welsh Highland Railway	1936	
Hafod Ruffydd	Welsh Highland Railway	1936	
Hafodyrynys Platform	GWR	1964	
Hafod y Llyn (1st)	Welsh Highland Railway	1936	
Hafod y Llyn (2nd)	Welsh Highland Railway	2010	
Haggerleases	Stockton and Darlington Railway	1859	
Haggerston	North London Railway	1940	reopened 2010
Hagley Road	LNWR	1934	
Haigh	Lancashire and Yorkshire Railway	1965	
Hailes Halt	LM&SR	1943	
Hailsham	London, Brighton and South Coast Railway	1968	
Hainton Street Halt	GNR	1961	
Hakin Docks	Milford Docks Company	1890	approximate date
Halbeath	North British Railway	1930	
Halberton Halt	GWR	1964	
Halebank	LNWR	1958	
Halesowen	Great Western Railway/Midland Railway Joint	1958	
Halesworth	Southwold Railway	1929	
Halewood	Cheshire Lines Committee	1951	new station opened 1988
Halifax North Bridge	Halifax and Ovenden Junction Railway	1955	
Halifax St. Pauls	Halifax High Level Railway	1917	
Halkirk	Sutherland and Caithness Railway	1960	
Hallaton	Great Northern and London and North Western Joint Railway	1953	
Hallatrow	Bristol and North Somerset Railway	1959	
Hallcraig Street (Airdrie)	North British Railway	1870	
Hallen Halt	GWR	1918	
Hallington	GNR	1951	
Halmerend	North Staffordshire Railway	1931	
Halsall	Lancashire and Yorkshire Railway	1938	
Halstead	Colne Valley and Halstead Railway	1962	
Halton (Cheshire)	Chester and Birkenhead Railway	1952	
Halton (Lancashire)	Midland Railway	1966	
Halton Dial	Leeds and Selby Railway	1864	
Halton Holegate	GNR	1939	
Halwill (also "Halwill and Beaworthy")	London and South Western Railway/North Cornwall Railway	1966	
Ham Green Halt	GWR	1964	
Ham Lane	Weston, Clevedon and Portishead Railway	1940	
Ham Mill Halt	GWR	1964	
Ham Platform (Lewes)	London, Brighton and South Coast Railway	1857	
Hambleton	NER	1959	
Hamilton (NBR)	North British Railway	1952	
Hammersmith and Chiswick	North and South Western Junction Railway	1917	
Hammersmith (Grove Road)	London and South Western Railway	1916	
Hammerwich	LNWR	1965	
Hampole	West Riding and Grimsby Railway	1952	
Hampstead Norris	GWR	1962	
Hampstead Road	North London Railway	1855	
Hampsthwaite	NER	1950	
Hampton Loade	GWR	1963	reopened by Severn Valley Railway
Hampton Row Halt	GWR	1917	
Hampton-in-Arden (1st)	Midland Railway	1884	
Hampton-in-Arden (2nd)	Midland Railway	1917	
Hamworthy (originally Poole – first station)	LSWR	1896	
Handsworth and Smethwick	GWR	1972	
Handsworth Wood	LNWR	1941	
Hanford Road Halt	North Staffordshire Railway	1913	
Hanley	North Staffordshire Railway	1964	
Hanley Road (Malvern)	Midland Railway	1952	
Hannington	GWR	1953	
Hanwood	Shrewsbury and Welshpool Railway	1960	
Hanwood Road	Potteries, Shrewsbury and North Wales Railway	1933	
Happendon	Caledonian Railway	1964	
Harborne	LNWR	1934	
Harburn	Caledonian Railway	1966	
Harby and Stathern	Great Northern and London and North Western Joint Railway	1953	
Hardingham	GER	1969	
Hardley Halt	British Railways	1965	
Hare Park and Crofton	West Riding and Grimsby Railway	1952	
Haresfield	Midland Railway	1965	
Harker	North British Railway	1929	
Harlesden for West Willesden	Midland Railway	1902	
Harleston	GER	1953	
Harlington Halt (Yorkshire)	Dearne Valley Railway	1951	
Harmston	GNR	1962	
Harpenden East	GNR	1965	
Harperley	NER	1953	
Harrington (Church Road Halt)	Cleator & Workington Junction Railway	1926 public	workers' services continued to 1929
Harringworth	Midland Railway	1948	
Harrogate (Brunswick)	York and North Midland Railway	1862	
Harston	GER	1963	
Hart	NER	1953	
Hartfield	London, Brighton and South Coast Railway	1967	
Hartington	LNWR	1954	special service continued until 1963
Hartington Road Halt	London, Brighton and South Coast Railway	1911	
Hartlepool (Headland)	NER	1947	
Hartley	NER	1964	
Hartley Pit	Blyth and Tyne Railway	1851	
Harton Road	GWR	1951	
Hart's Hill and Woodside	GWR	1917	
Hartshill and Basford Halt	North Staffordshire Railway	1926	
Harty Road Halt	Sheppey Light Railway	1950	
Harvington	Midland Railway	1963	
Harwich Parkeston Quay West	LNER	1972	
Haslingden	Lancashire and Yorkshire Railway	1960	
Hassall Green	North Staffordshire Railway	1930	
Hassendean	North British Railway	1969	
Hassop	Midland Railway	1942	
Haswell (1st)	NER	1877	
Haswell (2nd)	NER	1952	
Hatch	GWR	1962	
Hatfield	Eastern Counties Railway	1849	
Hatfield Hyde Halt	GNR	1905	
Hatherleigh	Southern Railway	1965	
Hathern	Midland Railway	1960	
Hatton (Aberdeen)	Great North of Scotland Railway	1932	
Hatton (Tayside)	Dundee, Perth and Aberdeen Junction Railway	1865	
Haughley (MSLR)	Mid-Suffolk Light Railway	1939	
Haughley	GER	1967	
Haughley Road	GER	1849	
Haughton	LNWR	1949	
Haughton Halt	GWR	1960	
Havant New	L&SWR	1859	
Havenstreet	Isle of Wight Central Railway	1966	reopened 1971
Haverhill	GER	1967	
Haverhill South	Colne Valley and Halstead Railway	1924	
Haverstock Hill	Midland Railway	1916	
Haverthwaite	Furness Railway	1946	reopened 1973
Haverton Hill	NER	1954	
Hawes	Midland Railway/North Eastern Railway Joint	1959	
Hawick (1st)	North British Railway	1862	
Hawick (2nd)	North British Railway	1969	
Hawkesbury Lane	LNWR	1965	
Hawkhead	G&SWR	1966	reopened 1991
Hawkhurst	SER	1961	
Hawsker	NER	1965	
Haxby	NER	1930	
Haxey and Epworth	Great Northern and Great Eastern Joint Railway	1959	
Haxey Junction	Isle of Axholme Joint Railway	1933	
Haxey Town	Isle of Axholme Joint Railway	1933	
Hay-on-Wye	Midland Railway	1962	
Hayburn Wyke	NER	1965	
Haydock	Great Central Railway	1952	
Haydock Park	Great Central Railway	1963	
Haydock Park Racecourse	London and North Western Railway	1902	
Hayfield	Great Central Railway/Midland Railway	1970	
Hayles Abbey Halt	GWR	1960	reopened 2017
Hayling Island	London, Brighton and South Coast Railway	1963	
Haywood	Caledonian Railway	1951	
Hazel Grove (Midland)	Midland Railway	1917	
Hazelwell	Midland Railway	1941	Reopened 2026 as Pineapple Road
Hazelwood	Midland Railway	1947	
Hazlehead Bridge	Manchester, Sheffield and Lincolnshire Railway/Great Central Railway	1950	

=== He ===
Station (Town, unless in station name)	Rail company	Year closed	Notes
Heacham	GER	1969	
Headcorn Junction	Kent and East Sussex Railway	1954	
Headless Cross	Wilsontown, Morningside and Coltness Railway	1852	
Heads Nook	NER	1967	
Heads of Ayr	Glasgow and South Western Railway	1933	
Heads of Ayr Holiday Camp	LMSR	1968	
Healey House	Lancashire and Yorkshire Railway	1949	
Heanor Great Northern	GNR	1939	
Heanor Midland	Midland Railway	1926	
Heapey	Lancashire and Yorkshire Railway & Lancashire Union Railway joint	1960	
Heath	Great Central Railway	1963	
Heath Park Halt (Hemel Hempstead)	Midland Railway	1947	
Heath Town	Midland Railway	1910	
Heather and Ibstock	Ashby and Nuneaton Joint Railway	1931	
Heathey Lane Halt	Lancashire and Yorkshire Railway	1938	
Heathfield (Devon)	GWR	1959	
Heathfield (East Sussex)	London, Brighton and South Coast Railway	1965	
Heathrow Junction	Heathrow Express	1998	
Heatley & Warburton	L&NWR	1962	
Heaton	NER	1980	
Heaton Lodge	L&NWR	1864	
Heaton Mersey	Midland Railway	1961	
Heaton Norris	L&NWR	1959	
Heck	NER	1958	
Heckmondwike	Lancashire and Yorkshire Railway	1965	
Heckmondwike Spen	L&NWR	1953	
Heddon-on-the-Wall	NER	1958	
Hedgeley	NER	1930	
Hednesford	L&NWR	1965	reopened 1989
Hedon	NER	1964	
Hedon Racecourse	North Eastern Railway	1948	
Heeley	Midland Railway	1968	
Hele and Bradninch	GWR	1964	
Hellesdon	Midland and Great Northern Joint Railway	1952	
Hellingly	London, Brighton and South Coast Railway	1965	
Helmdon	Great Central Railway	1963	
Helmdon Village	Stratford-upon-Avon and Midland Junction Railway	1951	
Helmshore	Lancashire and Yorkshire Railway	1966	
Helmsley	NER	1953	
Helpringham	Great Northern and Great Eastern Joint Railway	1955	
Helpston	Midland Railway	1966	
Helsby and Alvanley	Cheshire Lines Committee	1964	
Helston	GWR	1962	
Hemel Hempsted (Midland)	Midland Railway	1947	
Hemingbrough	NER	1967	
Hemsby	Midland and Great Northern Joint Railway	1959	
Hemsworth	West Riding and Grimsby Railway	1967	
Hemsworth and South Kirkby	Hull and Barnsley Railway	1932	
Hemyock	GWR (Culm Valley Light Railway)	1963	
Henbury	GWR	1964	
Hendford	Bristol and Exeter Railway/GWR	1861	
Hendford Halt	GWR	1964	
Hendon (NER)	NER	1879	
Hendon Burn (Co. Durham)	Londonderry (Seaham to Sunderland) Railway	1868	
Hendreforgan	GWR	1930	
Henfield	London, Brighton and South Coast Railway	1966	
Hengoed High Level	GWR	1964	
Henham Halt	GER	1952	
Henllan	GWR	1952	
Henlow Camp	Midland Railway	1962	
Henstridge	Somerset and Dorset Joint Railway	1966	
Henwick	GWR	1965	
Heolgerrig Halt	GWR/LMS Joint Railway	1961	
Hepscott	NER	1950	
Herber Toll Gate	Glyn Valley Tramway	1881	
Herculaneum Dock	Liverpool Overhead Railway	1956	
Hereford Barton	Great Western Railway	1893	
Hereford Moorfields	Midland Railway	1874	
Heriot	North British Railway	1969	
Hermitage	GWR	1962	
Herriard	London and South Western Railway	1932	
Hertford Cowbridge	Great Northern Railway	1924	
Hertingfordbury	GNR	1951	
Hesketh Bank	Lancashire and Yorkshire Railway	1964	
Hesketh Park	Lancashire and Yorkshire Railway	1964	
Hesleden	NER	1952	
Heslerton	NER	1930	
Hessay	NER	1958	
Hessle Road (Hull)	NER	1853	
Hest Bank	L&NWR	1969	
Heswall	Birkenhead Railway	1956	
Hethersett	GER	1966	
Hetton	NER	1953	
Heversham	Furness Railway	1942	
Hexthorpe	South Yorkshire Railway	1855	
Hey's Crossing Halt	Lancashire and Yorkshire Railway	1851	
Heysham Harbour	Midland Railway	1975	reopened 1987
Heytesbury	GWR	1955	
Heywood	Lancashire and Yorkshire Railway	1970	reopened 2003 by East Lancashire Railway

=== Hi ===
Station (Town, unless in station name)	Rail company	Year closed	Notes
Hickleton and Thurnscoe Halt	Hull and Barnsley Railway	1929	
High Blaithwaite	Maryport and Carlisle Railway	1921	
High Blantyre	Caledonian Railway	1945	
High Field	NER	1954	
High Halden Road	Kent and East Sussex Light Railway	1954	
High Halstow Halt	South Eastern and Chatham Railway	1961	
High Harrington	Cleator and Workington Junction Railway	1931	
High Lane	Great Central and North Staffordshire Joint Railway	1970	
High Rocks Halt	London, Brighton and South Coast Railway	1952	new station opened on different site by Spa Valley Railway
High Royds	Great Central Railway	1856	
High Shields (1st)	NER	1879	
High Shields (2nd)	NER	1981	
High Street (Manchester)	Manchester Metrolink	1998	
High Westwood	NER	1942	
Higham (Suffolk)	GER	1967	
Higham Ferrers	Midland Railway	1959	
Higham-on-the-Hill	Ashby and Nuneaton Joint Railway	1931	
Highbridge and Burnham-on-sea (S&D)	Somerset and Dorset Joint Railway	1966	
Highclere	GWR	1960	
Higher Buxton	L&NWR	1951	
Higher Poynton	Great Central and North Staffordshire Joint Railway	1970	
Highfield Road Halt	Great Central Railway	1917	
Highgate	GNR	1954	
Highgate Road High Level	Tottenham and Hampstead Junction Railway	1915	
Highgate Road Low Level	Midland Railway	1918	
Highlandman	Caledonian Railway	1964	
Highley	GWR	1963	reopened by Severn Valley Railway
Hightown Halt	Great Western Railway	1962	
Highworth	GWR	1953	
Hilgay	GER	1963	
Hill End	GNR	1951	
Hillington	Midland and Great Northern Joint Railway	1959	
Hillside (Tayside)	North British Railway	1927	
Hilton House	Lancashire and Yorkshire Railway	1954	
Himley	GWR	1932	
Hinderwell	NER	1958	
Hindley Green	L&NWR	1961	
Hindley South	Great Central Railway	1964	
Hindlow	L&NWR	1954	
Hindolvestone	Midland and Great Northern Joint Railway	1959	
Hinksey Halt	GWR	1915	
Hinton (Worcestershire)	Midland Railway	1963	
Hipperholme	Lancashire and Yorkshire Railway	1953	
Hirwaun	GWR	1964	
Hirwaun Pond Halt	Great Western Railway	1964	
Histon	GER	1970	
Hixon	North Staffordshire Railway	1947	

=== Ho ===
Station (Town, unless in station name)	Rail company	Year closed	Notes
Hockerill Halt	GER	1952	
Hockley (West Midlands)	GWR	1972	
Hodnet	GWR	1963	
Hoe Farm Halt	West Sussex Railway	1935	
Hoghton	Lancashire and Yorkshire Railway	1960	
Hoghton Tower	East Lancashire Railway	1848	
Holbeach	Midland and Great Northern Joint Railway	1959	
Holbeck High Level	GNR	1958	
Holbeck Low Level	Midland Railway/North Eastern Railway Joint	1958	
Holborn Viaduct	London, Chatham and Dover Railway	1990	
Holborn Viaduct Low Level	London, Chatham and Dover Railway	1916	
Holburn Street (Aberdeen)	Great North of Scotland Railway	1937	
Holcombe Brook	Lancashire and Yorkshire Railway	1952	
Hole	Southern Railway	1965	
Holehouse Junction	Glasgow and South Western Railway	1950	
Holkham	GER	1952	
Holland Arms	L&NWR	1952	
Holland Road Halt	London, Brighton and South Coast Railway	1956	
Hollin Well and Annesley	Great Central Railway	1963	
Holloway and Caledonian Road	GNR	1915	
Holly Bush	L&NWR	1960	
Hollybush	Glasgow and South Western Railway	1964	
Hollym Gate	NER	1870	
Holme (Cambridgeshire)	GNR	1959	
Holme (Lancashire)	Lancashire and Yorkshire Railway	1930	
Holme (Norfolk)	East Anglian Railways	1853	
Holme Hale	GER	1964	
Holme Lacy	GWR	1964	
Holme Moor	NER	1954	
Holmes	Midland Railway	1955	
Holmfield	Halifax and Ovenden Junction Railway	1955	
Holmfirth	Lancashire and Yorkshire Railway	1959	
Holmgate	Ashover Light Railway	1936	
Holmsley	London and South Western Railway	1964	
Holsworthy (1st)	London and South Western Railway	1898	
Holsworthy (2nd)	London and South Western Railway	1966	
Holt (Norfolk)	Midland and Great Northern Joint Railway	1964	
Holt Junction	GWR	1966	
Holtby	York and North Midland Railway	1939	
Holton Village Halt	GNR	1961	
Holton-le-Clay	GNR	1955	
Holton-le-Moor	Great Central Railway	1965	
Holyhead Admiralty Pier	L&NWR	1925	
Holywell Junction	L&NWR	1966	
Holywell Town	L&NWR	1954	
Holywell Waterworks Halt	Bluebell Railway	1963	
Holywood (Dumfries)	Glasgow and South Western Railway	1949	
Homersfield	GER	1953	
Honeybourne	Oxford, Worcester and Wolverhampton Railway	1969	reopened 1985
Honing	Midland and Great Northern Joint Railway	1959	
Honington	GNR	1962	
Honor Oak	London, Chatham and Dover Railway	1954	
Hook Norton	GWR	1951	
Hookagate and Redhill	Shropshire and Montgomeryshire Railway	1933	
Hoole	Lancashire and Yorkshire Railway	1964	
Hooley Hill	LNWR	1950	
Hope and Penyfford	L&NWR	1962	
Hope High Level	Great Central Railway	1958	
Hope Low Level	L&NWR	1958	
Hopeman	Highland Railway	1931	
Hopesbrook	GWR	1855	
Hopperton	NER	1958	
Hopton-on-Sea	Norfolk and Suffolk Joint Railway	1970	
Horam	London, Brighton and South Coast Railway	1965	
Horbury and Ossett	Lancashire and Yorkshire Railway	1970	
Horbury Junction	Lancashire and Yorkshire Railway	1927	
Horbury (Millfield Road)	Lancashire and Yorkshire Railway	1961	
Horden	NER	1964	new station opened 2020
Horderley	Bishop's Castle Railway	1935	
Horfield	Great Western Railway	1964	
Horham	Mid-Suffolk Light Railway	1952	
Hornby	Midland Railway	1957	
Horncastle	GNR	1954	
Horninglow	North Staffordshire Railway	1949	
Hornsea Bridge	NER	1964	
Hornsea Town	NER	1964	
Hornsey Road	Tottenham and Hampstead Junction Railway	1943	
Horrabridge	GWR	1962	
Horringford (Isle of Wight)	Isle of Wight Central Railway	1956	
Horsebridge	London and South Western Railway	1964	
Horsehay and Dawley	GWR	1962	
Horsforth Woodside	North Eastern Railway	1864	
Horsmonden	South Eastern Railway	1961	
Horspath Halt (1st)	GWR	1915	
Horspath Halt (2nd)	GWR	1963	
Horsted Keynes	London, Brighton and South Coast Railway	1963	station continued open for Bluebell Railway
Horton Park	GNR	1952	
Horton-in-Ribblesdale	Midland Railway	1970	reopened 1986
Horwich	Lancashire and Yorkshire Railway	1965	
Hothfield Halt	South Eastern Railway (UK)	1959	
Hotwells	Clifton Extension Railway	1921	
Hotwells Halt	Clifton Extension Railway	1922	
Hougham	GNR	1957	
Hounslow Town	District Railway	1909	
House o'Hill Halt	LMSR	1951	
Houston (Crosslee)	Bridge of Weir Railway	1983	
Hovingham Spa	NER	1953	
How Mill	NER	1959	
Howden Clough	GNR	1952	
Howe Bridge	L&NWR	1959	
Hownes Gill	NER	1858	
Howood (Renfrewshire)	Glasgow, Paisley, Kilmarnock and Ayr Railway	1840	
Howsham (Lincs)	Great Central Railway	1965	
Howsham (Yorkshire)	York and North Midland Railway	1849	
Howwood (Renfrewshire)	Glasgow and South Western Railway	1955	reopened 2001
Hoy	Sutherland and Caithness Railway	1965	

=== Hu-Hy ===
Station (Town, unless in station name)	Rail company	Year closed	Notes
Hucknall Byron	Midland Railway	1964	
Hucknall Central	Great Central Railway	1963	
Hucknall Town	GNR	1931	
Hugglescote	Ashby and Nuneaton Joint Railway	1931	
Hulands	North Eastern Railway	1948	approximate date
Hull Botanic Gardens	NER	1964	
Hull Cannon Street	Hull, Barnsley and West Riding Junction Railway	1924	
Hull Manor House Street	Hull and Selby Railway	1854	
Hull Riverside Quay	NER	1938	
Hull Victoria Dock	York and North Midland Railway	1864	
Hullavington	GWR	1961	
Hulme End	North Staffordshire Railway	1934	
Humberstone	GNR	1953	special services continued until 1962
Humberstone Road (Leicester)	Midland Railway	1968	
Humbie	North British Railway	1933	
Humshaugh	North British Railway	1956	
Hundred End	Lancashire and Yorkshire Railway	1962	
Hunnington	Halesowen Joint Railway	1919	special services continued until 1958
Hunslet	Midland Railway	1960	
Hunslet Lane	Midland Railway	1851	
Hunstanton	GER	1969	
Hunston	West Sussex Railway	1935	
Huntingdon East	Great Northern and Great Eastern Joint Railway	1959	
Hunwick	NER	1964	
Hurdlow	L&NWR	1949	
Hurlford	Glasgow, Paisley, Kilmarnock and Ayr Railway	1955	
Hurn	London and South Western Railway	1935	
Hurst Green Halt	London, Brighton and South Coast Railway	1961	
Hurst Lane	Ashover Light Railway	1936	
Hurstbourne	London and South Western Railway	1964	
Hurworth Burn	NER	1931	
Husborne Crawley	L&NWR	1941	
Huskisson	Cheshire Lines Committee	1885	
Huskisson Dock	Liverpool Overhead Railway	1956	
Husthwaite Gate	NER	1953	
Hutcheon Street (Aberdeen)	Great North of Scotland Railway	1937	
Hutton Gate	NER	1964	
Hutton Junction	NER	1891	
Huttons Ambo	NER	1930	
Huyton Quarry	L&NWR	1958	
Hyde Road	Great Central Railway	1958	
Hylton	NER	1964	reopened 2002 by the Tyne and Wear Metro as South Hylton
Hythe (Hampshire)	Southern Railway	1966	
Hythe (Kent)	South Eastern Railway (UK)	1951	

== I ==
=== Ib-Im ===
Station (Town, unless in station name)	Rail company	Year closed	Notes
IBM	British Rail	2018	
Ibrox	Glasgow and Paisley Joint Railway	1967	
Ibrox Football Ground	?	1965	
Icknield Port Road	L&NWR	1931	
Ide Halt	GWR	1958	
Idle	GNR	1931	
Idle	Leeds and Bradford Railway	1848	
Idmiston Halt	Southern Railway	1968	
Idridgehay	Midland Railway	1947	
Iffley Halt	GWR	1915	
Ilderton	NER	1930	
Ilfracombe	London and South Western Railway	1970	
Ilkeston Junction and Cossall	Midland Railway	1967	re-opened as Ilkeston 2017
Ilkeston North	GNR	1964	
Ilkeston Town	Midland Railway	1947	
Ilmer Halt	Great Western and Great Central Joint Railway	1963	
Ilminster	Great Western Railway	1962	
Ilton Halt	Great Western Railway	1962	
Immingham Dock	Great Central Railway	1969	
Immingham Dock (G & I tramway)	Grimsby and Immingham Tramway	1961	
Immingham (Eastern Jetty)	Great Central Railway	1939	
Immingham Halt	Great Central Railway	1912	
Immingham Town	Grimsby and Immingham Tramway	1961	
Immingham Western Jetty	Great Central Railway	1922	
Imperial Cottages Halt	British Railways	1965	

=== In-Iv ===
Station (Town, unless in station name)	Rail company	Year closed	Notes
Inches	Caledonian Railway	1964	
Inchture	Caledonian Railway	1956	
Inchture Village	Caledonian Railway	1917	
Incline Top	Taff Vale Railway	1858	
Ingarsby	GNR	1957	
Ingestre	GNR	1939	
Ingham	GER	1953	
Ingleby	NER	1954	
Ingleton	L&NWR	1917	
Ingleton (1st)	Midland Railway	1861	
Ingleton (2nd)	Midland Railway	1954	
Ingra Tor Halt	Great Western Railway	1956	
Ingrow East	GNR	1955	
Innerleithen	North British Railway	1962	
Innerpeffray	Caledonian Railway	1951	
Innerwick	North British Railway	1951	
Instow	London and South Western Railway	1965	
Inveramsay	Great North of Scotland Railway	1951	
Inverbervie	North British Railway	1951	
Inveresk	North British Railway	1964	
Invergarry	Highland Railway/North British Railway	1933	
Invergloy	Highland Railway/North British Railway	1933	
Inverkeilor	Dundee and Arbroath Railway	1930	
Inverness Harbour	Highland Railway	1867	
Inverugie	Great North of Scotland Railway	1965	
Inworth	GER	1951	
Ipstones	North Staffordshire Railway	1935	
Ipswich Stoke Hill	Eastern Union Railway	1860	
Irchester	Midland Railway	1960	
Irlams o' th' Height	Lancashire and Yorkshire Railway	1956	
Iron Acton	Midland Railway	1944	
Ironbridge and Broseley	Great Western Railway	1963	
Irongray	Glasgow and South Western Railway	1943	
Irthlingborough	LNWR	1964	
Irvine Bank Street	Lanarkshire and Ayrshire Railway	1930	
Isfield	London, Brighton and South Coast Railway	1969	
Isham and Burton Latimer	Midland Railway	1950	
Island Road	Furness Railway	1967	
Isleham	GER	1962	
Islip	L&NWR	1968	reopened 1989
Itchen Abbas	London and South Western Railway	1973	
Ivybridge	Great Western Railway	1959	reopened 1994

== J ==
Station (Town, unless in station name)	Rail company	Year closed	Notes
Jackaments Bridge Halt	Great Western Railway	1948	
Jackfield Halt	Great Western Railway	1963	
Jacksdale	GNR	1963	
Jackson Street	Grimsby and Immingham Tramway	1961	
James Street	Liverpool Overhead Railway	1956	
Jamestown	North British Railway	1954	
Jedburgh	North British Railway	1948	
Jedfoot	North British Railway	1948	
Jersey Marine	Rhondda and Swansea Bay Railway	1933	
Jervaulx	NER	1954	
Jesmond	Blyth and Tyne Railway	1978	
Jessie Road Bridge Halt	Southsea Railway	1914	
Joan Croft Halt	North Eastern Railway	1950s	approximate date
Jock's Lodge	North British Railway	1848	
John O'Gaunt	Great Northern and London and North Western Joint Railway	1953	
Johnshaven	North British Railway	1951	
Johnstone North (1st)	Glasgow and South Western Railway	1905	
Johnstone North (2nd)	Glasgow and South Western Railway	1955	
Johnstown and Hafod	Great Western Railway	1960	
Jolly Sailor	London and Croydon Railway	1859	
Joppa (1st)	North British Railway	1859	
Joppa	North British Railway	1964	
Jordanston Halt	Great Western Railway	1964	
Jordanstone	Caledonian Railway	1951	
Junction Bridge (Edinburgh)	North British Railway	1947	
Junction Road Halt (East Sussex)	Kent and East Sussex Railway	1954	
Junction Road (London)	Tottenham and Hampstead Junction Railway	1943	
Juniper Green	Caledonian Railway	1943	
Justinhaugh	Caledonian Railway	1952	
