= Dairy House railway station =

Former railway station in Northumberland, England

Coordinates: 55.0725°N 1.4982°W

Dairy House was a railway station near Newcastle, England. It was opened in 1851 to serve the Seaton Suice Branch Line but was closed by 1862. The station was served by the Blyth and Tyne Railway.

Preceding station	Historical railways	Following station
Monkseaton; Line open; station closed	Blyth and Tyne Railway	The Avenue; Line and station closed
Seaton Sluice; Line and station closed	Blyth and Tyne Railway	The Avenue; Line and station closed
