= Horbury Millfield Road railway station =

Disused railway station in Horbury, West Yorkshire, England

Coordinates: 53.6559°N 1.5447°W

Horbury Millfield Road

General information
- Location: Horbury, West Yorkshire; England
- Platforms: 2

Other information
- Status: Disused

History
- Original company: London, Midland and Scottish Railway

Key dates
- 11 July 1927: Opened
- 6 November 1961: Closed
Location

Horbury Millfield Road railway station served the village of Horbury, West Yorkshire, England from 1927 to 1961 on the Manchester and Leeds Railway.

== History ==
The station was opened on 11 July 1927 by the London, Midland and Scottish Railway. It replaced Horbury Junction. It was situated opposite St Mary's Church and was closer to Horbury railway works than Horbury Junction. It closed on 6 November 1961.

Preceding station	Historical railways	Following station
Wakefield Kirkgate; Line and station open	London, Midland and Scottish Railway; Manchester and Leeds Railway	Horbury and Ossett; Line open, station closed
