= Hartley railway station =

Disused railway station in New Hartley, Northumberland

Hartley

General information
- Location: New Hartley, Northumberland; England
- Coordinates: 55.0851°N 1.5116°W
- Grid reference: NZ312768
- Platforms: 3

Other information
- Status: Disused

History
- Original company: Blyth and Tyne Railway
- Pre-grouping: North Eastern Railway
- Post-grouping: LNER; British Rail (North Eastern)

Key dates
- 1851: Opened
- 2 November 1964: Closed
Location

Hartley railway station served the villages of New Hartley and Hartley in Northumberland, North East England from 1851 to 1964.

== History ==
The station was opened by the Blyth and Tyne Railway in 1851 to replace the earlier Hartley Pit station, which is thought to have been located approximately 150 yards (140 m) to the south west. It was situated at the junction of the Blyth and Tyne railway main line towards Seghill (which veers off sharply to west) and its Avenue branch line to Monkseaton (which continues due south), north of the level crossing of St Michael's Avenue at the east end of New Hartley Village.

The station had platforms on both lines, with two curved platforms on the main line and a single platform on the down (northbound) track of the Avenue branch. The principal goods handled at the station were gravel and sand; this ceased in December 1963. The station closed to passengers on 2 November 1964.

Preceding station	Disused railways	Following station
Seaton Delaval; Line and station open	Blyth and Tyne Railway	Newsham; Line and station open
The Avenue; Line and station closed	Blyth and Tyne Railway	Newsham; Line and station open
