= Horbury and Ossett railway station =

Disused railway station in West Yorkshire, England

Horbury and Ossett
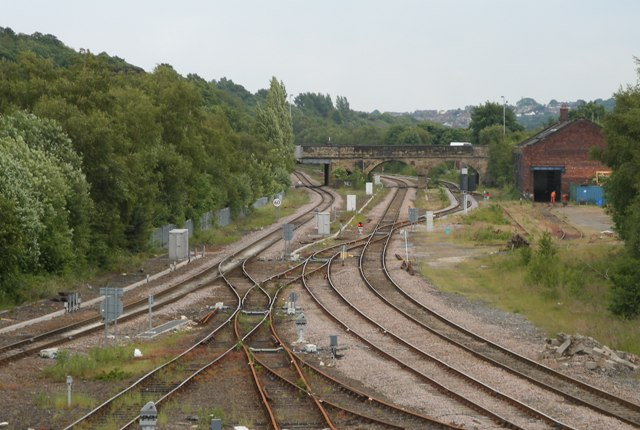
- Site of the former station

General information
- Location: Horbury, City of Wakefield; England
- Coordinates: 53.6588°N 1.5682°W
- Grid reference: SE286181

Other information
- Status: Disused

History
- Original company: Manchester and Leeds Railway
- Pre-grouping: Lancashire and Yorkshire Railway
- Post-grouping: London, Midland and Scottish Railway

Key dates
- 1840: Opened
- 1970: Closed
Location

Horbury and Ossett railway station formerly served the town of Horbury in West Yorkshire, England. It was located on the Manchester and Leeds Railway (later the Lancashire and Yorkshire Railway), which ran along the Calder valley establishing a key link between Liverpool and Manchester to the west, and Leeds, York and Hull to the east. The station was opened with the inauguration of the line in 1840, on the west of the Horbury Bridge Road, to the south-west of the town. Later a new, more substantial structure was built just to the east.

In 1850 the Lancashire and Yorkshire added a new line, from Wakefield to Barnsley, and the town acquired a second station, Horbury Junction, about a mile to the east, where trains from the new Barnsley branch joined the existing line. But it was not as convenient for the centre of the town, so trains on the east–west line continued to stop at the original station instead. A connecting curve to the Barnsley line from the Horbury and Ossett side was added in 1902, completing the triangle; but it attracted little traffic after 1939, and passenger services from the west were suspended in 1962. The chord continued to be used by some freight traffic, and occasionally used for parking the Royal Train, but was eventually severed in 1991. The eastern side of the triangle continues to be used by Hallam Line trains from Leeds to Sheffield. The original Horbury Junction station closed in 1929; although for a time a third station was open, on the main line a little closer to the town, to service the large railway wagon works of Charles Roberts and Co. which grew up in the land between the two lines.

British Railways developed a large marshalling yard in the 1960s at Healey Mills immediately to the west of the original station.

Horbury and Ossett station itself closed in 1970. Almost all that remains is the old subway which ran under the tracks. Ossett is now the largest town in Yorkshire without a railway station. Proposals to open a new one are periodically canvassed, perhaps on part of the Healey Mills site.

A revival movement was started in early 2026 by Charlie Sprott. Detailed in his book: Ossett's Future.

The front cover of the Charlie Sprott book: Ossett's Future. A book about the rail history and future of Ossett, West Yorkshire.

Preceding station	Historical railways	Following station
Thornhill for Dewsbury	L&YR; Calder Valley line	Wakefield Kirkgate
	Disused railways	
n/a	L&YR; Horbury West Curve	Crigglestone West
