= The Avenue railway station =

Short-lived railway station in Seaton Sluice, Northumberland

The Avenue

General information
- Location: Seaton Sluice, Northumberland; England
- Coordinates: 55.079653°N 1.506027°W
- Grid reference: NZ316762
- Platforms: 1

Other information
- Status: Disused

History
- Original company: Blyth and Tyne Railway
- Pre-grouping: North Eastern Railway

Key dates
- 1 April 1861: Opened
- 26 July 1864: Closed
Location

The Avenue railway station served the village of Seaton Sluice, England from 1861 to 1864 on the Blyth and Tyne Railway.

== History ==
The station opened on 1 April 1861 by the Blyth and Tyne Railway. The station was situated at the former level crossing close to the junction with St Michael's Avenue. The original name was apparently Dairy House in the timetable but it was renamed The Avenue some months later. The station was very short lived and the exact closure date is unknown. It closed to passengers on 27 June 1864 but there was still evidence of use on summer Sundays in 1872 and 1874.

Preceding station	Disused railways	Following station
Dairy House; Line and station closed	Blyth and Tyne Railway	Hartley; Line open; station closed
