= Horbury railway works =

Former railway wagon works in West Yorkshire, England

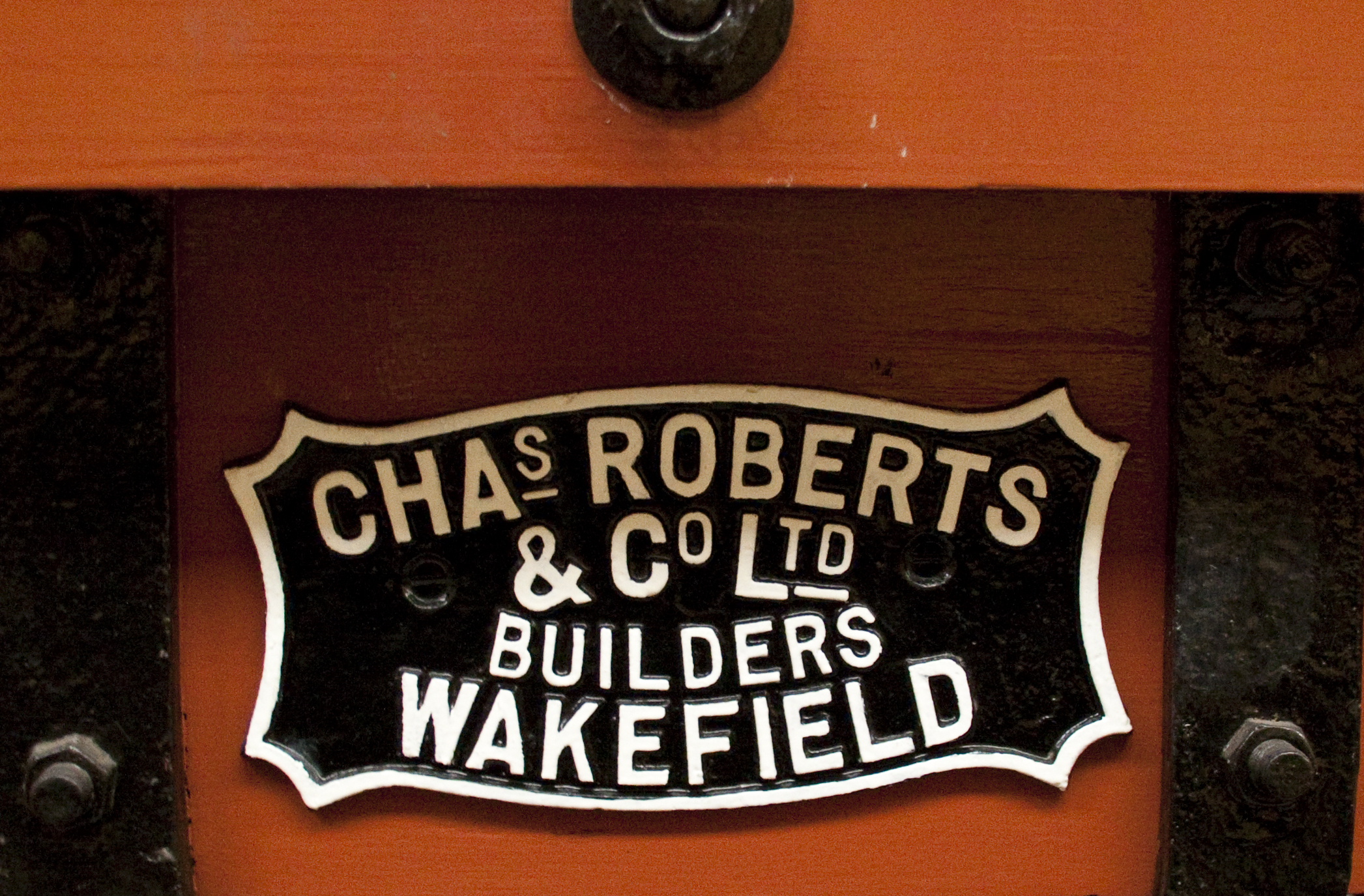
Charles Roberts & Co. builder's plate on preserved wagon

Horbury, near Wakefield, West Yorkshire, England was the site of two wagon works constructed during the Victorian period of industrialisation.

Charles Roberts & Company's wagon works was located at Horbury Junction southeast of Horbury, West Yorkshire, England. It became part of the Procor group in the 1970s as Procor Engineering Ltd. and, subsequently, part of Bombardier Inc.'s European railway businesses in 1990 as Bombardier Prorail (Horbury), closing in 2005.

The Yorkshire Railway Wagon Company was based near Horbury Bridge west of Horbury.

== Yorkshire Railway Wagon Co. ==
Yorkshire Railway Wagon Company
- Industry: Rolling stock manufacture
- Headquarters: Horbury Bridge, England

53.660188°N 1.570015°W

The Yorkshire Railway Wagon Company was incorporated in 1862, by 1869 it had produced over 2000 wagons. The factory was located to the west of Horbury railway station to the north of the Manchester and Leeds Railway line.

The factory closed in the second half of the twentieth century and the site is used as Quarry Hill Industrial Estate.

== Charles Roberts & Co. ==
Charles Roberts & Co. after 1974 Procor Engineering Ltd.
- Industry: Rolling stock
- Fate: closed 2005
- Successor: Bombardier Prorail
- Headquarters: Horbury, Wakefield, England
- Products: Wagons, rail vehicle bodyshells

53.653258°N 1.539872°W

Charles Roberts & Co. Ltd. was established in 1856 in Wakefield and moved to Horbury Junction in 1873 and registered in 1899 as a wagon building business located at the junction of routes of the Manchester and Leeds Railway (present Caldervale Line) and the Sheffield, Rotherham, Barnsley, Wakefield, Huddersfield and Goole Railway Company (leased and later transferred to the Lancashire and Yorkshire Railway) (present Hallam Line).

The company produced a variety of railway wagons, tank wagons and components.

The plant was acquired by Procor of Canada in 1974, becoming Procor Engineering Limited. Procor Engineering Ltd. was acquired by Bombardier Inc. in 1990, after which it became part of Bombardier Prorail. Bombardier closed the plant in 2005, as part of number of closures due to overcapacity throughout Europe and North America in its transportation division.

=== Products ===
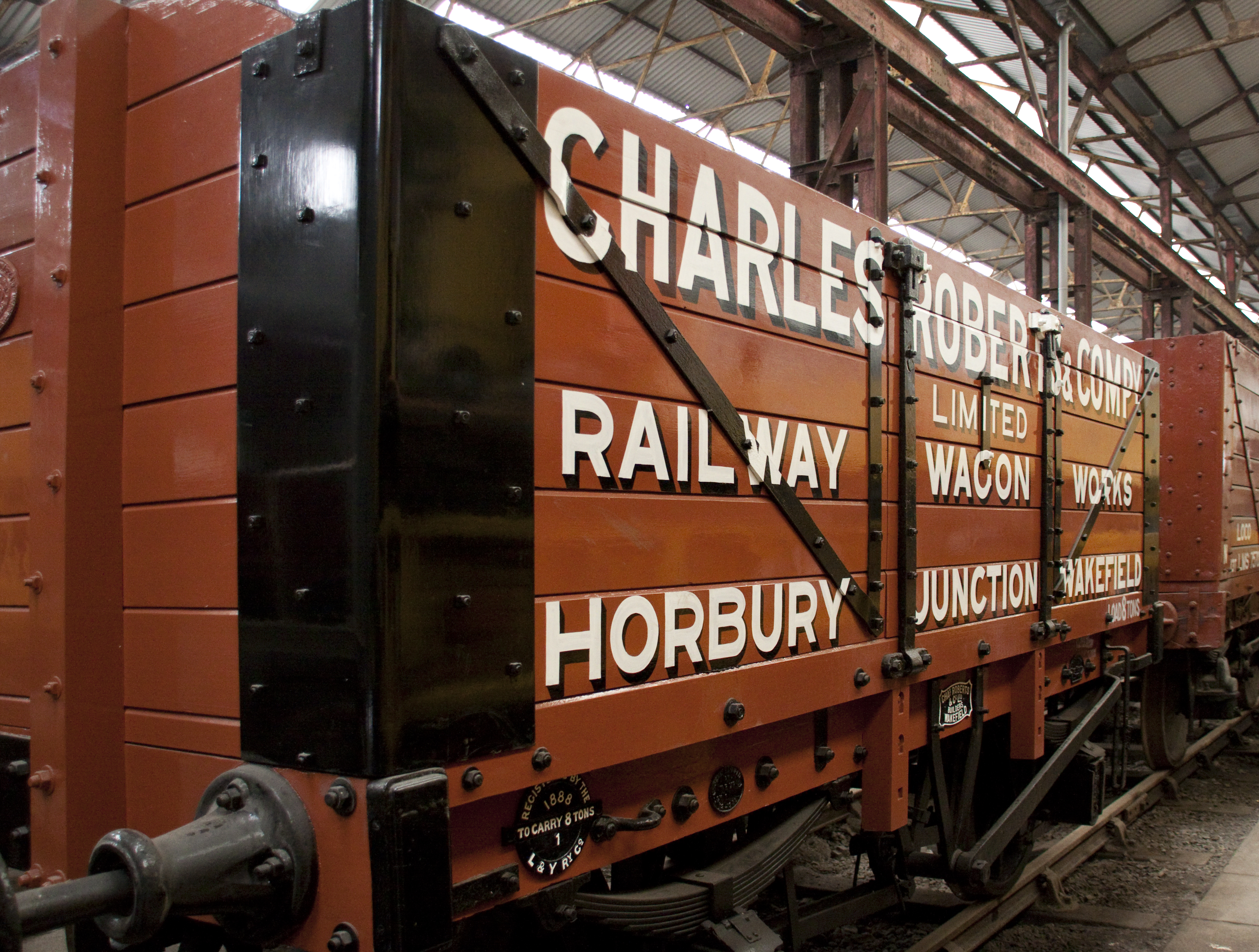
A Charles Roberts & Co. wagon preserved at Swanwick Junction railway station

In addition to freight rolling stock, the plant produced bodyshells for the Class 60 during the Procor period, and Class 92 during Bombardier's ownership. During the Second World War the factory was involved in the production of the Churchill Tank.

The plant was involved in the passenger vehicle construction and refurbishment. In the 1950s tram bodies were constructed for Blackpool Tramways 'Coronation Cars', and Sheffield Tramways. In the early 2000s Bombardier Voyager trains were built at Horbury and at Bombardier's BN plant in Bruges, Belgium. Refurbishment of GNER's Mark 4 coach fleet took place at Horbury in the mid-2000s.

=== After closure ===
After closure part of the plant was taken over by the engineering company Eddison & Wanless, and part of the site has been named the Charles Roberts Office Park.

== See also ==
- Procor
