= Crigglestone West railway station =

Disused railway station in West Yorkshire, England

Crigglestone West
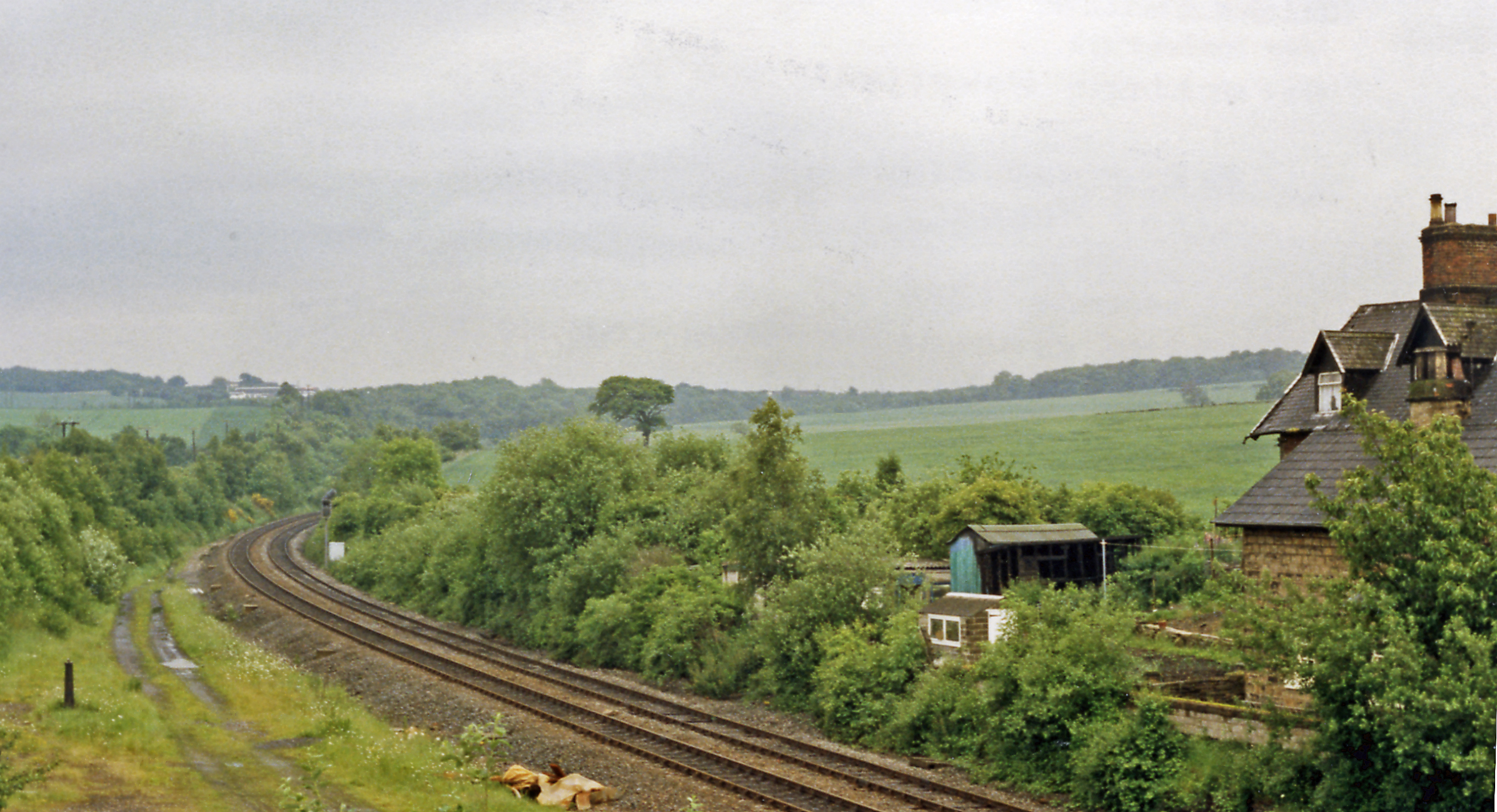
- The site of the station in 1988

General information
- Location: Crigglestone, West Yorkshire; England
- Coordinates: 53.6334°N 1.5448°W
- Grid reference: SE302153
- Platforms: 2

Other information
- Status: Disused

History
- Original company: Lancashire and Yorkshire Railway
- Pre-grouping: Lancashire and Yorkshire Railway
- Post-grouping: London, Midland and Scottish Railway

Key dates
- 1 January 1850: Opened as Crigglestone
- 2 June 1924: Name changed to Crigglestone West
- 12 June 1961: Name changed back to Crigglestone
- 13 September 1965: Closed
Location

Crigglestone West railway station served the village of Crigglestone, West Yorkshire, England from 1850 to 1965 on the Hallam Line.

== History ==
The station opened as Crigglestone on 1 January 1850 by the Lancashire and Yorkshire Railway. The station's name changed to Crigglestone West on 2 June 1924 but was changed back to Crigglestone on 12 June 1961. The station closed to both passengers and goods traffic on 13 September 1965.

Preceding station	Historical railways	Following station
Horbury Junction; Line open, station closed	Lancashire and Yorkshire Railway; Hallam Line	Haigh; Line open, station closed
