= Seaton Sluice railway station =

Former railway station in Northumberland, United Kingdom

Coordinates: 55.0844°N 1.4712°W

Seaton Sluice was a railway station on the wagonway from Hartley Pit at its terminus in the village of Seaton Sluice. The station was served intermittently by passenger trains between 1 May 1851 and April 1853; the wagonway itself was abandoned in the 1860s.

In the 1910s, the North Eastern Railway attempted create a heavy rail link to Seaton Sluice through the construction of the Collywell Bay Branch Line but its construction was halted following the outbreak of the First World War and was never completed.
