= Wentworth railway station =

Disused railway station in South Yorkshire, England

Wentworth
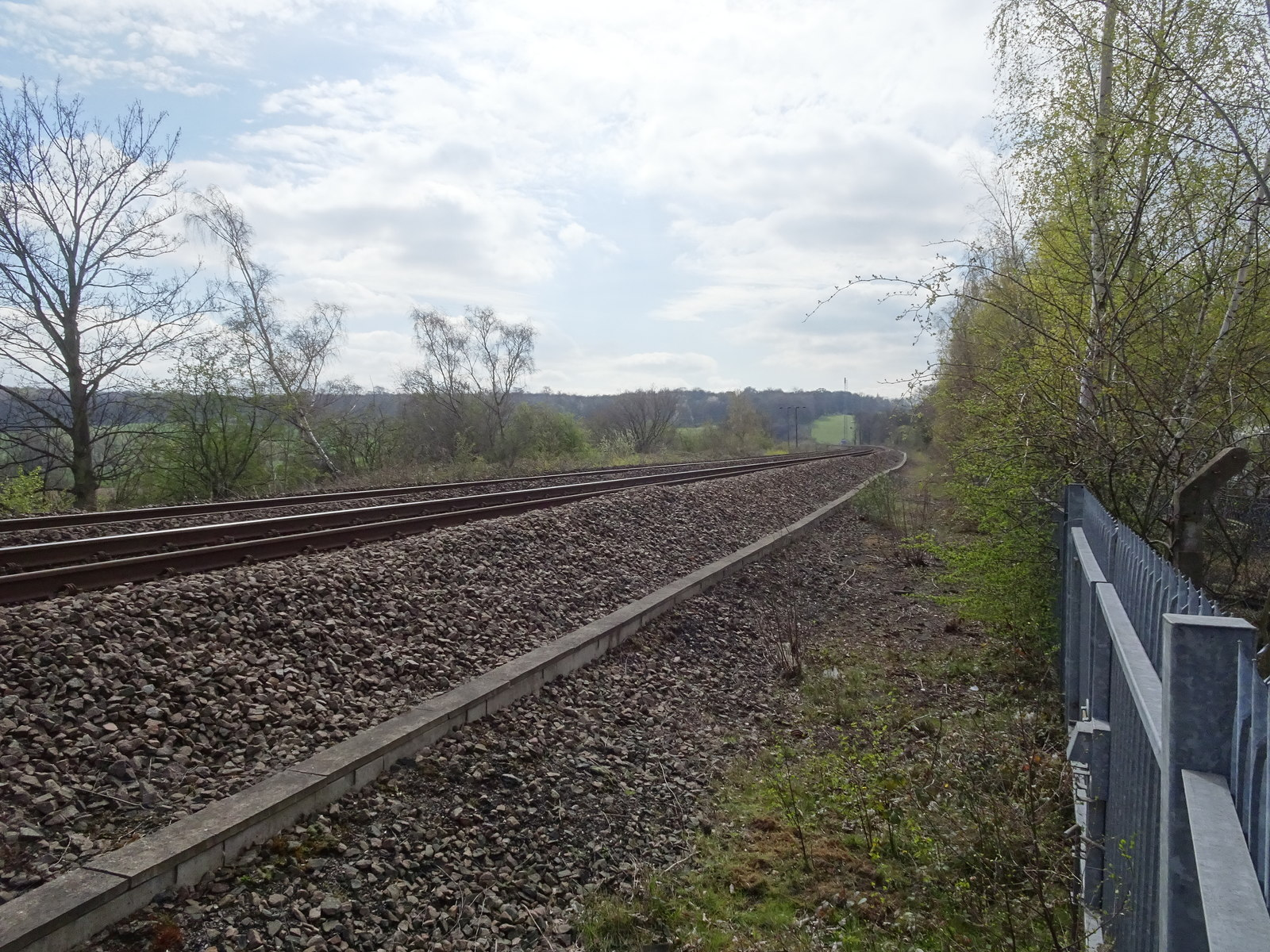
- Site of the former station (2019)

General information
- Location: Wentworth, Barnsley; England
- Coordinates: 53.4848°N 1.4528°W
- Grid reference: SK364988
- Platforms: 2

Other information
- Status: Disused

History
- Original company: Midland Railway
- Pre-grouping: Midland Railway
- Post-grouping: London, Midland and Scottish Railway

Key dates
- 1897: Opened
- 2 November 1959: Closed
Location

Wentworth railway station was a railway station on the Sheffield to Barnsley route of the Midland Railway. The station has been known as Wentworth and Tankersley and Wentworth and Hoyland Common during its life.

== History ==
The station was situated at the north end of the Tankersley Tunnel, adjacent to the road bridge. Built on an embankment, the platforms and the station building were high above the road with the station master's house, which still stands at road level.

The station was some considerable distance from Wentworth, Hoyland Common and Tankersley, and far from walking distance. Its most regular passengers were the miners of Skiers Spring Colliery, situated on the other side of the road bridge, coming on and off shift.

The station closed on 2 November 1959.

== Route ==
Preceding station	Disused railways	Following station
Chapeltown; Line and station open	Midland Railway	Elsecar; Line and station open
