= Haigh railway station =

Disused railway station in West Yorkshire, England

Haigh
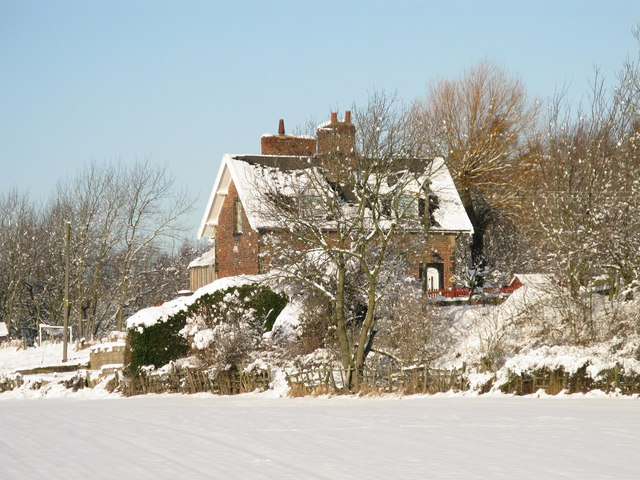
- Former station building (2010)

General information
- Location: Haigh, West Yorkshire; England
- Coordinates: 53.6053°N 1.5481°W
- Grid reference: SE300121
- Platforms: 2

Other information
- Status: Disused

History
- Original company: Lancashire and Yorkshire Railway
- Pre-grouping: Lancashire and Yorkshire Railway
- Post-grouping: London, Midland and Scottish Railway

Key dates
- 1 January 1850: Opened
- 13 September 1965: Closed
Location

Haigh railway station served the village of Haigh, West Yorkshire, England from 1850 to 1965 on the Hallam Line.

== History ==
The station opened on 1 January 1850 by the Lancashire and Yorkshire Railway. It closed to both passengers and goods traffic on 13 September 1965.

Preceding station	Historical railways	Following station
Crigglestone West; Line open, station closed	Lancashire and Yorkshire Railway; Hallam Line	Darton; Line and station open
