= Hillside railway station, NBR =

Disused railway station in Hillside, Angus

Coordinates: 56.7413°N 2.4738°W

Hillside

General information
- Location: Hillside, Angus; Scotland

Other information
- Status: Disused

History
- Original company: North British Railway
- Pre-grouping: North British Railway
- Post-grouping: LNER

Key dates
- 1 May 1883: Opened as Hill Side
- 1910: Name changed to Hillside
- February 1927: Closed
Location

Hillside railway station served the village of Hillside, Angus, Scotland from 1883 to 1927 on the North British, Arbroath and Montrose Railway.

== History ==
The station opened as Hill Side on 1 May 1883 by the Caledonian Railway. The signal box, which opened before the station, opened in 1881. To the northeast is a goods yard, which later became Hillside Distillery. Its name was changed to Hillside in 1910. The station closed in February 1927.

Preceding station	Historical railways	Following station
Terminus	North British, Arbroath and Montrose Railway	Montrose; Line open, station open
