= Seghill railway station =

Disused railway station in Seghill, Northumberland

Seghill

General information
- Location: Seghill, Northumberland; England
- Coordinates: 55.0633°N 1.5427°W
- Grid reference: NZ293744
- Platforms: 1

Other information
- Status: Disused

History
- Original company: Blyth, Seghill and Percy Main Railway
- Pre-grouping: North Eastern Railway
- Post-grouping: LNER; British Rail (North Eastern)

Key dates
- 28 August 1841: Opened
- 2 November 1964: Closed to passengers
- 7 June 1965: Closed completely
Location

Seghill railway station served the village of Seghill, Northumberland, England from 1841 to 1965 on the Blyth and Tyne Railway.

== History ==
The station opened on 28 August 1841 by the Blyth, Seghill and Percy Main Railway. The station was situated on the A190 Station Road, on the south side of the level crossing. The Seghill Colliery was situated to the north, on the second of the third line that branched off the passenger line. The primary goods traffic handled at the station was bricks, clay and ganister; this was ceased on 9 December 1963. The station was closed to passengers on 2 November 1964 27 June 1964 and closed completely on 7 June 1965.

== Reopening proposals ==
There have been proposals to reintroduce passenger services to part of the former Blyth and Tyne Railway system since the 1990s; Denis Murphy, the then Labour MP for Wansbeck, expressed support in the House of Commons in an adjournment debate in April 1999 and again in a debate in January 2007. The Railway Development Society (renamed Railfuture in 2000) also endorsed the proposal in 1998.

Later, in 2009, the Association of Train Operating Companies published a £34 million proposal to restore passenger services from Newcastle to Ashington.

In the early 2010s, Northumberland County Council (NCC) became interested in the reintroduction of passenger services onto remaining freight-only sections of the network. In June 2013 NCC commissioned Network Rail to complete a GRIP 1 study to examine the best options for the scheme. The GRIP 1 study was received by NCC in March 2014 and in June 2015 they initiated a more detailed GRIP 2 Feasibility Study at a cost of £850,000.

The GRIP 2 study, which NCC received in October 2016, confirmed that the reintroduction of a frequent seven-day a week passenger service between Newcastle, Ashington and possibly a new terminus to the east, at Woodhorn, was feasible and could provide economic benefits of £70 million with more than 380,000 people using the line each year by 2034. The study suggested that due to the short distance between the former stations at Seghill and Seaton Delaval only one, rather than both, of them should be reopened. At the time it was suggested that, subject to funding being raised for the £191 million scheme, detailed design work could begin in October 2018 with construction commencing four months later and the first passenger services introduced in 2021 though by October 2018 such works were yet to begin.

After receiving the GRIP 2 study, NCC initially announced that they were preceding with a GRIP 3 Study from Network Rail but such a report was not commissioned at the time. Despite a change in the political leadership of Northumberland County Council following the 2017 local elections the authority continued to work towards the reintroduction of a passenger service onto the line, encouraged by the Department for Transport's November 2017 report, A Strategic Vision for Rail, which named the line as a possible candidate for a future reintroduction of passenger services. Consequentially, NCC commissioned a further interim study in November 2017 (dubbed GRIP 2B) to determine whether high costs and long timescales identified in the GRIP 2 Study could be reduced by reducing the initial scope of the project but the report failed to deliver on this.

Despite this, the county council has continued to develop the project, announcing a further £3.46 million in funding for a further business case and detailed design study (equivalent to GRIP 3) to be completed by the end of 2019. It is envisaged that passenger trains could be introduced as early as 2022. However, the revised proposals, released in July 2019, are reduced in scope from the plan considered in the 2016 GRIP 2 study and proposed 4-phase project to reduce the initial cost of the scheme. Under these plans, the reopening of Seghill station appears to have been dropped in favour of Seaton Delaval station, though even that option was excluded from the initial £90 million phase and being instead proposed as part of Phase 2 of the project. However, in August 2020, it was reported that these four proposed phases might be merged into a single one.

Preceding station	Disused railways	Following station
Backworth (Holywell); Line open; station closed	Blyth and Tyne Railway	Seaton Delaval; Line and station open
