= Hunslet railway station =

Disused railway station in Leeds, England

Hunslet

General information
- Location: Hunslet, City of Leeds; England
- Coordinates: 53°46′44″N 1°32′11″W
- Grid reference: SE306315
- Platforms: 4

Other information
- Status: Disused

History
- Original company: Midland Railway
- Post-grouping: London, Midland & Scottish Railway

Key dates
- 1 April 1850: Opened
- 14 September 1873: Re-located
- 13 June 1960: Closed
Location

Hunslet railway station is a disused station in Leeds, Yorkshire, England. The station was opened by the Midland Railway on 1 April 1850 to serve the suburb of Hunslet.

Originally built with two platforms, an increase in goods traffic between Normanton and Leeds prompted the Midland Railway to double line capacity between the two locations. As part of this development Hunslet station was relocated approximately one-quarter of a mile (0.4 km) north (closer to Leeds) of its original location with the station buildings at street level on Hilledge Road. The new station opened on 14 September 1873 with four platforms.

After the relocation the station remained open until it was closed on 13 June 1960. After closure the station was demolished leaving no trace of its existence.

== Pullman fire ==
In the early hours of 29 October 1882, the overnight sleeper train from St Pancras to Glasgow and Edinburgh was stopped in Hunslet station after fire broke out in one of the Pullman carriages in the train. Four people were known to be in the carriage and three were evacuated safely however the body of the fourth was found in his compartment of the carriage, the body was identified as Dr John Arthur from Aberdeen. At the inquest held in Leeds the following week it was concluded that the fire had accidentally started due to another passenger's reading lamp setting fire to the furnishings of the carriage and that Dr Arthur died from suffocation while in a narcotic stupor.

	Historical railways	
Woodlesford; Line open; station open	Midland Railway	Leeds Wellington Street; Line open; station open
