= Seaton Delaval railway station =

Railway station in Northumberland, England

Seaton Delaval
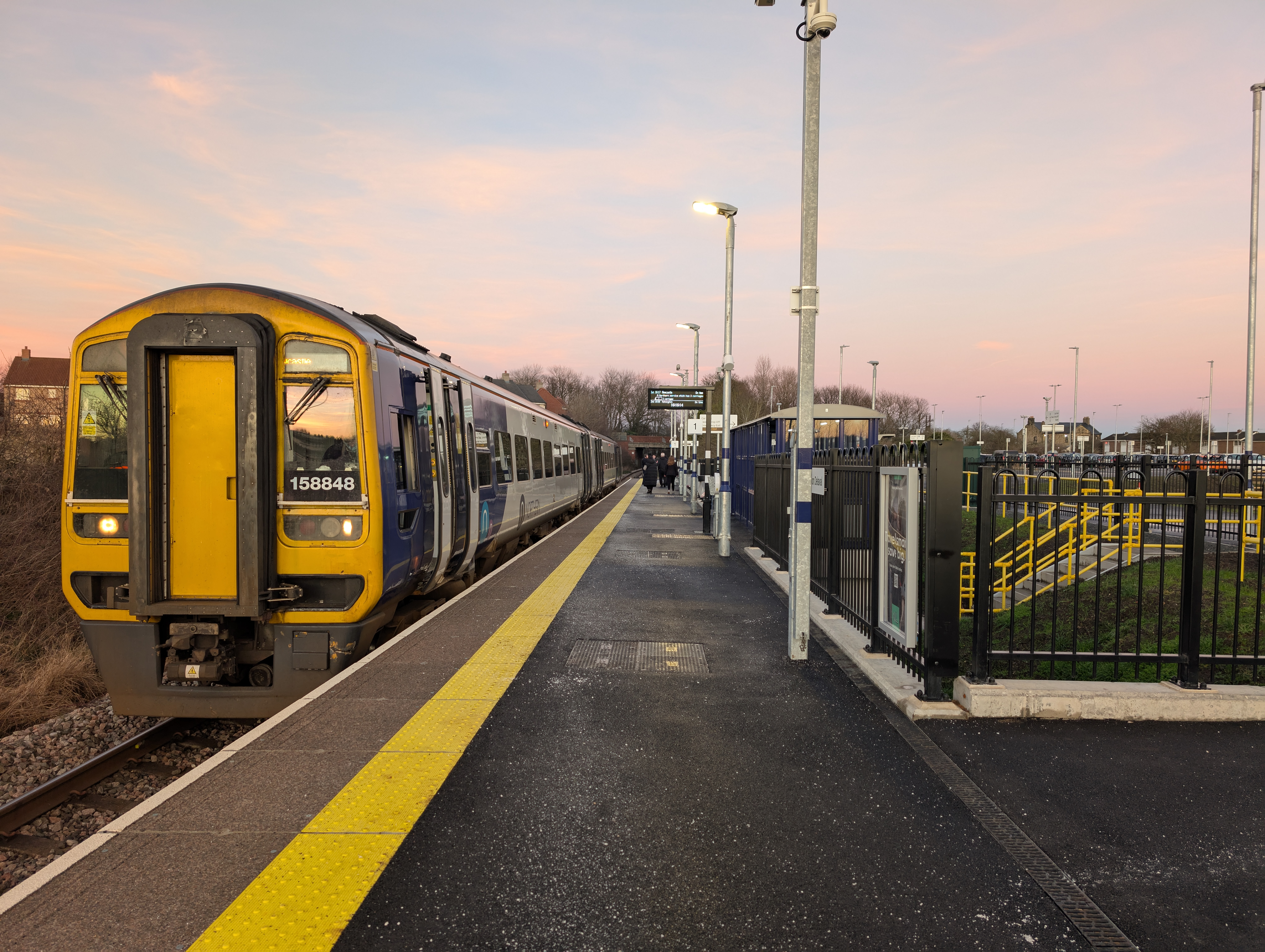
- The station seen in January 2025, with a Class 158 at the platform.

General information
- Location: Seaton Delaval, Northumberland; England
- Coordinates: 55°04′32″N 1°32′14″W
- Grid reference: NZ293744
- Owner: National Rail
- Manager: Northern Trains
- Line: Northumberland Line
- Platforms: 1
- Tracks: 1

Other information
- Station code: SEJ

History
- Original company: Blyth, Seghill and Percy Main Railway
- Pre-grouping: North Eastern Railway
- Post-grouping: London and North Eastern Railway, British Rail (North Eastern)

Key dates
- 28 August 1841: Opened
- 2 November 1964: Closed to passengers
- 7 June 1965: Closed to goods
- 15 December 2024: Reopened

Passengers
- 2024/25: 73,076
- 2025/26: 0.216 million
Location
- Location within Northumberland
Notes
- Passenger statistics from the Office of Rail and Road

Seaton Delaval is a railway station on the Northumberland Line, which runs between Newcastle and Ashington. The station serves the villages of Seaton Delaval and Seghill in Northumberland, England. It is owned by Network Rail and managed by Northern Trains.

== History ==
The station was opened on 28 August 1841 by the Blyth, Seghill and Percy Main Railway, a predecessor of the Blyth and Tyne Railway. The station was situated on the south side of the Station Road (A192) bridge. After the footbridge subsided in 1940 due to a wartime barricade, all of the trains used the down platform. The principal goods traffic was bricks; this ceased in 1963. The station was closed to passengers on 2 November 1964 and closed completely on 7 June 1965.

== Reopening ==
Proposals to reintroduce passenger rail services to the currently freight-only section of the former Blyth and Tyne Railway system have been discussed since the 1990s.

In the early 2010s, Northumberland County Council became interested in the proposals, commissioning Network Rail to complete a GRIP 1 study to examine the best options for the scheme in June 2013. This report was published in March 2014 and was followed in June 2015 with the commissioning of a more detailed GRIP 2 study at a cost of £850,000. The GRIP 2 study, published in October 2016, confirmed that the reintroduction of a frequent seven-day a week passenger service between Newcastle, Ashington and possibly a new terminus to the east, at Woodhorn, was feasible and could provide economic benefits of £70 million with more than 380,000 people using the line each year by 2034. The study suggested that due to the short distance between the former stations at Seaton Delaval and Seghill only one, rather than both, should be reopened.

Despite a change in the political leadership of Northumberland County Council following the 2017 local elections the authority continued to develop the project, encouraged by the Department for Transport's November 2017 report, A Strategic Vision for Rail, which named the line as a possible candidate for a future reintroduction of passenger services. Consequentially, NCC commissioned a further interim study in November 2017 (dubbed GRIP 2B) to determine whether high costs and long timescales identified in the GRIP 2 Study could be reduced by reducing the initial scope of the project, but the report failed to deliver on this.

Nonetheless, the county council has continued to develop the project, hiring AECOM and SCL Rail as contractors to develop the scheme on their behalf in 2018 and allocating an additional £3.46 million in funding for a further business case and detailed design study (equivalent to GRIP 3) in February 2019. Revised plans were revealed in July 2019 which were reduced in scope from the 2016 GRIP 2 study and proposed 4-phase project to reduce the initial cost of the scheme. The revised plans appear to suggest that Seaton Delaval, rather than Seghill, had been selected for reopening but, even on its own, Seaton Delaval was to be excluded from the initial £90 million phase and was only to be reopened during Phase 2 of the project. In Phase 4 it was proposed to add a passing loop in the vicinity of the station to enable the introduction of a half-hourly passenger train service. However, in August 2020, it was reported that these four proposed phases might be merged into a single one.

The North East Joint Transport Committee's bid for £377 million of funding from the UK Government's £1.28 billion Transforming Cities Fund, submitted on 20 June 2019, includes £99 million to fund the reintroduction of passenger services between Newcastle and Ashington,

The main construction phase began in autumn 2022, with the line (partially) and station reopening on 15 December 2024. Services are expected to call additionally at Bedlington from 29 March 2026.

== Services ==
As of December 2024, weekday and Saturday daytime services operate twice-hourly, with an hourly service during the evening and on Sunday. The end-to-end journey time between Newcastle and Ashington is around 35–40 minutes. All services are operated by Northern Trains.

Preceding station	National Rail	Following station
Northumberland Park	Northern Trains; Northumberland Line	Newsham
	Historical railways	
Seghill; Line open; station closed	Blyth and Tyne Railway	Hartley Pit; Line open; station closed
