= Ironbridge and Broseley railway station =

Former railway station in Shropshire, England

Ironbridge and Broseley
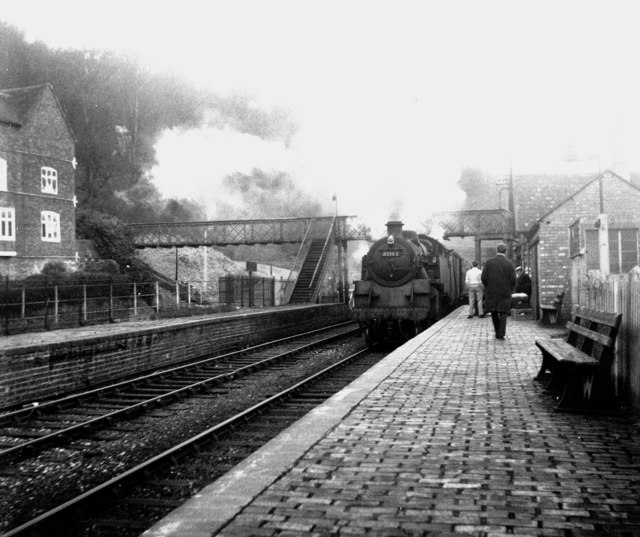
- The station in 1963

General information
- Location: Ironbridge, Telford and Wrekin; England
- Coordinates: 52.6270°N 2.4847°W
- Grid reference: SJ672033
- Platforms: 2

Other information
- Status: Disused

History
- Original company: Severn Valley Railway
- Pre-grouping: Great Western Railway
- Post-grouping: Great Western Railway

Key dates
- 1 February 1862: Station opened as Ironbridge and Broseley
- 9 November 1895: Renamed Iron Bridge and Broseley
- 9 September 1963: Station closed
Location

Ironbridge and Broseley railway station was a stop on the Severn Valley Railway Line; it served the town of Broseley and village of Ironbridge in Shropshire, England.

== History ==
The station was opened in 1862, on a section of the Severn Valley Line, north of Bridgnorth. The signal box controlled railway traffic around the station and the level crossing that lead to the Iron Bridge.

Photographs of the station running-in board show the station name as IRON-BRIDGE & BROSELEY (with hyphen). The cast iron nameplate on the signal box read IRON BRIDGE & BROSELEY SIGNAL BOX ('Iron' and 'Bridge' being separate words, without the hyphen).

Prior to its closure, rationalisation took place in the form of closure of the signal box on 25 November 1956, removal of the upper portion and relocation of the token instruments to the Station Master's office in the main station building.

The station was closed in 1963. Although thought by some people to have been closed as part of the Beeching axe, its planned closure pre-dated his report.

The station was demolished in 1966 to provide car parking space within the Severn Gorge.

== The site today ==
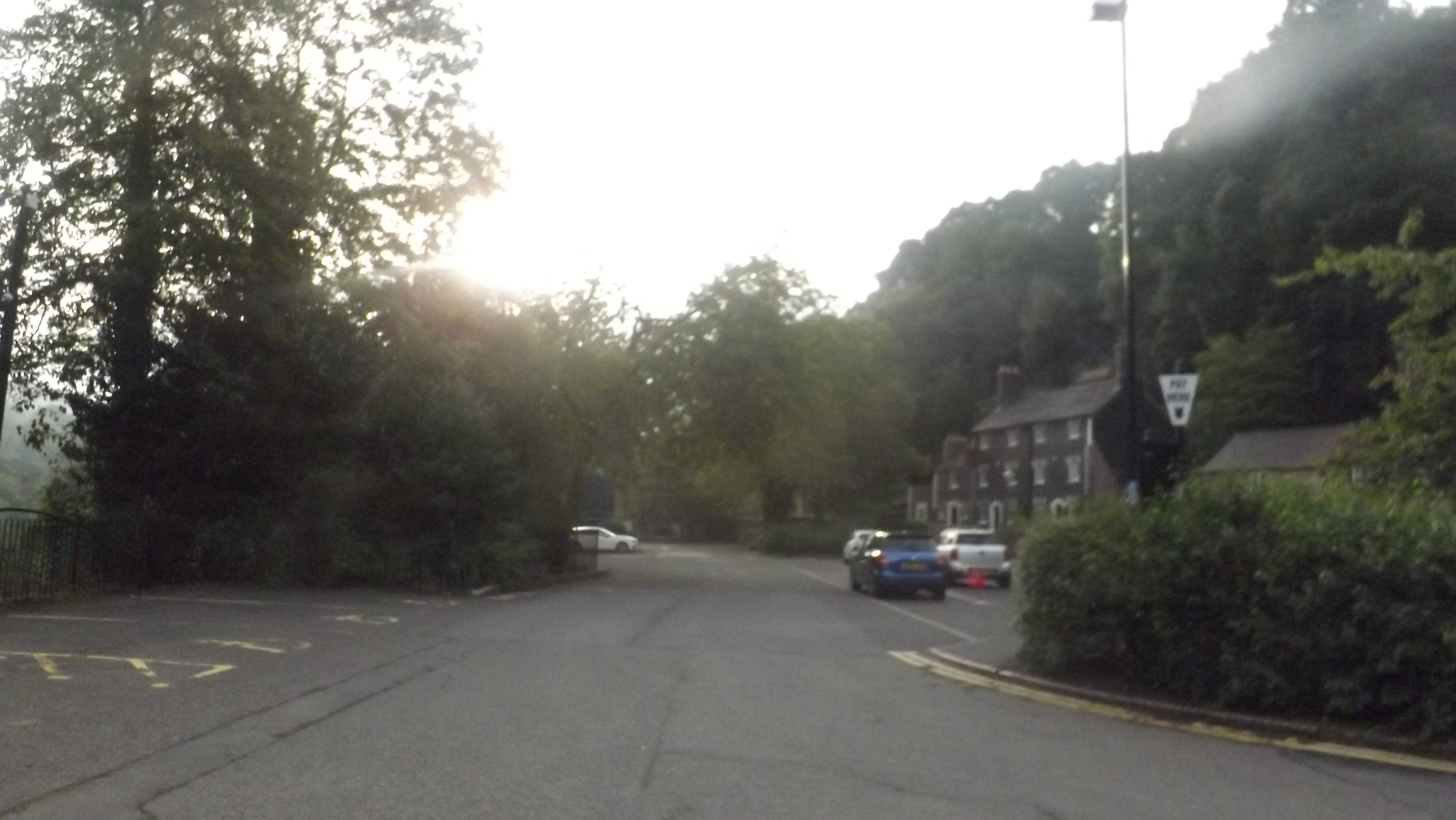
Site of Ironbridge and Broseley station in 2018, now a car park

Virtually all traces of the platforms, station building and goods shed have been swept away. A pay and display car park now occupies the site. There is also little or no trace of the signal box; an electricity supply transformer now stands in its former position.

=== Surviving artifacts ===
The astute observer can find those few traces of the site's former railway use. Two cast iron GWR ball top gate posts and one level crossing gate post survive along with rails in the roadway approaching the Ironbridge toll house. On the opposite side of the road, an abutment of the footbridge visible in the accompanying photograph remains.

Preceding station	Disused railways	Following station
Buildwas; Line and station closed	Great Western Railway; Severn Valley Railway	Jackfield Halt; Line and station closed
