= Jackfield Halt railway station =

Railway station in Shropshire, England

Jackfield Halt
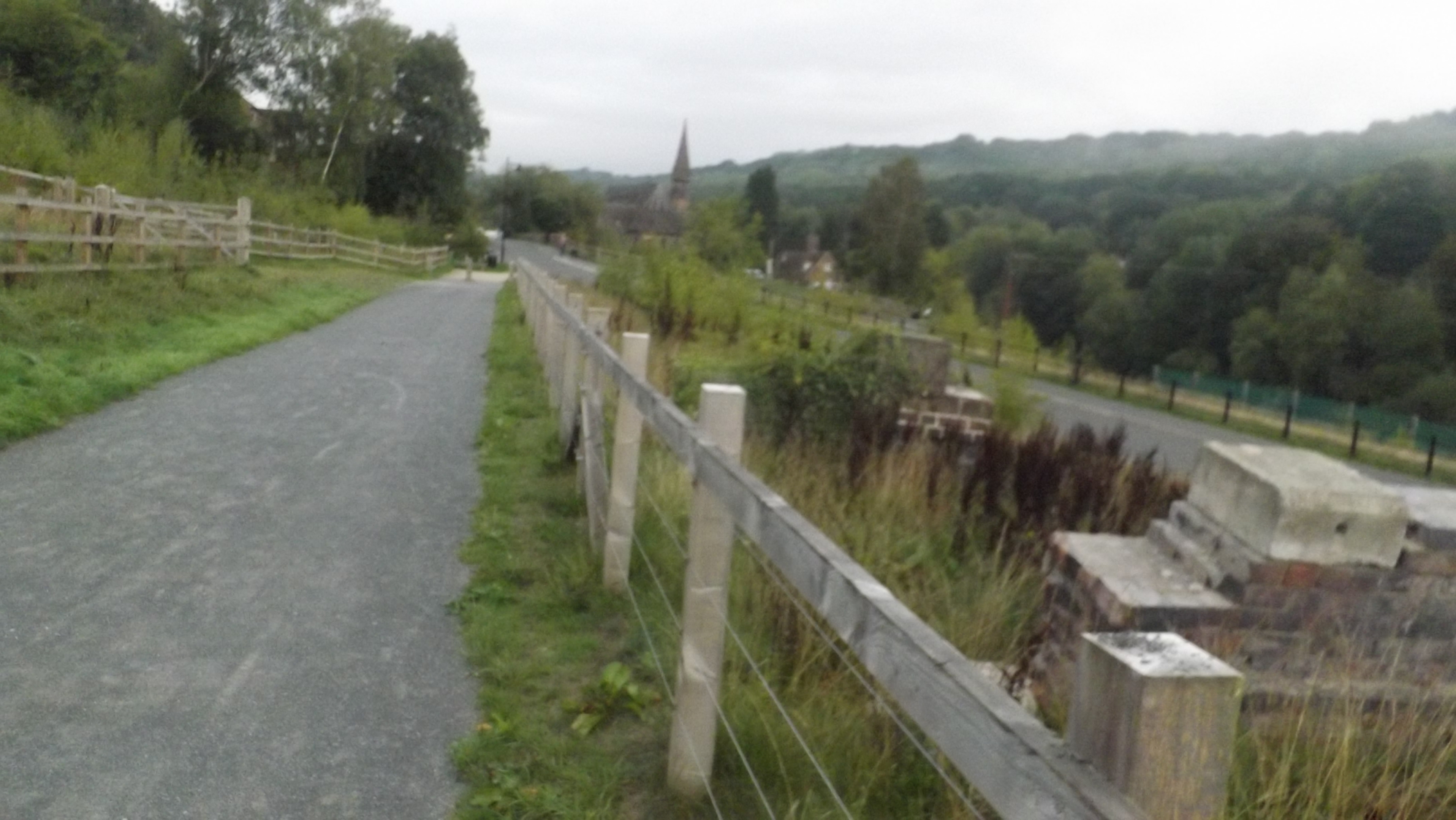

General information
- Location: Jackfield, Telford and Wrekin; England
- Coordinates: 52.6221°N 2.4604°W
- Grid reference: SJ692025
- Platforms: 1

Other information
- Status: Disused

History
- Original company: Great Western Railway
- Post-grouping: Great Western Railway

Key dates
- 3 December 1934: Station opened
- 1 March 1954: Station resited
- 9 September 1963: Station closed
Location

Jackfield Halt was an unstaffed request stop on the Severn Valley line in Shropshire, England. Originally opened at Jackfield, west of Maw and Company's private sidings in 1934, it comprised a simple wooden platform and shelter.

In 1952 the area suffered a severe landslide, during which the line and halt moved around 25 feet (7.6 m) towards the river. The halt was relocated by around ¼ mile to a new position east of these sidings, reopening on 1 March 1954.

The planned closure of the northern end of the Severn Valley Line including Jackfield Halt pre-dated the Beeching report. The re-located halt was demolished shortly after closure and no remains are now visible. The trackbed in the area forms part of National Cycle Route 45, named the Mercian Way.

In late 2013 Telford and Wrekin Council confirmed that government funding had been granted to carry out a land stabilisation scheme in the locality of the former halt. The main works for this were completed in October 2016.

Jackfield Sidings were situated ½ mile closer to Ironbridge. A set of level crossing gates in the centre of these sidings is still in situ, together with three short lengths of track side by side just forward of the crossing gates. What appears to be a platform at that location formed part of these sidings but was not associated with either of the passenger halts.

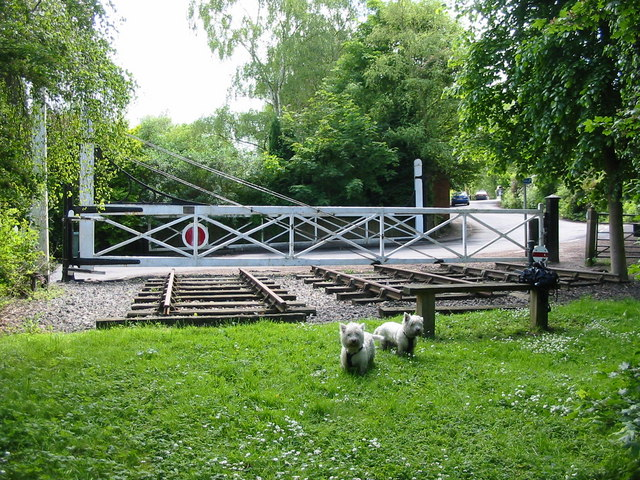
Preserved level crossing gates and railway track at the former Jackfield sidings

Preceding station	Disused railways	Following station
Ironbridge and Broseley; Line and station closed	Great Western Railway; Severn Valley Railway	Coalport West; Line and station closed
