= High Shields railway station =

Disused railway station in High Shields, South Tyneside

High Shields

General information
- Location: High Shields, South Tyneside; England
- Coordinates: 54.9907°N 1.4403°W
- Grid reference: NZ359663
- Platforms: 2

Other information
- Status: Disused

History
- Original company: Brandling Junction Railway Company
- Pre-grouping: North Eastern Railway
- Post-grouping: London and North Eastern Railway

Key dates
- 19 June 1839: Opened as South Shields
- 17 December 1842: Resited and opened as High Shields
- 1879: Resited again
- 1 June 1981: Closed
Location

High Shields railway station served the suburb of High Shields, South Tyneside, England, from 1842 to 1981 on the Brandling Junction Railway.

== History ==
The station was opened as South Shields on 19 June 1839 by the Brandling Junction Railway Company. Despite its name, it was actually in High Shields. It was known as Market Place in the local newspaper. It was resited to the north on 17 December 1842. The new site was known as the 'Station at Grewcock's corner' in the notice upon opening.

It was resited in 1879 and closed on 1 June 1981, when the South Shields branch line was closed for conversion to a Tyne and Wear Metro route. The new Metro line however used the former Stanhope and Tyne Railway alignment to reach the town centre, instead of the former B.J.R route, reflecting the gradual movement of the population away from the river over the previous century, so the station was not reopened for Metro services when they began in March 1984.

The track was subsequently lifted, with the station platforms and buildings demolished - no trace now remains, as the location has been cleared and landscaped.

Preceding station	Disused railways	Following station
Brockley Whins; Line closed, station open	Brandling Junction Railway Company	Terminus
