= Hownes Gill railway station =

Short-lived railway station in Consett, County Durham

Hownes Gill

General information
- Location: Consett, County Durham; England
- Coordinates: 54.8354°N 1.8504°W
- Grid reference: NZ097489

Other information
- Status: Disused

History
- Original company: Stockton and Darlington Railway
- Pre-grouping: North Eastern Railway
- Post-grouping: London and North Eastern Railway

Key dates
- 1 September 1845: Opened
- 31 October 1845: Closed
- 1 April 1846: Reopened
- 1846: Closed again
- January 1857: Reopened again
- 1 July 1858: Closed permanently
Location

Hownes Gill railway station served the town of Consett, County Durham, England, from 1845 to 1858 on the Stanhope and Tyne Railway.

== History ==
The station was opened on 1 September 1845 by the Stockton and Darlington Railway. It was known as Howens Gill in the early versions of Bradshaw. It was situated on the edge of a ravine, which meant that goods traffic had to be hauled up or down an incline if they wanted to go further. A bridge was later built across the ravine. The station closed on 31 October 1845, reopened on 1 April 1846, closed again in later 1846 but reopened again in January 1857, only to close permanently on 1 July 1858. It was in the handbook of stations in 1867, although it would have been an error.

Preceding station	Disused railways	Following station
Rowley; Line and station closed	Stockton and Darlington Railway; Stanhope and Tyne Railway	Durham Turnpike; Line and station closed
