= Inverugie railway station =

Disused railway station in Inverugie, Aberdeenshire

Coordinates: 57.5169°N 1.8390°W

Inverugie
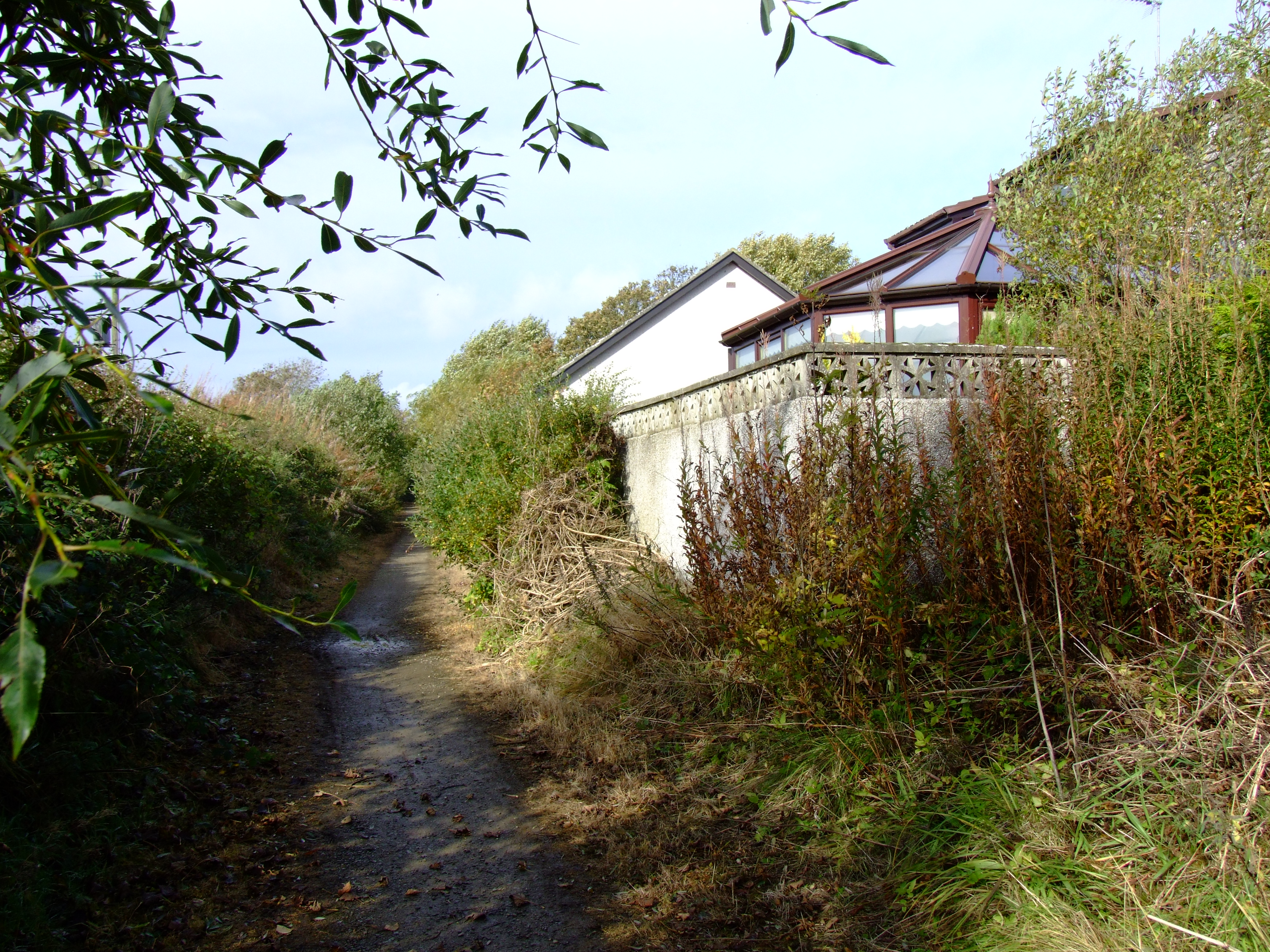

General information
- Location: Inverugie, Aberdeenshire; Scotland
- Platforms: 1

Other information
- Status: Disused

History
- Original company: Formartine and Buchan Railway
- Pre-grouping: Great North of Scotland Railway
- Post-grouping: London and North Eastern Railway

Key dates
- 3 July 1862: Opened
- 3 May 1965: Closed
Location

Inverugie railway station was a railway station in Inverugie, Aberdeenshire.

== History ==
The station was opened on 3 July 1862 by the Formartine and Buchan Railway. On the north side was a siding and to the east was the signal box, which opened in 1894. It was closed to passengers under the Beeching Axe on 3 May 1965.

Preceding station	Disused railways	Following station
Newseat; Line and station closed	Great North of Scotland Railway; Formartine and Buchan Railway	Peterhead; Line and station closed
