= Joppa railway station, E&DR =

Disused railway station in Joppa, Edinburgh

Joppa

General information
- Location: Joppa, Edinburgh; Scotland
- Coordinates: 55.9442°N 3.1018°W
- Grid reference: NT312729

Other information
- Status: Disused

History
- Original company: North British Railway
- Pre-grouping: North British Railway

Key dates
- 16 July 1847: Opened
- 16 May 1859: Closed
Location

Joppa railway station served the suburb of Joppa, Edinburgh, Scotland, from 1847 to 1859 on the Edinburgh and Dalkeith Railway.

== History ==
The station was opened on 16 July 1847 by the North British Railway, although it didn't appear in any publications until Topham's Patented Railway Timetables in May 1848. It closed on 16 May 1859, being replaced by Joppa on the North British Railway main line.

Preceding station	Disused railways	Following station
Portobello (E&DR); Line and station closed	North British Railway; Edinburgh and Dalkeith Railway	Niddrie; Line open, station closed
