= Heaton Lodge railway station =

Short-lived railway station in Batley, West Yorkshire

Coordinates: 53.679°N 1.718°W

Heaton Lodge

General information
- Location: Bradley, West Riding of Yorkshire; England

Other information
- Status: Disused

History
- Original company: Lancashire and Yorkshire Railway
- Pre-grouping: Lancashire and Yorkshire Railway

Key dates
- 2 August 1847: Opened
- 1 November 1864: Closed
Location

Heaton Lodge railway station co-served the suburb of Bradley, Huddersfield, in the historical county of West Riding of Yorkshire, England, from 1847 to 1864 on the Leeds, Dewsbury and Manchester Railway.

== History ==
The station was opened on 2 August 1847 by the Lancashire and Yorkshire Railway. It was known as Heaton Lodge Junction in Bradshaw until 1849. It was a short-lived station, closing on 1 November 1864.

Preceding station	Disused railways	Following station
Bradley; Line open, station closed	Lancashire and Yorkshire Railway; Leeds, Dewsbury and Manchester Railway	Mirfield; Line and station open
