= Horbury Junction railway station =

Disused railway station in West Yorkshire, England

Horbury Junction
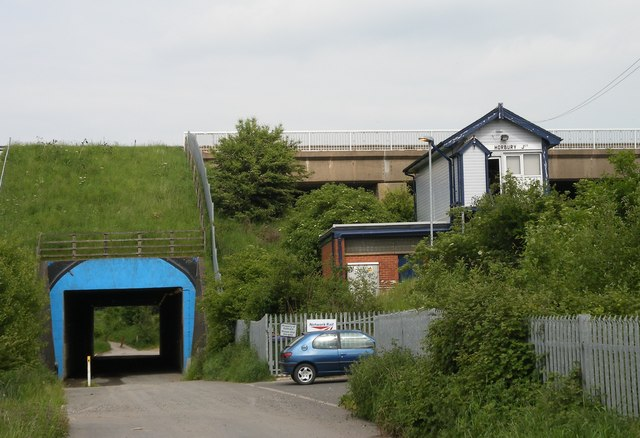
- Signal box (2008)

General information
- Location: Horbury, West Yorkshire; England
- Coordinates: 53.6595°N 1.5324°W
- Grid reference: SE310182
- Platforms: 2

Other information
- Status: Disused

History
- Original company: Lancashire and Yorkshire Railway
- Pre-grouping: Lancashire and Yorkshire Railway
- Post-grouping: London, Midland and Scottish Railway

Key dates
- 1 January 1850: Opened
- 11 July 1927: Closed
Location

Horbury Junction railway station served the village of Horbury, West Yorkshire, England from 1850 to 1927 on the Hallam Line.

== History ==
The station opened on 1 January 1850 by the Lancashire and Yorkshire Railway. The station was situated at the bottom of Green Lane, where the M1 motorway now crosses the valley on a bridge. The station was replaced by Horbury Millfield Road station and closed completely on 11 July 1927.

Preceding station	Historical railways	Following station
Wakefield Kirkgate	Lancashire and Yorkshire Railway; Hallam Line	Crigglestone West; Line open, station closed
