= Hallam Line =

Railway line in Yorkshire, England

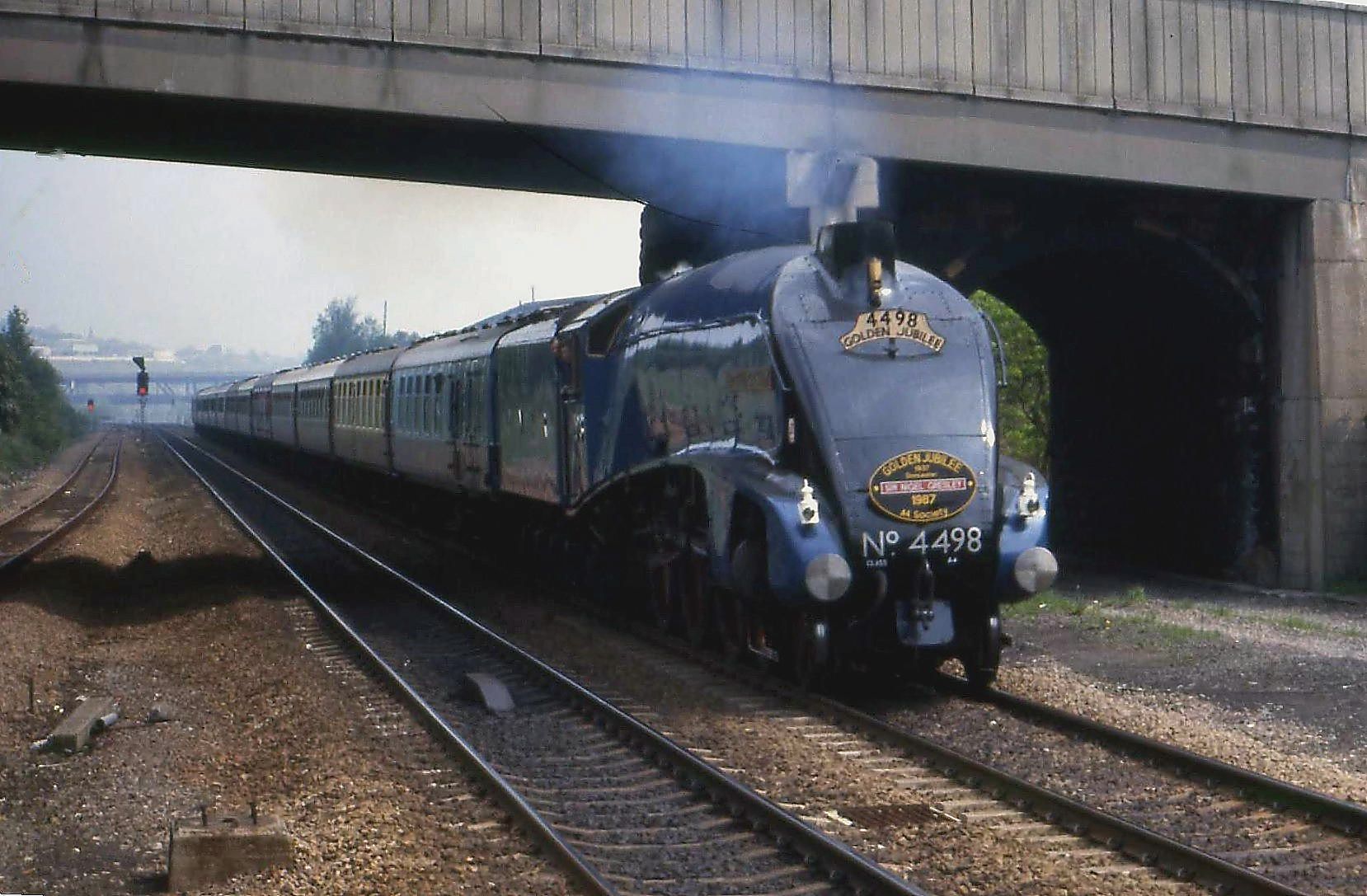
- LNER Class A4 4498 Sir Nigel Gresley passing the former Brightside station

Overview
- Owner: Network Rail
- Locale: West Yorkshire; South Yorkshire
- Termini: Leeds; Sheffield

Technical
- Track gauge: 4 ft 8 1/2 in (1,435 mm) standard gauge
Route map
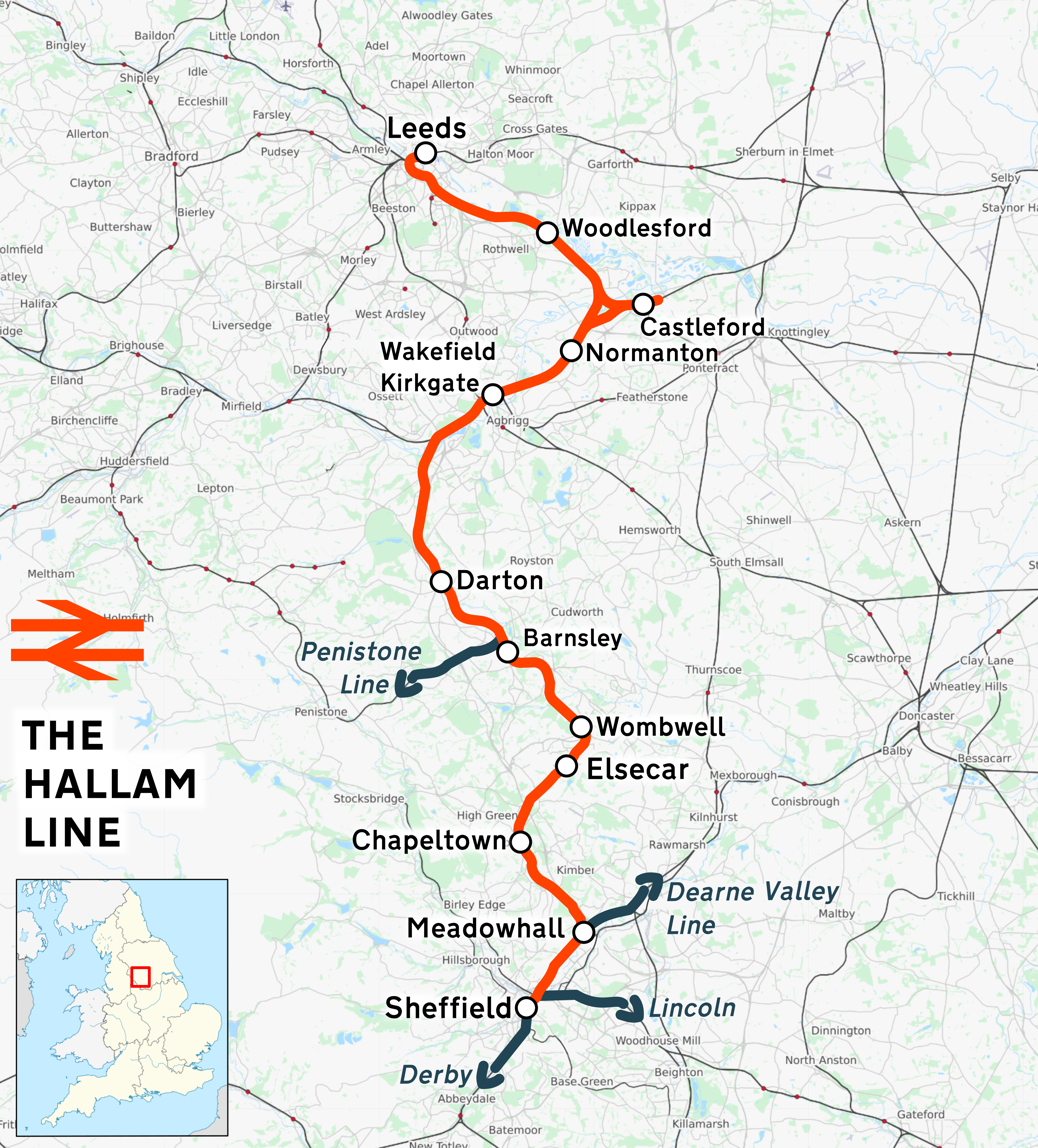
(Click to expand)

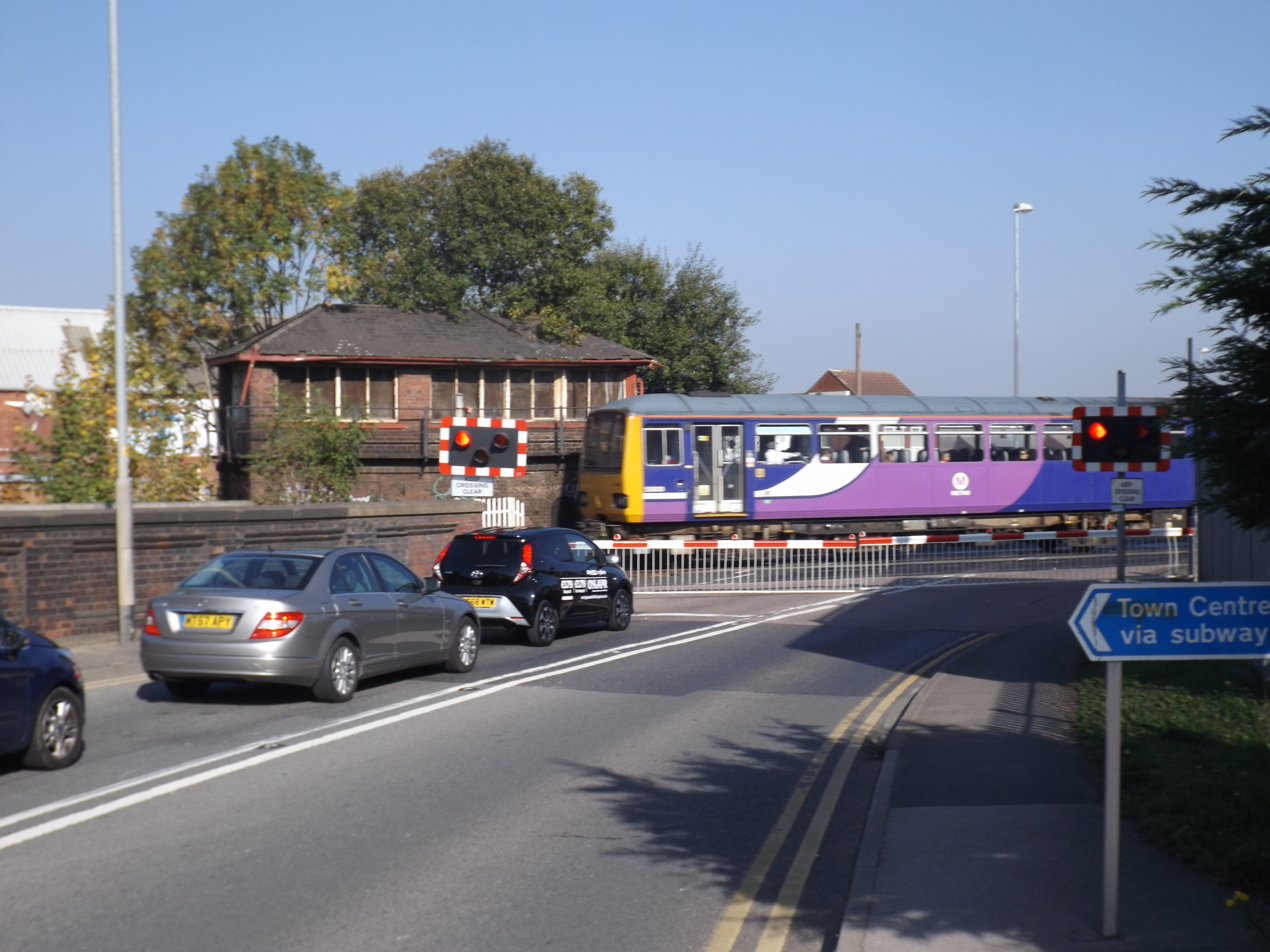
Albion Street level crossing in Castleford

The Hallam Line is a railway connecting Leeds and Sheffield via Castleford in the West Yorkshire Metro area of northern England. It is a slower route from Leeds to Sheffield than the Wakefield line. Services on this line are operated by Northern Trains. Services from Leeds to Nottingham also use the line.

West Yorkshire MetroCards are available on trains between Leeds and Darton, north of Barnsley and South Yorkshire Travelmaster tickets are available in the South Yorkshire area.

== Origin of name ==
The line is named after the manor of Hallam which included Sheffield at the time of the Domesday Book (1086). At this time the local area was known as Hallamshire—the names Hallam and Hallamshire are still used today by many local companies and organisations.

== History ==
Before the 1923 grouping the route followed by the line was owned as follows:

- Leeds–Methley: Midland Railway
- Methley–Normanton: Midland Railway
- Methley–Castleford–Normanton: North Eastern Railway

(alternate route since 1988)

- Normanton–Barnsley: Lancashire and Yorkshire Railway
- Barnsley, Jumble Lane to Quarry Junction: Great Central Railway
- Barnsley, Quarry Junction to Sheffield: Midland Railway

After 1921, the entire route, except Methley to Normanton via Castleford, and the short stretch from Barnsley (Jumble Lane) to Quarry Junction, became part of the London, Midland and Scottish Railway until nationalisation in 1948. Midland Railway trains made use of Barnsley Court House station to avoid contact with Great Central or LNER rails.

The route that now exists as the Hallam Line was not possible until 1960 when BR added a connection at Barnsley (Quarry Junction) to allow trains to use Exchange station and reach the Midland line to Sheffield.

== Route details ==
Trains on the line serve the following places; some stations may no longer be open:

- Leeds railway station: in MR days trains would have operated from Wellington station. Here there is a triangular junction with the line to Bradford. The line from here to Castleford is also served by Pontefract Line services.
- Hunslet (Closed)
- here was the junction with the East & West Yorkshire Union Railway (MidR/Great Northern Railway (GNR) joint: it was a direct connection to Wakefield via Rothwell
- Woodlesford
- Methley: station closed
- between here and Castleford there were several junctions: with the Methley Joint Railway (GNR/L&YR/North Eastern Railway (NER); with the NER line Leeds to York; and with the Swinton & Knottingley Railway to Pontefract
- Either goes to a branch towards Castleford where it then reverses towards Normanton which stopping trains use or alternatively goes a more direct route bypassing Castleford and past the former Altofts railway station which closed in 1990 towards Normanton station that Leeds–Sheffield fast trains use.
- Normanton
- here the MidR main line to Sheffield branched off: our route now uses the L&YR metals
- Wakefield Kirkgate (Also served by the Pontefract and Huddersfield lines)
- Horbury Junction (closed) for the L&YR main line to Manchester
- Crigglestone (Closed)
- A pair of parallel single-track tunnels, Woolley Tunnels (1745 yd; 1570 m), which take the line directly under Woolley Edge services, a motorway service station on the M1 motorway, and under the motorway itself
- Haigh (Closed)
- Darton
- here was Silkstone Junction for the freight line to Silkstone.
- Barnsley: formerly Barnsley Exchange, traffic arrived not only from Leeds but via the Great Central Railway line from Penistone. This is nowadays known as the Penistone Line.

Stations from here to Sheffield are also on the Penistone line:

- Swaithe Viaduct – carries the line over the Worsborough Branch of the Great Central.
- Wombwell
- Elsecar was Elsecar & Hoyland
- Wentworth – also known as Wentworth & Hoyland Common and Wentworth & Tankersley. (Closed)
- Chapeltown: formerly Chapeltown South to distinguish from Chapeltown Central on the former South Yorkshire Railway, later G.C.R. line. Chapeltown station was rebuilt nearer to the town centre roundabout in the 1970s as the first railway project of the, then, new South Yorkshire Passenger Transport Authority. Much of the original remains.

From here the two railways – MidR and GCR had parallel lines to Sheffield. The latter line is closed and lifted.

- Ecclesfield – known as Ecclesfield West to distinguish from Ecclesfield East on the former South Yorkshire Railway, later G.C.R. line. (Closed)
- Meadowhall: partly built on the site of Wincobank and Meadow Hall
- Brightside (Closed)
- Attercliffe Road (Closed)
- Sheffield Midland station (also served by the Wakefield and Dearne Valley lines)
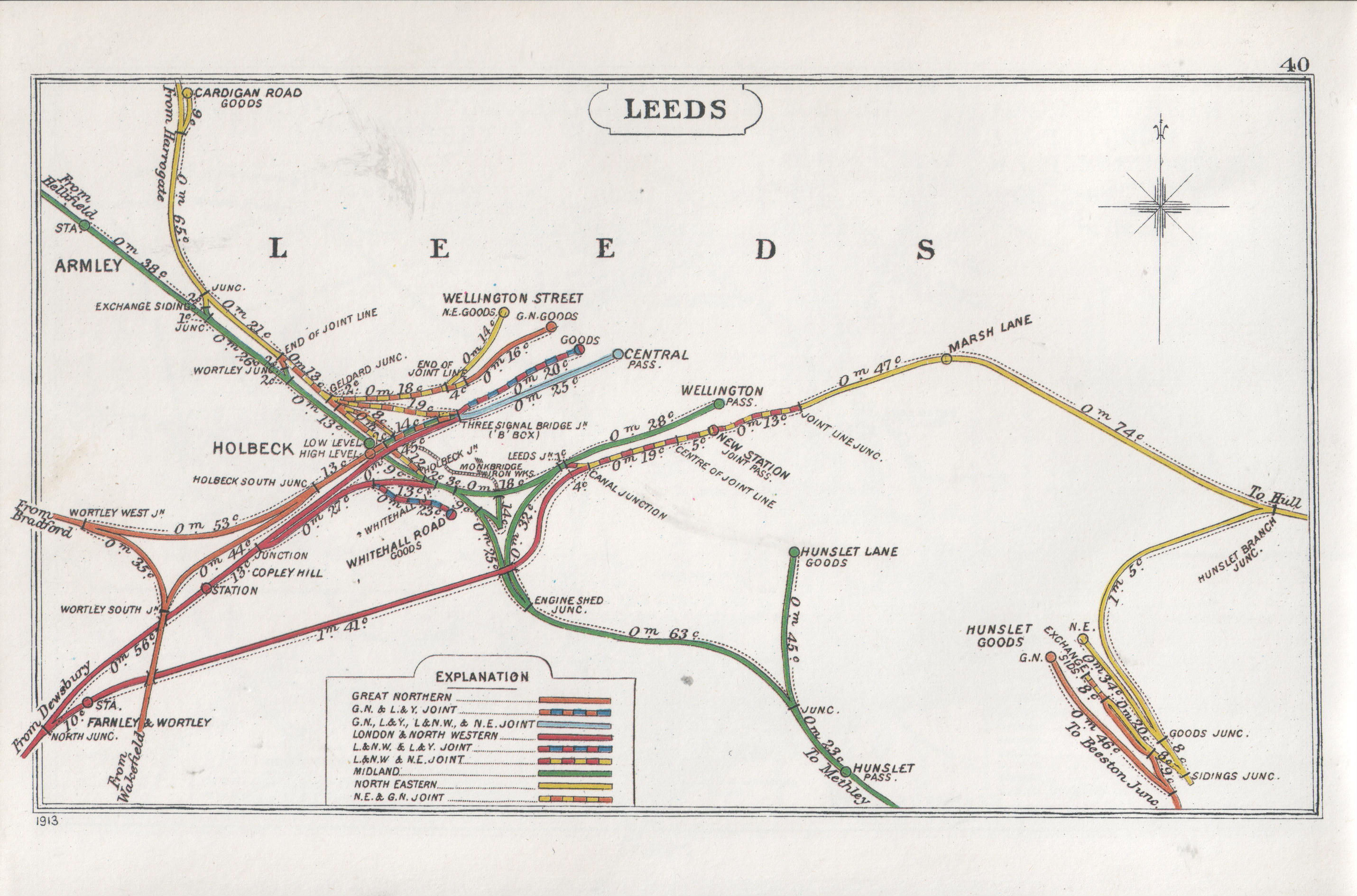
Railway lines in Leeds in 1913

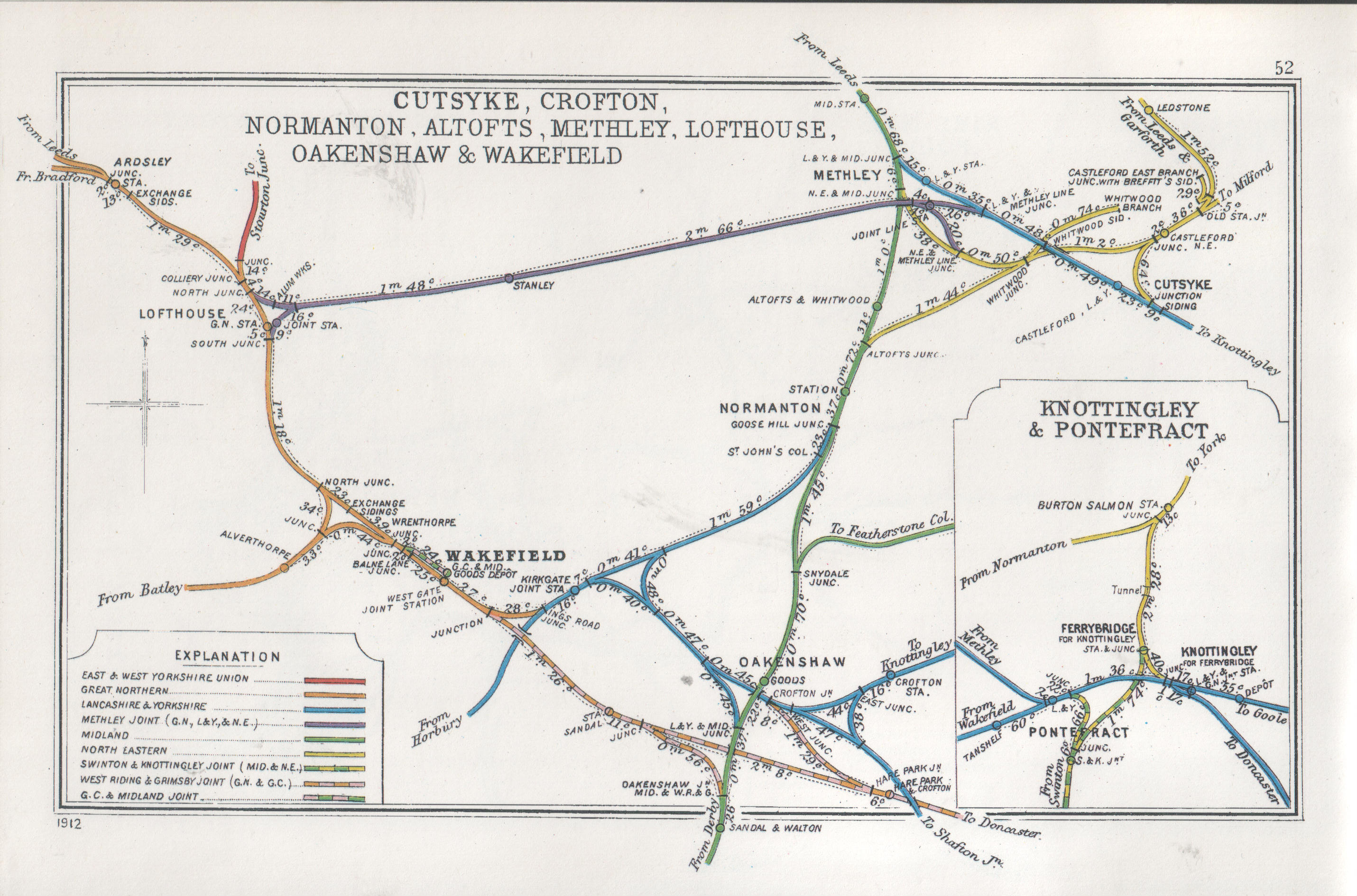
Railway lines through Methley, Castleford, Normanton, Wakefield in 1912

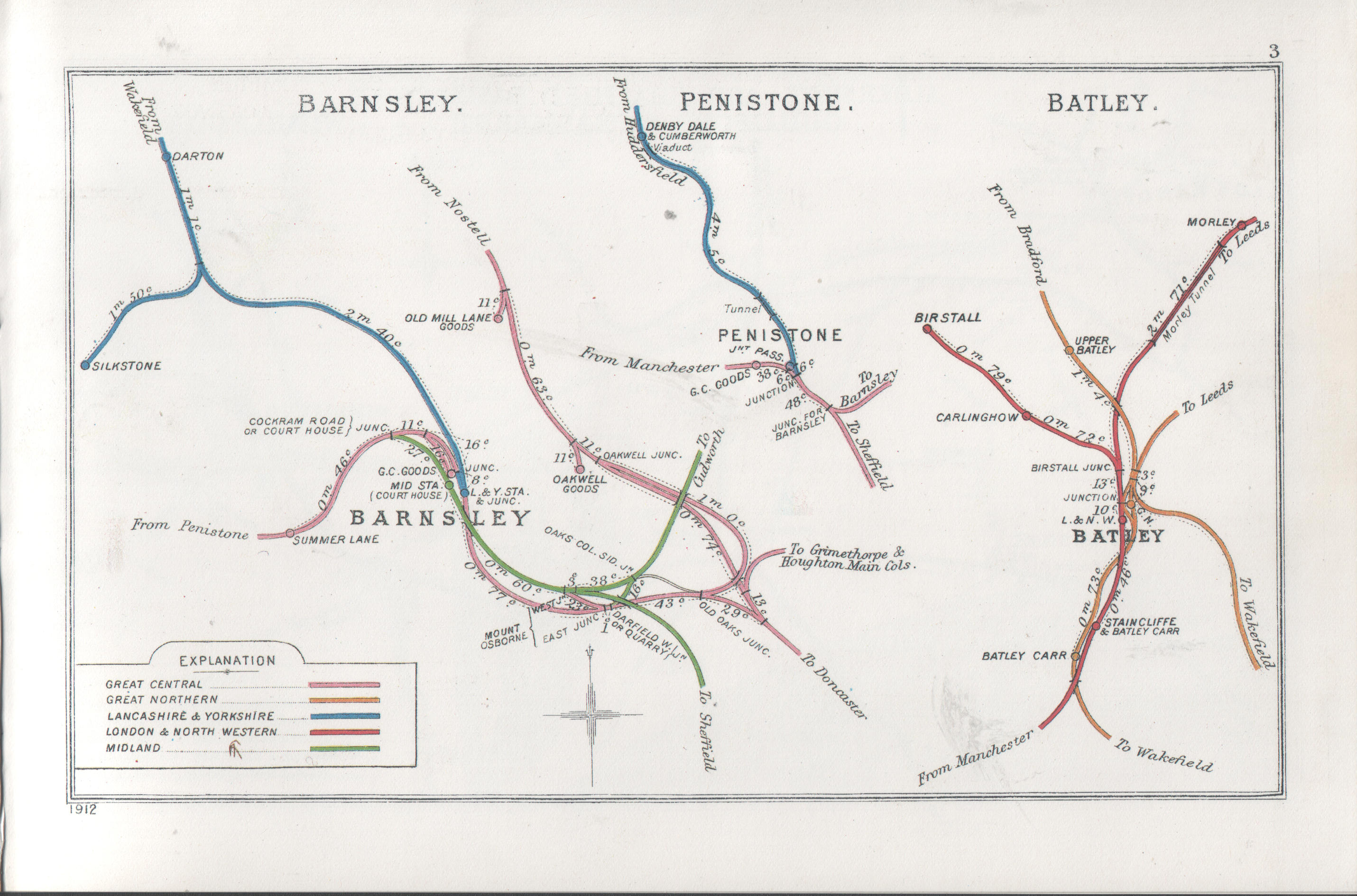
Railway lines through Barnsley in 1912

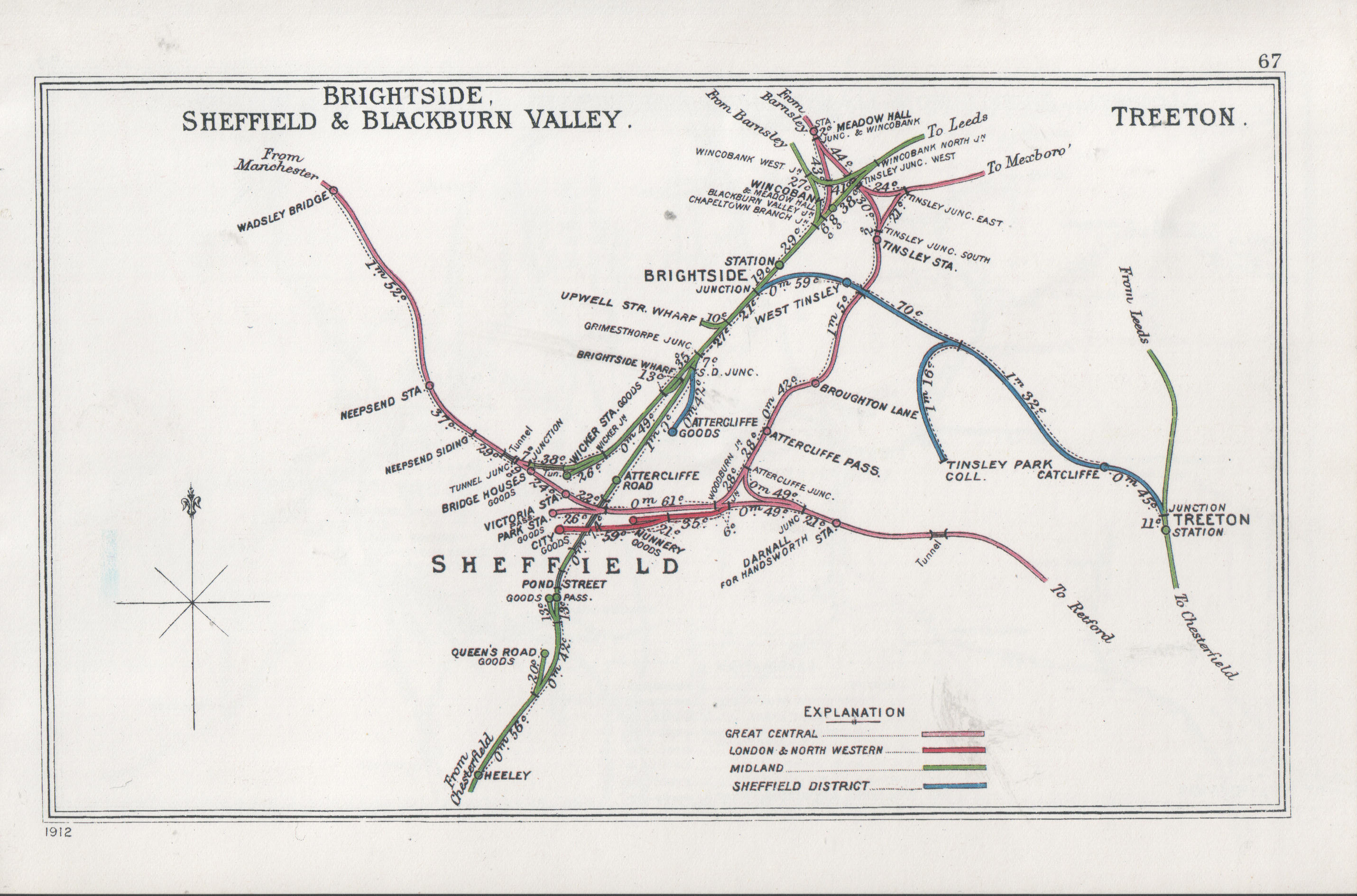
Railway lines in Sheffield in 1912
