= Hartley Pit railway station =

Short-lived railway station in Hartley, Northumberland

Hartley Pit

General information
- Location: Hartley, Northumberland; England
- Coordinates: 55.0836°N 1.5143°W
- Grid reference: NZ311766
- Platforms: 1

Other information
- Status: Disused

History
- Original company: Blyth, Seghill and Percy Main Railway
- Pre-grouping: Blyth and Tyne Railway

Key dates
- 3 May 1847: Opened
- 1851: Closed
Location

Hartley Pit railway station served the village of Hartley, Northumberland, North East England from 1847 to 1851 on what is now known as the Northumberland Line.

== History ==
The station opened on 3 May 1847 by the Blyth, Seghill & Percy Main Railway, predecessor of the Blyth and Tyne Railway. The station is thought to have been situated south of St Michael's Avenue at the east end of New Hartley's built-up area. The exact site of the station is not known, but it is thought to have been located close to Hartley Colliery, which would later be the site of the notorious Hartley Colliery Disaster occurred on 16 January 1862.

The station was short-lived and was replaced by a new Hartley station, approximately 150 yards (140 m) to the north east, in 1851.

Preceding station	Disused railways	Following station
Seaton Delaval; Line & station open	Blyth and Tyne Railway; Blyth, Seghill and Percy Main Railway	Newsham; Line & station open
