= Beaumont Asquith =

English footballer

Personal information
- Date of birth: 16 September 1910
- Place of birth: Painthorpe, Wakefield, England
- Date of death: 12 April 1977 (aged 66)
- Place of death: Barnsley, England
- Height: 5 ft 9 1/2 in (1.77 m)
- Position: Inside forward

Senior career*
Years	Team	Apps	(Gls)
- Painthorpe Amateurs
1933–1939	Barnsley	105	(40)
1939–1942	Manchester United	0	(0)
1942–1948	Barnsley	140	(5)
1948–1950	Bradford City	31	(4)
- Scarborough
Total		176	(49)
- * Club domestic league appearances and goals

Beaumont Asquith (16 September 1910 – 12 April 1977) was an English professional footballer who played as an inside forward.

== Career ==
Born in Painthorpe, Wakefield, Asquith played for Painthorpe Amateurs, Barnsley, Manchester United, Bradford City and Scarborough.
