= Church of St John the Divine, Calder Grove =

Church in West Yorkshire, England

Church of St John the Divine Calder Grove
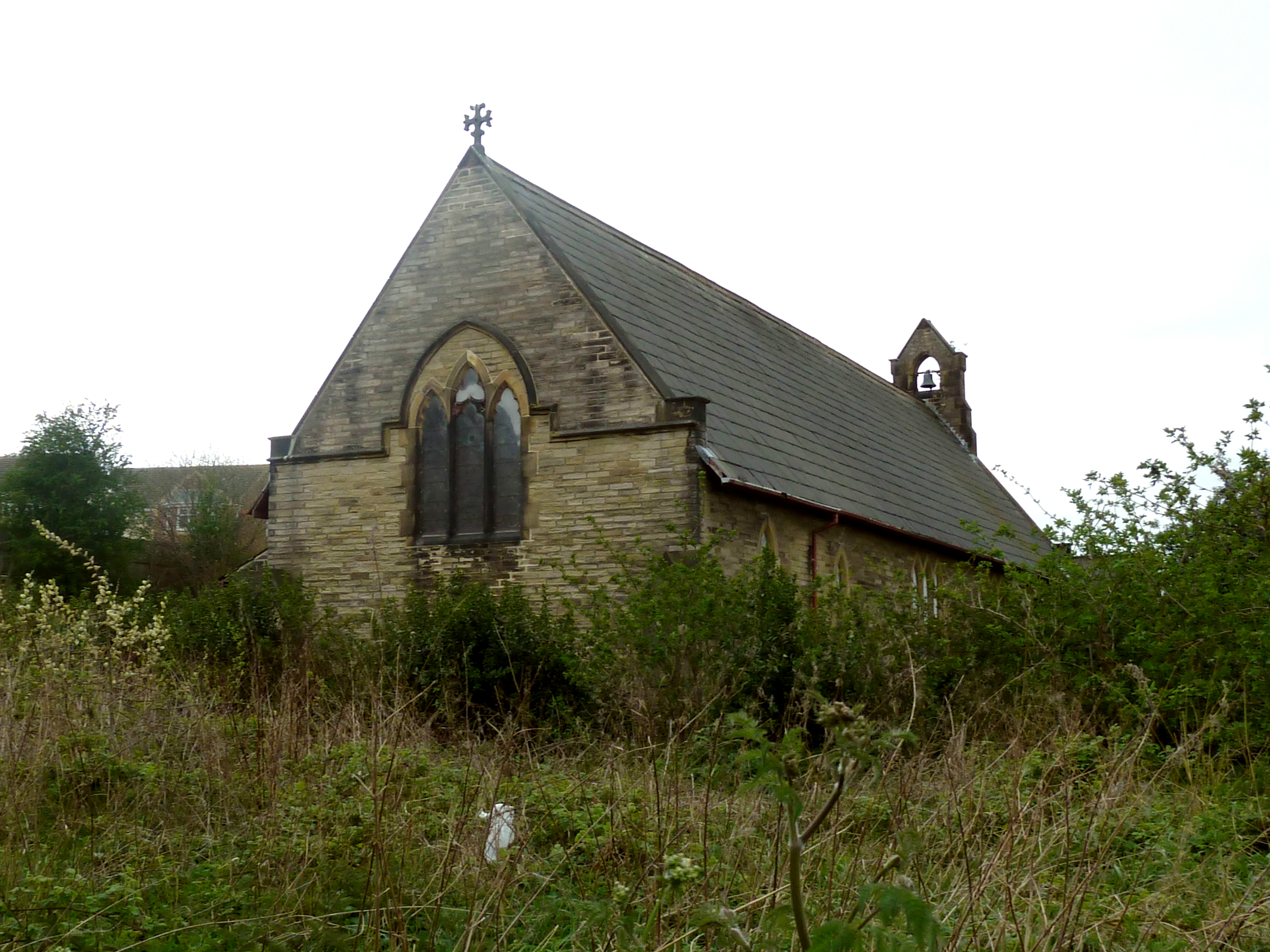

- Location in West Yorkshire
- 53°38′51″N 1°32′09″W
- OS grid reference: SE 30779 16879
- Location: Denby Dale Road West, Calder Grove, Wakefield; West Yorkshire WF4 3FG
- Country: England
- Denomination: Anglican
- Churchmanship: Central
- Website: The Church of England: St John the Divine, Calder Grove

History
- Founded: 1892
- Dedication: St John the Divine
- Dedicated: 23 May 1893
- Consecrated: 23 May 1893

Architecture
- Functional status: Redundant
- Heritage designation: Grade II listed, no.1431631
- Architect(s): W. Swinden Barber, FRIBA
- Architectural type: Church of England parish church
- Style: Arts and Crafts movement Gothic Revival
- Construction cost: £1,300
- Closed: 2018

Specifications
- Materials: Elland stone

Administration
- Diocese: Diocese of Wakefield
- Archdeaconry: Pontefract 402
- Deanery: Wakefield 40206
- Parish: St. James, Chapelthorpe 400180 40/180

Clergy
- Vicar: Interregnum

The Church of St John the Divine, designed by William Swinden Barber, was built as a mission church in 1892–1893 in the parish of St James, Chapelthorpe, Crigglestone, Wakefield, West Yorkshire, England. It is Grade II listed. It was funded by local benefactor Mary Mackie in memory of her husband. It is of Gothic Revival and Arts and Crafts design. The exterior is small, plain and simple and the interior is low church; nevertheless the interior contains a fine scissor-truss roof which retains its original 1892 stencil paintings. The church closed in 2018. In 2020 the church was purchased with a view to conversion into a four-bedroom home: plans were approved by Wakefield Council in 2024.

== Location ==
The building is located just off Denby Dale Road in Calder Grove, Crigglestone, on the south-west edge of Wakefield. At the time of construction, this was a coal-mining and rural area.

== Founders and benefactors ==
The building was commissioned in memory of her husband John Mackie, JP (1836–1891), by Mrs Mary Elizabeth Mackie (1844–1922) of Watford Villa, New Mills, Derbyshire and of Cliff House, Calder Grove Crigglestone. She also commissioned St James the Less Church and some almshouses in New Mills, designed by the same architect (W.S. Barber) in 1878–1880. The two buildings are not dissimilar.

John Mackie's father was Robert Jefferson Mackie, a rich local corn factor from a Scottish family, whose eldest son was Robert Bownas Mackie, Liberal MP for Wakefield 1880–1885. R.J. Mackie's fourth son was John, who received an education at Wesley College, Sheffield plus the gift of Cliff House which carried attached benefits. Thus Mackie was a landowner, the owner of Cliff Colliery and of the Freeclay works in Crigglestone, and a local benefactor. In 1866 he married Mary Elizabeth Ingham, daughter of James Ingham, the owner of a calico print works at New Mills, Derbyshire.

Thereafter, the couple spent half their time in New Mills, and the other half in Calder Grove. Mackie paid for a new school at nearby Painthorpe, completed in 1875. In Derbyshire in the same year he became chairman of the New Mill School Board, and later on was a council representative for New Mills and an alderman on Derbyshire County Council. Back in Crigglestone in 1885, Mackie became chairman of the Liberal Association. While at Calder Grove, he served as a Sunday school teacher, was at one time a delegate to the Diocesan conference, and in 1899 was elected Wakefield YMCA's president. He died unexpectedly at the age of 54 after catching a chill at his and Mary's 25th wedding anniversary celebrations at Crigglestone. He was given a big funeral and buried in Derbyshire. A granite drinking fountain was erected at New Mills in his memory.

During her married life in Calder Grove, Mary Mackie organised yearly soirees in the new schoolroom for the local working people, and founded the Criggleston Girls' Friendly Society. Besides erecting the Church of St John the Divine, Calder Grove, in her husband's memory, Mrs Mackie also funded a stained glass east window in the Church of St James, Chapelthorpe in 1892; the window was destroyed by fire in 1951. She also built an institute in Dirtcar, Crigglestone, in 1904. This was dismantled and re-erected next to St John's in 1914 for use as a church hall, and demolished in 2014.

== History ==
Plans were approved for a church in the "Early English style of architecture" by the Ecclesiastical Commission in April 1892 at a building cost of £1,300. The Wakefield Conservative MP Colonel Albany Hawkes Charlesworth donated the land and gave £100 towards costs. The church was consecrated by the Bishop of Wakefield on Tuesday 23 May 1893; his sermon was based on John xvi.14, He will glorify Me, for He will take of what is Mine and declare it to you. The congregation at the dedication service included Mrs Mackie, her brother in law and other relatives, people from "leading families in the locality" including Briggs, Thompson and Cartwright, and numerous local clergy. Some of the local gentry had already "contributed liberally" towards the cost of building, and the sum of £32 16s 11d was collected after the service.

== Architect ==
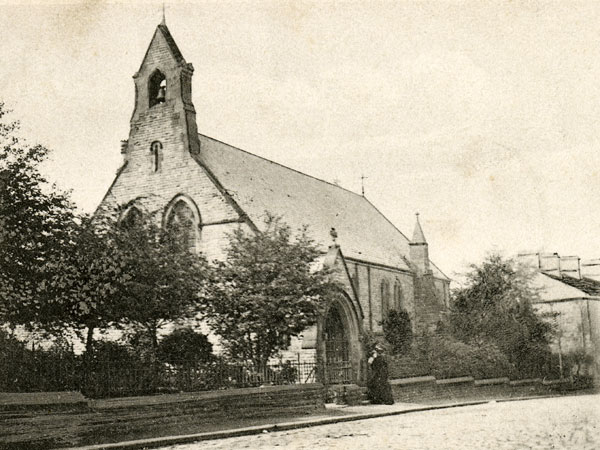
St James the Less, New Mills

William Swinden Barber (1832–1908) was a Gothic Revival and Arts and Crafts architect based in Halifax and Brighouse, who had a long career in which he produced many churches and other buildings in the area. Many of his works are now Grade II listed buildings. Some of his major designs which would have made his reputation and recommended him for this task are the mansion Spring Hall, Halifax (1871), the Victoria Cross at Akroydon (1875), and the large Church of St Jude, Savile Park, Halifax (1888). Additionally, Barber had already designed Mrs Mackie's first funded church, St James the Less at New Mills, Derbyshire (1880), which is of similar design to St John the Divine, and was dedicated to her parents. It is now a listed building and the Springbank Arts Centre.

== Building ==
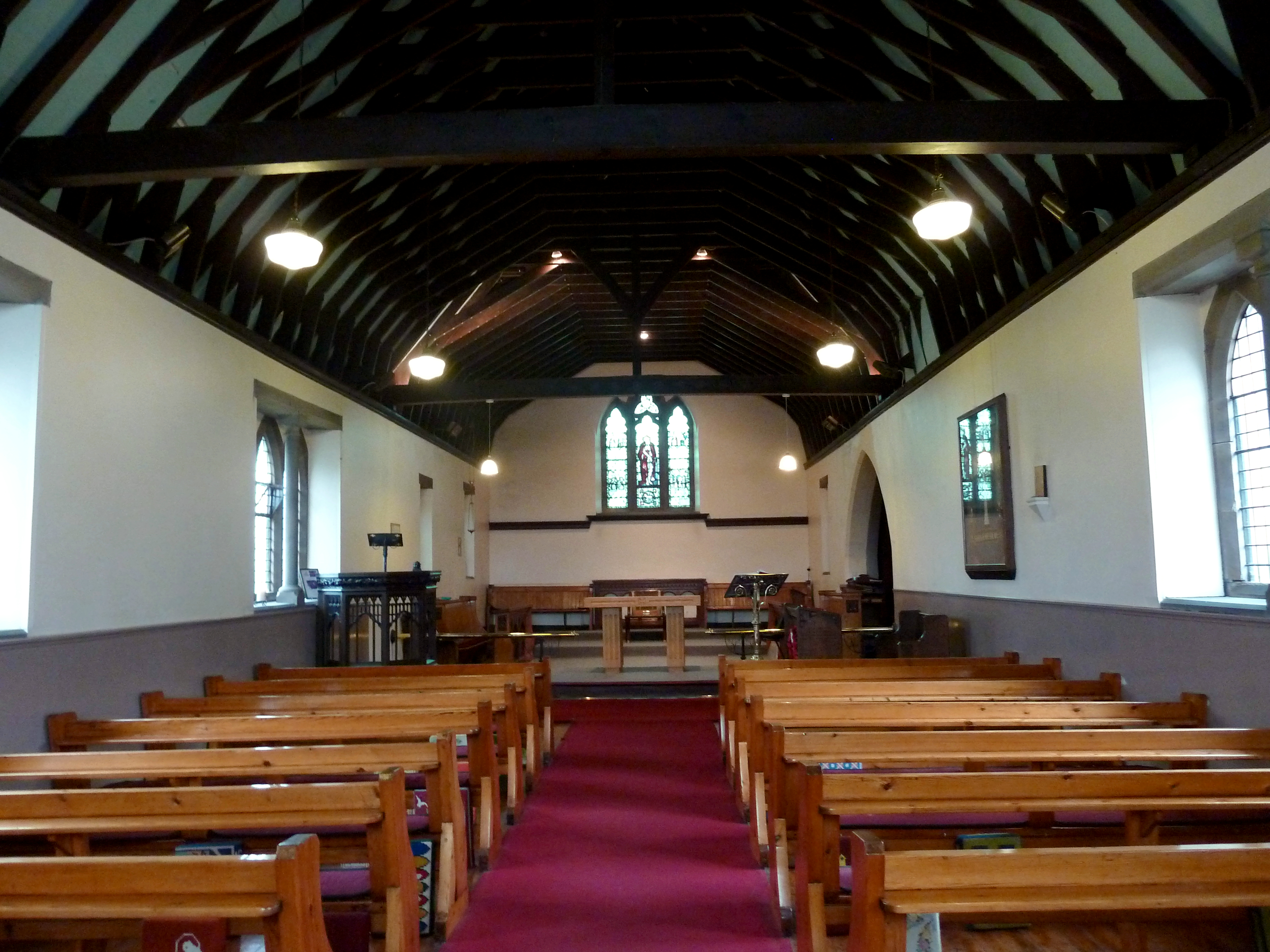
St John's interior

The building is on the City of Wakefield Metropolitan Council, 2008, List of buildings, Scheduled Ancient Monuments and Buildings of Local Interest (p. 47). That is to say, it is locally listed, but is not listed by English Heritage.

=== 1893 description ===
The building was described in Leeds newspapers in 1893 as "a Mission church in the Early English style." It is built of Elland stone with Huddersfield stone dressing. The nave has an open-timberwork roof and at the time of the consecration it was 50 feet (15 m) long. The chancel was 22 feet (6.7 m) long. The original pews, which as of April 2014 had been re-varnished but were still in place, were of stained and varnished red deal. The east window, installed in 1893, is a memorial to John Mackie.

=== Exterior ===
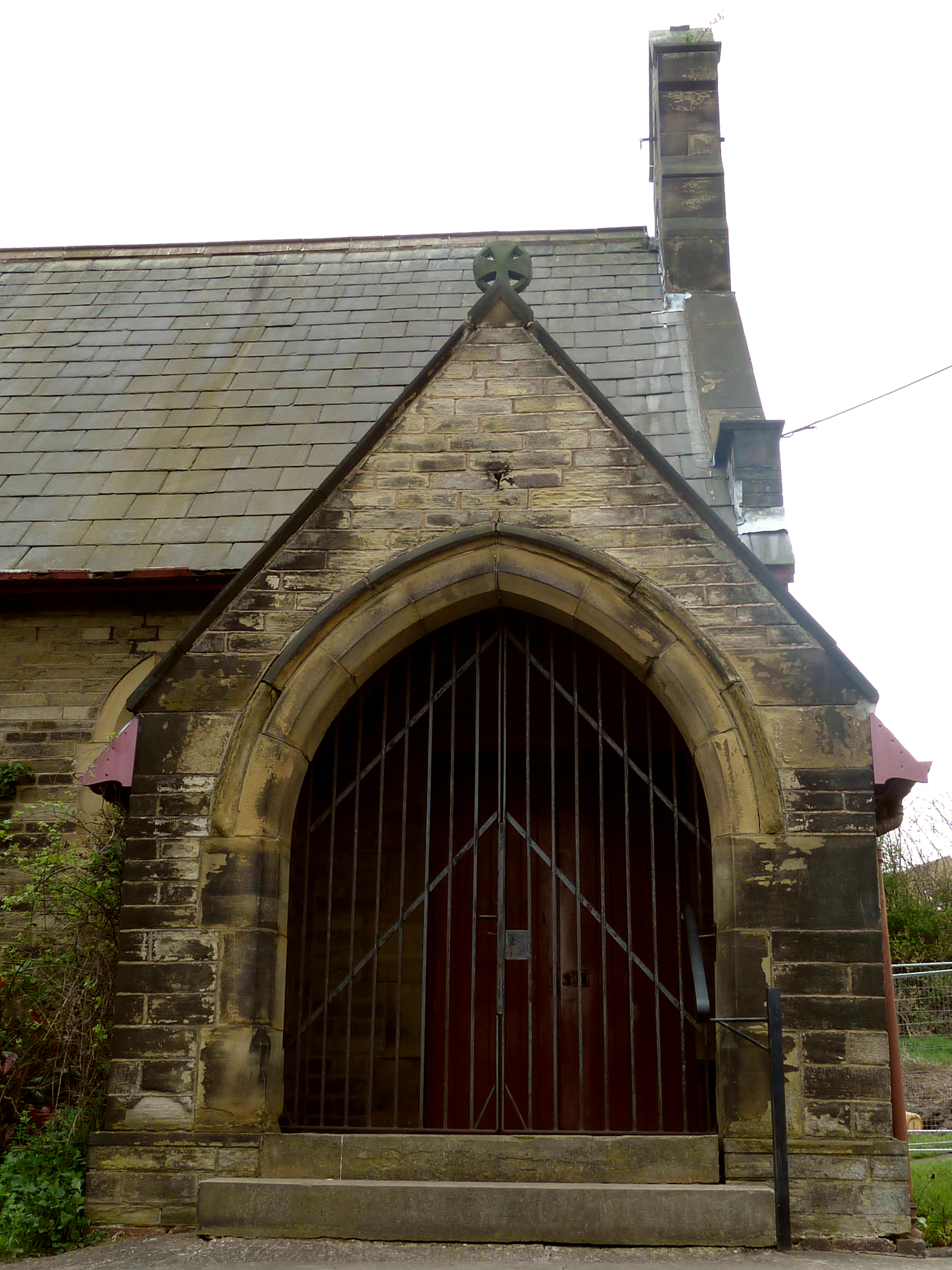
The porch

This is a mature work by the architect who retired in 1898. The nave and chancel are combined structurally into one space with four walls, one roof overall, and no columns or aisles. There is a basic porch leading into the nave on the north side. A combined lean-to on the south side houses the organ chamber and vestry, which share an arched opening into the chancel. The exterior combines a simple Victorian low church aspect using just the basics of Gothic Revival architecture. Thus, apart from two small crosses on the apexes of the roof and porch, there are only two other decorations: the shaped drip moulding over the west window, and the minimal moulding at the base of the porch archway.

=== Interior ===
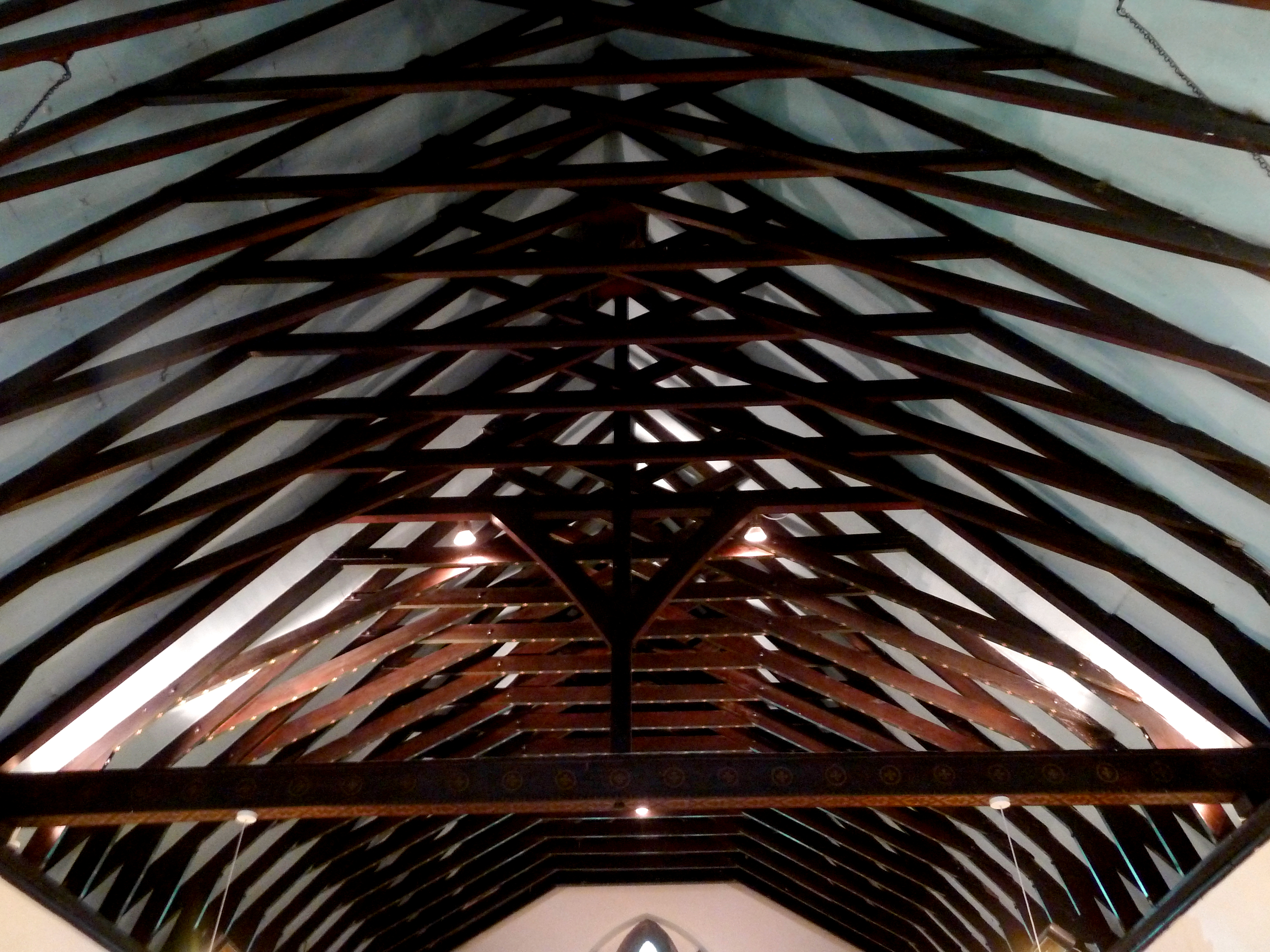
Scissor-truss roof

There is a contrast between the plain exterior of the building, and its interior. Seen unexpectedly by the visitor upon entrance is the scissor-truss roof, which after more than a century retains rare stencil paintings by Powell Bros of Leeds on the chancel beams. Beneath the paint on the plastered north and south walls of the nave are hidden stencil paintings and possibly spirit frescoes by the same artists, revealed in a pre–1914 photograph in the church archives. The structure is intentionally plain and simple, but Barber has still managed to include a few small columns by recessing the three-light nave windows into the wall, and fitting a single slender supporting column into each recess.

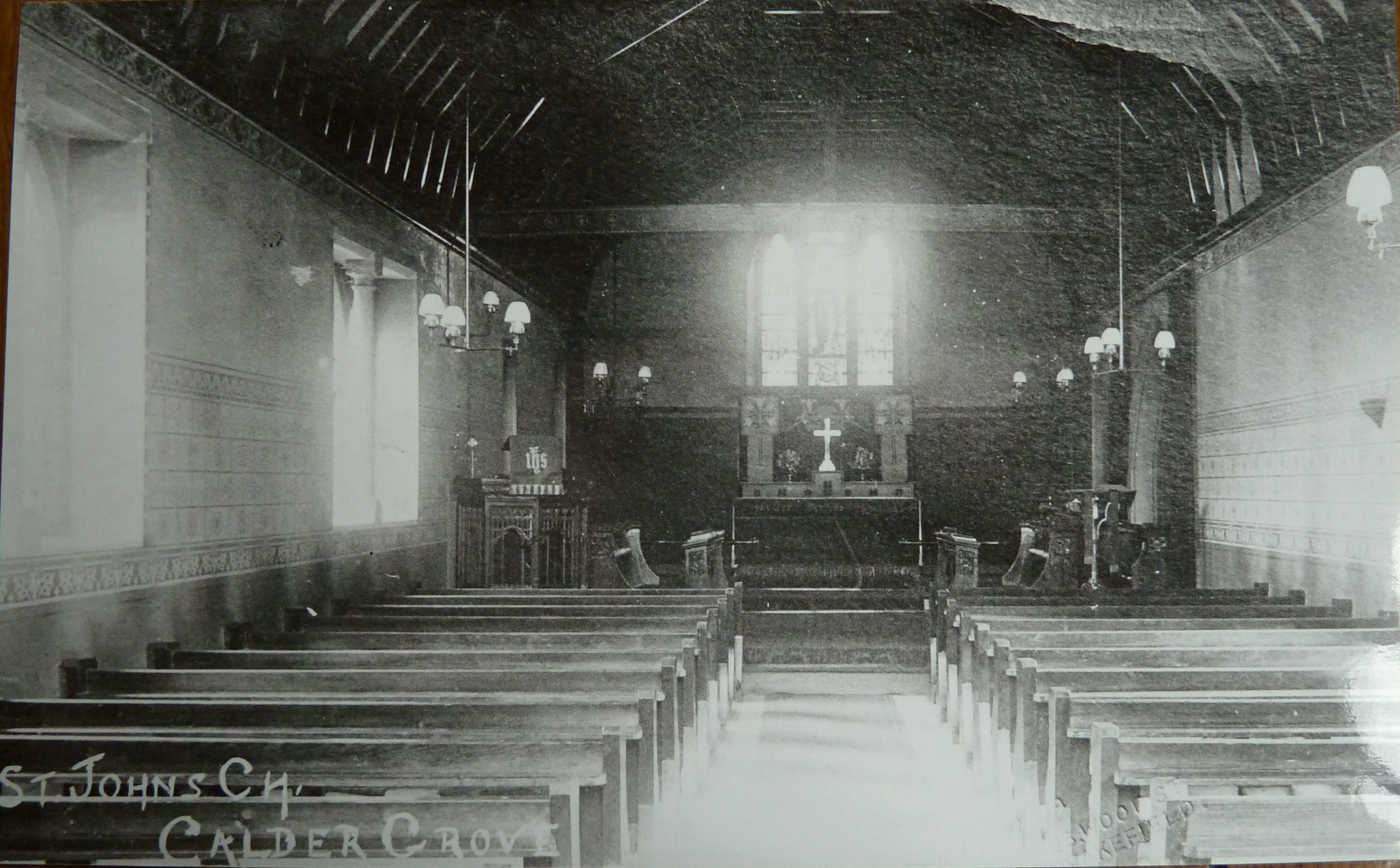
Old photo showing wall stencils

There are four stained glass windows in the chancel - in Gothic Revival style but without tracery. The east window of 1893, dedicated to John Mackie the husband of its benefactor, shows Jesus Christ and the Lamb of God. The two north chancel windows show John the Baptist (1908) and John the Divine, probably of the same decade. The south chancel window shows the Virgin and Child, also of the first decade of the 20th century.

The church still contains fixtures and furnishings designed and commissioned by Barber. This includes the wrought iron bolt, and door-handle plates on the porch door. It also includes the carved wooden pulpit, altar-front, pews, and choir stalls, and the carved stone font.

There is an early 20th century pipe organ. The bell gable incorporates the original bell of 1893 by Mears & Stainbank. The bell rope passes through a hole in the roof and hangs inside the west window.

The building has a cut bench mark on the exterior north side.

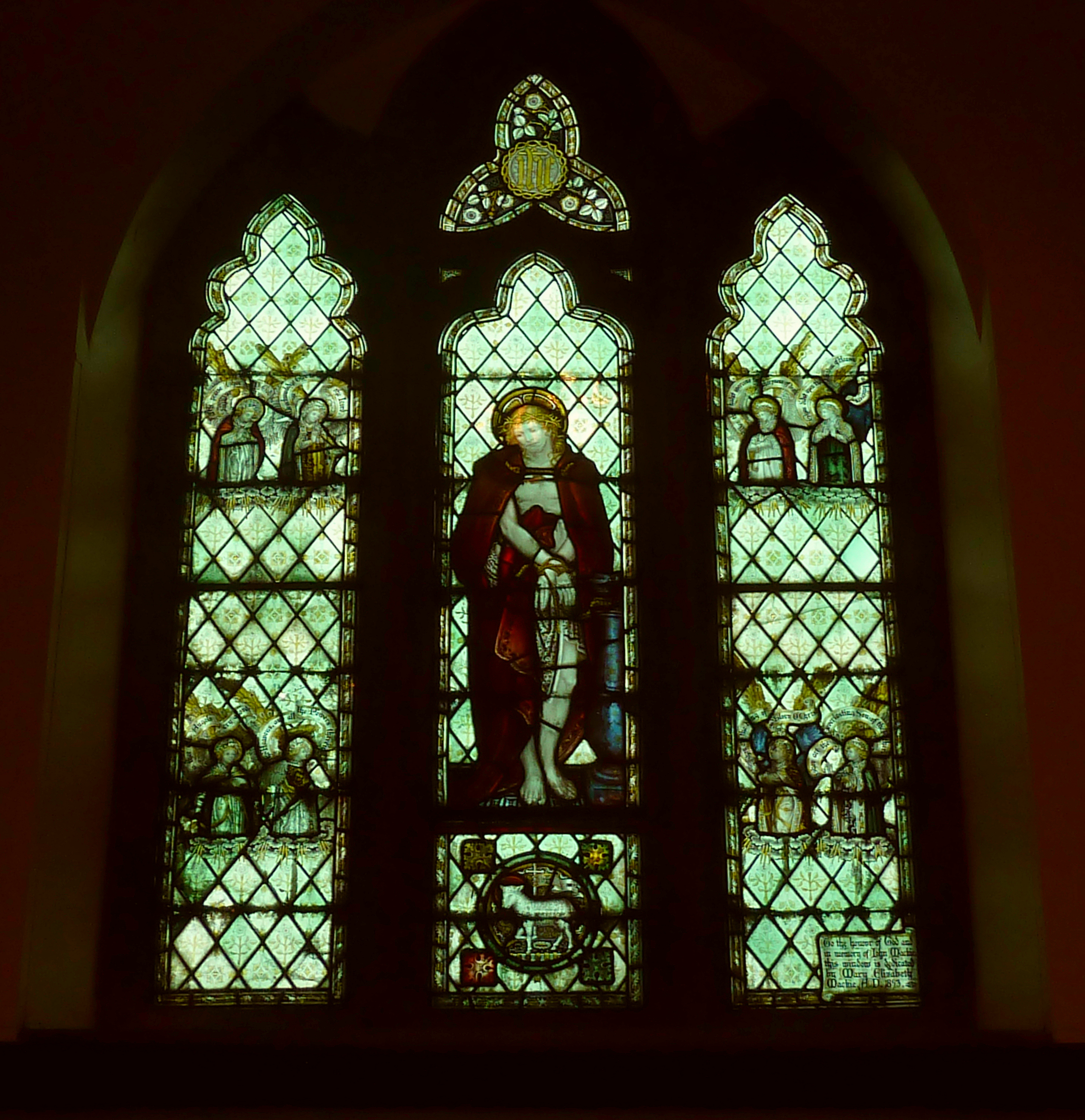
The 1983 east window dedicated to John Mackie

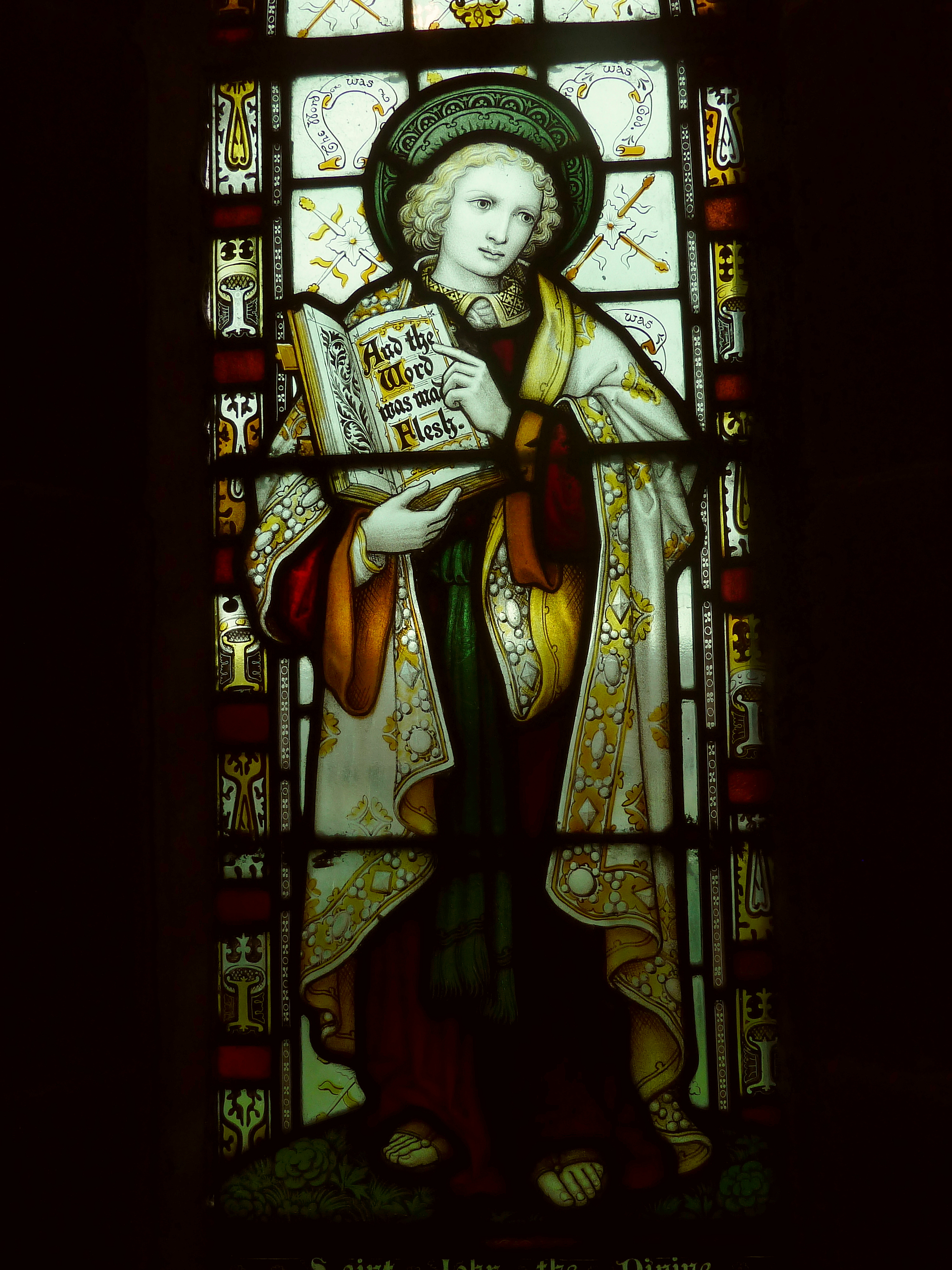
North chancel window featuring St John the Divine or John of Patmos

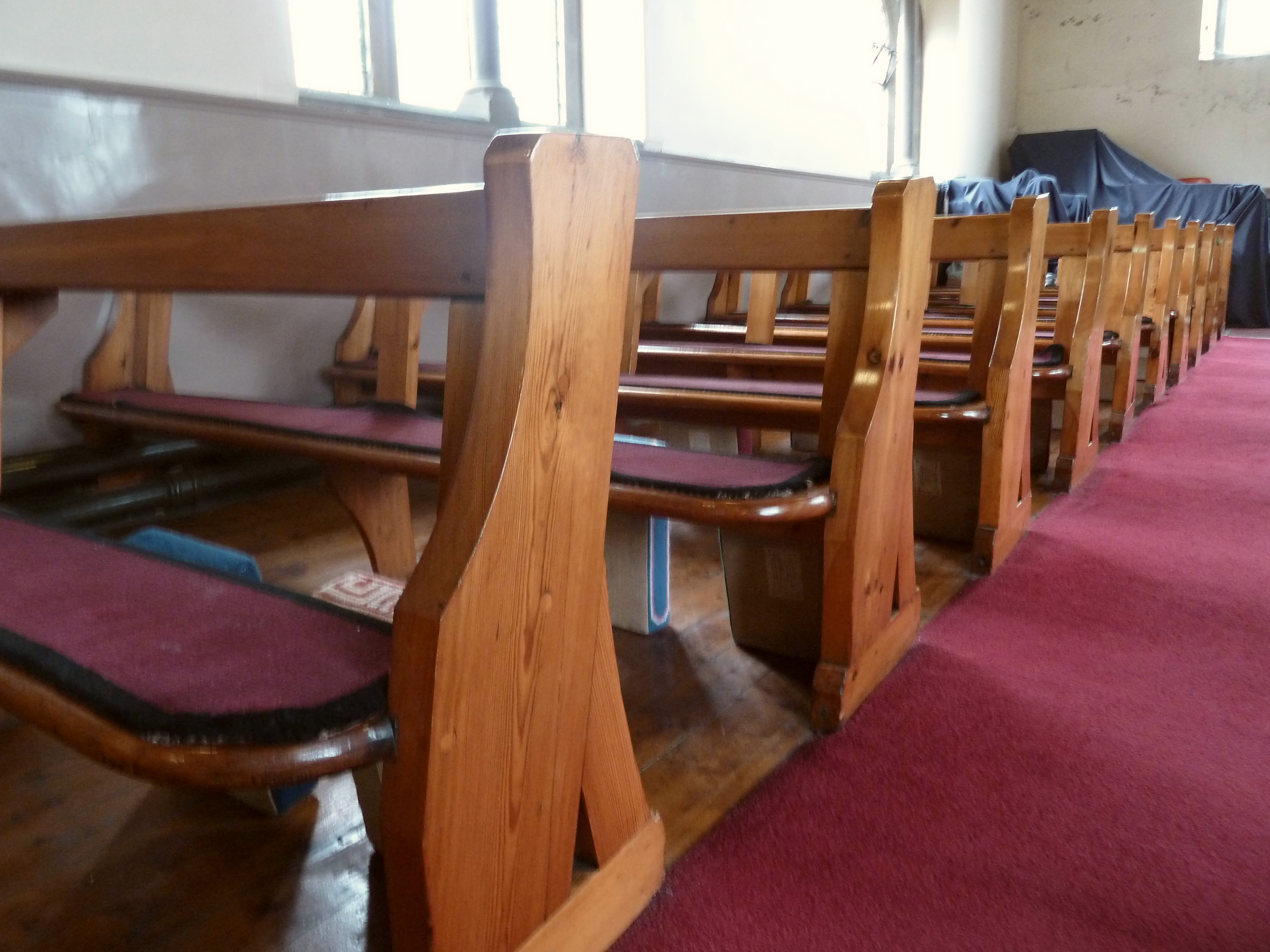
Pews designed by Barber (re-varnished)

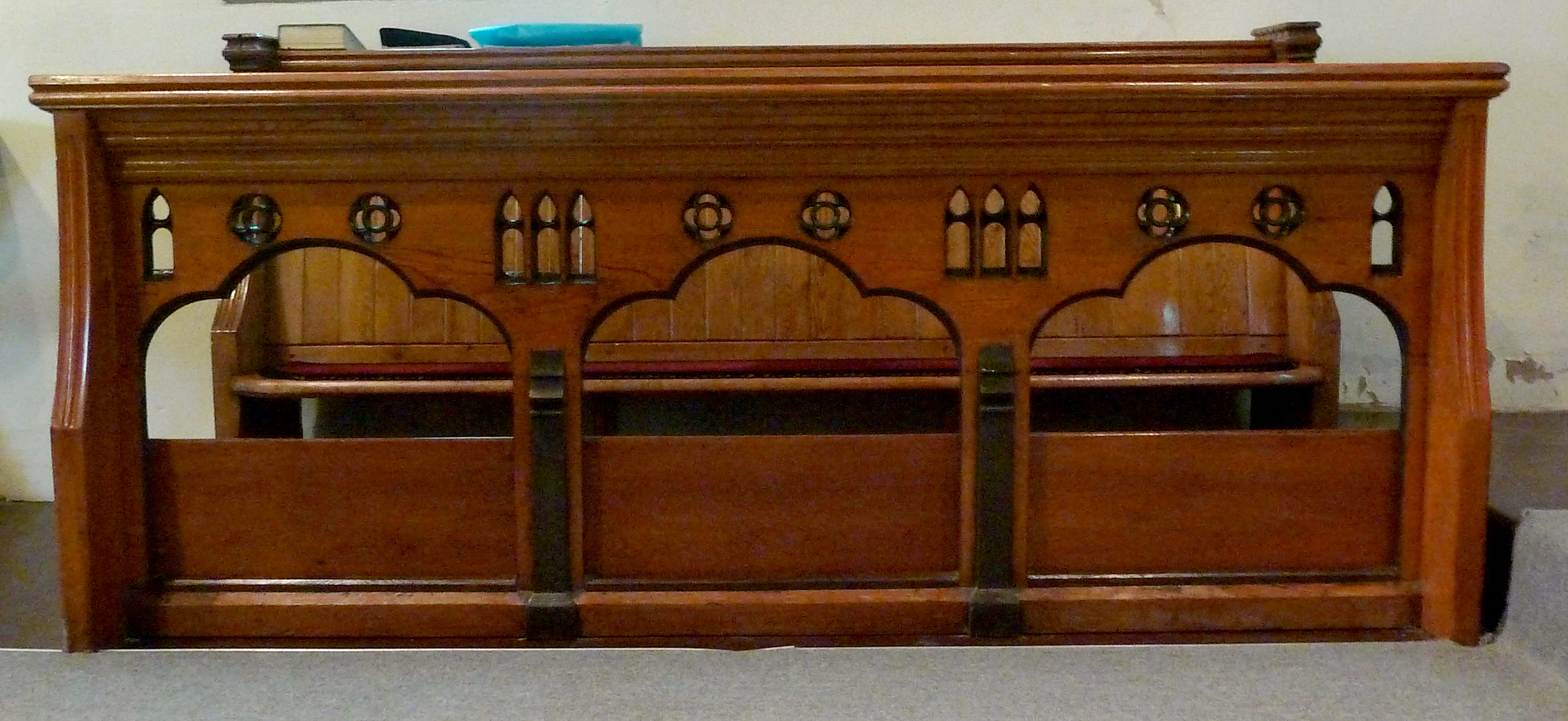
Choir stalls designed by Barber (re-varnished)

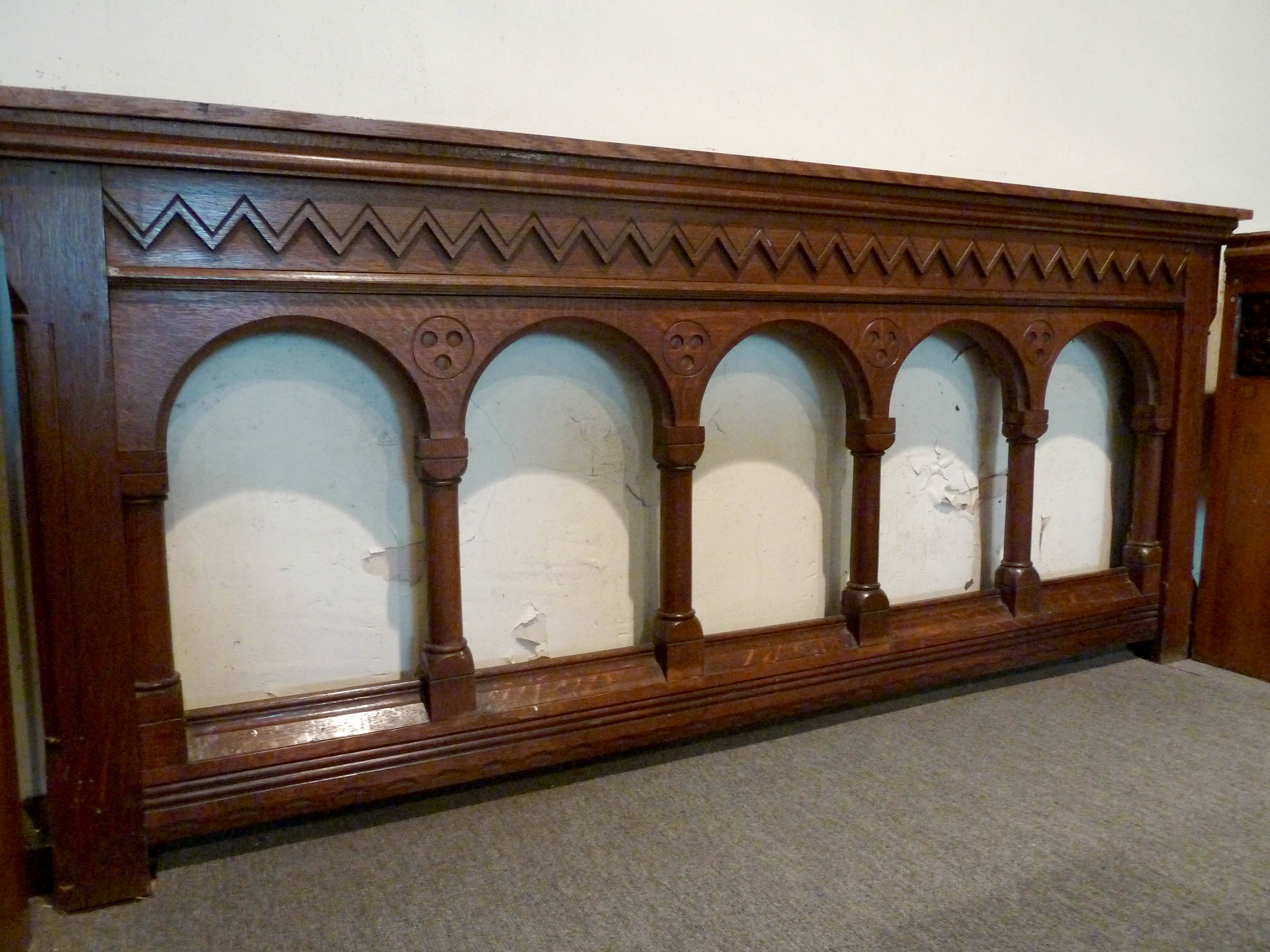
Altar-front designed by Barber

=== Repairs and re-ordering ===
- In 1903 the east end of the chancel collapsed, having subsided into old mine-workings below. The chancel was rebuilt to Barber's original plans, re-using the same materials. The stencils on the east wall were lost at that time.
- If one compares the original plans of 1892 to photographs of the existing building in 2014, it can be seen that the stone cross intended for the roof gable above the chancel has been at some point removed to the porch gable. The metal cross which was originally fixed atop the bell gable is now fixed on the roof over the chancel. (illustrated below)
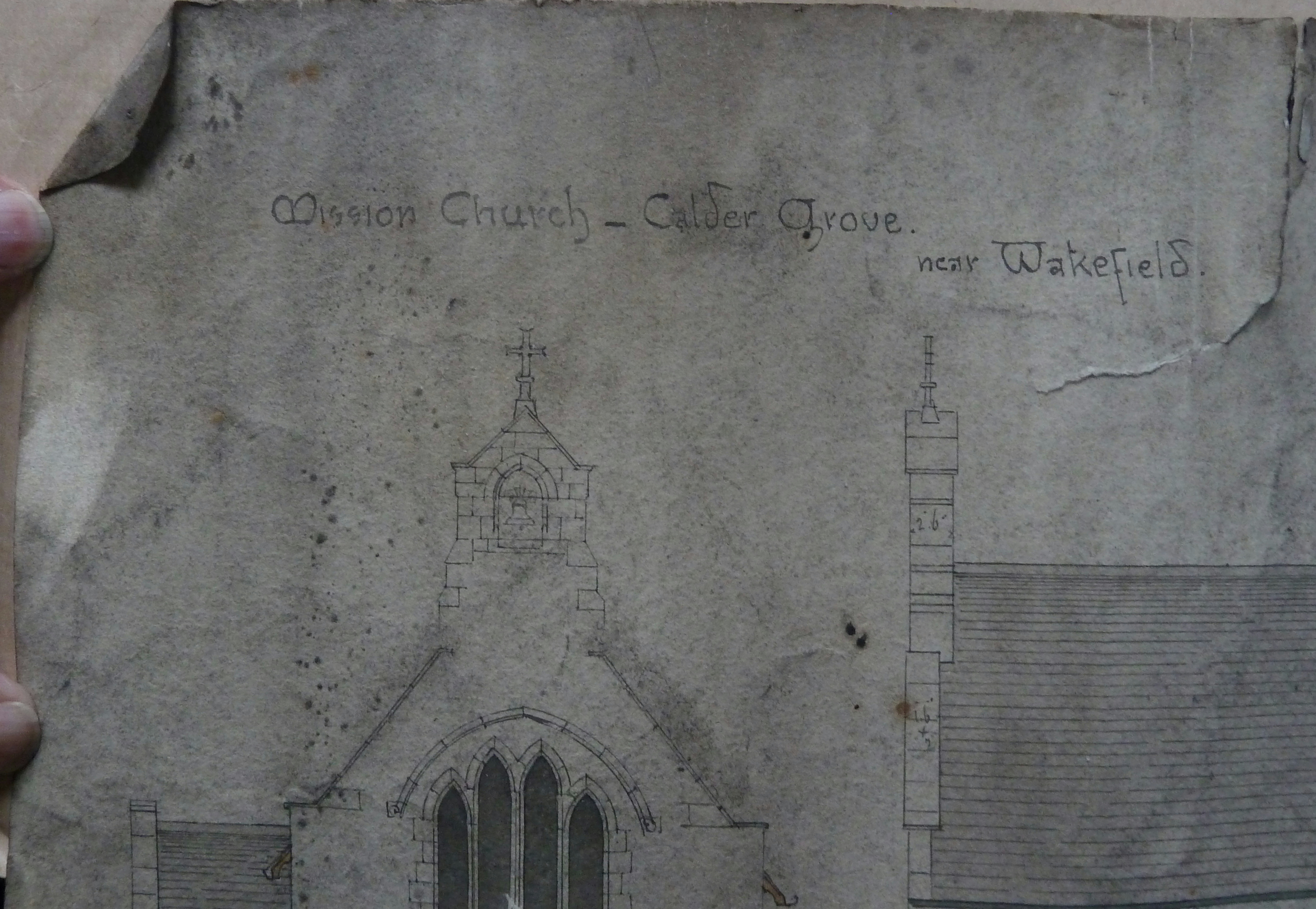
Planned metal cross on bell gable

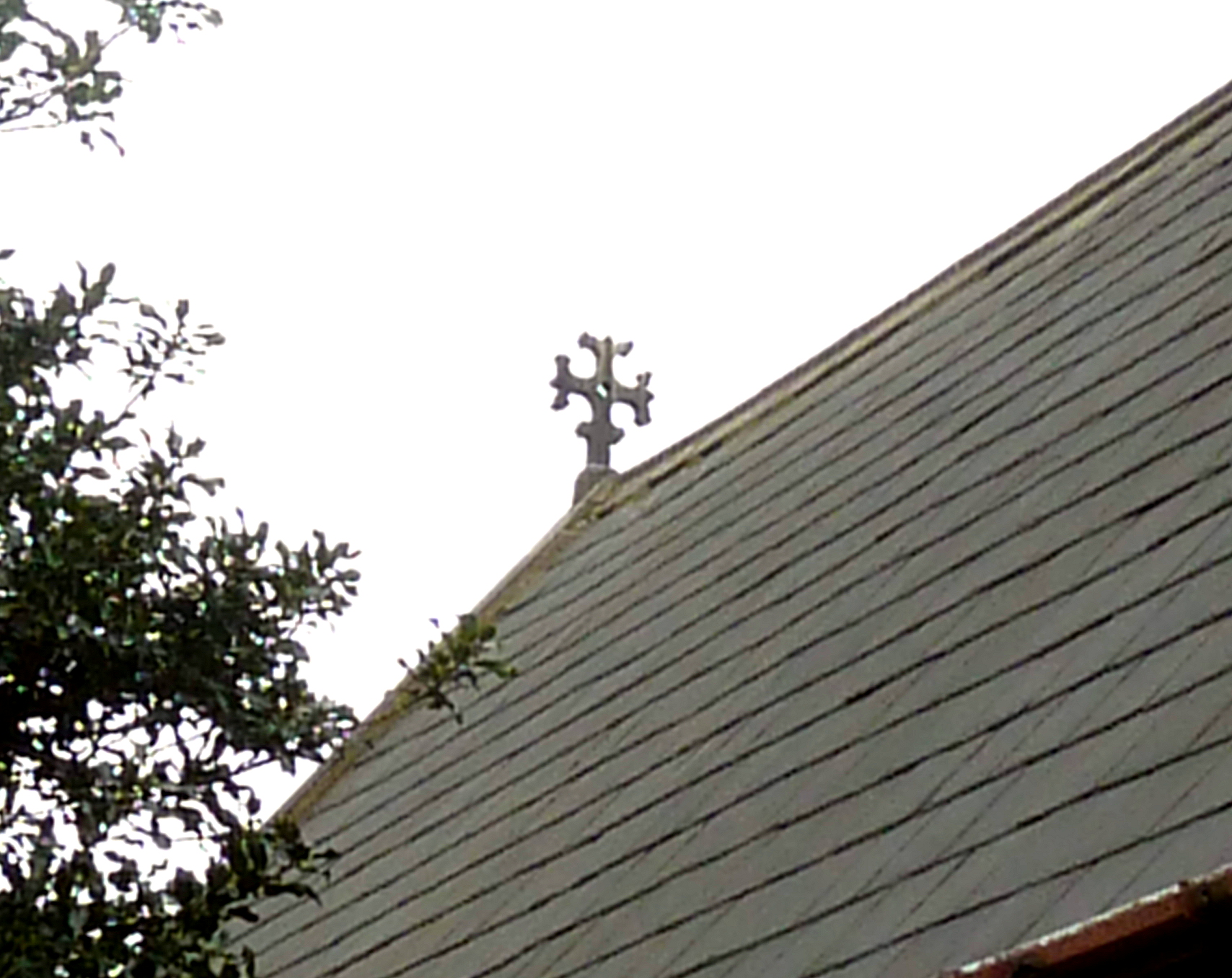
Bell gable cross now on chancel roof

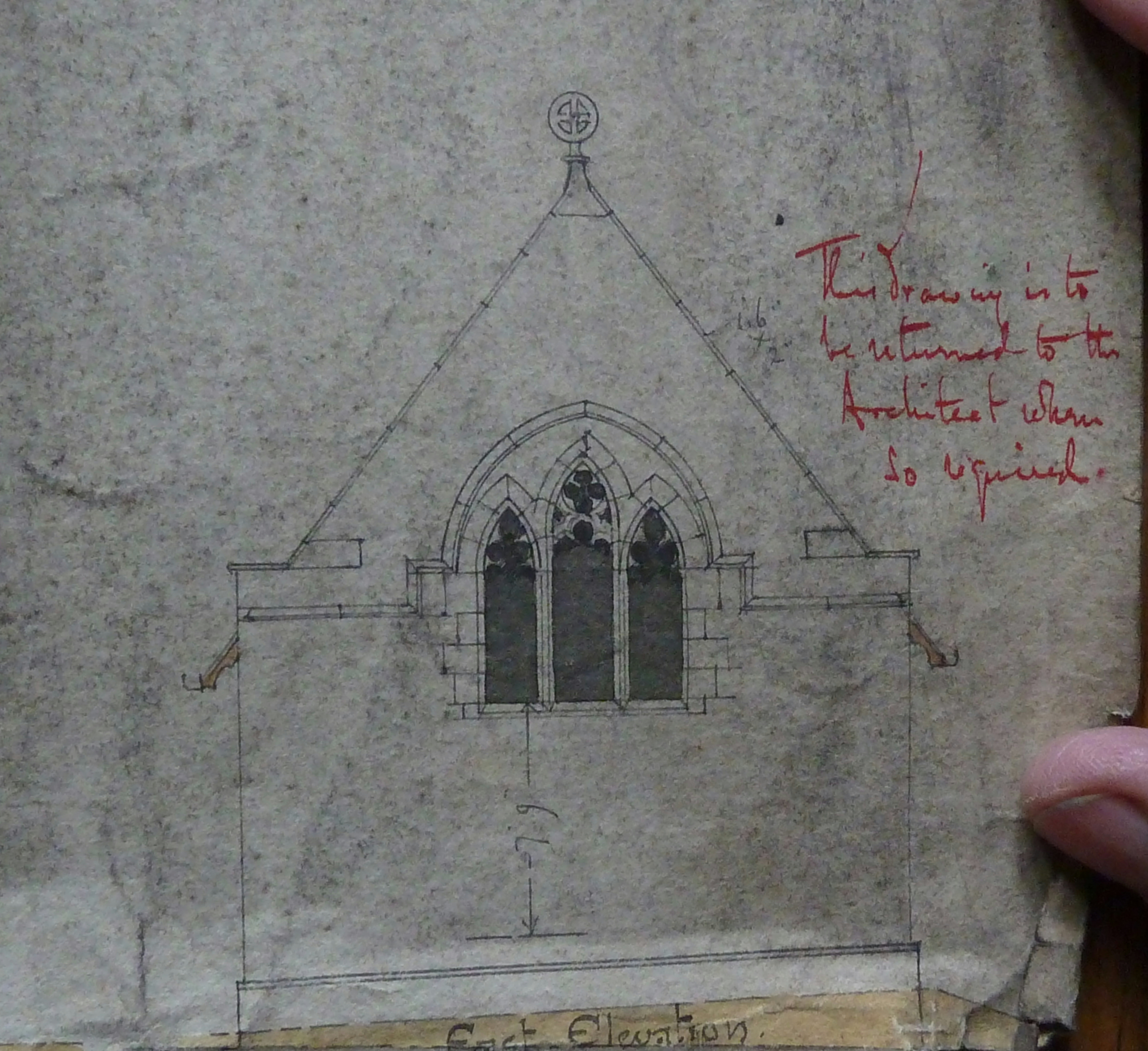
Planned stone cross on chancel roof

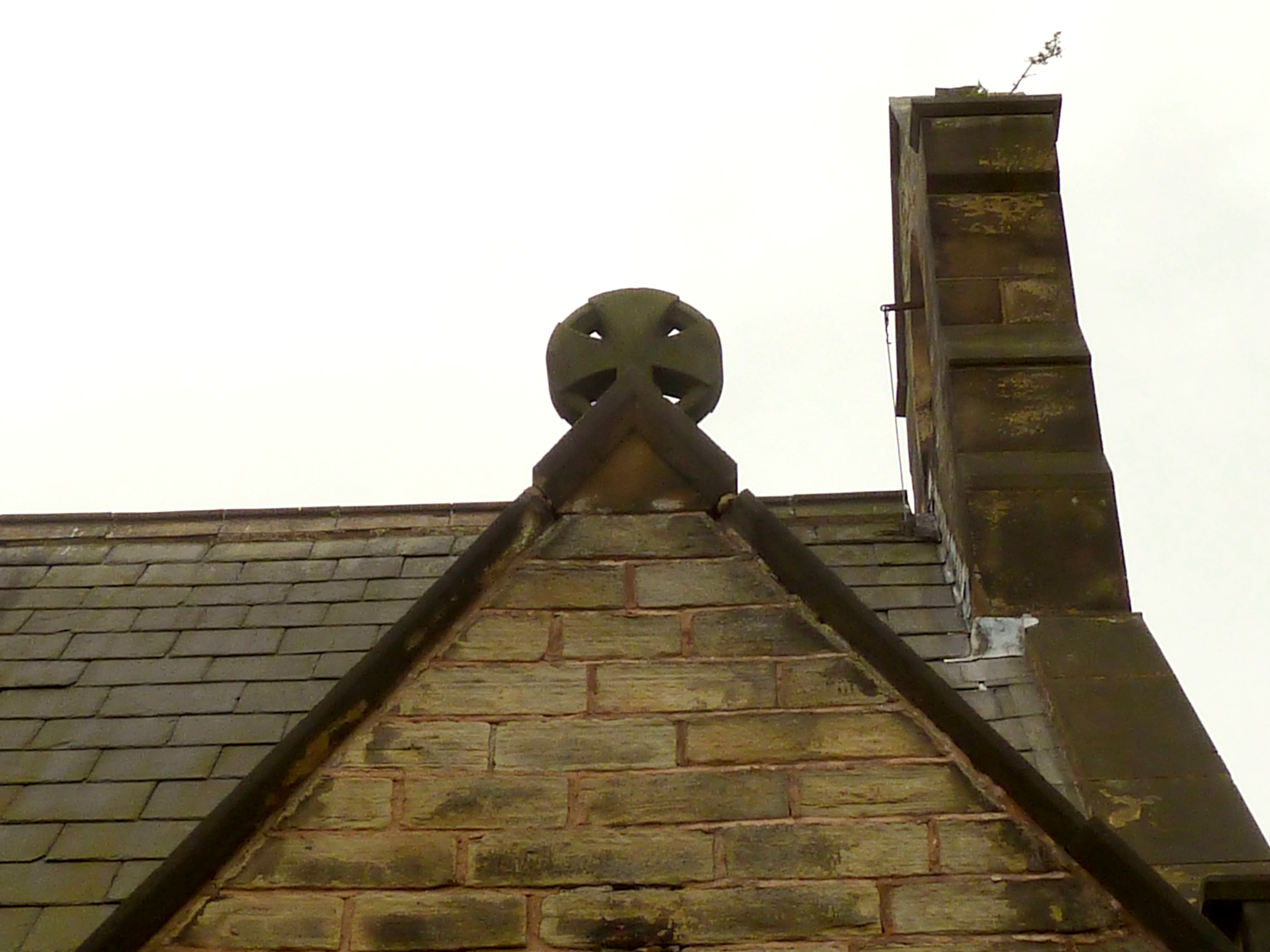
Stone chancel roof cross now on porch gable
- As of 2014, the interior plaster on the west wall has been replaced several times due to dampness possibly caused by inadequate flashing between the bell gable and roof tiles, together with the fact that the bell rope must pass through a hole in the roof. This means that any original stencils beneath the later paint on the west wall are now gone.
- During a 21st-century interior re-ordering, Barber's original altar was dismantled, and only its carved wooden front remains, standing against the east wall. At the same time, Barber's designed and commissioned dark-varnished pews and choir stalls were stripped and re-varnished in a light colour.
- As of April–May 2014 a major re-ordering is planned, so as to adapt the building for dual use as a church and a hall for hire to raise funds. This means that Barber's original pews are to be sold, and a new position must be found for the font. The planning application states that two windows will be removed on the south side of the nave, the sills will be dismantled, and the openings are to be retained for a kitchen serving hatch and an entry point for the extension. It is not known whether the toilet and kitchen, necessarily visible from the road, will be of sympathetic design. Barber's original polished deal floor, which still exists, may be replaced with other flooring. The church is expected therefore to lose its present completeness of original structure and furnishing by a major local architect. Because the new extension will necessitate re-plastering the western half of the south wall, any remaining original interior wall paintings still hidden under paint will be lost. Planning application no.13/00146/FUL for the extension was submitted on 18 January 2013 and has been granted. When the application was submitted, the Church Architect did not know of the building's date, its architect or its history.

== Curates ==
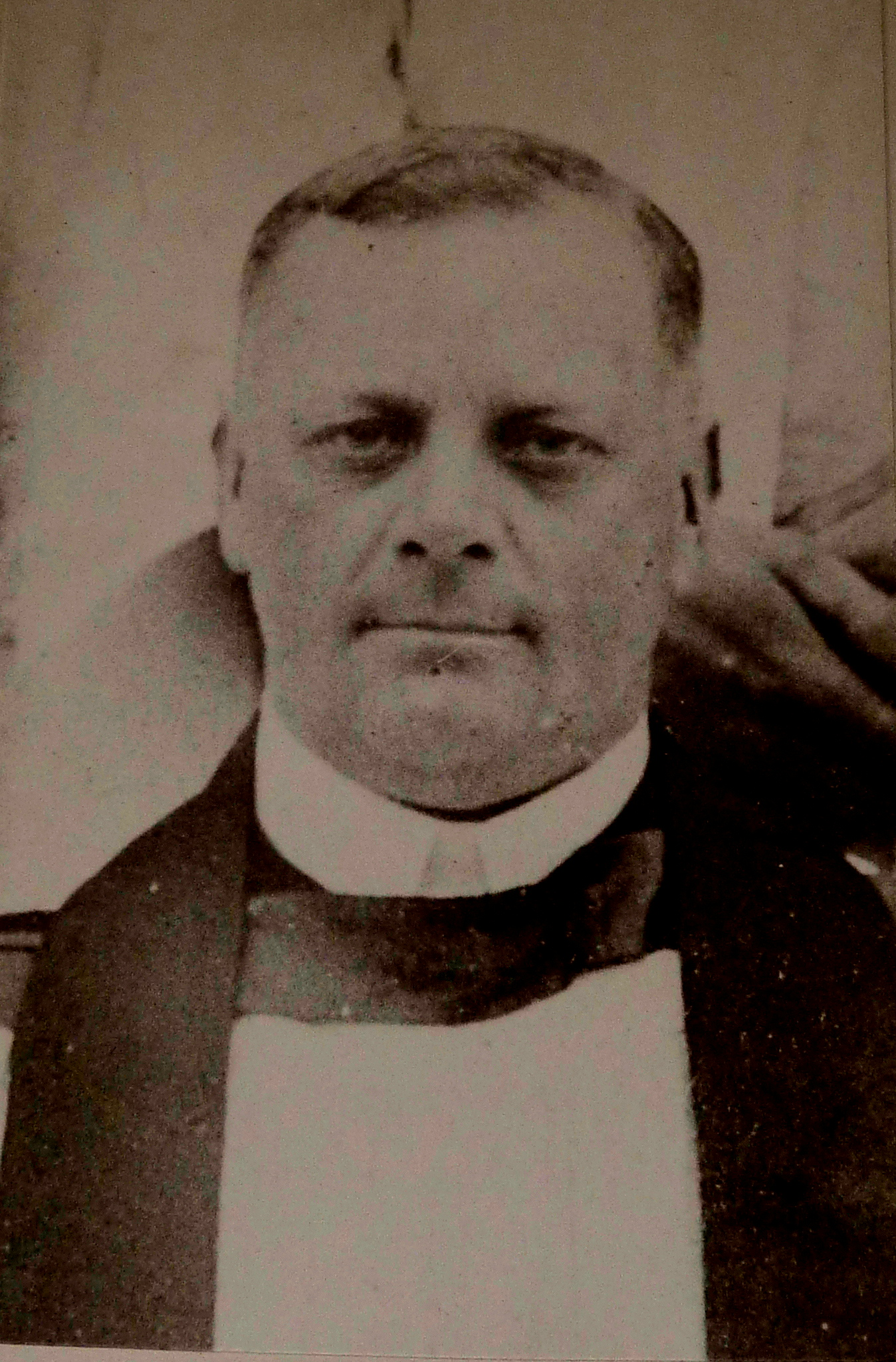
Rev. W.C. Gosling

The first curate appointed specifically to this benefice was Charles Oldroyd (1859–1806), who served from January 1896 to April 1898, then went on to the Church of St Philip and St James in Scholes, Cleckheaton. Oldroyd died in Somerset in 1906 at the age of 46.

Oldroyd was followed in January 1899 by Walter Charles Gosling (1869–1952), who stayed until November 1908. Gosling attended Merton College, Oxford, attaining his BA in 1894, and his MA in 1897; he was ordained priest at Ripon in the same year. He had been chaplain of the Church of St John the Evangelist at Oulton from 1896 to 1898.

Next came Thomas Hadfield (b. 1857), who officiated from October 1910 until March 1912. The last curate to be appointed before World War I was Charles David Day (b.1885), serving from June 1912 to June 1914. During the war it was William Lesswaine Brambston (1875–1959) from July 1915 to June 1920.

There were five curates between the wars, beginning with Robert Clement Owen (b.1884) from May 1921 until July 1925; he spoke both English and Welsh. Then it was George Goode, December 1925 to September 1929. After him came the youthful James Albert Kings (1906–1987), serving under the economically devastating conditions of the Great Depression from June 1930 to April 1934. Fred Herrington carried on this work from December 1934 to November 1937.

It was Philip Melville Berry (1915–1962) who was in office when World War II started. He served from September 1938 to June 1942 when Ronald Ernest Helm took over as curate.

== Services and events ==
As of 2014 the curate is Canon Ian Michael Gaskell who holds the Chapelthorpe benefice. There is a Sunday communion service with hymns and sermon. There used to be after-service refreshments served in the church hall next door, but that building, which used to be hired out for events, was pulled down in 2014.

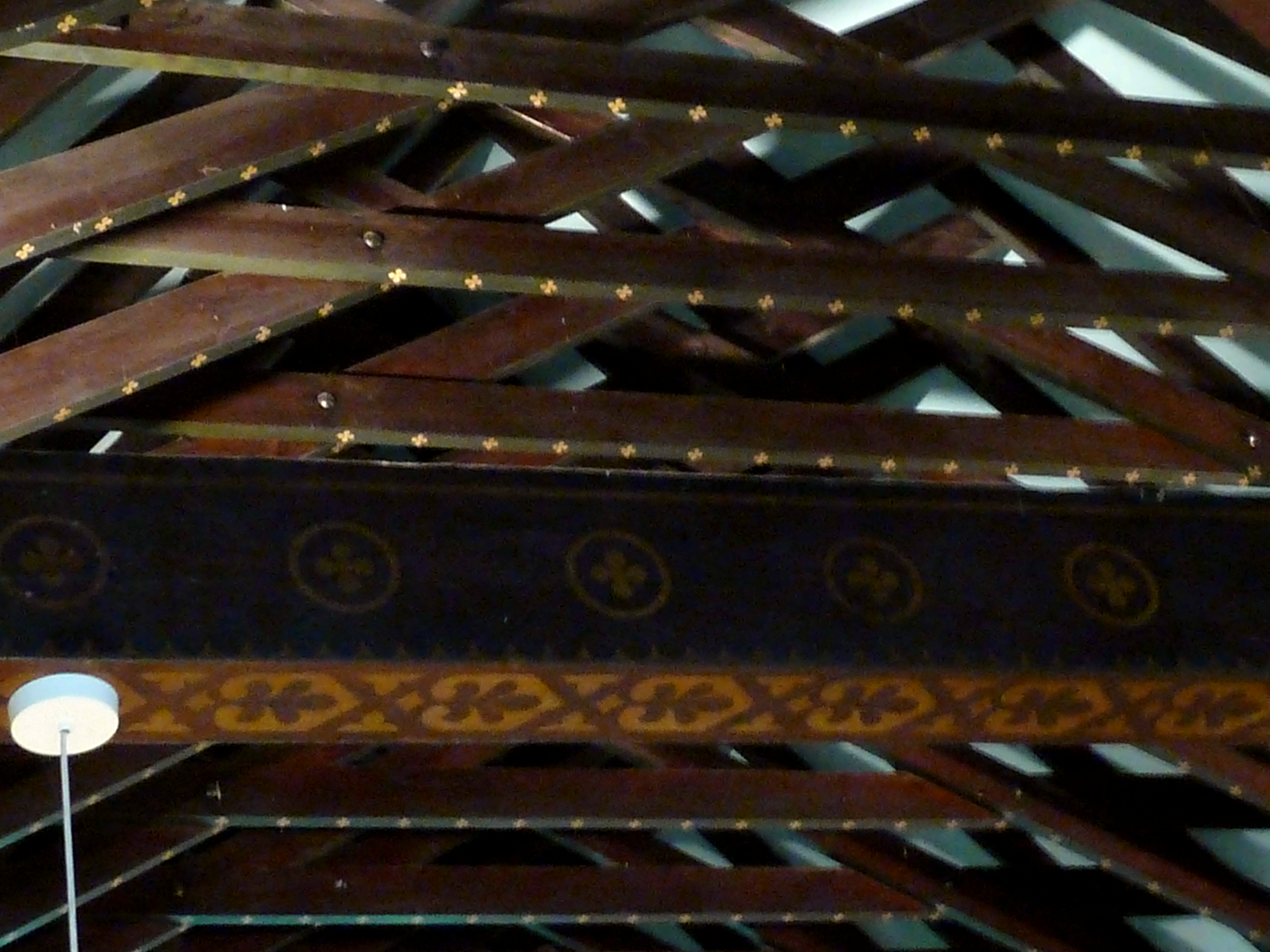
The original 1892 scissor-braced and painted chancel roof

== See also ==
- Listed buildings in Crigglestone

== Bibliography ==
- Felstead, Alison; Franklin, Jonathan; Pinfield, Leslie, eds. (1993). Directory of British Architects: 1834–1900. British Architectural Library: Mansell Pub. ISBN 9780720121582.
