= Pailthorpe =

Pailthorpe is a surname. Notable people with the surname include:

- Duncan Pailthorpe (1890–1971), English first-class cricketer, medical doctor, and an officer in the British Army
- Grace Pailthorpe (1883–1971), British surrealist painter, surgeon, and psychology researcher

== See also ==
- Painthorpe, area in the district of Wakefield in West Yorkshire
