= Listed buildings in Crigglestone =

Crigglestone is a civil parish in the metropolitan borough of the City of Wakefield, West Yorkshire, England. The parish contains 20 listed buildings that are recorded in the National Heritage List for England. Of these, one is listed at Grade II*, the middle of the three grades, and the others are at Grade II, the lowest grade. The parish is mainly residential, and most of the listed buildings are houses, farmhouses and farm buildings. The other listed buildings consist of two churches, a former corn mill, and a milestone.

== Key ==
Grade	Criteria
II*	Particularly important buildings of more than special interest
II	Buildings of national importance and special interest

== Buildings ==
Name and location	Photograph	Date	Notes	Grade
The Old Cottage; 53.63536°N 1.51441°W		Early 16th century	A timber framed hall house later encased in stone, with cross-wings added in the 17th century, giving an H-shaped plan. It has a stone slate roof with coped gables and bases for finials, and there are two storeys. In the centre of the hall range is a doorway converted into a window. The wings are on plinths, and have hood moulds, and doorways with composite jambs and chamfered surrounds. The windows are mullioned, with some mullions missing.	II
Boyne Hill Farmhouse; 53.63537°N 1.51370°W	—	16th century (possible)	The farmhouse was later extended. The early parts have a ground floor in gritstone, and brick encasing earlier timber framing in the upper floor, the later parts are in stone, and the roof is in stone slate. There are two storeys, the earlier part has three bays, the later part has two bays, and there is a two-bay rear wing. The doorways have monolithic jambs, some windows are mullioned, there is a tall stair window, and at the rear is a canted bay window with a sash window above.	II
Durkar Hall Farm Barn and Stable; 53.65020°N 1.52281°W	—	Mid 16th century	The barn is partly timber framed and partly in brick, with a stone slate roof. There are five bays and aisles, and the openings include cart entries, rectangular vents, and a blocked doorway with composite jambs. Attached to the right is a stable in brick.	II
Humley Cottages; 53.63714°N 1.50566°W	—	Mid 16th century	A house, later divided, it is timber framed, and was encased in stone in the 17th century. The hipped roof is in stone slate and tiles, there is one storey, and a rear aisle with a catslide roof. On the front is a canted bay window with mullioned windows, flanked by inserted windows.	II
17, 19 and 21, Mill Farm Drive; 53.63906°N 1.50023°W	—	Early 17th century	The house was later extended; the later main range is at right angles and dates from the 18th century. The house is in stone with stone slate roofs, coped gables with kneelers, and two storeys. The main range has four bays, and a two-bay rear wing with an outshut. On the front is a doorway with an architrave and a fanlight, at the rear is a doorway with monolithic jambs and a fanlight, and the windows are sashes. The older range is partly without a roof, and it contains a full-height canted bay window, mullioned windows, quoins, a doorway with composite jambs, and a blocked Tudor arched doorway.	II
Barn northeast of Blacker Hall Farmhouse; 53.63802°N 1.54701°W	—	Early to mid 17th century	A stone barn with quoins, and a stone slate roof with coped gables and shaped kneelers. There are two storeys, five bays and an aisle. In the centre is a cart entry, a porch with a mullioned window, and a doorway with composite jambs and a quoined chamfered lintel. A flight of steps lead up to an upper floor doorway. At the rear is a tall cart entry and square vents.	II
Malt house southwest of Blacker Hall Farmhouse; 53.63745°N 1.54745°W	—	Early to mid 17th century	The malt house is in stone with quoins and a stone slate roof. There are two storeys, seven bays, a single-bay outshut on the left and a gabled kiln on the right. On the front is a doorway with a chamfered surround and a Tudor arch, mullioned windows, and external steps leading up to a doorway with tie-stone jambs. At the rear is a taking-in door, and the kiln has a partly rendered gable and a pantile roof.	II*
Chapelthorpe Hall; 53.63793°N 1.51851°W	—	17th century	The house, later used for other purposes, was largely rebuilt in the 18th century and a large extension was added to the north in 1847. The house is in stone with hipped stone slate roofs, and has two storeys. The earlier south front has a plinth, a sill band, and an eaves cornice. It is symmetrical with seven bays, and a Tuscan porch. The windows are sashes, those in the ground floor with architraves, friezes and cornices, and those in the upper floor with plain surrounds. The north front has five bays, a chamfered plinth, rusticated quoins, a sill band, a frieze, and an eaves cornice. The middle bay projects slightly under a pediment and contains a doorway with an architrave, a pulvinated frieze, and a cornice on consoles.	II
Barn southeast of Blacker Hall Farmhouse; 53.63764°N 1.54679°W	—	1635 (or 1685)	A stone barn with quoins, and a roof of Welsh blue slate at the front and stone slate at the rear, with coped gables and shaped kneelers. There are five bays and a rear aisle. The barn contains a cart entry with tie-stone jambs, a pitching hole above, a taking-in door with a chamfered surround, and square vents.	II
70 and 72 Slack Lane; 53.63999°N 1.50347°W	—	1683	A house, later divided, in stone, with quoins, and a stone slate roof with coped gables and kneelers. There are two storeys, a double-depth plan, and two bays. In the left bay is a Tudor arched doorway with composite jambs and a chamfered surround, and a mullioned window, both under a hood mould. To the right is an inserted doorway and a window with a hood mould, and in the upper floor are two-light windows.	II
421 Denby Dale Road; 53.65094°N 1.52348°W	—	Late 17th or early 18th century	A former farmhouse in brick with a stone slate roof. There is an L-shaped plan, consisting of a main range with two storeys and three bays, and a single-storey rear wing on the right. The windows in the upper floor are sliding sashes, and in the ground floor they have been altered to casements.	II
Hollingthorpe Farmhouse; 53.63216°N 1.52877°W	—	1725	The farmhouse is in stone on a plinth, with quoins, bands, and a stone slate roof with coped gables and kneelers. There are two storeys, a cellar and attic, and a symmetrical front of five bays. The central doorway has an architrave, an entablature, a keystone, and a cornice, and above is a window with a similar surround and an apron. The other windows are mullioned with two lights and plain surrounds. At the rear is a doorway with composite jambs, a chamfered surround, and a decorated dated lintel, a stair window, and a five-light cellar window.	II
Former barn and dovecote 53.63931°N 1.49989°W	—	Early 18th century	The barn and attached dovecote are in stone with a stone slate roof. The barn has six bays, and contains a segmental-arched cart entry with a chamfered surround and composite jambs. The attached dovecote has three bays and contains a central doorway with composite jambs, and a mullioned window.	II
Hall Croft; 53.63408°N 1.51755°W	—	Mid 18th century	A rectory, later a private house, the older part is the kitchen wing, with the main part of the house added at right angles in the 19th century. It is in stone on a plinth, with a stone slate roof. There are two storeys and a cellar, a symmetrical front of three bays, a right outshut, and a rear gabled wing with quoined angles. The doorway is approached by steps and has an architrave, the windows are sashes, and above the outshut is a stair window.	II
St James' Church, Chapelthorpe; 53.63819°N 1.51777°W		c. 1771	The chancel was added in 1882–83 by William Swinden Barber. The church was badly damaged by fire in 1951 and rebuilt as a replica, re-using the original walls. It is built in stone with a stone slate roof, and is in Classical style. The entrance front has three bays, a pedimented gable, and two doorways, each with an architrave, voussoirs, a pulvinated frieze, consoles, and a triangular pediment, set in a semicircular-arched recess. The gable is coped, with a quatrefoil in the apex, and surmounted by an open drum with an ogee cap on Tuscan columns. At the other end is a Venetian window and an open pedimented gable. On the sides are windows with semicircular heads and architraves.	II
Blacker Hall Farmhouse; 53.63771°N 1.54715°W	—	c. 1800	The farmhouse is in stone, and has a stone slate roof with coped gables and shaped kneelers. There are two storeys, and a T-shaped plan, with a symmetrical front of three bays and a rear wing. The central doorway has monolithic jambs and a fanlight, and the windows are sashes. In the rear wing is a tall stair window and a lean-to.	II
Wheelhouse Restaurant; 53.63801°N 1.49913°W		c. 1800	A corn mill, later used for other purposes, it is in stone with quoins, and a pyramidal stone slate roof. There are two storeys, a symmetrical front of five bays, and sides of three bays. The central doorway has jambs with upper and lower tie stones and a monolithic lintel, and the windows are sashes.	II
House west of Chapelthorpe Hall; 53.63777°N 1.51900°W	—	c. 1847	A stone house on a plinth, with quoins, a sill band, and a hipped stone slate roof. There are two storeys and a symmetrical front of three bays. The doorway has monolithic jambs and a fanlight. The windows in the upper floor are upper casements, and elsewhere they are sashes.	II
Milestone; 53.63889°N 1.54798°W		Mid 19th century	The milestone is on the east side of the road north of the junction of Branch Road with Denby Dale Road (A636 road). It is in stone with a triangular section and a round head, and has cast iron overlay. On the top is inscribed "WAKEFIELD & DENBYDALE ROAD" and "CRIGGLESTONE", and on the sides are the distances to Denby Dale and Wakefield.	II
St John's Church, Calder Grove; 53.64754°N 1.53572°W		1892–93	The church was designed by William Swinden Barber in Early English style. It is built in sandstone with a slate roof and clay ridge tiles. The church consists of a nave and a chancel under a single roof, a north porch and a combined vestry and organ chamber on the south. On the west gable end is a gabled bellcote, and the windows are lancets.	II
