= Peter Broughton =

English cricketer

Personal information
- Full name: Peter Norman Broughton
- Born: 22 October 1935 (age 91); Castleford, Yorkshire, England
- Batting: Right-handed
- Bowling: Right-arm fast-medium

Domestic team information
- Years: Team
- 1956: Yorkshire
- 1960–1962: Leicestershire

Career statistics
Competition	First-class
Matches	30
Runs scored	162
Batting average	10.12
100s/50s	0/0
Top score	17*
Balls bowled	4950
Wickets	85
Bowling average	28.58
5 wickets in innings	5
10 wickets in match	0
Best bowling	6/38
Catches/stumpings	12/0
- Source: Cricinfo, 3 January 2016

Peter Norman Broughton (born 22 October 1935, in Castleford, Yorkshire, England) is a former English first-class cricketer, who played six matches for Yorkshire in 1956 and 24 for Leicestershire from 1960 to 1962.

Broughton was a right-arm fast-medium bowler, who took 85 wickets at 28.58 with a best of 6 for 38 in his third match for Yorkshire, against Somerset in 1956. He scored 162 runs at 10.12 with a best of 17 not out.

He played his early cricket with Castleford C.C. and represented Yorkshire 2nd XI from 1954 to 1957. He went on to be a professional at Idle C.C. in 1957 and 1958, taking 56 wickets at 11.87 in the latter year, and was with Leeds C.C. in 1959. He represented Cumberland in Minor Counties cricket from 1963 to 1969.

In 1980 he was the landlord of a public house in Newmillerdam, Wakefield.
