= Newmillerdam =

Village in West Yorkshire, England

Coordinates: 53.638°N 1.497°W

- Village
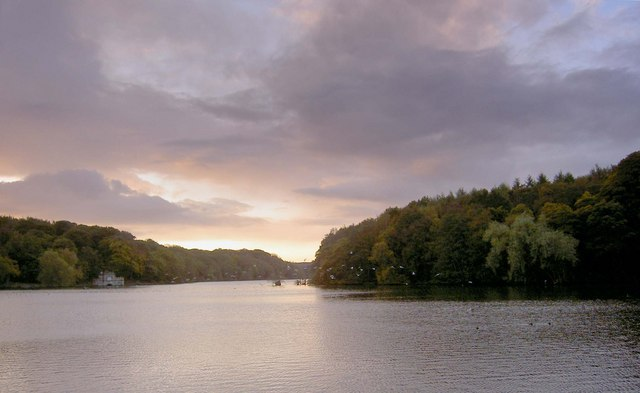
- Newmiller Dam

- Location within West Yorkshire
- OS grid reference: SE331156
- Civil parish: Crigglestone
- Metropolitan borough: City of Wakefield
- Metropolitan county: West Yorkshire
- Region: Yorkshire and the Humber
- Country: England
- Sovereign state: United Kingdom
- Post town: WAKEFIELD
- Postcode district: WF
- Dialling code: 01924
- Police: West Yorkshire
- Fire: West Yorkshire
- Ambulance: Yorkshire

Newmillerdam is a village and suburb of Wakefield, in West Yorkshire, England. The name refers to the lake and country park adjacent to the village, though the dam itself is often labelled as Newmiller Dam. The park is a local nature reserve. It is in the civil parish of Crigglestone. The village is situated on the A61 road, about 4 miles (6.4 km) south of Wakefield.

== History ==
Formerly known as Thurstonhaugh, the village is currently named from the construction of a corn mill powered by water from the dammed lake, and thus it is called the new mill on the dam, a name which dates back to the 15th century. Historically, the settlement was part of the Sandal Magna township, and belonged to the wapentake of Agbrigg. Today it is part of Wakefield, and is in the civil parish of Crigglestone. The mill building still stands, although it is non-operational and is grade II listed. The mill was originally owned and operated by the Pashley family, who lived in the village until the 1980s. The Pashleys owned many local businesses during the centuries, which included blacksmiths, coal mines and a furniture making business. These furniture makers were also general carpenters and installed one of the first public toilets in the yard of The Three Houses Public House in 1852.

The body of water known as Newmiller Dam was created by damming up Bleakley Dyke and Bushcliff Beck in the 15th century; although the corn mill was first recorded in 1306, the settlement was always the new mill at Thurstonhaugh until 1469, when the manor court rolls stated the place to be New Mill on the dam. The dam covers an area of 10 hectares (25 acres) with an average depth of 3.3 metres (11 ft), and drains an area of 2,880 hectares (7,100 acres).

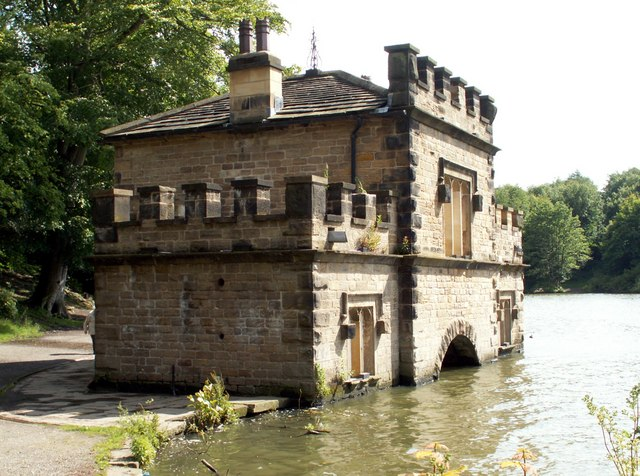
The boathouse in Newmillerdam

Chevet Hall was a mansion that stood on the site of an older hall to the east of Newmillerdam and was built in 1529 by the Neviles. The hall was demolished as a result of mining subsidence in the 1960s, despite a massive outcry from locals. In 1765, the hall and estate was acquired by the Pilkingtons; in 1820, they built the boathouse on the lake on their private grounds. The Pilkingtons built lodges around their 2,340 acres (9.5 km^{2}) private estate to deter poachers; some of them survived. It was opened to the public after Wakefield Council bought the estate in 1954. The boathouse is a Grade II listed building and incoprtaes some of the stone from the Chantry Bridge at Wakefield after its restoration in 1820.

There was a Newmillerdam Colliery, on the road westwards to the village of Hall Green; it was closed in 1981 upon an agreement that the miners could transfer to a newer drift mine being developed nearby.

Seckar Woods nature reserve, located near the more affluent village of Woolley, is an SSSI (Site of Special Scientific Interest).

== Notable people ==
- Peter Broughton, former cricketer, ran a pub in the village in the 1980s
- John Lonsdale, clergyman, was born in the village
- Caroline Norton, poet, lived in the village
