= Crigglestone =

Village and civil parish in West Yorkshire, England

Coordinates: 53.6440°N 1.5225°W

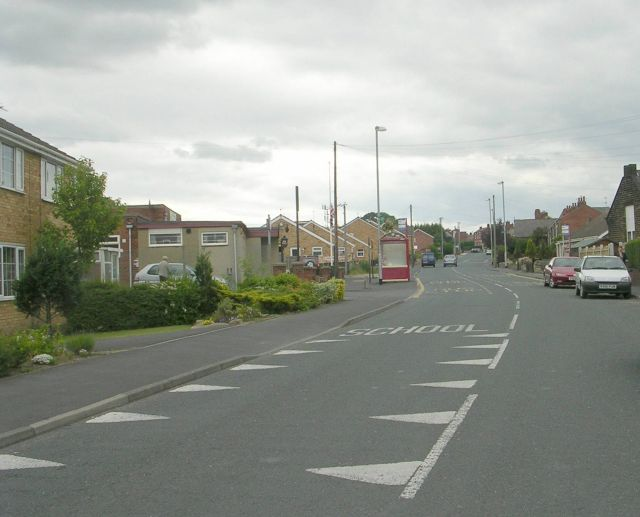
- High Street

- Location within West Yorkshire
- Population: 9,271 (2011)
- OS grid reference: SE316164
- Civil parish: Crigglestone
- Metropolitan borough: City of Wakefield
- Metropolitan county: West Yorkshire
- Region: Yorkshire and the Humber
- Country: England
- Sovereign state: United Kingdom
- Post town: WAKEFIELD
- Postcode district: WF4
- Dialling code: 01924
- Police: West Yorkshire
- Fire: West Yorkshire
- Ambulance: Yorkshire
- UK Parliament: Ossett and Denby Dale

Crigglestone is a village and civil parish in the City of Wakefield in West Yorkshire, England. It is recorded as "Crigeston" (along with neighbouring "Orberie") in the Domesday Book. The civil parish had a population of 9,271 at the 2011 Census. On 29 July 1941, an explosion occurred at the Crigglestone Colliery, killing 21 men. Since the 1970s, the site of the colliery has become an industrial estate on the western side, giving way to residential housing on the eastern side and a public amenity (Betty Eastwood Park) to the south.

The name Crigglestone derives from the Primitive Welsh crūg meaning 'hill' and the Old English hylltūn meaning 'settlement on a hill'.

This area has two Anglican churches: the Church of St James, Chapelthorpe, and the Church of St John the Divine, Calder Grove.

Crigglestone once had two railway stations, both of which are now closed. Crigglestone West was on the line between Sheffield and Leeds via Wakefield, Crigglestone East on the closed and lifted line between Thornhill and Royston Junction. It is situated about 4 miles (6.4 km) south-west of Wakefield, and 10 miles (16 km) north of Barnsley.

== See also ==
- Listed buildings in Crigglestone
- Newmillerdam, part of the civil parish
- Horbury
- Crofton, West Yorkshire
