= Painthorpe =

Coordinates: 53.637565°N 1.528215°W

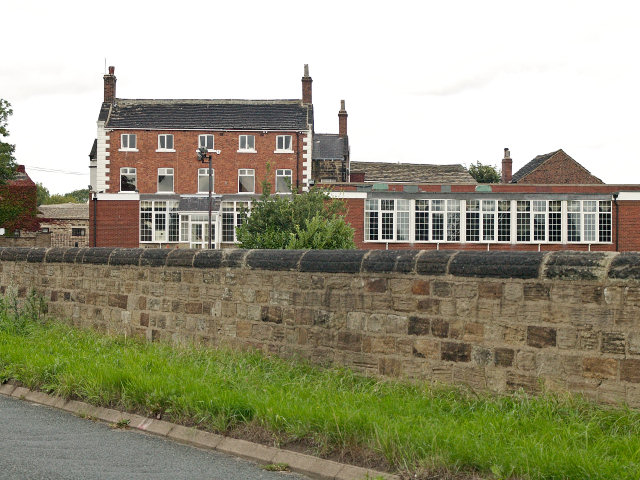
Painthorpe Country Club

Painthorpe is a residential area in the Wakefield district, in the English county of West Yorkshire. It is situated southwest of Crigglestone.

== Amenities ==
Painthorpe has a primary school which it is proposed will amalgamate with Kettlethorpe High School in 2018.
