= Thwaites railway station =

Disused railway station in West Yorkshire, England

Thwaites
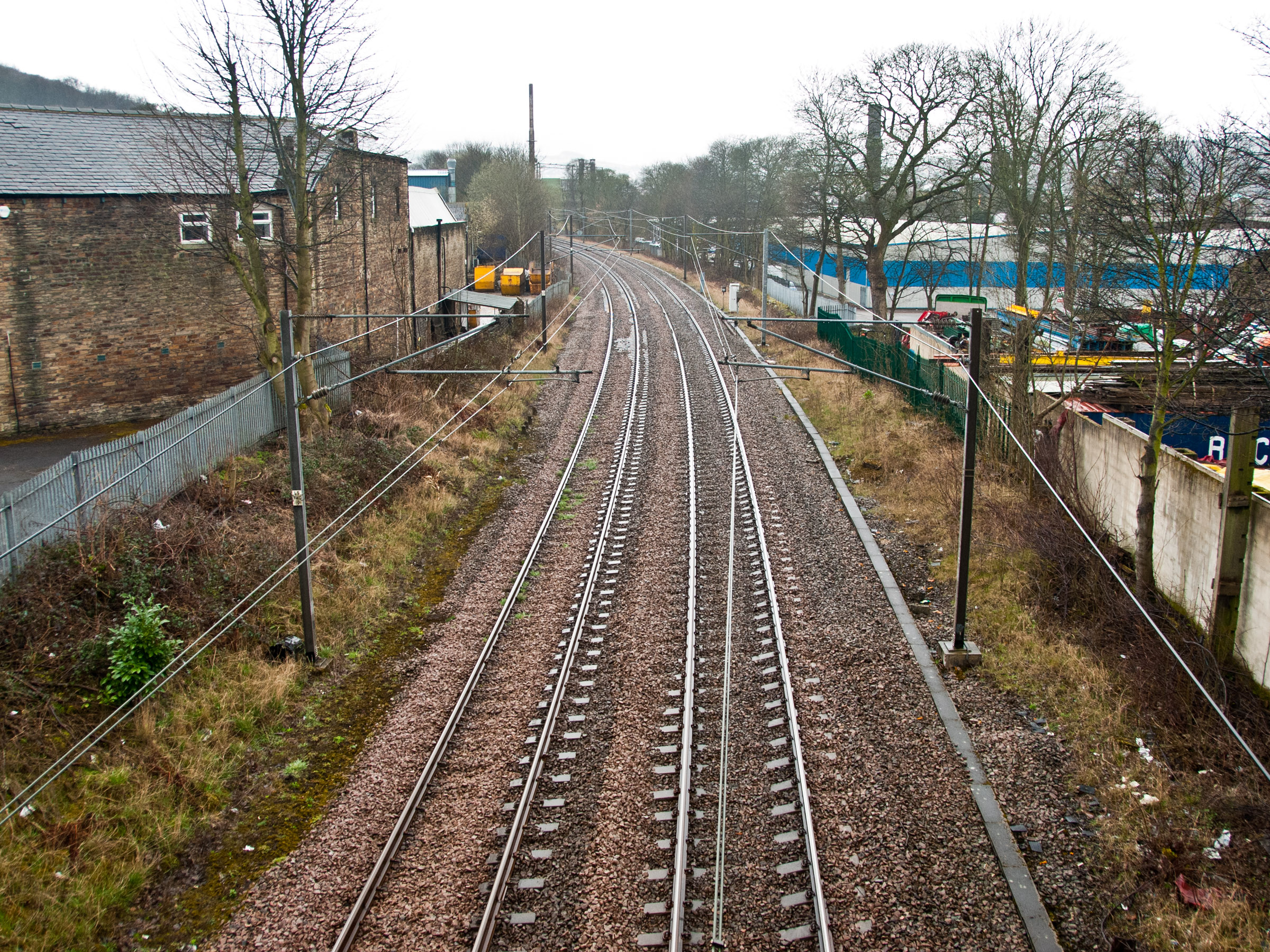
- Site of Thwaites railway station

General information
- Location: Keighley, City of Bradford, West Riding of Yorkshire; England
- Coordinates: 53.8687°N 1.8872°W
- Grid reference: SE075413
- Platforms: 2

Other information
- Status: Disused

History
- Original company: Midland Railway

Key dates
- 1 June 1892: Station opened
- 1 July 1909: Station closed
Location

Thwaites railway station was located just east of Keighley, West Riding of Yorkshire, England; it was a stop on the Midland Railway line through the Aire Valley between Keighley and Shipley. It opened to traffic in 1892 and closed 17 years later in 1909, due to poor patronage.

== History ==
The Leeds and Bradford Extension Railway (L&BER) opened up from Shipley to Keighley in 1847. By 1846, amalgamations had seen the L&BER become part of the Midland Railway (MR) The population centres in the Aire Valley were served by the line at Shipley, Bingley and Keighley. Demands from local people that the MR build a station at Crossflatts went unheeded, but they did build a station at Thwaites, a suburb in the eastern part of Keighley.

The station opened in 1892 during a period of improvements on the line; Bingley railway station was resited in 1892 and the widening of the line between Bingley and Thwaites Junction was started at that time. Thwaites railway station was only open for a mere 17 years before it was closed by the Midland Railway in 1909. The station was a small concern being able to handle only passenger and parcels traffic; no goods sidings were installed at the station, although just east of the station was the Keighley Gas Works and Thwaites Junction, where the line ran along a quadruple track section to the outskirts of Bingley railway station.

Falling passenger numbers and dwindling income led the MR to close the station. In the Bradshaw timetable for 1896, only two trains per day stopped at the station. The MR had hoped that the Keighley Tramway would be extended to Thwaites, so a station was deemed to no longer be necessary. The tramway never extended into Thwaites itself, and the tram system was abolished in Keighley by 1925. Thereafter, buses from Keighley ran past the site.

| Preceding station | Historical railways | Following station |
|---|---|---|
| Keighley; Line and station open | Midland Railway; Leeds and Bradford Extension Railway | Bingley; Line and station open |
