= Bingley railway station =

Railway station in West Yorkshire, England

Bingley
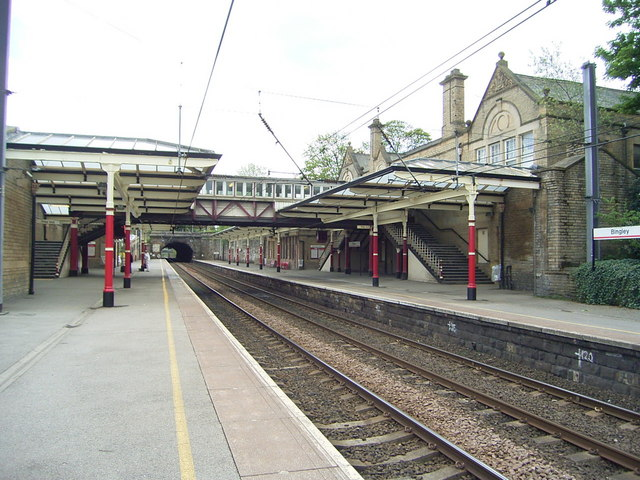

General information
- Location: Bingley, City of Bradford; England
- Coordinates: 53.8487°N 1.8372°W
- Grid reference: SE108391
- Manager: Northern Trains
- Transit authority: West Yorkshire (Metro)
- Platforms: 2

Other information
- Station code: BIY
- Fare zone: 3
- Classification: DfT category D

Key dates
- 1847: Original station opened
- 1892: Present station opened

Passengers
- 2021/22: ▲0.807 million
- 2022/23: ▲0.920 million
- 2023/24: ▲0.939 million
- 2024/25: ▲1.018 million
- 2025/26: ▲1.068 million

Listed Building – Grade II
- Feature: Bingley Station
- Designated: 15 April 2019
- Reference no.: 1460848
Location
Notes
- Passenger statistics from the Office of Rail and Road

Bingley is a grade II listed railway station that serves the market town of Bingley in West Yorkshire, England. It is located 13.5 miles (21.7 km) from Leeds and 5.5 miles (8.9 km) away from Bradford Forster Square, on the Airedale line; services are operated by Northern Trains.

== History ==
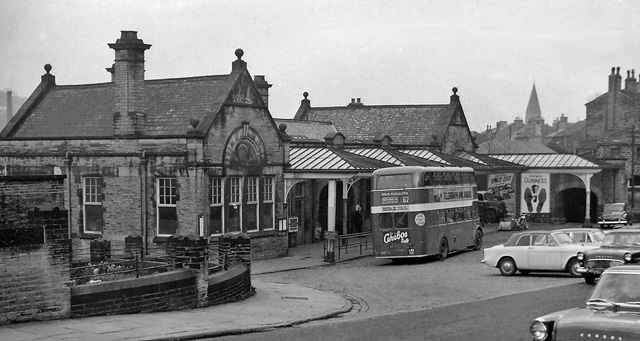
Bingley station in 1961

The Leeds and Bradford Railway opened the Leeds and Bradford Extension Railway from Shipley to Keighley on 16 March 1847. Bingley station opened on the first day and remained the only intermediate station until Saltaire was built in 1856.

The original station was near the Three Rise Locks on the Leeds and Liverpool Canal, but the Midland Railway (who had absorbed the L&BR in 1851) closed the old station and opened the current station on 24 July 1892. The second station was designed by Charles Trubshaw, who was a Midland Railway architect. The goods yard and accompanying shed were located to the north of the station, on the down side of the running lines. The shed, which is now in private hands, was taken out of railway use in 1965 and, like the station, is now grade II listed.

The bog north of Bingley station was a headache to the railway builders. It is recorded in the Bradford Observer of 8 March 1847 that "no fewer than 100,000 cubic yards of solid earth and stone have been poured into this insatiable maw of a bog." The bog has also claimed some of Bingley Grammar School's buildings and the sinking may have given rise to an urban legend about a locomotive and wagons having been swallowed up by the bog. No evidence can be found to attest to this.

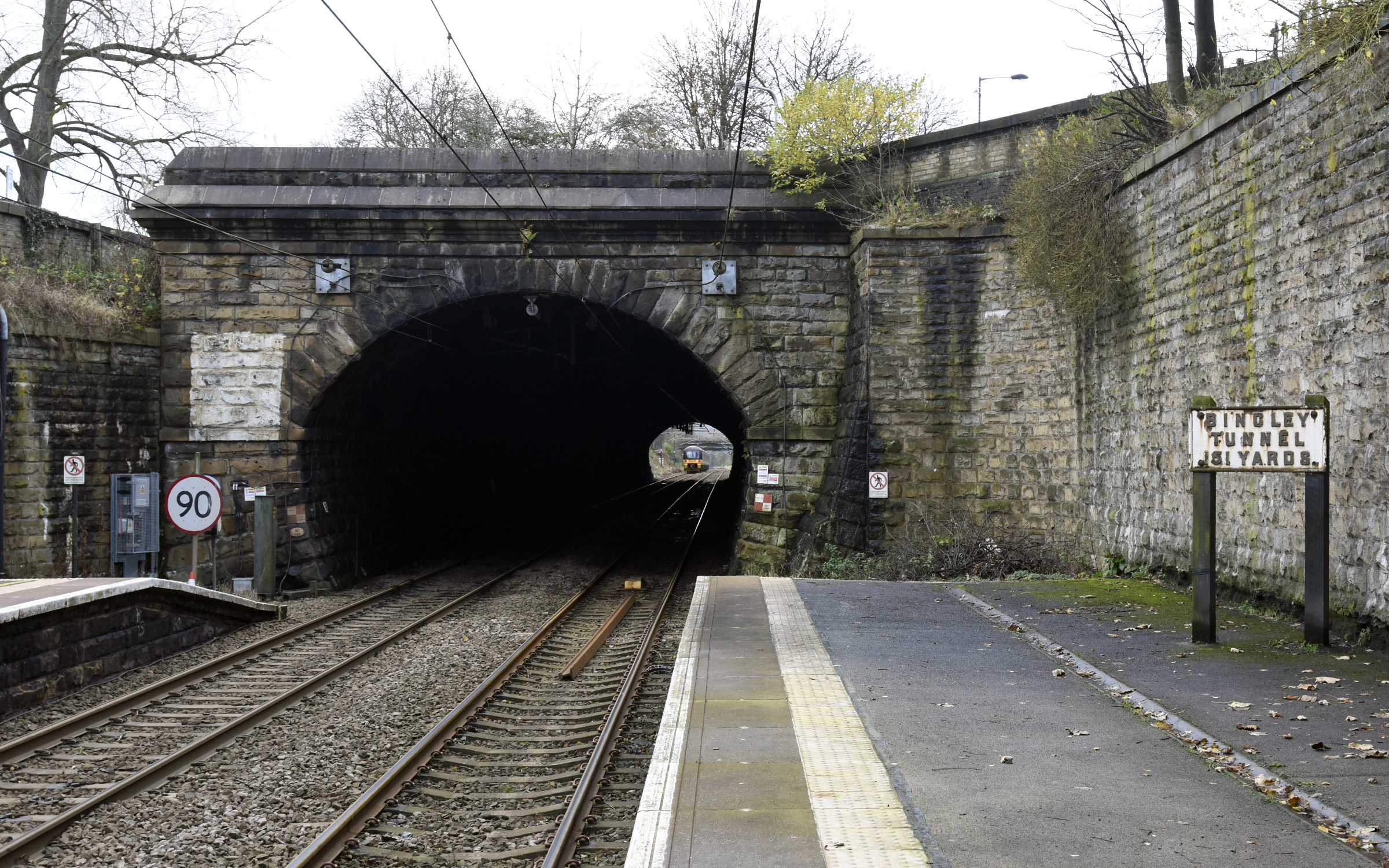
Bingley Tunnel (151 yards) and semaphore painted square; looking south

Immediately south of the station is Bingley Tunnel (151 yards (138 m) long) against which a semaphore signal was placed for movements towards Shipley. When the line was electrified in 1994, the semaphore signalling was replaced with colour lights at the same time. The tunnel mouth at Bingley had a painted white patch on it directly behind the semaphore arm, thereby allowing greater recognition for drivers of the signal's position.

== Accidents ==
A report in the Lancashire Gazette in 1847 states that a freight train from Leeds to Lancaster went through the station at 20 miles per hour (32 km/h) and hit some stationary freight wagons on the main line. Three wagons were completely destroyed whilst a fourth wagon and the locomotive were badly damaged.

In 2013, an unoccupied car ended up on the line just south of Bingley station and was hit at 8:45 pm by a Leeds to Skipton service.

== Facilities ==
The station is staffed part-time (except evenings and Sundays) – the booking office is sited in the main entrance at street level and is linked to the platforms via ramps, footbridge and a lift. Ticket machines are also provided. There are waiting rooms on each platform, with passenger information screens and PA system offering train running information.

== Services ==
Bingley is served by the following routes, operated by Northern Trains:

Airedale line:

- On Mondays to Saturdays, there is a half-hourly service to Leeds and an hourly service to Bradford Forster Square, with three trains an hour to Skipton. The Bradford service increases to half-hourly during peak periods, when there is also an additional service per hour to Skipton.
- On Sundays, there is an hourly service to Leeds and to Bradford Forster Square, with two trains per hour in the other direction to Skipton.

Bentham / Settle & Carlisle lines:

- All trains between Leeds and Carlisle, Lancaster and Morecambe also stop at Bingley.

Preceding station	National Rail	Following station
Saltaire	Northern Trains; Airedale Line	Crossflatts
Shipley	Northern Trains; Settle-Carlisle Line	Keighley
	Historical railways	
Saltaire	Midland Railway; Leeds and Bradford Extension Railway	Thwaites

== See also ==
- Listed buildings in Bingley
