= Apperley Viaducts =

Railway viaducts in West Yorkshire, England

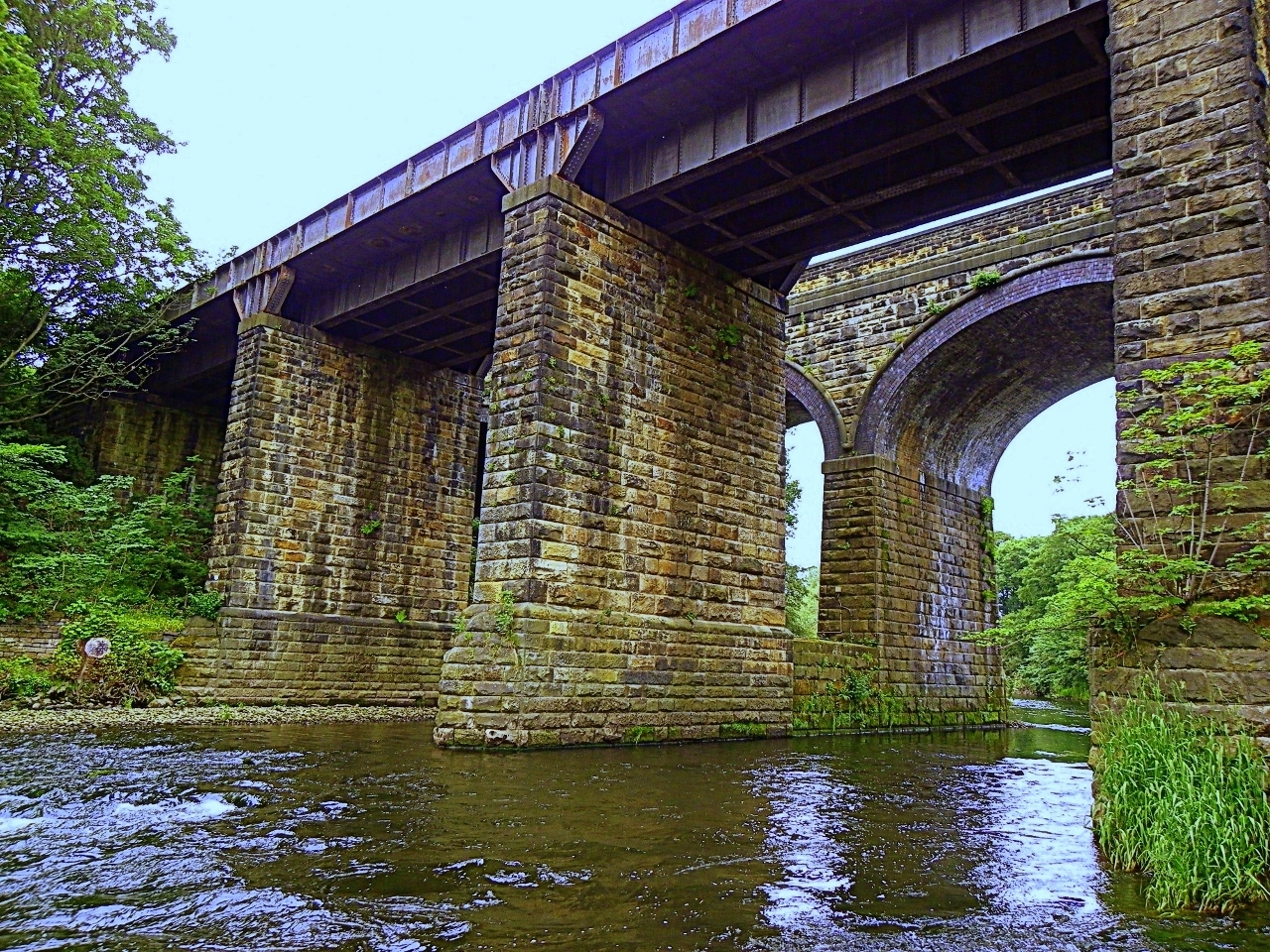
- Coordinates: 53.842°N 1.710°W
- Carries: Airedale line
- Crosses: River Aire
- Locale: Apperley Bridge, West Yorkshire, England

Characteristics
- Total length: 7 chains (460 ft; 140 m)
- No. of spans: 10

Rail characteristics
- No. of tracks: 2
- Track gauge: 4 ft 8 1/2 in (1,435 mm) standard gauge
- Electrified: Overhead catenary

History
- Opened: 1900

The Apperley Viaducts are two adjacent railway viaducts straddling the River Aire in West Yorkshire, England. The open viaduct dates back to 1900, carrying the current double track Airedale line railway, whereas the redundant adjacent viaduct (to the immediate west) dates back to 1867, and was built to replace the original bridge at this point which collapsed in November 1866 due to severe flooding. The viaducts are two of the many railway crossings of the River Aire between Shipley and Leeds.

== History ==
The first bridge over the Aire at this point was opened with the railway in May 1846, when the inaugural train stopped at the viaduct to inspect the earthworks. The first viaduct was 156 yards (143 m) long with ten arches, and carried up to 200 trains per day. Severe flooding in 1866 meant that instead of the river flowing through three arches, which it did normally, it was flooding through all ten arches of the viaduct by 16 November. This caused enough damage to the viaduct that it collapsed into the river in a matter of moments. The 4:50 pm train from Bradford Market Street railway station crossed the viaduct after 5 o'clock and the guard reported to the stationmaster at Apperley Bridge station that he felt the viaduct was "insecure". The signals were thrown to danger, and the station staff at Apperley Bridge station ran out to the viaduct to warn an approaching train - a 5:00 pm service from Bradford. However, it could not be stopped in time and it ran onto the viaduct, which sagged visibly with the weight of the train resting upon it, and the crew scrambled for the safety of the west of the viaduct, with the station staff from Apperley Bridge retreating to the east end of the viaduct. Barely had the respective parties reached either end of the viaduct, when a loud crack was heard, and both the viaduct and train dropped into the river.

A specialist locomotive recovery team had to wait for three days before they could get to the locomotive. The team inserted rails underneath the engine and used windlasses to retrieve the locomotive. It was then taken up an incline back onto the main running lines. The piers were rebuilt and new girders delivered, with traffic resuming across the new viaduct in early 1867. The girders were rolled from steel plates at an ironworks in Stanningley, and weighed over 500 tonnes (550 tons). The 1867 viaduct was designed and engineered by the team of Benton and Woodiwiss, who would go on to fulfil some of the contracts on the Settle and Carlisle Railway for the Midland Railway Company.

Initially, during the new build works, trains were terminated at Apperley Bridge and Shipley, with many through passengers being taken from Leeds to Bradford Adolphus Street, and walking through the city to Market Street (Forster Square station), before being taken onwards. By the 24 November, trains were terminating either side of the viaduct and passengers walked across the river on a wooden footbridge, some 4–5 yards (3.7–4.6 m) wide, which connected them between the trains rather than transferring across Bradford.

At the northern end of the eastern viaduct (the one still in use) was a small siding that led down to Esholt Sewage Farm. The current viaduct which is in use, was constructed between 1899 and 1900 when the lines between Leeds and Shipley were quadrupled with the lines and viaducts being parallel to each other, (the nearby Thackley Tunnel having another bore cut through the hill also). The viaduct is one of eight crossings over the River Aire by the railway line between Leeds and Shipley, and is 7 chains (460 ft; 140 m) long.

== See also ==
- Kirkstall Road Viaduct
- Thackley Tunnel
