= Airedale line =

Rail line in Yorkshire, England

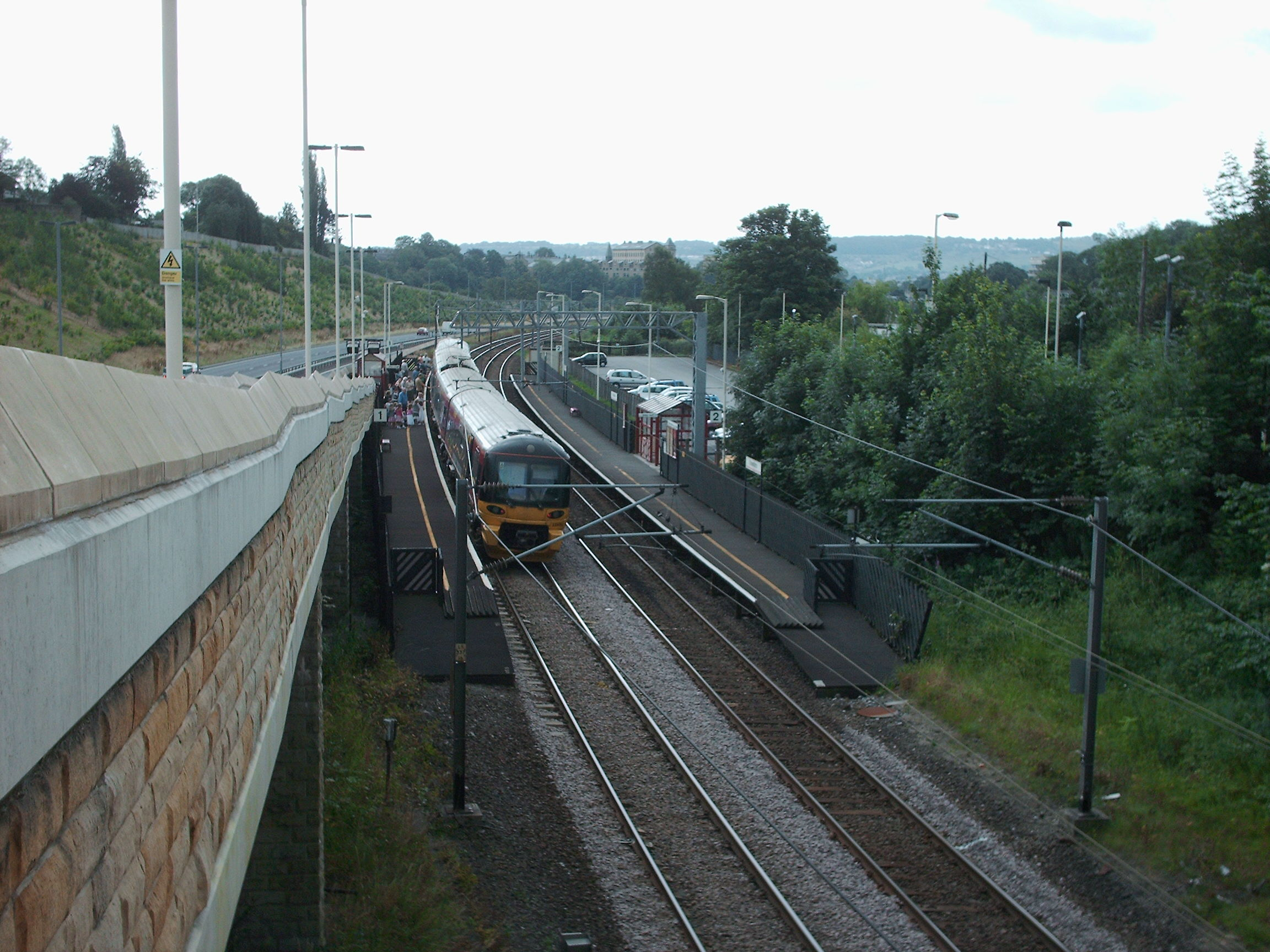
- Class 333 at Crossflatts in 2006

Overview
- Status: Open
- Owner: Network Rail
- Locale: West Yorkshire; Yorkshire and the Humber
- Termini: Leeds Bradford Forster Square; Skipton (some services continue to Carlisle or Lancaster)
- Stations: 11

Service
- Type: Commuter rail
- Operator(s): London North Eastern Railway, Northern
- Rolling stock: British Rail Class 333 (majority of services)

History
- Opened: 1846

Technical
- Num of tracks: 2
- Track gauge: 4 ft 8 1/2 in (1,435 mm) standard gauge
- Electrification: Overhead catenary
Route map
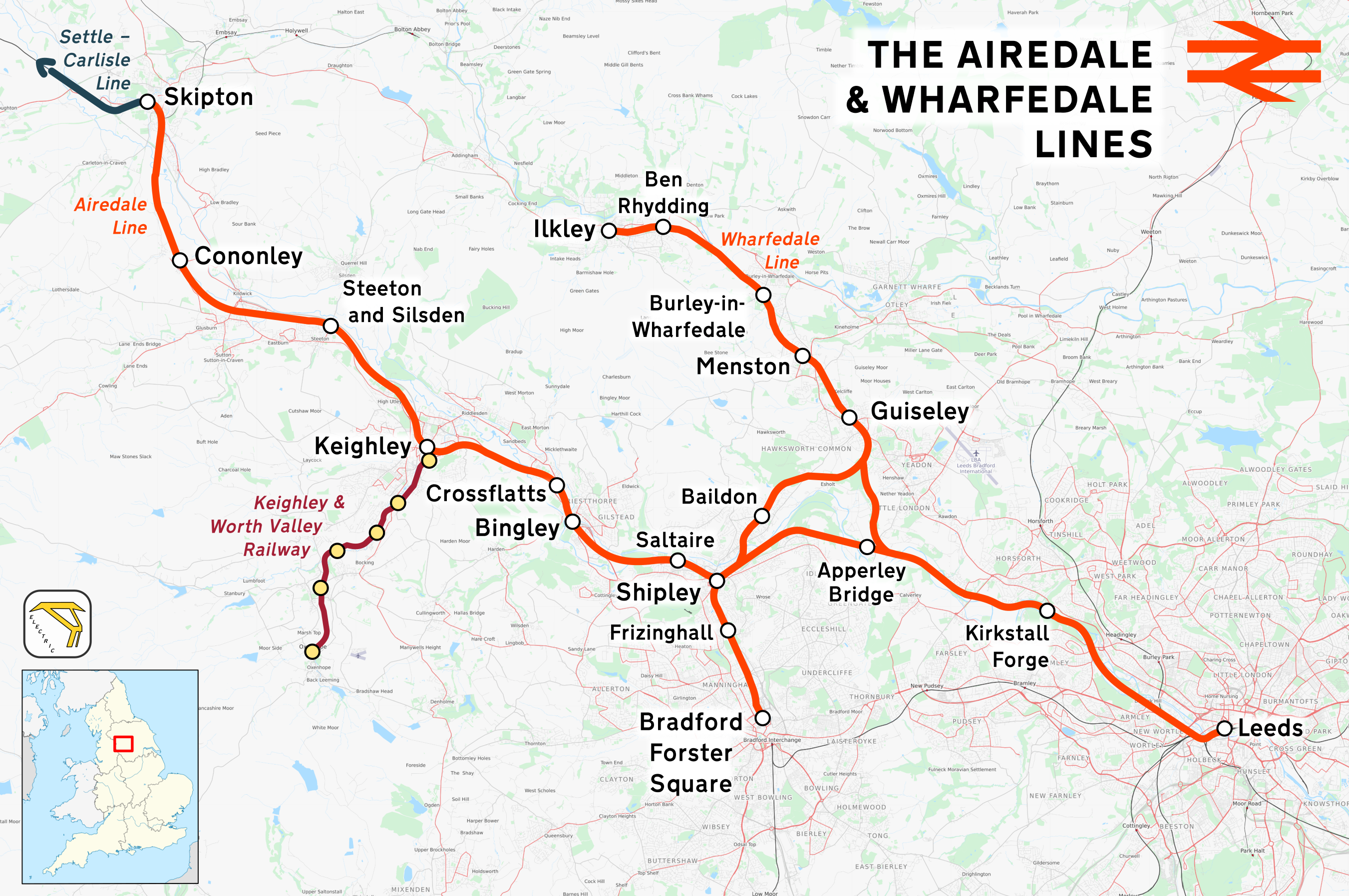
(Click to expand)

The Airedale line is one of the rail services in the West Yorkshire Metro area centred on West Yorkshire in northern England. The service is operated by Northern, on the route connecting Leeds and Bradford with Skipton. Some services along the line continue to Morecambe or Carlisle. The route covered by the service was historically part of the Midland Railway.

According to SELRAP, the Airedale line is the most heavily used passenger route outside the South East of England.

== The route and its history ==
The first section, between Leeds and Bradford (Forster Square station), was opened by the Leeds and Bradford Railway on 1 July 1846. A number of the intermediate stations were closed in March 1965 (as a result of the Beeching Axe), however the line and its major stations remained open. Some of the closed stations, such as Saltaire, were re-opened during the 1980s.

In 1994 under Regional Railways, the line was electrified at 25 kV AC overhead between Leeds and Skipton, and new British Rail Class 333 trains were introduced in the early 2000s. Investment in the line has seen passenger numbers grow, and now overcrowding on trains is a problem. New stock and longer trains were introduced by the former Northern franchise Arriva Rail North in 2019 to tackle this issue.

The route is described below. The line originally included a number of stations which are now closed:

- Leeds – the station was named Leeds (Wellington) to differentiate it from the other main line stations in the city, belonging to the North Eastern Railway (NER)
- Holbeck
- Armley Canal Road
- Kirkstall
- Kirkstall Forge
- Newlay and Horsforth
- Calverley and Rodley
  - Location of Apperley Junction for the Wharfedale line
- Apperley Bridge & Rawdon – closed in 1965; new Apperley Bridge station opened in 2015
  - Location of Apperley Viaducts
  - Location of Thackley Tunnel
- This is the location of the triangular junction for the branch line serving Shipley and Bradford Forster Square. The main line, which was opened from here to Skipton by the Leeds and Bradford Extension Railway in 1847, continues:
- Saltaire
  - Location of Bingley tunnel
- Bingley
- Crossflatts
- Thwaites
- Keighley
  - Location of the Worth Valley Branch junction to Oxenhope. The branch is now the Keighley and Worth Valley Railway heritage line.
- Steeton & Silsden
- Kildwick and Crosshills
- Cononley
- Skipton.

Trains of the Leeds–Morecambe line and Settle–Carlisle line also run along the Airedale line from Leeds.

== The line today ==
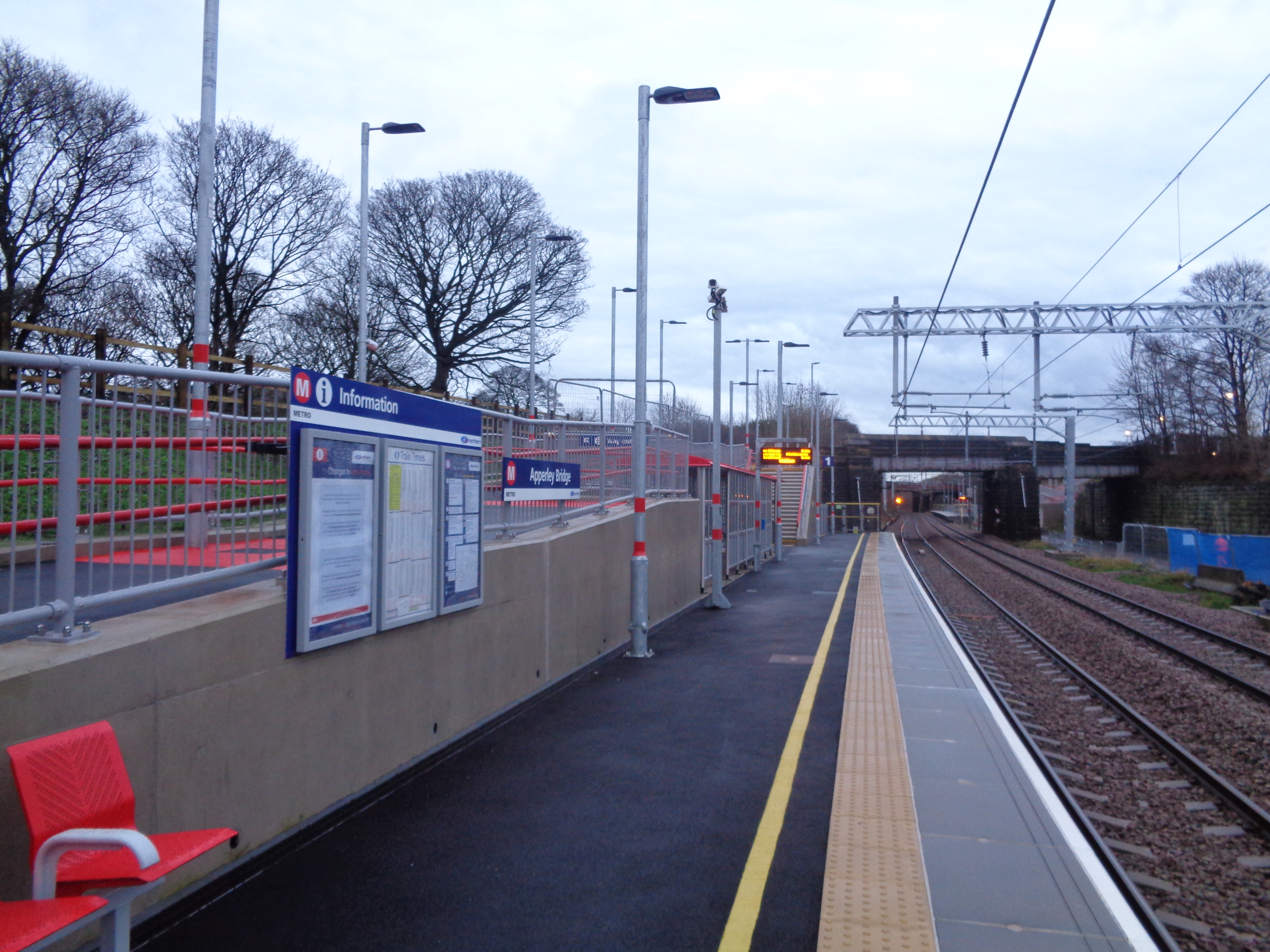
Apperley Bridge station opened in 2015.

The line is operated by Northern Trains. The fare structure is as follows (these show the West Yorkshire Metro rail zones):

- Zone 1: Leeds City
- Zone 2: Kirkstall Forge
- Zone 3: Apperley Bridge to Crossflatts. Shipley is also served by the Leeds–Bradford line and the Wharfedale line
- Zone 4: Keighley
- Zone 5: Steeton & Silsden
- Zone 7: Cononley to Skipton (from 17 May 2009)

== The future ==
Network Rail previously looked at ways of increasing capacity on the line. Because of the difficulty of lengthening platforms at Shipley, it will be hard to introduce longer trains (i.e. 5 or 6 carriages) as was proposed on the neighbouring Wharfedale line. It was therefore proposed to run more trains per hour between Leeds and Keighley, a new platform at Keighley would have helped accommodate this. New stations were opened at Apperley Bridge in December 2015 and Kirkstall Forge in June 2016.

London North Eastern Railway currently operate a small number of daily services on the line, between Skipton/Bradford and London King's Cross. These are operated by Class 91s, Class 800s and Class 801s. East Coast wanted to run more frequent services from December 2009 but to do so the line would need more capacity.

A 2008 report by Modern Railways claimed that a solid hourly service would operate on the line as far as Long Preston, but would serve Carlisle and Lancaster alternately. It may also become a freight artery to improve capacity on the West Coast Main Line. Network Rail's own plans involved new signalling and other improvements for the sections of the line beyond Skipton. Carlisle services would be increased to a basic two-hour pattern with extra services to 'fill in the gaps' at peak times during the day to give a 1 train/h frequency. Lancaster services would be made more frequent, however it was suggested they would be terminated at Skipton, rather than continuing through to Leeds. All of these plans were dependent on getting enough government funding.
