= Esholt Sewage Works Railway =

Former industrial railway in West Yorkshire, England

Coordinates: 53.84441°N 1.71707°W

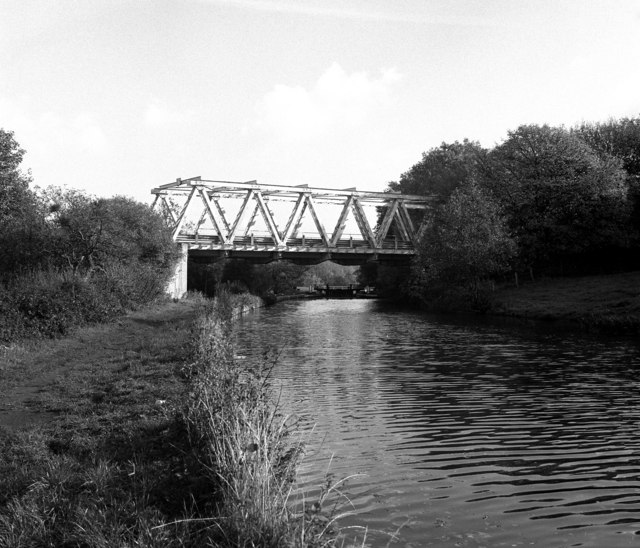
- Bridge over the Leeds and Liverpool Canal that carried the works railway.

Overview
- Status: Closed
- Owner: Yorkshire Water (at closure)
- Locale: Esholt, West Yorkshire
- Termini: Apperley Bridge Viaduct
- Stations: 0

Service
- Type: Works railway
- System: Private
- Operator: Yorkshire Water (at closure)

History
- Opened: 1910
- Closed: 1977

Technical
- Track length: 22 miles (35 km) (at peak)
- Track gauge: 4 ft 8 1/2 in (1,435 mm)

Esholt Sewage Works Railway was a standard gauge works railway constructed in 1910 to serve a sewage works in Esholt, West Yorkshire, England.

The works were built to remove wool-grease and other wastes from effluent coming out of the many mills of the Bradford woollen district. At its peak, the railway extended to 22 miles (35 km) of track served by 11 locomotives, as well as a shorter section of narrow gauge railway served by three engines. Trains were employed to remove solid waste from the site; several of the engines were converted to run on oil derived from recovered wool-grease.

The railway was closed completely in 1977, but the sewage works continues to operate.

== Origins ==
Bradford was a major force in woollen products in the 19th and into the 20th century; nearly 20% of the world's wool production was being handled at Bradford. A branch of the Leeds and Liverpool Canal extended up Bradford Dale from Shipley to a point near to where Bradford Forster Square railway station is today. Bradford Beck spilled into this canal arm and it suffered from very bad sewage problems. It was rumoured that the canal was so badly affected with incendiary chemicals and sulphureted hydrogen, that children used to set the canal alight.

Resolved to do something by new laws and the desire to rid themselves of the problem, Bradford Corporation initiated first the Frizinghall works (being the lowest part of the city at that time) and when this did not work, they bought the estate at Esholt adjacent to the River Aire. This was a protracted process that wasn't completed until 1906 with assent from parliament to build the works not being granted until 1909.

== The railway ==
In 1910, a railway branch line was connected to the Midland Railway's Leeds & Bradford Railway Line, leaving as a northerly spur west of Apperley Viaduct and east of Thackley Tunnel. The spur left the mainline immediately east of the rail bridge over the Leeds & Liverpool Canal with the branch and associated sidings staying, for the most part, to the east and north of the canal, and west and south of the river as both curve north of Thackley. Branches at Thackley Hill bridged both watercourses. The connection with the Midland line required a signal box and exchange sidings for the transfer of wagons between the two systems.

Sludge was pressed into 'Cake' at the Press House, a 237 feet (72 m) long, by 92 feet (28 m) wide building which housed the railway wagons in the basement. This allowed the 'Cake' to be gravity fed into the railway wagons for transfer to another part of the site. This would involve running into a siding, dumping the 'Cake' and leaving it to dry, before being sold as fertiliser and transhipped via the exchange sidings on the Midland line.

At the peak of the workings in 1931, 22 miles (35 km) of track existed being worked over by 11 locomotives, some of which were converted to run on oil derived from wool grease. When the locomotives were not being used (especially at night) the grease was kept molten by piping steam into the fireboxes. The grade 'A' product of the sewage works was used by the railway companies as an axle grease for freight wagons. Coal for the sewage beds was transhipped into the works via the connection from the Midland Railway as was Sulphuric acid until the works commissioned their own Sulphur plant in 1922. Because the sewage was gravity fed into the works, some steep inclines were present (as steep as 1 in 49 in places) and several sidings were taken up and re-laid in line with the building programme and whenever a section became redundant.

A small section of 2-foot (0.61 m) gauge railway also ran around part of the site. This was operated by two Simplex petrol tractors and one small steam locomotive. Additionally, a short section of standard gauge track ran parallel to the Midland Line and ran underneath the line to access an area of land used for tipping.

By 1957, the works was down to 6.5 miles (10.5 km) of track and full employment for only two locomotives, 'Nellie' and 'Elisabeth', both Hudswell Clarke 0-4-0ST engines. Steam engines were the workhorses for most of the railway's life, only yielding to diesel traction in 1976. The railway closed in 1977 with the works engine shed being transported brick for brick to the Industrial Museum at Armley in Leeds.

As with other industrial railways, it was owned and operated by a private enterprise and not by a railway company. As such it was never grouped or nationalised. The railway was operated by the water division of Bradford Corporation until 1973, when Yorkshire Water was formed. Yorkshire Water eventually took over running the railway from Bradford Council in 1975.

== The railway today ==
No railway exists at Esholt today, though many of the overbridges spanning the River Aire and the Leeds & Liverpool Canal are still extant. 0-4-0ST 'Nellie' was preserved at the Bradford Industrial Museum at Eccleshill, and one of the diesel engines, another 0-4-0 built by Hunslet of Leeds, found employment at Crossley's scrapyard just up the valley outside Shipley station on the Forster Square line.
