= Saltaire railway station =

Railway station in West Yorkshire, England

Saltaire
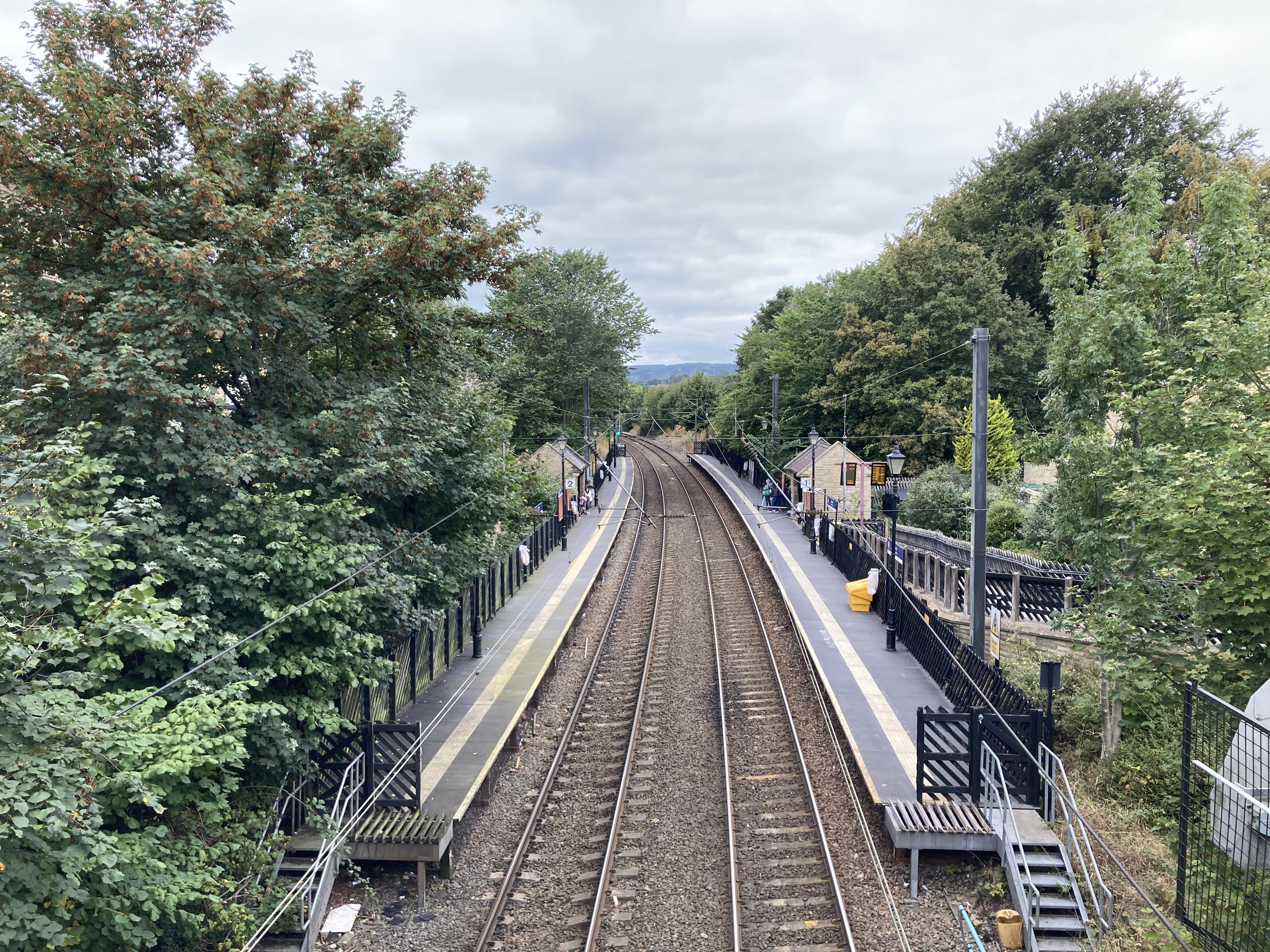
- Saltaire railway station viewed from Victoria Road. Platform 2 is on the left, and platform 1 on the right.

General information
- Location: Saltaire, City of Bradford; England
- Coordinates: 53.8385°N 1.7904°W
- Grid reference: SE138380
- Manager: Northern Trains
- Transit authority: West Yorkshire (Metro)
- Platforms: 2

Other information
- Station code: SAE
- Fare zone: 3
- Classification: DfT category F1

History
- Original company: Midland Railway
- Post-grouping: London, Midland and Scottish Railway

Key dates
- May 1856: opened
- 20 March 1965: closed
- 9 April 1984: reopened

Passengers
- 2021/22: ▲0.547 million
- 2022/23: ▲0.636 million
- 2023/24: ▲0.669 million
- 2024/25: ▲0.749 million
- 2025/26: ▲0.800 million
Location
Notes
- Passenger statistics from the Office of Rail and Road

Saltaire railway station serves the Victorian model village of Saltaire near Shipley in West Yorkshire, England. It is situated 3 1/2 miles (6 km) north of Bradford Forster Square.

== History ==
The original station was opened in May 1856 by the Midland Railway, which had absorbed the Leeds and Bradford Extension Railway between Shipley and Colne in 1851. It closed on 20 March 1965 following the Beeching cuts, but West Yorkshire Passenger Transport Executive and British Rail reopened it on 9 April 1984, at a cost of £139,000 (equivalent to £452,700 in 2025). The current station has wooden platforms and waiting shelters (though these are stone-built rather than the metal and plexiglass designs used elsewhere). Its predecessor was of more substantial stone construction, with buildings on each platform; these were demolished in 1970, five years after the station closed.

The station is on the Airedale line, between Bradford and Leeds, and Skipton. It is a busy commuter station both for passengers travelling to Leeds and Bradford and for staff in companies based in Salt's Mill, as well as serving tourists visiting the UNESCO World Heritage Site at Saltaire.

The lower station of the Shipley Glen Tramway is about half a mile from Saltaire Station. The Leeds and Liverpool Canal, River Aire and Roberts Park, Saltaire are also close by.

=== Stationmasters ===
Sometime after 1927 the position of station master was merged with that of Shipley.

- J. Mitchell until 1861
- William Secker 1861 - 1907
- Thomas Ripley 1907 - 1920
- Albert John Bell 1921 - 1927
- F.J. Dando from 1927 (formerly station master at Embsay, afterwards station master at Cherry Tree)

== Facilities ==
Though unstaffed, the station has ticket machines available. There is step-free access to both platforms via ramps from the street above. Train running information can be obtained via digital information screens, timetable posters and an automated public address system.

== Services ==
Since the May 2023 timetable update, there is a half-hourly service to Leeds, an hourly service to Bradford Forster Square and three trains per hour to Skipton throughout the day Mondays to Saturdays. The Bradford service increases to half-hourly at peak times, with some additional services also to Leeds and Skipton. One early morning train to both Carlisle and Carnforth also call here (the former on weekdays only).

On Sundays, there is an hourly service to Leeds and to Bradford Forster Square, with two trains per hour to Skipton. The first departures from Leeds to both Lancaster and Carlisle also stop.

Preceding station	National Rail	Following station
Shipley	Northern Trains; Airedale Line	Bingley
	Historical railways	
Shipley	Midland Railway; Leeds and Bradford Extension Railway	Bingley

The platforms with Salts Mill in the background

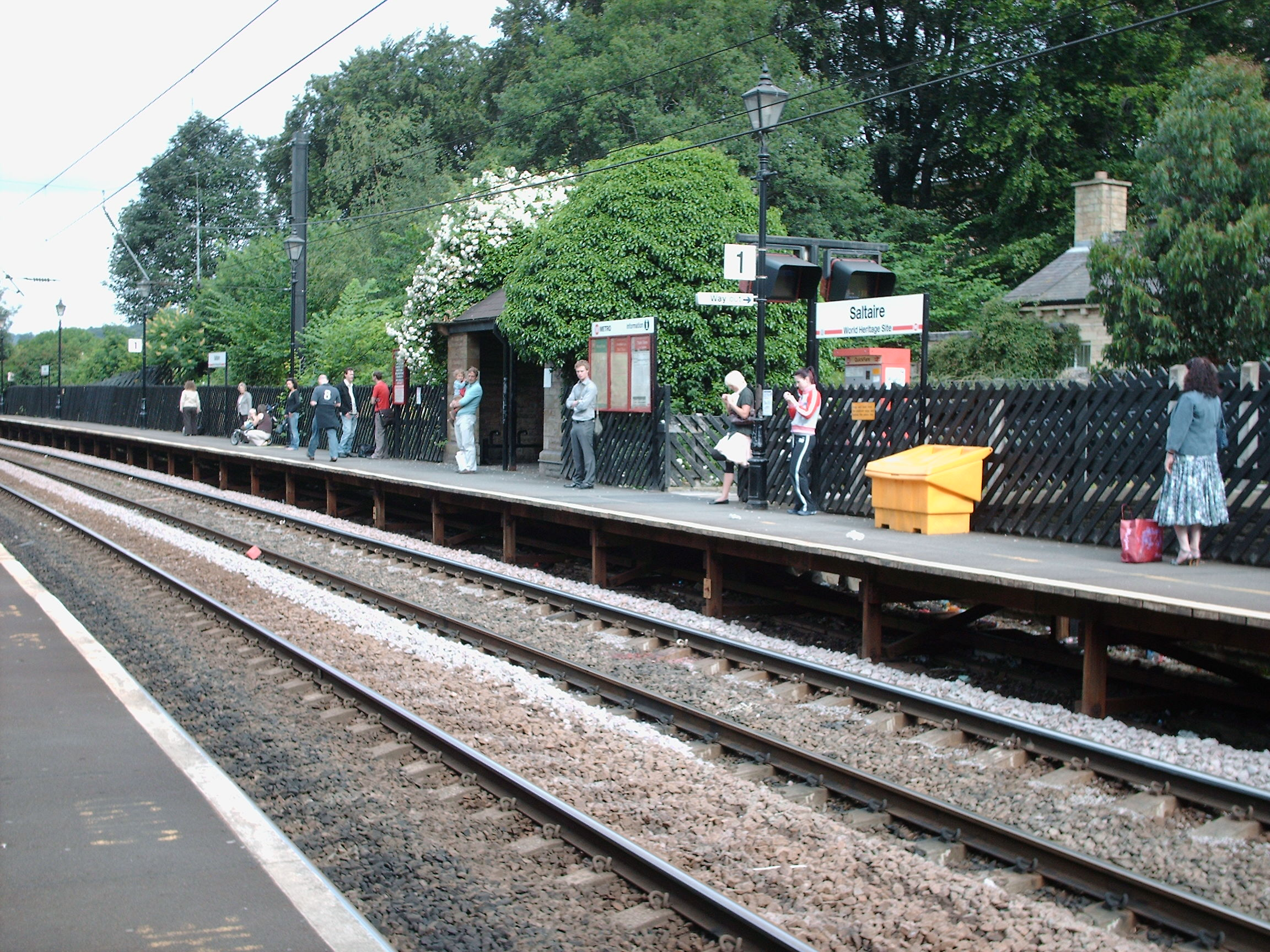
The view from platform 2.

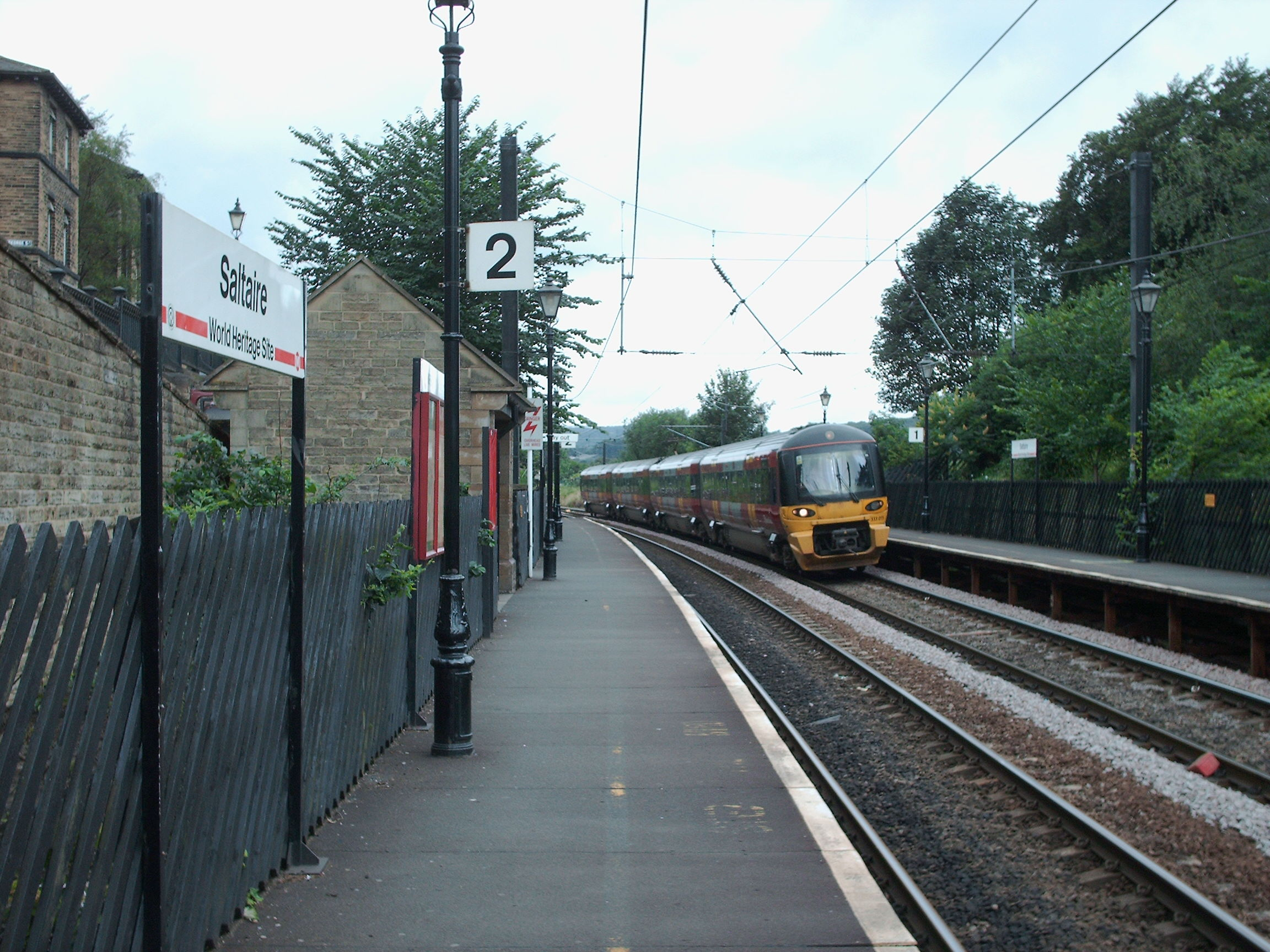
Platform 2.

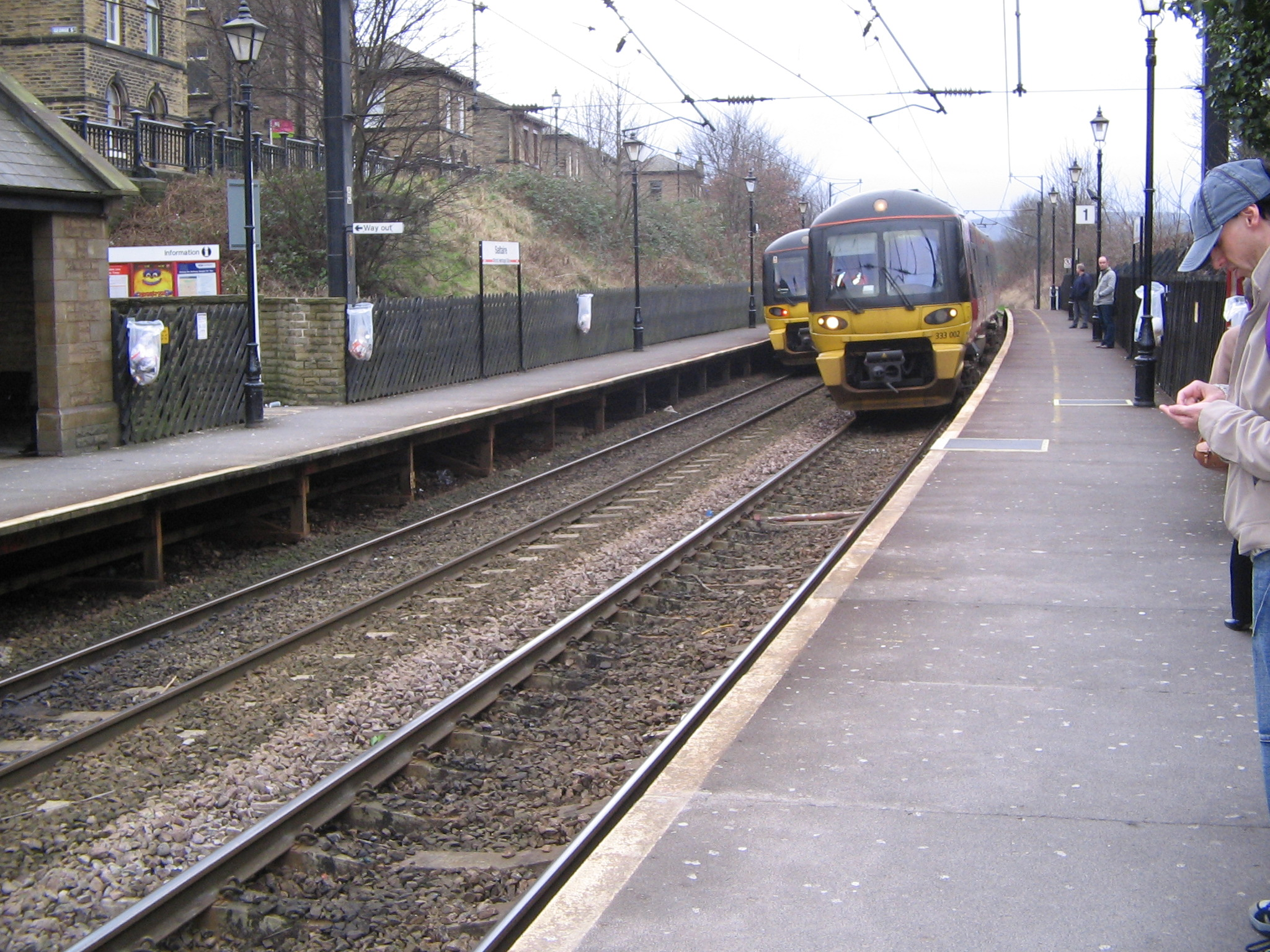
Two Class 333 trains cross at the station.

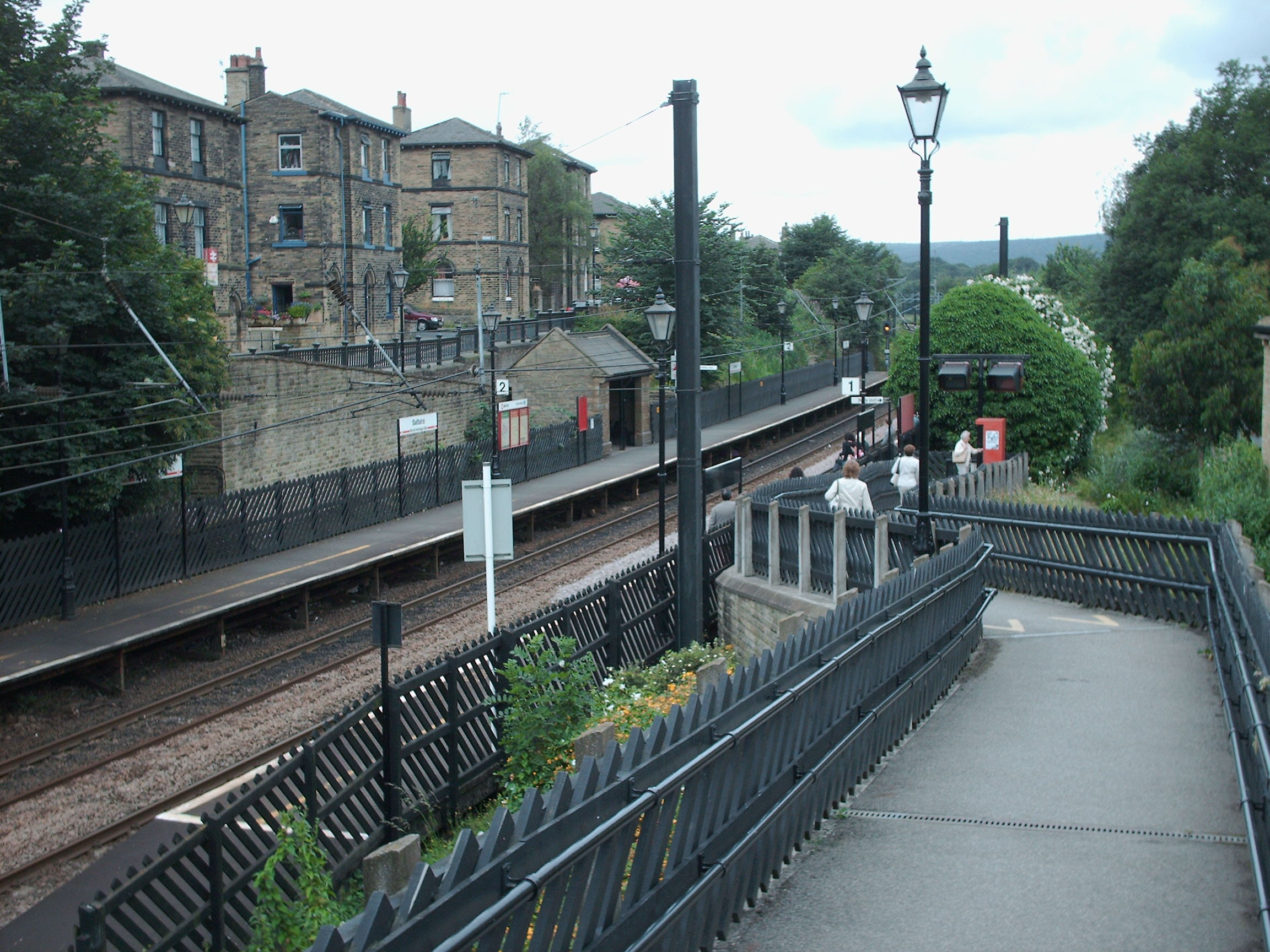
Looking down the entrance rampe

== Bibliography ==
- Bairstow, Martin (April 2004). Railways Through Airedale & Wharfedale. Martin Bairstow. ISBN 1-871944-28-7.
- Chapman, Stephen. Railway Memories No. 7: Airedale & Wharfedale. Bellcode books. ISBN 1-871233-05-4.
