= Steeton and Silsden railway station =

Railway station in West Yorkshire, England

Steeton and Silsden
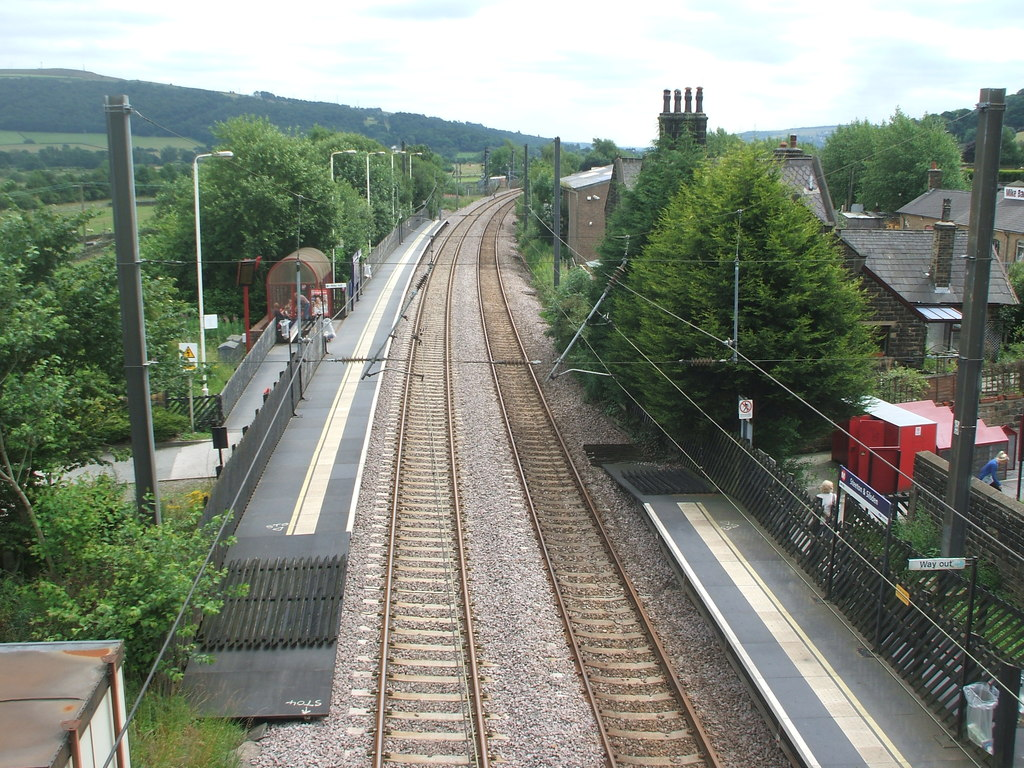

General information
- Location: Steeton, City of Bradford; England
- Coordinates: 53.899980°N 1.944380°W
- Grid reference: SE037448
- Manager: Northern
- Transit authority: West Yorkshire (Metro)
- Platforms: 2

Other information
- Station code: SON
- Fare zone: 5
- Classification: DfT category F1

History
- Original company: Leeds and Bradford Railway
- Pre-grouping: Midland Railway
- Post-grouping: London, Midland and Scottish Railway

Key dates
- December 1847: First station opened as Steeton
- 1 September 1868: Renamed Steeton and Silsden
- 1 March 1892: Station re-sited
- 22 March 1965: Station closed
- 14 May 1990: Reopened

Passengers
- 2021/22: ▲0.445 million
- 2022/23: ▲0.492 million
- 2023/24: ▲0.529 million
- 2024/25: ▲0.595 million
- 2025/26: ▲0.659 million
Location
Notes
- Passenger statistics from the Office of Rail and Road

Steeton and Silsden railway station serves the village of Steeton and the town of Silsden in West Yorkshire, England. It is situated closer to Steeton than to Silsden, and is on the Airedale Line. The station, and all trains serving it, are operated by Northern.

== History ==
Steeton & Silsden was opened by the Leeds and Bradford Extension Railway in December 1847, and was later re-sited in march 1892. The station was closed on 20 March 1965 (a victim of the Beeching Axe) but reopened in 1990. The current (staggered) station platforms built by British Rail are located on the site of the old A6068 level crossing, which was replaced by the current road bridge in 1988 as part of the Aire Valley Trunk Road project. Until its closure, both platforms were situated to the north of the former crossing, although the original station building (which survives as a private residence) was located on the Keighley side (south of the current northbound platform).

Because the station is the first station within the West Yorkshire Passenger Transport Executive subsidised ticketing region on the line into Leeds and Bradford from Skipton, there are perceived to be problems with car parking at the station, as people from outside the region drive in from North Yorkshire and Lancashire to take advantage of the subsidised ticketing. An extension to the Metro area, to include Skipton, was hoped to alleviate that when it took effect on 17 May 2009. However, the crowded car park problem still exists, so the West Yorkshire Combined Authority had plans to build a new multi-storey car park with 247 spaces by the end of 2020, costing £3.89 million. The project was delayed and construction is expected to start in April 2022, and was costed at £4.63 million to deliver 245 car parking spaces. Further delays to the construction were caused by having to remediate land previously used as a weapon factory in the Second World War. This pushed the final cost to over £7 million. The car park was completed and opened in July 2024.

Until recently, the station lacked full access for disabled users, which led some to catch trains in the opposite direction to change platforms. Access is now possible via a fairly steep ramp to the Leeds & Bradford-bound platform. Though the station is normally unstaffed, there are ticket machines available at the station for passengers to use. The station has digital information screens and a long-line PA system.

== Services ==
During Monday to Saturday in the daytime and evenings there is a half-hourly service to Leeds, an hourly service to Bradford Forster Square and three trains per hour to Skipton. At peak times, there is an additional one tph to Skipton and Bradford.

On Sundays, there is an hourly service to both Leeds and Bradford Forster Square, with two trains per hour to Skipton.

The services are mostly operated by Northern Class 333 electric multiple units, but Class 331 sets are also used regularly.

Most regional services to destinations beyond Skipton (to Morecambe and Carlisle) do not stop here - connections are available at Skipton. A limited number do stop though - two early a.m. services to Carlisle and Carnforth respectively and one afternoon Morecambe train call on weekdays and Saturdays (as do one from Lancaster and one from Ribblehead in the opposite direction), whilst on Sundays the first morning trains to each destination do so.

Services are provided by Class 158 Diesel Multiple Units.

Preceding station	National Rail	Following station
Keighley	Northern; Airedale line	Cononley
Keighley	Northern; Leeds–Morecambe line	Skipton
Keighley	Northern; Settle–Carlisle line	Skipton
	Historical railways	
Keighley	Midland Railway; Leeds and Bradford Extension Railway	Kildwick and Crosshills
