= Kildwick and Crosshills railway station =

Disused railway station in North Yorkshire, England

Kildwick & Crosshills
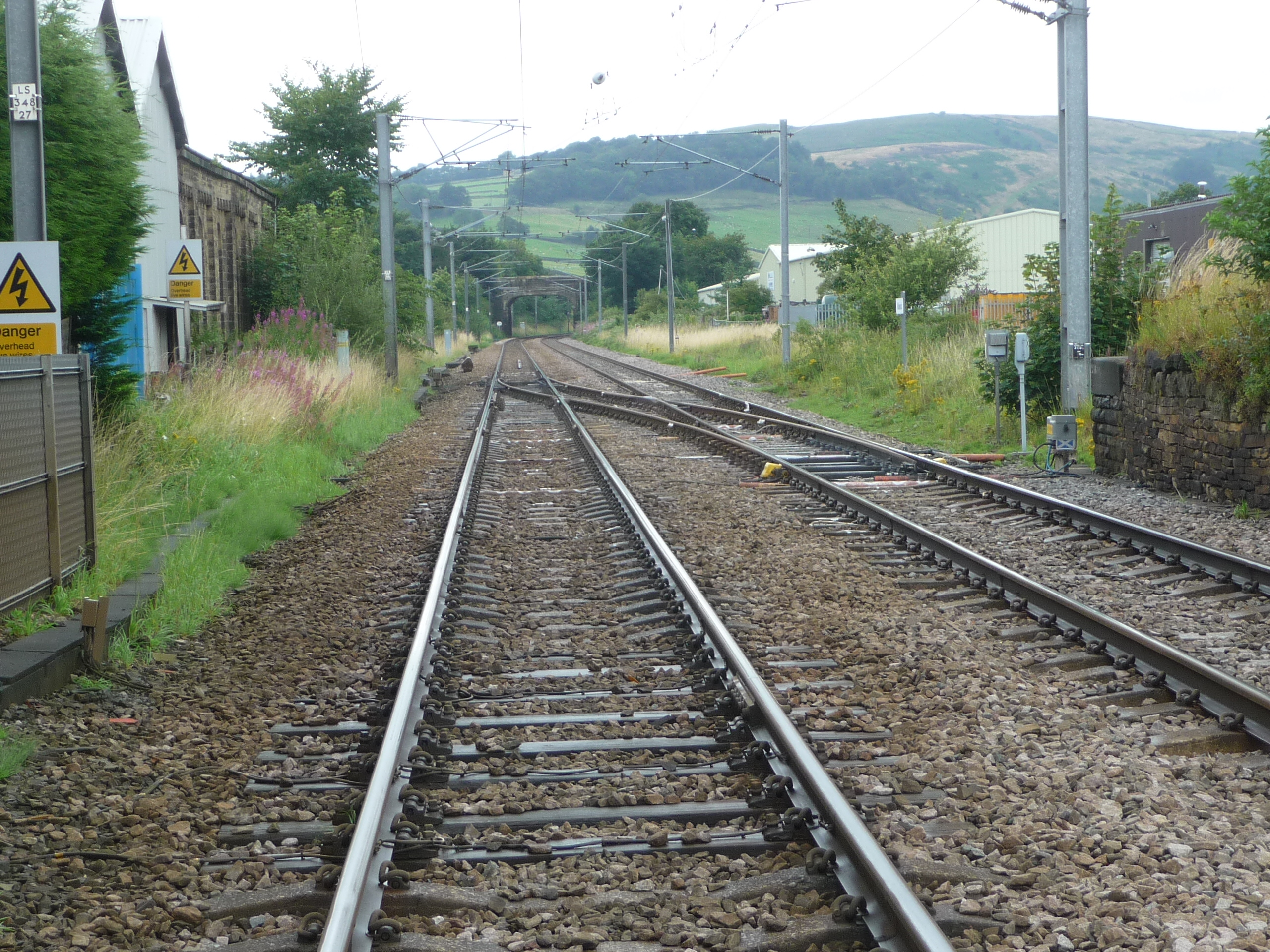
- Site of the 1847 station

General information
- Location: Cross Hills, North Yorkshire; England
- Coordinates: 53.9042°N 1.9892°W
- Grid reference: SE008453
- Platforms: 2

Other information
- Status: Disused

History
- Original company: Leeds and Bradford Extension Railway
- Pre-grouping: Midland Railway
- Post-grouping: London, Midland and Scottish Railway

Key dates
- by September 1847: Opened as Kildwick
- by 1 January 1863: Renamed Kildwick & Cross Hills
- after 1 October 1884: Renamed Kildwick & Crosshills
- 7 April 1889: Relocated to Station Road
- 22 March 1965: Closed
Location

Maps showing
Kildwick & Crosshills Station

Old OS Maps (1936)
NPE Maps
Vision of Britain
Other maps

53.9042°N 1.9892°W

Kildwick and Crosshills [sic] was a railway station off Station Road in Cross Hills, North Yorkshire (formerly West Riding of Yorkshire), England. It served the villages of Cross Hills, Cowling, Glusburn, Kildwick and Sutton-in-Craven.

== History ==
The station was opened in late 1847 by the Leeds and Bradford Extension Railway, located between Cononley and Steeton and Silsden. The latter, which is about two miles (3 km) from both Cross Hills and Kildwick, is now the nearest station to all five villages. The station was originally called Kildwick, then Kildwick and Cross Hills. The original station was located on a level crossing on the modern-day A6068 just south of its junction with the A629 at Kildwick roundabout on the River Aire. In 1889 the station, which by now had been renamed Kildwick and Crosshills and was owned by the Midland Railway, was relocated 1/4 mile (0.4 km) to the west, by a humpback bridge on the road now known as Station Road. The second station closed to traffic on 22 March 1965.

Some former railway buildings have survived in this area, although they have been sold for other uses, but a signal box which stood beside the level crossing was demolished following the resignalling and electrification of the route in 1993–4. There is a former railway goods yard on the southern side of the track between the bridge and the level crossing and this is now used as a depot for road repairs by the local council.

The station was closed on 22 March 1965 and its buildings and platforms subsequently removed, but the line remains in use for freight, express passenger and local passenger trains. It is the main line from Leeds to Carlisle and Morecambe and as part of the electrified Airedale Line it carries commuter services running between Leeds and Skipton. Proposals have been put forward on several occasions to re-open the station but none of these have been successful. West Yorkshire Metro listed the former site as having a strong business case in 2014 and ordered further study. However in December 2017, North Yorkshire County Council announced the shelving of plans to reopen the station due to a very low Benefit/Cost Ratio and because a reopened station would mean additional traffic on local roads and would cause the barriers at the adjacent Kildwick level crossing to be in the down position for longer.

== Accident ==
Kildwick and Cross Hills station was the site of a serious accident in 1875, killing seven and injuring 40. Late at night on 28 August, an excursion returning from Morecambe to Leeds was stopped at the station at the request of the Cononley signalman who had noticed its rear light was not working. Despite his request, the same signalman allowed an Ingleton-to-Leeds mail train to follow just 4½ minutes behind. The signalman claimed the mail train was let through on a "caution" signal; the engine driver claimed the signal was "all clear". Approaching Kildwick station, the driver did not see a stop signal until it was too late, and hit the stationary passenger train at 15 mph (24 km/h). The accident could have been avoided if the "timed interval" signalling system which was in use at the time had been replaced by the "absolute block" system that the Midland Railway was already phasing in. Under the old system, trains were allowed to follow within five minutes of each other while under the new system, a section of track had to be completely clear before a train could enter it.

== Notes ==
Preceding station	Historical railways	Following station
Steeton and Silsden	Midland Railway; Leeds and Bradford Extension Railway	Cononley
