= Cononley railway station =

Railway station in North Yorkshire, England

Cononley
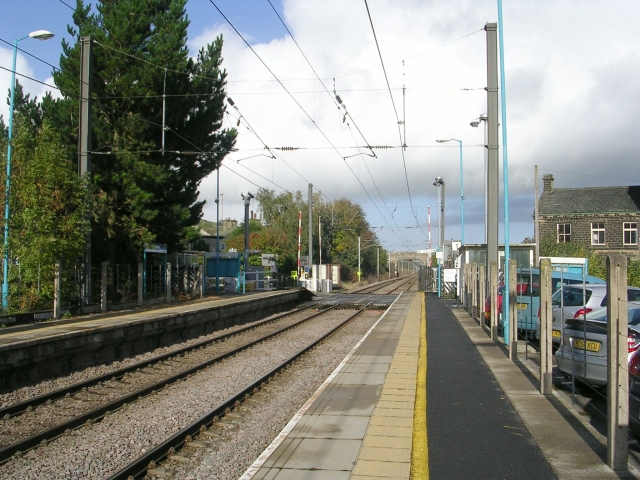

General information
- Location: Cononley, North Yorkshire; England
- Coordinates: 53.9173°N 2.0119°W
- Grid reference: SD993467
- Manager: Northern Trains
- Transit authority: West Yorkshire (Metro)
- Platforms: 2

Other information
- Station code: CEY
- Fare zone: 7
- Classification: DfT category F1

Key dates
- 1847: Opened
- 22 March 1965: Closed
- 20 April 1988: Reopened

Passengers
- 2021/22: ▲0.126 million
- 2022/23: ▲0.155 million
- 2023/24: ▲0.171 million
- 2024/25: ▲0.183 million
- 2025/26: ▼0.179 million
Location
Notes
- Passenger statistics from the Office of Rail and Road

Cononley railway station serves the village of Cononley in North Yorkshire, England. The station, and all trains serving it, are operated by Northern Trains.

== History ==
The station was first opened in late 1847, at a cost of £900, by the Leeds and Bradford Extension Railway. It was closed on 22 March 1965, though its platforms remained intact and the main buildings survived until the mid-1970s.

It was reopened by British Rail on 20 April 1988 at a cost of £34,000, which was borne by the county, district and local parish councils and the Rural Development Commission.

== Facilities ==
The station has two platforms and is right beside Cononley's main street. Step-free access is available to both platforms, via the level crossing at the Skipton end of the station. It is unstaffed, but has now been fitted with ticket machines (one on the southbound platform and the other on the northbound side adjacent to the exit) to allow passengers to buy before travelling. An automated tannoy system and digital information screens provide train running information to passengers.

== Services ==
During Monday to Saturday daytimes, there is a half-hourly service to Leeds and hourly to Bradford Forster Square, with three trains per hour towards Skipton. The Bradford service was reduced from every 30 minutes back to hourly at the spring 2023 timetable change, though it still runs at this increased frequency at peak periods.

On Sundays is an hourly service to Leeds and Bradford with two trains per hour to Skipton.

These services are normally provided by Class 333 or Class 331 electric multiple units.

Services towards Morecambe and Carlisle normally pass through without stopping; however, the first morning services to Carlisle and Carnforth, plus the last evening train from Ribblehead to Leeds, each serve the station. One train to both Morecambe and Carlisle stop here on Sunday mornings.

Preceding station	National Rail	Following station
Steeton and Silsden	Northern; Airedale line	Skipton
Steeton and Silsden	Northern; Leeds–Morecambe line	Skipton
Steeton and Silsden	Northern; Settle–Carlisle line	Skipton
	Historical railways	
Kildwick and Crosshills; Station closed; Line open	Midland Railway; Leeds and Bradford Extension Railway	Skipton
