= Keighley railway station =

Railway station in West Yorkshire, England

Keighley
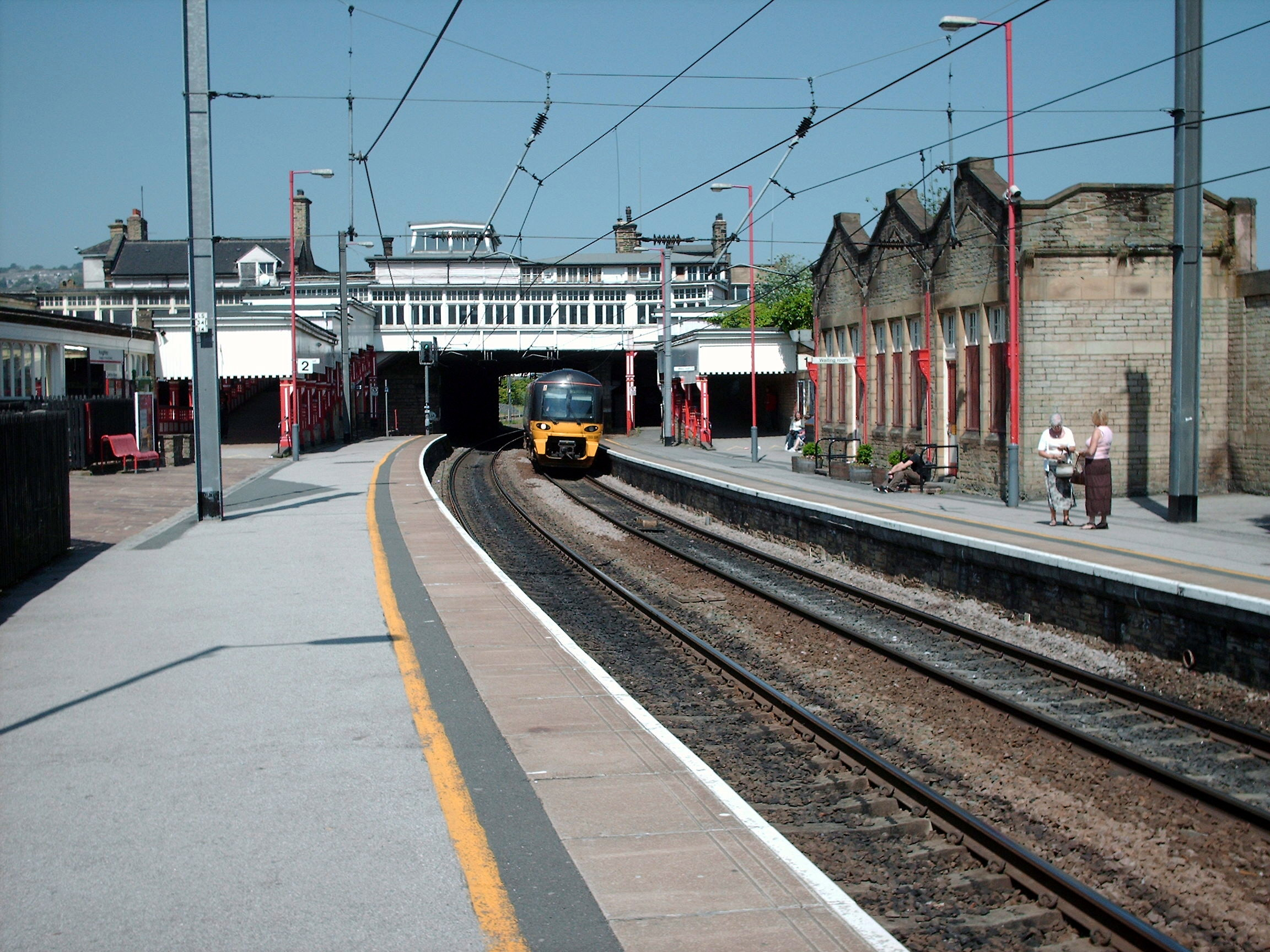
- Platforms 1 and 2, with a Northern Rail Class 333 train calling

General information
- Location: Keighley, City of Bradford, England
- Coordinates: 53.8679°N 1.9011°W
- Grid reference: SE066413
- Manager: Northern Trains
- Transit authority: West Yorkshire (Metro)
- Platforms: 2 National Rail, 2 K&WVR

Other information
- Station code: KEI
- Fare zone: 4
- Classification: DfT category C2

History
- Original company: Leeds and Bradford Extension Railway
- Pre-grouping: Midland Railway
- Post-grouping: London, Midland and Scottish Railway

Key dates
- 16 Mar 1847: Opened (Note: North of the road bridge.)
- 6 May 1883: Relocated (Note: South of the road bridge.)

Passengers
- 2021/22: ▲1.150 million
- 2022/23: ▲1.291 million
- 2023/24: ▲1.325 million
- 2024/25: ▲1.406 million
- 2025/26: ▲1.492 million
Location
Notes
- Passenger statistics from the Office of Rail and Road

Keighley railway station serves the market town of Keighley, in West Yorkshire, England. The station lies on the Airedale line, 17 miles (27 km) north-west of Leeds. Northern Trains operates electric services to Leeds, Skipton and Bradford Forster Square, along with longer-distance diesel services to Morecambe and Carlisle. The station is divided between National Rail services that operate from platforms 1 and 2, while platforms 3 and 4 are the northern terminus of heritage services to Oxenhope on the Keighley & Worth Valley Railway.

== History ==
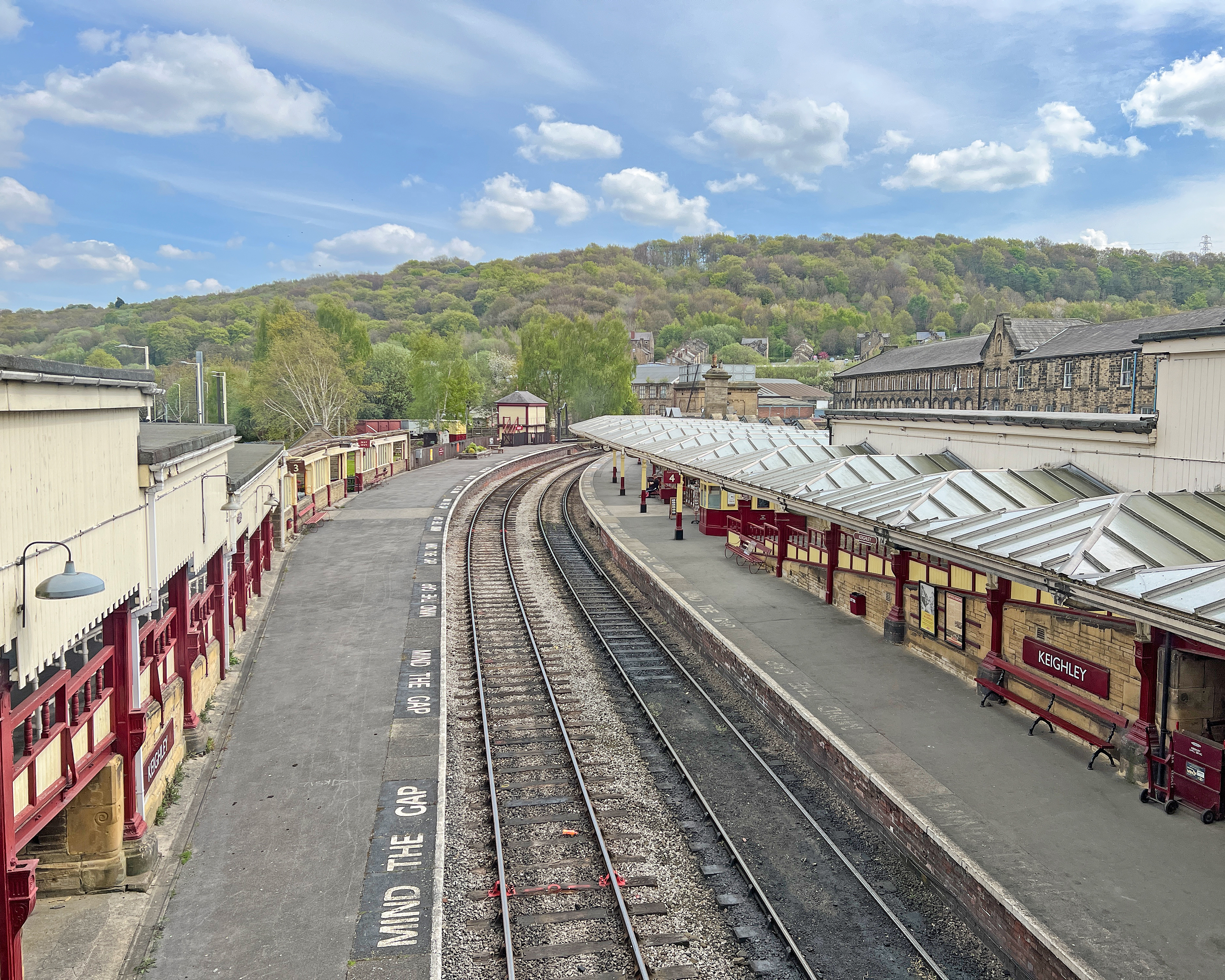
Platforms 3 and 4, which serve the K&WVR in heritage decoration

Keighley station was first opened by the Leeds and Bradford Extension Railway (LBER), on a site slightly further up the line in March 1847. The volume of traffic over the original level crossing in the town, prompted the Midland Railway, which had absorbed the LBER, to spend £60,000 in 1876 building the road bridge immediately to the north of where the present station is located. A new station was built south of this bridge in 1883–1885, designed by Charles Trubshaw who was a Midland Railway architect.

It is also the northern terminus of the Keighley & Worth Valley Railway (K&WVR). This is a heritage branch line railway run by volunteers that was originally built by the Midland Railway and opened in 1867. Closed to British Railways' passenger traffic in 1962, it was reopened by the K&WVR Preservation Society six years later and is now a popular tourist attraction.

Trains on the Great Northern Railway's Queensbury lines to Bradford Exchange and Halifax also served Keighley from 1882 until closure in May 1955.

From 1892 to 1909, the Midland Railway operated a second station on the Airedale line a short distance from Keighley station at Thwaites. There is now no visible trace of this station.

In 1986, the station was given a Grade II listing by Historic England as a building of special architectural or historic interest. The listing mentions the main entrance building to be of coursed, dressed millstone grit. The two westernmost platforms have period furnishings, including cast-iron lamp posts; on platform 4, a good cast-iron and glass canopy with decorative columns; and on platform 3, an eight-columned arcade, the remains of a canopy and a late 19th century engine water-filling pump.

In 2025, a major £10m refurbishment of the station was completed. This included replacing the roof and much of the old ironwork, repairing the front canopy and creating a new visitor centre in the old water tower for the KWVR.

== Facilities ==
The National Rail side of the station is fully staffed, with the ticket office open seven days a week (except evenings). Train running information is provided via a public address system, posters and digital information screens. A waiting room is available on platform 1 and shelters on platform 2. Step-free access to both platforms from the main entrance is via ramps from the road above, whilst platform 1 also has level access from Dalton Lane.

The K&WVR has its own ticket office, with access ramps from the shared main entrance to platforms 3 and 4. It also has a refreshment stand and bookstall on platform 4, which is open when the railway is operating.

== Services ==
=== National Rail ===
Keighley is served by two train operating companies, which provide the following services in trains per hour/day (tph/tpd):

Northern Trains:

- 3 tph to Skipton
- 2 tph to Leeds, on the Airedale Line
- 1 tph to Bradford Forster Square
- 1 tp2h to Lancaster on the Bentham Line; most services extend to Morecambe
- 1 tp2h to Carlisle, on the Settle and Carlisle Line
- 1 tph to Leeds, on the Bentham Line.

London North Eastern Railway:

- 1 tpd to London King's Cross, via Leeds, except on Sunday
- 1 tpd to Skipton (for alighting passengers only).

=== Heritage ===
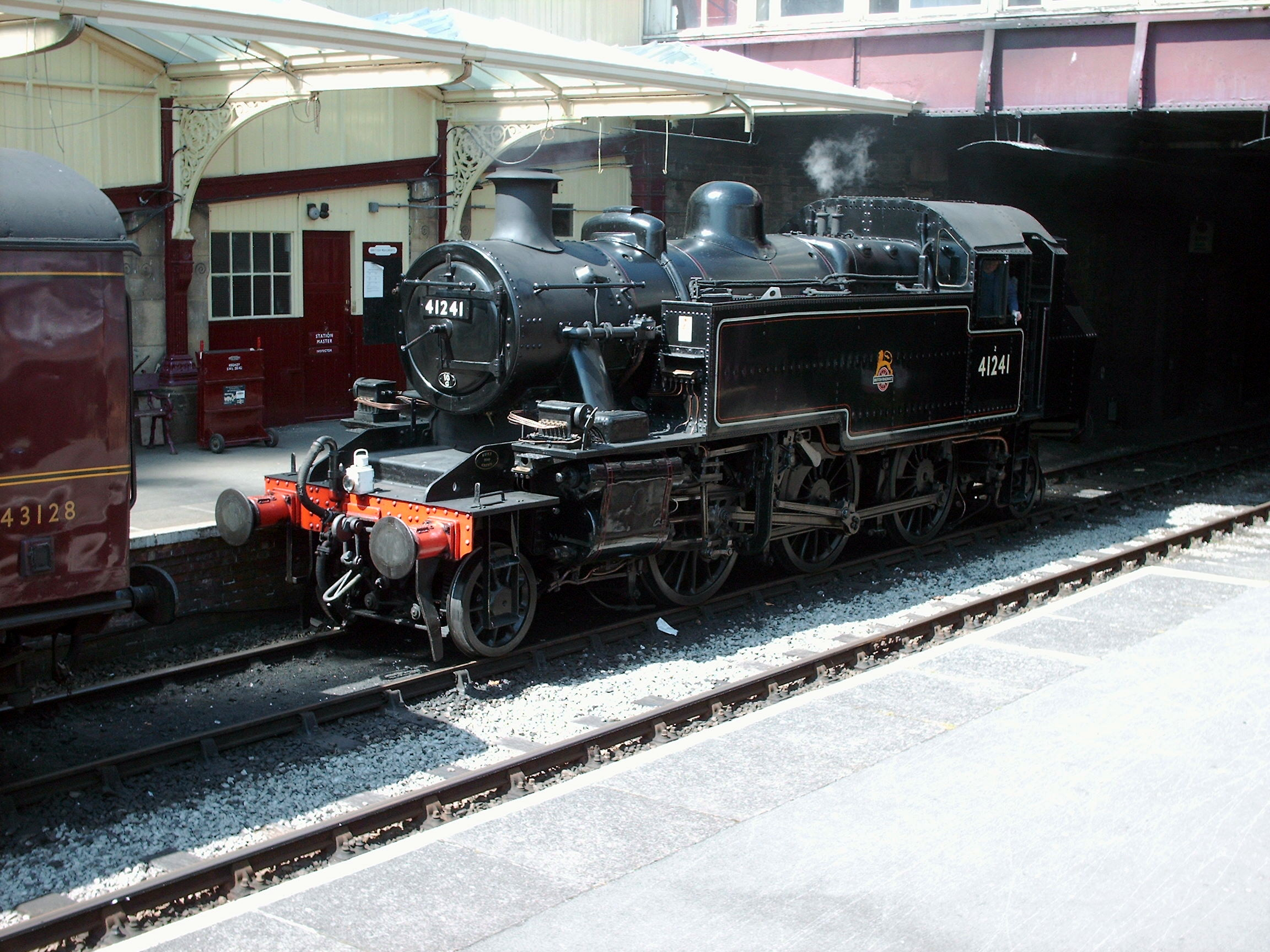
A steam locomotive at the platform

Services operate throughout the year, with running days allocated to a particular coloured timetable; these include purple in summer, with green and blue in winter.

The K&WVR has resisted offers to introduce a true commuter service in conjunction with the local authority. It has a connection to the Airedale Line, via sidings, just north of the Bradford Road bridge for rolling stock transfers and occasional visits by charter trains.

Preceding station	National Rail	Following station
Shipley	London North Eastern Railway (Limited service)	Skipton
Bingley	Northern; Leeds–Morecambe line	Skipton
Bingley	Northern; Settle–Carlisle line	Skipton
Crossflatts	Northern; Airedale line	Steeton and Silsden
Preceding station	Heritage railways	Following station
Ingrow (West) towards Oxenhope	Keighley & Worth Valley Railway	Terminus
Disused railways
Ingrow (East)	Great Northern Railway; Queensbury lines	Terminus
Historical railways
Thwaites	Midland Railway; Leeds and Bradford Extension Railway	Steeton and Silsden

== In popular culture ==
The station was used in the filming of the film Yanks (1979) during the ending, where the troops board their train to head to the front. and in the Pink Floyd film, The Wall (1982).

It was used in the filming of Peaky Blinders, a BBC television drama about criminals in Birmingham just after the First World War.

The station was featured in the Head & Shoulders advertisement Don't Break Up With Your Hair in 2009. It uses a K&WVR platform, notable for the period features that it has retained over the years.

In the first episode of All Creatures Great and Small (2020), the main character, James Herriot, says goodbye to his parents and boards a train in Glasgow; these scenes were actually filmed at Keighley station. A KWVR train also appears in that episode.

== See also ==
- Listed buildings in Keighley
