= Crossflatts railway station =

Railway station in West Yorkshire, England

Crossflatts
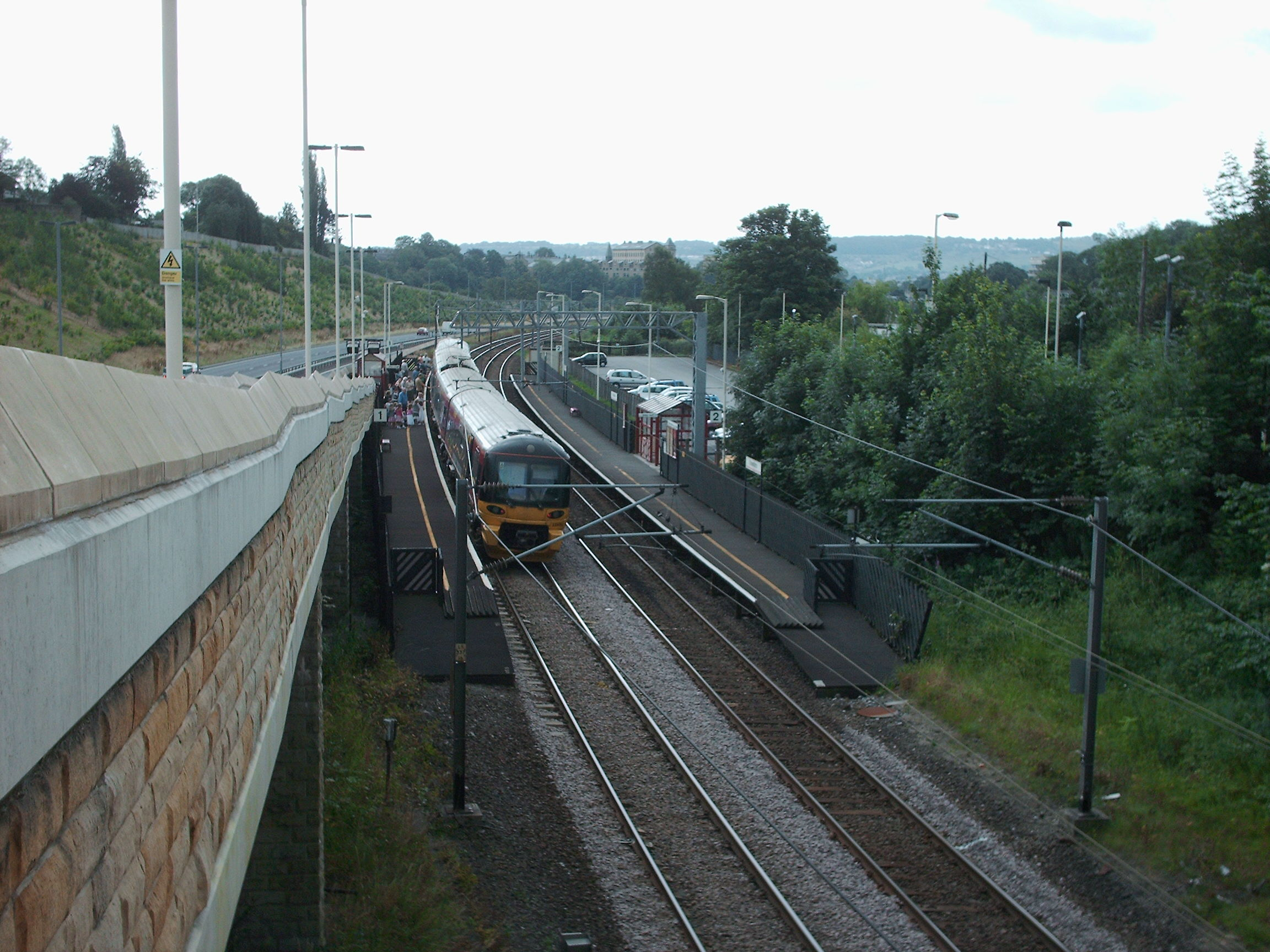

General information
- Location: Bingley, City of Bradford; England
- Coordinates: 53.858550°N 1.844920°W
- Grid reference: SE102402
- Manager: Northern
- Transit authority: West Yorkshire (Metro)
- Platforms: 2

Other information
- Station code: CFL
- Fare zone: 3
- Classification: DfT category F1

History
- Opened: 1982

Passengers
- 2021/22: ▲0.317 million
- 2022/23: ▲0.376 million
- 2023/24: ▲0.397 million
- 2024/25: ▲0.442 million
- 2025/26: ▲0.453 million
Location
Notes
- Passenger statistics from the Office of Rail and Road

Crossflatts railway station serves the Crossflatts area of Bingley, north of Bradford in West Yorkshire, England. The station is on the Airedale Line, 14.5 miles (23 km) north west of Leeds and 6.5 miles (10 km) north west of Bradford Forster Square. The station, and all trains serving it, are operated by Northern.

The station was opened on 17 May 1982 at a cost of £78,000. It was the first of the eighties-era stations on the Airedale Line to be opened and is the only one to be built by British Rail on an entirely new site (the others - such as Saltaire and Frizinghall - had all previously been closed in 1965 as part of the Beeching cuts).

== Facilities ==
The station is unstaffed, but there are ticket machines available. Step-free access to both platforms is via ramps from the main road. Digital passenger information screens, timetable poster boards and an automated announcement system are installed to provide train running details.

== Services ==
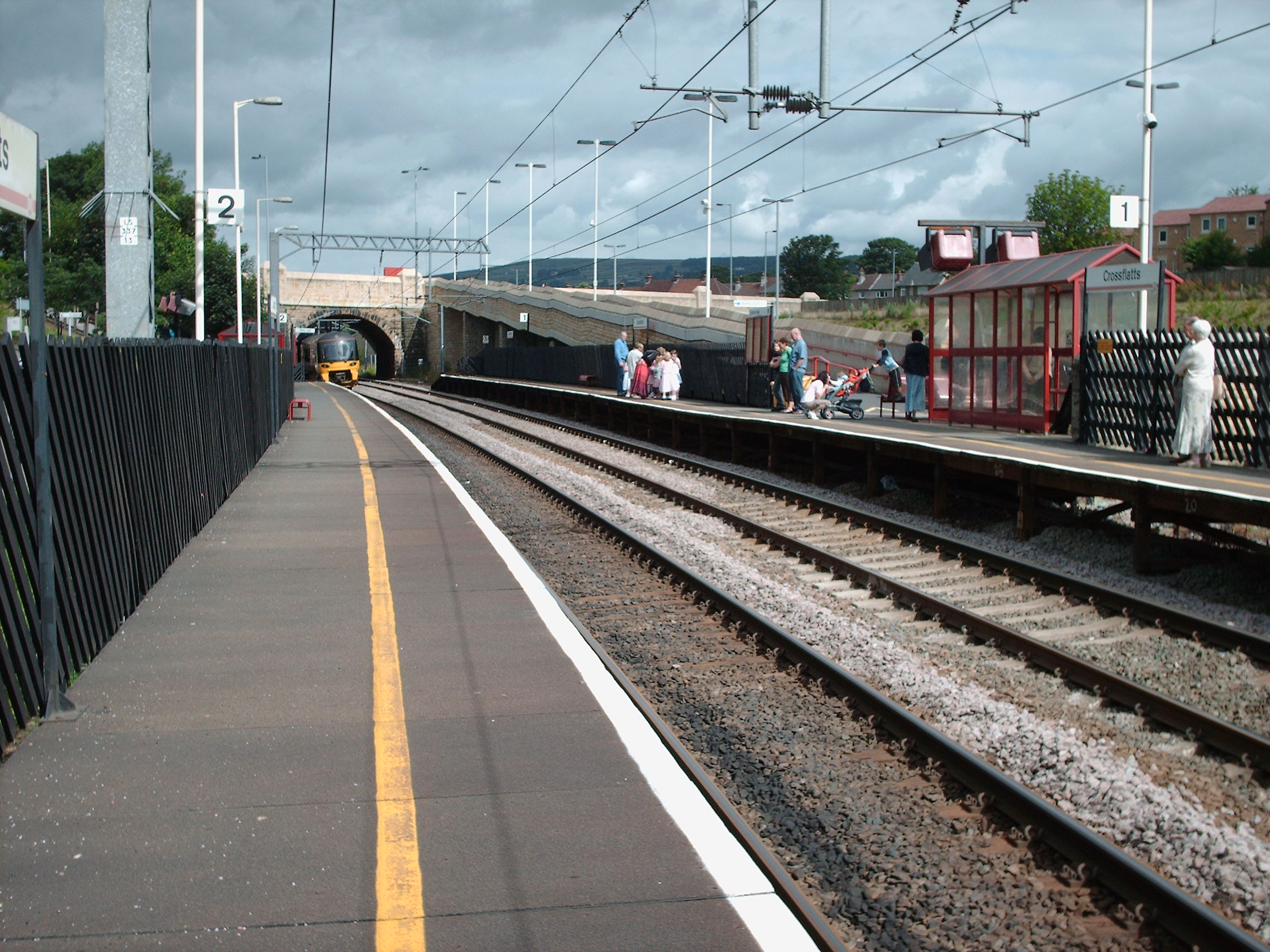
Platform 2. July 2006

There is a half-hourly service to Leeds, an hourly service to Bradford Forster Square and three trains per hour to Skipton throughout the day on weekdays and Saturdays (extra services stop at peak times, when the Bradford service increases to half-hourly). The first daily departure from Leeds to Carlisle and from Bradford to Carnforth stops here on weekdays (as does the evening Ribblehead to Leeds service), but other longer distance services run through without calling here.

On Sundays there is an hourly service to Leeds and to Bradford Forster Square, with two trains per hour to Skipton. The first departures of the day from Leeds to both Morecambe & Carlisle also call.

Preceding station	National Rail	Following station
Bingley	Northern; Airedale Line	Keighley
