= 1856 in rail transport =

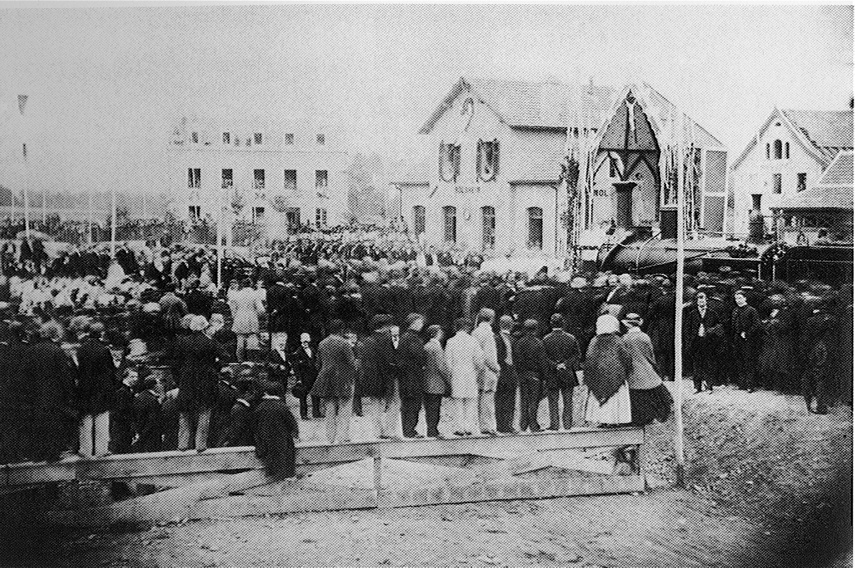
Image of the inauguration of Molsheim’s railway station

This article lists events related to rail transport that occurred in 1856.

== Events ==
=== January events ===
- January – Opening throughout of first railroad in Africa and the Middle East, from Alexandria to Cairo, Egypt (208 km or 129 mi).
- January 29 – The 223-mile North Carolina Railroad is completed from Goldsboro through Raleigh and Salisbury to Charlotte.

=== March events ===
- March 23 or 26 – Cambridge Railroad street railway opens in Boston (United States), giving the city the world's oldest continuously working streetcar system.

=== April events ===
- April 19 – Death of American locomotive builder Thomas Rogers, following which his son, Jacob S. Rogers, reorganizes Rogers, Ketchum and Grosvenor as Rogers Locomotive and Machine Works.
- April 21 – The first railroad bridge across the Mississippi River opens between Rock Island, Illinois, and Davenport, Iowa.

=== May events ===
- May 1 – First section of Bombay, Baroda and Central India Railway opens, between Ankleshwar and Utran.
- May 6 – The newly constructed sidewheeler Effie Afton runs into one of the supports for the first railroad bridge across the Mississippi River, causing a fire that destroys the bridge just two weeks after it had opened.

=== June events ===
- June 21 – The Illinois Central Railroad opens its Great Central Station in Chicago.

=== July events ===
- July 14 – The Rome and Frascati Rail Road opens for service.
- July 17 – The Great Train Wreck (the worst railroad calamity in the world up to this date) occurs near Philadelphia in the United States.

=== September events ===
- September 16 – Tarragona–Reus line in Spain opens.
- September 21 – The Illinois Central Railroad connects Chicago to Cairo, Illinois, completing 700 miles (1,126 km) of track to become the longest railway in the United States.
- September 22 – The Oriental Railway Company is granted the concession to build the first railway in Turkey, from İzmir to Aydın.

=== October events ===
- October 23 – The line that is now Belgian railway line 161 is completed and opened connecting Brussels-North and Namur stations.
- October 28 – Opening of first railway in Portugal, from Lisbon to Carregado (37 km or 23 mi).

=== December events ===
- December 1 – Opening of first steam-operated passenger railways in Sweden, from Gothenburg to Jonsered (15 km or 9.3 mi) and Malmö to Lund (17 km or 11 mi).

== Births ==
=== February births ===
- February 2 – Frederick William Vanderbilt, director of the New York Central system (d. 1938).

=== December births ===
- December 30 – Sam Fay, General manager of the Great Central Railway of England, 1902–1922 (d. 1953).

== Deaths ==
=== January deaths ===
- January 8 – Charles "Joe" Baldwin, conductor on the Wilmington and Manchester Railroad

=== March deaths ===
- March 11 – James Beatty, Irish engineer who was involved in building the European and North American Railway and the Grand Crimean Central Railway (b. 1820).

=== April deaths ===
- April 19 – Thomas Rogers, American steam locomotive builder, dies in New York (b. 1792).
- April 20 – Robert L. Stevens, president of Camden and Amboy Railroad (b. 1787).

=== November deaths ===
- November 1 - John Urpeth Rastrick, English steam locomotive builder and partner in Foster, Rastrick and Company (b. 1780).
