= Shipley railway station =

Railway station in West Yorkshire, England

Shipley
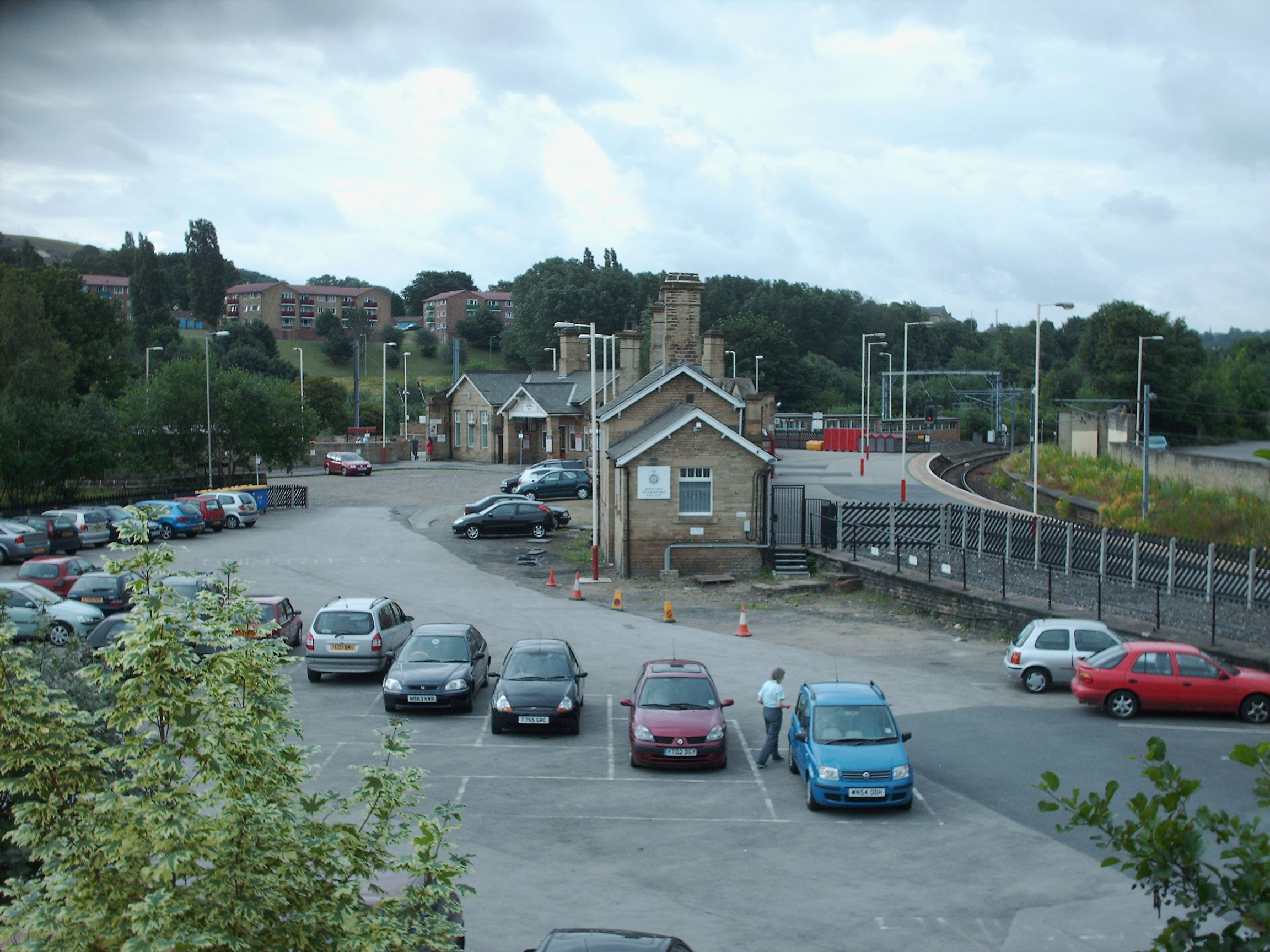
- Platform 5

General information
- Location: Shipley, City of Bradford; England
- Coordinates: 53.8331°N 1.7734°W
- Grid reference: SE150374
- Manager: Northern Trains
- Transit authority: West Yorkshire (Metro)
- Platforms: 5

Other information
- Station code: SHY
- Fare zone: 3
- Classification: DfT category D

Key dates
- 16 July 1846: First station opened
- 1849: Station resited

Passengers
- 2021/22: ▲1.005 million
- 2022/23: ▲1.107 million
- 2023/24: ▲1.130 million
- 2024/25: ▲1.196 million
- 2025/26: ▲1.260 million
Location
Notes
- Passenger statistics from the Office of Rail and Road

Shipley railway station serves the market town of Shipley in West Yorkshire, England. It is 2 3/4 miles (4.4 km) north of Bradford Forster Square and 10 3/4 miles (17.3 km) north-west of Leeds.

Train services are mostly commuter services between Leeds and Bradford, the Airedale line (Leeds and Bradford to Skipton, via Keighley), and the Wharfedale Line (Leeds and Bradford to Ilkley). There are also a few main-line London North Eastern Railway services between Bradford or Skipton and London, and it also lies on the line from Leeds to Glasgow via the Settle-Carlisle Railway.

Shipley is one of only two surviving "triangular" stations in the UK: it has platforms on all three sides of a triangle of lines.

== History ==
When the Leeds and Bradford Railway built the first railway link into Bradford in 1846, they did not take the shortest route, but a flatter and slightly longer one up Airedale to Shipley then south along Bradford Dale to Bradford. They built stations at several places along the route, including Shipley, which opened in July 1846. This was a wooden island platform situated some 660 feet (200 m) south of the current station.

In 1847, the Leeds and Bradford Extension Railway was built from Shipley to Keighley and Skipton, creating the triangle of lines which surrounds today's station. The north curve was opened in 1848 and was on a much tighter alignment than the present 1883 curve. The original curve would pass through the car park. The north side of Shipley station had an embankment of stone which the Midland Railway company quarried for railway purposes, when this quarry face was exhausted, the new curve was laid across the quarry floor.

The Leeds and Bradford was absorbed by the Midland Railway in 1851, and the Midland successively became part of the LMS and British Railways.

The station was originally located some 550 yards (500 m) south of the current location where Valley Road crosses the line to Bradford. However, in 1849, a new station was built in the present position between the junctions of the line from Bradford to Leeds and Skipton

The present station was built at some time between 1883 and 1892, nestling between the western (Bradford-Skipton) and eastern (Leeds-Bradford) arms of the triangle. It was designed by the Midland's architect Charles Trubshaw. Platform 3 (on the Bradford-Leeds arm) was lengthened in 1990, to serve full-length InterCity trains. The northern (Leeds-Skipton) arm of the triangle is distant from the main station and had no platforms until May 1979. Before then, trains on the Leeds-Shipley-Skipton run had to come through the station to the Bradford branch and reverse. From 1979, there was a single platform there, on the inside of the triangle, so Skipton-Leeds trains had to cross over to reach it. At the same time, the Bradford to Keighley side of the triangle was singled as two trains could not pass on this side anyway due to the restricted clearances. The current platform 1 on the north side was built in 1992.

It is now one of two remaining triangular stations in the UK: the other being Earlestown station in Merseyside. Ambergate station was previously triangular but only retains one platform and Queensbury station was closed to passengers in 1955.

Until the Beeching Axe closures of 1965, the next stations from Shipley were Saltaire on the Airedale line to the west, Baildon on the Wharfedale line to the North, Apperley Bridge in the east towards Leeds, and Frizinghall in the south towards Bradford. Baildon station closed in 1953, but on 20 March 1965, the other three of these stations closed, along with another dozen stations and the local service between Bradford and Leeds. Most of the services through Shipley were under threat and hung in the balance until the West Yorkshire Passenger Transport Executive adopted them in the 1970s. All four of these adjacent stations have since been reopened: Baildon on 5 January 1973, Saltaire in April 1984, Frizinghall in 1987, and Apperley Bridge on 13 December 2015.

Between 1875 and 1931, there was a second station, Shipley and Windhill railway station on Leeds Road very close to Shipley Station which served the Shipley and Windhill Line.

Platforms 1 (Leeds bound) and 4 (Bradford Forster Square bound) were extended in 2025, Platform 1 by 45m at the western end and Platform 4 by 100m to the north, this is to allow for six-carriage trains in the future. The extension of Platform 4 also allows Bradford bound LNER services to stop there as it was not long enough. Previously trains had to cross the tracks to Platform 3. Platform 3, was also extended by 25m in a separate project by the means of a steel-framed cantilevered structure over the A657 road and the Bradford Beck. A new depot for electric trains was started in 2024, which is expected to be operational by 2026. The depot is located to the south of the station adjacent to the line towards Bradford Forster Square.

=== Butterfly meadow ===
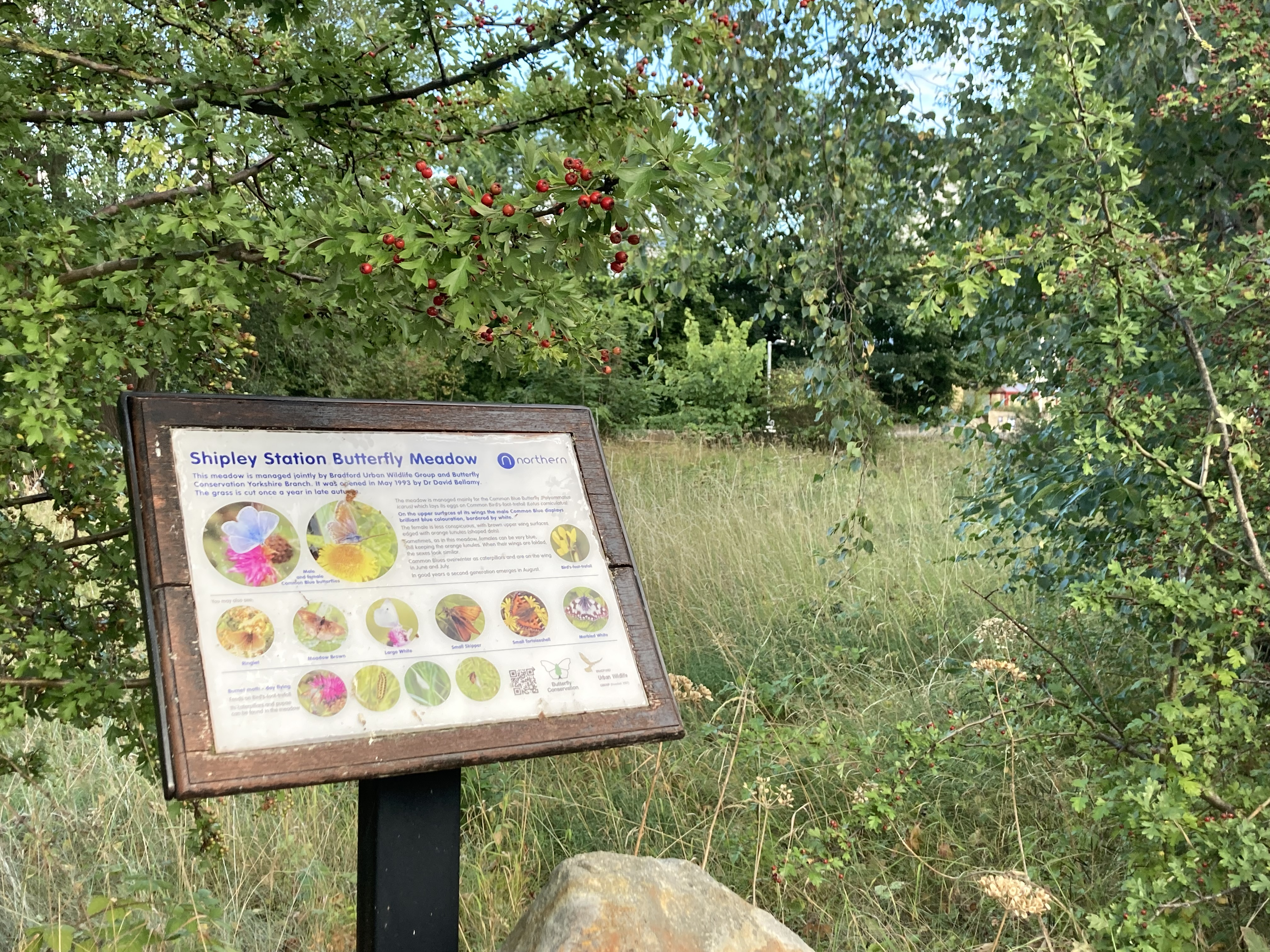
Shipley railway station butterfly meadow

In the middle of the station is a small butterfly meadow. It was opened in 1993 by David Bellamy and is administered by Butterfly Conservation, Bradford Urban Wildlife Group and Leeds Groundwork Trust.

== Access and facilities ==
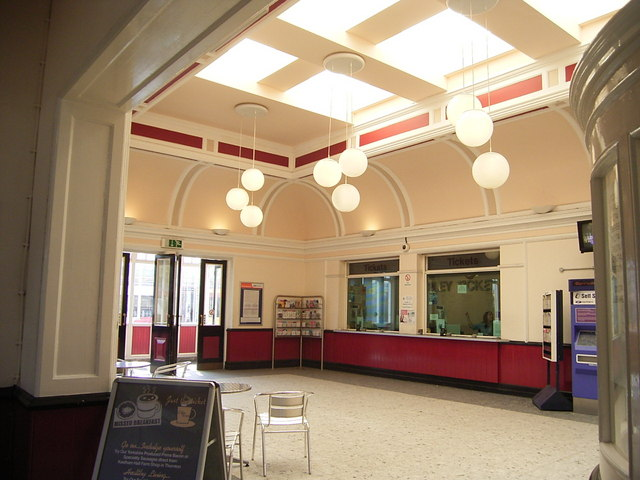
Booking hall

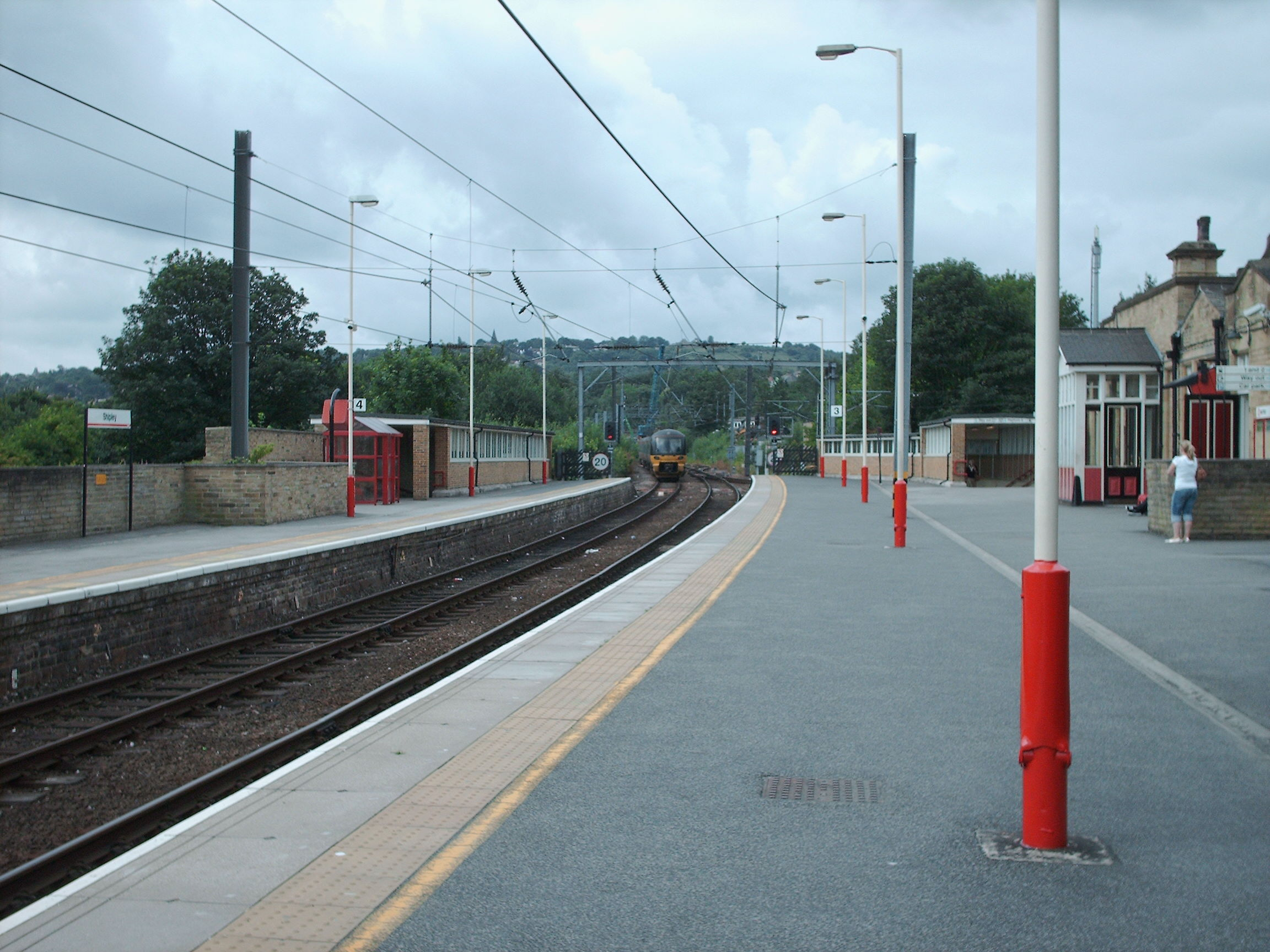
The view from platform 3

The station has 5 Platforms in a triangle.

- Platform 1 Skipton – Leeds
- Platform 2 Leeds – Skipton
- Platform 3 Bradford Forster Square – Leeds (full length)
- Platform 4 Leeds – Bradford (short)
- Platform 5 Bradford – Skipton and back single line

The station lies to the east of the town centre, across Otley Road, There is no access directly from Otley Road: pedestrian access from town is either via a tunnel at the bottom of Station Road, or from Stead Street onto platform 1. Vehicular access is from the side away from town, under the bridge and up a long cobbled drive (Station Approach) from Briggate and there is a large car-park between the main station and platforms 1/2.

There are no bus stops on the station forecourt: bus connections are either on Briggate/Leeds Road, or in the Market Square (5–10 minutes walk away). There is also no taxi rank within the station: again, passengers need to go into the town centre.

The station is fully staffed – the ticket office is open seven days per week and only closed in the evening. Ticket machines are also available, along with digital information screens and a long-line Public Address System (PA) for train running information.

Step-free access is available to platforms 2, 3 and 5. Platforms 1 and 4 can be reached by disabled passengers via lifts (there is also a subway with steep ramp to platform 4).

== Services ==
Most of the services are commuter services operated by Northern Trains, as part of the MetroTrain network. During Monday to Saturday daytimes, these operate every 30 minutes on the following routes:

- Leeds-Bradford Forster Square;
- Leeds-Skipton;

The below run hourly in the daytime, but increase to half-hourly at peak times:

- Bradford Forster Square-Skipton;
- Bradford Forster Square-Ilkley.

On Monday-Saturday evenings, a half-hourly service is maintained between Leeds and Skipton. Ilkley and Skipton to Bradford are hourly. There is no direct service between Leeds and Bradford but a shuttle from Shipley to Bradford connects with Leeds departures. On Sundays, Ilkley/Skipton – Bradford and Skipton and Bradford to Leeds each operate once per hour. These services are operated by Northern Trains Class 331 and Class 333 electric multiple units.

There are also a number of trains each day from Leeds to Carlisle (eight on weekdays and six on Sundays) and Lancaster (eight on weekdays, of which five are through trains to Morecambe plus one that terminates at Carnforth; five call on Sundays; both routes operated by Northern Trains), and from both Skipton and Bradford Forster Square to London King's Cross (via Leeds), which are operated by London North Eastern Railway. The northbound Kings Cross to Skipton service does not stop at platform 2 as it is too short for a full-length express. Since May 2025, seven LNER trains a day (Monday-Saturday) have called at Shipley to/from Bradford Forster Square.

=== Future changes ===
Six LNER trains a day will run on Sundays from December 2025.

Preceding station	National Rail	Following station
Leeds	London North Eastern Railway; East Coast Main Line	Bradford; Forster Square
Leeds	London North Eastern Railway; East Coast Main Line	Keighley
Kirkstall Forge	Northern Trains; Leeds–Bradford line	Frizinghall
Apperley Bridge	Northern Trains; Leeds–Bradford line	Frizinghall
Apperley Bridge	Northern Trains; Airedale line	Saltaire
Leeds	Northern Trains; Airedale line	Saltaire
Frizinghall	Northern Trains; Airedale line	Saltaire
Kirkstall Forge	Northern Trains; Airedale line	Saltaire
Leeds	Northern Trains; Leeds–Morecambe line	Bingley
Leeds	Northern Trains; Settle–Carlisle line	Bingley
Frizinghall	Northern Trains; Wharfedale line	Baildon
	Historical railways	
Frizinghall	Midland Railway; Leeds and Bradford Extension Railway	Saltaire
Frizinghall	Midland Railway; Leeds and Bradford Railway	Idle

== Bibliography ==
- Chapman, Stephen N. D. Railway Memories No. 7: Airedale & Wharfedaile Bellcode books. ISBN 1-871233-05-4
- Dewick, Tony 2002 Compete Atlas of Railway Station Names Ian Allan Publishing. ISBN 0-7110-2798-6
- Heritage Cartography N. D. Shipley 1847 (based on the Ordnance Survey 1:10,560 County Series Map: Yourshire CGI: Survey of 1847). ISBN 1-903004-90-X
- Sheeran, George 1994 Railway Buildings of West Yorkshire, 1812–1920 Ryburn. ISBN 1-85331-100-6
- Smith, F. W. & Martin Bairstow The Otley and Ilkley Joint Railway Martin Bairstow. ISBN 1-871944-06-6.
- Whitaker, Alan & Brian Myland 1993 Railway Memories No. 4: Bradford Bellcode books. ISBN 1-871233-03-8
