= Leeds and Bradford Extension Railway =

Former UK railway company

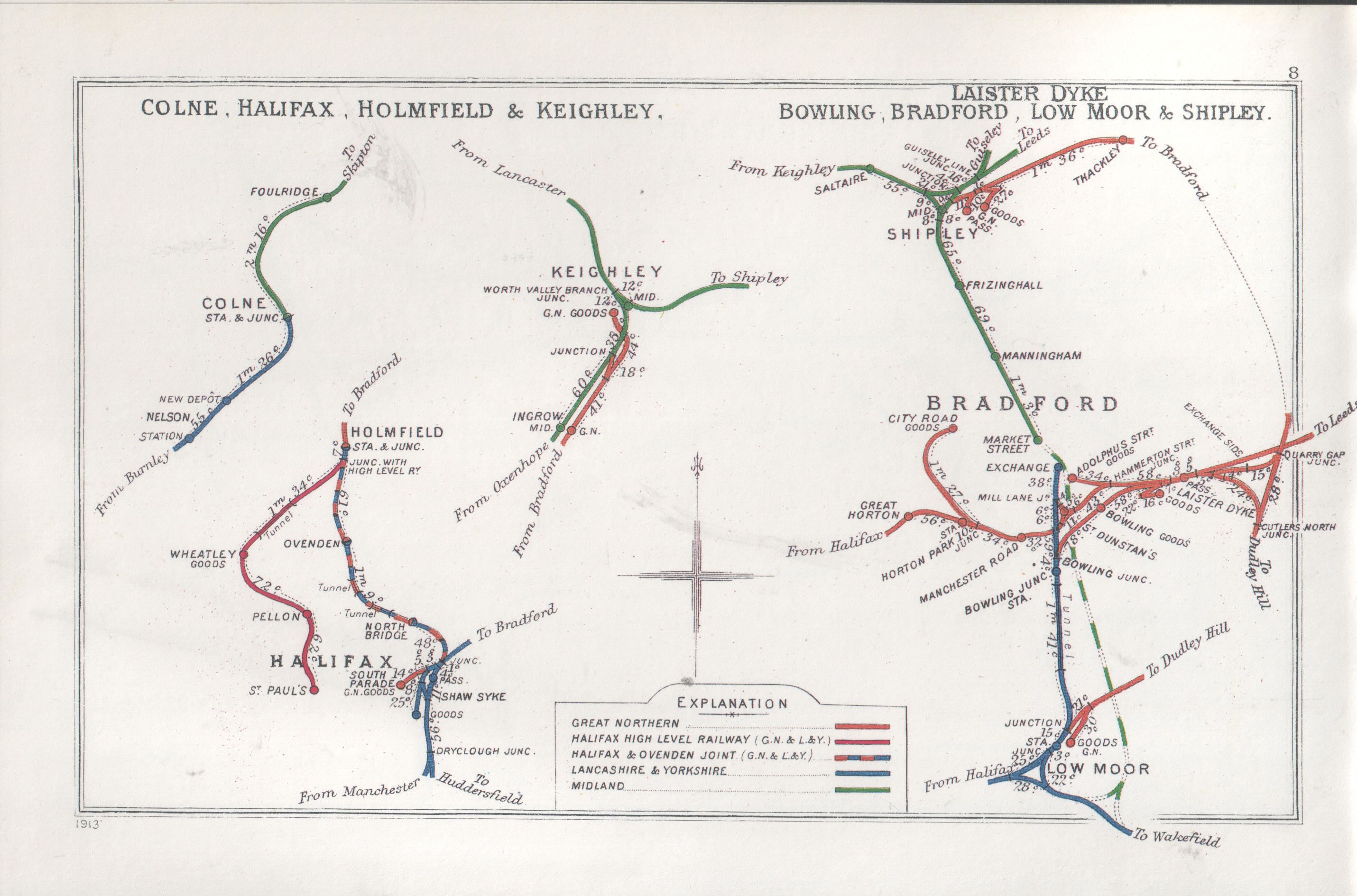
Maps showing both ends and the middle of the former L&BER in 1913

The Leeds and Bradford Extension Railway was an early British railway company in the West Riding of Yorkshire. It built a line from Shipley near Bradford through Keighley and Skipton to Colne. The Skipton–Colne Line closed in 1970, but the remainder of the line is still in use today, and once formed part of the Midland Railway's main line route from London to Glasgow.

== History ==
=== Authorisation ===
The Leeds and Bradford (Shipley–Colne Extension) Railway Act of 30 June 1845 empowered the company to build its line as an extension of the Leeds and Bradford Railway, which was still under construction between Leeds and Bradford. In July 1846, the company was leased to the Midland Railway, which later absorbed it on 24 July 1851.

=== Opening ===
The first section of the line was from Shipley, at a triangular junction with the Leeds and Bradford Railway, to Keighley. A tender for construction was let on 15 October 1845 and the section opened on 16 March 1847. The line included a 151-yard (138 m) tunnel at Bingley.

A second section from Keighley to Skipton opened on 7 September 1847, initially as a single track, but doubled by the end of the year. Trains ran between Bradford and Skipton; passengers to and from Leeds changed at Shipley.

The final section between Skipton and Colne was contracted on 9 September 1846 and opened on 2 October 1848. At Colne it was to make an end-on junction with the East Lancashire Railway's Blackburn, Burnley, Accrington and Colne Extension Railway, which did not open until 1 February 1849. By 2 April in the same year the line was part of a through route between Leeds and Liverpool, but the majority of passenger trains were local between Skipton and Colne.

=== Little North Western Railway ===
The "Little" North Western Railway built a line, from a junction just west of Skipton, which would eventually become the main line through Skipton. The Skipton to Ingleton section opened on 30 July 1849, and by 1 June 1850 there was a through line to Morecambe. The line was leased to the Midland Railway from 1 January 1859. After the opening of the Midland Railway's Settle-Carlisle Line on 1 May 1876, the Leeds–Skipton Line was used by the Midland's London St Pancras to Glasgow express trains. Other trains ran to Morecambe, Carnforth and Hellifield.

=== Partial closure ===
The Beeching cuts of 1963 reduced the services along the Skipton–Colne Line, and on 2 February 1970 this section of line closed. The Skipton - East Lancashire Rail Action Partnership campaigns to reinstate it.

=== Surviving section ===
The Shipley to Skipton Line is still in use as part of the Airedale Line, and also used by trains of the Leeds-Morecambe Line and Settle-Carlisle Line.
