= Leeds–Bradford lines =

UK railway line

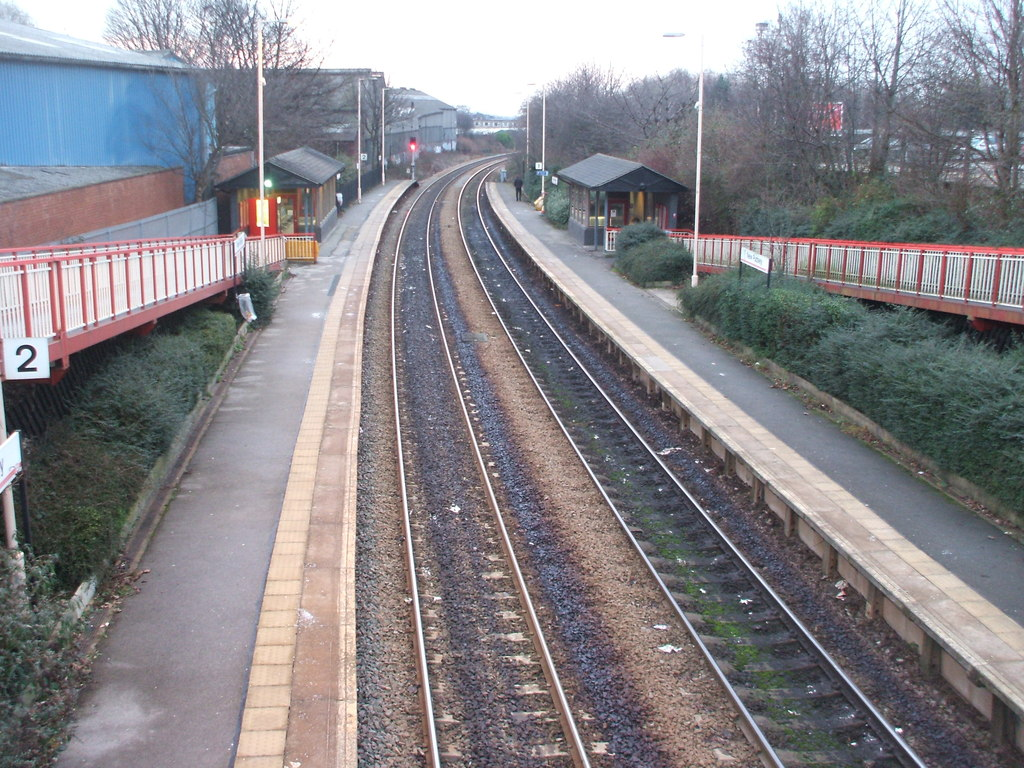
- The line passing through New Pudsey station

Overview
- Owner: Network Rail
- Locale: West Yorkshire; Leeds; Bradford; Yorkshire and the Humber

Technical
- Track gauge: 4 ft 8 1/2 in (1,435 mm) standard gauge
Route map
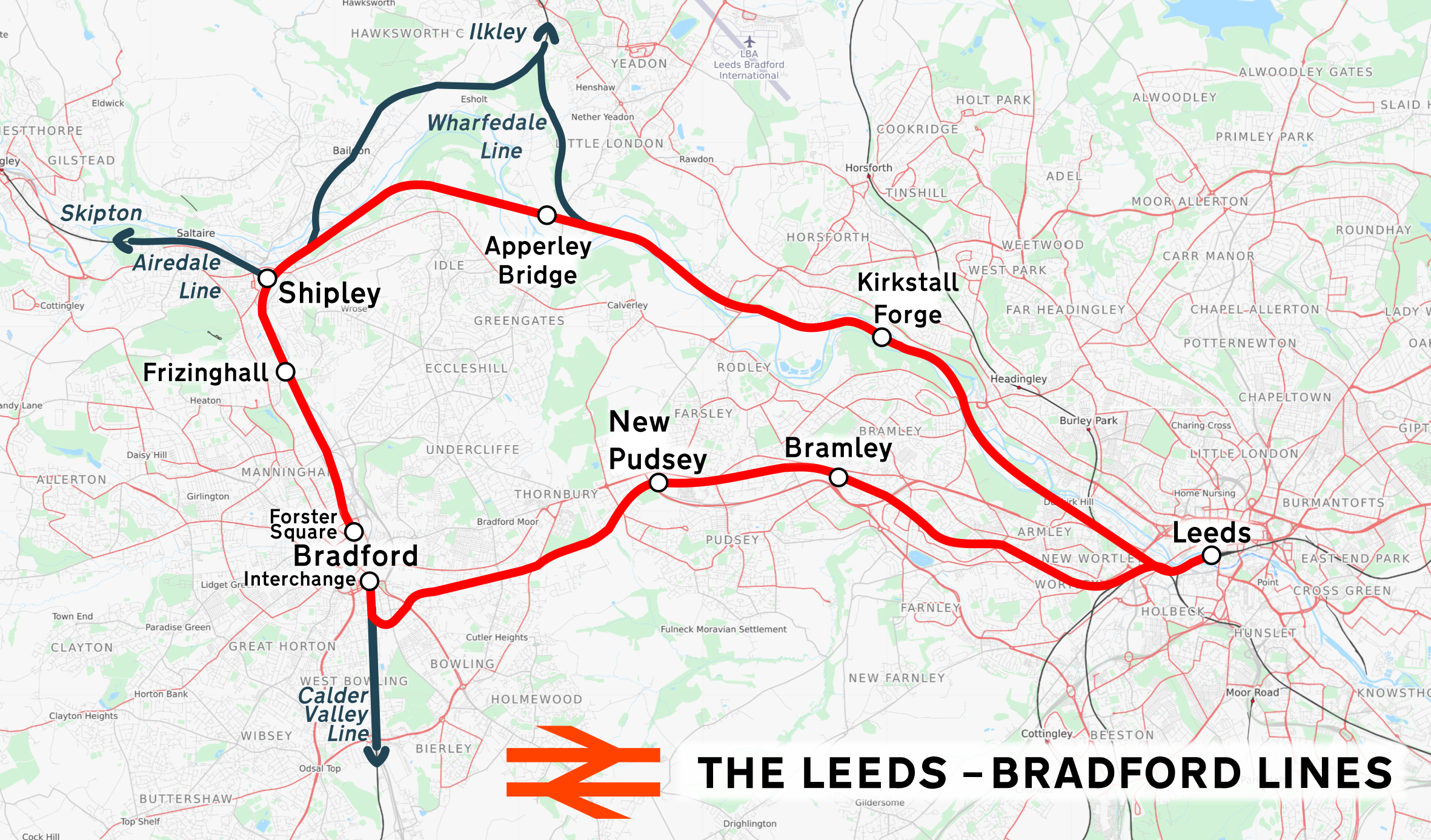
(Click to expand)

The Leeds–Bradford lines are two railway lines connecting the cities of Leeds and Bradford in West Yorkshire, both meeting in Leeds railway station and both included in the West Yorkshire Metro area system of lines.

== Services involved ==
The services are included in those on the following lines:

- Calder Valley line
- Wharfedale line
- Airedale line

== Places served ==
Passenger trains between Leeds railway station and Bradford serve or have served the following places on two routes:

- to Bradford Interchange on the former Great Northern Railway (GNR) line:
  - Holbeck High Level station (closed 1958 when service was still from Leeds Central station)
  - Armley Moor (closed 1966) also served Wortley
  - Bramley (closed 1966, reopened 1983)
  - Stanningley for Farsley (closed 1967)
  - New Pudsey (opened 1967)
  - Laisterdyke (closed 1966)
  - Bradford Interchange station, formerly Bradford Exchange and jointly owned by GNR and the Lancashire and Yorkshire Railway
- to Bradford Forster Square, formerly owned by the Midland Railway:
  - Holbeck Low Level station (closed 1958)
  - Armley Canal Road (closed 1965)
  - Kirkstall (closed 1965)
  - Kirkstall Forge (closed 1905). A new Kirkstall Forge station opened in June 2016.
  - Newlay and Horsforth (closed 1965)
  - Calverley and Rodley (closed 1965)
  - Apperley Bridge (closed 1965). A new Apperley Bridge station opened in December 2015.
  - Shipley
  - Frizinghall (closed 1965, reopened 1987)
  - Manningham (closed 1965)
  - Bradford Forster Square station

West Yorkshire MCards (MetroCards until 2016) are available to the stations currently open (shown in bold letters). Closed stations are shown in normal font.
