= Newlay and Horsforth railway station =

Disused railway station in West Yorkshire, England

Newlay and Horsforth
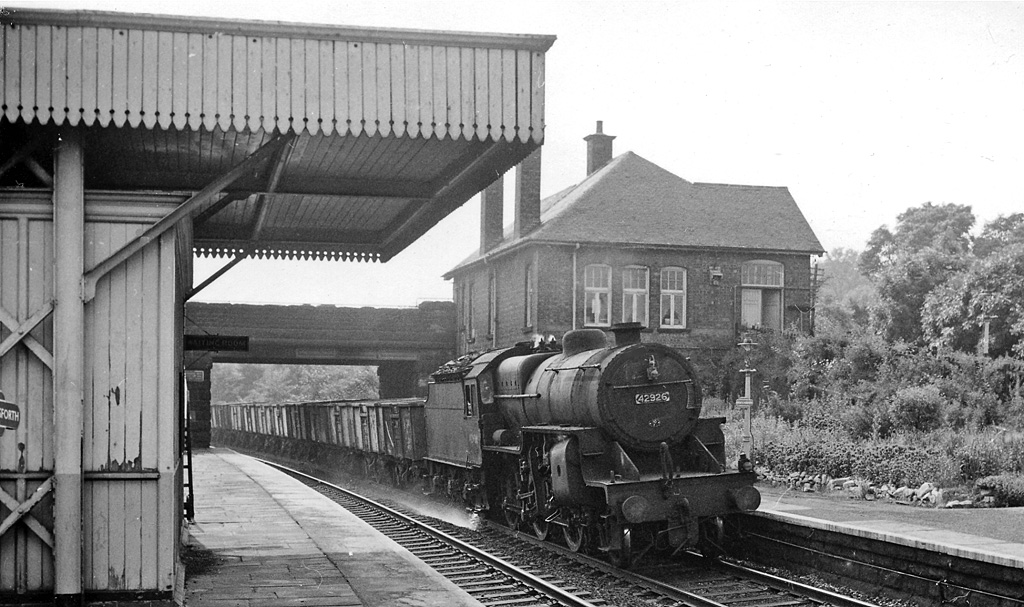
- Eastbound freight train passing through Newlay station in 1964

General information
- Location: Newlay, City of Leeds; England
- Coordinates: 53.827°N 1.637°W
- Grid reference: SE239368
- Platforms: 4

Other information
- Status: Disused

History
- Original company: Leeds and Bradford Railway
- Pre-grouping: Midland Railway
- Post-grouping: London, Midland and Scottish Railway

Key dates
- 1846: Station opened as Newlay
- 1889: Station renamed as Newlay and Horsforth
- 1961: Station renamed as Newlay
- 1965: Station closed
Location

Newlay and Horsforth railway station, until 1889 and from 1961 called Newlay station, was a station on the route of the former Leeds and Bradford Railway (now part of the Airedale Line and the Wharfedale Line), located on the right bank of the River Aire and on the left bank of the Leeds and Liverpool canal between Horsforth in the north and Bramley in the south. It was accessed from Pollard Lane, which still crosses the railway on a bridge there, and served mainly the southern parts of Horsforth in West Yorkshire, England.

== History ==
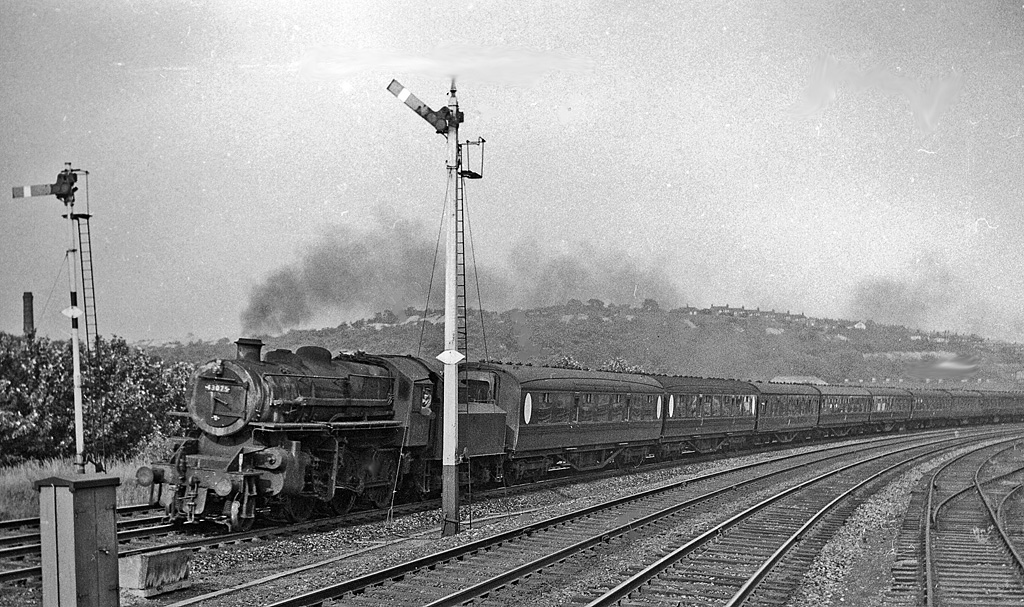
Westbound passenger train approaching Newlay station in 1964

The Leeds and Bradford Railway between Leeds and Bradford (Forster Square) stations was opened in June 1846. Intermediate stations were opened later and Newlay was opened by the in September 1846. The latter was later absorbed by the Midland Railway, which became part of the London, Midland and Scottish Railway upon the 1923 Grouping. In 1905 the station was expanded with a second pair of tracks and a goods shed south of the line. During World War I the station served in particular the National Ordnance Factory in Newlay. Upon nationalisation, the station became part of the network of the Eastern Region of British Railways in 1948. It was closed on 22 March 1965 by the British Railways Board as a consequence of the Beeching Axe, together with the stations Armley Canal Road, Kirkstall, Calverley & Rodley and Apperley Bridge on the same line.

== Current situation ==
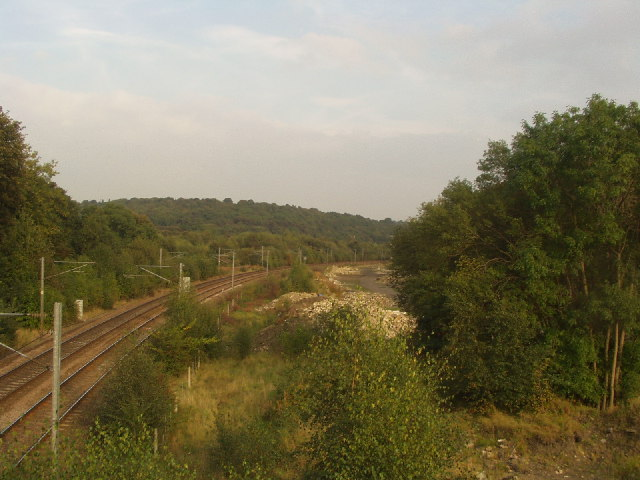
Site of former Newlay station in 2003

The station buildings have been demolished after closure, and the additional tracks built in 1905 were removed in 1967. Only the through tracks remain, which now carry services of the Airedale Line and the Wharfedale Line.

Preceding station	Historical railways	Following station
Calverley and Rodley	Midland Railway; Leeds and Bradford Railway	Kirkstall Forge
