= Kirkstall Forge railway station =

Railway station in Leeds, West Yorkshire

Kirkstall Forge
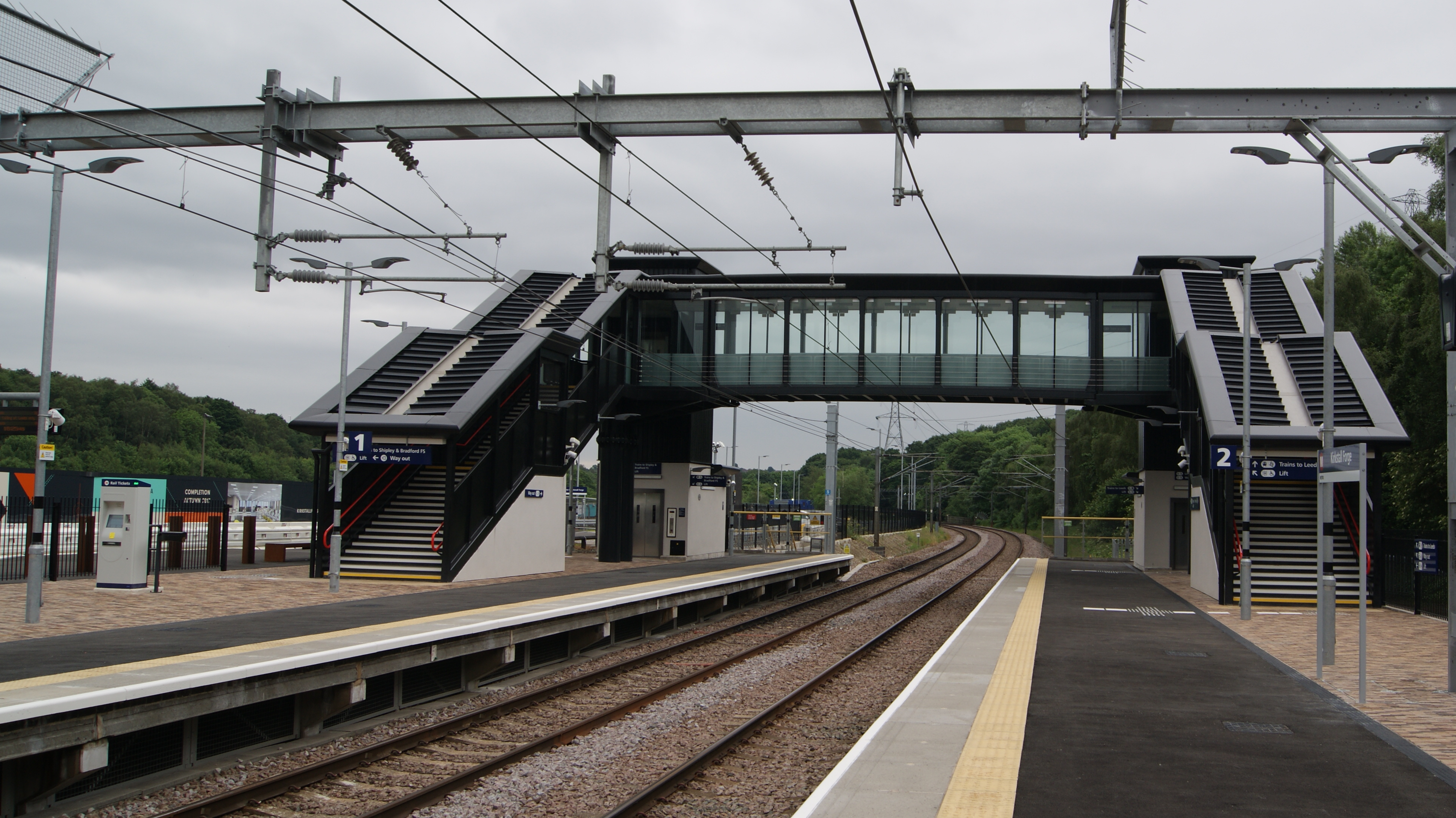
- The platforms and footbridge June 2016

General information
- Location: Kirkstall, City of Leeds; England
- Coordinates: 53.8254°N 1.6270°W
- Grid reference: SE249364
- Manager: Northern Trains
- Transit authority: West Yorkshire (Metro)
- Platforms: 2

Other information
- Station code: KLF
- Fare zone: 2
- Classification: DfT category F2

History
- Original company: Midland Railway

Key dates
- 1 July 1860: Opened
- 31 July 1905: Closed
- 19 June 2016: Reopened

Passengers
- 2021/22: ▲171,986
- 2022/23: ▲249,948
- 2023/24: ▲300,170
- 2024/25: ▲378,822
- 2025/26: ▲377,868
Location
Notes
- Passenger statistics from the Office of Rail and Road

Kirkstall Forge railway station is a station serving the Kirkstall area of Leeds, West Yorkshire, England. It is on the Leeds to Bradford Line between Leeds and Shipley and was opened on 19 June 2016, near the site of an earlier station with the same name. It is between Leeds to the east and Apperley Bridge and Guiseley to the west and northwest respectively, sited 199 miles 25 chains (320.8 km) miles from St Pancras (measured via Cudworth).

== History ==
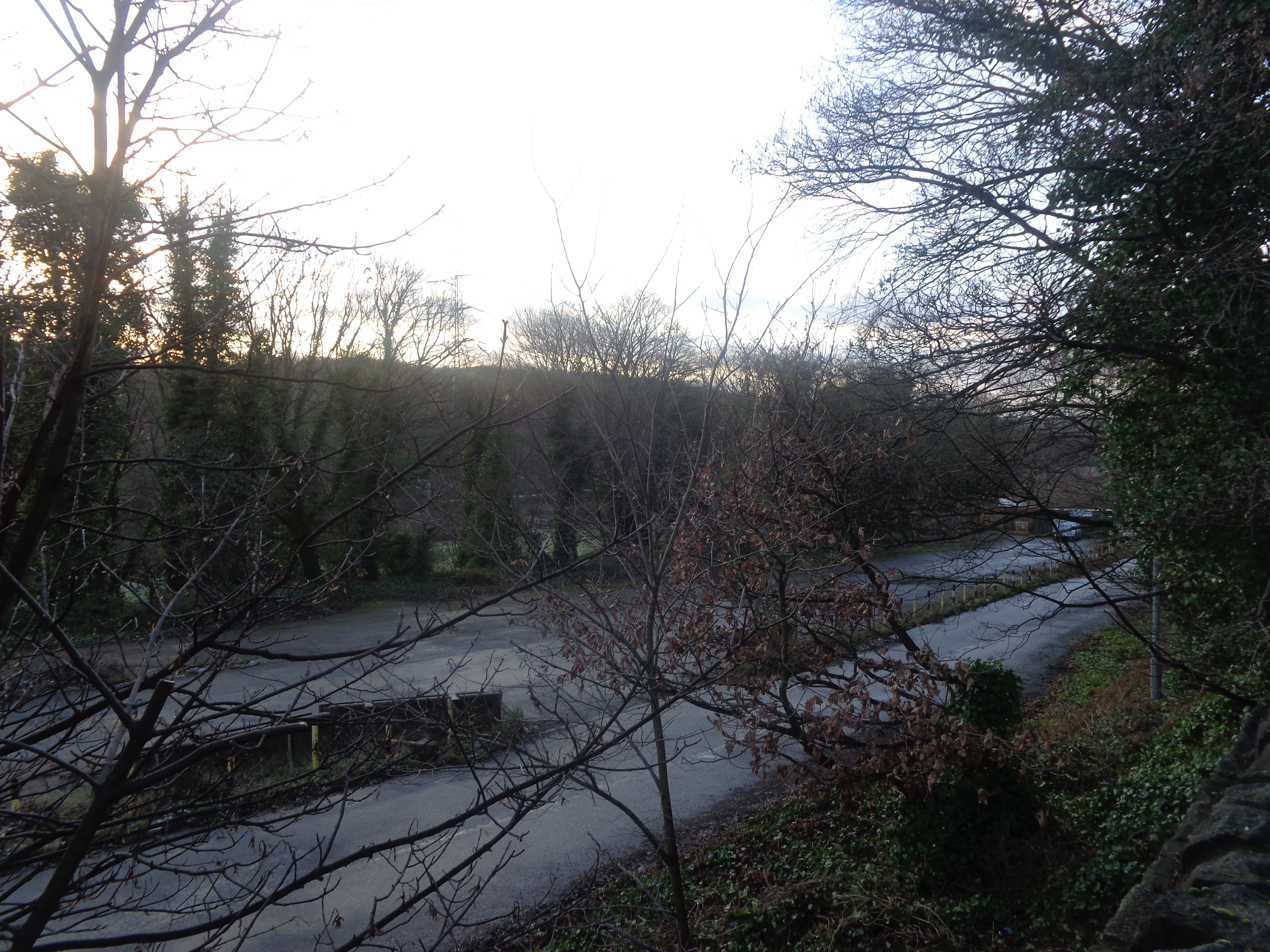
The derelict site of Kirkstall Forge seen in December 2014.

The original station opened on 2 July 1860 and closed on 1 August 1905. During 1905, the line between Leeds and Shipley was quadrupled, which involved slewing the line and building new bridges in several places. It was not considered worthwhile rebuilding it when the line was diverted onto a new bridge over the canal. A new station could provide opportunities for travel when space became available with the Kirkstall Forge Engineering closing in stages during the 1980s, 1990s and the early 2000s.

In 1999, Metro announced that Kirkstall Forge and Apperley Bridge were among five new or reopened stations which they wished to see achieved over the ensuing five years.

In July 2007, Leeds City Council approved a planning application to redevelop the Kirkstall Forge site, and the developer, Commercial Estates Group, committed £4 million to build a railway station and provide new rolling stock.

In September 2008, the West Yorkshire PTE announced that the Yorkshire & Humber Regional Transport Board had approved funding for its "rail growth programme" which included stations at Apperley Bridge and Kirkstall Forge. A public exhibition of the plans took place in June 2009 with the planning application submitted to Leeds City Council in March 2010 and approval being granted in June 2010.

Despite significant private sector funding, the larger Rail Growth Programme including Apperley Bridge was listed as a schemes under government review in June 2010.

Following the Comprehensive Spending Review in Autumn 2010 the Leeds Rail Growth Package was included in the "Development" pool of schemes. Metro submitted a "Best & Final Funding Bid" in September 2011 and funding was confirmed November 2011 as part of the National Infrastructure Plan.

On 29 May 2014 the Department for Transport committed £9.5 million from a total of £16 million towards the Leeds Rail Growth scheme which included both Kirkstall Forge and Apperley Bridge stations. Works began in November 2014 by designers Amey Plc and the principal contractor C Spencers Ltd on behalf of Network Rail with completion of both stations expected by winter 2015. Partly due to flooding, work for the wider non-rail Kirkstall site ran behind schedule and its opening was delayed until June 2016. The new station, 230 yards (210 m) west of the site of the original, opened on 19 June 2016. Metro, the Passenger Transport Executive for West Yorkshire, opened the station having already overseen the opening of nearby Apperley Bridge in December 2015.

== Facilities ==
The station has two platforms, with a footbridge and lifts linking them. A bus stop, 127 car parking spaces and secure cycle storage were also constructed along with the station. Ticket vending machines are available and there are digital information screens and a P.A. system provided for train running information provision.

== Passenger volume ==
Passenger volume at Kirkstall Forge
	2016–17	2017–18	2018–19	2019–20	2020–21	2021–22	2022–23	2023–24	2024–25	2025–26
Entries and exits	94,536	150,208	232,386	289,528	57,130	171,986	249,948	300,170	378,822	377,868

The statistics cover twelve month periods that start in April.

== Services ==
A Northern Trains service to Leeds calls at the station

Though it is sited on the Airedale and Wharfedale lines, the station was to be served by trains between Leeds and Bradford Forster Square providing two trains per hour in each direction. The May 2016 timetable, published by Network Rail and Metro, shows the station as being served by one train per hour between Leeds and Ilkley, with a limited number of additional calls (peak hour & late night) provided by Airedale Line services to/from Skipton & Bradford. On Sundays Leeds to Bradford Forster Square trains call once per hour each way.

In November 2017 the frequency of services was raised in the House of Commons by the local Member of Parliament and plans were subsequently announced to double the frequency between Kirkstall Forge and Leeds to 2 trains per hour from 20 May 2018 (though services were cut back again for several months in 2020 due to the COVID-19 pandemic).

Services to/from Ilkley no longer now stop at Kirkstall Forge as a result of this change, with regular timetabled calls now provided by the Leeds - Bradford Forster Square trains (Ilkley connections are now available at Shipley). Certain Skipton services do stop in the weekday peak and after 19:30 Mondays to Saturdays when the Bradford - Leeds service does not operate. Sunday services remain unchanged.

Preceding station	National Rail	Following station
Guiseley	Northern Trains Wharfedale Line	Leeds
Apperley Bridge	Northern Trains Airedale Line	Leeds
Apperley Bridge	Northern Trains Leeds-Bradford Line	Leeds
	Historical railways	
Newlay & Horsforth	Midland Railway; Leeds and Bradford Railway	Kirkstall
