= Idle railway station (Leeds and Bradford Railway) =

Disused railway station in West Yorkshire, England

Idle

General information
- Location: Idle, City of Bradford; England
- Coordinates: 53.845770°N 1.743960°W
- Grid reference: SE169388

Other information
- Status: Disused

History
- Original company: Leeds and Bradford Railway

Key dates
- 1847: opened
- 1848: closed
Location

Idle railway station was a short-lived station serving Idle, near Bradford, West Yorkshire, England.

It was built by the Leeds and Bradford Railway in 1847, but it was closed the next year. It was located near the west entrance of the Thackley Tunnel. This station was very much closer to Thackley than to Idle.

Later, in 1875 another Idle station was built, on the Great Northern Railway's Shipley Windhill Line.

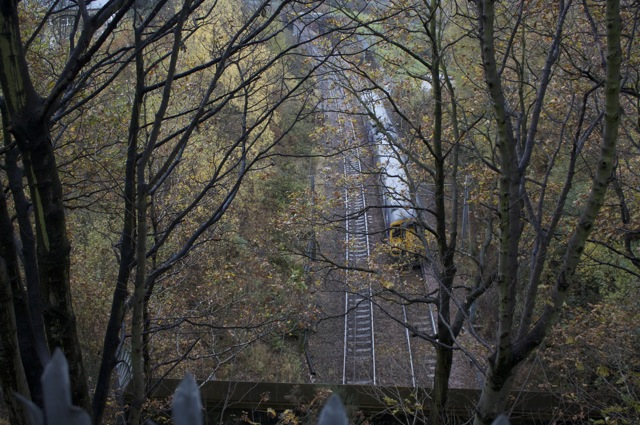
Train near the location of the former station

Preceding station	Historical railways	Following station
Shipley	Leeds and Bradford; 1847–1848	Apperley Bridge
