= Calverley and Rodley railway station =

Disused railway station in West Yorkshire, England

Calverley and Rodley
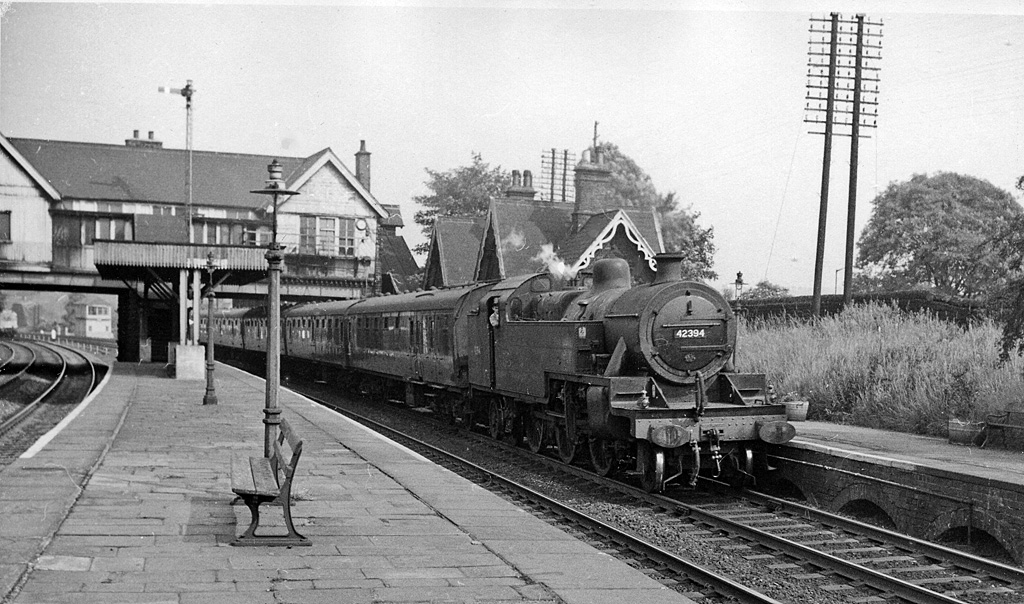
- Express to Bradford in Calverley and Rodley Station, 1964

General information
- Location: Calverley, City of Leeds; England
- Coordinates: 53.83°N 1.665°W
- Grid reference: SE 222 371
- Platforms: 1 island, 2 outer

Other information
- Status: Disused

History
- Original company: Leeds and Bradford Railway
- Pre-grouping: Midland Railway
- Post-grouping: London, Midland and Scottish Railway

Key dates
- 1846: opened
- 22 March 1965: closed to passengers
- 7 October 1968: closed to freight
Location

Calverley and Rodley railway station, originally called Calverley Bridge Station for the nearby river crossing, is a closed railway station on the line of the former Leeds and Bradford Railway (whose route now forms part of the Leeds to Bradford Lines, the Airedale Line, and the Wharfedale Line), near the villages of Calverley and Rodley, City of Leeds, West Yorkshire, England. It was situated on the left bank of the River Aire under Calverley Lane. The location now belongs to Horsforth.

== History ==
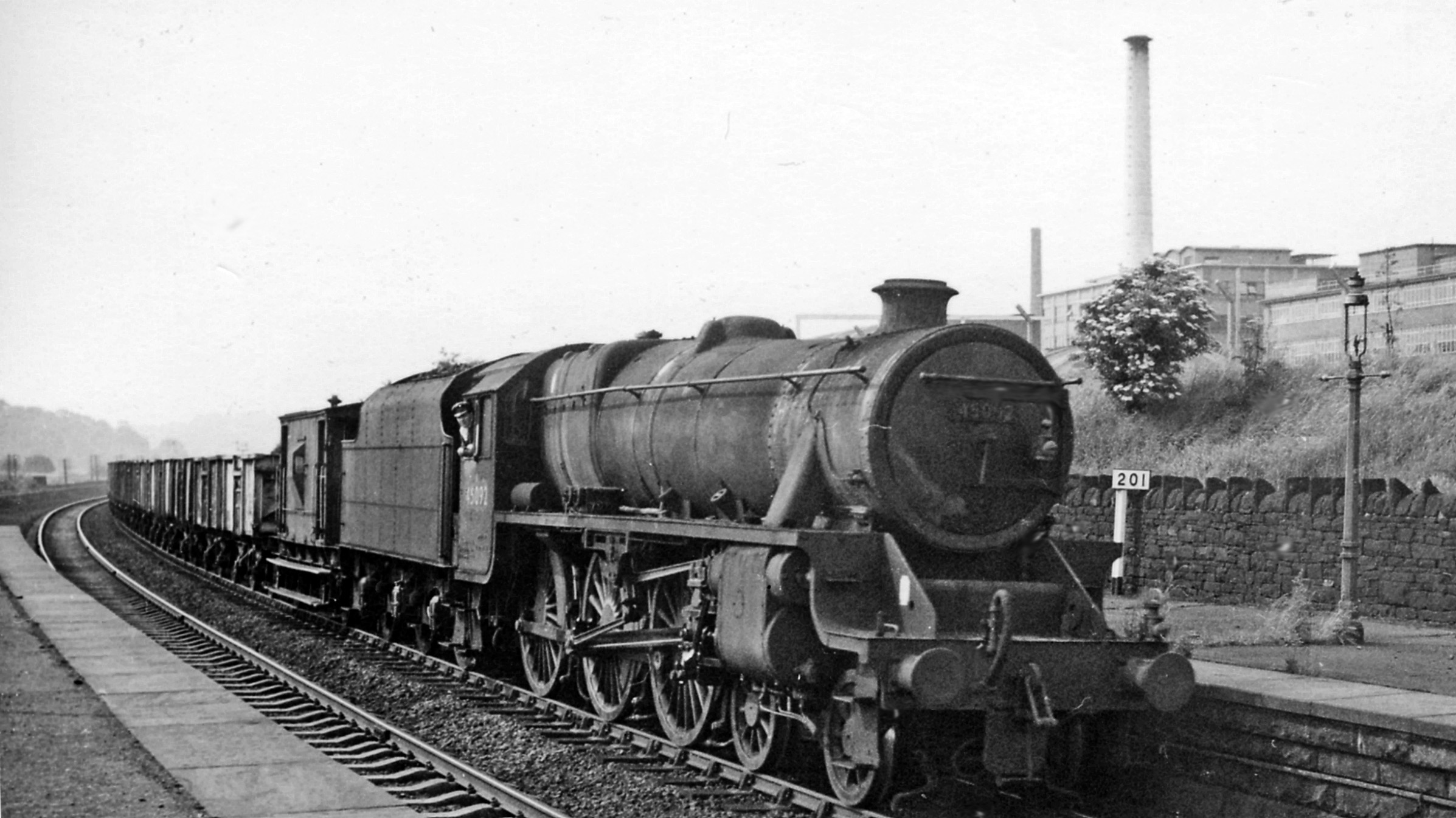
Westbound freight train passing Calverley and Rodley station, 1964

The station opened in 1846 shortly after the start of services on the Leeds and Bradford Railway. It had one island platform, two outer platforms, and some tracks serving a goods shed and a loading stage. It fell victim to the Beeching Axe, closing to passengers in March 1965 and to freight in 1968 (along with the other intermediate stations between Leeds & Shipley).

== Current situation ==
While all tracks except for those of the mainline passing through the station site have been removed, the layout can still be inferred from the location of buildings in the former station grounds. The goods shed has been integrated into a warehouse complex used by local businesses, while the station building appears to be used as a private residence. The nearby Stanhope Hotel, featured in the book Welcome Inn, is being demolished in 2016, and several houses will be built on the site adjacent to the former station.

Preceding station	Historical railways	Following station
Apperley Bridge	Midland Railway; Leeds and Bradford Railway	Newlay and Horsforth
