= Apperley Bridge =

Village in West Yorkshire, England

Coordinates: 53.836°N 1.712°W

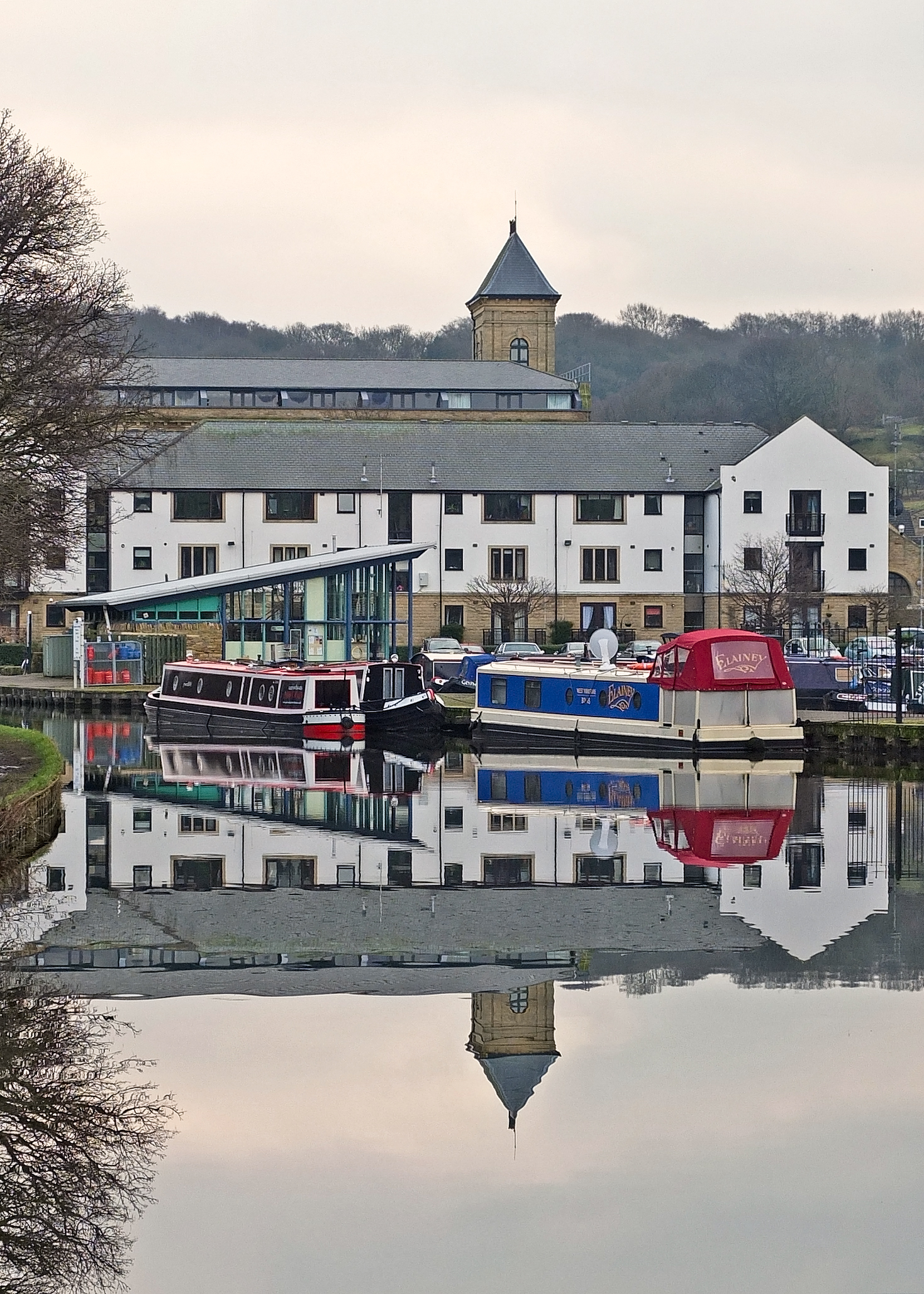
- Apperley Bridge Marina

- Location within West Yorkshire
- OS grid reference: SE193376
- Metropolitan borough: City of Bradford
- Metropolitan county: West Yorkshire
- Region: Yorkshire and the Humber
- Country: England
- Sovereign state: United Kingdom
- Post town: BRADFORD
- Postcode district: BD10
- Dialling code: 01274
- Police: West Yorkshire
- Fire: West Yorkshire
- Ambulance: Yorkshire
- UK Parliament: Bradford East

Apperley Bridge is a village in the metropolitan borough of the City of Bradford, in West Yorkshire, England in the Idle and Thackley Ward. Apperley Bridge is north-east of Bradford on the boundary with the City of Leeds bounded in the east by Carr Beck and to the south by Greengates. The village straddles the Leeds and Liverpool Canal and the River Aire. It takes its name from the old bridge over the river on Apperley Lane.

Parts of Rawdon in Leeds of similar character are included in the BD10 Apperley Bridge postal district.

== History ==
The bridge from which the village takes its name was built in the late-16th century or early-17th century. In 1777 a stone arched bridge was built on Harrogate Road over the canal but the present bridge dates from 1936 and has since been widened.

From 1846 until its closure in 1965, Apperley Bridge railway station was situated across the boundary in Rawdon. Off Tenterfields, close to the canal, were four 19th-century mills: Apperdale Mill (formerly Dyehouse Mill), Oaklea Mills, Valley Mills (Canal Mills) and Whitfield Mill. Apperdale Mill and Oaklea Mills survive close to the canal basin, which is now a pleasure boat marina.

Since the 1990s, housing has been built in the Tenterfields area between the canal up to Greengates. Valley Mills and Whitfield Mills were demolished to make way for the development, while Apperdale Mill and Oaklea Mill were converted into residential units. Apperley Bridge has a strong thriving local community group – Greengates and Apperley Bridge community volunteers – who organise weekly litter picking and community events/activities. Hammonds sauce factory on Harrogate Road close to the canal has been replaced by modern development.

In the 2000s the village was considered for conservation area status but this was turned down, partly because many of its older buildings already had listed building status.

== Governance ==
Apperley Bridge is in the Idle and Thackley ward of Bradford City Council.

== Economy ==
On Apperley Lane is the head office of JCT600 vehicle hire and dealership. Next to the Harrogate Road bridge over the Leeds and Liverpool Canal is Apperley Bridge Quarries. On the canal itself is Apperley Bridge Marina with a cafe, office, and chandler operated by Calder Valley Marine. Regarding leisure and tourism there are several cafes and historic public house / restaurants in the area and the possibility of towpath and field walks.

== Landmarks ==
Historic Apperley Bridge village is a collection of buildings and groups of buildings separated by green space, it does not have a square, green, or commercial area that could be identified as a focal centre for the village. The old bridge from which Apperley Bridge takes its name is of ashlar construction with two arches and a partially obliterated inscription by the road edge. Numerous farm buildings, barns, and previously canal related buildings along Apperley Road near Milman Bridge have listed building status. The Dog and Gun, The George and Dragon,^{*} and The Stansfield Arms^{*} public houses are historic former houses, farmhouses and barns. The Woodhouse Grove Methodist Church (grade II listed), and the Moody Cow on Harrogate Road in Rawdon are notable large buildings.

The canal marina has a modern steel, glass, and stone cafe, office and chandler. Close to the marina is the base of an original canal side wharf crane. There are numerous listed buildings in Apperley Bridge to be found on Apperley Lane, Apperley Road, Laburnum Place, the Leeds and Liverpool Canal, Harrogate Road and Waterloo Crescent.

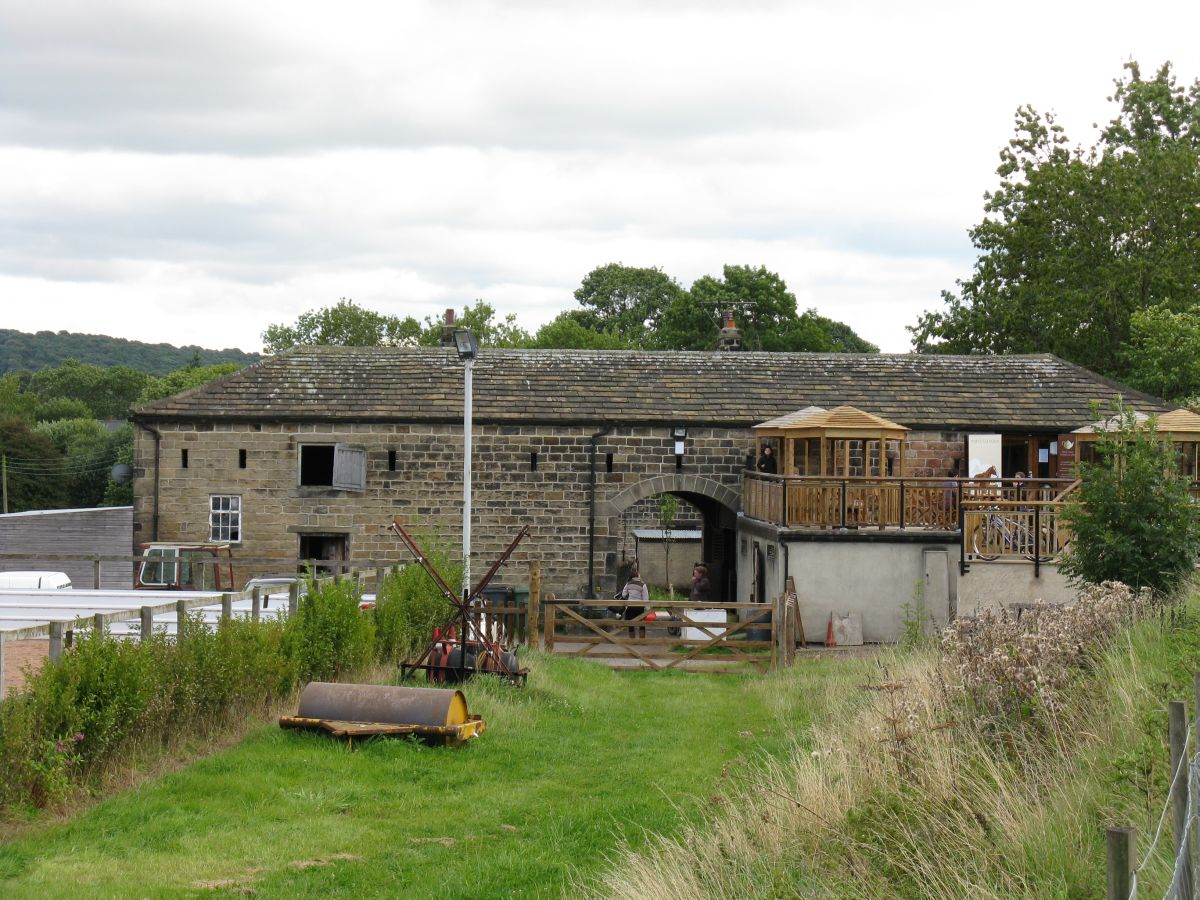
Bottom Farm barn^{*}

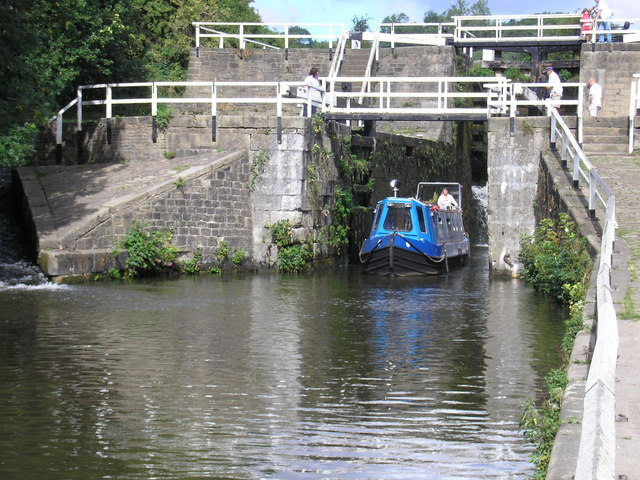
Dobson locks^{*}

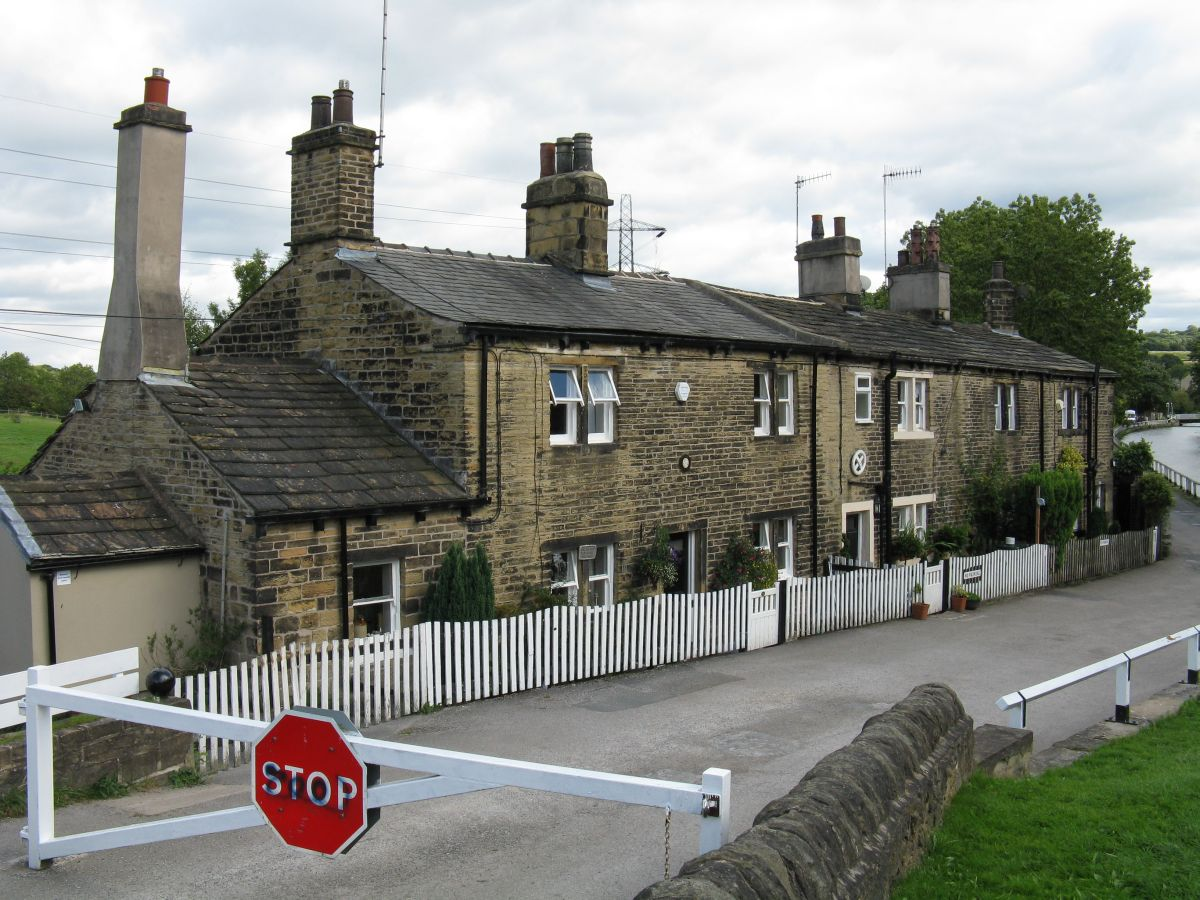
Dobson Lock cottages^{*}

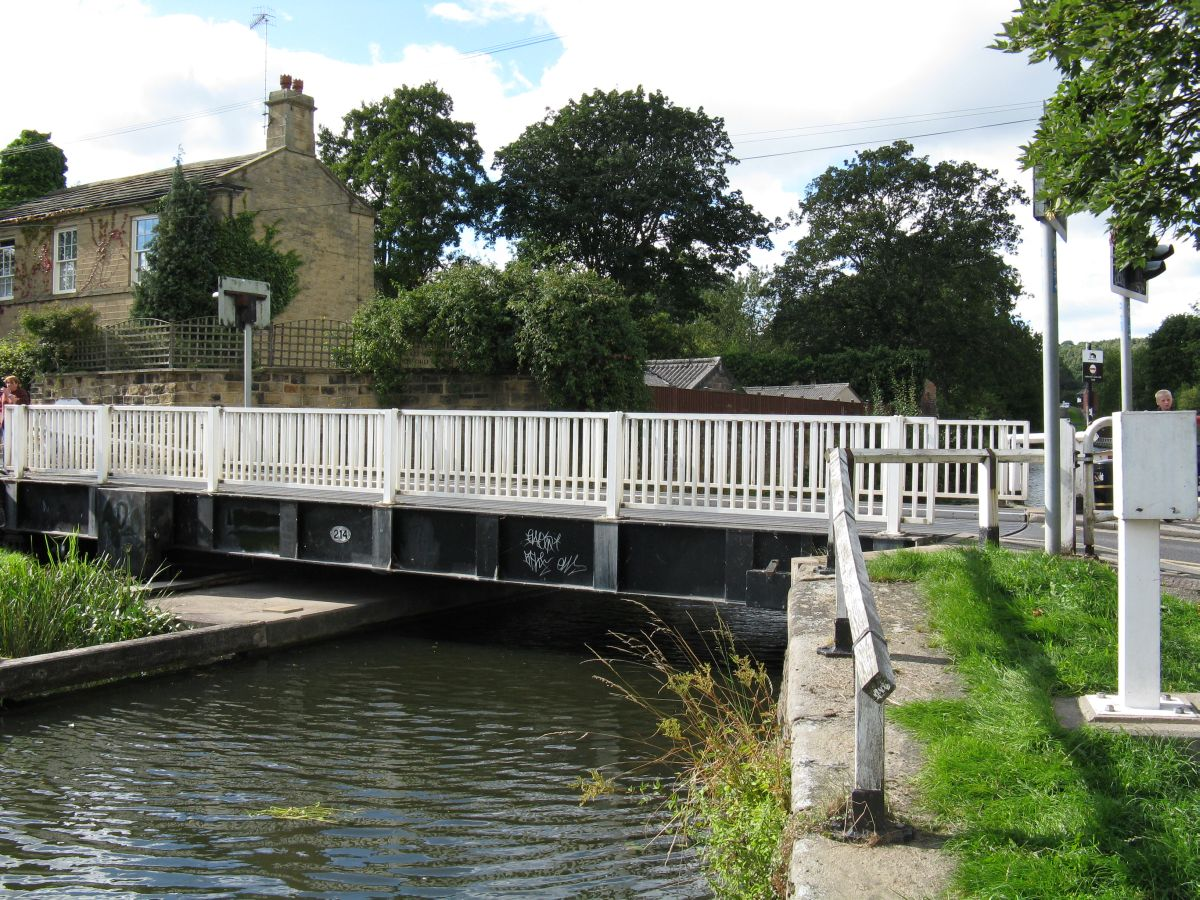
Apperley Road and Milman (swing) Bridge

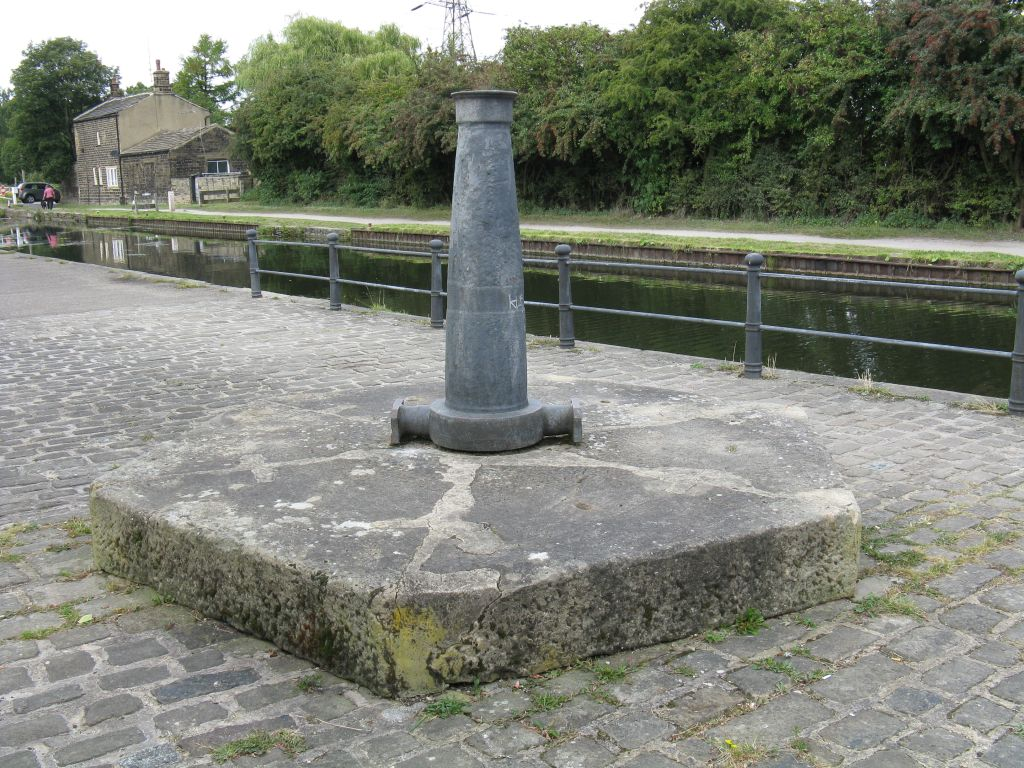
The base of a wharfe crane close to Apperley Bridge Marina

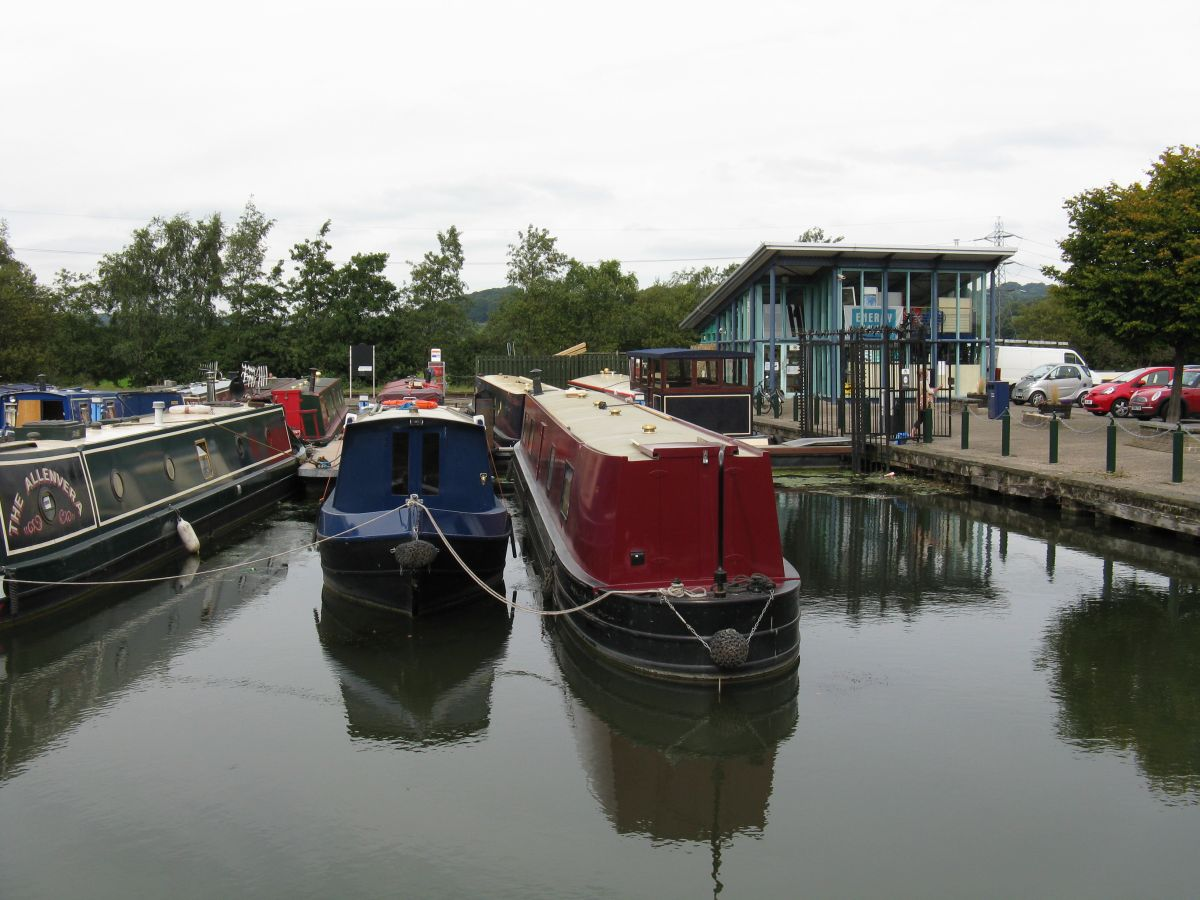
Apperley Bridge Marina and chandlers

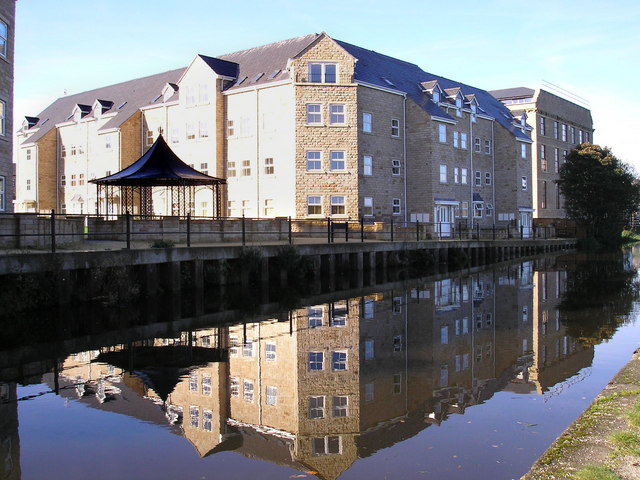
Canal side flats and mill conversion

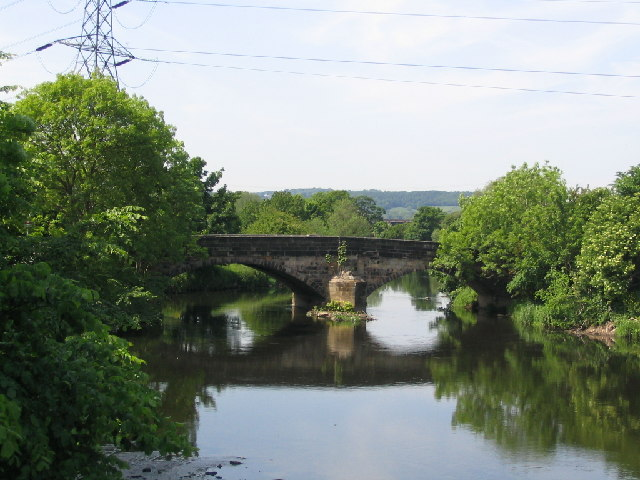
Apperley bridge^{*} on the River Aire

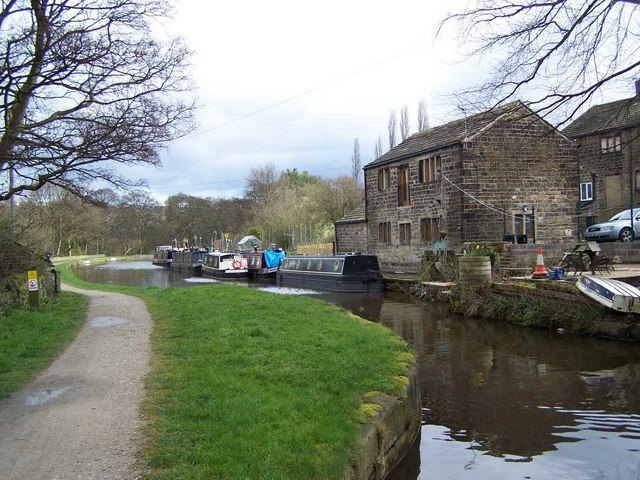
Swiftcraft Moorings, Leeds
^{*} listed building

== Education ==
There are no schools in Apperley Bridge itself, though to the north of the village is Woodhouse Grove School, originally founded as an all-boys school for the sons of Methodist ministers and now a fee paying private day and boarding school. Greengates Primary Academy, operated by Delta Trust, is located to the south of the village in Greengates and is the main primary school for Apperley Bridge. The nearest secondary school is Immanuel College in Idle.

== Sport ==
Apperley Bridge's sports (cricket) ground is on Apperley Lane north of the old Apperley Bridge and there are other sports grounds or playing fields close by between the canal and river. The section known as Rawdon meadows provides the training ground and facilities for Bradford City A.F.C.

== Transport ==
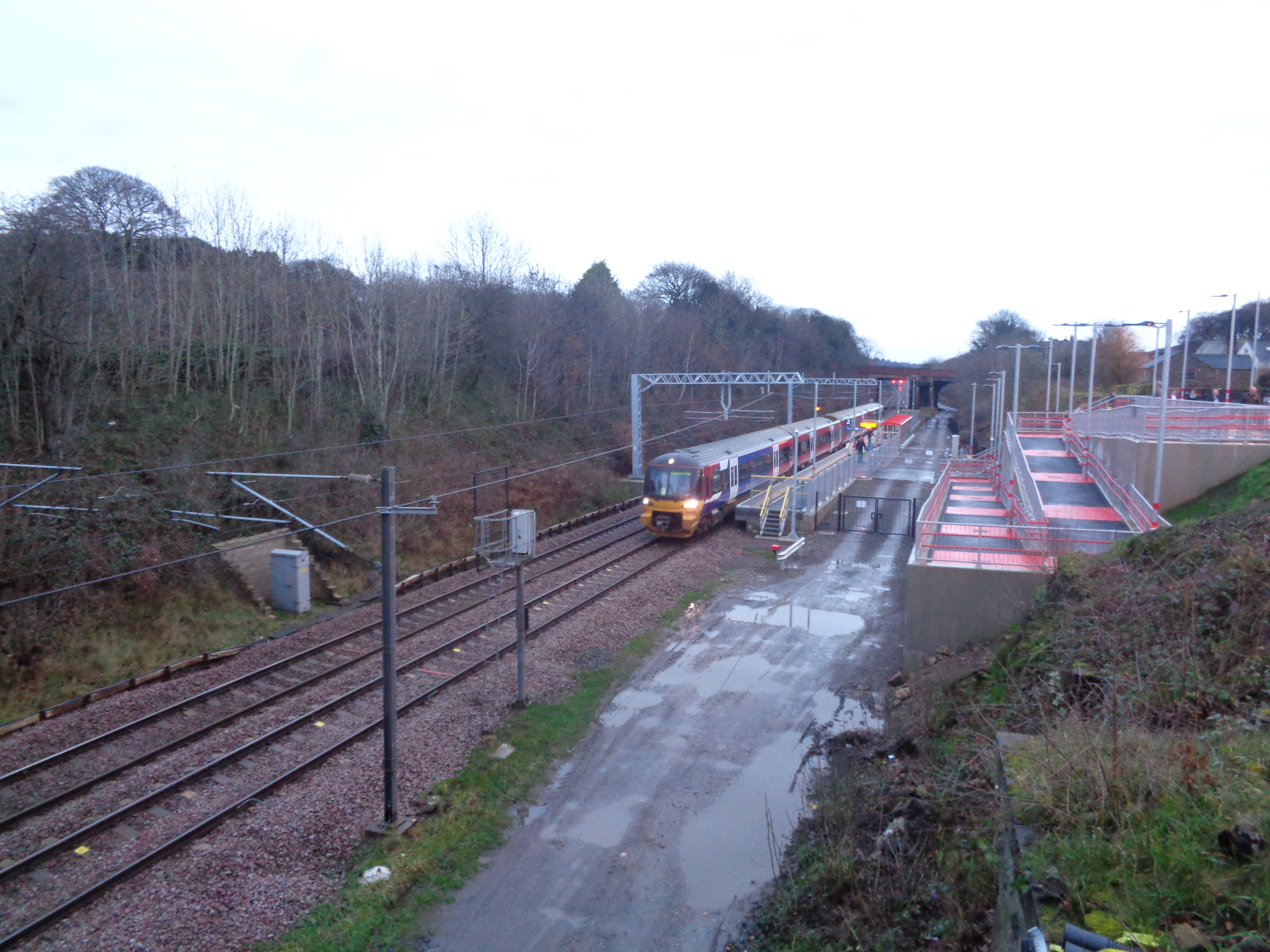
Apperley Bridge railway station

The Leeds and Liverpool Canal runs east west through Apperley Bridge and is used by pleasure craft.

The Airedale rail line runs east west down the Aire valley, through the north of Apperley Bridge. Apperley Bridge railway station has one train running every two hours on week days and every hour on Sundays in both directions on the Leeds to Bradford line and feeder bus services are in place.

The main road through the area is the A658 Harrogate Road – Apperley Lane.

== See also ==
- Listed buildings in Idle and Thackley
