= Kirkstall railway station =

Disused railway station in West Yorkshire, England

Kirkstall
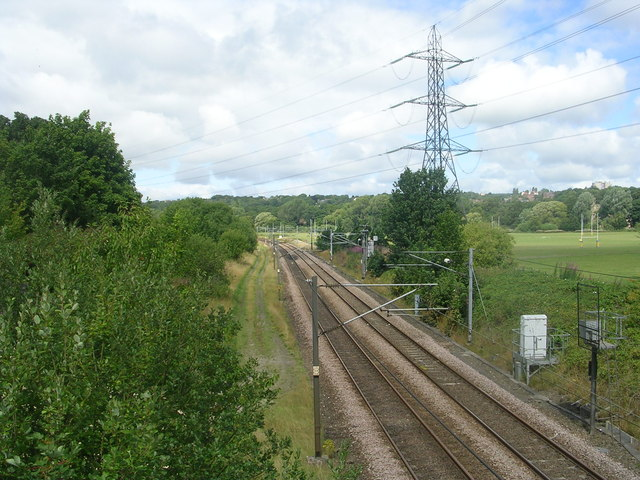
- Last location of the station north of Kirkstall Bridge (2011)

General information
- Location: Kirkstall, City of Leeds; England
- Coordinates: 53.8151°N 1.6073°W
- Grid reference: SE258356
- Platforms: 2

Other information
- Status: Disused

History
- Original company: Leeds and Bradford Railway
- Pre-grouping: Midland Railway
- Post-grouping: London, Midland and Scottish Railway

Key dates
- 1846: Opened
- 1906: Relocated
- 22 March 1965: Closed
Location

Kirkstall was a railway station in Kirkstall, City of Leeds, West Yorkshire. It was located between Kirkstall Forge and Armley Canal Road on the right bank of the River Aire.

== History ==
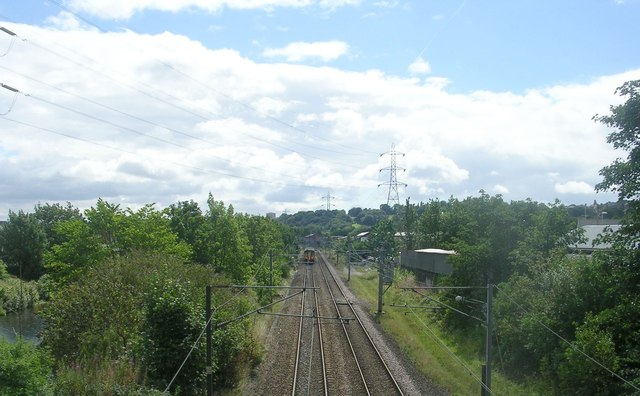
Original location of the station south of Kirkstall Bridge

The station was opened by the Midland Railway in 1860 and closed in March 1965 as part of the Beeching cuts. Originally located south of Kirkstall Bridge next to today's Wyther Lane, it had been moved north of it by 1906. It was demolished after closure and no trace of the station now remains. However, the goods shed, south of Kirkstall Bridge, still exists.

Preceding station	Historical railways	Following station
Kirkstall Forge	Midland Railway; Leeds and Bradford Railway	Armley Canal Road
