= Newlay =

Suburb of Horsforth, West Yorkshire, England

Coordinates: 53.830°N 1.637°W

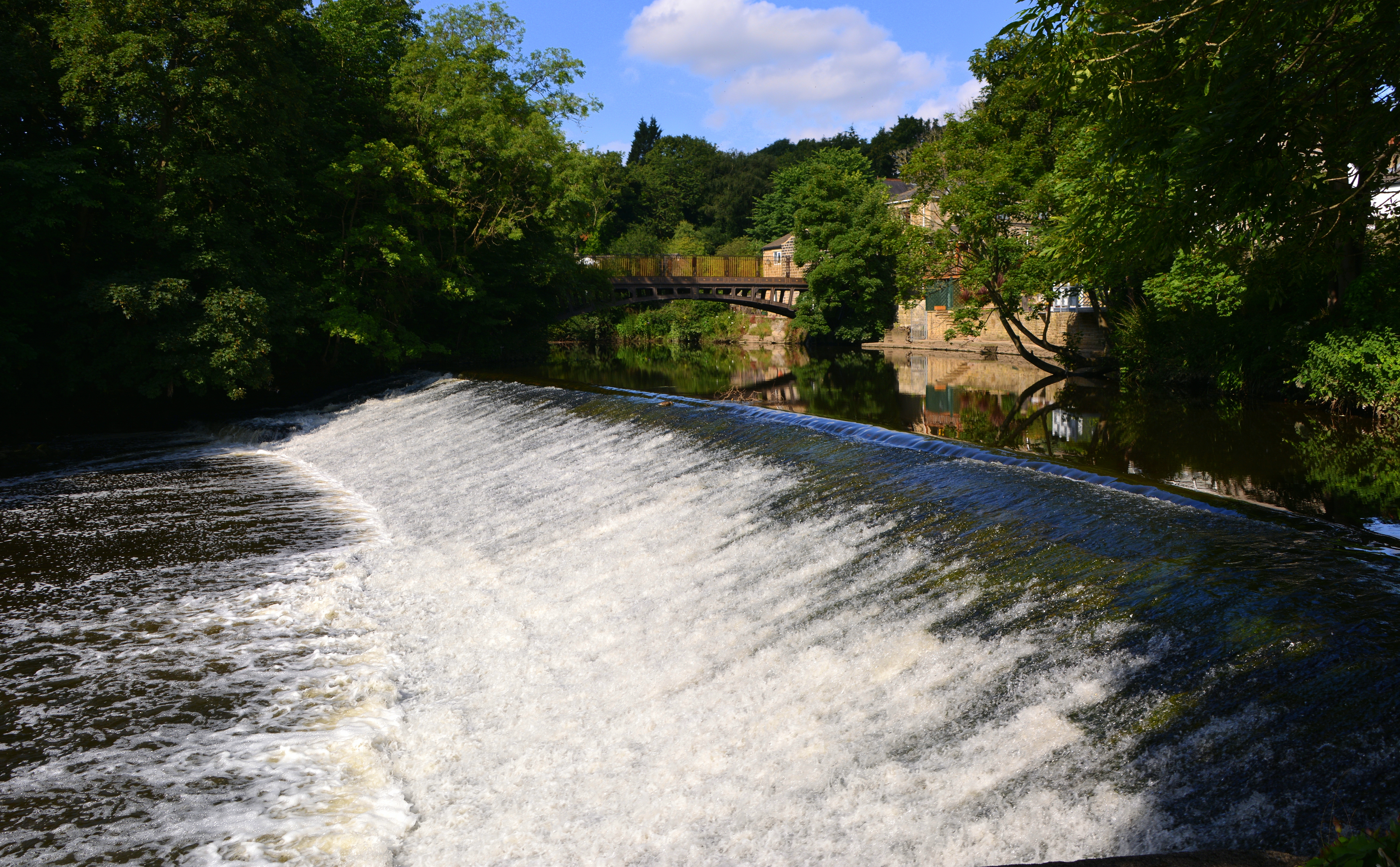
- The weir on the River Aire at Newlay (pictured prior to its collapse in 2021), with Newlay Bridge in the background

- Location within West Yorkshire
- OS grid reference: SE239367
- Civil parish: Horsforth parish
- Metropolitan borough: City of Leeds
- Metropolitan county: West Yorkshire
- Region: Yorkshire and the Humber
- Country: England
- Sovereign state: United Kingdom
- Post town: LEEDS
- Postcode district: LS13
- Police: West Yorkshire
- Fire: West Yorkshire
- Ambulance: Yorkshire

Newlay is a suburb of Horsforth, in West Yorkshire, England. Originally a hamlet, it is now part of Horsforth parish in the City of Leeds District, and has its own conservation area. Newlay is situated on the Leeds and Liverpool Canal and the River Aire, some 5 miles (8 km) north west of Leeds city centre.

== History ==
Newlay (or sometimes Newlay Bridge) was a hamlet historically in the wapentake of Skyrack, and was listed as Newlath, New Laith, or New Laithes, which was the name of the grange in the area. The site is possibly the location of the original Horse Ford across the River Aire, which gave the town of Horsforth its name. The site has also been recorded as Newlaithbrigge in 1587, indicating the existence of a bridge in the 16th century.

The modern suburb of Newlay is considered part of Horsforth, (adjacent to Newlay to the north), and is 5 miles (8 km) north west of the city centre in Leeds. Newlay is part of the parish and ward of Horsforth, although anything on the south side of the River Aire is in the Bramley and Stanningley Ward. Mapping shows Newlay as straddling the river, which forms a natural boundary between wards and parishes. In 1981, most of the suburb north of the river was designated as a conservation area.

The Leeds Liverpool Canal is routed through the south end of Newlay. The canal opened in 1777 and the locks on the canal at Newlay are grade II listed. The Leeds and Liverpool Canal SSSI is part of the southern area of Newlay.

The River Aire flows through the southern part of the suburb, alongside the Leeds Liverpool Canal, and the railway lines between Leeds, Ilkley, Bradford and Skipton. In February 2021, Storm Christoph severely damaged the 17th century grade II listed weir on the River Aire. The failure of the weir was attributed to the construction of a fish pass at the Western end of the weir. Vibrations caused by the excavating equipment are thought to have weakened the weir structure. The weir was constructed in 1690 to channel water into a goit for the Kirkstall Forge works. It is thought that an original goit at this location was built by monks at nearby Kirkstall Abbey to funnel water needed for their corn mill. A large factory was built between the river, railway and canal, which suffered from accidents and fires. A fire in 1885, when the plant was operating as a dye works and tar distillery, required the Leeds Fire Brigade to attend and extinguish it. Although it was grade II listed, a fire in 2003 ruined the building, and it was demolished soon afterwards, with a housing estate being built on the site.

The railway through Newlay was opened to traffic on 30 June 1846, however, the station at Newlay, did not open until 7 September 1847. The initial push of the railway was for connectivity between Leeds and Bradford, with intermediate stations being built after opening of the line. The railway provided access for those who wanted to work in Leeds but live in a more rural location close to the city. This accelerated house building near to the station, but this lessened somewhat in the 1890s when trams were available on the main road into Leeds, which attracted some of the customers away from the railway.

A church (st Margaret's) was built in 1891 on the south side of Pollard Bridge. It burnt down in 1908, and a replacement was built soon afterwards, but this was closed in 1956, and services were moved to another church in Bramley. In 1916, a munitions factory was opened in Newlay, and like the others opened in and around Leeds at that time, it was staffed by female workers.

== Pollard Bridge ==
Crossings were known at Newlay since at least Anglo-Saxon times, but the first recorded instance of a bridge was in the late 12th century. In 1615, Sir John Howley appealed to the residents of Leathley to contribute to the "..building of a bridge over the water of Aire at Newlath.."

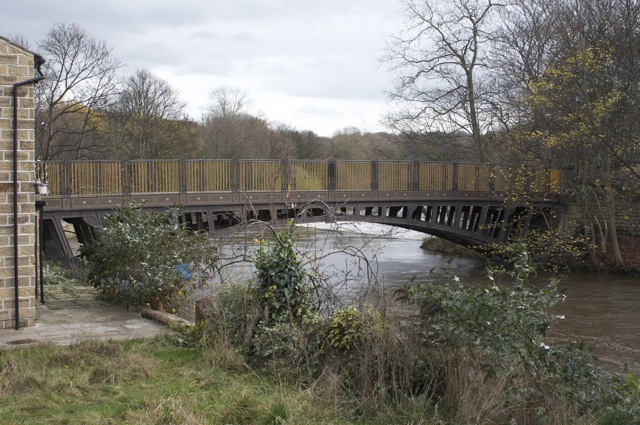
Pollard Bridge (Newlay Bridge)

Pollard Bridge (also known as Newlay Bridge), spans the River Aire at Newlay and was built at the behest of John Pollard. The bridge has four 75 feet (23 m) cast iron arch ribs aligned together in a row. Cast and erected in 1819, the bridge was made by Aydon & Ewell in Bradford, a firm which later became part of the Low Moor Ironworks. The bridge replaced an earlier structure dating from 1783, (and a previous one was said to have been built in 1616) which connected Pollard's factories on the south of the river with the Leeds to Horsforth turnpike. The bridge cost £1,500 (equivalent to £113,684 in 2025), and a toll was charged at a rate of half-a-penny, which recouped £600 (equivalent to £45,474 in 2025) per year (1890). The bridge was still open to vehicular traffic in the early 1980s, but was pedestrianised in 1984. Pollard Bridge is grade II* listed.
