= Apperley Bridge railway station =

Railway station in West Yorkshire, England

Apperley Bridge
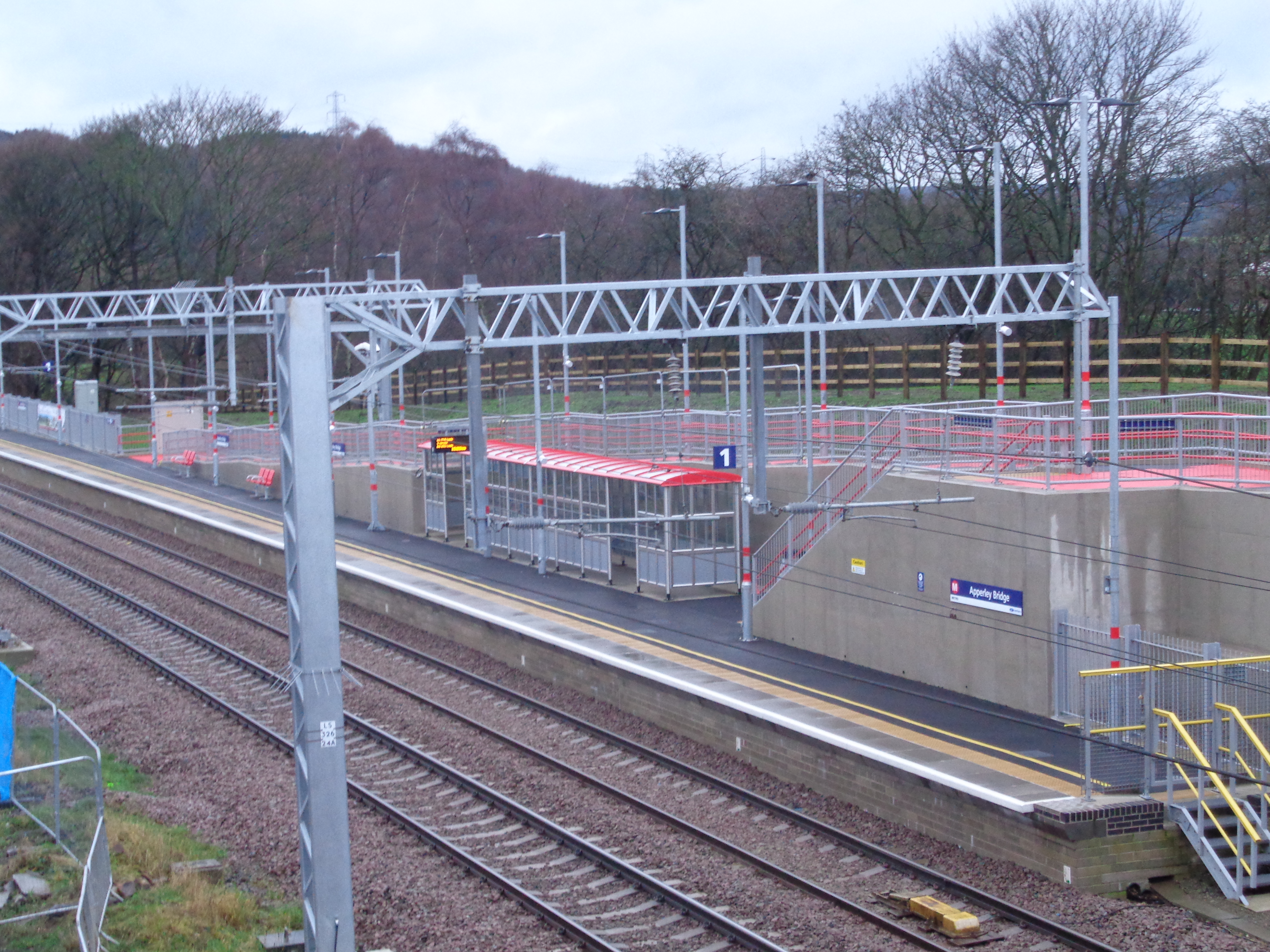
- Platform 1 (Leeds bound)

General information
- Location: Apperley Bridge, City of Bradford; England
- Coordinates: 53.8419°N 1.7065°W
- Grid reference: SE196383
- Manager: Northern
- Platforms: 2

Other information
- Station code: APY

History
- Original company: Leeds and Bradford Railway
- Pre-grouping: Midland Railway
- Post-grouping: London, Midland and Scottish Railway

Key dates
- Late July 1846: Opened as Apperley Bridge
- 1847: Renamed Apperley
- 1 October 1890: Renamed Apperley and Rawdon
- May 1893: Renamed Apperley Bridge and Rawdon
- 12 June 1961: Renamed Apperley Bridge
- 20 March 1965: Closed
- 13 December 2015: Rebuilt and Reopened

Passengers
- 2021/22: ▲0.263 million
- 2022/23: ▲0.363 million
- 2023/24: ▲0.389 million
- 2024/25: ▲0.456 million
- 2025/26: ▲0.483 million
Location
Notes
- Passenger statistics from the Office of Rail and Road

Apperley Bridge station is situated in Bradford on the (Leeds and Bradford, later Midland) line between Leeds and Shipley, West Yorkshire, England. It serves the district of Apperley Bridge in the north-east of the city.

The station opened in 2015. A previous station with the same name was opened in a different location in 1846 but closed in 1965 as part of the Beeching Axe.

== Original station ==
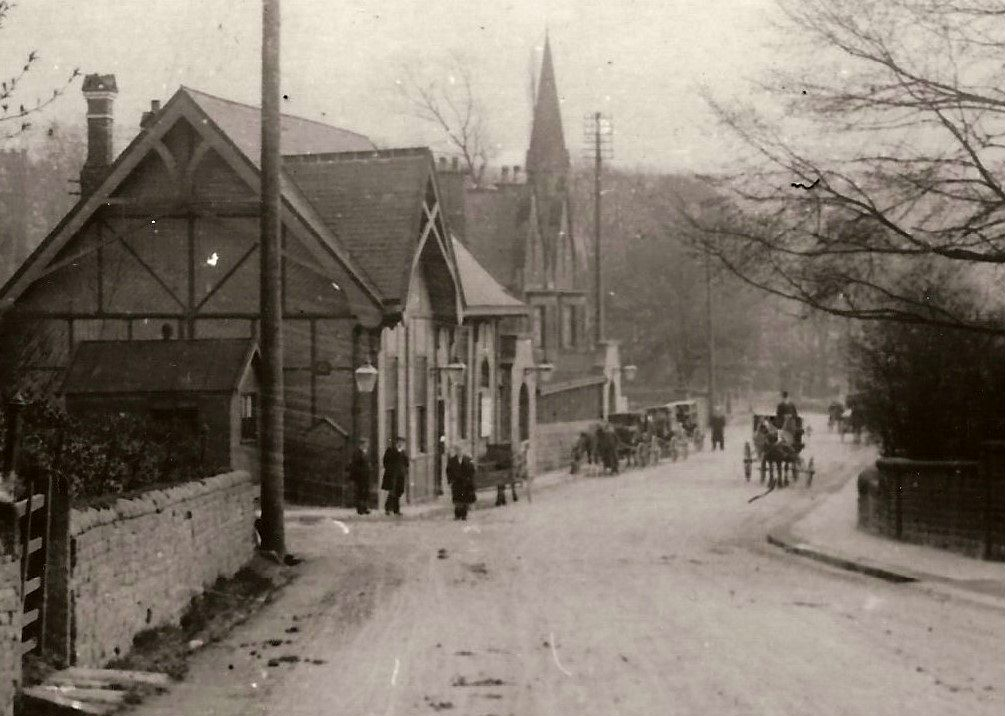
Old Apperley Bridge station building, before 1914

The Leeds and Bradford Railway opened on 30 June 1846. At first, there were no intermediate stations. Temporary stations were provided, including Apperley Bridge, which opened some time during July 1846. A permanent structure followed about a year later. It comprised two platforms, partly covered by an overall roof. The main building ran parallel to the railway on the south side up at road level. A principal customer was Woodhouse Grove School, whose land had been crossed by the Railway. About 1849, the railway agreed to purchase gas from the school to light the station.

The Leeds and Bradford Railway was leased to the Midland Railway from just before its opening, an event of some importance in terms of railway politics. It contributed to the downfall of George Hudson and helped ensure that Bradford never had a through railway. It had previously been thought that the Leeds and Bradford might join with the Manchester & Leeds Railway.

The railway was widened to four tracks in about 1900, taking more land from Woodhouse Grove School, who used the money to build a swimming baths. The station was enlarged to four platforms, with a distinctive wooden building above at road level. The original station building was demolished when the cutting was widened to accommodate the new "fast lines" on the south side. Platform four, on the up slow line, remained the original of 1847 as there was no room to develop it. The other platforms, number 1 on the down fast line and numbers 2 and 3, the island between the up fast and down slow, were longer, wider and higher. Steps were needed to board trains on platform 4. There were canopies above all four platforms.

The station became part of the London, Midland and Scottish Railway during the Grouping of 1923, and passed to the London Midland Region of British Railways on nationalisation in 1948. It was transferred to the North Eastern Region in 1957 and gained ten tangerine totem signs about 1961.

A goods yard operated at the angle between the main line and the Ilkley branch. It handled domestic coal until closure in June 1964. By that time the cattle dock was overgrown. A small housing estate now stands on the site. The passenger station gained an enhanced service, almost at regular intervals, when diesel multiple units were introduced in January 1959. Just one stopping train remained steam-hauled, the 6.24 pm to Leeds, which conveyed more parcel vans than passenger stock. It was named the "Derby Slow" and continued to Derby after a lengthy pause at Leeds.

The station was used by about 80 passengers a day, that is 80 joining and 80 alighting. With 40 stopping trains, that was an average of two per train, but a total usage (by current calculations of "footfall") of over 50,000 journeys a year.

The original station was closed by the British Railways Board, as a result of the Beeching Axe, at about 9.30 pm on 20 March 1965. The station handled parcels by passenger train right up to the final day. The delivery area was then transferred to Guiseley station.

== Reopening ==
In 1999, Metro, the Passenger Transport Executive for West Yorkshire, announced that Apperley Bridge was amongst five new or reopened stations which they wished to see achieved over the ensuing five years. One of these stations — Glasshoughton — opened in 2005.

In 2009 Metro submitted a business case and designs for both Apperley Bridge and Kirkstall Forge. They were to have staggered platforms and a car park for 300 vehicles. It was originally projected that the station would reopen in 2012, but this was pushed back to August 2015, with main construction commencing in 2014. A planning application was submitted in December 2009 and permission to build was granted by Bradford Council in March 2010.

Go-ahead for construction of both Kirkstall Forge and Apperley Bridge was given in the National Infrastructure Plan released on 29 November 2011. The original estimated completion date of August 2015 was not met, and the opening was later scheduled for the end of September 2015. The station was eventually reopened on 13 December 2015.

=== Funding ===
In September 2008, the West Yorkshire PTE announced that the Yorkshire & Humber Regional Transport Board had approved funding for its "rail growth programme" which includes stations at Apperley Bridge and Kirkstall Forge; this allowed a full business case for the two stations to be developed. Following the Comprehensive Spending Review in Autumn 2010 the Leeds Rail Growth Package was included within the "Development" pool of schemes. Metro submitted a "Best and Final Funding Bid" in September 2011 and the schemes funding was confirmed in November 2011 as part of the National Infrastructure Plan.

Final approval for both stations was given by the Department for Transport on 29 May 2014. By 2014 the documentation was corrected as the National Infrastructure Plan 2011 lists Apperley Bridge incorrectly as Appley Bridge. In July 2014, Metro announced that construction work would begin in September 2014, and the station would open in 2015.

== Facilities ==
The new station has a free car park, bicycle rungs and a bus terminus. There is an automated ticket machine at the station entrance. Both platforms, in line with the Disability Discrimination Act, are accessible by wheelchair via ramps. Both platforms have an unheated shelter and digital information screens. A new set of traffic lights manages traffic at the entrance to the station car park.

== Bus services ==
Transdev Flyer service A2 serves the station to provide connections to Bradford Interchange, Leeds-Bradford Airport and Harrogate.

== Services ==
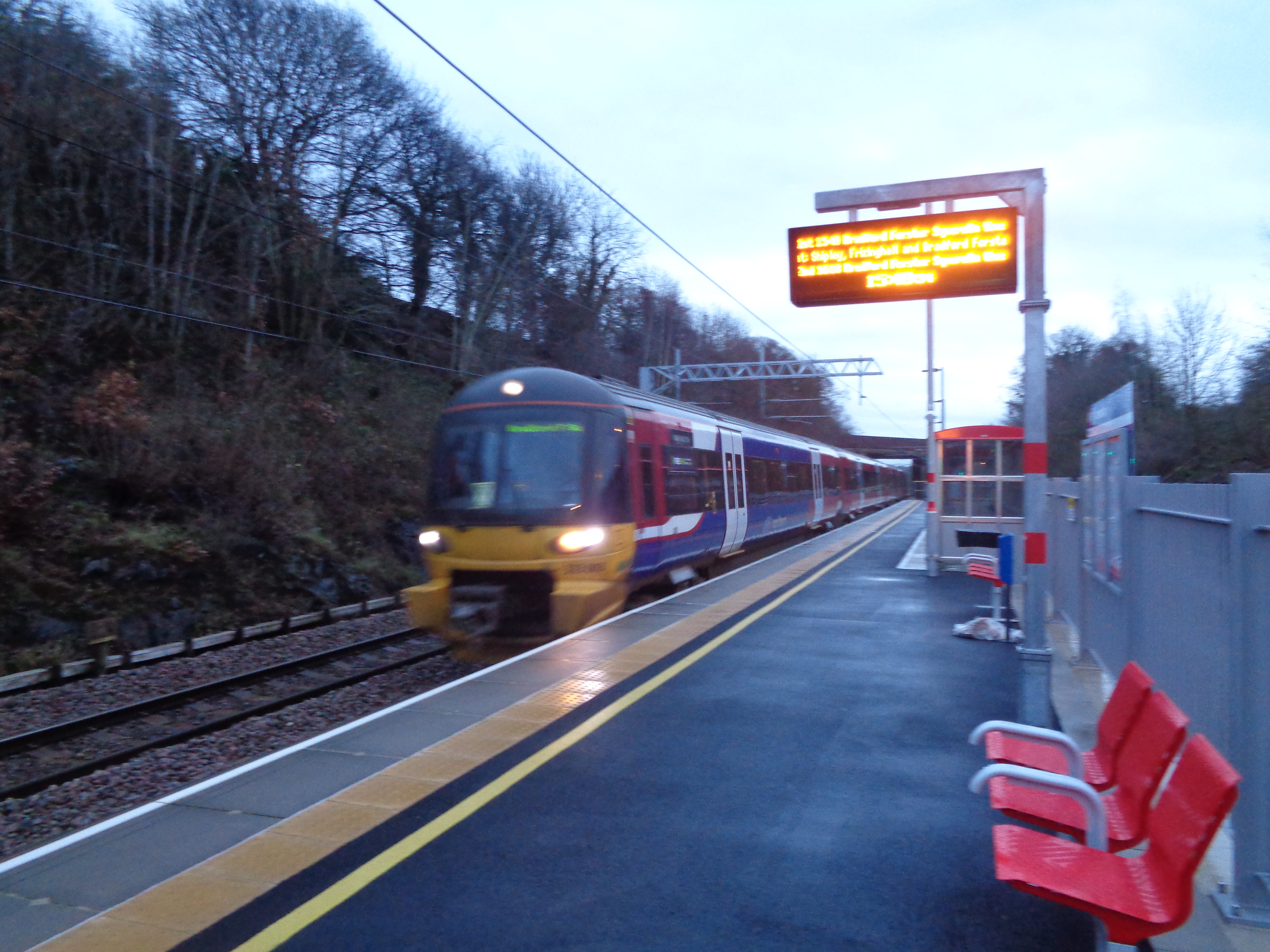
British Rail Class 333 on Bradford-bound platform, December 2015

Apperley Bridge is primarily served by trains from Leeds to Bradford Forster Square on the Leeds–Bradford line. These services operate every 30 minutes each way and are mostly operated by Northern Class 333 electric multiple units, although Class 331 sets are used on some weekday workings. Most trains to Skipton and further beyond pass through the station without stopping (though a small number do call in the morning peak). Since the May 2018 timetable change, Leeds-bound services all now call at Kirkstall Forge en route (previously these ran non-stop, with Kirkstall Forge served by Wharfedale Line trains instead).

Monday to Saturday evening trains (after 19:30) run to and from Skipton; passengers for Bradford Forster Square must change using a connecting shuttle service that runs between Shipley and Bradford Forster Square.

On Sundays, there is an hourly service to both Leeds and Bradford Forster Square.

Preceding station	National Rail	Following station
Shipley	Northern; Leeds–Bradford line	Kirkstall Forge
Shipley	Northern; Airedale Line; Mon–Sat evenings only	Kirkstall Forge
	Historical railways	
Idle	Midland Railway; Leeds and Bradford Railway	Calverley and Rodley
