= Armley Canal Road railway station =

Disused railway station in West Yorkshire, England

Armley Canal Road
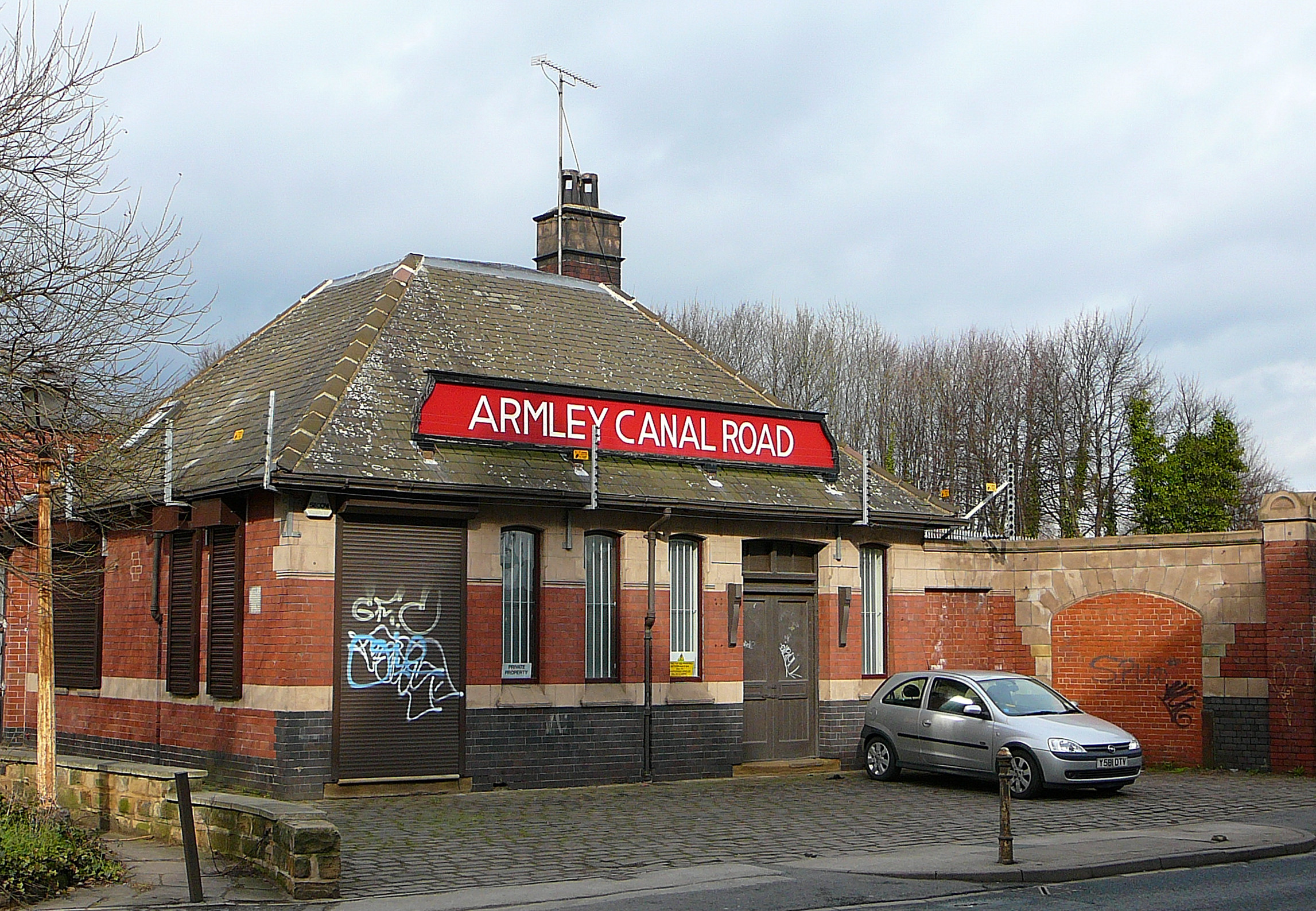
- Booking office of Armley Canal Road in 2008

General information
- Location: Armley, City of Leeds; England
- Coordinates: 53.8010°N 1.5829°W
- Grid reference: SE275339
- Platforms: 2

Other information
- Status: Disused

History
- Original company: Leeds and Bradford Railway
- Pre-grouping: Midland Railway
- Post-grouping: London Midland and Scottish Railway

Key dates
- September 1847: Station opens as Armley
- 25 September 1950: Station renamed Armley Canal Road
- 22 March 1965: Station closes
Location

Armley Canal Road railway station was a station on the former Midland Railway between Leeds and Shipley. It served the Leeds suburb of Armley in West Yorkshire, England until closure in 1965.

== History ==
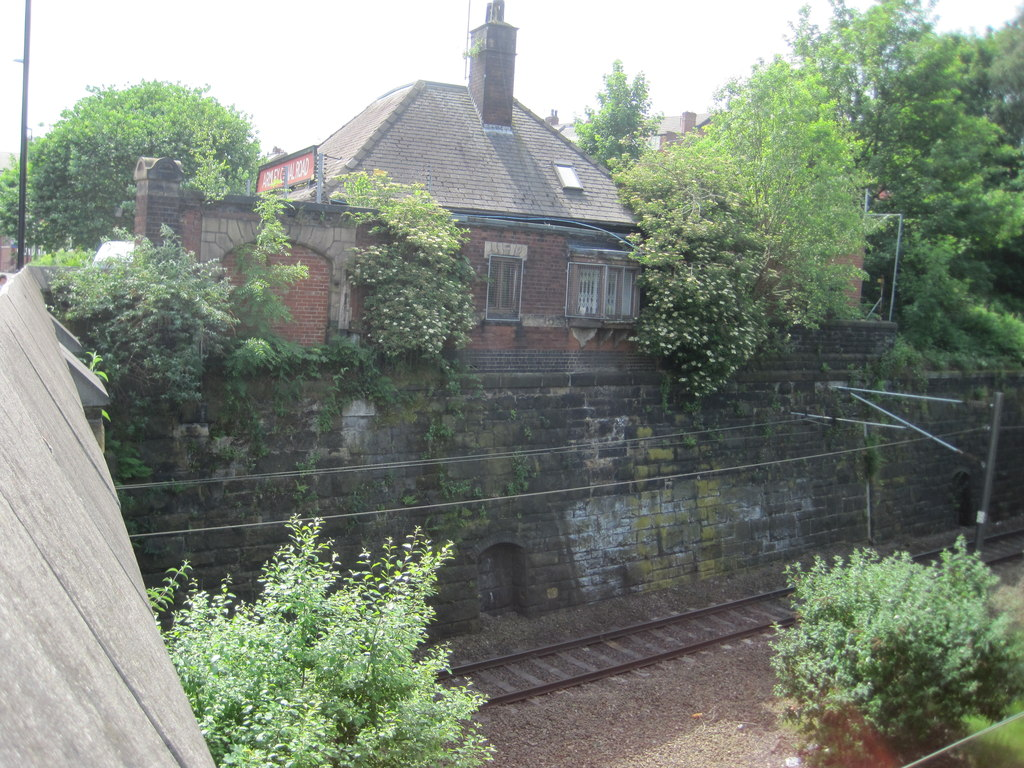
The two island platforms were connected to the street level booking office via a wooden footbridge

The station was opened by the Leeds and Bradford Railway in 1846 (which was subsequently absorbed by the Midland Railway) which became part of the London Midland and Scottish Railway following the Grouping Act of 1923. The station, which had a street-level booking hall, consisted of two island platforms which were separated by double track. Passenger services stopped between the platforms. The outside lines, which were fenced off from the island platforms, were used by through trains. A wooden footbridge connected the two island platforms to the street-level entrance way and booking hall.

In 1948 the station passed on to the Eastern Region of British Railways following nationalisation. It was permanently closed by the British Railways Board as part of the Beeching Axe in March 1965.

After closure, the station building was retained on Canal Road and was later used as commercial premises. The station sign has been repainted but not in its original colours or font. Nothing remains of the wooden footbridge and the island platforms. The remains of the entrance archway that led onto the bridge was bricked up. A gap remains between the surviving two lines showing where the former island platforms formerly stood.

Preceding station	Disused railways	Following station
Holbeck (Low level)	London Midland and Scottish Railway; Midland Railway	Kirkstall
