= Bradford Crossrail =

Cross-city rail proposal in Bradford, Yorkshire, England

Diagram of city centre stations in Bradford, West Yorkshire

Bradford Crossrail is an idea to link together Bradford's two railway stations, Bradford Forster Square and Bradford Interchange. Both these stations are truncated versions of former station sites, Bradford Forster Square station and Bradford Exchange. These stations were built in the 19th century by different railway companies with an individual, rather than a comprehensive plan for rail development in the city.

== History ==
Linking the stations was first suggested as early as 1845; however, the Midland Railway (West Riding Lines) Act 1898 (61 & 62 Vict. c. clxiii), granted to the Midland Railway on the 25 July 1898, permitted them to build a new branch railway from Royston in South Yorkshire to Queens Road north of Bradford. The act allowed for a tunnel underneath the east side of Bradford, bypassing Exchange station, with underground platforms at Forster Square and emerging out to serve Manningham and beyond. The tunnel was to be 5,000 yards (4,600 m) long.

Another proposal was put forward in 1911 and an enabling act, the Midland Railway Act 1911 (1 & 2 Geo. 5. c. c), also known as the "Bradford Through Lines Act", was passed. The area between the stations was heavily built-up with Victorian warehouses, shops and offices, so the 1911 plan would have involved a large amount of demolition. This plan called for a line starting near Low Moor with a 3,600 yards (3,300 m) tunnel with a girder bridge high above Forster Square. The start of World War I put a stop to these plans. The Midland Railway eventually abandoned the plan and on the 30 September 1920, it sold all the buildings it had purchased for the scheme back to the Bradford Corporation for £295,000.

Another plan was to emerge in the 1950s when Bradford Corporation members discussed a circular rail service through Bradford using a new tunnel. This would see a train leaving Forster Square and calling at Manningham, Frizinghall, Shipley, Thackley, Idle, Eccleshill, Laisterdyke, St Dunstan's, Bradford Exchange and back into Forster Square (and vice versa). This would use the closed Shipley and Windhill Line. The tunnel was eventually rejected as the height difference between Exchange and Forster Square of 70 feet (21 m) made the gradient unacceptable.

By the late 1950s and early 1960s many of the Victorian buildings in central Bradford were demolished to make way for the urban vision of the then Bradford city engineer Stanley Wardley. Although the land between the two stations was cleared to make way for new office blocks and an urban ring road, the plans did not include a cross rail link. A slightly different vision did emerge in the 1970s when the Victorian Bradford Exchange station was demolished and a new integrated Bradford Interchange rail and bus station was built to the south of Bridge Street.

The idea of a crossrail route for Bradford was raised in 1989, when the estimated cost was £30 million. By 2010, when another proposal was mooted, the cost was estimated at £140 million.

Many of Wardley’s highrise office blocks and shops did not ultimately prove successful and by the late 1980s many of them lay empty. An initial plan was put forward to redevelop part of the city centre with a shopping development called the Broadway Centre. Forster Square station was truncated in 1990 and a new station was built some distance to the north of the original to facilitate these plans. The aim was to build part of the new shopping centre in place of some of the demolished 1960s buildings with the rest of the centre taking up the site of the old station. By truncating the station it was hoped that passengers walking to the new platforms would shop in the shopping centre, thus making it more viable. The recession of the early 1990s however, put paid to these plans and this version of the Broadway Centre was never built.

== 21st century ==
By 2004 another plan had emerged to build a new Westfield shopping centre in the middle of Bradford. This led to the wholesale urban clearance of many of the 1960s buildings to make way for the new centre. Although work started on laying the groundwork for the new shopping centre another recession again put paid to the initial plans with Westfield still planning to build a new smaller centre when financial conditions were more favourable. In January 2014, the site was cleared and steelwork was erected in March 2014 with the main building works following on. The centre was opened to the public in November 2015.

As most of the land between the stations is now clear of buildings this has led to further speculation about the viability of building a cross city heavy rail link. Bradford Council had discussed plans long before in the 1980s, but linking the stations was ultimately deemed to be too expensive. Today, even with the clearance of most of the land there is no official plan by either the Bradford Council or the Westfield Group to develop a link. Although Westfield did design and fund the new Shepherd's Bush station as part of their West London shopping development. The development of Stratford station in East London is also connected to Westfield's Stratford City project.

In 2010, a group of local businessmen and councillors have put forward a plan to link Bradford's stations. Inspired by other rail projects, such as the London Overground link in Shoreditch, the Bradford business plan involved building new Bradford central station linked by a viaduct and track bridging the distance (currently 0.44 miles (0.71 km)) and the gradient difference involved. The Bradford Crossrail plan is aimed to stimulate business investment in Bradford, but due to the high costs and major engineering works involved it is not likely to be taken forward at this time as a heavy rail link; however, The One North Report from 2014 suggested a tram-train route from the Interchange via Forster Square and continuing on to Leeds Bradford Airport.

The Campaign for Better Transport support the proposal to join the two stations at Bradford with a crossrail link. The support comes from their Re-Opening Rail Lines campaign, which is focused around previous railways being re-opened.

In January 2019, Campaign for Better Transport released a report identifying the line which was listed as Priority 2 for being built. Priority 2 is for those lines which require further development or a change in circumstances (such as housing developments).

The Northern Powerhouse Rail project has also mooted a project to link Leeds and Manchester with a through route at Bradford. Whilst this would either involve a bypass line south of the city and a parkway station at Low Moor or a new route tunnelling through the city centre, neither option mentions connecting the lines from both north and south of the city.
