= Bradford Forster Square =

Bradford Forster Square may refer to the following in Bradford, West Yorkshire, England:

- Bradford Forster Square railway station
- Forster Square, part of central Bradford
