= Royston to Thornhill line =

Disused railway in West Yorkshire, England

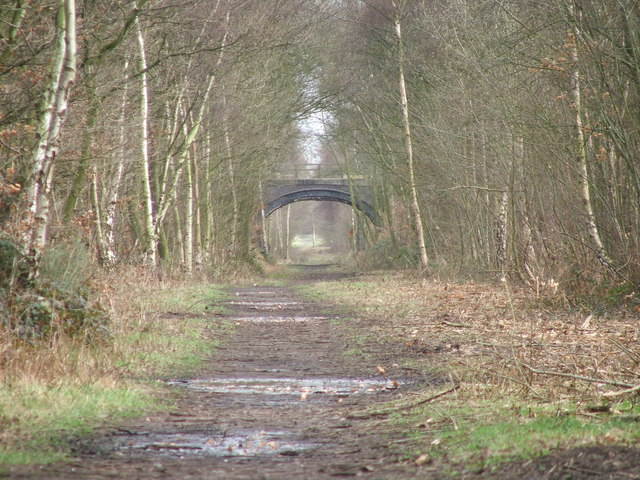
- Dismantled railway near Notton.

Overview
- Other name: West Riding Lines
- Status: Closed
- Owner: MR (1905 – 1948); BR (1948 – 1968)
- Locale: West Yorkshire, England
- Stations: 4 (all goods-only)

Service
- Type: Heavy rail

History
- Opened: see below:
- Royston to Thornhill Midland: 1905
- Middlestown Junction to Dewsbury Savile Town: 1906
- Mirfield to Huddersfield Newtown: 1910
- Closed: 1968 (completely)

Technical
- Line length: 15 miles (24 km) total: Royston – Thornhill 8 miles (13 km); Middlestown Junction – Savile Town 2.5 miles (4 km); Mirfield – Newtown 4.5 miles (7.2 km)
- Track gauge: 1,435 mm (4 ft 8 1/2 in) standard gauge

The Royston to Thornhill line was a Midland Railway venture constructed in West Yorkshire, England, that had the intent to allow trains to travel from Sheffield to Bradford without going through Leeds. The scheme, which was promoted as the West Riding Lines, would have travelled underneath Bradford city centre in a long tunnel and ended up in the Aire Valley providing a through line across Bradford. In the event, only the section from Royston to Thornhill, a smaller branch to a goods station at Dewsbury Savile Town, and a longer branch from Mirfield to Huddersfield were ever built. By the late 1960s, the lines had all been closed, however, the viaducts at Bradley, Crigglestone, and Horbury still remain.

== History ==
The line was promoted by the Midland Railway with a view to shortening the distance needed to travel from London St Pancras to Bradford, (Note: The Midland Railway estimated that the distance between London St Pancras and Bradford would be shorter by 11 miles (18 km).) and also to allow the Midland to make inroads into the Huddersfield, Halifax and Dewsbury areas. The proposal received assent from Parliament in 1898, with an estimated cost of £2.1 million. The length of the entire line between Royston and Bradford was listed as 24 miles (39 km), and the extension would put Bradford on the main line to London. However, only 15 miles (24 km) of the proposed length was ever built; 8 miles (13 km) connecting Royston with Thornhill Junction, 2.5 miles (4 km) connecting to Dewsbury Savile Town, and a 4.5-mile (7.2 km) branch from Mirfield to Huddersfield Newtown.

Construction started in 1902 starting from Royston Junction, and was open from there to Thornhill Junction by November 1905, and into Dewsbury Savile Town by March 1906. Major engineering efforts on the line include viaducts at Horbury Bridge and Calder Grove (Crigglestone), and a 250-yard (230 m) tunnel at Crigglestone. After the Dewsbury branch had crossed the L&YR main line, the line dropped down a 1-in-40 gradient and passed through a 188 yards (172 m) tunnel before arriving at the terminus. The only major structure on the single-track Mirfield to Huddersfield Newtown Branch, was a 15-arch viaduct across the River Colne at Bradley. Had the scheme been carried out to the full plans, a new line would have been constructed along the Spen Valley, and a tunnel would have been required under Bradford for a length of 5,000 yards (4,600 m), which would have started south of Bradford and emerged at the Midland Line from Forster Square (Note: At that time, the terminus of the Midland Railway at the Northern end of the city centre was known as Market Street. The station was renamed as Forster Square in 1924.) just 150 yards (140 m) north of the platform ends at Forster Square. After the initial sections of the line were built, the Midland Railway halted any further construction stating that the engineering difficulties of building the line in Bradford were proving too costly. The plans for a line through Spen Valley were shelved when an agreement with the L&YR was reached regarding running powers over the line between Thornhill and Low Moor, thus allowing the Midland into Bradford without the need to build a new line.

One of the conditions attached to the 1898 bill was that the Midland Railway were legally responsible protect the water rights for a water-powered mill in the Ripley area of Bradford. When tunnelling through hills, the normal approach is to drain all water away to the nearest watercourse, but this would have deprived Ripley's mill of its water, preventing it from operating. Consideration was given to a viaduct across Bradford instead of a tunnel, but by 1907, a West Riding Lines Abandonment Bill was being tabled in Parliament for changes to the original bill. By 1910, three express trains per day were leaving Bradford for St Pancras, but using the L&YR lines to Thornhill Midland Junction, and the lack of a through station at Dewsbury (Savile Town was a terminus), led to the Dewsbury Town Council opposing an amended scheme that used running powers of the other lines than a continuation of the line through Dewsbury. The whole project was shelved at the start of the First World War, and never resurrected, with the scheme being formally abandoned in November 1919.

Although the line was furnished with three stations, no passenger traffic called at these, and only the Lancashire & Yorkshire Railway ran local passenger trains over the formation of the line as through trains, with the L&YR possessing running powers over the Midland line as far south as Sheffield. Longer-distance services, such as The Yorkshireman, saw a direct Bradford to London St Pancras (avoiding Leeds) using the line, but this only ran between 1925 and 1939, the service being cut back during the World War II. Most passenger services continued until 1948, but the last services ran over the line in 1968. Middlestown and Crigglestone East stations had goods yards, and they were built with two platforms each, both of these aligned along the main running lines. Dewsbury Savile Town closed in 1950, however, the line was open from Middlestown Junction to Dewsbury well into the early 1960s as a wagon storage facility.

The line was transferred from the London Midland Region of British Rail, to the North Eastern Region in 1957. The bulk of the line was closed in 1968, though the section between Thornhill and Crigglestone Viaduct was kept open to provide materials for the building of the M1 at the eastern end.

The eastern section of line through Notton is now bridleway and cyclepath, connecting with the Trans Pennine Trail in Royston.

A further Midland branch extended from Mirfield to Huddersfield Newtown. The Midland built this line from Mirfield to Huddersfield as the LNWR would not allow the Midland running powers over their Line between Heaton Lodge Junction and Huddersfield. However, the original plan was to extend the line from Middlestown Junction all the way to Huddersfield, but the L&YR consented to allow the Midland Railway to use the section between Thornhill Midland Junction and Mirfield, before the Midland's own branch left southwards at Mirfield station. This benefitted the Midland in reduced costs of a longer line. The line ran for 4.5 miles (7.2 km) and was built as a double track formation, though only one running line was ever laid. Newtown Goods Yard, and the line opened on 1 November 1910. As the LNWR was amalgamated into the Midland at the Grouping of 1923, (Note: As a preparation for the grouping to take place, the L&YR had already been amalgamated into the LNWR in 1922.) the longer line was deemed unnecessary, and so a connection was made with the main Huddersfield to Heaton Lodge line in 1923 at Red Doles Junction. Thereafter, goods trains from Newtown Yard propelled backwards up the line, so that they were facing the correct way to then run southwards to Hillhouse Yard, and the line to Mirfield from Red Doles Junction closed completely in 1937. This produced a shorter branch of 1 mile 286 yards (1.871 km) between Red Doles and Newtown. Newtown Goods Yard closed in August 1968.

=== Stations ===
- Dewsbury Savile Town - The Midland intended this to be a passenger station (Dewsbury's fourth passenger station) and that the line would extend northwards towards Low Moor and Bradford. It opened in 1906 and closed in December 1950 - it was the last of the four goods stations serving Dewsbury, and the first to be closed.
- Middlestown [and] Crigglestone East - both Middlestown and Crigglestone were goods-only stations; no passengers used the stations, even though their intent had been to provide for passengers, even so far as passengers trains being run along the line. Middlestown was also listed as being the station "for Horbury".
- Huddersfield Newtown was opened in 1910 and closed completely in August 1968. In 1956, it was listed as being able to handle coal and minerals, with the yard being equipped with a 10 tonnes (11 tons) crane. The line to the gasworks was completed in 1923, and then closed in 1966.

== The viaducts ==
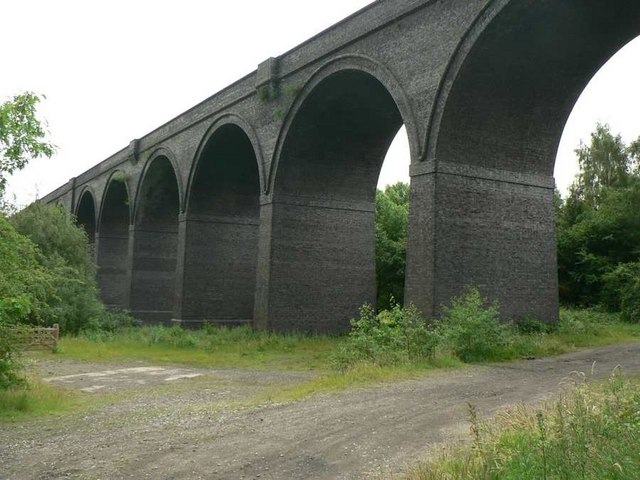
Crigglestone Viaduct

Horbury Viaduct is 333 yards (304 m) long, 26-foot (7.9 m) wide, and has 17 arches. The viaduct is lower than at Crigglestone as it only reaches a maximum height of 50 feet (15 m), and each span is 45 feet (14 m) across. Crigglestone Viaduct spans the Hallam Line and the A645 road, and used to also run over old colliery workings, and the west to south Horbury curve railway line which closed in 1991. Crigglestone has 21 arches, spanning 1,270 feet (390 m) and is over 82 feet (25 m) high. From west to east, the first 16 arches are 50 feet (15 m) across, the next two are 64 feet (20 m), and the final three are 57 feet (17 m) across.

Crigglestone straddled the coal workings for British Oak and Flockton collieries, the Horbury Curve (also known as the Crigglestone Curve) - a railway line connecting Horbury to the line going south from Wakefield to Barnsley, the A645, and finally, the Wakefield to Barnsley Line itself. Both Horbury and Crigglestone viaducts are built of blue brick, and designed by J. A. McDonald. In 2023, Crigglestone was renovated with repointed brickwork, vegetation cut back, and new bat boxes and bat tubes installed after it was found that pipistrelle bats were living within its structure.

Bradley Viaduct is 255 yards (233 m) long, 90 feet (27 m) high, and has 15 arches. Bradley Viaduct now forms part of the Calder Valley Greenway, and the section of the greenway between the viaduct and Mirfield, is on the former railway trackbed.

== See also ==
- Bradford Crossrail
