= Bradford Playhouse =

Theatre and former cinema in Bradford, England

- Bradford Civic Playhouse; Priestley Theatre
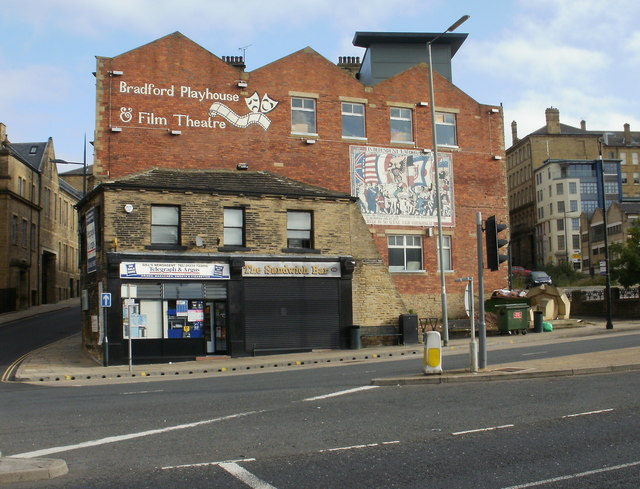
- Interactive map of Bradford Playhouse
- Address: Chapel Street, Little Germany; Bradford; England
- Coordinates: 53.79379°N 1.74554°W

Construction
- Opened: 1929
- Reopened: January 1937
- Rebuilt: 1936

Website
- http://www.bradfordplayhouse.org.uk

The Bradford Playhouse is a 266-seat proscenium arch theatre with circle and stall seating based in Little Germany, in the city of Bradford, West Yorkshire, England. Formerly known as The Priestley, the theatre also has a studio space that has flexible lighting, sound and seating arrangements.

== Foundation ==
The theatre was founded by an amateur group, the Bradford Playhouse Company, in 1929, renting Jowett Hall – an ex-Temperance Hall previously used as a cinema – as its premises. The Bradford company was an offshoot of the Leeds Civic Playhouse Company, and became independent of its parent in 1932.

== Association with J. B. Priestley ==
J. B. Priestley became president of the theatre in 1932, when it separated from Leeds Civic Theatre, and remained president until his death in 1984. His sister Winnie, who had been the secretary of the Bradford branch of the Leeds Civic Theatre, went on to serve as secretary to the independent Bradford Civic Theatre, and is commemorated by a plaque in the theatre.

In 1934, Priestley wrote of the Bradford Civic Theatre in his book English Journey.

Bradford has a Civic Theatre, of which I happen to be President... Even now, many people do not realise that there is a chain of such theatres, small intelligent repertory theatres organised on various lines, stretching across the country. Most of them have to struggle along, … this dramatic movement, … is of immense social importance – To begin with, it is a genuine popular movement, not something fostered by a few rich cranks. The people who work for these theatres are not by any means people who want to kill time. They are generally hard-working men and women … whose evenings are precious to them … and they are tremendously enthusiastic, even if at times they are also like all theatrical folk everywhere – given to quarrelling and displays of temperament ...These theatres are very small and have to fight for their very existence, but … I see them as little camp-fires twinkling in a great darkness. Readers … may possibly not care twopence if every playhouse in the country should close tomorrow. The point is that in communities that have suffered the most from industrial depression, among younger people who frequently cannot see what is to become of their jobs and their lives, these theatres have opened little windows into a world of ideas, colour, fine movement, exquisite drama, have kept going a stir of thought and imagination for actors, helpers, audiences, have acted as outposts for the army of the citizens of tomorrow, demanding to live.

== Fires and rebuildings ==
Jowett Hall burned down in April 1935. With help from Priestley, who donated royalties from several plays, the organisation bought the site and rebuilt. Opened by Sir Barry Jackson in January 1937, the new premises were a combined theatre and cinema called the Priestley.

The company ran as an amateur theatre, with film showings between plays. The latter continued until 2001, despite losing its status as a regional film theatre a few years before, when the National Museum of Television, Film and Photography – now the National Media Museum took over that role.

On the night of Friday, 19 July 1996 during a run of Aristophanes' Lysistrata, the theatre had another major fire, but the company rebuilt the set in their Studio theatre so that the final show of the run took place.

During the 1996–97 season, although the main auditorium was closed for reconstruction, a full season of plays was presented in the Studio, then on Friday 31 October 1997 the main auditorium re-opened with J. B. Priestley's An Inspector Calls.

== Since 1997 ==
Since reopening in 1997 after the fire, as the Priestley Centre for the Arts, the theatre has suffered a sequence of financial crises, and closed or nearly closed several times.

In October 2001, it launched an appeal with the help of the Bradford Telegraph & Argus to raise £10,000 in order to avoid voluntary liquidation. The appeal raised over £11,000, and gave the theatre a breathing space of three months, but by January it was again reported as facing liquidation.

The theatre nevertheless continued to operate throughout 2002, but in January 2003 it was announced that it was to close on 20 January. But a new board, led by Thomas Sandford, managed to secure a £40,000 bank loan, and this, together with £18,000 in donations, allowed it to stay open. It was relaunched under the new name of The Priestley, with the management of the building now separate from the various groups that used the building.

The Priestley faced another financial crisis in Autumn 2008, and went into administration. It was relaunched with a new board led by Jenny Wilson, reverting to its former name, The Bradford Playhouse. A grant of £51,000 from the Arts Council of England in July 2009 brought it out of administration.

In September 2011, the Playhouse went into liquidation, with debts of £300,000. A former chairman of the Playhouse, Rob Walters, himself a creditor, agreed with the liquidators Clough & Co. that his company Be Wonderful Ltd. would run the theatre under licence from the liquidators. The theatre was reopened as The Little Germany Theatre. Be Wonderful announced that the Studio would be reopened in January 2012, as the "Isherwood Studio", in honour of former member Millicent Isherwood. A year later, in October 2012, Be Wonderful had had to close the theatre, but Clare and Jono Gadsby formed a new company Takeover Events & Theatre Ltd. to lease the building for six months: it was now called The New Bradford Playhouse.

Throughout, the liquidators had been looking for a purchaser for the building, with no guarantee that it would continue to be a theatre, and in June 2014 they announced that it was to go to auction on 10 July. Megan Murray, of the Friends of Bradford Playhouse, launched an appeal for funds to buy the building, and lobbied Bradford Council to declare it an Asset of Community Value, which would have delayed the liquidators' ability to sell it.

In July 2014, local theatre enthusiast Colin Fine bought the theatre from the liquidators, with the intention that it continue to be developed as a theatre. Takeover Events & Theatre continued to manage and run the theatre until July 2016, when they stepped back to concentrate on production. Megan and Carl Murray, who had been very much involved in managing the theatre, took over its running as Purple Stage Theatres on 1 August 2016.
