= Little Germany, Bradford =

Area of Bradford, West Yorkshire, England

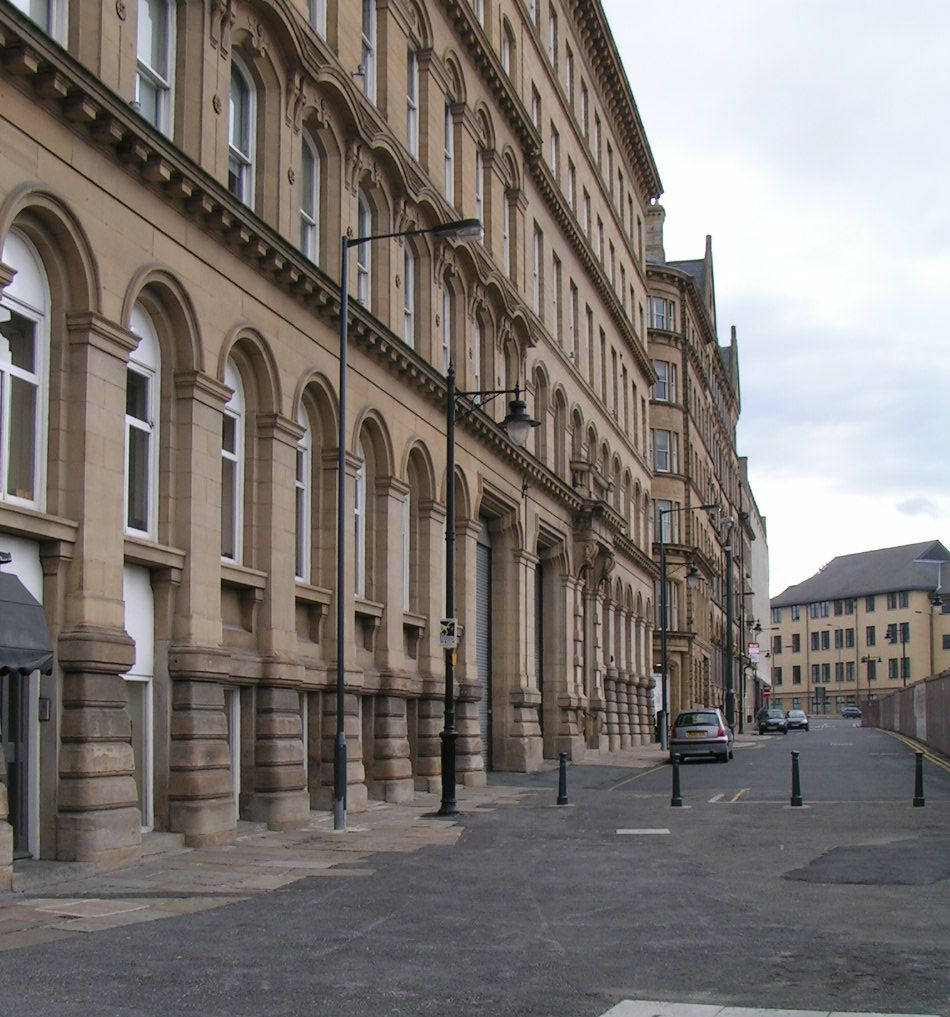
Victorian buildings in Little Germany

Little Germany is an area of particular historical and architectural interest in central Bradford, West Yorkshire, England. The architecture is predominantly neoclassical in style with an Italian influence. Many individual buildings are listed, and Little Germany is also protected as a Conservation Area.

== History and information ==
The buildings within Little Germany date back to the 19th century, developing from 1855. Most of the buildings were constructed for the use of textile businesses, although are also a few non-commercial buildings, for example Baptist and Methodist chapels. The commercial buildings are the legacy of merchants from mainland Europe, many of them Jewish, who spent large sums of money constructing imposing warehouses for the storage and sale of their goods for export. A large proportion of the merchants came from Germany hence the name Little Germany. Bradford, which already enjoyed free trade with France as a result of the Cobden–Chevalier Treaty (1860), became more attractive as a centre of international trade in the aftermath of the Franco-Prussian War (1870), which disrupted commercial relations between France and Germany.

Architectural practices included Milnes & France, Lockwood & Mawson, Andrews & Delaunay and J.T. Fairbank building in italianate style. An 1871 building by George Corson for Scottish clients is in Scottish baronial style. Caspian House (61 East Parade) was built in 1873, as the warehouse of D. Delius and Company; the senior partner in the business was the father of the composer Frederick Delius.

Little Germany is also the home of the Bradford Playhouse, which has a mural on the back of the building that commemorates the centenary of the founding of the Independent Labour Party in Bradford in 1893.

== Renovation ==
Little Germany is still one of Bradford's busiest commercial areas, with over 110 businesses and organisations with 3,000 workers. It attracts around 100,000 visitors each year. The local authority is currently promoting plans to regenerate the area by renovating and converting the interior of the old buildings into housing, hotels, offices, whilst preserving the originally Victorian distinctive architecture.

=== Redevelopment projects ===
==== Eastbrook Hall redevelopment ====
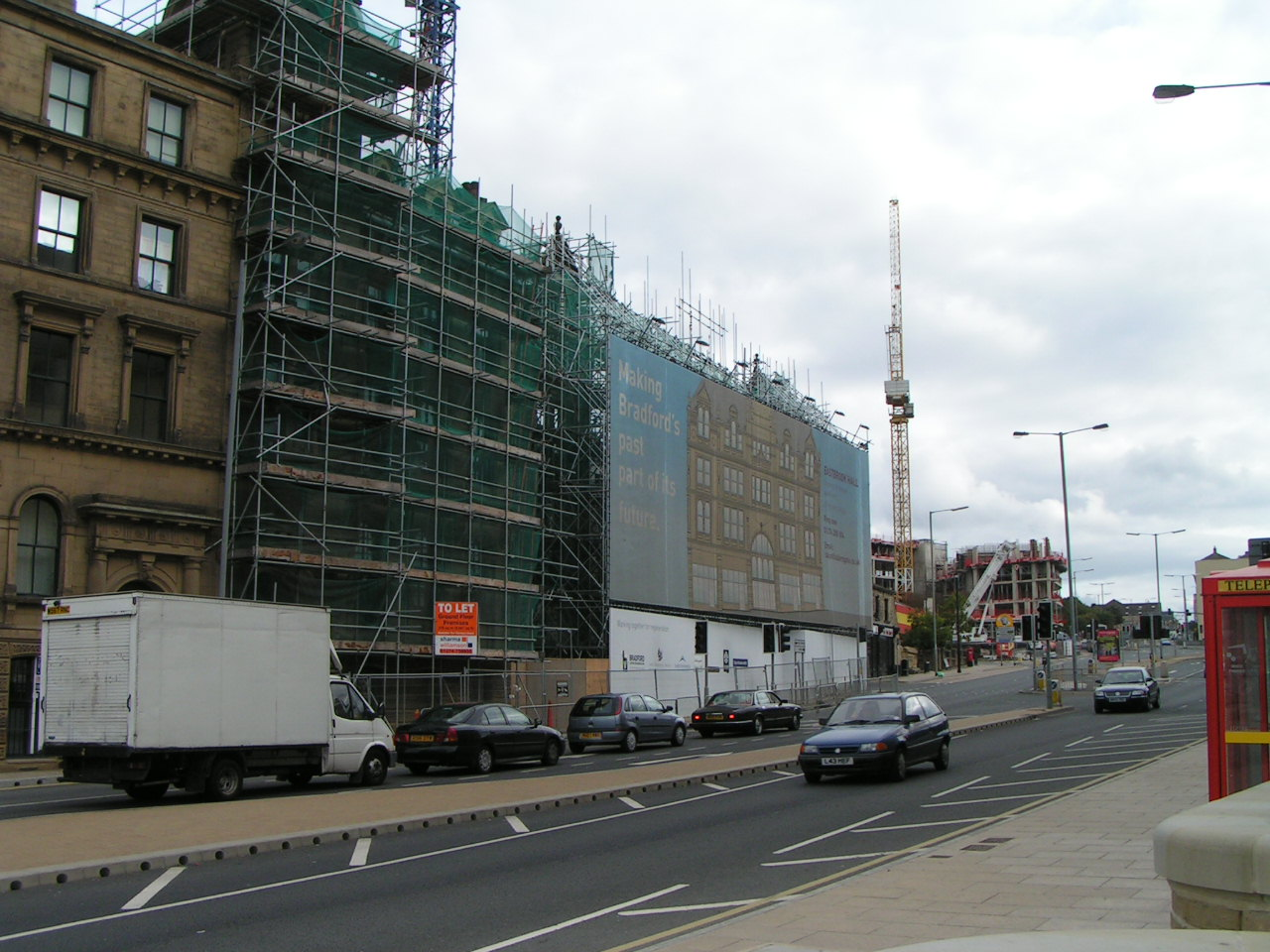
Eastbrook Hall

Ham Construction undertook the redevelopment of Eastbrook Hall in Little Germany. The project cost an estimated £11 million and converted the building into 63 high-quality apartments as well some commercial usage on Leeds Road. The project included a refurbishment of the exterior and roof of the listed building which had suffered extensive fire damage. The hall was built in 1903 and was originally used as a Methodist mission. The redevelopment was being funded through a public private sector funding agreement, as well as the Prince's Regeneration Trust. Work was finally completed in 2008, some months after the original projected finish date was set.

==== The Gatehaus ====
The Gatehaus is an 11-storey glass building constructed within the Little Germany district. Construction began in 2005 and was completed in 2007 with a total cost of £22 million. The project was originally proposed as a 17-storey landmark but was changed due to a rethink after suggestions that its height was incompatible with the surrounding Victorian buildings. The scheme was developed by Asquith Properties.

==== Freemans ====
In April 2012 retail giant Freeman Grattan Holdings, now a German-owned company, secured a deal to open a new head office and house around 300 staff in a Grade-II-listed former wool warehouse in Little Germany.

== Media usage ==
Scenes for the second season of the Channel 5 TV series All Creatures Great and Small were filmed in the area in April 2021.

The area was also used to portray Moscow during Queen Elizabeth's visit of Russia in the season 5 of Netflix series The Crown. Films which have used the area include Narnia: The Magician's Nephew and Six Treble Eight.

== See also ==
- Forster Square, Bradford
