= The Gatehaus =

Residential building in Bradford, England

Coordinates: 53.7935°N 1.7443°W

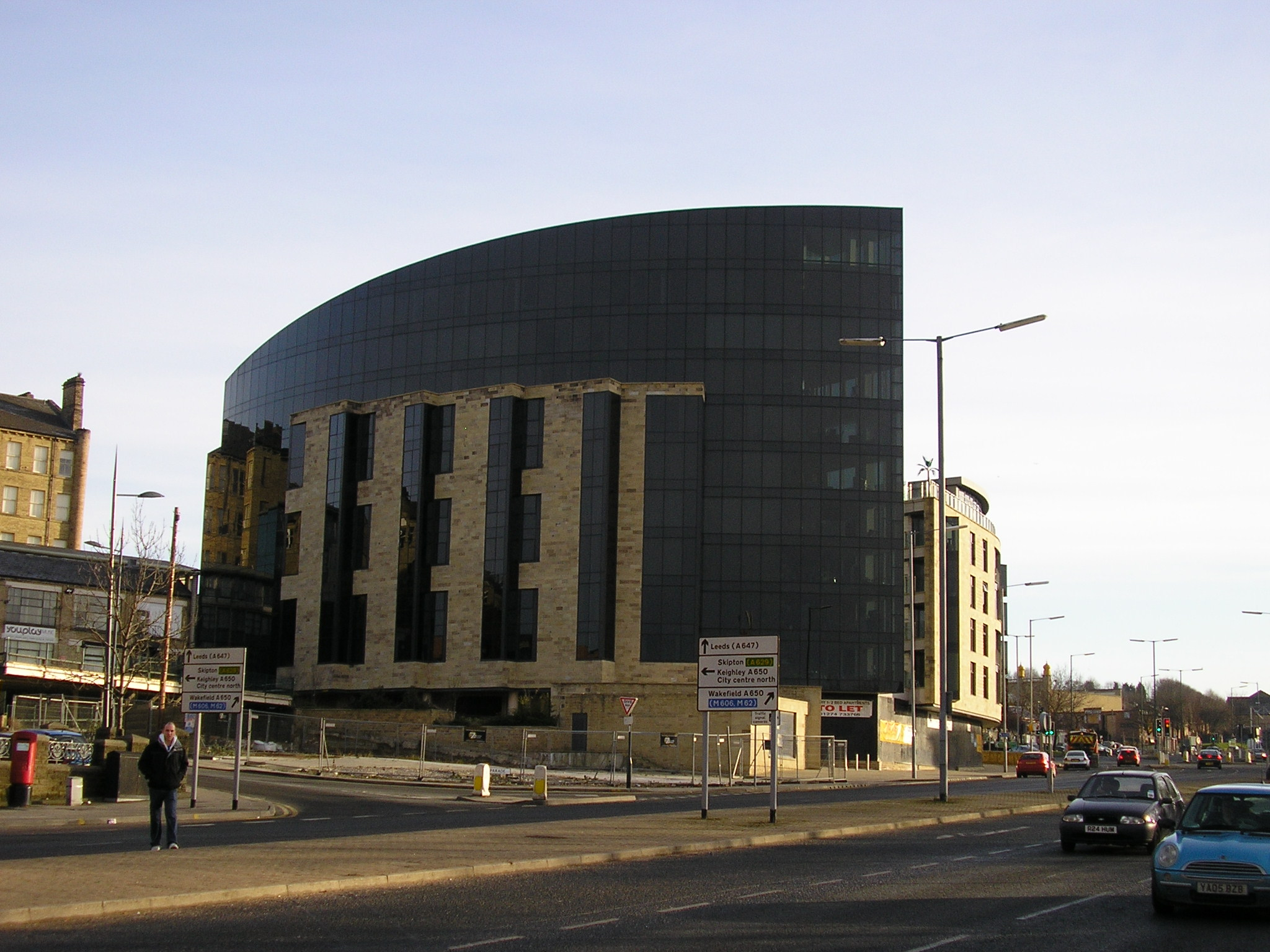

The Gatehaus is an eleven floor residential glass building located in Bradford, West Yorkshire in England. Developed by Asquith Properties, construction began in 2005 and was completed in May 2007. The total cost of the project was £22 million. The building won a number of awards in 2008, including "Building of the Year" at the Bradford District Design Awards, "Best City Centre Development" at the Resi Props Awards, and the "Design Excellence Award" at the Insider Property Awards.

The Gatehaus was originally proposed as a 17-storey building, however, due to proximity to the historic Little Germany area of Bradford, the original scheme was considered too overbearing and was reduced in height to match the Victorian structures. It now stands at 35m. There are 142 apartments with a range of one to three bedrooms.

== See also ==
- Little Germany, Bradford
