= Manningham railway station =

Disused railway station in West Yorkshire, England

Manningham
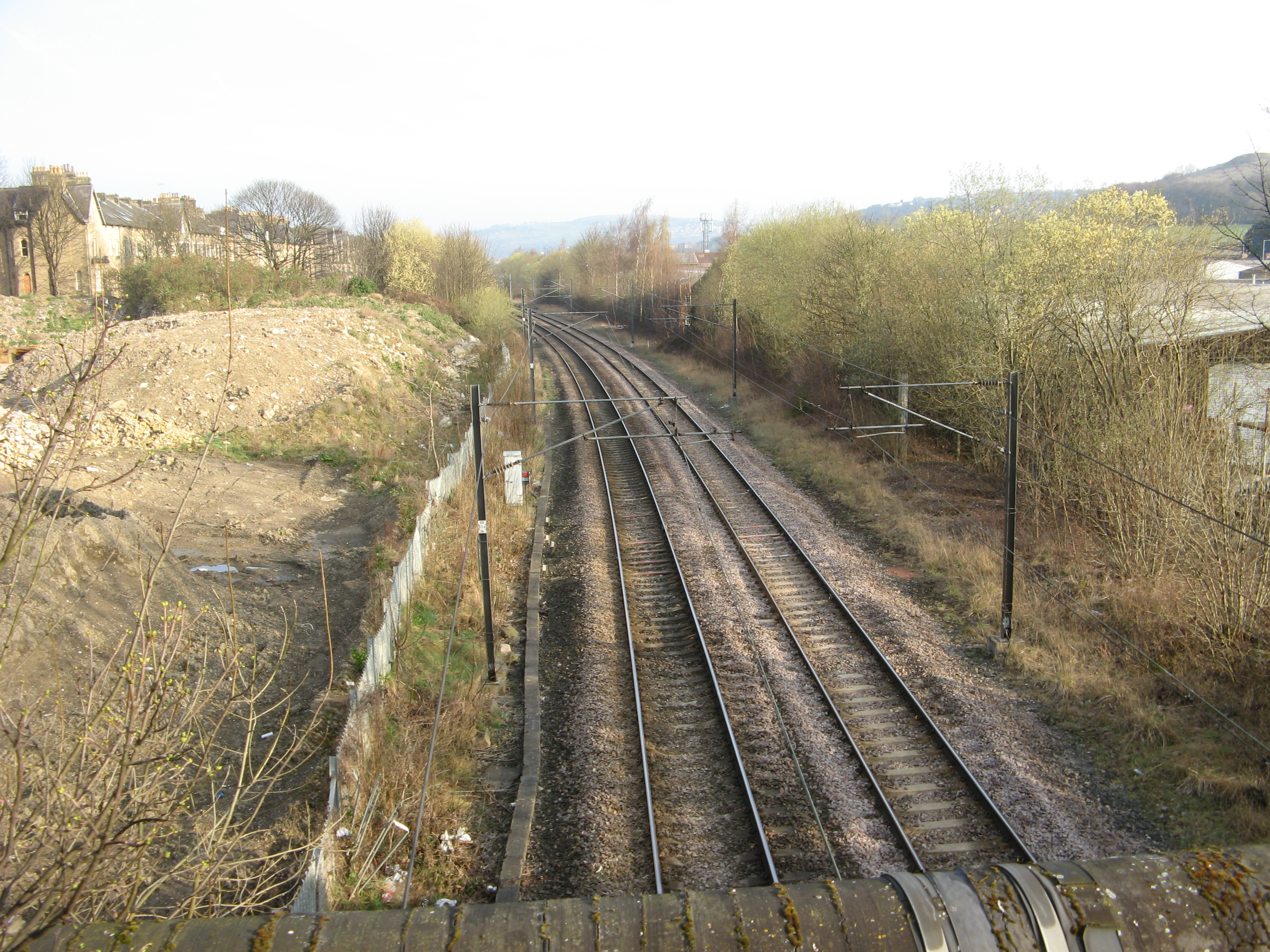
- Site of the former station (2010)

General information
- Location: Manningham, City of Bradford; England
- Coordinates: 53.808882°N 1.760013°W
- Grid reference: SE159347
- Platforms: 2

Other information
- Status: Disused

History
- Original company: Leeds and Bradford Railway
- Pre-grouping: Midland Railway
- Post-grouping: London, Midland and Scottish Railway

Key dates
- 1868: Opened
- 1965: Closed
Location

Manningham railway station was a railway station in Manningham, near Bradford, West Yorkshire, England between 1868 and 1965.

== History ==
It became the first stop from Bradford on the Midland Railway (originally the Leeds and Bradford Railway), built in 1846. The Midland became part of the LMS in 1923, and British Railways in 1948.

Manningham station opened on 17 February 1868. It was located north of the bridge of Queens Road (A6177 road) across the railway line.

From 1872, there was an extensive network of sidings and sheds, known as Manningham motive power depot, to the north of the station.

The station was closed following the Beeching Axe on 20 March 1965; unlike the next station on the line, Frizinghall, it has not reopened.

In the 1950s, and up to closure in 1965, the Bradford Railway Circle used a hut on the platform at Manningham station for its meetings.

=== Stationmasters ===
In 1908 the station was placed under the supervision of the stationmaster at Bradford for a period of time.

- George Patrick ca. 1879 - 1901
- David Bennett Smith 1901 - 1908 (formerly station master at Gargrave, afterwards station master at Keighley)
- Robert Little 1926 - 1933 (also station master at Frizinghall, afterwards station master at Tutbury)
- Thomas Hagley 1933 - 1939. (formerly station master at Menston, also station master at Frizinghall)
- John Fell 1939 - 1945 (also station master at Frizinghall)
- F.W. Garnett 1945 - (also station master at Frizinghall)

== Possible re-opening ==
In January 2008, it was revealed that the City of Bradford prepared a bid to the Regional Transport Board for £10 million, which, combined with the £10 million the council received from the sale of Leeds Bradford Airport would provide funding for the reopening of Manningham station, as well as a number of other road infrastructure projects in the Aire Valley.

== Connections ==
Preceding station	Historical railways	Following station
Bradford Forster Square; Line & station open	Midland Railway; Leeds and Bradford Extension Railway	Frizinghall; Line & station open

Dates	Company or line	Preceding station	Following station
1868–1875	Midland	Bradford Midland	Shipley
1875–1923	Midland	Bradford Midland	Frizinghall
1923–1948	LMS	Forster Square	Frizinghall
1948–1965	British Railways	Forster Square	Frizinghall
