= Truncated railway station termini =

A truncated railway station terminus is an original railway station site that is sold for redevelopment and a new, usually smaller station is being constructed back down the line. There are many examples of station buildings and other structures, such as the redundant platforms at Whitby, being sold for redevelopment. The truncation however, was only partial, as one platform still survives in its original location. Many stations have had platforms truncated to accommodate larger concourses, such as London King's Cross and London Liverpool Street This article, however, is about new stations that have been fully truncated and cut short from a former location.

Truncating happens usually when traffic has declined so much that an original station site is no longer required and the land is deemed to have a greater commercial value. Money gained from the sale of a station site can then be reinvested in new facilities.

However, the newly constructed stations can often be sited farther away from a town or city centre. Many old stations have been redeveloped as shopping destinations, with the aim of generating footfall from passengers as they walk to the new platforms. The policy of truncating still continues, and a plan under discussion would relocate Lowestoft some 400 metres to the west and redevelop the land for retail.

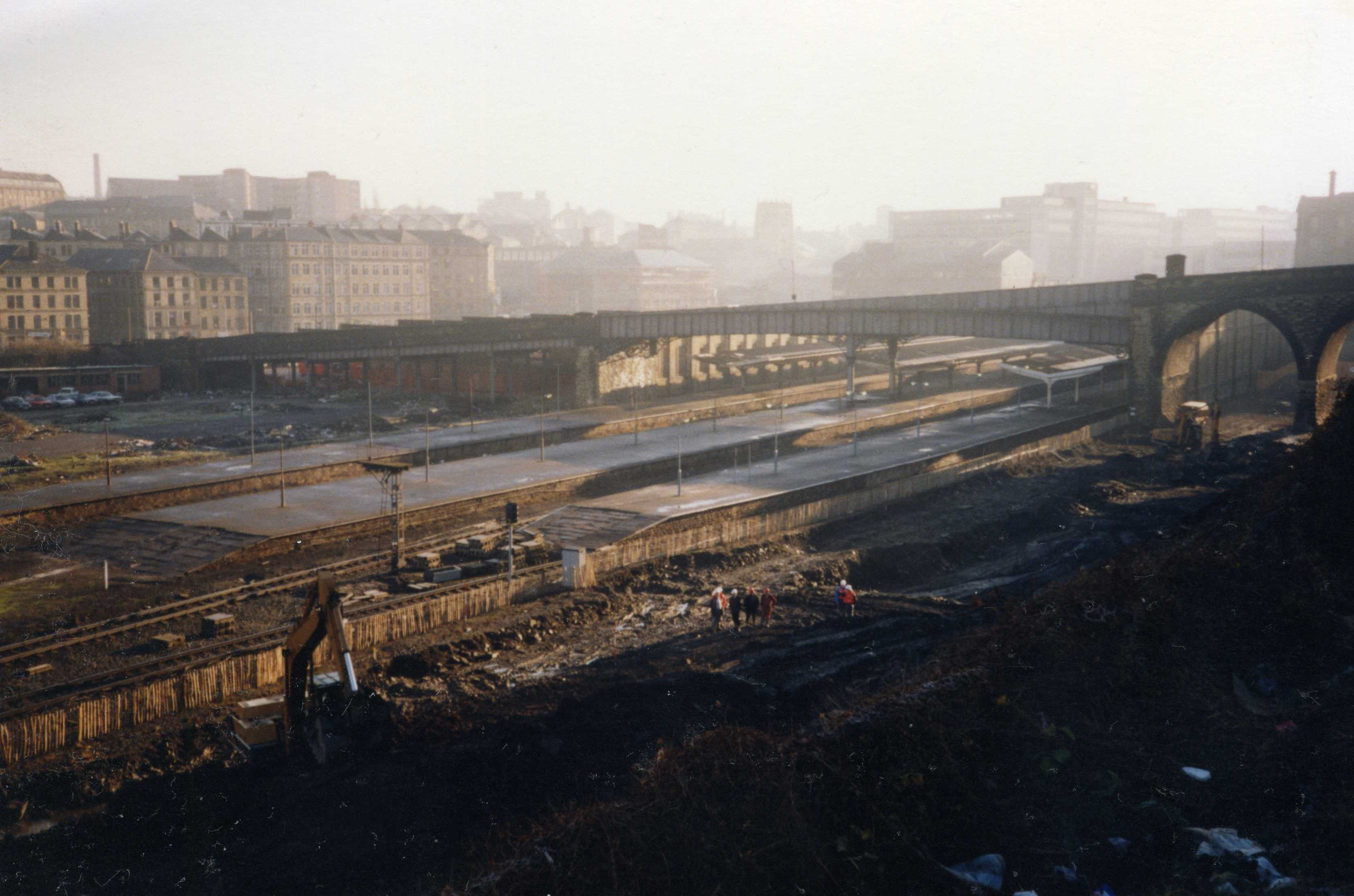
Old Bradford Forster Square station prior to demolition in 1990. Construction workers can be seen in the foreground ready to start work on the new station

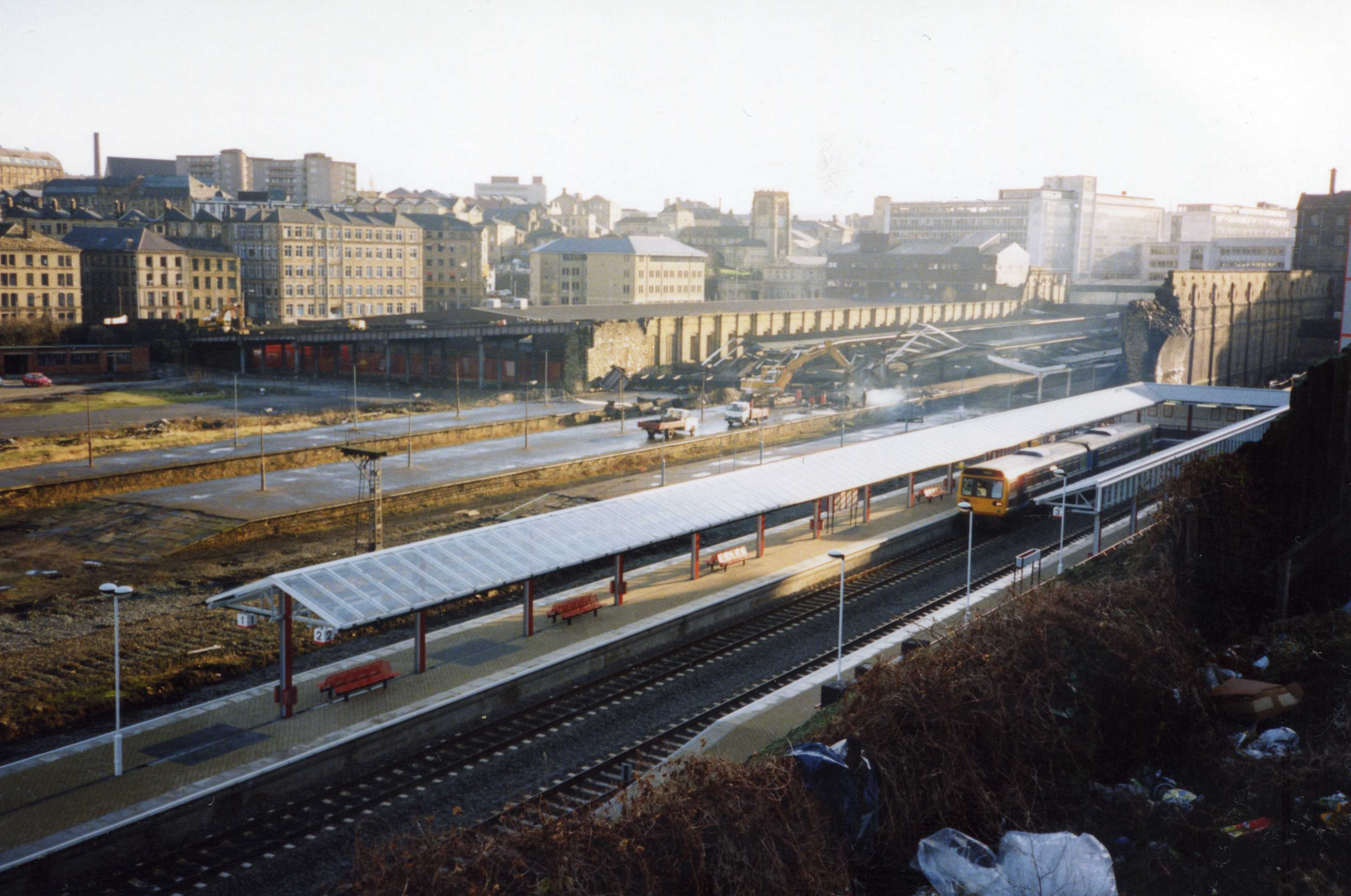
The new truncated Bradford Forster Square station just after opening with the old station in the background. The old station was closer to the city centre

Station	Notes
Balloch	The original terminus of the North Clyde Line extended right up to the shores of the Loch Lomond. Following the end of steamer services, Balloch Pier fell into decline and closed in September 1986. Balloch Central, the next stop down the line, was later closed in April 1988 to avoid the Balloch Road level crossing. The modern truncated station is called simply Balloch.
Blackpool South	The former Blackpool Central station was right in the heart of the town, but there was a decline in traffic and Blackpool North became the principal station. Blackpool Central was thus closed, with the railway cut right down so that the land could be redeveloped for car and coach parking.
Bradford Forster Square	In 1990, a new smaller station was constructed about 100 m back down the line. The original station site was to be redeveloped as part of a new shopping centre, but due to the early 1990s recession stopped that from happening. A new tax office was later built on the site.
Bradford Interchange	The original Bradford Exchange station was closed in 1972, and a new station was constructed about 100 metres to the south, as part of a combined rail and bus station facility. There has long been an aspiration to link both of Bradford's railway stations via a cross city link. However, the policy of truncation reduces any chance of that ever happening.
Falmouth Docks	resited December 1970
Felixstowe	A new smaller station was constructed to the east of the original in the 1980s, with much of the old site becoming a car park and a shopping centre called 'Great Eastern Square'. The original station building, as well as some of the original platform canopies, still survives as a pub/restaurant.
Fort William	The original station was alongside Loch Linnhe and was combined with a ferry pier. To facilitate the construction of a new road, a new station was built in 1975, about half a mile to the west of the original.
Henley-on-Thames	The station was cut back in 1975.
London Victoria	Brighton-bound platforms were truncated in the 1980s to make way for extra shops as part of the Victoria Place Shopping Centre development.
London Waterloo	The old Eurostar platforms (20 to 24) closed in 2007 and were cut back by several metres to create a new concourse when they reopened for domestic use.
Looe	The original station extended 100 metres in the town and was connected to the quayside. The new station opened in April 1968.
Morecambe	The old Morecambe Promenade station closed in February 1994, with a new, smaller station built 400 metres to the west. The old station building survives as a pub/restaurant, with the rest of the site now occupied by a cinema and an indoor market.
North Berwick	The North Berwick branch line had been under threat of closure following the publication of the Beeching Report in the 1960s. By the 1980s the threat of closure had gone, but the old station was demolished and a new car park and residential development was built in its place. At the same time, a smaller, unstaffed station, with cut-back platforms, was built back down the line.
Redditch	
Saltburn railway station	Rationalised in 1974. Only the two excursion platforms remains. The old stations buildings are now used for retail and housing.
Sheringham	Replaced original station in 1967 allowing a level crossing to be closed
St Ives	The original station was nearer to the town and had a long curved platform. The new station (with a straight platform) was constructed down the line in the early 1970s. Much of the old station site is now a car park.
Stourbridge Town	
Sudbury	In 1991, to make way for the construction of the Kingfisher Leisure Centre, the station was re-sited to the edge of the town centre, making it the third station site.
Uckfield	The station was moved across the road in 1991, allowing the level crossing to be closed. The platforms and tracks are still in situ, albeit overgrown, with the building having been demolished in 2000.
Walton-on-the-Naze	Only the bay platform survives from the original station layout. The main platforms ran a few metres further on to the original station buildings. Most of this land is now a car park, and the old station house converted into flats.
Windermere	The original train shed is now a Booths supermarket, with a new truncated station constructed 50 metres back down the line in 1986.
Windsor & Eton Central	The site redeveloped as the Royal Windsor Shopping Centre, and only one truncated platform of the old station remains.
Wrexham Central	Resited in 1998 to accommodate Island Green Retail Park.
