= Forster Square =

Open space in central Bradford, England

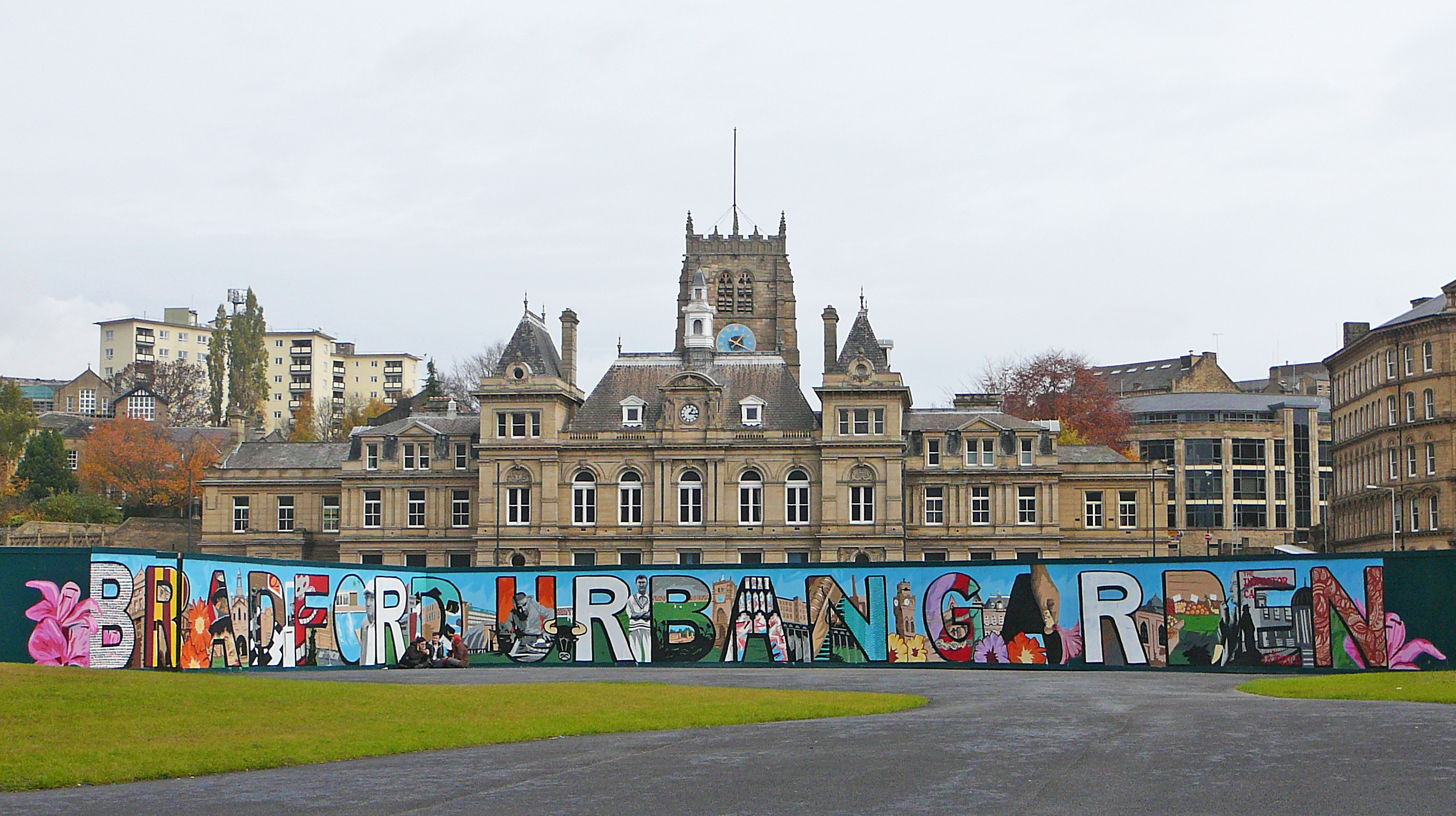
Mural at the temporary Urban Garden

Forster Square was a prominent and famous landmark in central Bradford, until being "redeveloped", i.e. effectively demolished, in the (2006) Broadway development. Its name is remembered in Bradford Forster Square railway station, retail park and a stretch of road in front of Kala Sangam opposite the statue of William Edward Forster.

== History ==
Forster Square was laid out in the late-19th century at the bottom of Kirkgate, and named after the 19th-century prominent politician William Edward Forster, long-time MP for Bradford and Education minister in Gladstone's government. Until 1958, it was a spacious city square, triangular in shape, with public gardens and a statue of Forster in the centre; it was also a busy hub for bus and tram services.

Forster Square railway station fronted partly onto the square from 1924 until 1990, when the current station of that name opened 300 metres (1,000 ft) to the north. The former station was demolished.

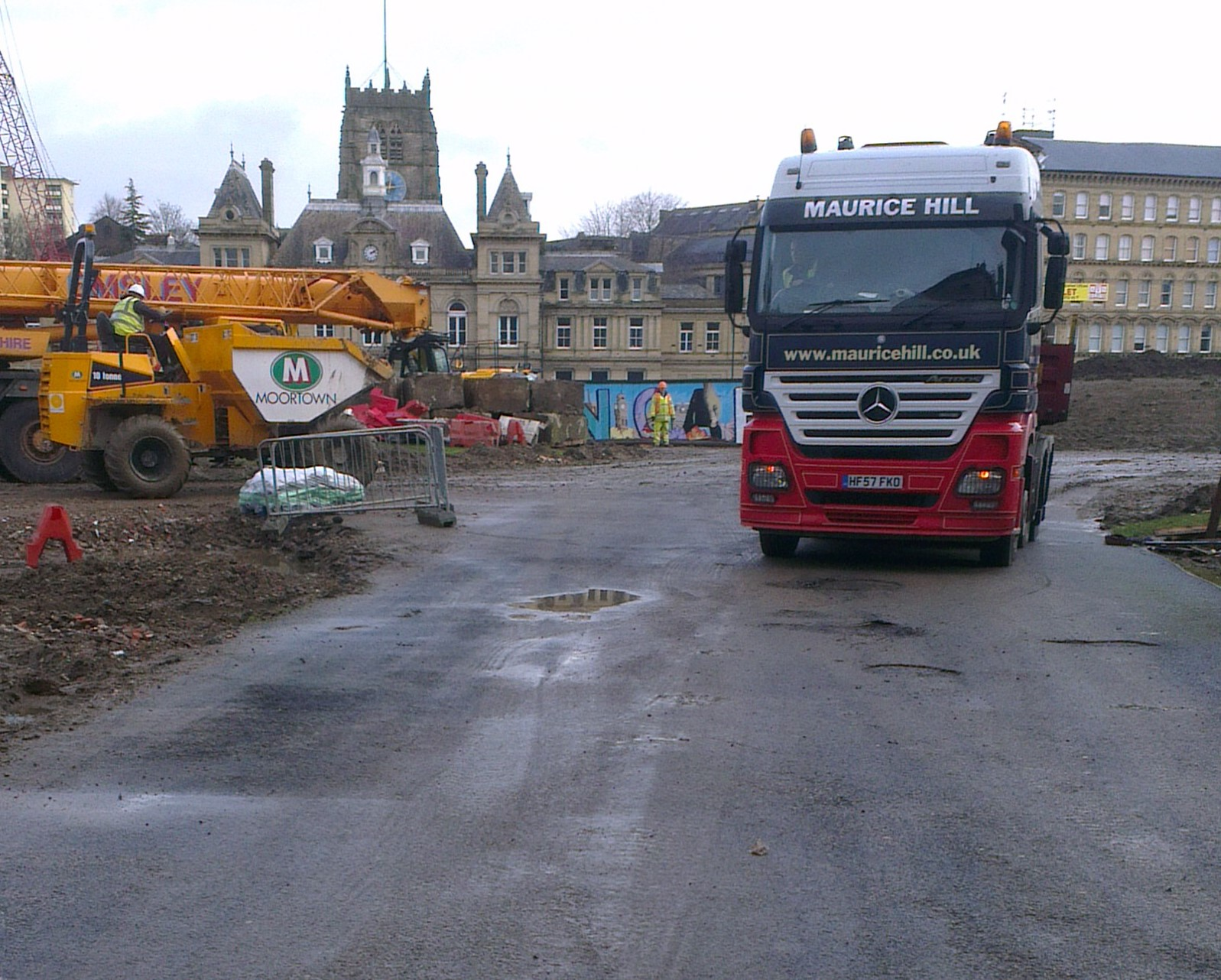
Building work began again in January 2014, beginning by demolishing the temporary urban park which had occupied part of the site since 2010.

In the 1950s and 1960s, much of central Bradford was redeveloped to the design of Stanley Wardley. This included a new main road, Petergate, linking a remodelled Forster Square to Leeds Road at Eastbrook Well roundabout. Part of the gardens remained as a walled enclave in a busy traffic roundabout, accessible to pedestrians only by underpasses. Two large buildings were built on the west side: Central House and Forster House, a John Poulson design. Apart from the railway station, the only building fronting the square that survived redevelopment was St Peter's House, which was once the central post office.

On 18 March 2004, work began to clear the site of Forster Square for redevelopment as part of the Broadway project. Forster House was demolished to make room for the new development. A new road (Lower Kirkgate) was built linking the junction of Kirkgate and Cheapside with the junction of Canal Road and Bolton Road. There is no longer a through route from the north (Canal Road or Manor Row) to Leeds Road since then.

In late 2006, the site was empty and flat except for a large pile of rubble in one part of the site. For the first time for many years, St Peter's House and Bradford Cathedral behind it are visible from the centre of the city.

Construction work on the Broadway project was expected to be completed in 2007. Developers Westfield said that work would not commence until tenants were found.

== Archaeological discoveries ==
Since the demolition, archaeologists have had a chance to excavate the area between Forster Square and Cheapside. They have found traces of what were most probably 16th-century buildings. Smaller finds have also been found such as coins, pottery and clay tobacco pipes, a bone spoon and a bone toothbrush.

Andrea Burgess, senior archaeologist at West Yorkshire Archaeology Advisory Service, said:

These are the first real field excavations in the centre of Bradford and we've got historical evidence about the streets in 17th and 18th century Bradford but we've never really come across the physical remains of the people that lived here. Some of the work is still very preliminary but it seems to be that the earliest findings date from the 17th century. We've got the remains of buildings with some hint of some industrial processes going on down by the beck, a good water source there for industrial activity. It's the earliest archaeological evidence we've got from Bradford so when we actually get the analytical results through it's going to be very exciting.

She also hoped that the findings would reveal more about life in Bradford during the English Civil War:

Bradford played quite a big part in the Civil War. There are some wonderful etchings - drawings of the parish church right next to the site - with woolsacks hanging from the top of the tower to protect it from assault during attack. There are written accounts of the troops coming into Bradford and crossing the beck and we know they took refuge in houses that were around the beck at that time. It is not confirmed yet but some of the remains that were found during the excavation could be the right date to coincide with the Civil War so at least it will give us an idea of what people were writing about. There are going to be archaeologists monitoring the Forster Square redevelopment as the work goes on so that they can salvage and record any other information that turns up. Otherwise it completely depends on where the development is as to whether we recommend whether any archaeological work is done.

== See also ==
- Little Germany, Bradford

== Bibliography ==
- Firth, Gary (1997). A History of Bradford. The History Press Ltd. ISBN 1-86077-057-6.
