= Stanley Wardley =

- Born: 13 January 1901; Hendon
- Died: 1965 (aged 63–64)
- Engineering career
- Projects: Wardley House

Stanley Gordon Wardley (13 January 1901 – 15 February 1965) was a British civil engineer and urban planner. He was City Engineer for Bradford during the major redevelopment of Bradford city centre in the 1950s and 1960s. Although generally favourably received during his lifetime, his reshaping of Bradford has since been extensively criticised and undone in large part.

== Biography ==
Wardley was born on 13 January 1901 in Hendon. He was appointed City Engineer and Surveyor for Bradford in January 1946.

Wardley House, the building that houses the National Media Museum among other things, was named after him.

== Redevelopment ==
Wardley's vision was for a new city 'with provision for a continuous self-regulating flow of traffic', and the buildings that were erected were modernist. The local sandstone was rejected as a building material. Many much-loved buildings were demolished to make way for the 'city of the future', and there was eventually considerable opposition. J. B. Priestley and David Hockney were among those who protested in vain against the demolition of the Swan Arcade in 1962.

In 2005 one of the icons of Wardley's redevelopment, Forster House, was demolished as part of the 'Broadway development' (see Forster Square, Bradford). Other recent changes have seen reversals of 1960s planning in Bradford, e.g. filling in of pedestrian under-passes and promotion of traffic-calming measures, and attempts to promote residential use of the city centre, as opposed to 1960s zoning.

== See also ==
- Urban planning
