= Frizinghall railway station =

Railway station in West Yorkshire, England

Frizinghall
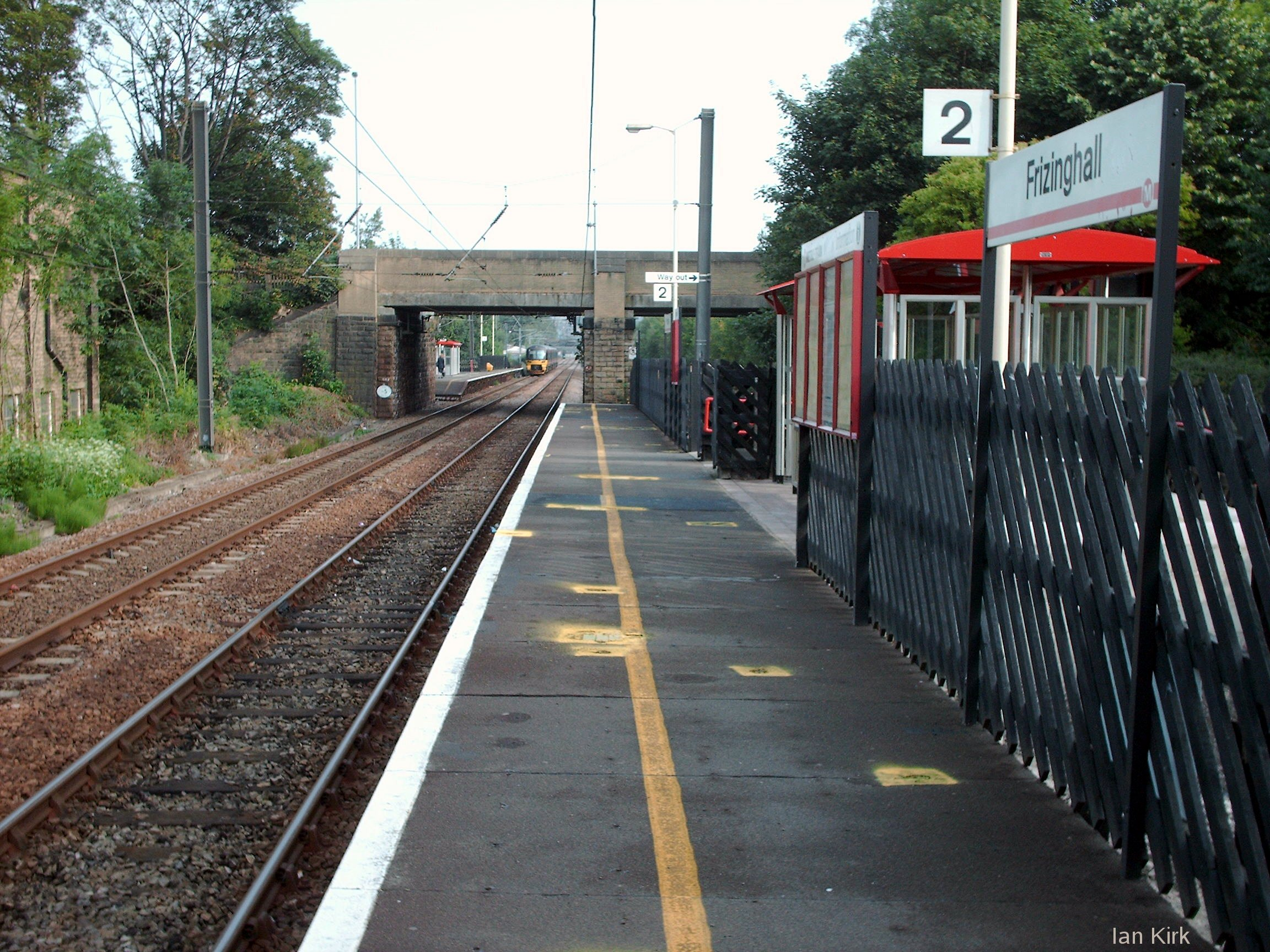
- Platform 2

General information
- Location: Frizinghall, City of Bradford; England
- Coordinates: 53.8200°N 1.7686°W
- Grid reference: SE153359
- Manager: Northern Trains
- Transit authority: West Yorkshire (Metro)
- Platforms: 2

Other information
- Station code: FZH
- Fare zone: 3
- Classification: DfT category F1

History
- Original company: Midland Railway
- Pre-grouping: Midland Railway
- Post-grouping: London, Midland and Scottish Railway

Key dates
- 1 February 1875: Station opened
- 22 March 1965: Closed
- 7 September 1987: Reopened

Passengers
- 2021/22: ▲0.341 million
- 2022/23: ▲0.373 million
- 2023/24: ▲0.403 million
- 2024/25: ▲0.433 million
- 2025/26: ▲0.446 million
Location
Notes
- Passenger statistics from the Office of Rail and Road

Frizinghall railway station is situated in the Frizinghall district of Bradford, West Yorkshire, England. It is an unstaffed halt on the Airedale Line, 2 miles (3 km) north of Bradford Forster Square. The station, and all trains serving it, are operated by Northern Trains.

== History ==
Frizinghall station was opened by the Midland Railway on 1 February 1875. It remained in operation until it was closed on 22 March 1965, a casualty of the Beeching Axe. However, the line on which it stood remained open, and 22 years later, the West Yorkshire Passenger Transport Executive and British Rail reopened the station.

The original station had two platforms opposite each other on the north side of Frizinghall Road, but the current station, opened on 7 September 1987, has its two platforms separated: the northbound platform is approximately where it was before, and the southbound is to the south of Frizinghall Road.

Bradford Grammar School was relocated to Frizinghall in the late 1940s. From then until closure, and again after reopening, pupils have constituted one of the main sources of traffic at the station. Indeed, it was an English teacher at Bradford Grammar School, Dr Robin Sisson, who actively fought for the Frizinghall station to reopen. Sisson was killed in a car accident in Sheffield on 24 June 2008.

Frizinghall signal box, which was removed in 1971, is preserved in working order at Damems Junction, on the Keighley and Worth Valley Railway.

=== Stationmasters ===
- Joseph Mawby 1876 - 1891
- J.W. Smales 1891 - 1926
- Robert Little 1926 - 1933 (also station master at Manningham, afterwards station master at Tutbury)
- Thomas Hagley 1933 - 1939 (formerly station master at Menston, also station master at Manningham)
- John Fell 1939 - 1945
- F.W. Garnett 1945 - (also station master at Manningham)

== Facilities ==
The station is not staffed, but ticket machines are provided. There are shelters on both platforms, along with digital information screens; a long-line P.A system also provides train running information. Step-free access to each platform is via ramps from the road bridge.

== Services ==
Frizinghall is served by trains from Bradford Forster Square towards Leeds (on the Leeds-Bradford Line), Skipton (on the Airedale Line) and Ilkley (on the Wharfedale Line). Monday to Saturday daytimes, trains operate every 30 minutes each way to Leeds and hourly to Skipton and Ilkley.

During the evenings, there are trains every hour to/from each of Skipton and Ilkley plus an hourly service between Forster Square and Shipley. At these times there are no trains to Leeds, though connections are available at Shipley into/out of the Skipton - Leeds service.

On Sundays, trains run twice each hour to Bradford, every hour to Leeds (until end of service) and hourly to each of Ilkley and Skipton.

Preceding station	National Rail	Following station
Bradford Forster Square	Northern Trains; Leeds-Bradford Line	Shipley
Bradford Forster Square	Northern Trains; Airedale Line	Shipley
Bradford Forster Square	Northern Trains; Wharfedale Line	Shipley
	Historical railways	
Manningham; Line open, station closed	Midland Railway; Leeds and Bradford Extension Railway	Shipley; Line and station open
Manningham; Line open, station closed	Midland Railway; Leeds and Bradford Railway	Shipley; Line and station open
