= Bradford Forster Square railway station =

Railway station in West Yorkshire, England

Bradford Forster Square
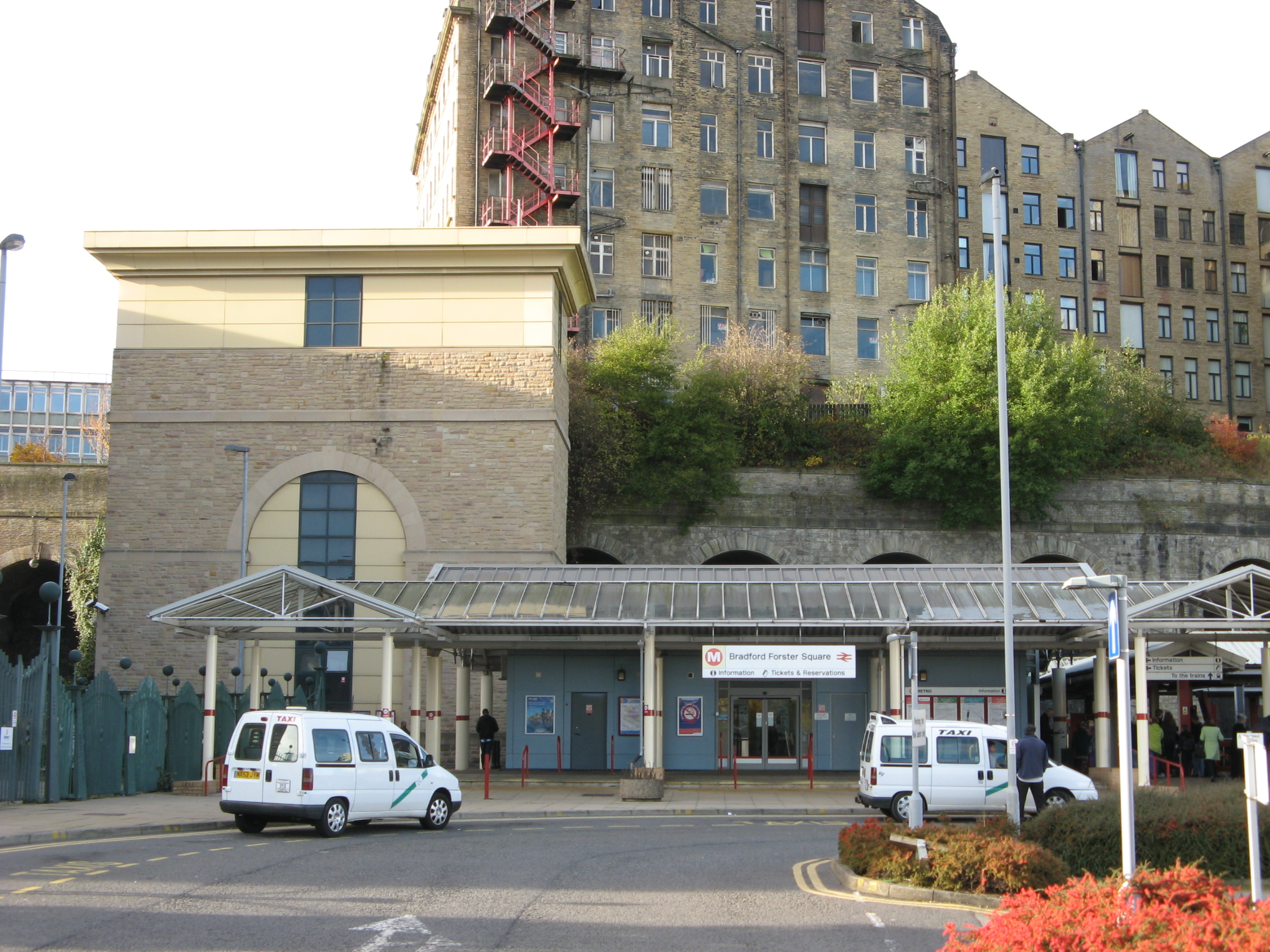
- View of the station entrance

General information
- Location: Bradford, City of Bradford; England
- Coordinates: 53.7970°N 1.7529°W
- Grid reference: SE163334
- Manager: Northern Trains
- Transit authority: West Yorkshire (Metro; 19??-2014)
- Platforms: 4

Other information
- Station code: BDQ
- Fare zone: 3
- Classification: DfT category C2

History
- Original company: Leeds and Bradford Railway

Key dates
- 1846: Opened
- 1853: Rebuilt
- 1890: Rebuilt
- 1990: Rebuilt on new site

Passengers
- 2021/22: ▲1.301 million
- Interchange: ▲27,144
- 2022/23: ▲1.438 million
- Interchange: ▲27,880
- 2023/24: ▼1.426 million
- Interchange: ▲34,252
- 2024/25: ▲1.457 million
- Interchange: ▲35,780
- 2025/26: ▲1.812 million
- Interchange: ▲46,170
Location
Notes
- Passenger statistics from the Office of Rail and Road

Bradford Forster Square railway station serves Bradford, West Yorkshire, England. The majority of services to and from the station are operated by Northern Trains; they run on the Airedale line to Skipton, the Wharfedale line to Ilkley and the Leeds–Bradford line to Leeds. The London North Eastern Railway LNER also run intercity trains from the station via the East Coast Main Line to London King's Cross.

The other main railway station in the city is Bradford Interchange, which is about 10 minutes on foot from Forster Square; from here, services operate along the Calder Valley line to Leeds, Halifax, Huddersfield, Manchester Victoria, Blackpool North and London King's Cross.

== History ==
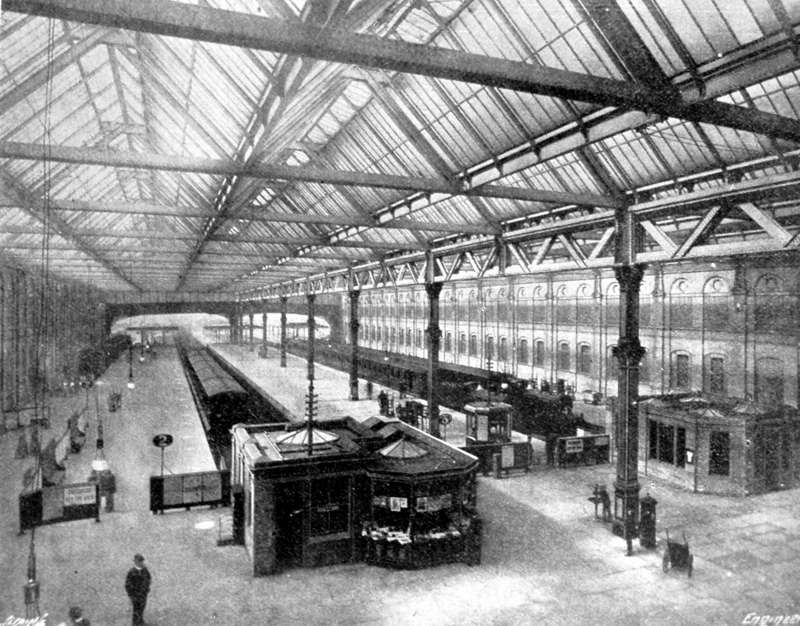
Bradford Midland Station after 1887–90 rebuilding. Interior of the trainshed.

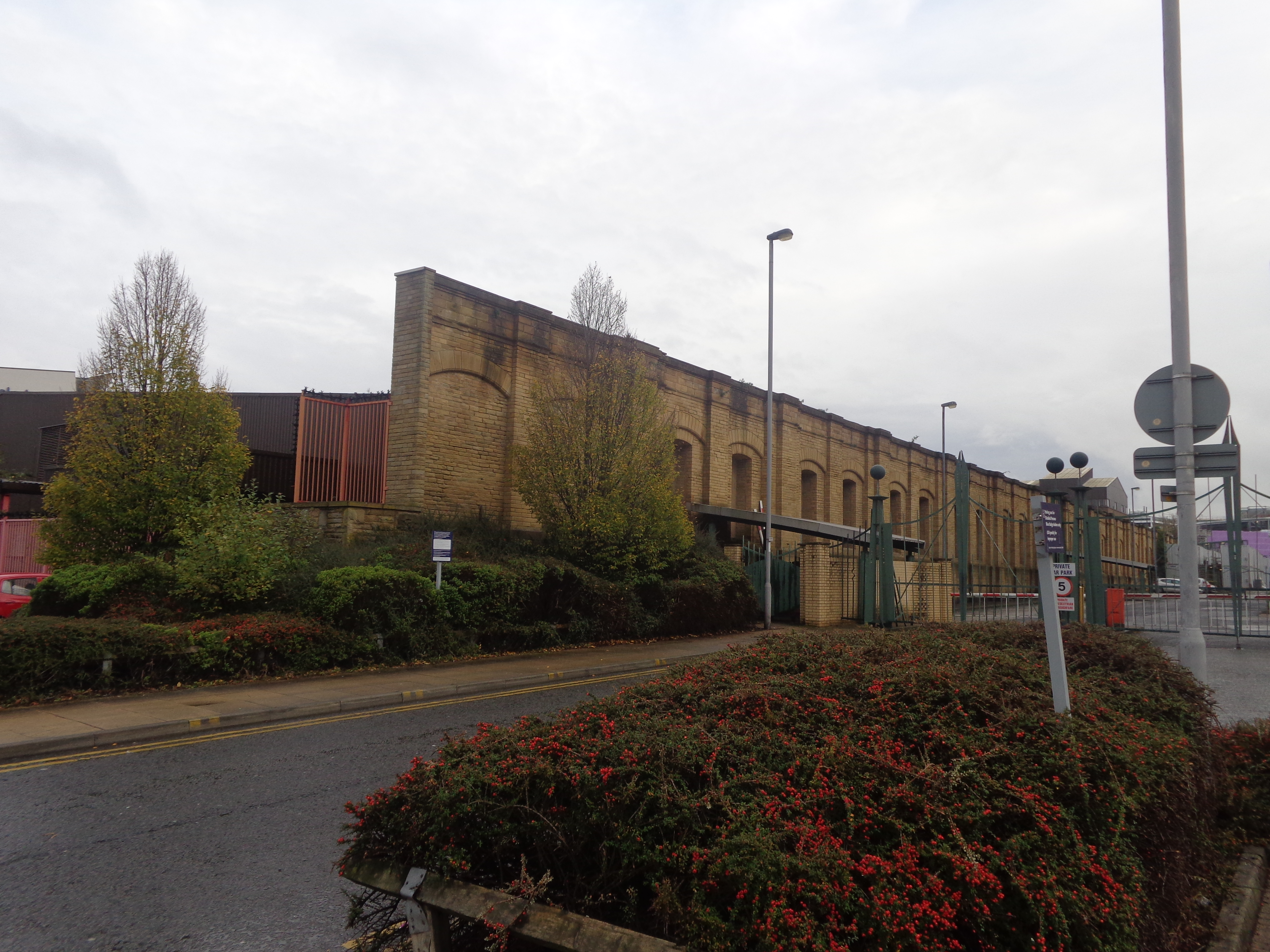
The remains of the old Forster Square station train shed wall. Its replacement is behind the photographer.

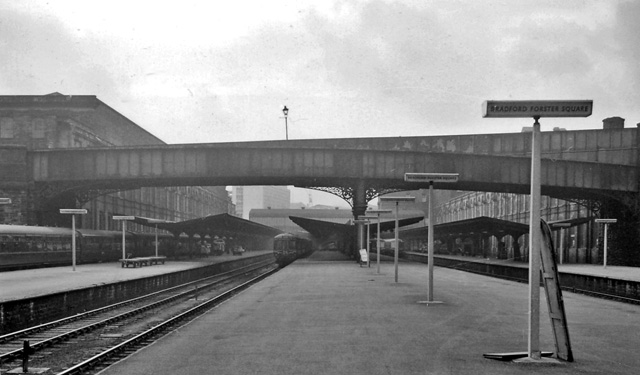
View southward, towards buffer-stops in 1961

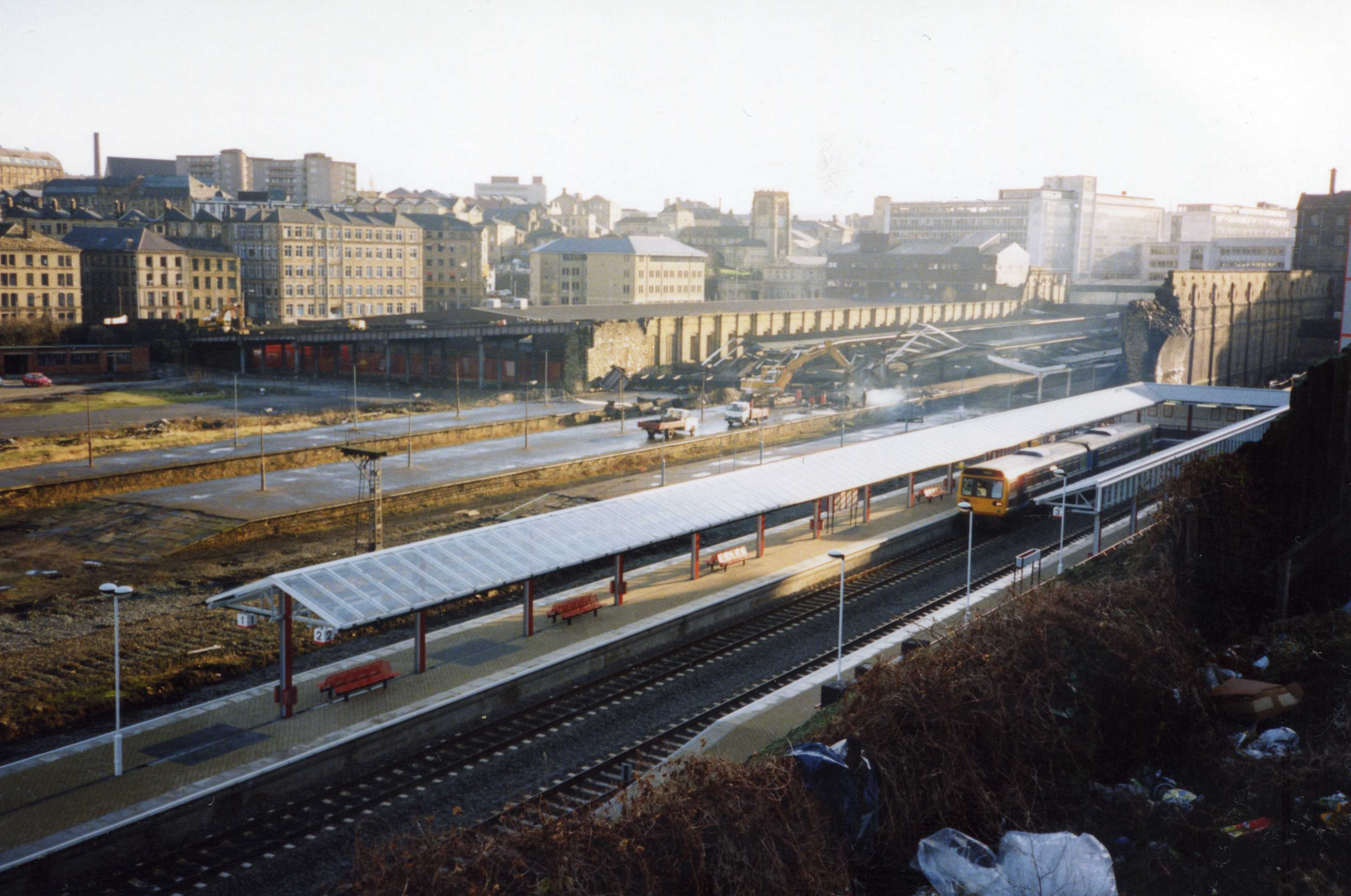
The original station being demolished and the new station just after opening in 1990.

The first rail service into Bradford was opened by the Leeds and Bradford Railway on 1 July 1846. The line approached the town from the north, up Bradford Dale from Shipley, and terminated at a railway station on Kirkgate, opposite the end of Market Street. There were hourly services to Leeds Wellington Station, and through trains to London Euston via Derby and Rugby.

The first railway station building was an imposing neoclassical building designed by William Andrews. By 1853, the Midland Railway had acquired the Leeds and Bradford, and rebuilt the station. The new building was larger, but less interesting architecturally.

In 1890, the railway station was again replaced. The Midland Railway's architect Charles Trubshaw designed a large complex containing the passenger station, goods station and the Midland Hotel. The station had six platforms and an overall glazed roof of the ridge and furrow pattern. The station was also used by the North Eastern Railway. The station began to be called Market Street Station at this time, but local maps and directories do not confirm this (see Station name below).

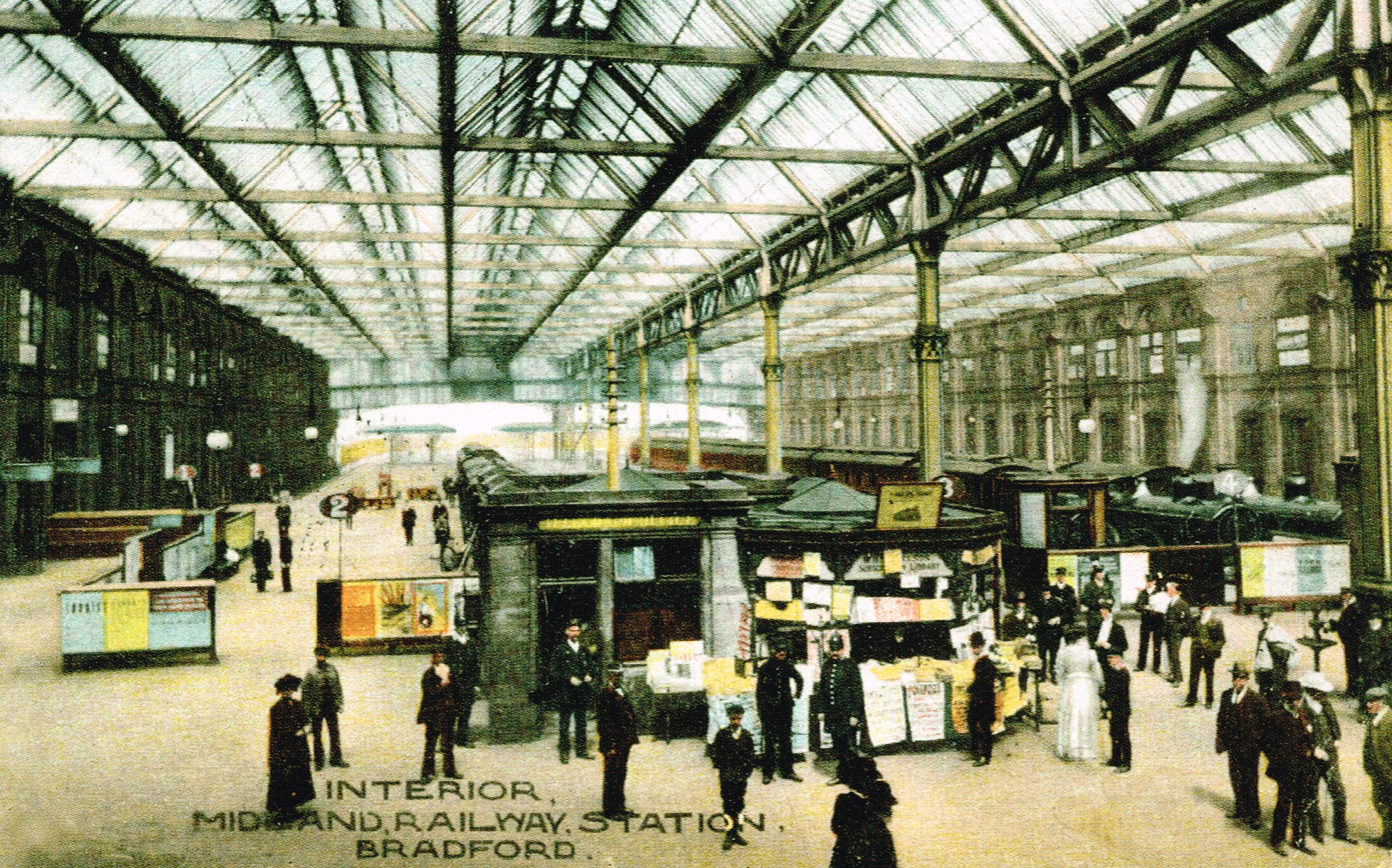
Bradford Forster Square station before 1909

By 1906, Forster Square had been built just south-east of the railway station, but the name Forster Square Station was not used until 1924.

In 1953–54 the station underwent £60,000 (equivalent to £1,500,000 in 2025) of improvements. The glass and steel canopy covering the station was removed and "umbrella type" covers were installed over each platform, leaving the rails clear.

In March 1963, the Beeching Report recommended the closure of all railways serving Wharfedale, and the removal of several services out of Forster Square. As a consequence, many railway stations closed in 1965, and local services to Leeds ceased. However, the decision to close was deferred for some of the lines. In 1972, Bradford Corporation (now City of Bradford Metropolitan District Council), together with several other local authorities in the area, determined to subsidise the Wharfedale and Airedale lines. The lines have remained open, and in the ensuing years, a number of stations have been reopened. From April 1974, the new West Yorkshire Passenger Transport Executive (now known as Metro) took responsibility for those services.

Although the old Forster Square had become neglected by the late 1980s British Rail decided to transfer the Bradford to London King's Cross InterCity 125 service to the station with the first train running on 3 October 1988. Ideas were also mooted at this time on how best modernise the facilities and create a new gateway to the city. A subsequent plan emerged to sell off the existing station to developers and build a new station approximately 200m to the north. The plan was to have passengers walk past the shops to reach the relocated platforms with a daytime entrance incorporated into a new public square facing the city centre. These plans were criticised from the start when the Bradford Telegraph and Argus reported on 31 August 1989 "New Plan for Station Slammed", 'A conservation watchdog says a scheme to change the face of Bradford's shopping centre will repeat the architectural disasters of the 1960s. The Victorian Society has attacked the plan to turn Forster Square station and the Valley Road goods yard into a massive shopping complex called Broadstones. The platforms will be further away from Foster Square, accessible by the shopping mall during the day, but only Manor Row outside of opening hours. When the shopping centre is closed passengers will have to climb up Manor Row and then down again to platform level – an entirely unsatisfactory situation.' Despite such criticism Bradford Council pressed ahead with the plans bolstered by other shopping developments constructed as the same time, such as The Ridings in Wakefield. The Bradford Telegraph and Argus reported on 10 November 1989 "All change at Forster Square" The Forster Square development will mean shopping will never be the same again. It will be christened 'Broadstones'. Inside will be at least two department stores, several levels of shops and undercover rest and seating areas. There will be a multistorey car park and surface parking for 1,750 cars. ..And there is more. Included in the scheme is a new rail station. The new truncated station opened on Monday 11 June 1990 with the old station being demolished shortly after. The new station was built with three platforms. Due to the early 1990s recession the Broadstones shopping development hit financial problems before work was even started. The Bradford T&A newspaper reported on 25 July 1990 that "Prestige schemes which promise to change the face of the city have been dogged by delays." 'And even the work which has been carried out to might turn out to be a white elephant – like the new British Rail station at Forster Square which has been moved further along the track to make way for the £90 million shops plan.' Only much later when economic conditions allowed did The Broadway finally built to the south of Kirkgate in 2015. The cancellation of the Broadstones plan meant that the old station's goods entrance, to the side of the Midland Hotel, accidentally became one of the key entranceways to the new station. This entrance is characterised by a long cobbled slope and archways supporting the road above. The old station site was initially used as a car park, before a HMRC tax office Centenary Court was built. Part of the front screen arcade and the supporting east wall of the 1890 station roof still survive.

The line into Forster Square was electrified in 1994, as part of the electrification of the Airedale and Wharfedale lines. This project also included lengthening the central platform numbered 1 and 2 to accommodate through electric trains to London via the newly electrified East Coast Main Line. More recently, the pedestrian approach from Cheapside has been redeveloped in to a public space and ticket barriers installed. A new platform platform 0 was completed to the east of the station in 2025. It was officially opened on 19 May 2025 when London North Eastern Railway introduced extra services. Further plans to modernise the station as a more impressive gateway to the city have been put on hold due to ongoing development work on the proposed West Yorkshire mass transit scheme. This delay has not been without criticism as the station does not have an impressive entranceway facing the city centre, lacks toilets and other facilities such as shops and is hemmed in by the Centenary Court building.

Historically, there have been various proposals put forward which would link the two Bradford railway stations together, but none of these has yet materialised.

Over time, services have operated as follows:

Dates	Company or line	Preceding station	Following station
1846–1851	Leeds and Bradford	terminus	Manningham
1851–1923	Midland	terminus	Manningham
1923–1948	LMS	terminus	Manningham
1948–1965	British Railways/British Rail	terminus	Manningham
1965–1987	West Yorkshire Metro (trains operated by British Rail)	terminus	Shipley
1987–1997	West Yorkshire Metro (trains operated by British Rail)	terminus	Frizinghall
1997–2001	West Yorkshire Metro (trains operated by Northern Spirit)	terminus	Frizinghall
2001–2004	West Yorkshire Metro (trains operated by Arriva Trains Northern)	terminus	Frizinghall
2004–2014	West Yorkshire Metro (trains operated by Northern Rail)	terminus	Frizinghall
2014–2016	Northern Rail	terminus	Frizinghall
2016–2020	Arriva Rail North	terminus	Frizinghall
2020–Present	Northern Trains	terminus	Frizinghall

=== Station name ===
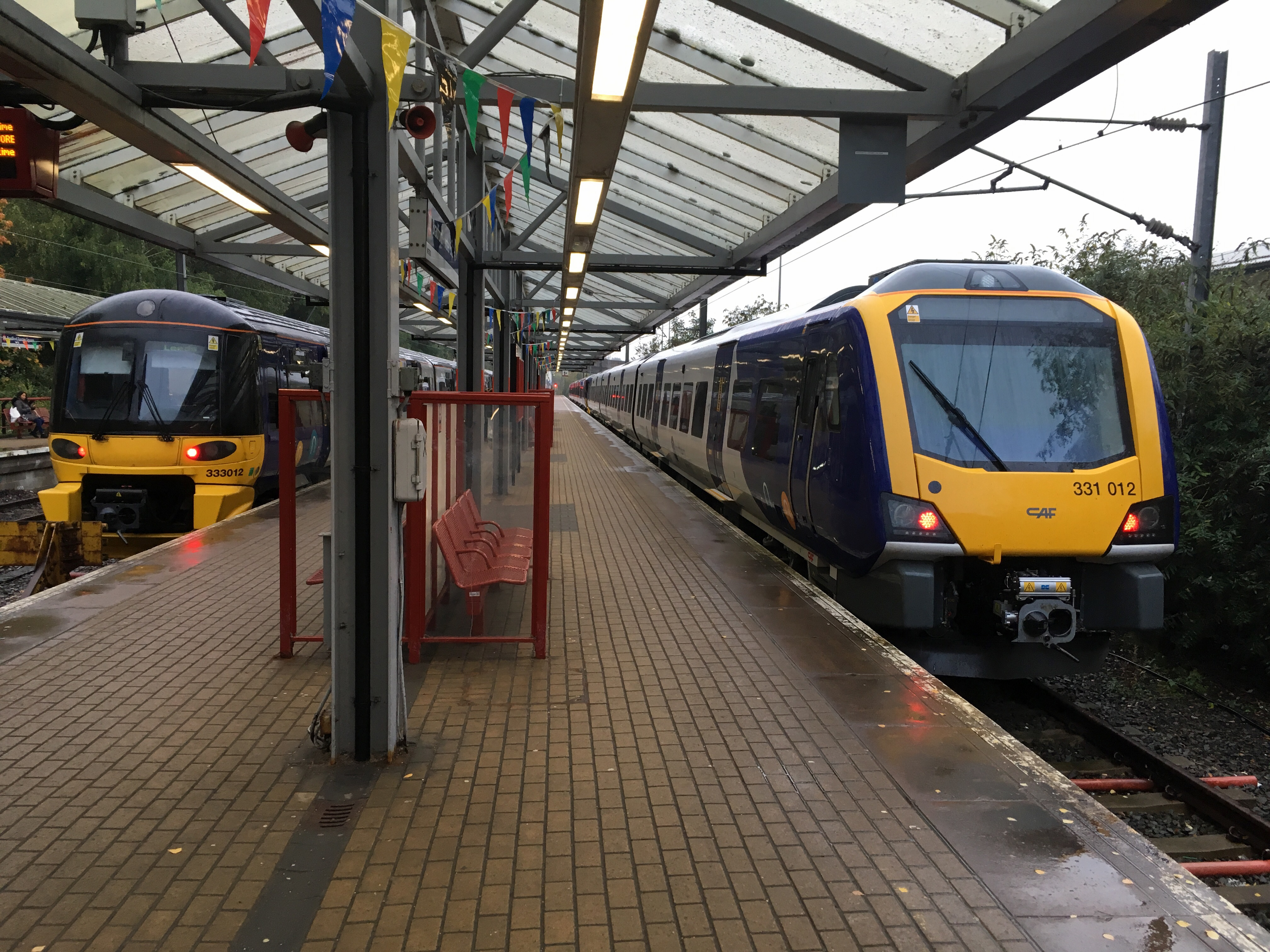
A Class 331 and Class 333 unit on platforms 0 and 1, receptively

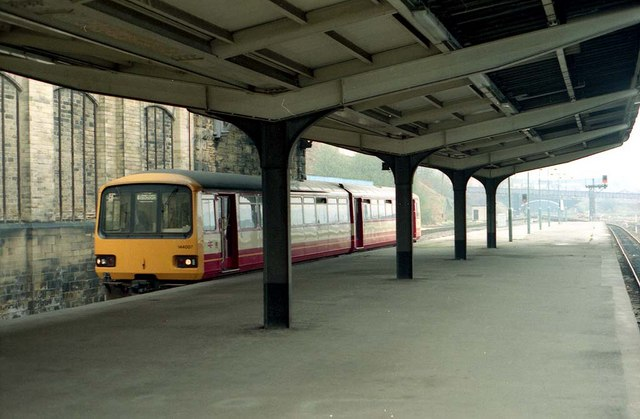
A Class 144 in the old station platforms, now demolished

There is some disagreement about what names were used and when. Most modern references state that at least one of them was called 'Market Street', but there is disagreement as to exactly when this name was in use:

- According to Alan Whitaker, it was 'Market Street' from the rebuilding in 1890 until 1924.
- Tony Dewick, p. 42, shows one of the three stations as 'Market Street' in red, which in that book indicates that the station and the name passed out of use before 1901.

W. E. Forster died in 1886, and when the nearby Central Post Office opened in 1887, Forster Square, between the Railway Station and the Post Office, had recently been named.

Throughout the 19th century, contemporary directories and maps either used the railway company name or a nearby street to identify the station. In 1852 it was the "Leeds and Bradford Railway Station". In 1863 the location was "Midland Railway, Bottom of Kirkgate".

The date of the name change has not yet been identified. In 1901, it was "The Leeds and Bradford railway ... is leased by the Midland Railway Company, and its station (called the "Midland" station) is at the bottom of Kirkgate." Again in 1908 and 1921 it was still the "Midland Station". By 1934 the station name had changed to "Forster Square Station (L.M.S.R)".

== Services ==
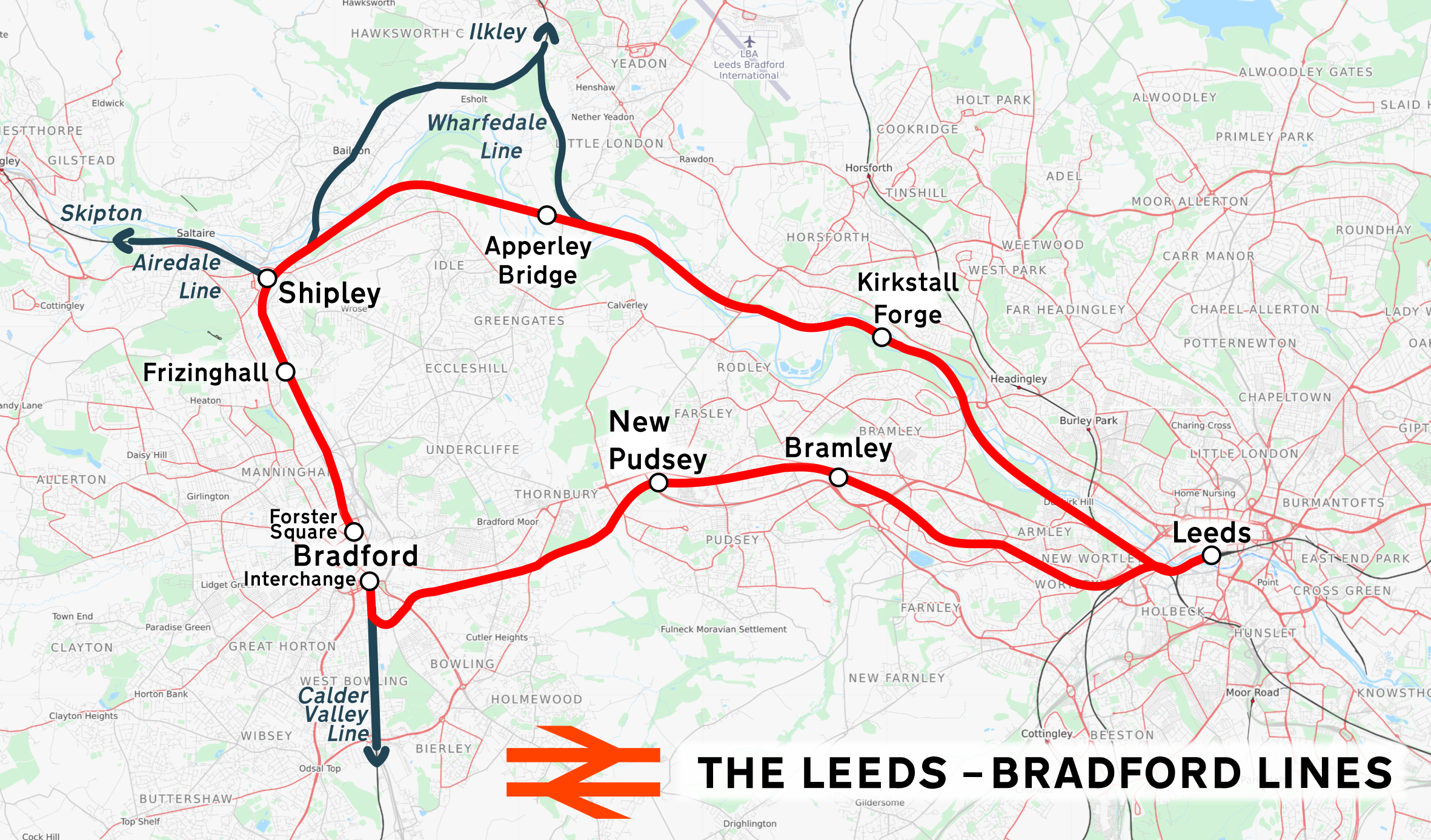
Leeds–Bradford lines and other routes

Trains from Bradford Forster Square are operated by Northern Trains and London North Eastern Railway. Most trains are run by Northern; these are towards Leeds, Skipton and Ilkley. During Monday to Saturday daytimes, trains operate every 30 minutes to Leeds and hourly on the other two routes. On weekday and Saturday evenings there are trains every hour to each of Skipton and Ilkley, but no trains run through to Leeds; instead a shuttle service runs between Bradford and Shipley, connecting there with Skipton – Leeds trains. Connections are also available at Shipley for longer distance trains to Morecambe and Carlisle; a single early direct service to Lancaster at 06:41 runs from here since the May 2022 and May 2025 timetable changes, but there's no balancing return service.

On Sundays, trains run hourly between Bradford and Leeds all day (until the end of service) and to both Skipton and Ilkley. The latter two routes were upgraded from two-hourly frequencies at the December 2017 timetable change.

London North Eastern Railway operates two services each way (only one on Sundays) per day via Leeds and the East Coast Main Line to London King's Cross. In January 2024, £24 million was allocated for a fourth platform at the station to allow more flexibility. LNER will subsequently be able to provide up to five services a day for Bradford's 2025 City of Culture events.

Preceding station	National Rail	Following station
Shipley	London North Eastern Railway; East Coast Main Line	Terminus
Frizinghall	Northern Trains; Airedale line	Terminus
Frizinghall	Northern Trains; Wharfedale line	Terminus
Frizinghall	Northern Trains; Leeds–Bradford lines	Terminus
	Historical railways	
Manningham	Midland Railway; Leeds and Bradford Extension Railway	Terminus
Manningham	Midland Railway; Leeds and Bradford Railway	Terminus
