= David Oxtoby =

David Oxtoby may refer to:

- David W. Oxtoby (born 1951), American chemist and college president
- David Oxtoby (artist) (born 1938), British artist
