= Horsforth Hall Park Cricket Club =

Cricket club in Horsforth, England

Horsforth Hall Park Cricket Club was formed in 1890, following the merger of the Airedale Wanderers and Horsforth Old Cricket Clubs at a meeting held on Tuesday 29 July 1890, at the Old King's Arms, Horsforth.

Mr. S. W. Duncan was elected the first President of the club, whilst Mr. J. H. Barrett and Mr. J. W. Bentley were appointed Vice Presidents. Secretarial duties were shared between Mr. A. Longfellow and Mr. W. A. West. Mr. W. Braithwaite was elected treasurer. It was agreed that the committee shall consist of four non playing members from each of the original clubs plus captains, secretaries and treasurer.

Matches in the 1891 season were arranged with Harrogate, Harrogate Cyphers, Pudsey St. Lawrence, Guiseley, Rawdon, Calverley St. Wilfrid's, Farsley and Bramley on Saturday afternoons with two Monday matches against Leeds CC were also promised.

First Class and International players who have played for the club over the years include Charles Hardisty, Hedley Verity, Corey Collymore and Graham Roope.

The club were a founder member of the Airedale & Wharfedale Senior Cricket League since its reformation in 1936 and remains a member today. They currently play in Horsforth Hall Park

The 1st XI has won the league championship on four occasions, once jointly and the Waddilove Cup on three occasions the most recent in 2002. The 2nd XI have won their league championship on four occasions, and the Birtwhistle Cup on four occasions, the most recent in 1988. The club won the Burmah Oil Club Champions Trophy for the combined points from both 1st & 2nd XI in 1980.
