= Hardisty =

Hardisty may refer to:

- Hardisty (surname)
- Hardisty, Alberta, a town in Canada
  - Hardisty Airport
- Hardisty (Edmonton), an area in Edmonton, Alberta, Canada
- Mount Hardisty, Jasper National Park, Canada
- Harry Collinge High School, Hinton, Alberta, Canada, originally named Hardisty School

== See also ==
- Hardesty (disambiguation)
