= Horsforth Hall Park =

Park in West Yorkshire

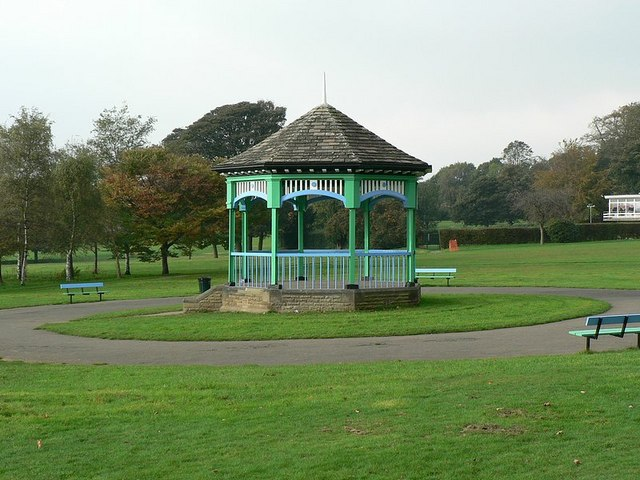
- Bandstand at Horsforth Hall Park
- Interactive map of Horsforth Hall Park
- Location: Horsforth, West Yorkshire
- Nearest city: Leeds
- OS grid: SE234380
- Coordinates: 53.837°N 1.648°W
- Area: 3.38 hectares (8.4 acres)
- Created: 1932
- Operator: Leeds City Council

Horsforth Hall Park is a 3.38 hectares (8.4 acres) community park in Horsforth, West Yorkshire, England, approximately six miles from Leeds city centre.

The park takes its name from Horsforth Hall which was built in 1699 and demolished in 1953 because it had become structurally unsafe. Some of the outbuildings remain including the stables which is a grade II listed building.

== Features ==
The park's attractions include large spaces of open parkland, a cricket pitch (home of home of Horsforth Hall Park Cricket Club), a bowling green, an adventure playground and a bandstand. A Japanese Garden was added to the park in 1987.

It also hosts a specially designed playground for under eights that allows disabled and able bodied children to play together, designed in collaboration with Mencap.

== Horsforth Hall ==
John Stanhope (1678–1736) built Horsforth Hall shortly before his 21st birthday. He mentioned in a letter to his brother dated 22 May 1699 that his new house was being built quickly. John was a member of the Stanhope family of Low Hall who had purchased part of Horsforth in 1565. Stanhope's father died in 1693 and as the eldest son he inherited the estate. In 1697 he married Mary Lowther (1627–1729) the daughter of Sir William Lowther of Swillington. The couple chose not to live in Low Hall and built a new house which was started two years after their marriage. The date on the stable block which still exists is 1707. They had six children and when John died in 1736 his eldest son John Stanhope (1702–1769) inherited the house.

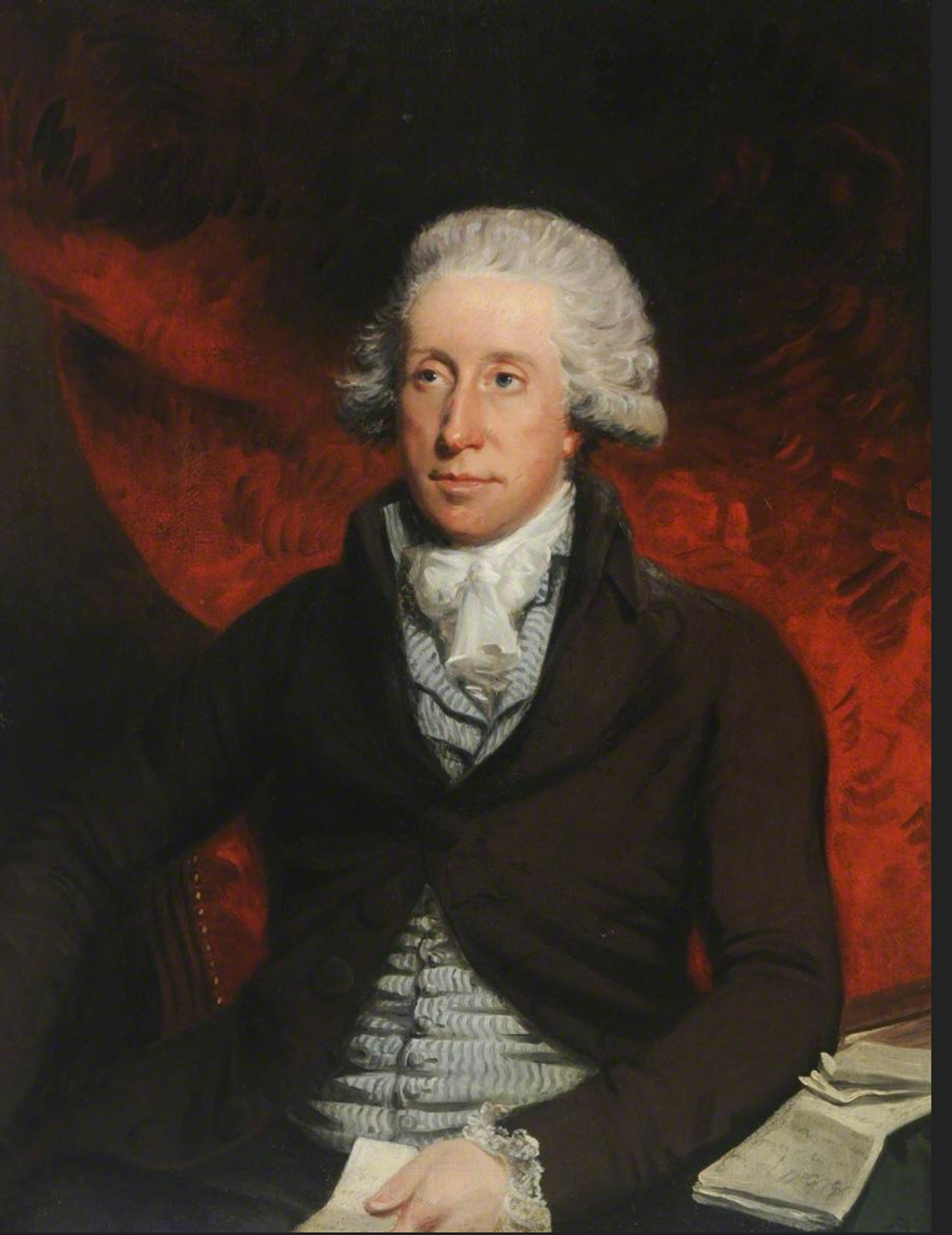
Walter Spencer-Stanhope (1749–1822)

He graduated from University College, Oxford in 1720 and became an attorney. In 1726 he married Barbara Cockcroft, the daughter and heiress of John Cockcroft of Thornton. The couple had no children so when he died in 1769 his nephew Walter Spencer Stanhope inherited the house.

Walter Spencer-Stanhope (1749–1822) was the son of John's younger brother Walter Stanhope (1704–1759) and his wife Ann Spencer (1729–1775). Ann's brother John Spencer (1719–1775) who was a bachelor owned Cannon Hall in Cawthorne. As he had no children, Walter inherited this property when his uncle died in 1775. He studied law at the University of Oxford. In 1783 Walter married Mary Winifred Pulleine (1768–1850) the daughter and heiress of Thomas Babington Pulleine of Carleton Hall in Skipton. The couple had eight sons and seven daughters. He became a member of Parliament in 1775 and was a personal friend of William Wilberforce, the anti-slavery campaigner.

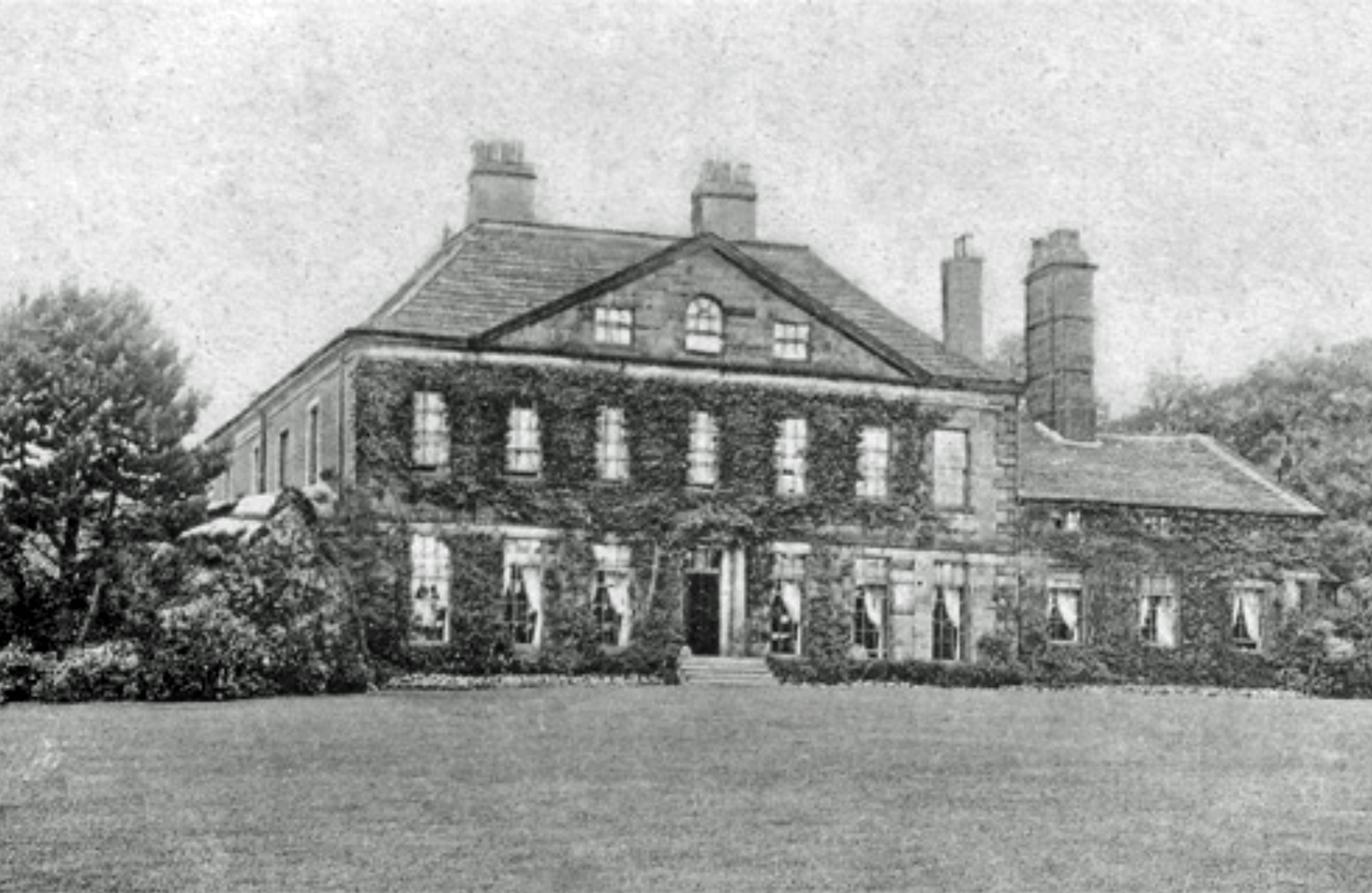
Horsforth Hall, 1901

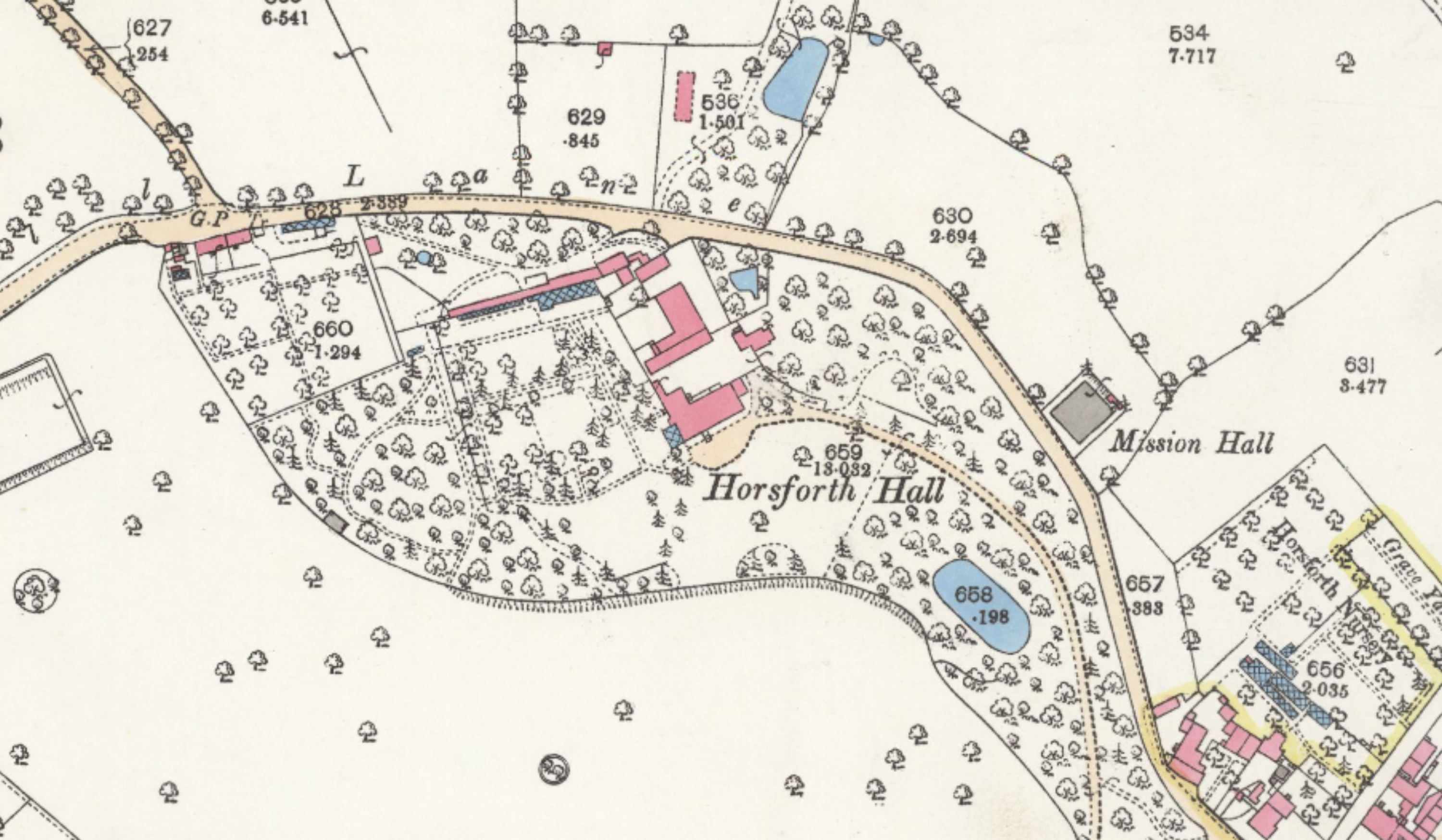
Map Horsforth Hall 1890

After Walter inherited Cannon Hall in 1775 he maintained households in Horsforth and Cannon Hall for many years but eventually moved with his large family to Cannon Hall and let Horsforth Hall.

His first tenant was Lieutenant Colonel Thomas Lloyd (1751–1828) commander of the Leeds Volunteers during hostilities with France in 1801. After the war his officers commissioned a painting by John Russell as a present for his wife. The work is in the National Army Museum.

In 1807 Peter Rhodes (1759–1837) a wealthy merchant from Leeds was the tenant. He and his wife Elizabeth (nee Armitage) lived there for several years until his son Reverend James Armitage Rhodes (1783–1871) moved into the house and Peter moved to Leeds. James had married Mary Turner (1789–1871) the daughter and heiress of Alexander Turner of Mytholm Hall. The couple lived at the hall for more than 30 years until 1843. During this time Walter Spencer Stanhope died and his son John Spencer Stanhope (1787–1873) inherited the estates. He continued to live at Cannon Hall and Horsforth Hall remained a rental property.

The next tenant from 1843 was John Marshall (1796–1870) who was a wealthy business man and member of the Leeds Council. Before he came to Leeds he was the Mayor of Norwich. He lived there until his death in 1870. After that it was rented to Thomas John Kinnear (1830–1913) a woollen manufacturer who lived there until about 1880. During his tenancy John Spencer Stanhope died and his son Walter Thomas William Spencer-Stanhope (1827–1911) became the owner. The hall continued to be rented to wealthy tenants.

From 1880 Sir Surr William Duncan (1834–1908) became the tenant and he lived there for 27 years. He was a widower when he came to Horsforth Hall but in 1896 he married Elizabeth Heaton (1857–1937). After his death in 1908 she lived at the house for several years. In 1911 Walter Thomas William Spencer Stanhope died and his son John Montague Spencer Stanhope (1860–1944) inherited the house. It was let to Alexander Mann Walker (1875–1946) M. B. E. who was a part owner of the blanket mill firm Wormald and Walker in Dewsbury. He and his wife left in the late 1920s and for some time it was untenanted.

=== Creation of park under public ownership ===
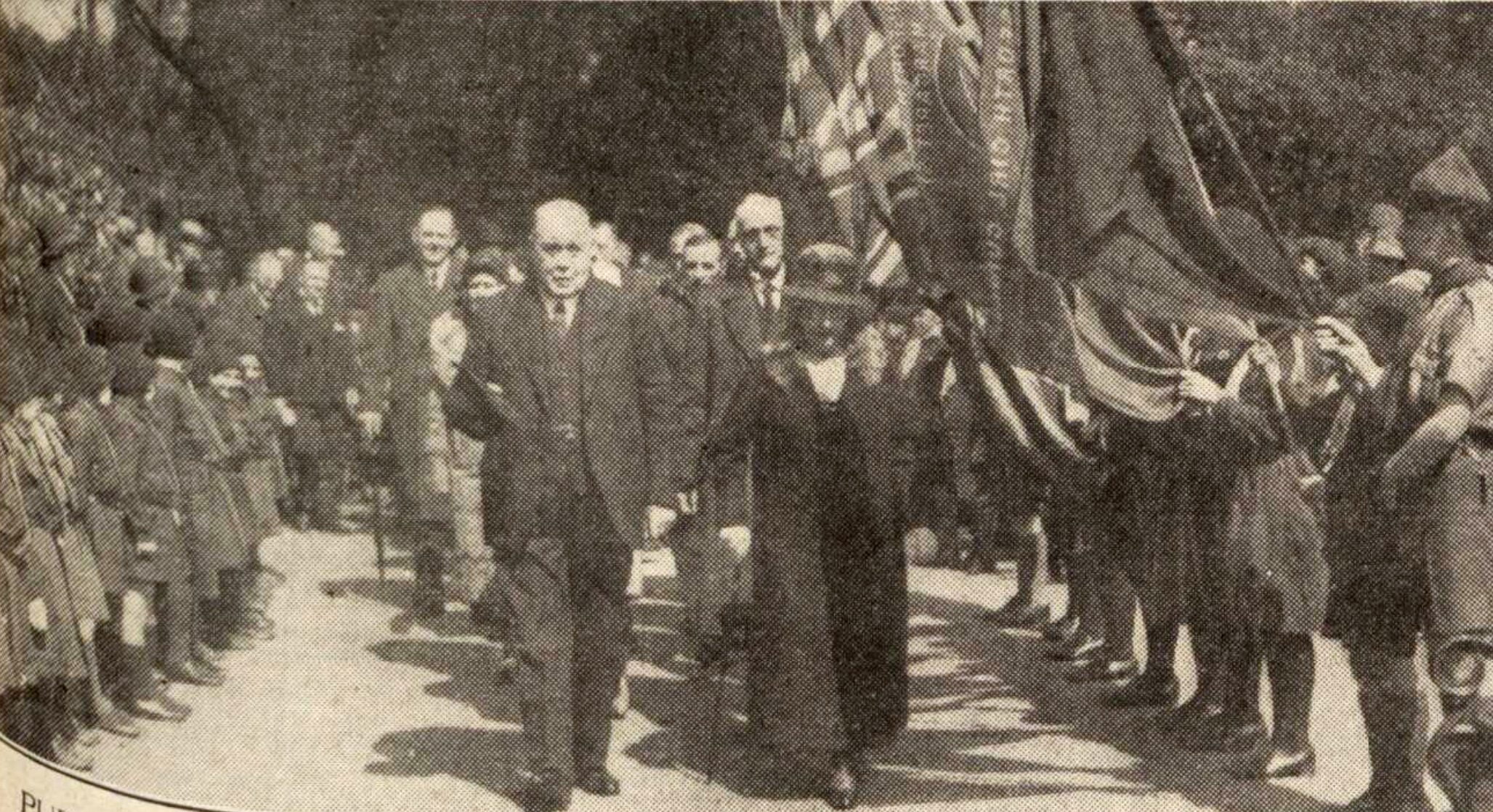
William Mathieson and his wife Margaret opening Horsforth Hall Park in 1932

In 1930 William Mathieson (1852–1943) who had lived in Horsforth for over 40 years offered to buy the hall from the Stanhope family and to donate it to the council. On 24 February 1930 the council accepted his offer. William was born in 1852 in Larbert, Scotland. In 1874 he married Margaret Bryden Spence (1856–1943) who was the daughter of Robert Spence a Glasgow, engineer. William's family owned a factory in Larbert making iron goods such as stoves and gas fires. In 1888 he moved to Leeds to set up a similar factory called Wilsons and Mathiesons in Forge Lane Armley. The firm was successful and he became extremely wealthy. He lived in a house called "Glenburn" which is in Calverley Lane in Horsforth.

After an extensive lay-out scheme was completed and many recreational facilities the park was opened by Mr and Mrs Mathieson in 1932. The hall was used as offices by the council for many years. However by 1953 it had become structurally unsound and was demolished.

== See also ==
- Listed buildings in Horsforth
