= Hardisty (surname) =

Hardisty is a surname. Notable people with the surname include:

- Alan Hardisty (born 1941), British rugby league footballer
- Bob Hardisty (1921–1986), British footballer
- Charles Hardisty (1885–1968), British cricketer
- Dorothy Hardisty (1881–1973), English champion of refugee children
- Huntington Hardisty (1929–2003), American admiral
- Jean Hardisty (1945–2015), American political scientist
- Richard Hardisty (1831–1889), Canadian politician
- Sarah Hardisty (1924–2014), Dene elder and quillworker

== See also ==
- Hardisty family, Canadian family of British heritage
