= Horsforth School =

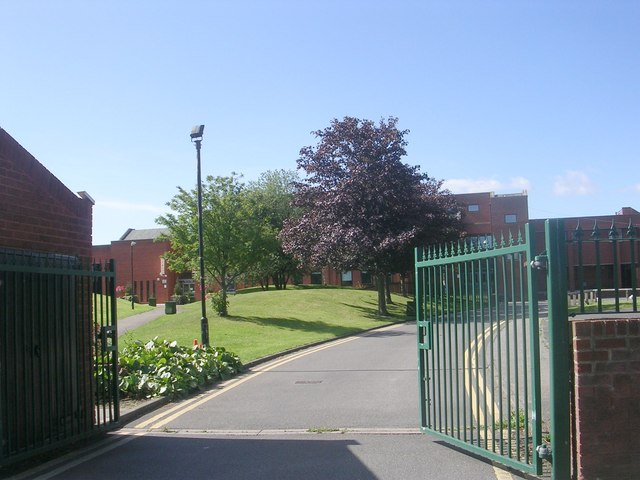
- Entrance from Lee Lane

Location
- Lee Lane East; Horsforth; Leeds, West Yorkshire, LS18 5RF; England; 53.84236°N 1.64078°W

Information
- Type: Academy
- Motto: Opportunity and Achievement for All
- Established: 1972
- Local authority: City of Leeds
- Specialist: Science College
- Department for Education URN: 137775 Tables
- Ofsted: Reports
- Headteacher: Paul Bell
- Gender: Mixed
- Age: 11 to 18
- Enrolment: 1500
- Colours: Purple, Green, black and white
- Facebook: facebook.com/HorsforthSchool
- Website: http://www.horsforthschool.org/

Horsforth School is a science specialist secondary school with academy status in Leeds, West Yorkshire, England.

Opened in 1972 and located in Horsforth, it educates around 1,500 boys and girls, aged 11 to 18. It gained Special Science status in 2002. In 2012 75% of students received 5 A*-C GCSEs including English and Maths. Horsforth School also includes a post 16 centre. The school has been awarded the school curriculum award, and has Artsmark and Sportsmark status.

The school won the United Kingdom Aerospace Youth Rocketry Challenge in 2008 and entered two teams into the 2009 competition. It won the competition again in 2010, becoming the only school ever to win twice. The school faced criticism in 2015 for planning an optional sports trip to Barbados for pupils in years 8, 9 and 10, costing £1,650 per pupil. The school is very big on music as they host many shows throughout the year.

== Notable alumni ==
- Tonicha Jeronimo, actor
- James Milner, England international footballer
