= Listed buildings in Horsforth =

Horsforth is a civil parish and a ward in the metropolitan borough of the City of Leeds, West Yorkshire, England. The parish and ward contain 44 listed buildings that are recorded in the National Heritage List for England. Of these, one is listed at Grade II*, the middle of the three grades, and the others are at Grade II, the lowest grade. The parish and ward contain the town of Horsforth and the surrounding area. Most of the listed buildings are houses and associated structures, farmhouses and farm buildings. The other listed buildings include churches and Sunday schools, bridges and a toll house, a weir and retaining walls, a milepost, a former corn mill, a former mechanics' institute, two war memorials, and a telephone kiosk.

== Key ==
Grade	Criteria
II*	Particularly important buildings of more than special interest
II	Buildings of national importance and special interest

== Buildings ==
Name and location	Photograph	Date	Notes	Grade
New Laithes Manor House; 53.82776°N 1.64383°W	—	Late 16th century (possible)	A manor house that was later extended and remodelled, it is in sandstone with quoins, and a roof partly in stone slate and partly in slate. There are two storeys, a main range with four bays and an aisle, a one-bay cottage on the left, and a projecting one-bay wing on the east. The projecting wing has a timber framed core that was later encased in stone. The main range has a stuccoed front, and contains a Tudor arched doorway with a moulded cornice, and sash windows. The east gable of this range has exposed timber framing. The projecting wing has mullioned windows.	II
5, 6 and 7 Troy Hill; 53.84606°N 1.63106°W	—	Early 17th century	A house, later divided into three, it is in sandstone, and has a two-span stone slate roof with moulded gable copings. There are two storeys, and three bays. On the east front is a doorway with a moulded surround converted into a window, flanked by two inserted doorways, and a continuous hood mould. The windows are mullioned or mullioned and transomed.	II
Barn southwest of Low Hall Farmhouse; 53.83306°N 1.66380°W		Early 17th century (probable)	The barn is in sandstone with quoins, and a stone slate roof with moulded gable copings. There are four bays and aisles on both sides. The barn contains opposing wagon entrances, one with an altered lintel, the other with a chamfered segmental arch, a blocked doorway, and a doorway converted into a window. In the south gable end are vents.	II
Clapper bridge 53.84428°N 1.62865°W		Mid 17th century	The clapper bridge carries a footpath over a stream. It is in gritstone, and consists of eight stone slabs on two piers that are curved on the north side.	II
Ling Bob Farmhouse; 53.85353°N 1.63513°W	—	17th century	A farmhouse that has been altered, and later a private house, it is in sandstone with quoins, and a stone slate roof with coped gables and kneelers. There are two storeys and two bays. The openings have plain surrounds, and most of the windows are paired with mullions. There is an added bay window in the right return.	II
Low Fold; 53.83348°N 1.64875°W		17th century	A farmhouse, later extended and divided, it is in sandstone on a chamfered plinth, with quoins, and a stone slate roof, hipped at the angle. There are two storeys, and an L-shaped plan consisting of a range of three bays and an extension to the west. Most of the windows are mullioned, with some mullions removed, some have hood moulds, and on the front is a small sundial.	II
Low Hall; 53.83313°N 1.66331°W		17th century	A manor house and farmhouse, later altered and used for various purposes. It is in sandstone, with quoins, and stone slate roofs with coped gables, kneelers and finials. There is an irregular U-shaped plan, with a main range of two storeys and six bays, a large wing at the rear, and a smaller wing to the west. On the front of the main range is a canted two-storey porch containing a doorway with a moulded surround and a four-light fanlight, above which is a mullioned and transomed window. The rear wing has three storeys and four bays. The windows in the building vary, some with mullions and/or transoms, and some are cross windows, and some of the doorways have Tudor arches.	II
Brookfoot House and Pear Tree Cottage; 53.84397°N 1.62937°W		Late 17th century	A house that was remodelled in the 18th century, later divided, and cottages added in the 18th century. The building is in sandstone on a chamfered plinth, with quoins, and stone slate roofs with coped gables and moulded kneelers. There are two storeys, and the house has three bays. The windows are mullioned with casements. The cottages are recessed to the left, they are lower, with two bays, and most of the windows are sliding sashes.	II
Former farmhouse north-east of Ling Bob Farmhouse; 53.85369°N 1.63483°W	—	Late 17th century	The farmhouse, later used for other purposes, is in sandstone with a continuous hood mould, and a stone slate roof with coped gables and moulded kneelers. There are two storeys and a continuous rear outshut. The openings include mullioned windows, with some mullions missing.	II
Owlet Grange; 53.85794°N 1.63811°W	—	Late 17th century	The farmhouse, which was later extended and divided, is in sandstone with quoins, moulded gutter brackets, and a stone slate roof with coped gables and kneelers. There are two storeys, and a symmetrical front of five bays. The central doorway has a plain surround, and the windows are sashes.	II
Station House; 53.84728°N 1.63059°W		Late 17th century	A farmhouse, barn and cottage, later all in residential use, the earliest part is the barn, with the house and cottage added in the 18th century. The whole building is in sandstone with quoins and roofs of slate and stone slate. From the left, the former barn has one storey, three bays and a rear outshut. The former cottage to the right has two storeys and two bays, and the former farmhouse further to the right has three storeys and two bays. Most of the windows are sashes, some sliding.	II
Barn and cottage north of Woodbottom Cottage; 53.83339°N 1.66411°W		Late 17th century	The barn and attached workshop or former cottage were extended in the 19th century. The building is in gritstone, and has a stone slate roof with coped gables. The barn has quoins and five bays. It contains a cart entry with chamfered jambs, a doorway and window, both with Tudor arched heads, and a pitching hole. The other part is recessed, and contains two doorways, one with a Tudor arched head, and windows, including a sliding sash window.	II
Stables and barn, Ling Bob Farmhouse; 53.85378°N 1.63527°W	—	1680	The stable and barn are in sandstone, with quoins and a slate roof. The barn has four bays and an aisle, and contains a segmental-headed wagon entry with a chamfered surround, two square windows, a square pitching hole, and a Tudor arched doorway with a chamfered surround and a dated and initialled lintel. The stable range has a stable door and square openings.	II
Weir and retaining walls 53.82830°N 1.63796°W		1690	The weir on the River Aire and the retaining walls are in gritstone. The weir is about 50 metres (160 ft) long, and the retaining walls are on the north side of the river. The weir collapsed in February 2021.	II
123–135 Town Street; 53.84040°N 1.63712°W		18th century	A row of seven cottages converted from a farmhouse and outbuildings, it is in sandstone, with quoins, and a stone slate roof. The row contains the remains of the former farm openings, including a circular window.	II
Milepost; 53.84948°N 1.65713°W	—	18th century	The milepost is in a garden by the junction of Layton Road and Bayton Lane. It is in sandstone, and consists of a square post about 1 metre (3 ft 3 in) high. Inscribed on the stone are pointed hands and the distances to Bradford, Horsforth, Otley, and Leeds.	II
4 Hall Lane; 53.83713°N 1.64391°W		Mid to late 18th century	A farmhouse, later a private house, it is in sandstone, with quoins, and a stone slate roof with coped gables. There are two storeys, a double-depth plan, and two bays. The doorway has a plain surround, and the windows are mullioned with three lights.	II
55 and 57 Long Row; 53.84393°N 1.63412°W	—	Mid to late 18th century	A pair of sandstone cottages with quoins, a floor band, and a stone slate roof with a coped gable. There are two storeys, a double-depth plan, and two bays. The doorways in the centre have plain surrounds, and the windows are mullioned, with two or three lights.	II
Croft House; 53.84126°N 1.63626°W		Mid to late 18th century	The house, which was later extended to the left, is in sandstone with quoins, a band, and a stone slate roof. There are two storeys and three bays. On the front are two doorways, the left one with a swept canopy. Above the left doorway is an oeil-de-boeuf window, and the other windows are paired sashes.	II
Lee Lane Farmhouse; 53.84668°N 1.64621°W		Mid to late 18th century	A cottage was later added to the right of the farmhouse. The building is in sandstone, with quoins, and a stone slate roof with coped gables and kneelers. There are two storeys, the house has two bays and a rear outshut, and the cottage has one bay. Most of the windows are mullioned.	II
Springfield Farmhouse; 53.84330°N 1.65636°W		Mid to late 18th century	The farmhouse is in sandstone, with quoins, and a stone slate roof with coped gables. There are two storeys and an attic, a double-depth plan, and a symmetrical front of three bays. The central doorway has a plain surround, above it is a single-light window, and the other windows are mullioned with two lights. In the gable ends are windows, the window in the right gable with a Diocletian surround, and at the rear is a three-stage mullioned stair window.	II
Grove Manse; 53.83712°N 1.64142°W		1772	The manse is in sandstone, with rusticated quoins, a band, a moulded gutter cornice, and a tiled roof with coped gables and kneelers. There are two storeys and a symmetrical front of five bays. The central doorway has a moulded architrave, and a moulded cornice on scrolled consoles. The windows are sashes, the window above the doorway with a moulded sill and architrave.	II
Former Corn Mill; 53.83581°N 1.61728°W	—	1772–87	A water-powered corn mill converted for other uses, it is in sandstone with quoins, and stone slate roofs. There are two linked blocks at right angles, one with three storeys and three bays, and the other with two storeys and three bays. The south, lower, block contains a central segmental-arched cart entrance, with two loading doors above.	II
6 Hall Lane; 53.83704°N 1.64420°W		Late 18th century (probable)	A small house in sandstone, with quoins, and a stone slate roof with coped gables. There are two storeys, a double-depth plan, and a symmetrical front of two bays. The central doorway has a plain surround, and the windows are mullioned with three lights.	II
2, 6 and 8 Long Row; 53.84159°N 1.63547°W	—	Late 18th century	A row of two, later three houses, in sandstone, with quoins, a gutter on moulded brackets, and a stone slate roof. There are two storeys, a double-depth plan, and six bays. On the front is a later gabled porch, and the windows are sashes, above the doorway they have a single light, and the others have three lights with mullions.	II
79, 81 and 83 Town Street; 53.83863°N 1.63965°W		Late 18th century	A row of three sandstone cottages with a stone slate roof. There are two storeys, a double-depth plan, and four bays. The doorways have plain surrounds, and the windows are paired four-pane sashes with mullions.	II
Stable block, former Horsforth Hall; 53.83852°N 1.64733°W		Late 18th century	The stable block, now in Horsforth Hall Park and used for other purposes, is in sandstone on a plinth, with a hipped stone slate roof. There are two storeys and eight bays. The openings have plain surrounds, and include doorways, square windows, one with a cornice, and a loading door converted into a window. On the front is a square sundial, and in the right end is a re-set datestone.	II
Owlet Farmhouse; 53.85844°N 1.63757°W	—	Late 18th century (probable)	The farmhouse, later divided, is in sandstone with quoins, and a stone slate roof with coped gables and kneelers. There are two storeys and three bays. The windows have three lights with mullions, the middle light a sash, and to the right of the doorway is a circular window.	II
Moss House; 53.85601°N 1.64347°W	—	1782	A house, later extended and used as a farmhouse, it is in sandstone with quoins, a sill band, moulded gutter brackets, and a stone slate roof with a coped gable on the right. There are two storeys, a double-depth plan, five bays, and a rear single-storey service wing. The second bay has a pediment containing an oculus. The doorway has pilaster jambs, a fanlight, and a canopy on carved brackets. In the ground floor are three French windows, some of the other windows are sashes, and others are mullioned.	II
Beech House; 53.85410°N 1.63634°W	—	c. 1800	A house incorporating part of an earlier farmhouse on the left with a 20th-century extension on the right. It is in stone with a moulded string course, a moulded cornice, a low parapet, and a stone slate roof. There are two storeys, the main part has four bays, and the earlier part is lower with two storeys and one bay. The doorway has a fanlight, and a canopy on scrolled brackets. In the ground floor are French windows, and the upper floor windows are sashes, all with moulded surrounds. In the earlier part is a doorway and mullioned windows.	II
Newlay Bridge; 53.82822°N 1.63874°W		1819	The bridge crossing the River Aire is in cast and wrought iron, and has sandstone abutments. It consists of a single segmental span with a low parapet of panelled iron with railings, and on the sides are inscribed panels. The deck is paved with setts, and the pavements are in tarmac.	II*
Toll House; 53.82839°N 1.63884°W		1819 (probable)	The toll house to Newlay Bridge is in sandstone, with sill bands, and a hipped slate roof. There are two storeys and an L-shaped plan, with two bays on each front. On the front facing the road is a doorway converted into a window, a tripartite window to the left, and two Venetian windows in the upper floor. In the left return is a central doorway, and windows with altered glazing; all the openings have plain surrounds.	II
Baptist church and cottage 53.83359°N 1.63528°W		Early 19th century	The chapel and attached cottage are in sandstone with quoins and stone slate roofs. The chapel has two storeys and four bays. In the south front is a doorway flanked by square windows, and four round-headed windows above. The cottage is attached to the west end, it has three storeys, a three-bay gabled front, a central doorway, and windows with plain surrounds. On the left return is a cantilevered flight of external steps with iron railings.	II
Woodside Methodist Sunday School and Hall; 53.83439°N 1.62035°W		Early 19th century	The school was built first, facing the road, and the chapel was added in 1839, at right angles to the north. They are in sandstone, with hipped roofs of slate and stone slate. The school has one storey and a symmetrical front of five bays. In the centre is a doorway, and the windows have round heads, imposts, and keystones. The chapel, later a meeting room, has similar windows and an inscribed and dated plaque with a scrolled surround.	II
Upper Bank House; 53.83613°N 1.64229°W	—	c. 1838	A house, later an office, in sandstone with a sill band, a moulded cornice, a low parapet, and a hipped slate roof. There are two storeys, a double-depth plan, a symmetrical front of five bays, and a single-storey two-bay right wing. In the centre is a projecting Ionic porch, and the windows are sashes. The left return contains a canted bay window.	II
St James' Church; 53.84062°N 1.62550°W		1847–48	The south aisle was added in 1904. The church is built in sandstone with a slate roof, and is in Early English style. It consists of a nave, north and south aisles, north and south porches, and a chancel. At the west end is a doorway with a moulded surround and a hood mould, above it is a four-light window, and on the gable is a bellcote.	II
Baptist Sunday School and house 53.83357°N 1.63579°W		1864	The Sunday school, later a church, and the attached house are in sandstone with slate roofs. The Sunday school has one storey, one bay at the front, and six on the sides. On the front is a round-headed doorway with a fanlight and an inscribed stone above, and along the sides are round-headed windows. The house has two storeys and two bays, and a single-story two-bay extension to the left. On the front is a recessed doorway with a surround of rusticated long and short quoins. The windows on the side have round heads, and on the front they are sashes with segmental heads.	II
Grove Methodist Church; 53.83698°N 1.64113°W		1867	The church is in sandstone with a Welsh slate roof. It consists of a nave, transepts, a chancel, and a porch treated as a tower. This has an elongated hexagonal plan, two arched doorways, above which is a gable containing a medallion. Over this is a steeply pitched saddleback roof with ornamental wrought iron cresting.	II
St Margaret's Church; 53.84015°N 1.64265°W		1867–83	The church was designed by J. Loughborough Pearson in Early English style, and the spire was completed in 1901. It is built in gritstone with a slate roof, and consists of a nave with a clerestory, north and south aisles, north and south porches, a north transept, a chancel, and a southeast steeple. The steeple has a three-stage tower with a southeast stair turret, and a broach spire with three tiers of lucarnes. At the west end are angle buttresses rising to octagonal turrets with pinnacles.	II
Mechanics Institution; 53.83997°N 1.63782°W		1881	The Mechanics Institute, later used for other purposes, is in sandstone with a floor band, a moulded cornice, and a slate roof. There are two storeys and cellars, and a symmetrical front of three bays. The middle bay projects and contains a porch with pilasters, and a doorway with a moulded surround, over which is a lettered and dated panel with a pediment. The bay is carried up as an oriel window with corbelled sides, a large round-headed sash window with a moulded architrave, and curved side windows, over which is a swag and a pediment. In the outer bays are cellar windows, tripartite sash windows with cornices in the ground floor, and sash windows in the upper floor with architraves and pediments.	II
St Gabriels House; 53.85198°N 1.64044°W	—	1890	The house is in gritstone on a chamfered plinth, with a sill band, an eaves band, and a tile roof. There are two storeys and attics, and an L-shaped plan. On the garden front is a square two-storey bay window, and on the rear front are two gabled projections and a tall staircase window. Projecting from this front is a single-storey wing surmounted by a wooden cupola with a lead ogee roof, behind which is a high embattled projection. Steps lead up to a doorway that has a moulded surround and an inscribed lintel. The windows vary, some with mullions and transoms.	II
War Memorial at the junction with Fink Hill; 53.83461°N 1.64572°W		1920	The war memorial stands in an enclosed garden by a road junction. It is in stone, and consists of a cenotaph erected following the First World War, and a lectern added in 1947. The cenotaph is on a base of three steps, and has a moulded plinth. At the top is a moulded cornice on which are three chamfered steps, and a central block with a wreath, flanked by Ionic columns, and surmounted by three steps. On three faces are inset inscribed bronze plaques. The lectern stands in front, and has a bronze plaque. The garden is enclosed by a low stone wall with iron piers and chains, and a gateway with an overthrow.	II
Horsforth War Memorial; 53.83767°N 1.63237°W		1929	The war memorial is in an avenue of trees, and consists of a monolith of grey stone about 2 metres (6 ft 7 in) high. It stands on a brick platform that also contains flower beds. On the front of the stone is an inscribed plaque.	II
Telephone kiosk 53.83677°N 1.64276°W		1935	The telephone kiosk is outside Old Kings Arms Public House, and is of the K6 type, designed by Giles Gilbert Scott. Constructed in cast iron with a square plan and a dome, it has unperforated crowns in the top panels.	II
