= Grove Methodist Church =

Church in Leeds, England

Coordinates: 53.837°N 1.641°W

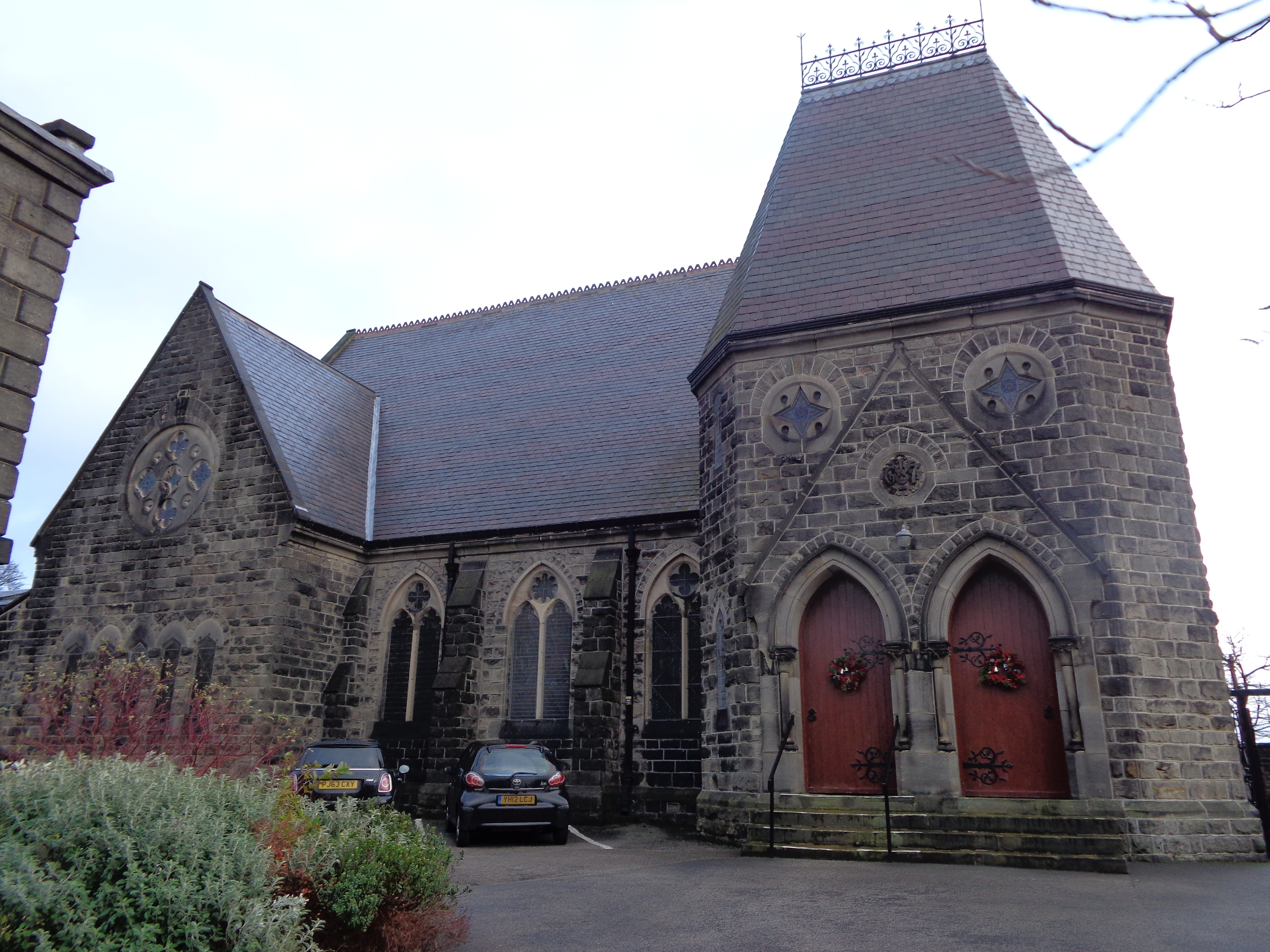
Grove Methodist Church in 2013

The Grove Methodist Church is a Grade II listed Methodist church in the village of Horsforth, Leeds, England, part of the Leeds South and West Methodist Circuit.

The predecessor of the present church, which opened on 11 May 1796, was on New Street opposite the present church.
