= Hardesty =

Hardesty may refer to:

== People ==
- Bob Hardesty (1931–2013), American educator
- Brandon Hardesty (born 1987), American comedic performer and actor
- David C. Hardesty Jr. (born 1946), American lawyer and educator, former president of West Virginia University
- Gwynneth Coogan (born 1965), née Hardesty, American long-distance runner
- Herbert Hardesty (1925–2016), American saxophone and trumpet player
- James Hardesty (born 1948), chief justice of the Nevada Supreme Court
- Jo Ann Hardesty (born 1957), Portland City Commissioner
- Montario Hardesty (born 1987), American college football coach and former National Football League player
- Paul Hardesty (born 1963), American lobbyist and politician
- Reina Hardesty, 21st century American actress
- Scott Hardesty (1870–1944), American Major League Baseball player
- Shortridge Hardesty, a former partner in Hardesty & Hanover, an American infrastructure engineering company
- Sue Hardesty (1933–2022), American author

== Places in the United States ==
- Queen Anne, Prince George's County, Maryland, formerly a town renamed Hardesty, now a census-designated place
- Hardesty, Oklahoma, a town
- Hardesty Federal Complex, Kansas City, Missouri

== Other uses ==
- Sally Hardesty, a fictional character in the Texas Chainsaw Massacre franchise
- Hardesty Public School District, Hardesty, Oklahoma, which includes Hardesty High School and Hardesty Elementary School

== See also ==
- Hardesty's Historical and Geographical Encyclopedia, a 19th century American encyclopedia published by H. H. Hardesty & Company
- Hardisty (disambiguation)
