= Stanley Metcalfe =

English cricketer

Personal information
- Full name: Stanley Gordon Metcalfe
- Born: 20 June 1932; Horsforth, Yorkshire, England
- Died: 16 September 2017 (aged 85); Alton, Hampshire, England
- Batting: Right-handed
- Bowling: Right-arm off break

Domestic team information
- Years: Team
- 1954–1956: Oxford University
- 1961: Marylebone Cricket Club

Career statistics
Competition	First-class
Matches	27
Runs scored	1,200
Batting average	25.53
100s/50s	2/6
Top score	133*
Balls bowled	668
Wickets	9
Bowling average	39.11
5 wickets in innings	–
10 wickets in match	–
Best bowling	2/32
Catches/stumpings	11/–
- Source: Cricinfo, 4 June 2019

Stanley Gordon Metcalfe (20 June 1932 – 16 September 2017) was an English first-class cricketer. He played first-class cricket on 27 occasions, mostly for Oxford University and the Free Foresters.

== Life and first-class cricket ==
Metcalfe was born at Horsforth in June 1932 and attended the nearby Leeds Grammar School. From there he went up to Pembroke College, Oxford. While at Oxford he made his debut in first-class cricket for Oxford University against Gloucestershire in 1954 at Oxford. He played first-class cricket for Oxford until 1956, making seventeen appearances. He scored 595 runs in his seventeen matches, an average of 20.51 and a high score of 75. He first played for the Free Foresters in 1958, playing in seven first-class matches for them between 1958–68. It was for the Free Foresters that he made his highest first-class score, with 133 not out against Oxford University in 1959, one of two centuries he made and 543 runs he scored for the Free Foresters. Metcalfe also appeared in one first-class match for the Marylebone Cricket Club against Cambridge University at Lord's in 1961, as well as two matches for D. R. Jardine's XI in 1958.

After graduating from Oxford, he worked for Rank Hovis McDougall from 1959, later becoming their chairman. He lived out his final years in Alton, Hampshire, before dying in September 2017 following a long illness.
