= Frank Kershaw =

English cricketer

Personal information
- Full name: Frank Kershaw
- Born: 11 December 1879; Horsforth, Yorkshire, England
- Died: 5 May 1959 (aged 79); Frinton-on-Sea, Essex, England
- Batting: Unknown
- Bowling: Unknown

Career statistics
Competition	First-class
Matches	2
Runs scored	43
Batting average	14.33
100s/50s	–/–
Top score	36
Balls bowled	42
Wickets	0
Bowling average	–
5 wickets in innings	–
10 wickets in match	–
Best bowling	–
Catches/stumpings	1/–
- Source: Cricinfo, 26 July 2019

Frank Kershaw (11 December 1879 – 5 May 1959) was an English first-class cricketer.

Kershaw was born at Horsforth in December 1879. He was educated at Cheltenham College, before going up to Trinity College, Oxford. He later toured British India with the Oxford University Authentics in 1902–03, making two first-class appearances on the tour against Bombay and the Parsees. He scored 43 runs in his two first-class matches, with a high score of 36. He died at Frinton-on-Sea in May 1959.
