= Charles Hardisty =

English cricketer (1885–1968)

Charles Henry Hardisty (10 December 1885 – 2 March 1968) was an English first-class cricketer, who played thirty eight matches for Yorkshire County Cricket Club between 1906 and 1909, and a first-class match for J Bamford's XI in 1908. He also appeared for the Yorkshire Second XI from 1906 to 1910, H Hayley's XI in 1906 and Northumberland in 1911.

Born in Horsforth, Leeds, Yorkshire, England, Hardisty was a right-handed batsman, who scored 998 runs at 19.19, with a best of 84 against Leicestershire. He also scored 74 against the Australian tourists. He made five fifties in all, and took 20 catches.

He joined Horsforth Hall Park when a boy and played for Leeds from 1906 to 1910. In 1911, he joined the Northumberland club, Jesmond C.C., and spent over 12 years in the North-East, including spells at Consett, Wallsend and Ryton-on-Tyne. He was the professional at Wallsend C.C. in 1921, and returned to Yorkshire to captain Horsforth C.C., also assisting Leeds and Keighley.

Hardisty died in March 1968 in Leeds.
