= David Oxtoby (artist) =

British painter (born 1938)

David Jowett Greaves Oxtoby (born 23 January 1938 in Horsforth), is an artist associated with the Pop Art Movement.

Oxtoby studied at Bradford College from 1950 to 1957, and at the Royal Academy Schools from 1960 to 1964. He taught at the Minneapolis Institute of Arts from 1964 to 1965, and subsequently at Maidstone College of Art. in 1978 a book of his work "Oxtoby's Rockers", with text by David Sandison was published by Phaidon Press.

He has said of his work painting images of popstars and pop music: "I started working on musical subject matter while studying graphics at Bradford College of Art during the fifties, completing three or more self-imposed record covers a day. These were actually small paintings (a fact I didn’t realize for many years) with lettering typeset in the Print Department and shoved on as an afterthought." Much of his work of the 1960s was lost in a warehouse fire. in the 1980s Oxtoby gave up exhibiting so as to devote himself to a series of large paintings on rock music.

== Collections ==
Oxtoby's work is in the collections of both the Victoria and Albert Museum the National Portrait Gallery, London, Sheffield Art Gallery and other galleries in the UK and abroad.
