= Horsforth =

Town and civil parish in West Yorkshire, England

Coordinates: 53.837°N 1.643°W

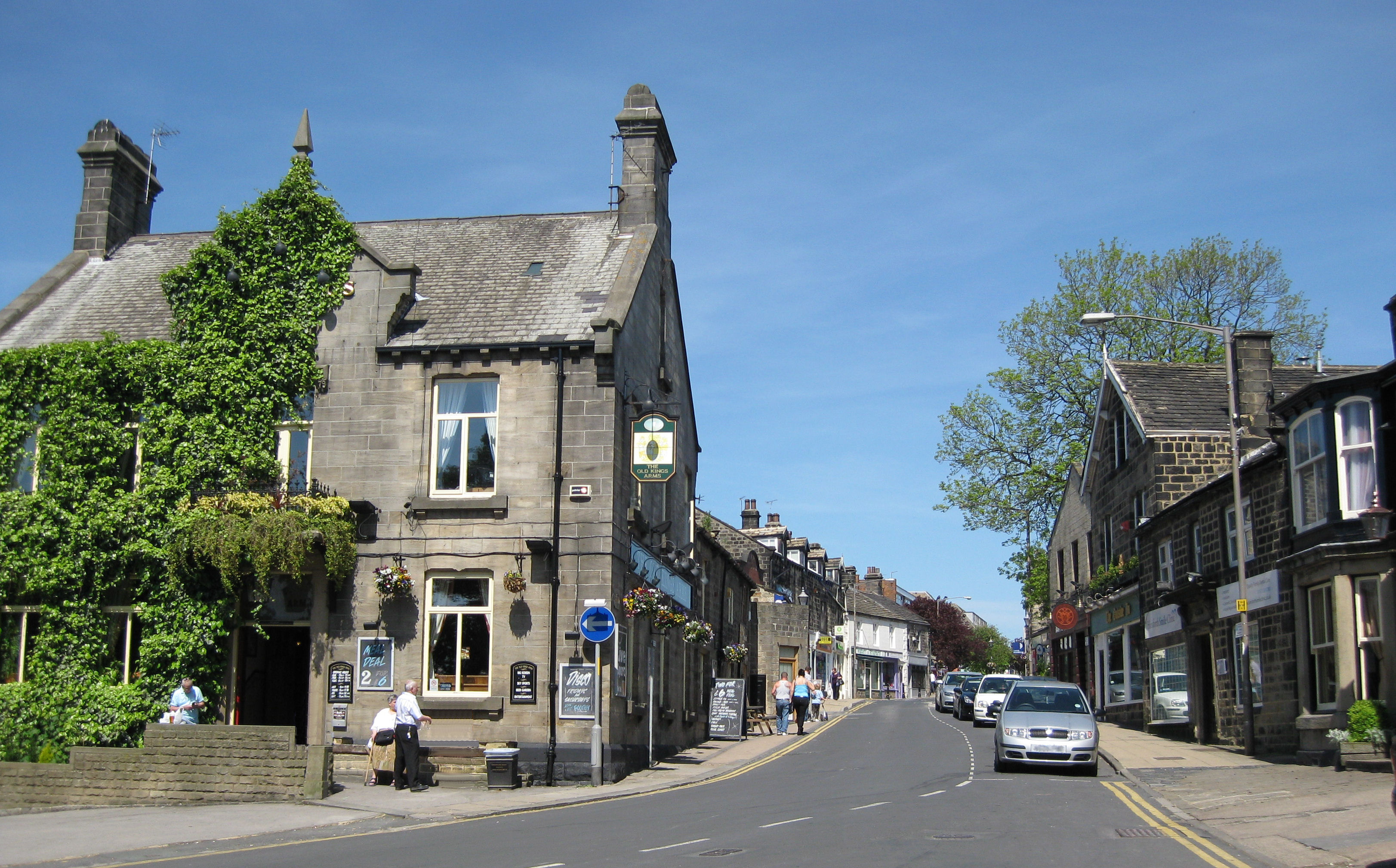
- Town Street, Horsforth

- Location within West Yorkshire
- Population: 18,895 (2011 Census)
- OS grid reference: SE236376
- Civil parish: Horsforth
- Metropolitan borough: City of Leeds
- Metropolitan county: West Yorkshire
- Region: Yorkshire and the Humber
- Country: England
- Sovereign state: United Kingdom
- Post town: LEEDS
- Postcode district: LS18
- Dialling code: 0113
- Police: West Yorkshire
- Fire: West Yorkshire
- Ambulance: Yorkshire
- UK Parliament: Leeds North West
- Website: horsforthtowncouncil.gov.uk

Horsforth is a town and civil parish in the City of Leeds, West Yorkshire, England, five miles north-west of Leeds city centre. Historically a village within the West Riding of Yorkshire, it had a population of 18,895 at the 2011 Census. It became part of the City of Leeds metropolitan borough in 1974. In 1999, a civil parish was created for the area, and the parish council voted to rename itself a town council. The area is within the Horsforth ward of Leeds City Council, which also includes the southern part of Rawdon.

== History ==
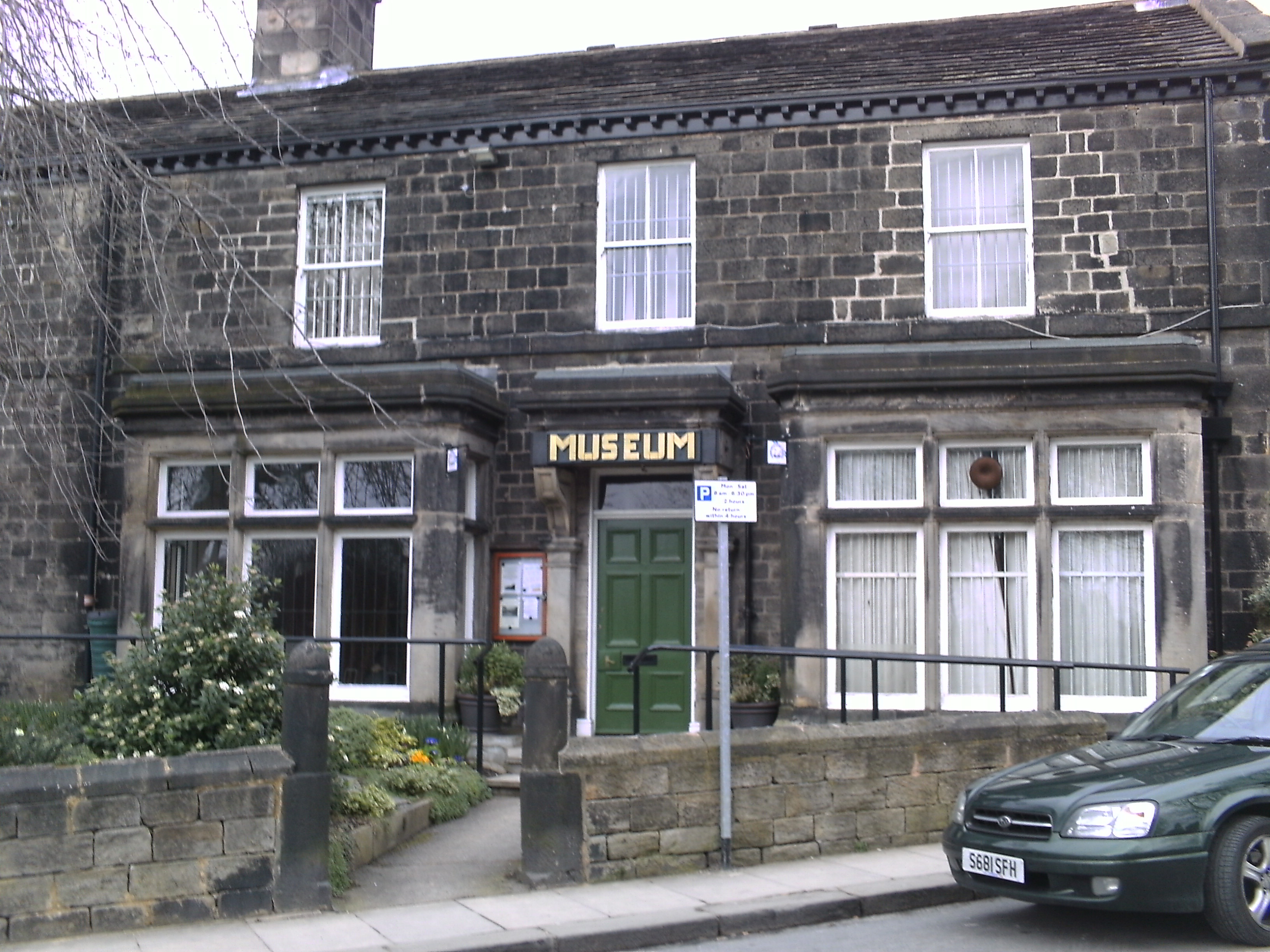
Horsforth Museum

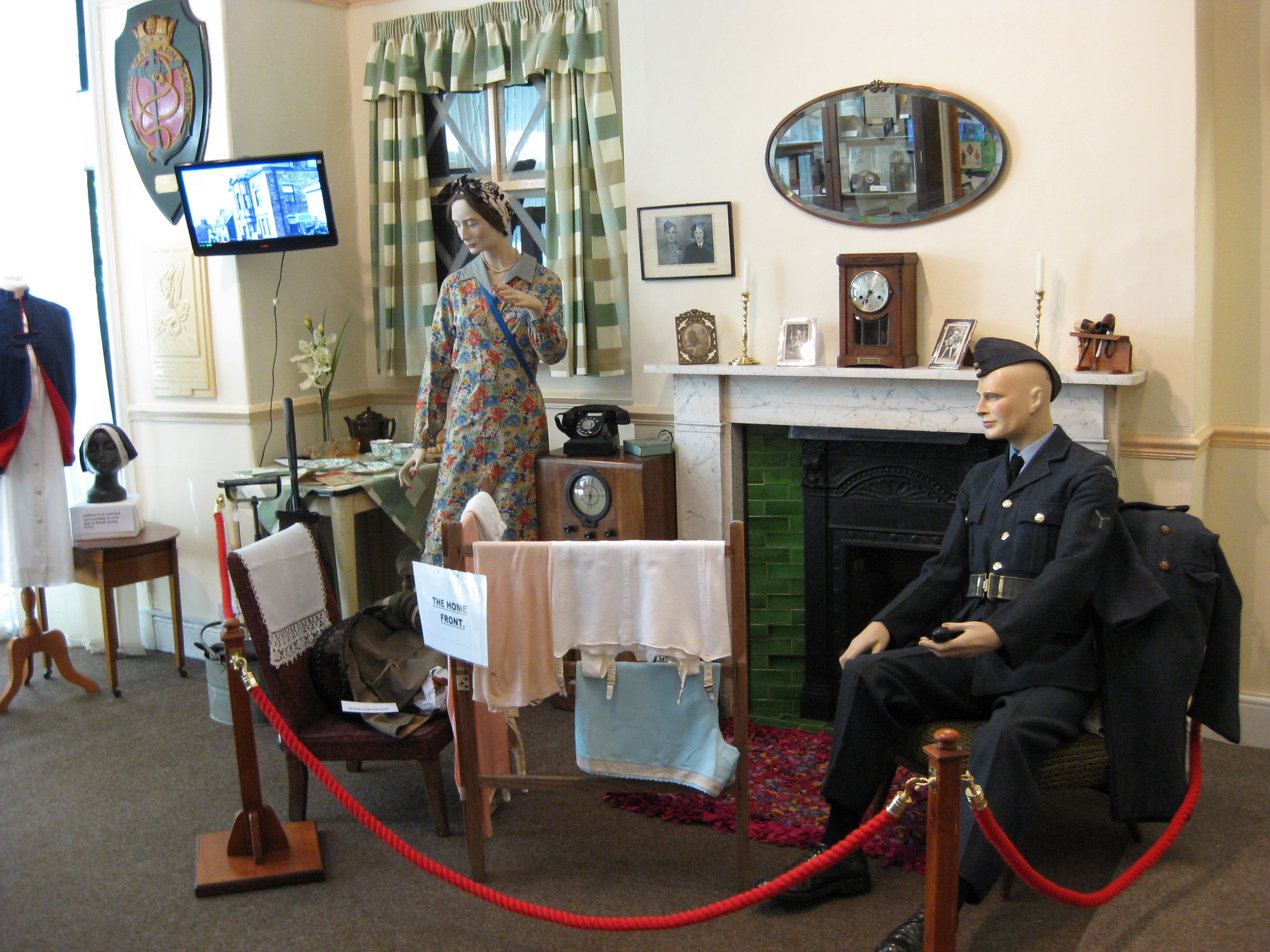
The Home Front: Second World War display in Horsforth Museum

Horsforth was recorded in the Domesday Book of 1086 as Horseford, Horseforde, Hoseforde; but late-ninth-century coins with the legend ORSNA FORD and OHSNA FORD may have come from Horsforth. The name derives from Old English hors or, to judge from the coins, *horsa ('horse') in the genitive plural form horsa/horsna + ford 'ford', thus meaning 'horses' ford'. This refers to a river crossing on the River Aire (possibly at Newlay), that was subsequently used to transport woollen goods to and from Pudsey, Shipley and Bradford. The original ford was situated off Calverley Lane, but was replaced by a stone footbridge at the turn of the 19th century.

The three unnamed Saxon thegns who held the land at the Conquest gave way to the king who granted it to lesser Norman nobles, but not long after most of the village came under the control of Kirkstall Abbey, a Cistercian house founded in 1152 on the bank of the River Aire downstream of Horsforth.

After the Dissolution of the Monasteries in 1539, Horsforth was partitioned and sold to five families, one of them – the Stanhopes – achieved supremacy and controlled the village for the next 300 years. The estate record of the Stanhopes is regarded as one of the most extensive and important collections of its kind, complementing the extensive medieval record associated with Kirkstall Abbey.

Until the mid 19th century, Horsforth was an agricultural community but it expanded rapidly with the growth of the nearby industrial centre of Leeds. A tannery business was founded at Woodside in about 1820 by the Watson family. It was on the eastern edge of their small farm, and memorialised by Tanhouse Hill Lane. The business became a soap manufacturer and moved to Whitehall Road in Leeds in 1861 and under the chairmanship of Joseph Watson junior, created Baron Manton in 1922, as Joseph Watson & Sons Ltd, became the largest soap supplier to the northeast of England, second in size nationally only to Lever Brothers. Industrially, Horsforth has a history of producing high-quality stone from its quarries. Not only did it supply Kirkstall Abbey with building materials and millstones in the medieval period, it provided the stone for Scarborough's seafront and sent sandstone from Golden Bank Quarry as far afield as Egypt. Situated on Horsforth Beck (Oil Mill Beck) were mills serving the textile trade.

Between 1861 and 1862, there was an outbreak of typhoid.

Horsforth was historically a township in the parish of Guiseley. It became a separate civil parish in 1866. In the late-19th century it achieved note as the village with the largest population in England. Railways, turnpike roads, tramways and the nearby canal made it a focus for almost all forms of public and commercial transport and it became a dormitory suburb of Leeds. The civil parish became Horsforth Urban District in 1894. The parish and urban district were abolished in 1974 and merged into the new City of Leeds metropolitan district. In 1999 Horsforth became a civil parish and a parish council was created, which exercised its right to declare Horsforth a town.

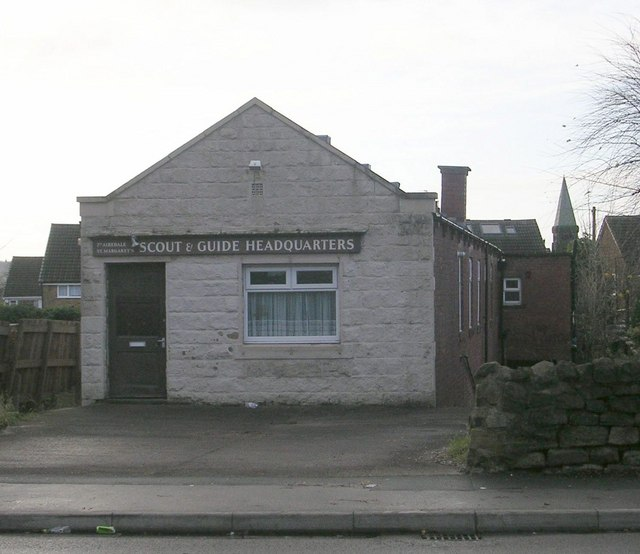
Scout and Guide hut

Horsforth Village Museum has collections and displays illustrating aspects of life set against the backdrop of the changing role of the village.

During the Second World War the £241,000 required to build the corvette HMS Aubrietia was raised entirely by the people of Horsforth. In 2000 the US President Bill Clinton acknowledged Horsforth's contribution to the war effort in a letter sent to MP Paul Truswell. The letter is in the museum. The Scout and Guide hut on New Road Side was requisitioned during the war as an emergency mortuary for the factories based around what is now Leeds Bradford Airport (Yeadon Aerodrome at the time), but it was never needed. The building was later used as a cafe, serving as a popular stop-off on the way out to Otley, Ilkley and the Dales, before being purchased by the scouts and guides.

In October 2020 Horsforth was named the most musical village in Britain as it was revealed that 22 home-grown acts were in the running for the charts with their latest singles.

== Transport ==
=== Rail ===
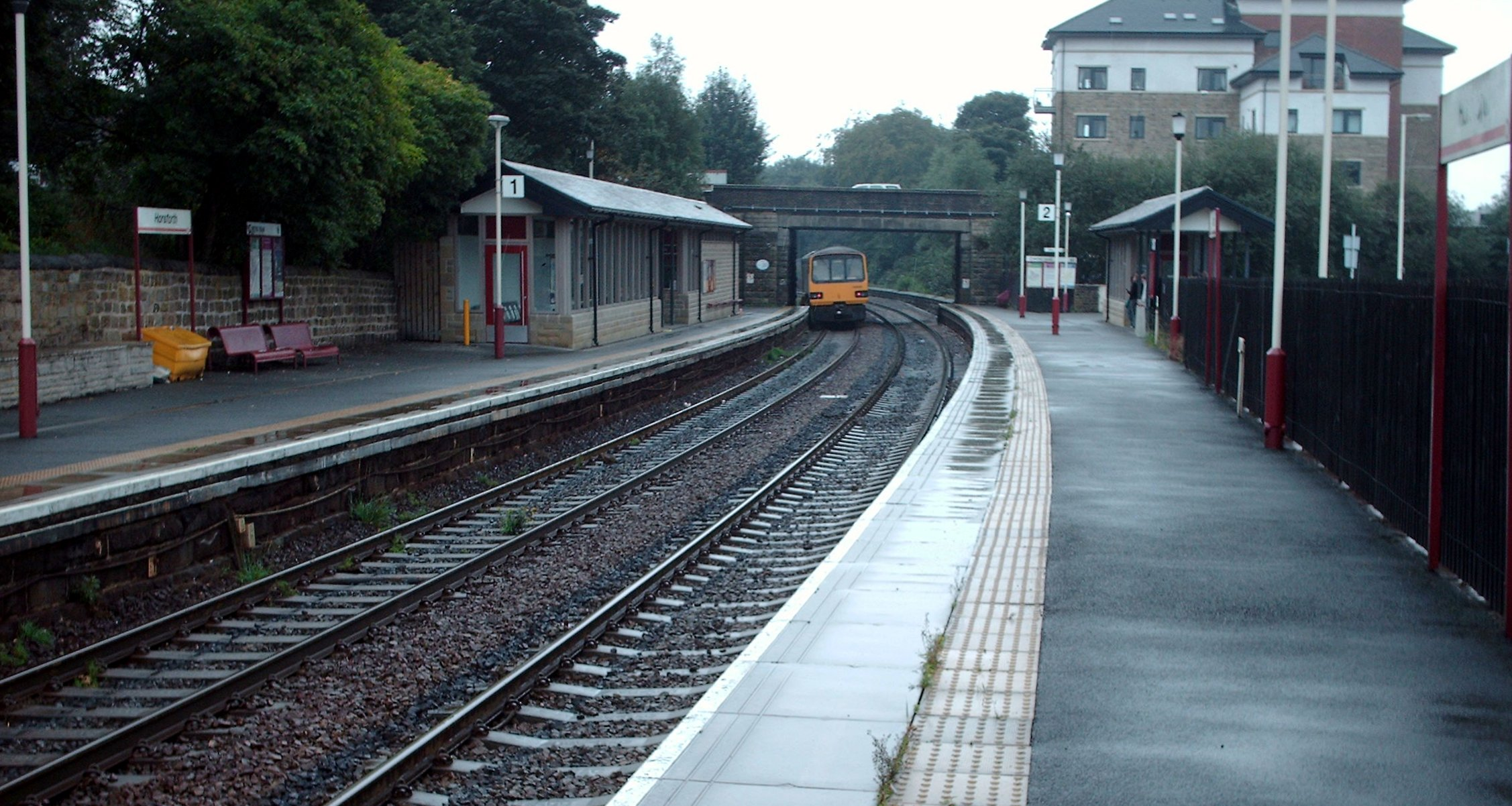
Horsforth station looking south towards Leeds

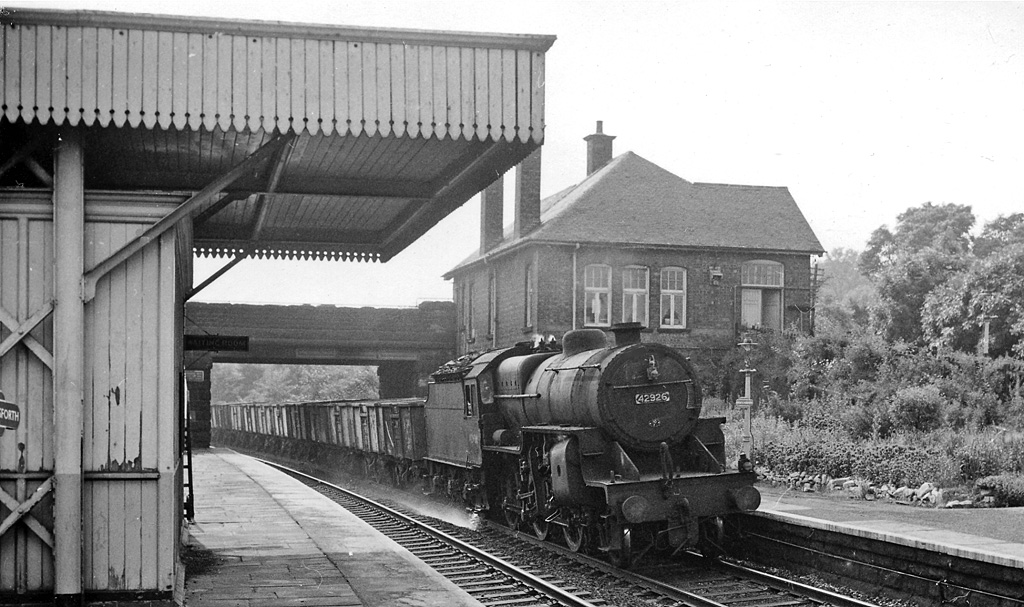
Newlay & Horsforth station with a freight train in 1964

Horsforth railway station is on the Harrogate line between Harrogate and Leeds. The station is just outside the Horsforth parish boundary, on the Cookridge side of Moseley Beck.

Kirkstall Forge railway station is located in Kirkstall near the boundary with Horsforth, around two miles from Horsforth station. It is on the Leeds to Bradford Line between Leeds City and Shipley and was opened on 19 June 2016, near the site of an earlier station with the same name.

Newlay station, which was built by the Midland Railway, was renamed Newlay & Horsforth station in 1889. It was situated south of the River Aire and was accessible from Horsforth on Pollard Lane which connects Horsforth to Bramley. The station on the Airedale line was renamed Newlay station in 1961. It closed on 22 March 1965, along with other stations on the Airedale line: Armley Canal Road, Kirkstall, Calverley & Rodley and Apperley Bridge.

=== Bus ===
The town is served by several bus routes.

=== Airport ===
The nearest airport is Leeds Bradford Airport, in neighbouring Yeadon approximately 2.6 miles away.

== Education ==
Leeds Trinity University, formerly Leeds Trinity University College, is an independent university after a period as an accredited college of the University of Leeds. The residential campus is located off Brownberrie Lane, Horsforth.

The further education college Leeds City College has a former site in Horsforth which was called the Horsforth Campus which has lain redundant since it closed in June 2017. Housing has now been built on the site. It was previously part of Park Lane College.

The main secondary school is Horsforth School. Horsforth's state sector primary schools are West End Lane Primary School, St Margaret's Primary School, Newlaithes Primary School, Westbrook Lane Primary School, Broadgate Lane Primary School, St Mary's Catholic Primary School and Featherbank Primary School.

Featherbank School opened in 1911 as a primary school, replacing the Grove Day School. The school's infant department was moved to the Grove Methodist Church on Stanhope Drive in 1933, but in 1960 transferred to the Featherbank School annexe. In 1972 Featherbank juniors (7–11 years) were allocated places at the newly built Newlaithes Junior School, at which point Featherbank became purely an infants' school (4–7 years). In September 2011 Featherbank reverted to being a full primary school.

There is a private primary school, The Froebelian School, providing independent preparatory education.

== Architecture ==
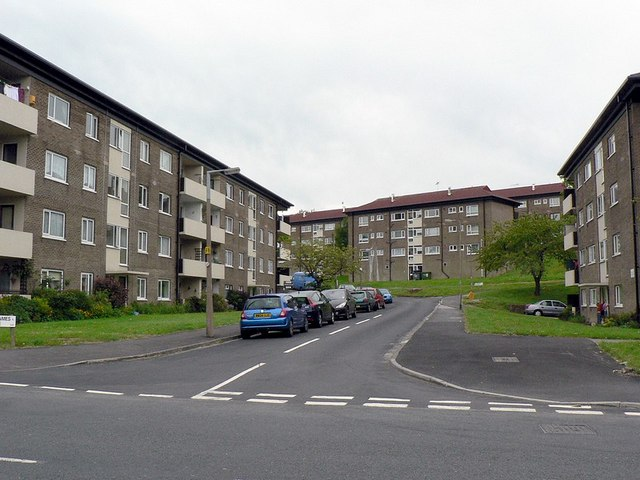
Flats in Horsforth

Horsforth has a large percentage of sandstone buildings sourced from local quarries, more than any other part of Leeds. A draft design statement was produced in 2010, which summarises much of the architectural and historical character.

== Churches ==
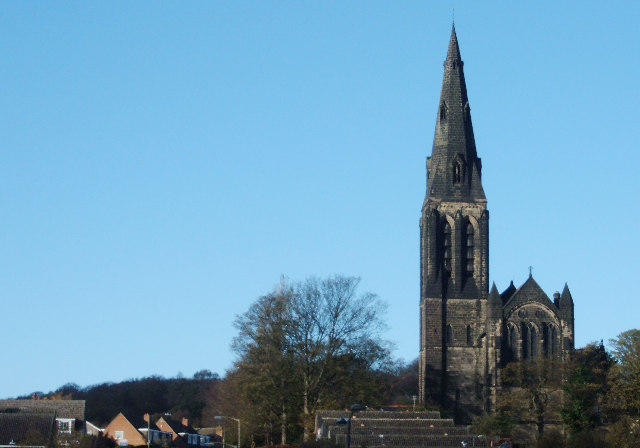
St Margaret's Church

The main churches in Horsforth are;

- Lister Hill Baptist Church
- Cragg Hill Baptist Church
- St Margaret's Church of England
- St James Woodside Church of England
- Kingdom Hall of Jehovah's Witnesses
- Central Methodist Church, Town Street
- Grove Methodist Church
- Woodside Methodist Church
- Willow Green Christian Fellowship Pentecostal
- St Mary's Roman Catholic Church
- Leeds Trinity University campus chapel
- Comboni Missionaries, Brownberrie Lane
- Emmanuel Baptist Church
- Mosaic Church

== Sports clubs and facilities ==
- Yarnbury Rugby Club
- Horsforth Saints FC
- Horsforth St Margaret's AFC
- Horsforth Cricket Club
- Horsforth Hall Park Cricket Club
- Horsforth Harriers running club
- Horsforth Fellandale running club
- Horsforth Golf Club
- Old Ball Football Pitches (Home of Horsforth St Margaret's FC)
- Cragg Hill Football Pitches (Home of Horsforth St Margaret's FC and AFC Horsforth Reserves)
- The Rec football pitch (Home of Horsforth Ringway)
- Horsforth School Astroturf (Owned by Horsforth School)
- Horsforth School Football and Rugby Pitches (Owned by Horsforth School and Home of AFC Horsforth Firsts)
- Horsforth Ladies Hockey Club
- West Yorkshire Wolves Junior Rugby League Club
- Horsforth Tennis Club
- LS18 Rocks Music School

== Nightlife ==
Given its size, Horsforth has a relatively high number of bars and pubs of varying types from traditional pubs going back to the 17th century to more modern café bars and lounges. Horsforth Town Street has the highest concentration of these with several bars and pubs within a short distance of each other. Other popular night life areas include Station Road and New Road Side.

== Notable people ==
- Although originally from London, in the 1970s the former leader of the Labour Party Ed Miliband attended Featherbank Primary School, and his brother David Miliband attended Newlaithes Primary School, when their father Ralph Miliband was a professor at the University of Leeds
- The footballer James Milner who attended Horsforth School and used to play for Leeds United, Newcastle United, Aston Villa, Manchester City and Liverpool. He currently plays for Brighton and Hove Albion and was an English International Footballer.
- The actors Matthew Lewis (Neville Longbottom in the Harry Potter film series), Patric Knowles and Frazer Hines
- The keyboard player Nick Baines, from the Kaiser Chiefs
- The singer Marc Almond, who was educated at Featherbank Primary School
- David Oxtoby, artist
- Actor Malcolm McDowell, famous for his film roles including If...., A Clockwork Orange and O Lucky Man!.
- Alistair and Jonny Brownlee (triathlon)
- Paralympic gold medallist David Stone
- Olympic cycling bronze medallist Jonny Clay
- Sean Conlon who was in the boyband Five, grew up in Horsforth and attended St Mary's RC Primary School.
- BTCC racing driver Sam Tordoff
- Kathryn Apanowicz (1960–2025), a British actress notable for appearing in EastEnders.
- Stanley Metcalfe (1932–2017), first-class cricketer
- Frank Kershaw (1879–1959), first-class cricketer
- Belinda O'Hooley, folk musician, born in Horsforth
- Nia Archives, DJ, record producer, singer and songwriter

== Gallery ==
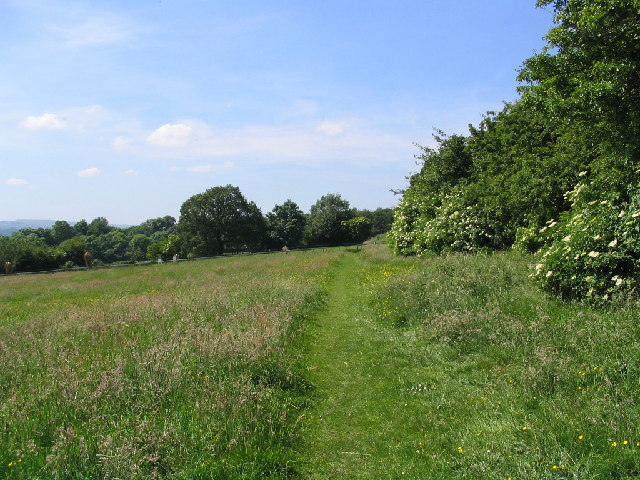
Leeds Country Way close to Horsforth

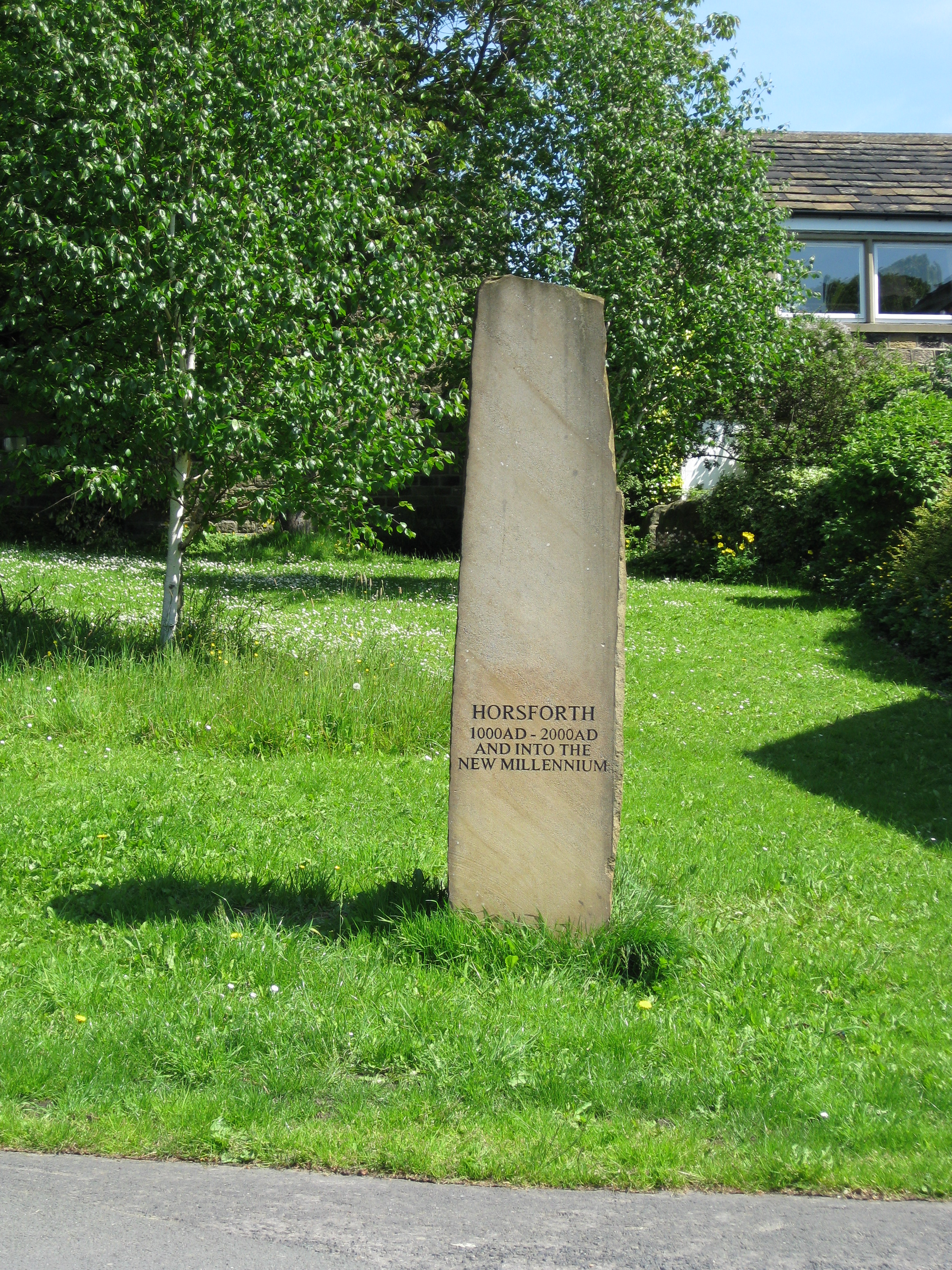
Horsforth Millennium Stone

== See also ==
- Listed buildings in Horsforth
