= Coking factory =

Type of factory

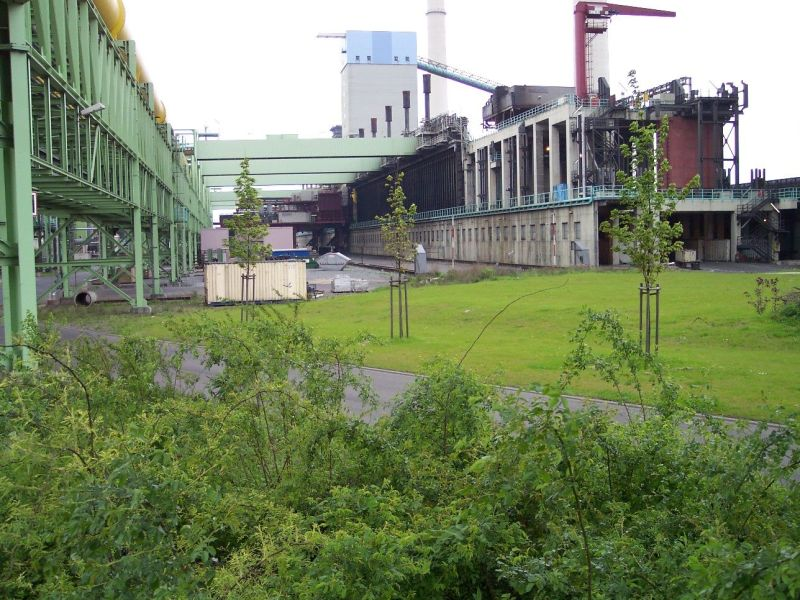
A modern coking plant: the Carbonaria plant in Duisburg–Schwelgern, operated by ThyssenKrupp since 2003.

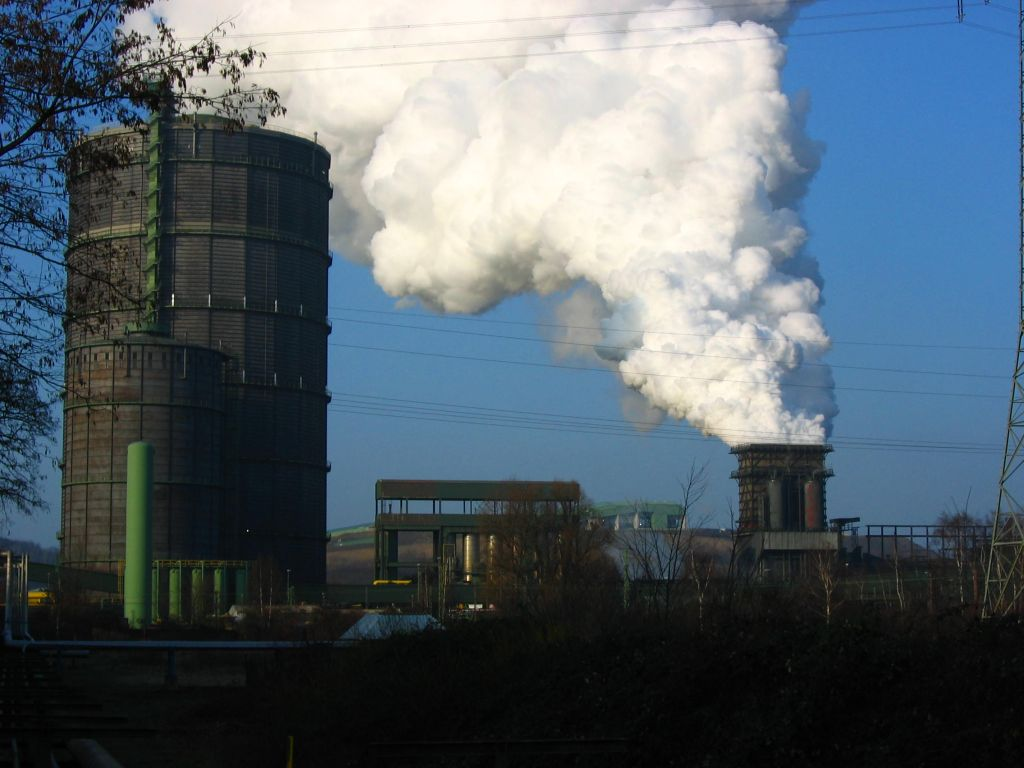
ArcelorMittal's Prosper coking plant in Bottrop with its quenching tower (right) and low-pressure gasometer (left) (Thyssen construction).

A coking factory or a coking plant is where coke and manufactured gas are synthesized from coal using a dry distillation process. The volatile components of the pyrolyzed coal, released by heating to a temperature of between 900 and 1,400 °C (1,650 and 2,550 °F), are generally drawn off and recovered. There are also coking plants where the released components are burned: this is known as a heat recovery process. A layer of ash then forms on the surface of the resulting coke. The degassing of the coal gives the coke a highly sought-after porosity. The gases are broken down by fractional condensation into hydrocarbon tars, sulfuric acid, ammonia, naphthalene, benzol, and coke gas; these products are then purified in further chemical reactors. Germany still has five coking plants in operation (as of 2010) to meet the needs of its domestic industry.

Coke is mainly used to produce cast iron in blast furnaces, which remains its main use today. Degassing considerably reduces its sulfur content, enabling the iron and steel industry to produce higher-quality cast iron with lower emissions. Apart from this, coke ash has more or less the same composition as ordinary hard coal.

== History and principle ==
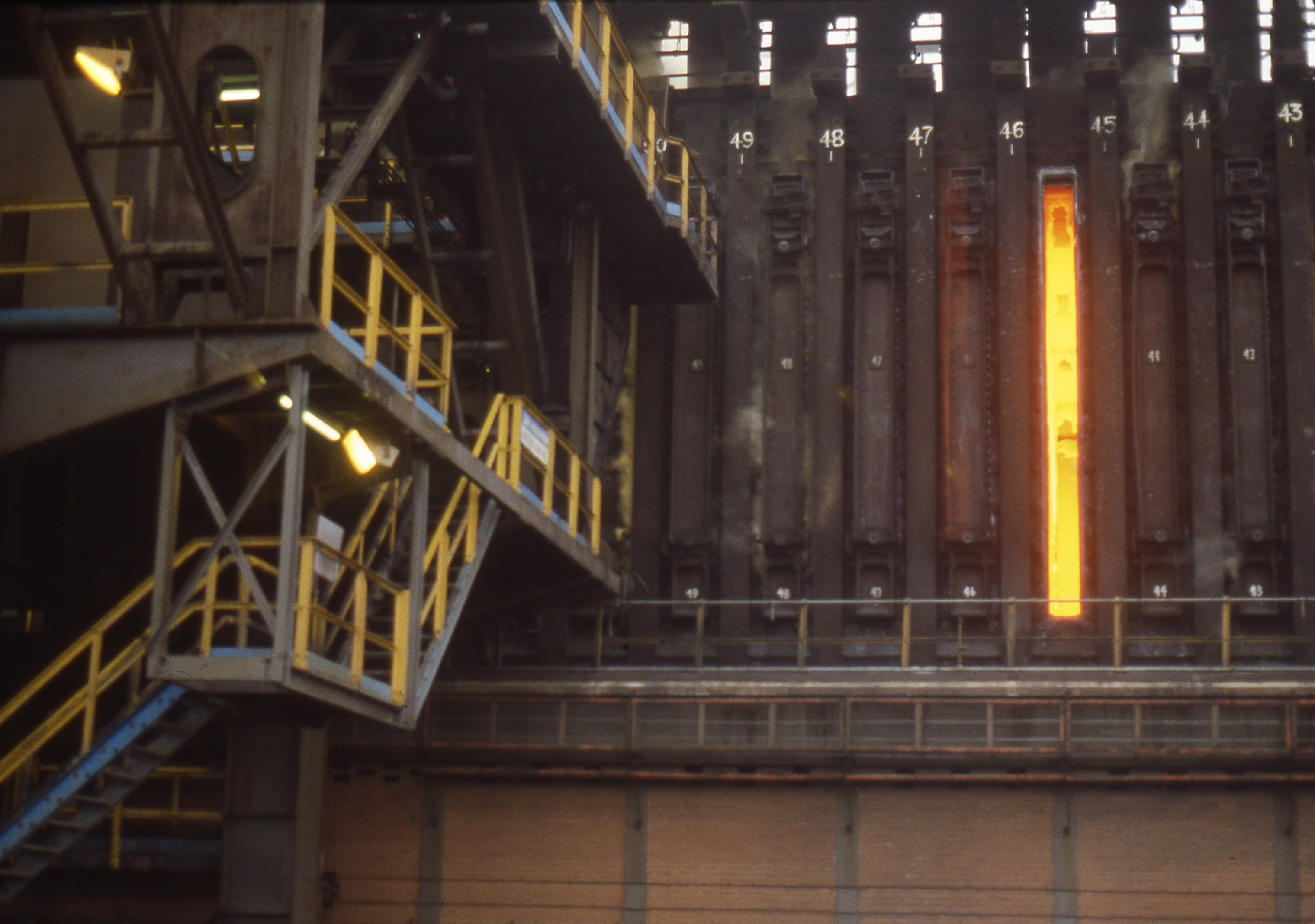
Interior of a coke oven (1976, Wales).

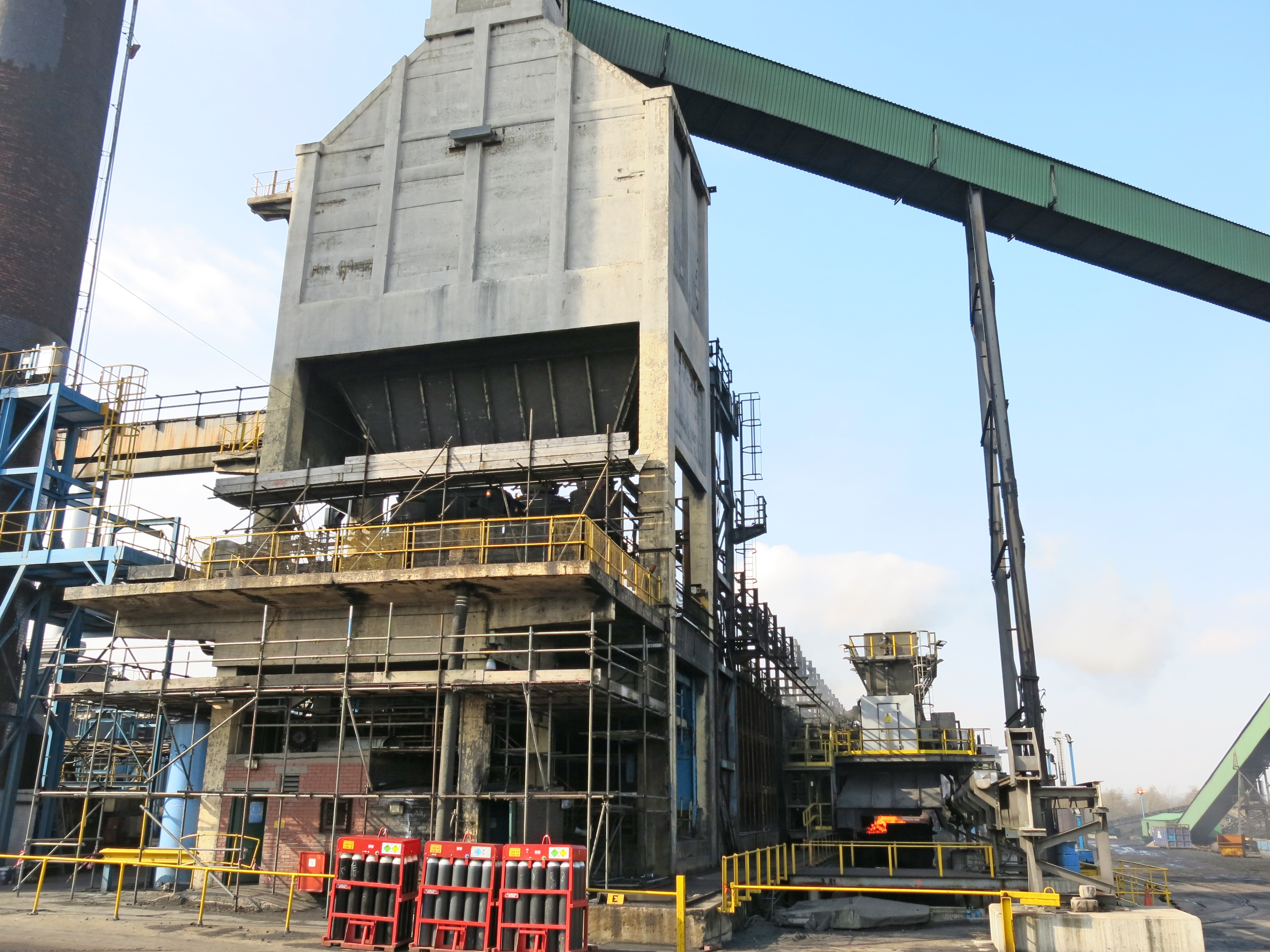
The Monckton Coke Works at Royston, South Yorkshire, in operation discharging glowing coke from one of the bank of ovens on the left in 2013

In the early days of the ferrous metallurgy, charcoal was used exclusively in the production of ores. Raw fossil coals (lignite and black coal) or uncharred wood are unsuitable for iron metallurgy, as their impurity content prevents them from reaching a temperature high enough to produce good cast iron. The demand for charcoal, drawn from coke ovens operating in much the same way as modern coking plants, led to massive clearings that permanently disfigured entire regions (e.g. the Ashdown Forest in England). It wasn't until the 18th century that the idea of purifying natural coal in coking plants was conceived. The new fuel soon displaced charcoal entirely, making mass production of cast iron possible, and hence the railroads.

Heating coal in the absence of air produces coke, a particularly carbon-rich fuel that is purer and of higher quality than natural coal. By controlling the process, specific performance levels can be achieved with the following properties:

- water content;
- ash content;
- sulfur content;
- grain size;
- hardness;
- friability.

Coke is most often used in blast furnaces and foundries. One of the most important properties of blast furnace coke is its hardness, which it retains even at high temperatures: thus, while serving as a fuel, it ensures the stability of the stack of iron ores and flux, whereas ordinary hard coal would bake and hinder the oxygenation of the mixture.

== Description ==
=== Coke ovens ===
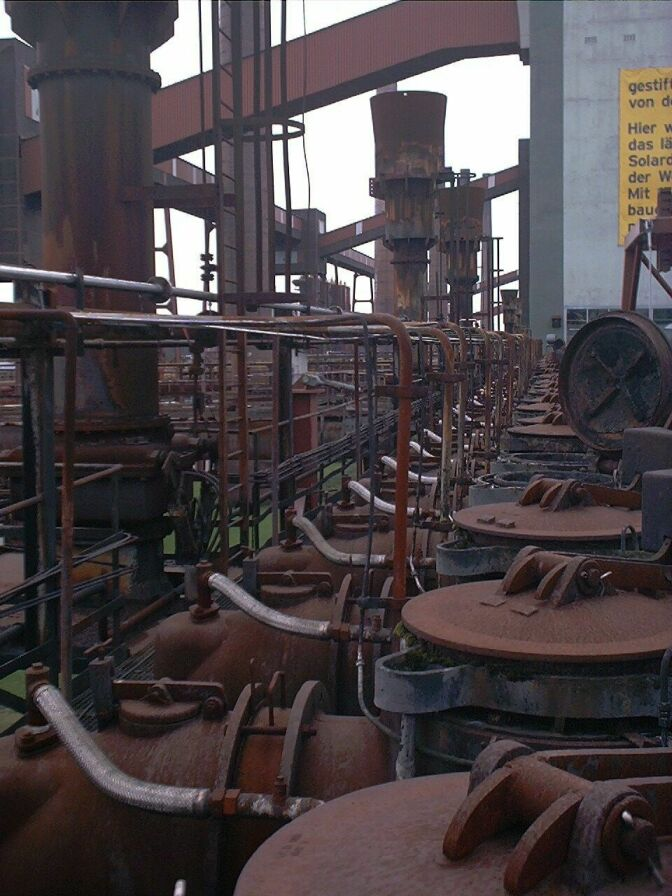
Gas emission

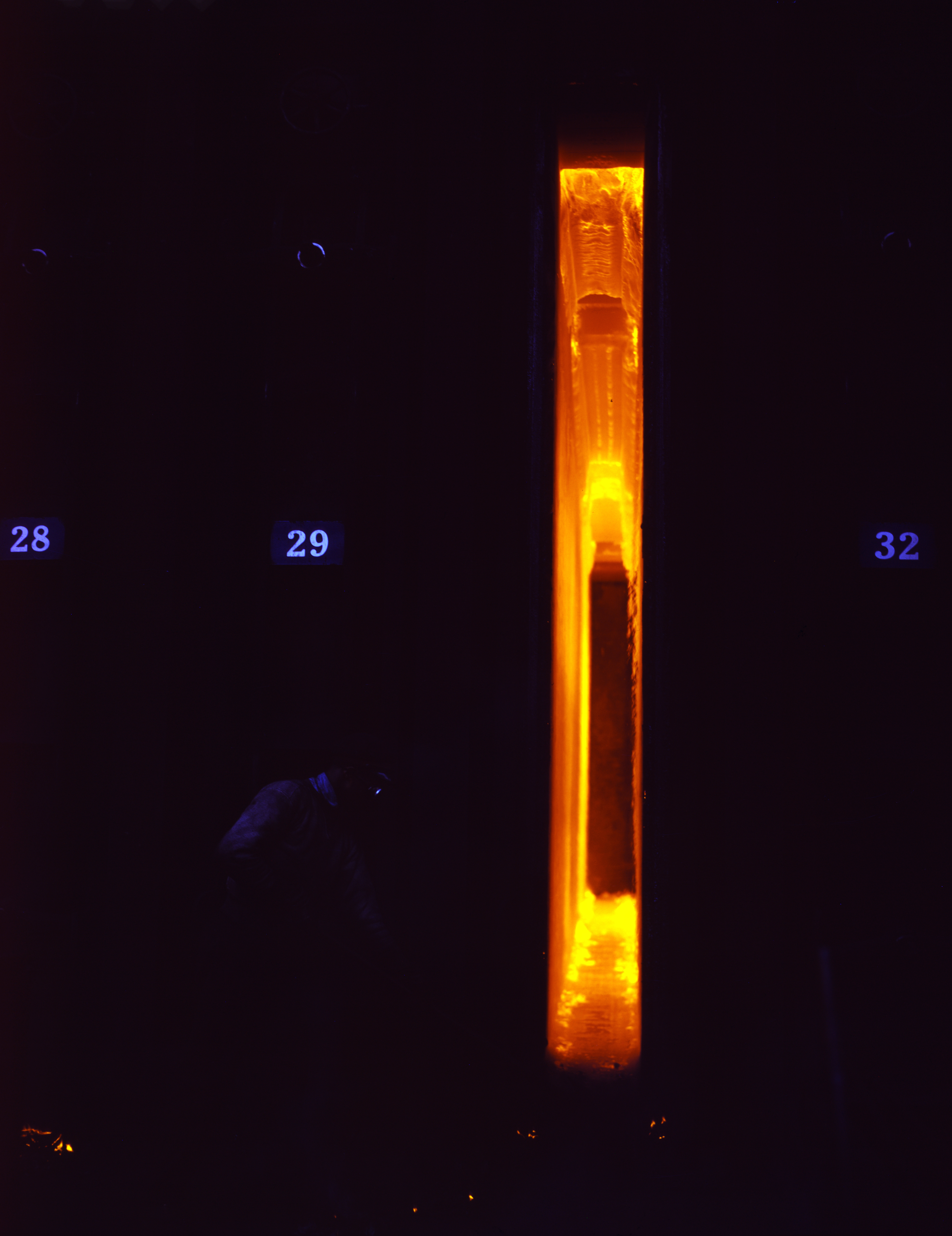
Coke oven interior: detail (1942, US). Photographed by Arthur Siegel.

The coke oven is the central element of a coking plant. Horizontal ovens, which are the most commonly used (they are suitable for monitoring the various extraction stages), take the form of narrow compartments (approx. 50 cm (20 in) wide), but several meters high and several meters deep. Modern compartments have a volume of up to 100 m^{3} (3,500 ft^{3}) (e.g. 0.5 m × 6 m × 32 m (1.6 ft × 19.7 ft × 105.0 ft)). As a rule, these furnaces are arranged in a battery, separated by injectors for gases burned at between 1,200 and 1,400 °C (2,190 and 2,550 °F), which ensures that the internal temperature is maintained. These gases come from the smoke evacuators, which also ensure heat recovery. The blast furnace gas can also be used to heat the lower floors, where it is mixed with gas from the coal roaster. Every half-hour, the heating of the furnace battery alternates between the sides and the top, to ensure isotropic coal roasting.

After an initial phase of around three months following commissioning, the heating system of a coking plant runs continuously. Heating up too quickly, or stopping too abruptly, is accompanied by thermal stresses that cause irreparable damage to the furnaces.

Furnaces, like blast furnaces, are lined internally with refractory layers of chamotte or silicate. Each furnace has three openings: the front and rear doors, which are about as wide as the furnace itself, and the filling/emptying hatch at the top. An oleo-hydraulic rake adjusts the coal layers horizontally inside the furnace.

=== The roof ===
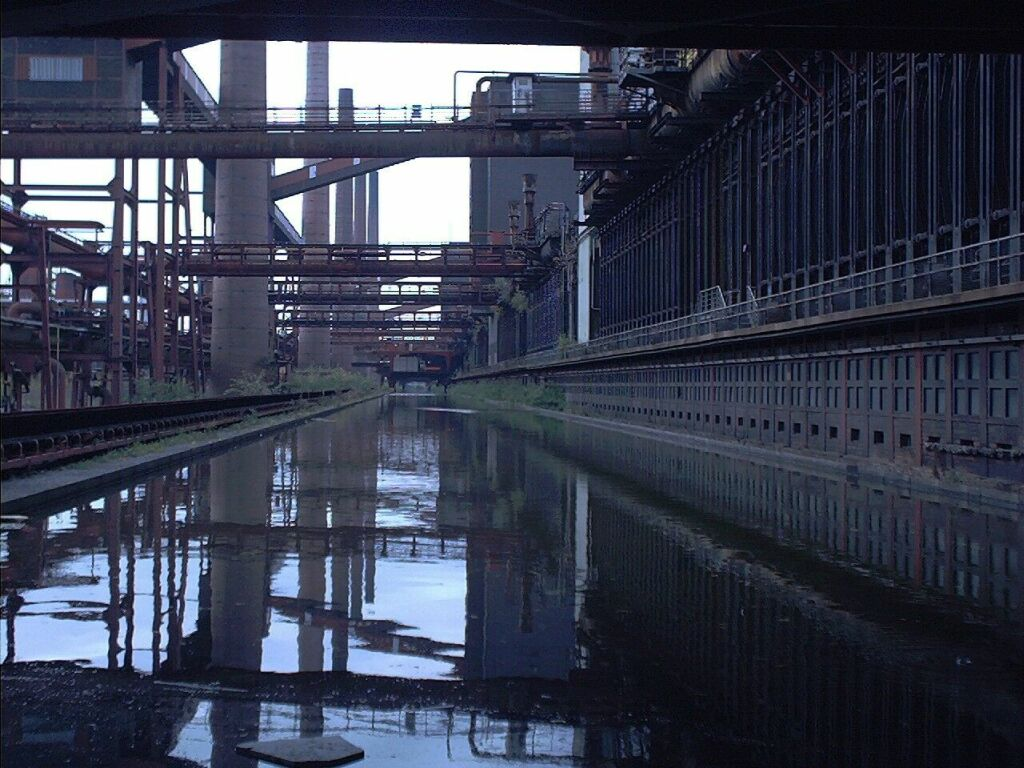
View of the furnaces, on the feeder side (visible in the background), at the Zollverein coking plant, part of Essen's World Heritage List.

The roof is not just the closing slab of the furnace battery: it's also where the overhead crane carrying the coal bucket comes to load each individual furnace. For the worker in charge of this operation, exposure to risk is at a maximum: dust, heat, and flames make the task extremely perilous.

=== Coal bins ===
Depending on the type of furnace, coal bins are located either on top of the furnace battery or at one end. Each bin contains the quantity of coal required to fill one furnace. These bins contain a mixture of coals specially selected for the quality of coke to be produced, and previously screened or pulverized.

=== Bar screen ===
The bar screen is a mobile carriage on rails, positioned along one side of the oven battery. It is designed to take coke briquettes out of the ovens and transport them to the processing site. It is equipped with an articulated arm, often comprising two joints, capable of sweeping the entire length of the oven battery. The hydraulic power unit is located at the base of this articulated arm. The aisle in front of the furnaces along the rails is called the master aisle; it must allow simultaneous passage of the worker in charge of closing the doors and the foreman.

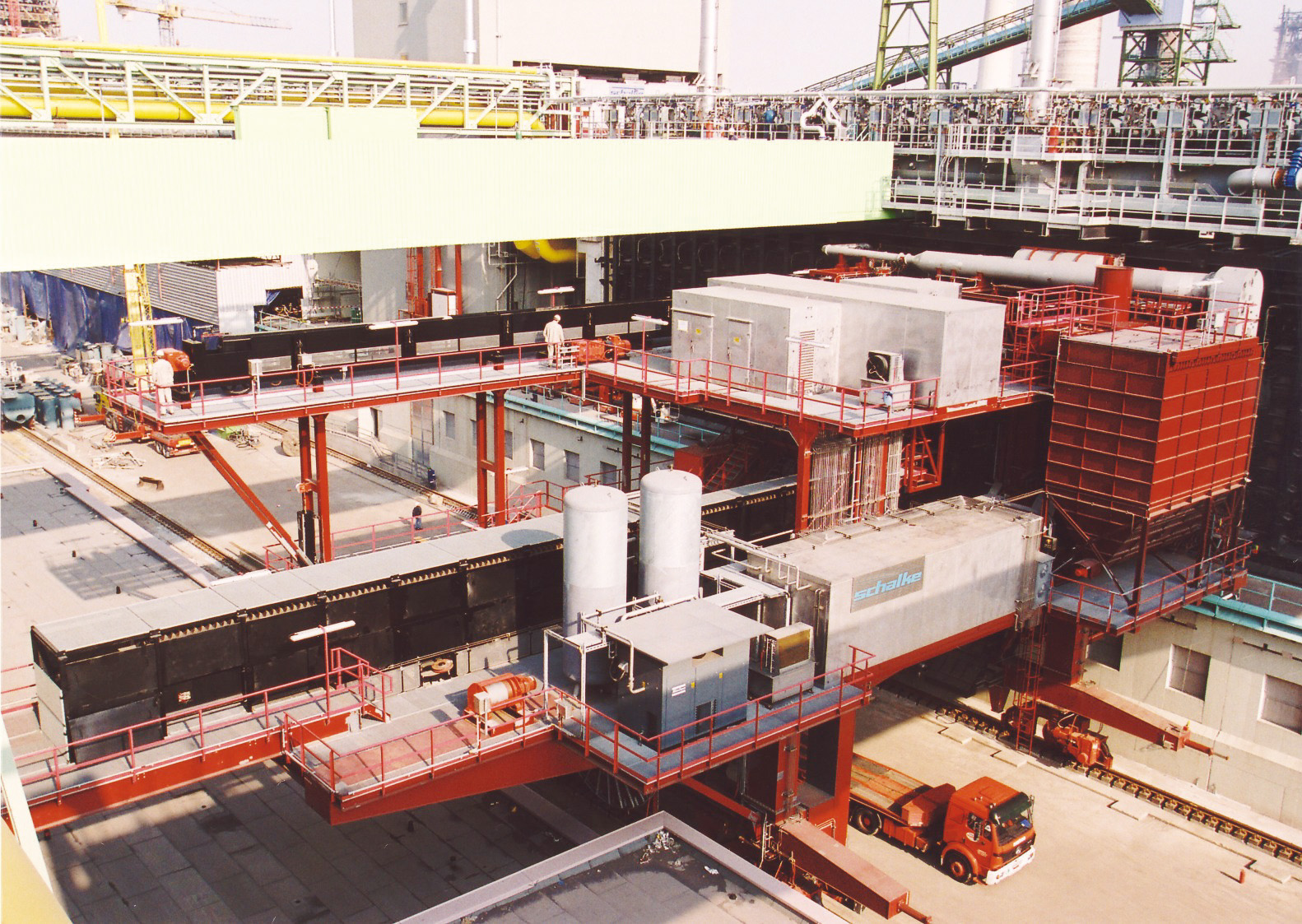
Schwelgern coke screen, Forges de Gelsenkirchen-Schalke.

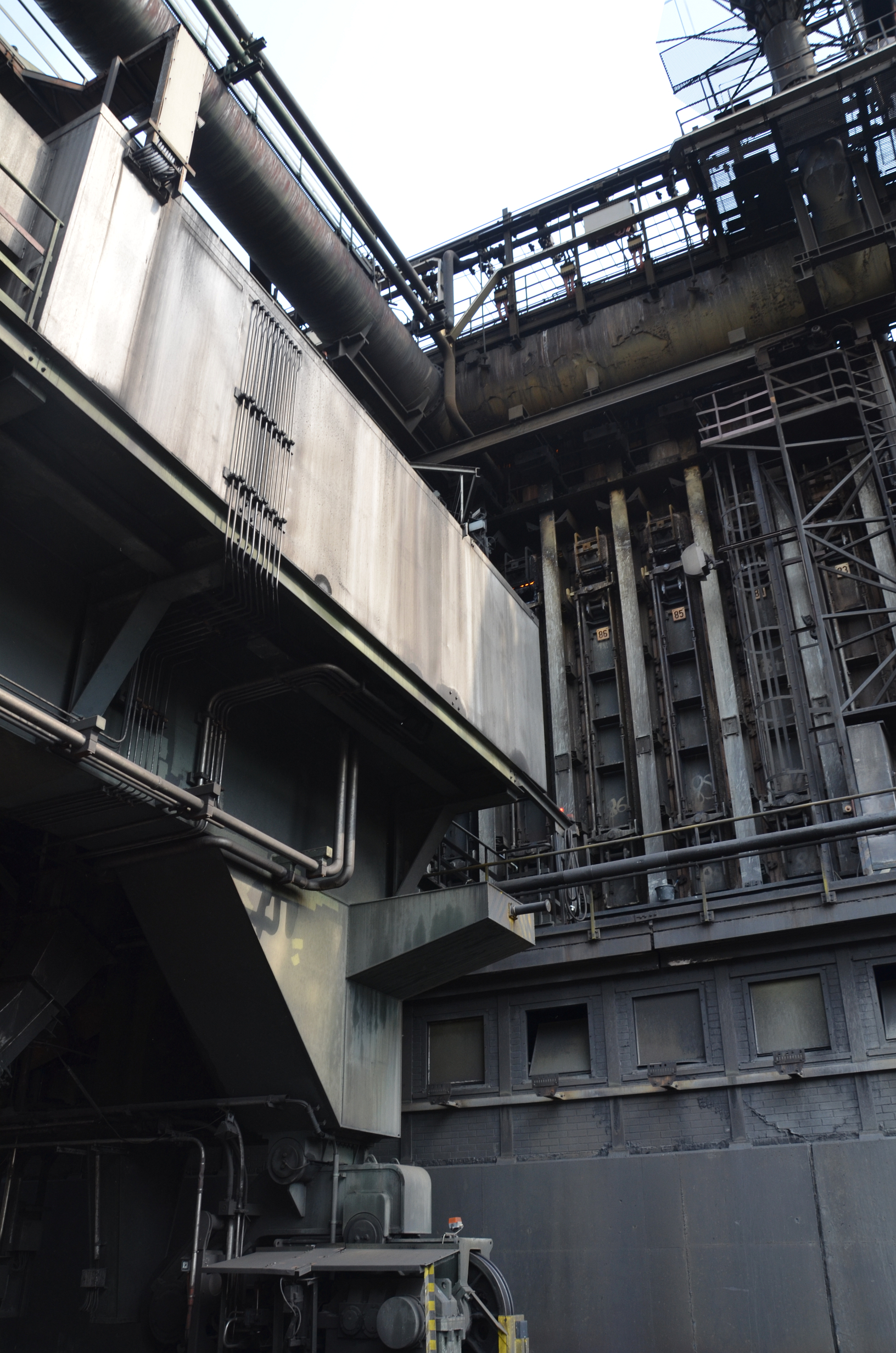
Mobile nacelle for the Prosper coking plant.

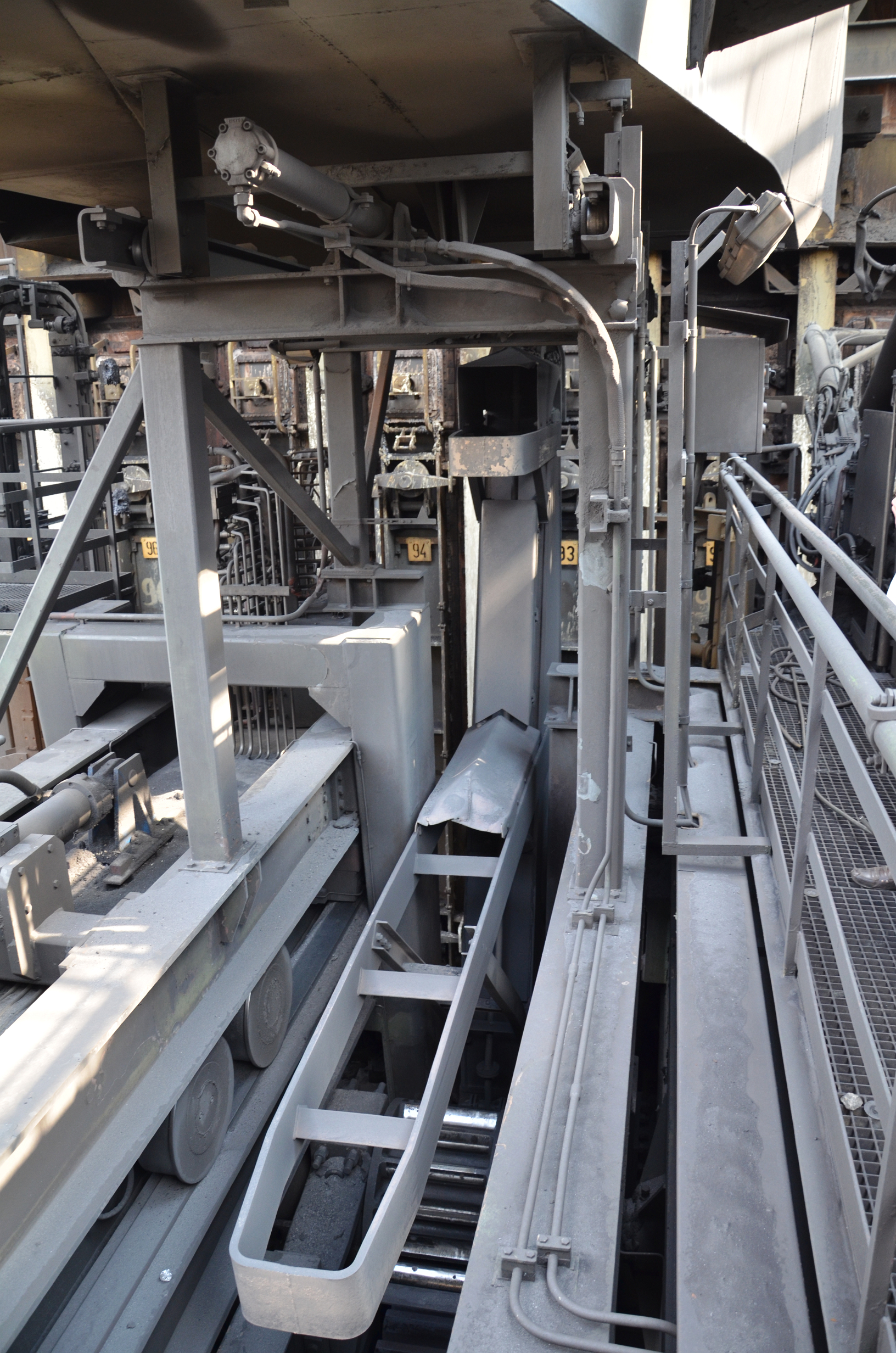
Coke screen before...

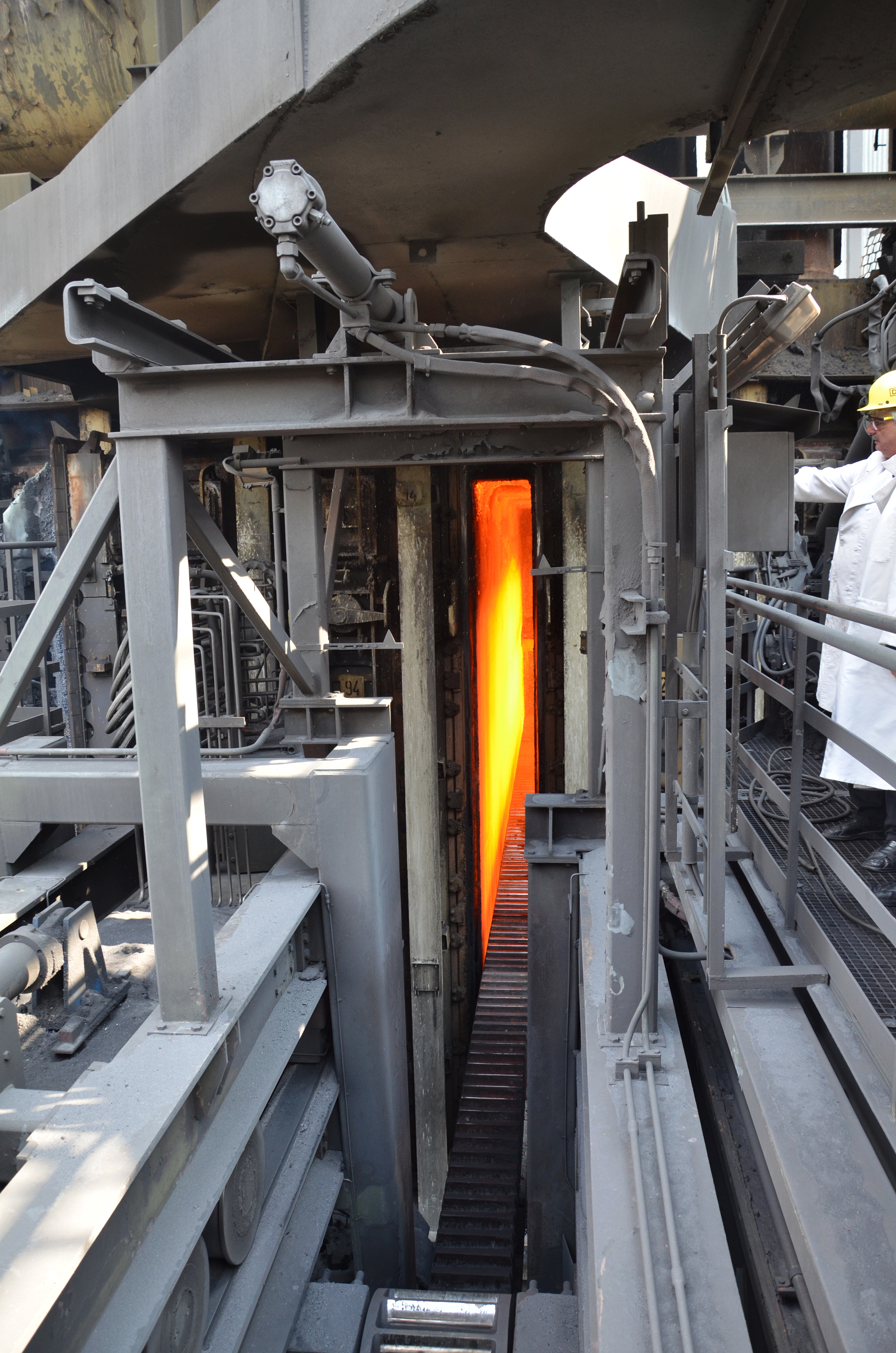
...and after introduction into the oven.

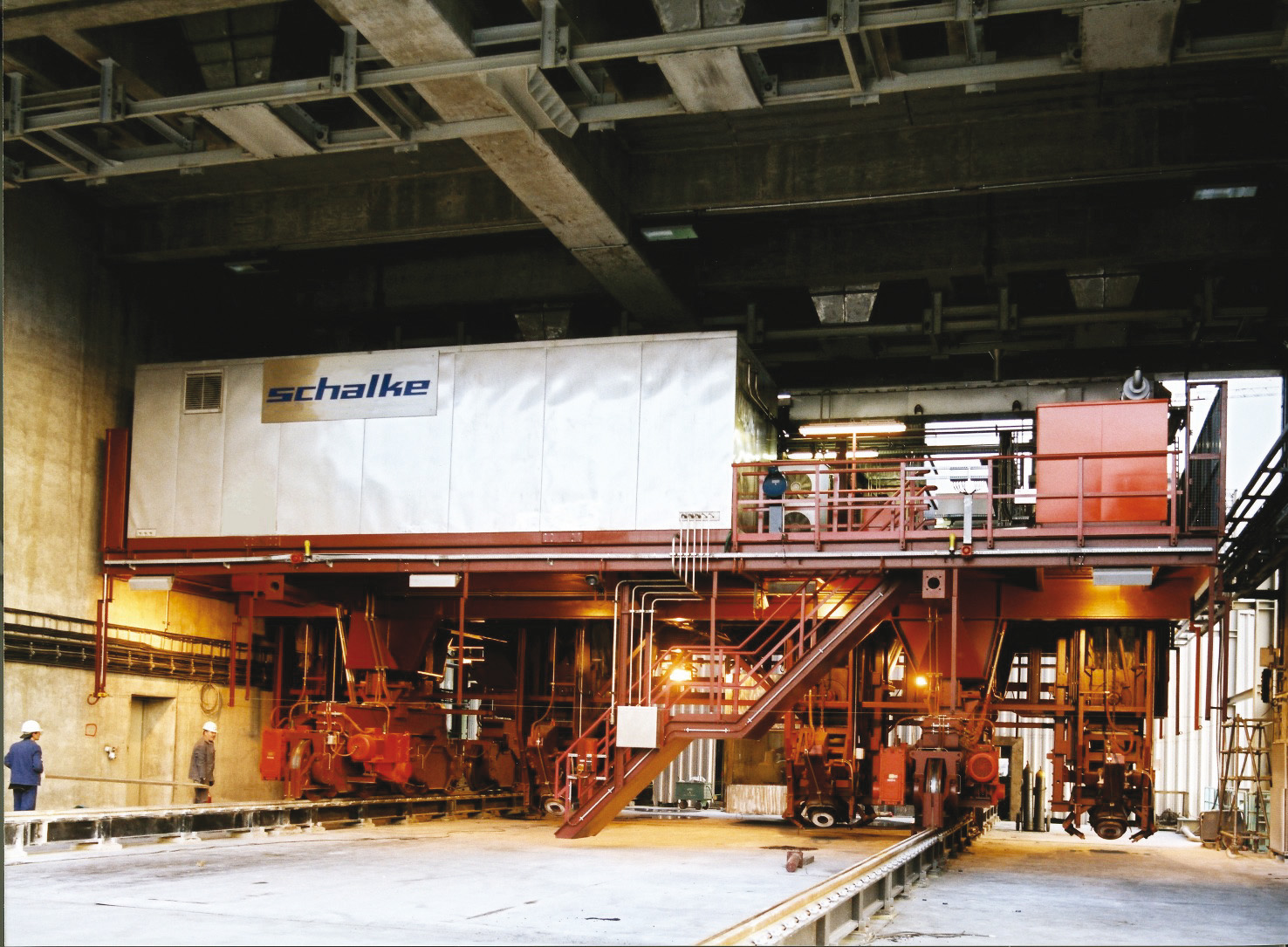
Founder of the cokerie Schwelgern, in the Gelsenkirchen-Schalke forges.

== Sequence of operations ==
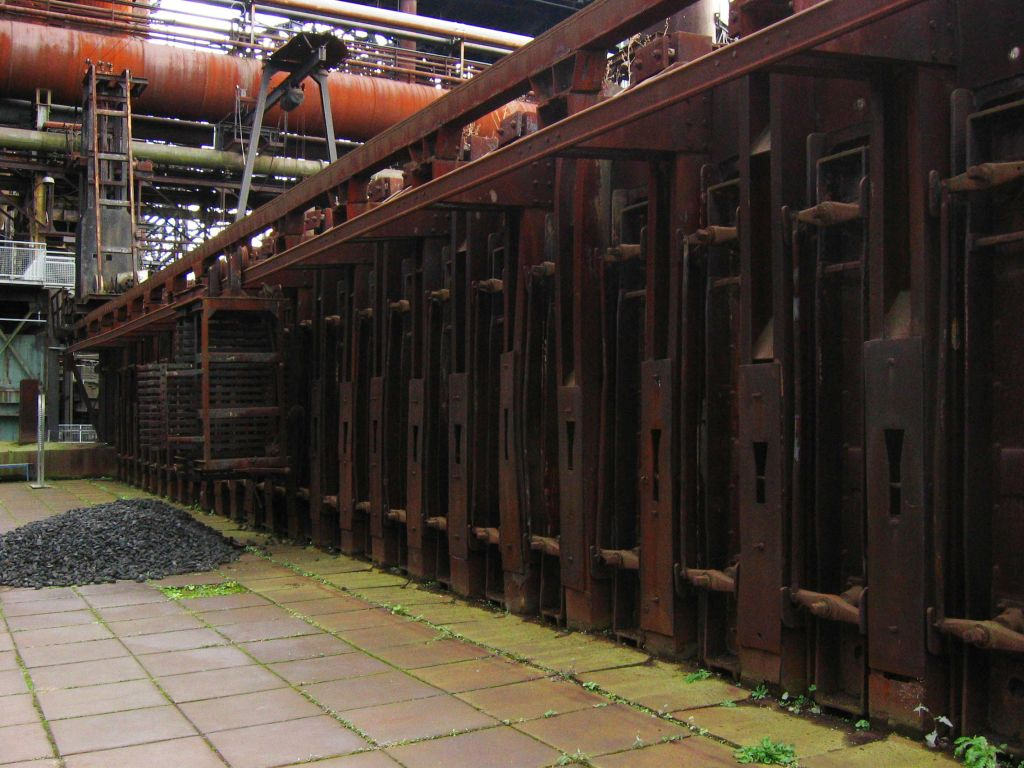
Battery furnaces at the Forges de Völklingen.

- Coal is fed into the furnace, mixed, crushed and compacted;
- Overhead crane opens the feed hatch at the top of the furnace;
- Coal discharge into a single furnace;
- Depending on furnace type or coal quality, coal spiking;
- Airtight closing of the furnace;
- Heating;
- This is followed by degassing and waiting for sufficient porosity;
- Opening of furnace end doors;
- Coke recovery;
- Simultaneous extinguishing and feeding of the furnace for the next cycle.

Once the kiln is full, the kiln feeder returns to the coal hopper and loads the next kiln. Cycles are timed so that a new oven can be started up every two minutes. The kiln walls are continuously heated. Depending on the properties of the coke bricks and the size of the oven, firing takes between 15 and 30 hours.

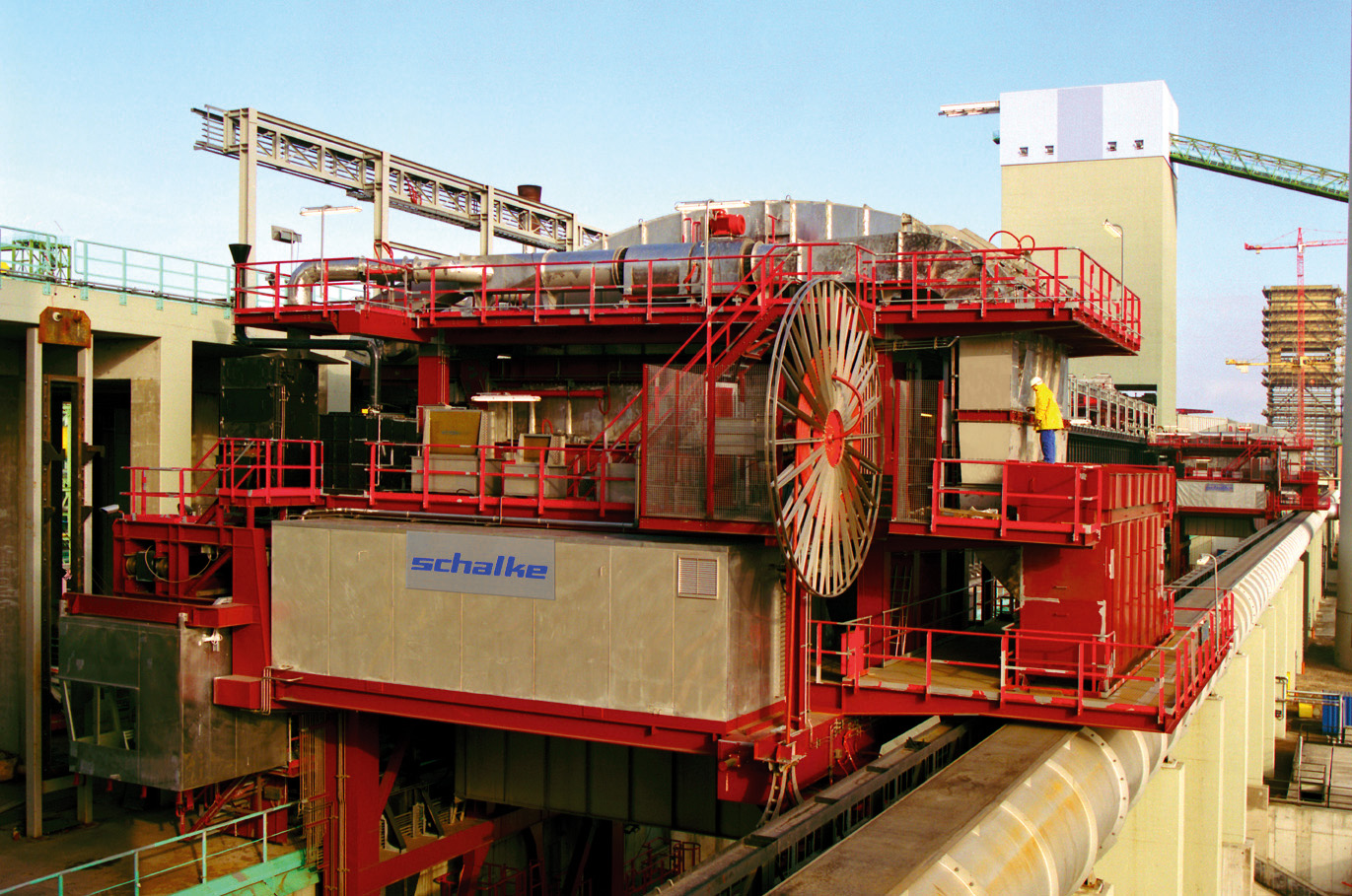
Filling machine at the Schwelgern coking plant, Gelsenkirchen-Schalke Forges.

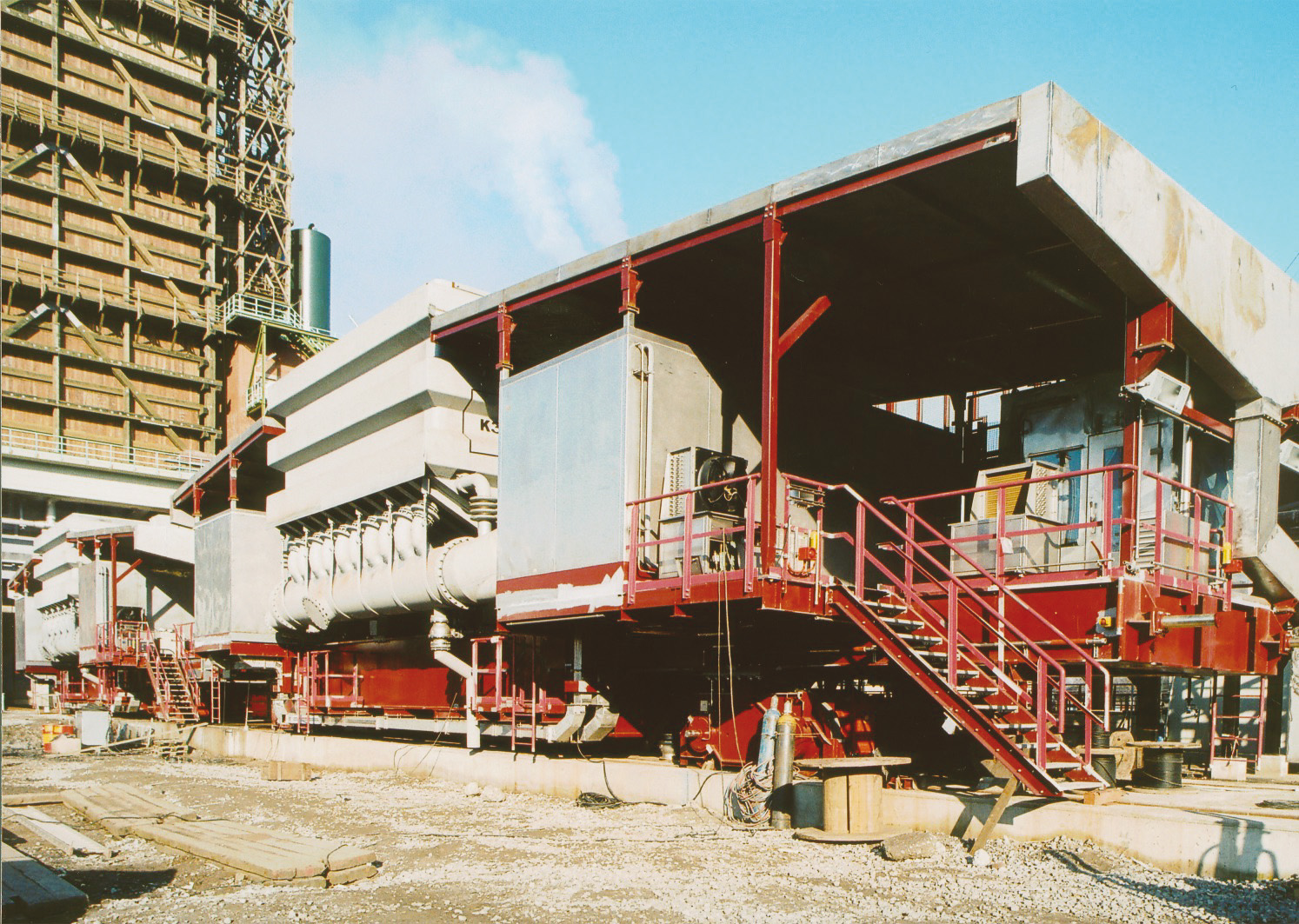
Cooler at the Schwelgern coking plant

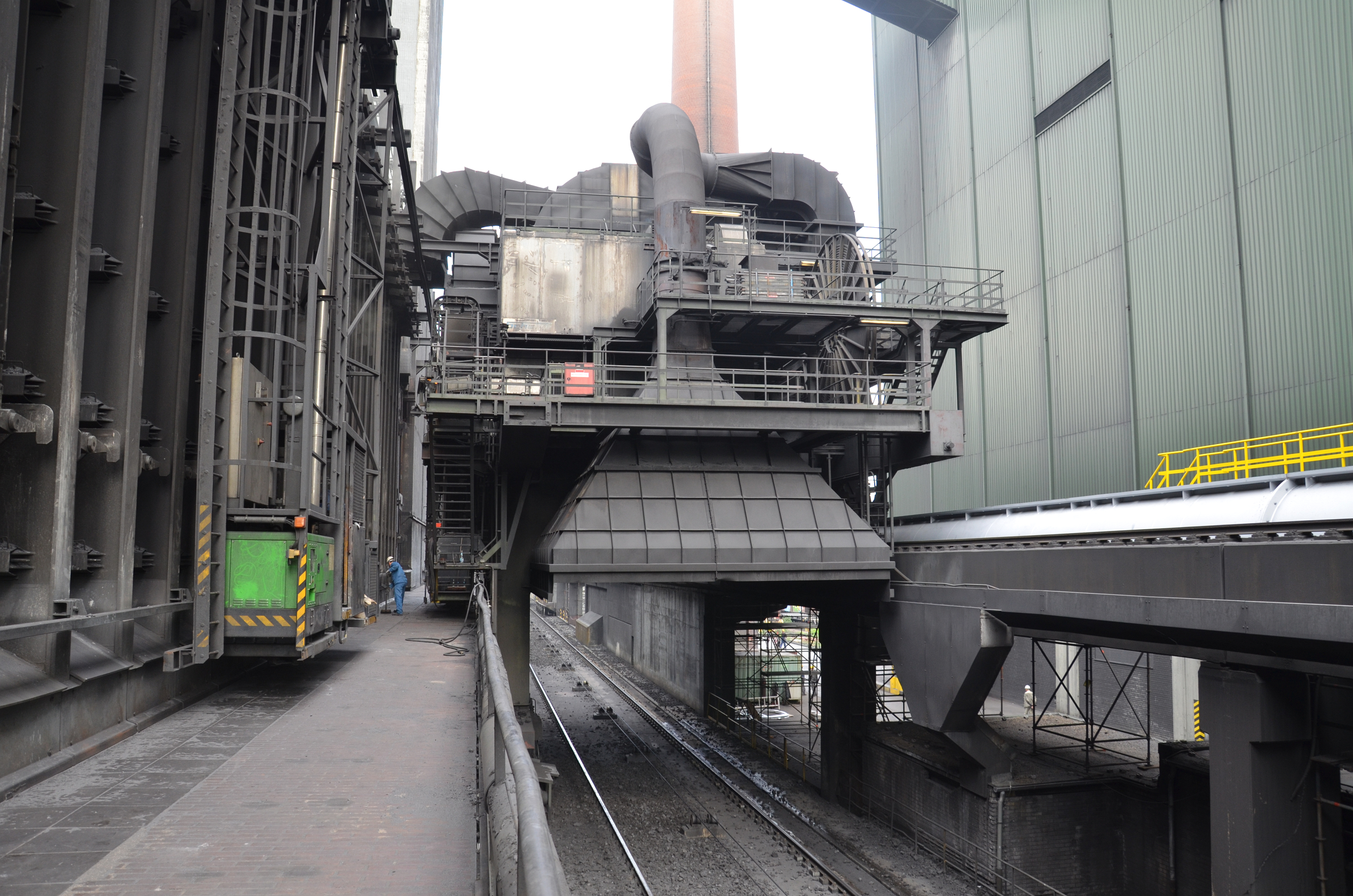
Prosper coking plant cooler hood

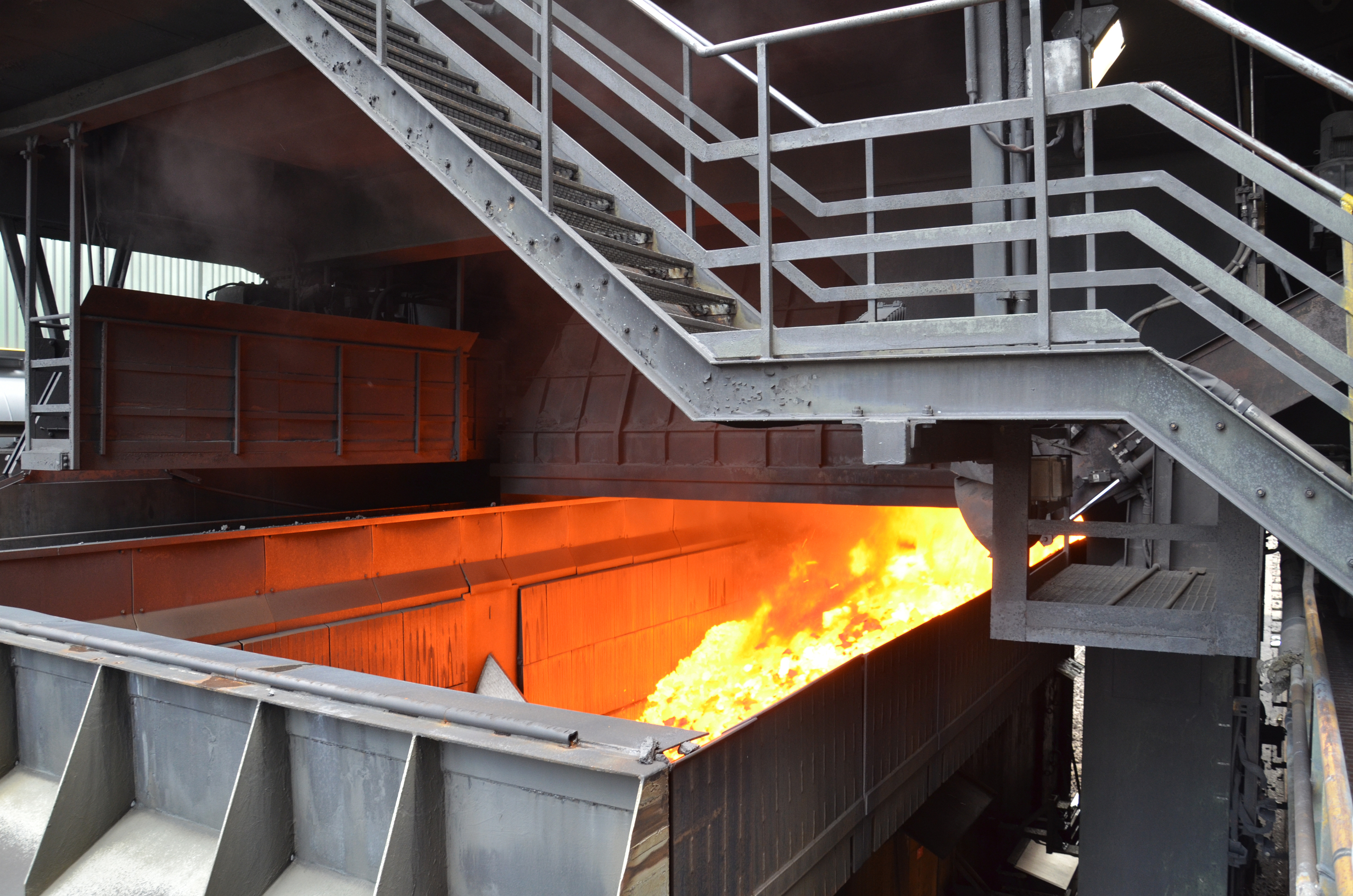
Loading the wagon (or coke-car)

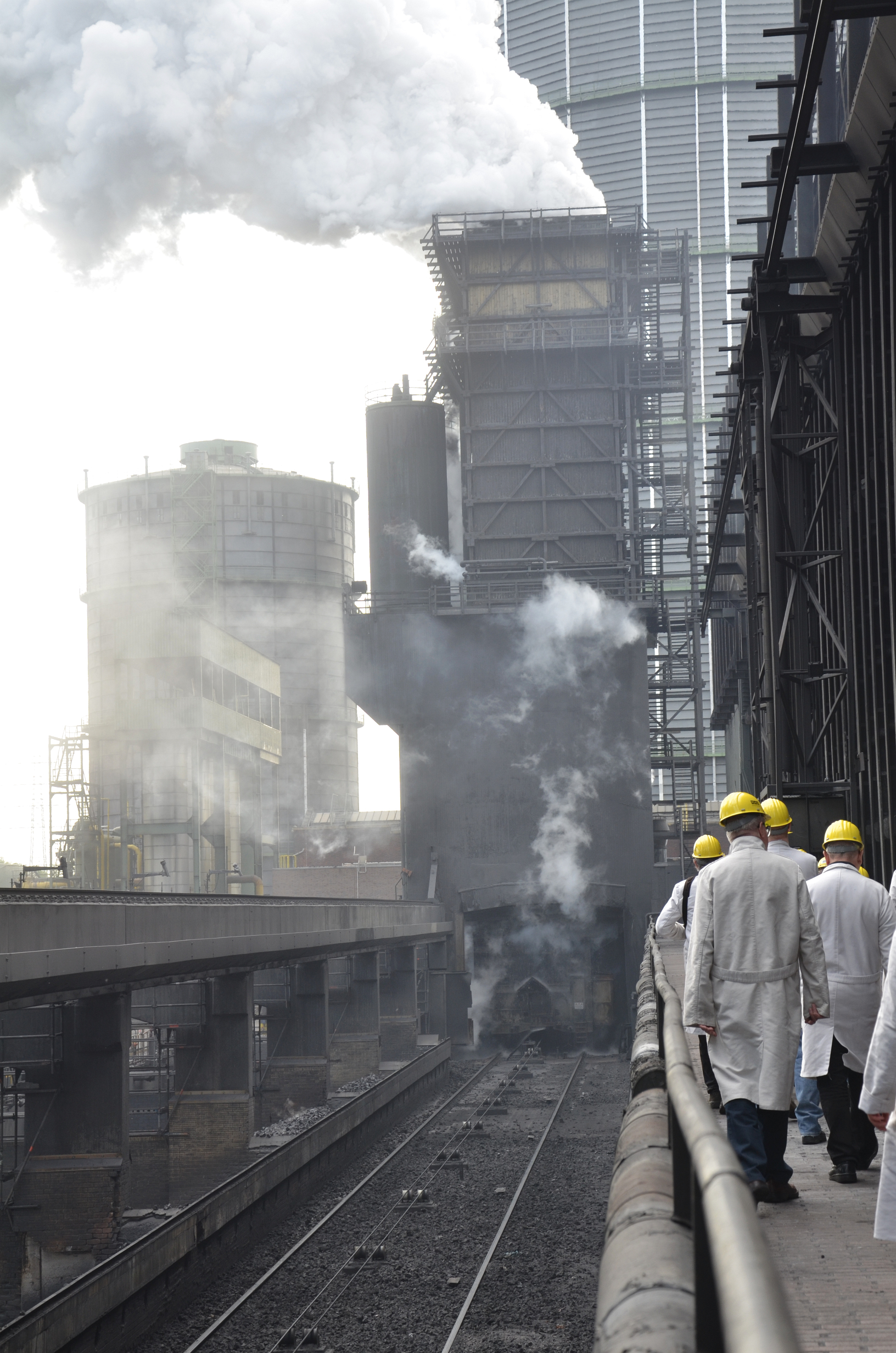
Flow to cooler

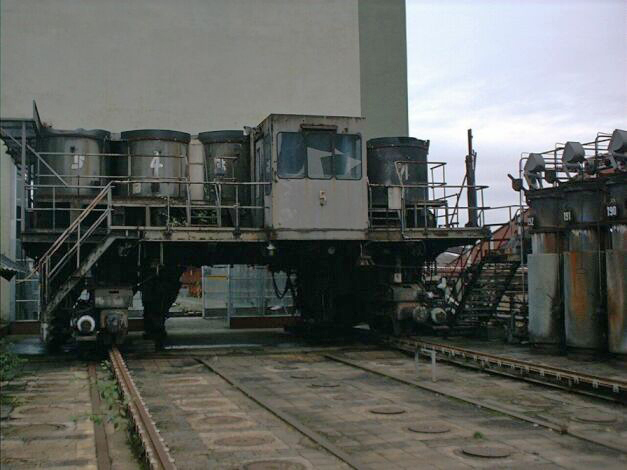
Enfourneuse for top-feeding.

=== Extinguishing coke ===
Coke needs to be cooled particularly quickly, because as soon as it comes into contact with ambient air, its extremely high temperature causes it to start burning.

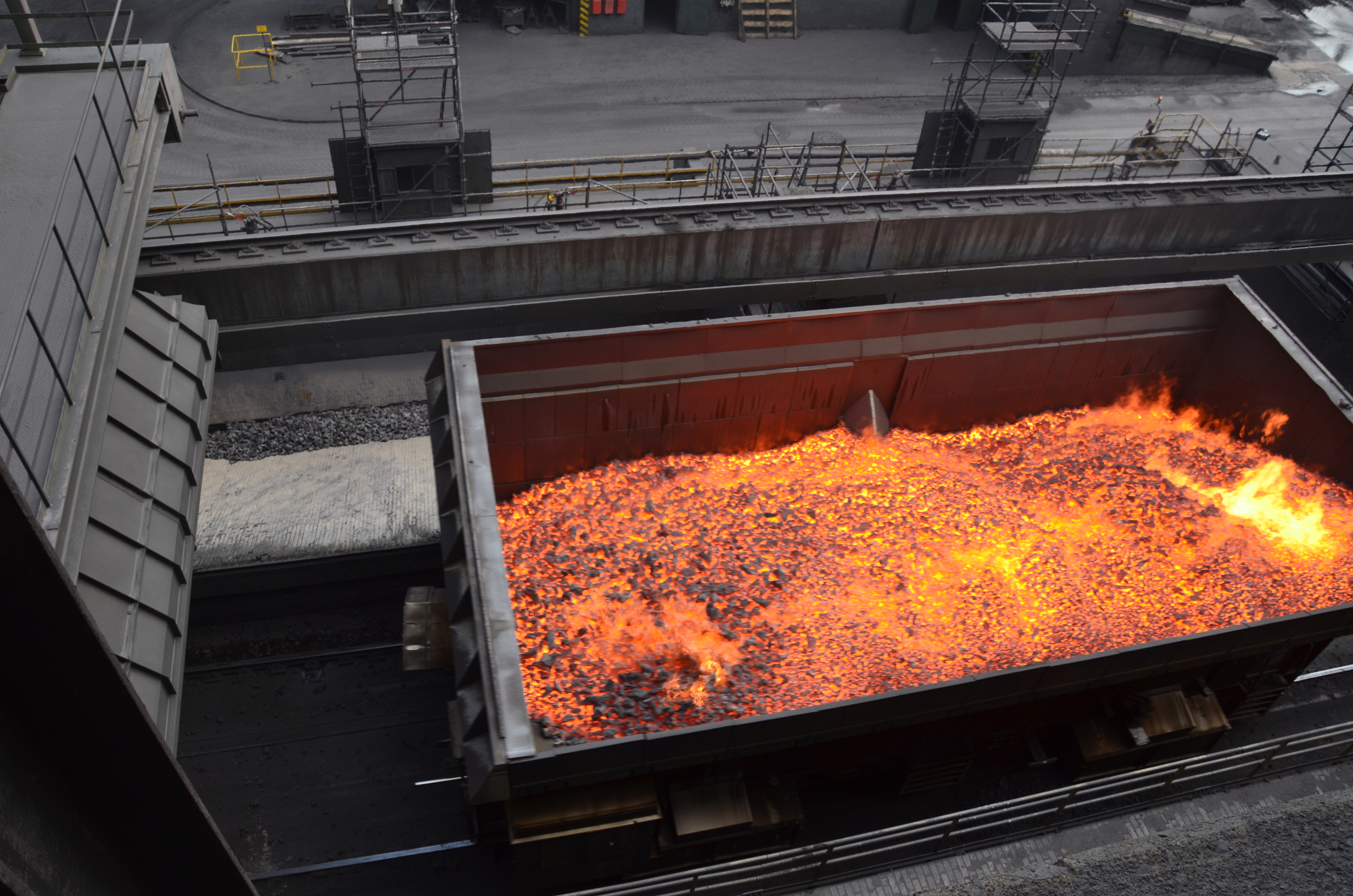
Glowing coke on its way to the cooler.

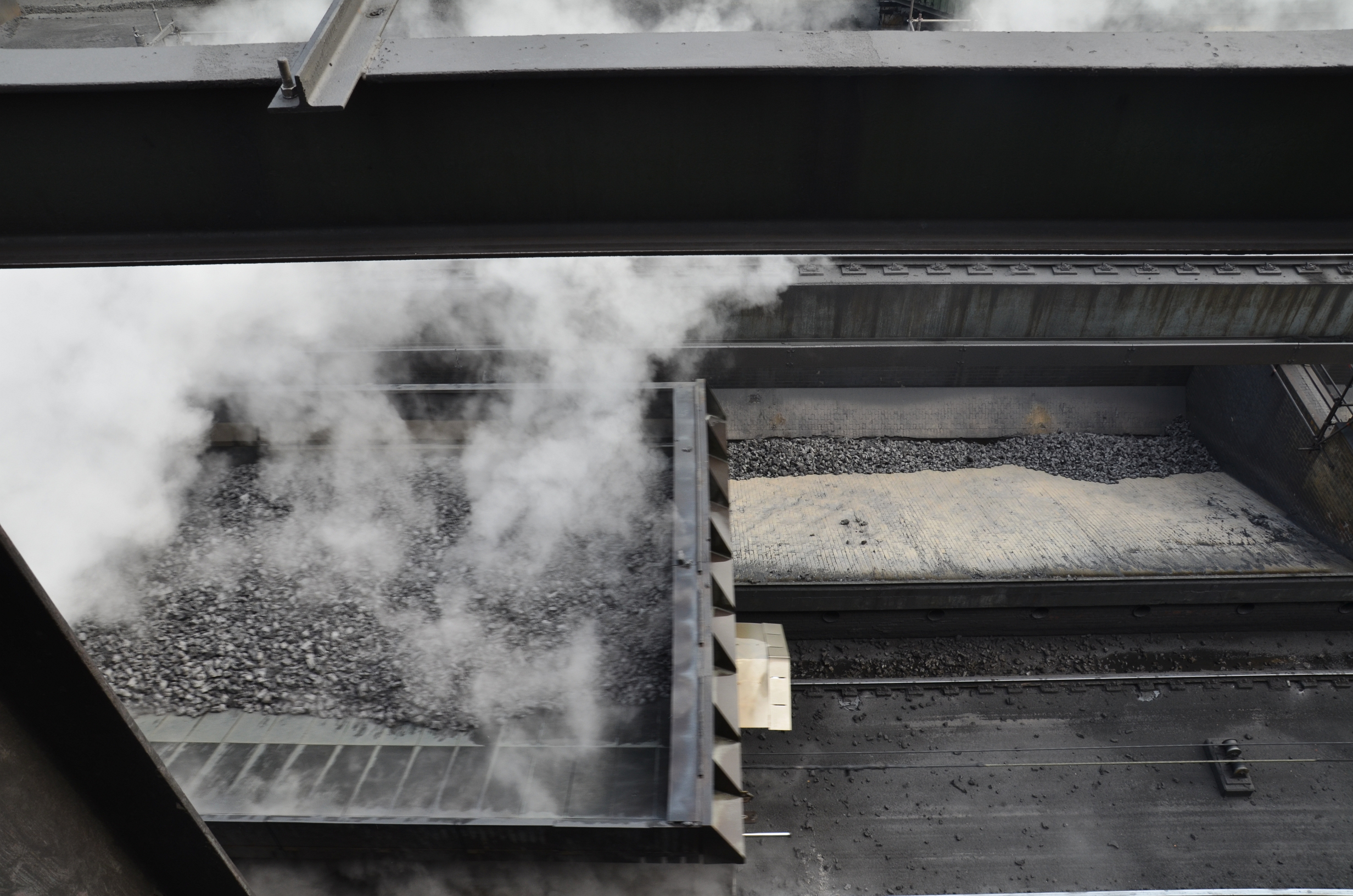
Wet quenching of coke.

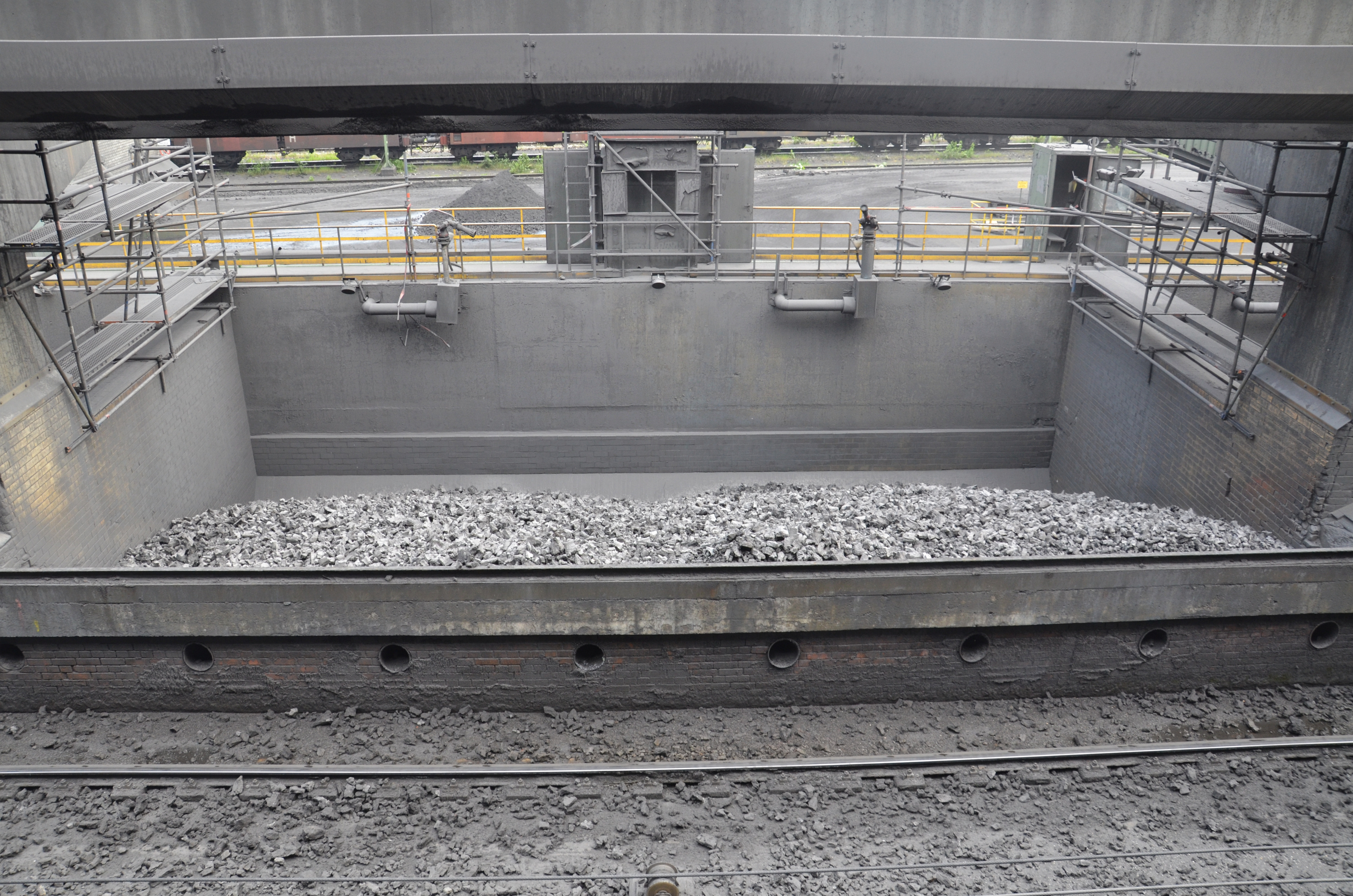
The extinguished coke is stored for some time in the hopper for quality control.

There are two ways of cooling coke:

==== Wet cooling ====
- This process requires approx. 2 m^{3} (71 ft^{3}) of water per tonne of coke;
- Heat is lost;
- Almost a third of the water dissipates as steam;
- Purification of this steam, contaminated with sulfuric acid, dust and water gases, remains a problem.

In 1986, between 0.2 and 2 kg (0.44 and 4.41 lb) of solid impurities were found per ton of coke during cooling. Thanks to the modern Coke Stabilizing Quenching process, this quantity has been reduced to 10 to 15 g/t (0.36 to 0.54 oz/long ton).

==== Dry cooling ====
This is usually carried out with liquid nitrogen, chosen as the inert gas.

- This technique saves energy;
- Avoids borrowing water from the natural environment;
- Releases less dust;
- As the final water content is lower, coke of superior quality is obtained;
- On the other hand, the process is costly in terms of investment and maintenance, an aspect disputed by some experts and contractors. This is particularly true of energy recovery, which reduces annual operating costs. In China, the world's second-largest steel producer, Nippon Steel Corporation estimates that its investments in dry cooling deliver savings of between 20% and 33%.

== The gas phase ==
Towards the middle of the 19th century, industrialists realized the value of off-gases for the chemical industry. The distillers used to wash the gases and separate their components were often mounted on the base of the furnace battery and connected by watertight pipes. The gases are drawn off by fans, which must maintain an overpressure of between 2 and 5 mbar (200 and 500 Pa) to avoid any risk of explosion in the furnace as a result of outside air entering. If the fan is blocked, a routine flaring is created.

The coal gas is cooled and washed in a scrubber; the condensation products are then separated and sent to various plants.

=== By-products ===
- Coal tar;
- Benzole;
- Sulfur;
- Ammonia;
- Ammonium sulfate, and more rarely ammonium nitrate (fertilizer);
- sulfuric acid;
- Alkaline phenols.

== Coking plants in the 21st century ==
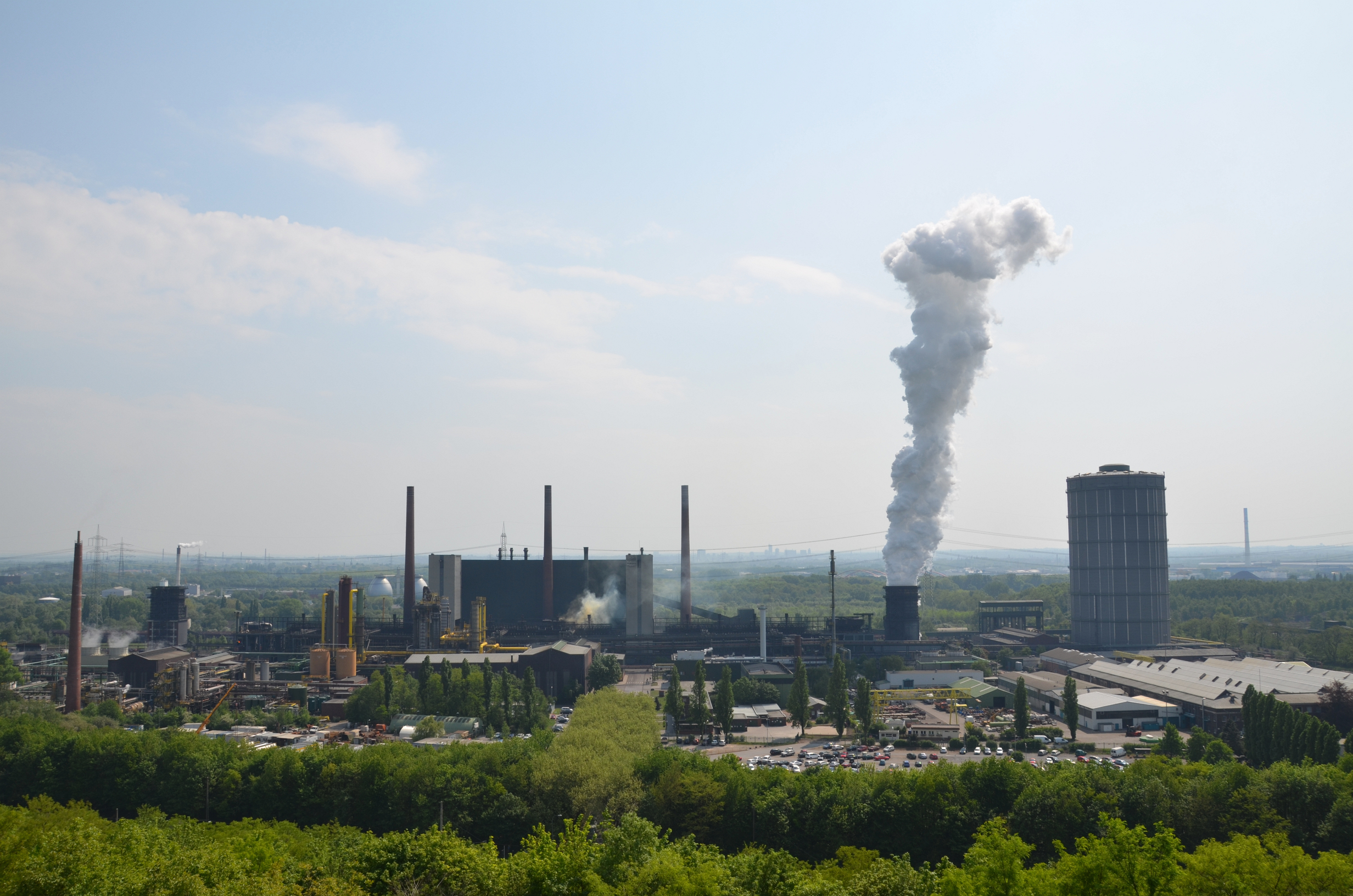
The Prosper coking plant with the steam plume emerging from its wet quenching tower.

Between 2002 and 2004, demand for steel caused the price of coke produced in China to soar from $80 to almost $350, more than quadrupling in price and three times higher than the simultaneous rise in the price of steel itself.

At the same time, the Chinese dismantled the modern Kaiserstuhl coking plant in Dortmund in the Ruhr and rebuilt it in China. Germany's last dry-cooling plant was unable to take up the slack, as the ThyssenKrupp group consolidated its iron and steel plants in Dortmund and Duisburg.

The last three coking plants in operation in the Ruhr – the ArcelorMittal Prosper coking plant in Bottrop, the Carbonaria / ThyssenKrupp coking plant in Duisburg-Schwelgern and the coking plant at the Duisburg-Huckingen thermal power station – have been at the limits of their capacity since 2010. On June 3, 2005, the Düsseldorf district authorities approved the extension of the Duisburg-Huckingen coking plant for HKM (Hüttenwerke Krupp Mannesmann) as being in the public interest, and this was confirmed on January 13, 2006. The coking plant was inaugurated on March 29, 2014.

In December 2005, approval was given for the upgrading of the Saarland central coking plant (Zentralkokerei Saar GmbH) in Dillingen. This involves the construction of an entirely new third furnace battery. This will eventually enable the operation of furnace battery 1 to be discontinued, which will be rebuilt. Battery 2 will be phased out.

In France, in November 2000, 6 coking plants were in operation: 3 owned by the Usinor steel group at Serémange, Dunkirk and Fos-sur-Mer, 2 owned by Charbonnages de France at Drocourt and Carling, and the suspended Pont-à-Mousson plant. In May 2020, following the closure of the Serémange coking plant, only the Dunkirk and Fos-sur-Mer plants will remain.

The coking plant in Carling was closed in October 2009 due to polychlorobiphenyl contamination and demolished completely by 2014.

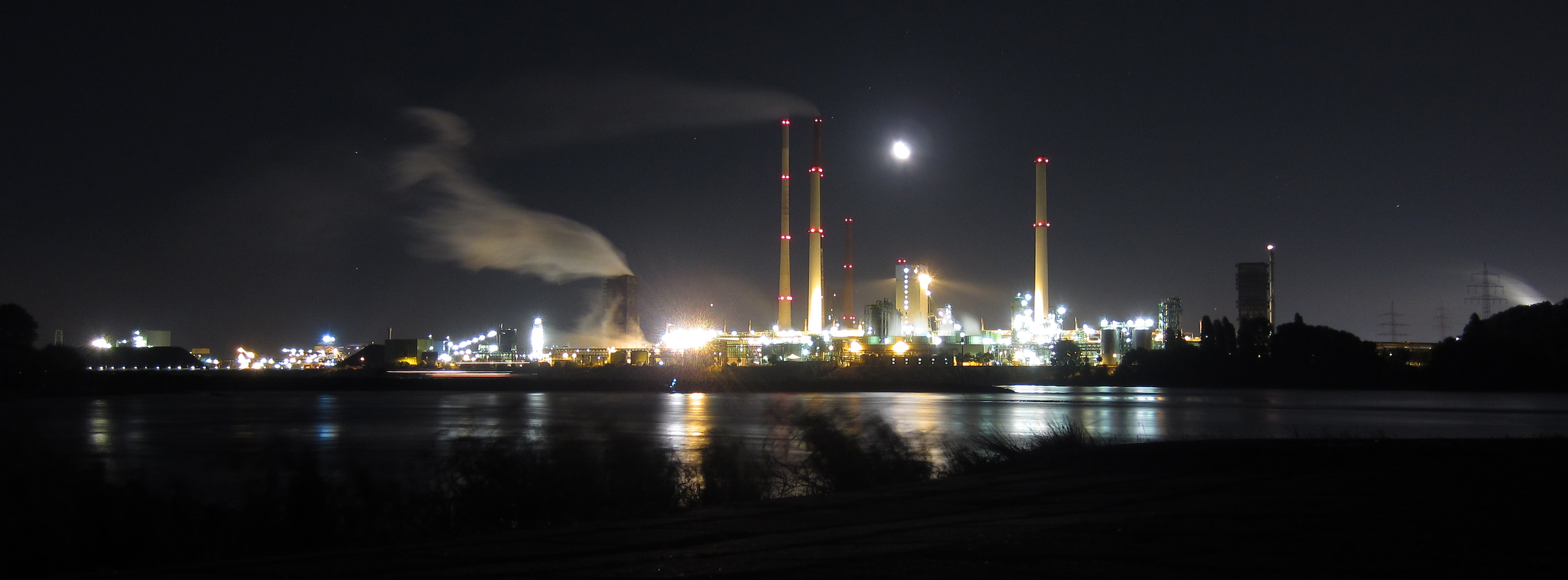
Coking plant Schwelgern GmbH.

== Industrial policy ==
Given the sustained rise in the price of coke, several supporters of the industry have represented to the German authorities that it would be profitable to reopen certain coal pits. For example, there is an entirely privately-funded project to open a mine north of Hamm, but the size of the investment makes this impossible. Skeptics fear that investment in this sector during the current economic cycle could have consequences for public finances in the event of a shortage.

== See also ==
- Air pollution
- Carbochemistry
- Coal
- Coal-mining region
- Coke (fuel)
- Mining district (Europe)
- Polycyclic aromatic hydrocarbon

== Bibliography ==
- Brückner, Horst (1938). Handbuch der Gasindustrie (in German). Munich et Berlin: R.Oldenbourg.
- Buschman, Walter (1998). Zechen und Kokereien im rheinischen Steinkohlenbergbau. Aachener Revier und westliches Ruhrgebiet (in German). Berlin: Mann. ISBN 3-7861-1963-5.
- Osses, Dietmar (2002). Kohle, Koks, Kultur. Die Kokereien der Zeche Zollverein (in German). Dortmund: Stiftung Industriedenkmalpflege und Geschichtskultur. ISBN 3-935783-09-4.
- Ress, Franz Michael (1957). Geschichte der Kokereitechnik (in German). Essen: Glückauf.
- Schreiber, Fritz (1911). Entwicklung und gegenwärtiger Stand der Kokereiindustrie Niederschlesiens (in German). Berlin: Springer.
- Farrenkopf, Michael (2003). Koks. Die Geschichte eines Wertstoffes (in German). Vol. 2. Bochum: Musée des mines d'Allemagne.
