= Staincross and Mapplewell railway station =

Former railway station in England

Staincross and Mapplewell
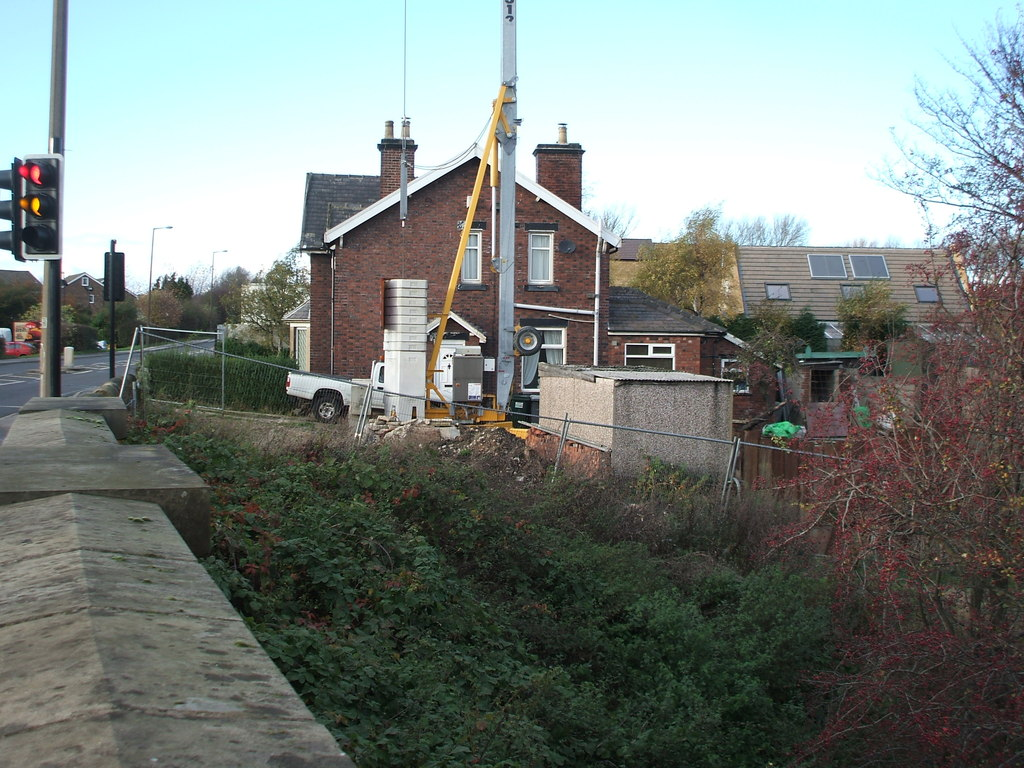
- Site of the former station (2009)

General information
- Location: Staincross, Barnsley; England
- Coordinates: 53.58339°N 1.48525°W
- Grid reference: SE341097
- Platforms: 2

Other information
- Status: Disused

History
- Original company: Barnsley Coal Railway

Key dates
- 1882: opened
- 1930: closed
Location

Staincross and Mapplewell railway station was one of three stations built on the Barnsley Coal Railway and opened when that line was completed in 1882. The station was situated adjacent to the main Wakefield road (A61), slightly to the east of Staincross, on the edge of the present day Athersley estate. It was about 1 mile east of Mapplewell. The station was situated between Stairfoot and Notton and Royston.

The railway arrived in the area with the opening of the first section of the Barnsley Coal Railway but the stations were opened, with the completion of the line on 1 September 1882. Staincross and Mapplewell consisted of two flanking platforms with access from the road bridge.

The station was closed on 22 September 1930. It is referred to as Staincross for Mapplewell in the July 1922 issue of Bradshaw's Railway Guide.
