= Ryhill railway station =

Former railway station in England

Ryhill

General information
- Location: Ryhill, City of Wakefield; England
- Coordinates: 53.6235°N 1.4256°W
- Grid reference: SE380142
- Platforms: 2

Other information
- Status: Disused

History
- Original company: Barnsley Coal Railway
- Pre-grouping: MS&LR, Great Central Railway
- Post-grouping: LNER

Key dates
- 1 September 1882: Opened
- 1 March 1927: Renamed
- 22 February 1930: Closed
Location

Ryhill railway station was situated on the Barnsley Coal Railway, later the Manchester, Sheffield and Lincolnshire Railway, Great Central and London and North Eastern Railway. It served the village of Ryhill in West Yorkshire, England.

== History ==
The station opened for passenger traffic on 1 September 1882. It was renamed Ryhill and Wintersett on 1 March 1927 and closed by the LNER on 22 February 1930.

The station consisted of two flanking wooden platforms with wooden buildings, the main buildings being on the Barnsley bound side, and a signal box just off the end of the Barnsley - bound platform. The platforms were linked by a standard footbridge.

Another station, Ryhill Halt, served the village on the Dearne Valley Railway from 1912 to 1951, about 1/2 mile (0.8 km) to the south-east.

== Accidents and incidents ==
- On 13 December 1911, a freight train was derailed at the station due to the locomotive crew being incapacitated.

Preceding station	Disused railways	Following station
Notton and Royston	Barnsley Coal Railway	Nostell
