= Royston, South Yorkshire =

Village in South Yorkshire, England

Coordinates: 53.61°N 1.45°W

Royston
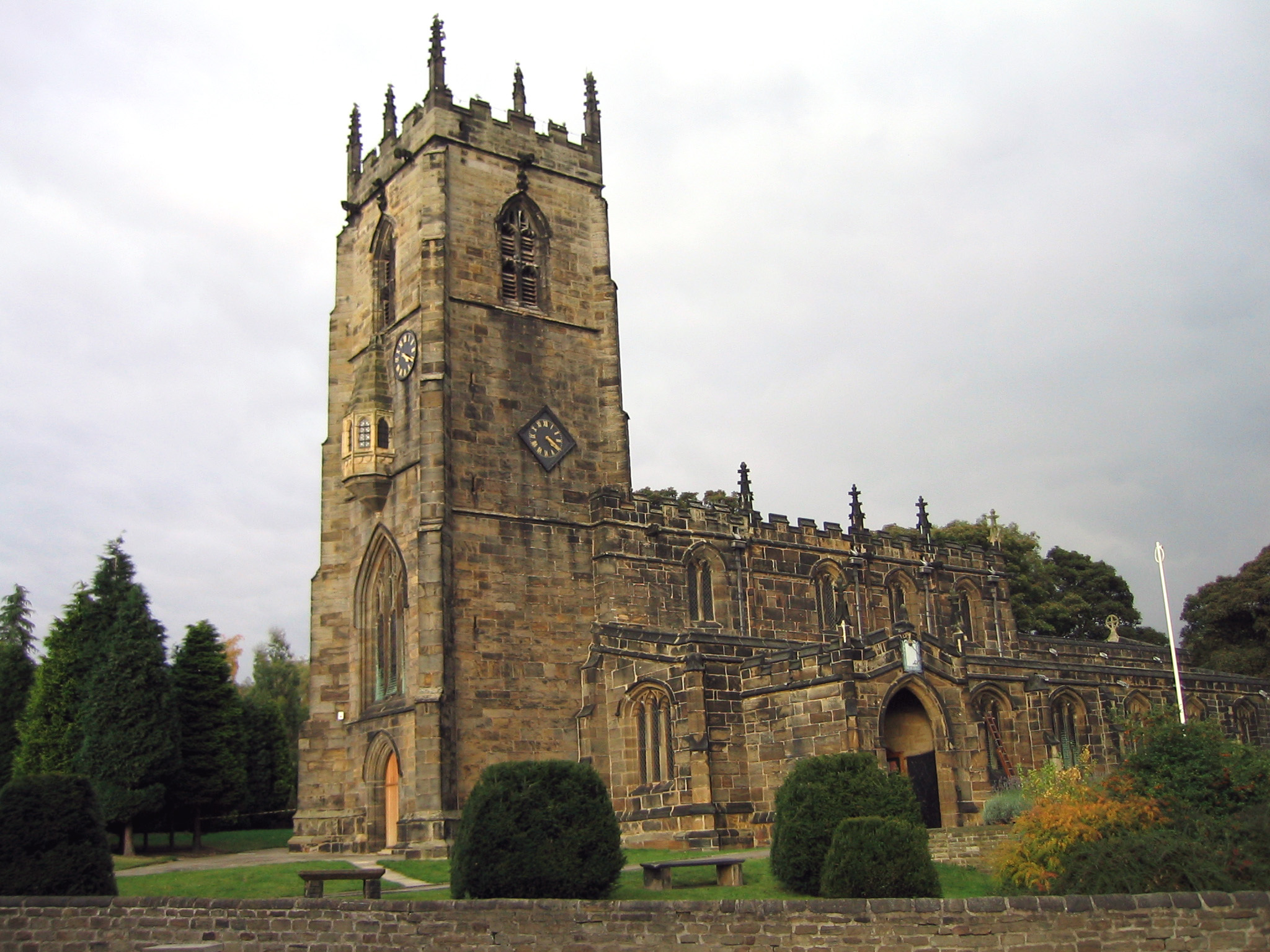
- Parish Church of St John the Baptist

- Location within South Yorkshire
- Population: 10,728 (2011 census)
- OS grid reference: SE3511
- Metropolitan borough: Barnsley
- Metropolitan county: South Yorkshire
- Region: Yorkshire and the Humber
- Country: England
- Sovereign state: United Kingdom
- Post town: BARNSLEY
- Postcode district: S71
- Dialling code: 01226
- Police: South Yorkshire
- Fire: South Yorkshire
- Ambulance: Yorkshire
- UK Parliament: Barnsley North

Royston is a village within the Metropolitan borough of Barnsley, in South Yorkshire, England. Historically, the village formed part of the West Riding of Yorkshire, but was incorporated into the Metropolitan borough of Barnsley in 1974 and is now on the border with West Yorkshire. It is part of the Barnsley Central borough constituency, and has a population of 10,728. It is situated 4 miles (6.4 km) north-east of Barnsley, and 6 miles (9.7 km) south-east of Wakefield.

== History ==
The village is recorded in the Domesday Book as Rorestone with the name deriving from Hror's or Roarr's farm /settlement (Hror/Roarr-s-tun). The village was in the wapentake of Staincross.

Originally a farming village, Royston joined the Industrial Revolution with the construction in the 1790s of the Barnsley Canal, and later a branch of the Midland Railway. Both are now disused.

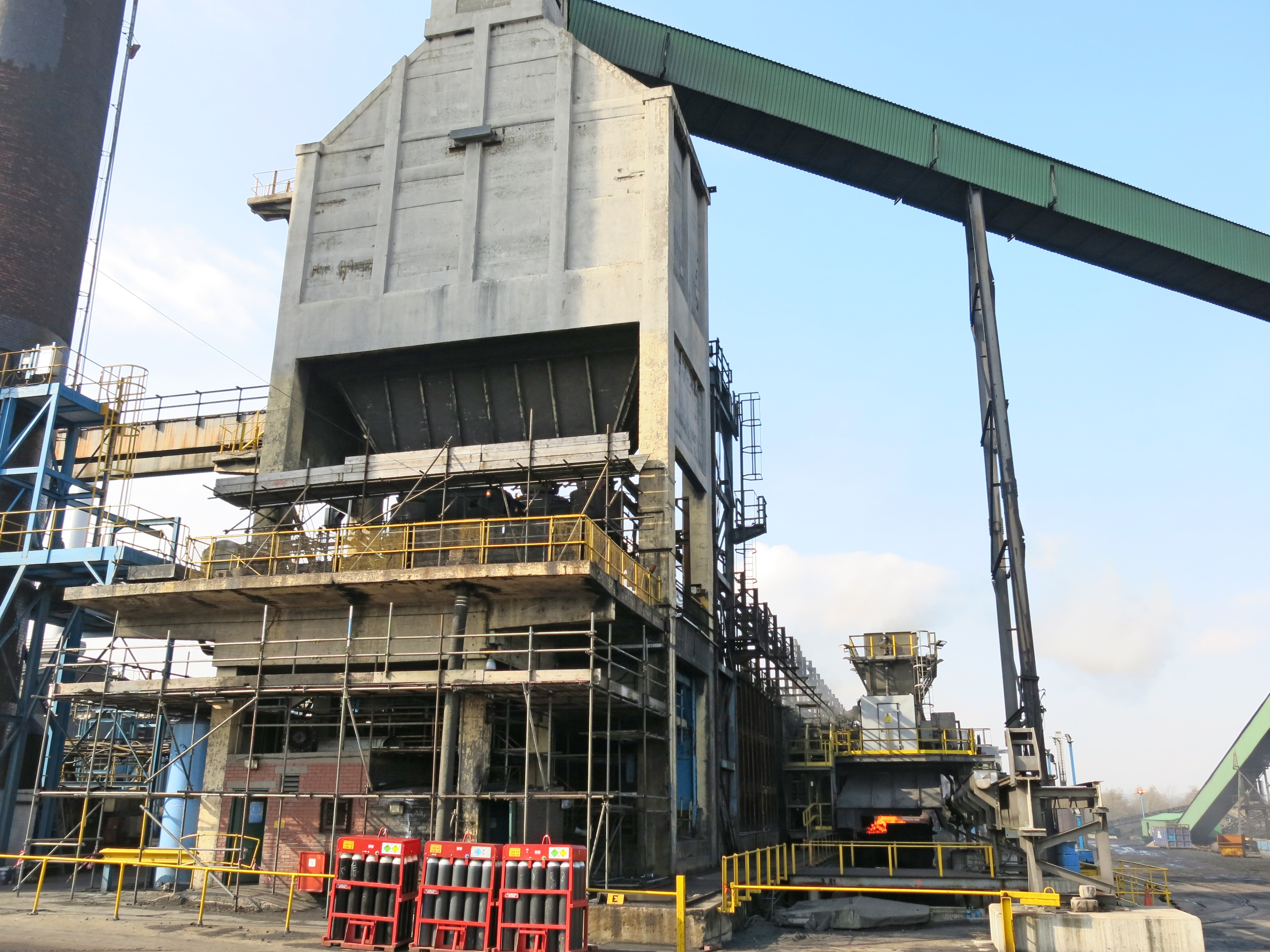
The Monckton Coke Works, at Royston, in operation discharging glowing coke from one of the bank of ovens on the left in 2013

A big source of employment for Royston was Monckton Colliery (1878–1966), although the pithead was just over the border into modern West Yorkshire. This was replaced by Royston Drift Mine. There was also, a clay works and brick works but these are all now closed, although a coke works operated until recently on the mine site processing coal brought in by road. Royston Drift Mine opened in 1975 and closed (after a relatively short period in coal mining terms) 14 years later in 1989. The site is now the site of Rabbit Ings Country Park, which is now home to all five species of owls to be found in Britain.

A large shirt factory with the brandname Valusta provided local employment from the 1940s through to the 1980s. Burberrys also had a factory on Midland Road

== Geography ==
Royston lies on the Barnsley Canal, and on the intersection of the B6132 and B6428 roads, due north of Monk Bretton at an elevation of around 246 feet (75 m) above sea level. The Trans Pennine Trail runs through Royston along the canal bank. The parish is part of the diocese of Leeds.

== Landmarks ==
The churches in Royston include the Anglican parish church of St John the Baptist, Bethel Church, the Royston Methodist Church, and Our Lady and St Joseph, a Roman Catholic church.

The parish church of St John the Baptist was built about the year 1234 and has a clock, a sundial, a ring of eight bells and is now grade I listed. The church is a notable location in Royston as it is one of a few churches in England with an oriel window, and was used a navigational landmark for guiding travellers.

== Notable people ==
Harry “Shake” Earnshaw was a miner turned racing cyclist who in 1938 was acclaimed the British Best All-Rounder. The comedian Charlie Williams was born in Royston in 1927. He played football for Doncaster Rovers and later found fame as one of the comedians on the TV programme The Comedians.

The mountaineer Andy Cave originates from Royston, and was a coal miner until the 1984–85 miners' strike, at which point he dedicated himself to mountaineering. He is also notable for his research into the dialect of Yorkshire pit villages. His 2001 doctorate stated that Royston had a slightly different accent to the surrounding villages, as many of the miners who came to work at Monckton Colliery on its opening travelled from the Black Country, where several mines had closed. This hypothesis was later tested by Kate Burland, who analysed certain vowel sounds in Royston, Wakefield and Barnsley. She found that Wakefield and Barnsley residents had very similar pronunciations for the sounds under consideration, whereas Royston residents had different pronunciations that were more similar to those associated with the Midlands. Yorkshire cricketer Norman Yardley lived in Royston at the Grove, which is now owned by Barnsley Metropolitan Borough Council.

Football player and manager Ernie Morgan was born in Royston.

== See also ==
- List of Yorkshire Pits
- Royston and Notton railway station (closed 1968)
- Notton and Royston railway station (closed 1930).
- Listed buildings in Royston, South Yorkshire
