= Notton and Royston railway station =

Former railway station in England

Notton and Royston
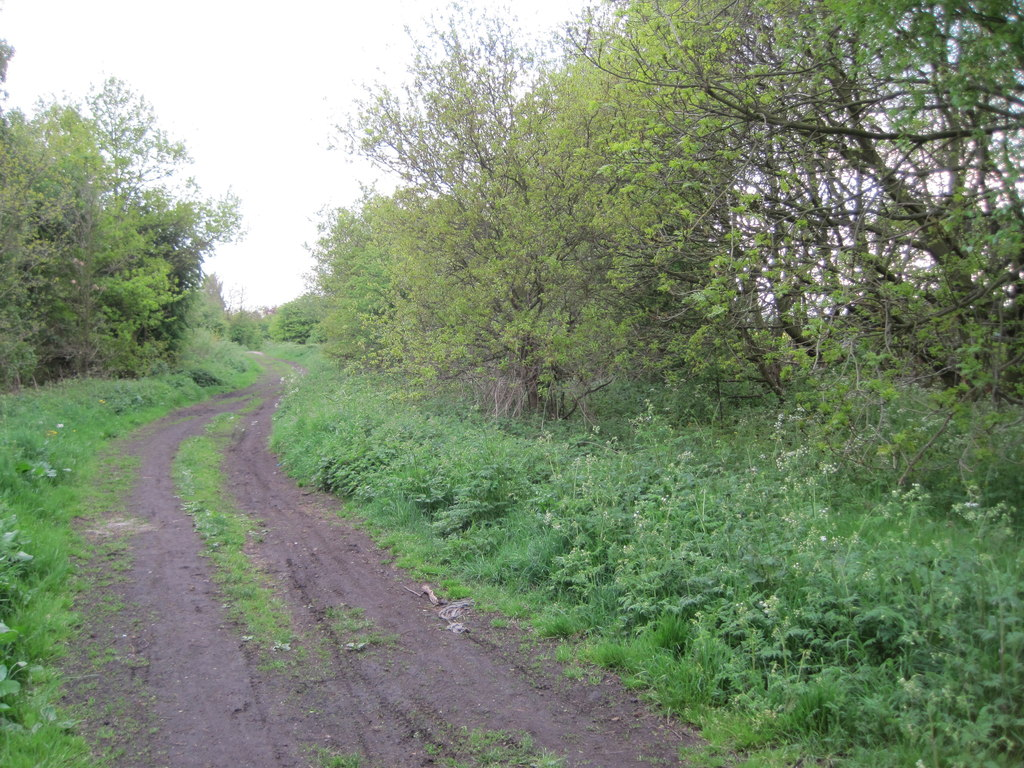
- The site of the station in 2013

General information
- Location: Royston, Barnsley; England
- Coordinates: 53.606482°N 1.458158°W
- Grid reference: SE359123
- Platforms: 2

Other information
- Status: Disused

Key dates
- 1882: opened
- 1930: closed
Location

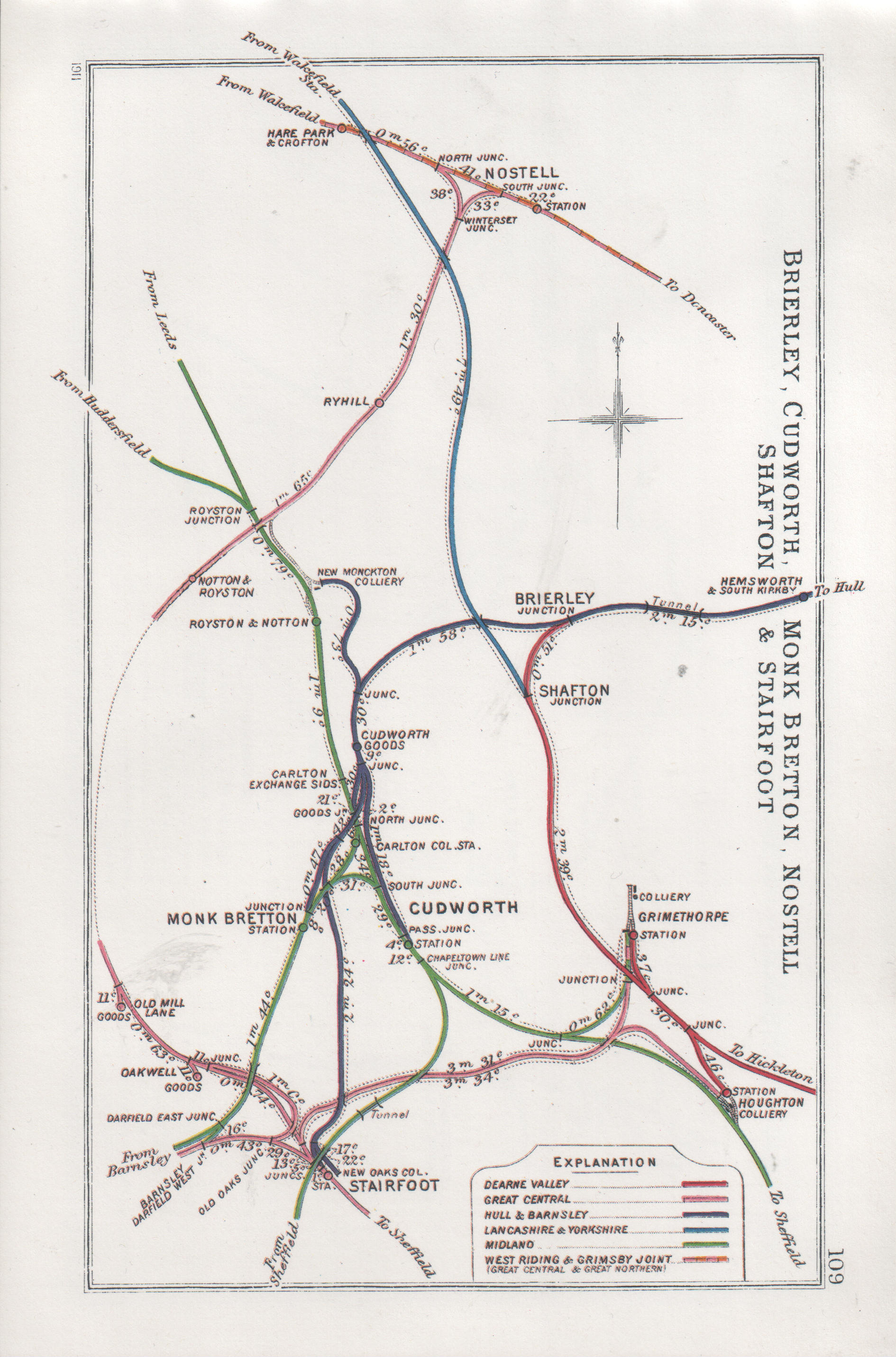
Railway Clearing House diagram showing Notton and Royston in 1911

Notton and Royston railway station was a railway station that served the village of Royston, South Yorkshire, England. It was situated on the Barnsley Coal Railway between Staincross and Mapplewell and Ryhill.

The first section of the line to open was that from Stairfoot to Applehaigh (just north of Notton and Royston station) in 1870 so that Rosa Colliery could be served. The station opened, along with two others on the line, on 1 September 1882, and was closed to passengers by the LNER on 22 September 1930.

It had flanking platforms and simple buildings to house all the facilities constructed in wood.

Preceding station	Disused railways	Following station
Staincross	Barnsley Coal Railway	Ryhill
