= Barnsley Coal Railway =

Railway line in England

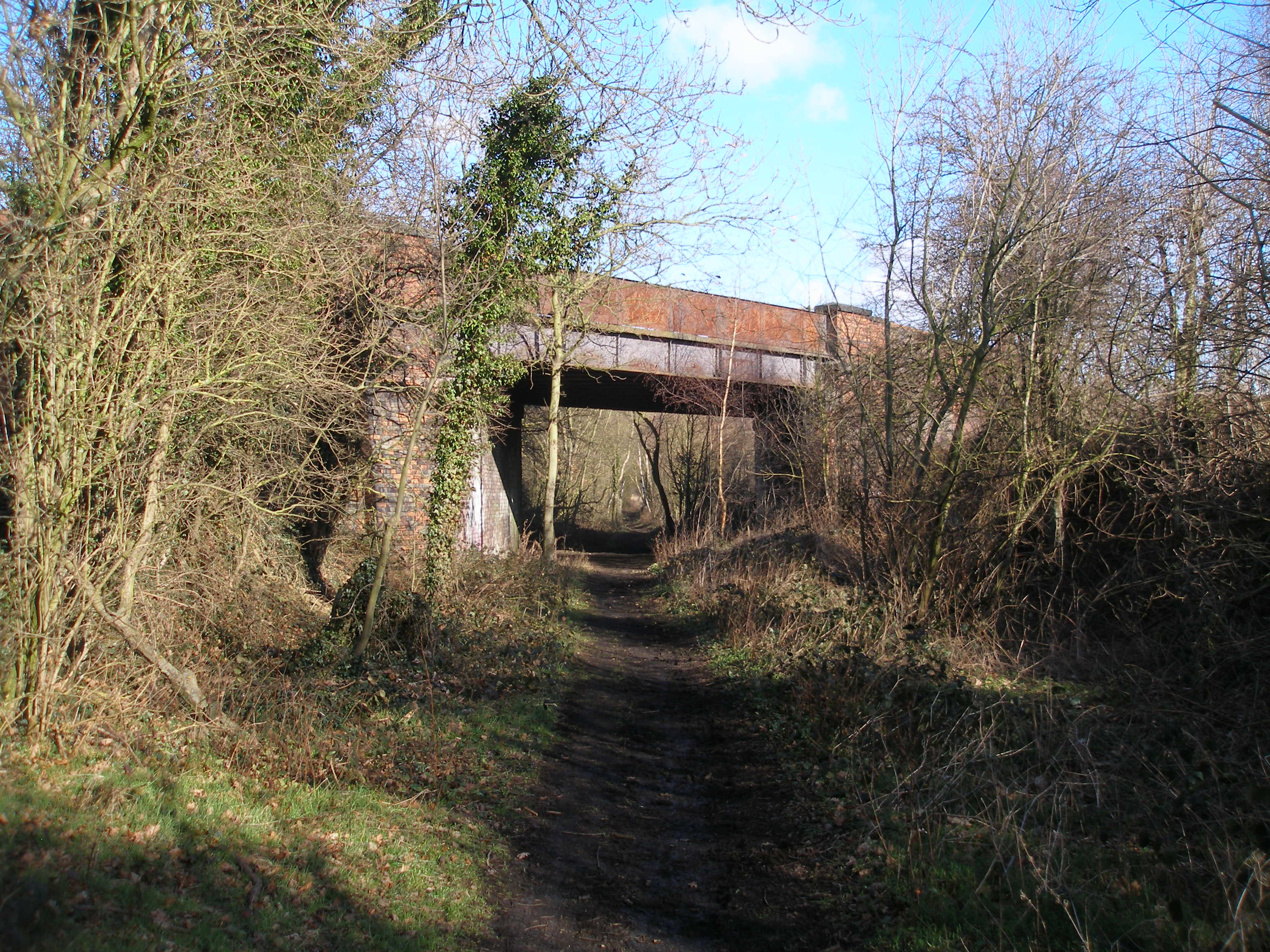
Former trackbed under Back Lane, east of Wintersett. (2012)

The Barnsley Coal Railway was a short railway which, when fully opened, ran between Stairfoot Junction, on the Mexborough to Barnsley line of the South Yorkshire Railway (SYR) and a triangular junction at Nostell on the line of the West Riding and Grimsby Railway (WR&GR).

The railway rights were purchased by the SYR in July 1863, just one year before that company was absorbed into the Manchester, Sheffield and Lincolnshire Railway.

Scheduled passenger services on the lined ended in 1930, and goods services in 1961.

== History ==
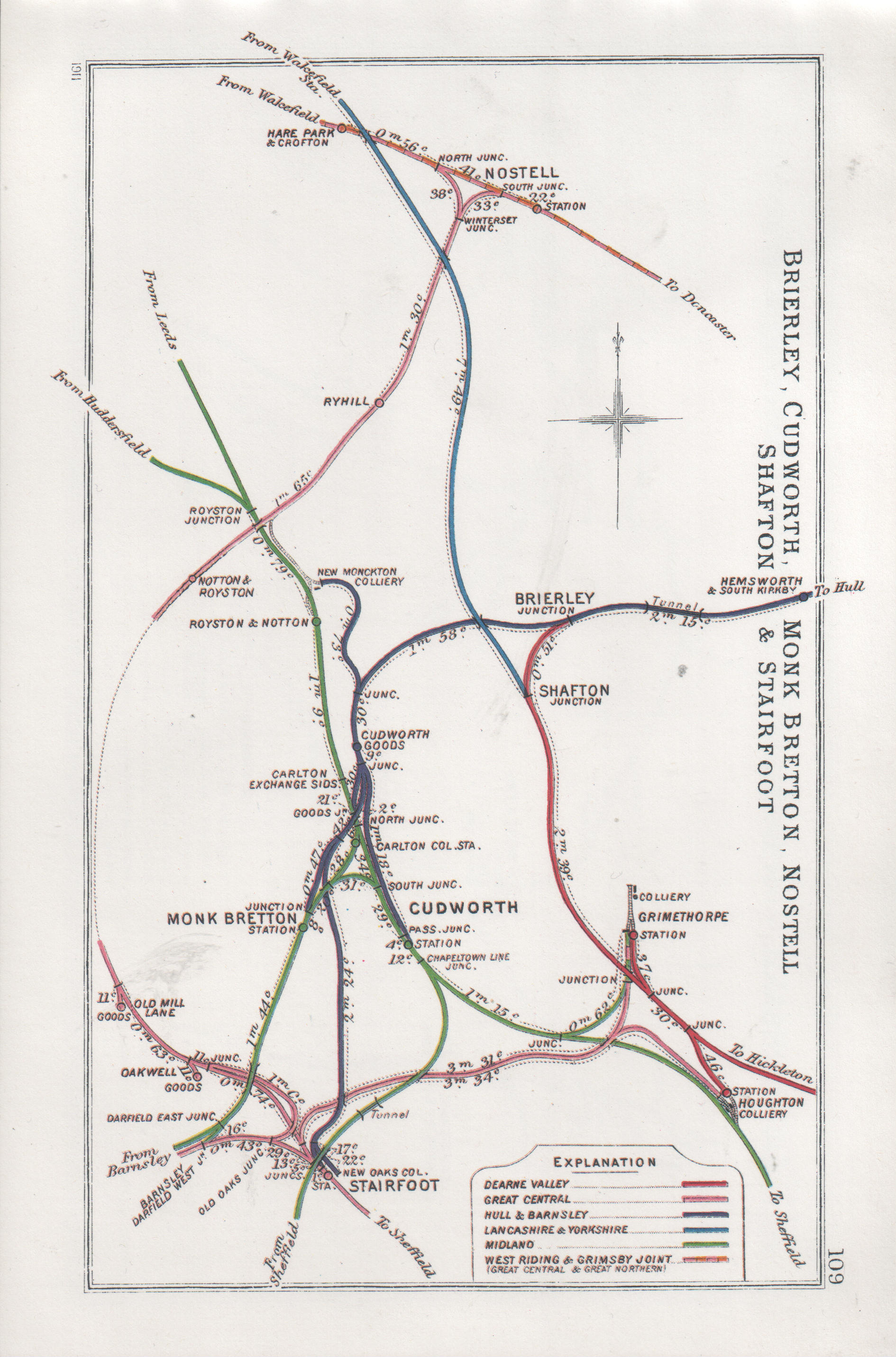
Railway Clearing House diagram of 1911 showing the line

Barnsley Coal Railway Act 1861
- Act of Parliament
- Parliament of the United Kingdom
- Long title: An Act to authorize the Construction of a Railway in the West Riding of Yorkshire, to be called "The Barnsley Coal Railway."
- Citation: 24 & 25 Vict. c. clxv
- Territorial extent: United Kingdom

Dates
- Royal assent: 22 July 1861

Other legislation
- Relates to: Dearne and Dove Canal Act 1793

In the parliamentary session of 1860–61 an act was applied for to incorporate a company, and construct a line from a junction with the South Yorkshire Railway (SYR) west of Ardsley railway station to Crigglestone. The Barnsley Coal Railway Act 1861 (24 & 25 Vict. c. clxv) was passed, allowing the creation of the Barnsley Coal Railway, with £40,000 of capital allowed to be raised by share issue, and £13,000 by loans. The first permitted section of line was from Stairfoot (west of Ardsley in Darfield) to Applehaigh (in Notton), 4 miles (6.4 km) long.

The South Yorkshire Railway Act 1863 (26 & 27 Vict. c. 146) was passed allowing the South Yorkshire Railway, which had subscribed £10,000 of the railway's capital, to take over the company.

The South Yorkshire Railway Act 1864 (27 & 28 Vict. c. 19) was obtained allowing a short 1 1/4-mile (2 km) extension to the Midland Railway's line near Barnsley; the new chord would have enabled the South Yorkshire company to take advantage of their recently acquired running powers to Wakefield and Leeds over the Midland's lines. This connecting line was not built.

The first section of line served Rosa Colliery, and opened to traffic in January 1870.

In the session of 1873–74 the SYR's successor the Manchester, Sheffield and Lincolnshire Railway (MS&LR) obtained powers in the Manchester, Sheffield and Lincolnshire Railway Act 1874 (37 & 38 Vict. c. 132) to build an extension from near the 1860s terminus at Notton, to a two way junction with the West Riding and Grimsby Railway north-west of Nostel station; also sought were powers for a junction from the line to the Midland's line near to the Barnsley Canal; (Note: North-west of Royston and Notton railway station, and at the site of the (future) Royston junction.) and a second junction from Coal railway to SYR's Barnsley line, creating an extended triangular junction to that line.

The second section was opened for goods traffic in August 1882. This section ran from Applehaigh to a triangular junction with the West Riding and Grimsby Railway (WR&GR) at Nostell. The line included passenger stations at Staincross and Mapplewell, Notton and Royston and Ryhill, later renamed Ryhill and Wintersett. A passenger service commenced on 1 September 1882.

Regular passenger services were withdrawn in 1930, goods services in 1961.

=== Train services ===
The passenger service on the line was part of a Leeds Central to Barnsley Court House service via Wakefield Westgate. The July 1922 issue of Bradshaw's Railway Guide shows five trains in each direction on Mondays to Fridays, six trains on Saturday from Barnsley to Leeds and seven on Saturday from Leeds to Barnsley. There was no Sunday service.
