= Monckton Coke Works =

Former coking plant in South Yorkshire, England

Coordinates: 53.6029°N 1.4350°W

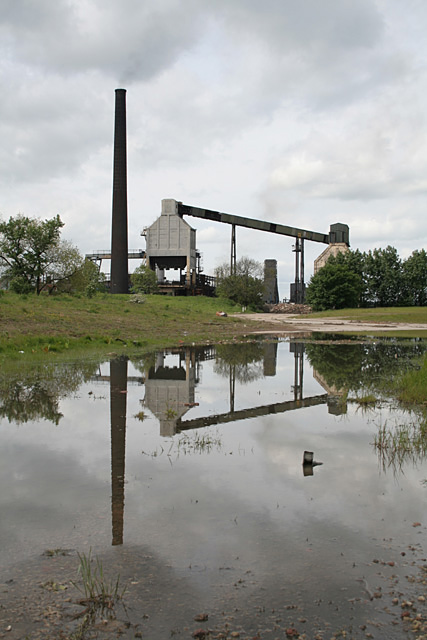
- Monckton Coking Plant
- Industry: Coal
- Founded: 1884
- Defunct: 2014
- Fate: Defunct
- Headquarters: Royston, Barnsley, England
- Products: Coke
- Owner: Hargreaves
- Number of employees: 120 (2014)

Monckton Coke Works (formerly the Monckton Coke and Chemical Company Ltd) was a coking plant near Royston in South Yorkshire, England. The plant opened in 1884 and was closed 130 years later in 2014, being one of the last remnants of the coal industry in Yorkshire. In the 21st century, it was known as being the last independent coke works in the United Kingdom. For many years it was known for its high-quality coking coal, even being exported to coal-rich South Africa for use in steelmaking. However, in 2013/2014, the market was swamped with cheap imports from the Far East, spelling the demise of Monckton due to it being uneconomical.

== History ==
Several collieries were sunk from 1875 onwards between the towns of Royston and South Hiendley, in South Yorkshire England. A coking plant was built in 1874 to provide coking coal from the adjacent local collieries (typically those known by the name Monckton, and later, New Monckton). In 1901, the company was registered as Monckton Coke and Chemical Company Ltd and was a subsidiary of New Monckton Collieries and operated 180 beehive ovens. Between 1976 and 1979, the site was rebuilt with 42 ovens, which operated continuously as opposed to the beehive types that they replaced. These ovens stayed in use until is closure in 2014. In 1994, RJB Mining purchased the site from ICI for £4.7 million, and fed the plant with coal from the Clipstone Colliery in Nottinghamshire.

Coal was dropped from an overhead loader into the ovens below and roasted for 20 hours. This produced the coking coal, but the company also sold the ammonia, tar and benzole, which were byproducts of the coking process. Coke Oven Gas (COG) was sold to a local glass manufacturer, but when this supply ceased, the COG was burnt on site as part of a 12.7 megawatt steam condenser turbine which fed steam back into the coking process, with excess electricity being sold into the National Grid.

By 1999, Monckton was one of three coke works left in Britain, still operating independently of major steelworks which had their coke ovens on site. The Cwm Coking plant at Llantwit Fardre, was closed in 2002, and the Coalite plant, in Derbyshire, had closed by 2004. Hargreaves, a company whose interests include the mining and importation of coal, bought the site from UK Coal (Note: RJB Mining became UK Coal in 2001.) for £12 million in 2005.

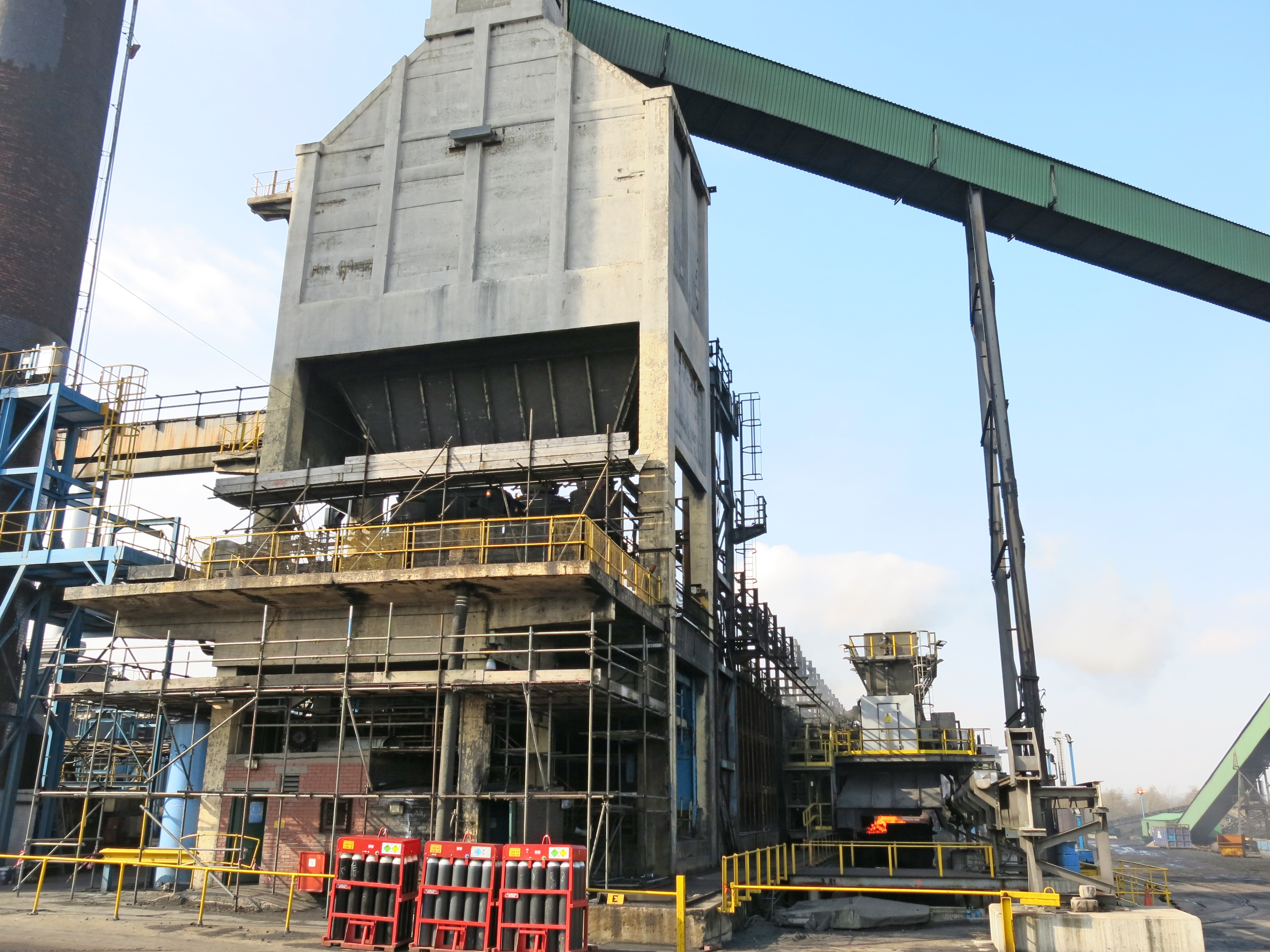
The Monckton Coke Works in operation discharging glowing coke from one of the bank of ovens on the left in 2013

The main output of the works was coking coal used in the metallurgical industries. Most was destined for customers outside of the United Kingdom; in the 1990s, when RJB Mining took over the concern, coke was exported to Norway. A contract with a company in South Africa, saw the company exporting over 100,000 tonnes (110,000 tons) a year between 2010 and 2014. Some of the coke was destined for the domestic house-fire market and was sold under the branded names of “Sunbrite”, “Monckton Boiler Beans” or "Cosycoke".

In the 20th century, the plant was consuming an average of 790 tonnes (870 tons) of coal and producing 535 tonnes (590 tons) of coke and 9,700,000 cubic feet (276,000 m^{3}) of Coke Oven Gas (COG) every day. This averaged out to be about 200,000 tonnes (220,000 tons) of coke per year. From 2006, the company burnt waste tyres as part of its coking process, whilst receiving financial benefits from the re-use of old tyres. Each oven took 15.5 tonnes (17.1 tons) of coal and baked it at 1,280 °C (2,340 °F) for 20 hours which yielded 11 tonnes (12 tons) of coke.

Nearby collieries supplied raw coal to the plant until the 1960s, with coal also being railed in from Grimethorpe and Clipstone collieries when the Monckton and Royston mines were closed down. Latterly, Maltby Main Colliery was owned by various concerns with the final owners, Hargreaves, also owning Monckton Coke Works. Maltby produced over 1,000,000 tonnes (1,100,000 tons) of coal a year, of which 25% went to Monckton (the other 75% was used in the power generating industry, typically being sent to Drax Power Station). Maltby was closed in 2013, with the closure of Monckton following a year later. During 2014, coal was sourced from other locations owned by Hargreaves.

Monckton had been operating for 130 years when it was closed and had been known as the last independent coking plant in Britain; other coking plants were located on steelworks specifically tailored to the output of the steel making plants. Closure of the plant was brought about by cheaper imports of coke from the Far East being available on the open market.

Mothballing the site was not an option for Hargreaves as when the refractory bricks in the ovens cool, they crack and need to be replaced. Hargreaves spent several million pounds remediating the site, though employees of the company still operate out of the site, though not in connection with coal or coke production. The company have stated an interest in building houses on the site.

== Incidents ==
In 1880, a boy, Oliver Wilson, who was working at the coke plant, was sent up to the top of one of the ovens to look out for another boy who had not been seen for some time. Whilst he was on top of the oven, another worker at ground level set the mechanism to allow coal to be fed into the top of the oven by gravity. Wilson fell into the oven and was buried by coal in the oven. He suffocated before he could be rescued.
