= Minersville Coke Ovens =

- U.S. National Register of Historic Places
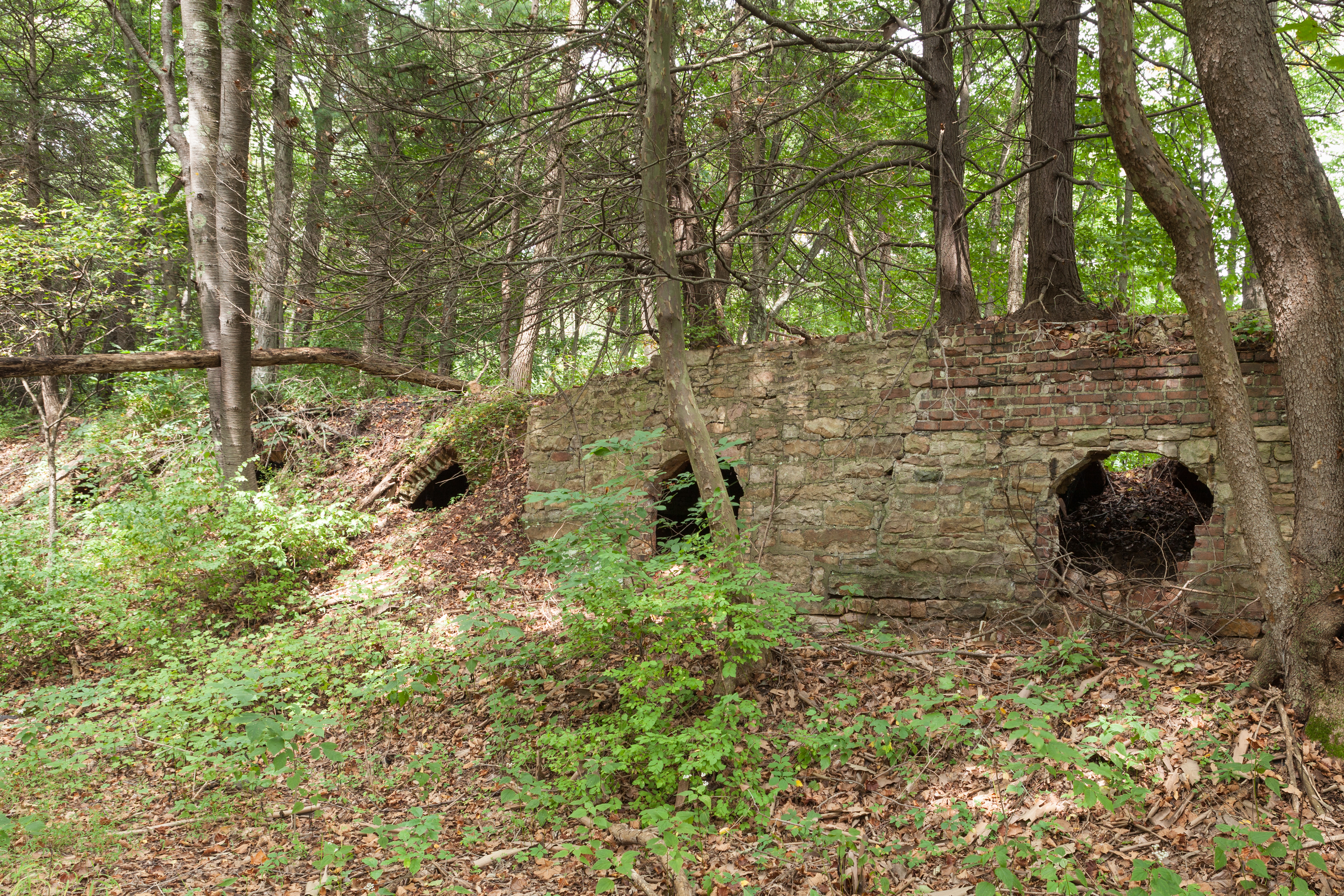
- Looking west down a line of coke ovens, the ruins in September 2014

- Location within Pennsylvania Location within the United States
- Nearest city: Pennsylvania Route 913, 1 mile (1.6 km) east of Coalmont, Carbon Township, Pennsylvania
- Coordinates: 40°13′00″N 78°11′03″W
- Area: 13 acres (5.3 ha)
- Built: 1875
- MPS: Industrial Resources of Huntingdon County, 1780--1939 MPS
- NRHP reference No.: 90000401
- Added to NRHP: March 20, 1990

The Minersville Coke Ovens is an historic coke oven site in Carbon Township in Huntingdon County, Pennsylvania, United States.

It was listed on the National Register of Historic Places in 1990.

== History and architectural features ==
This property includes the remains of beehive and Mitchell coke ovens, the pillars and remains of the tipple, the foundation remains of the supply house, an engine and power house, a substation and hoist house, a blacksmith and machine shop, the railroad rights of way, and the Gordon Mine. In 1925, the property had ninety beehive ovens and sixty-seven uncompleted Mitchell ovens.
