= Carbon Township, Pennsylvania =

Township in Pennsylvania, US

Coordinates: 40°13′27″N 78°10′44″W

- Township
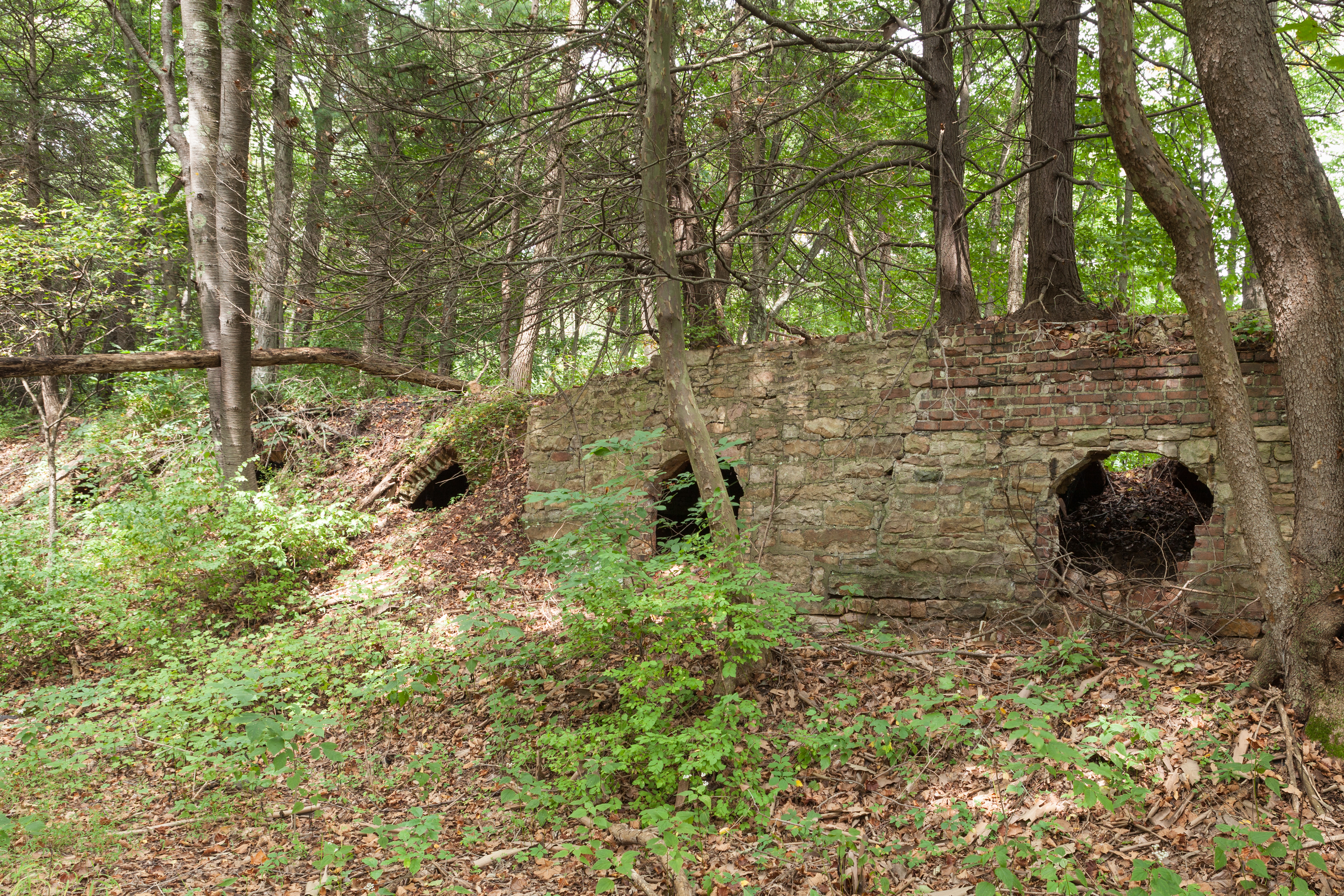
- Minersville Coke Ovens

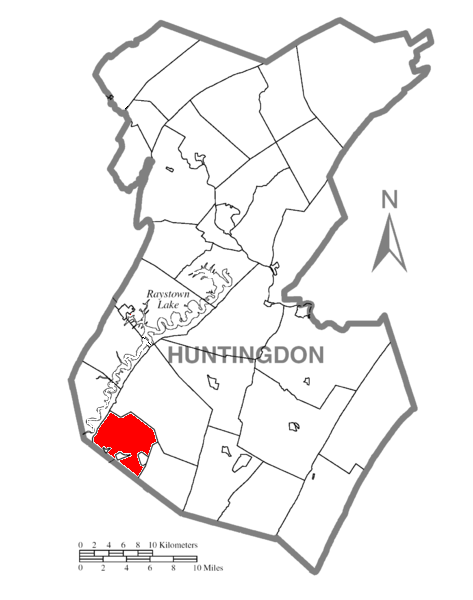
- Map of Huntingdon County, Pennsylvania Highlighting Carbon Township

- Map of Huntingdon County, Pennsylvania
- Country: United States
- State: Pennsylvania
- County: Huntingdon

Area
  - Total: 18.58 sq mi (48.13 km^{2})
  - Land: 18.58 sq mi (48.13 km^{2})
  - Water: 0 sq mi (0.00 km^{2})

Population (2020)
  - Total: 316▼
  - Estimate (2022): 314
  - Density: 19.6/sq mi (7.56/km^{2})
- Time zone: UTC-5 (Eastern (EST))
  - Summer (DST): UTC-4 (EDT)
- FIPS code: 42-061-11208

Carbon Township is a township in Huntingdon County, Pennsylvania, United States. As of the 2020 census, the township population was 316.

== History ==
The Minersville Coke Ovens was listed on the National Register of Historic Places in 1990.

== Geography ==
According to the United States Census Bureau, the township has a total area of 18.6 square miles (48 km^{2}), all land.

== Demographics ==
Historical population
Census	Pop.	Note	%±
2000	428		—
2010	375		−12.4%
2020	316		−15.7%
2022 (est.)	314		−0.6%
U.S. Decennial Census

As of the census of 2000, there were 428 people, 167 households, and 120 families residing in the township. The population density was 23.0 people per square mile (8.9/km^{2}). There were 201 housing units at an average density of 10.8/sq mi (4.2/km^{2}). The racial makeup of the township was 97.90% White, 0.93% African American, 0.23% Native American, 0.47% Asian, and 0.47% from two or more races. Hispanic or Latino of any race were 0.23% of the population.

There were 167 households, out of which 31.1% had children under the age of 18 living with them, 58.7% were married couples living together, 7.8% had a female householder with no husband present, and 28.1% were non-families. 25.7% of all households were made up of individuals, and 10.2% had someone living alone who was 65 years of age or older. The average household size was 2.56 and the average family size was 3.06.

In the township the population was spread out, with 23.6% under the age of 18, 7.7% from 18 to 24, 31.3% from 25 to 44, 25.5% from 45 to 64, and 11.9% who were 65 years of age or older. The median age was 38 years. For every 100 females there were 107.8 males. For every 100 females age 18 and over, there were 112.3 males.

The median income for a household in the township was $31,932, and the median income for a family was $41,429. Males had a median income of $26,875 versus $20,833 for females. The per capita income for the township was $17,222. About 6.8% of families and 11.7% of the population were below the poverty line, including 10.7% of those under age 18 and 22.2% of those age 65 or over.
