= Coke (fuel) =

Coal product used in the process of making steel

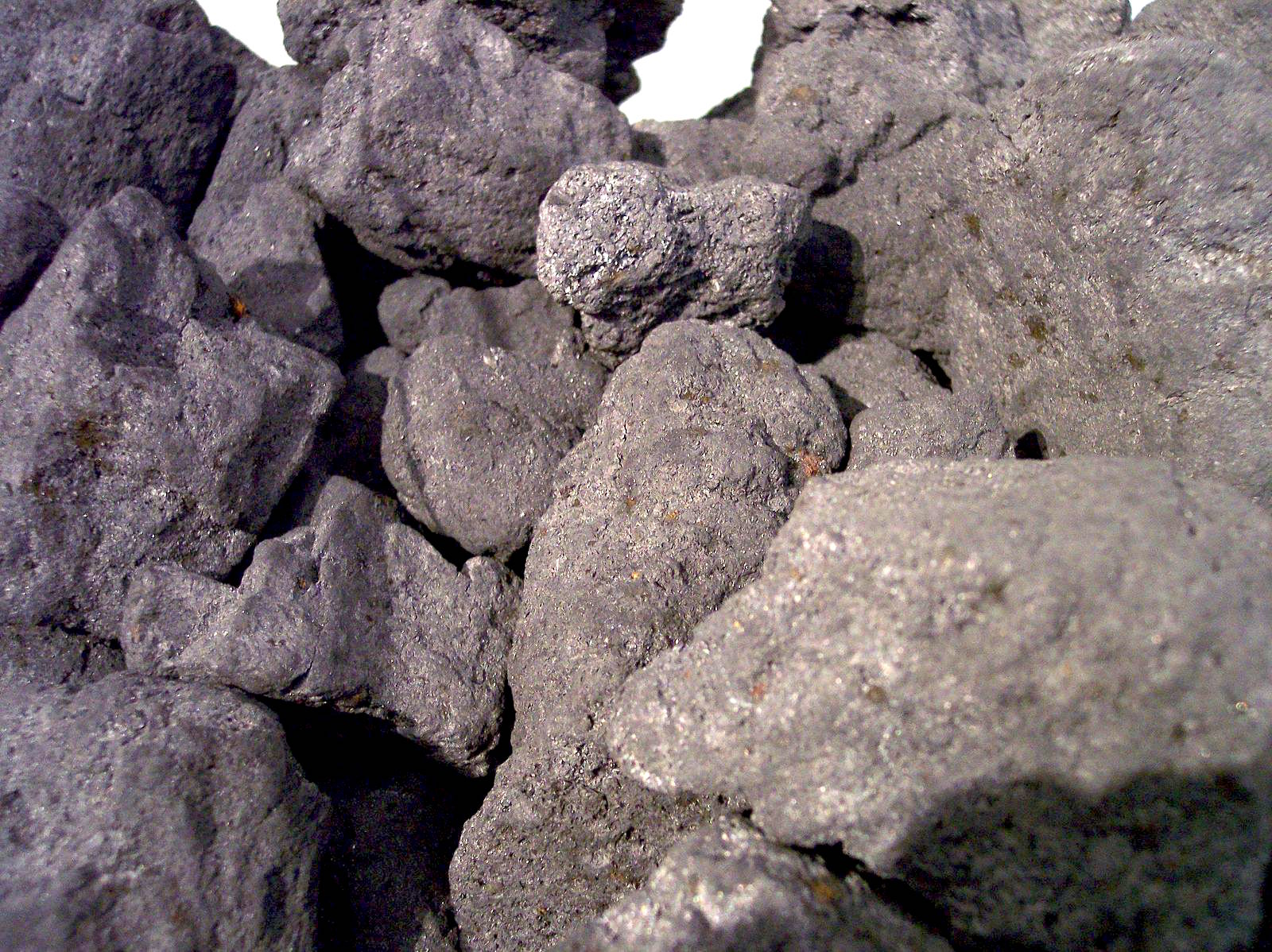
Raw coke

Coke is a grey, hard, and porous coal-based fuel with a high carbon content. It is made by heating coal or petroleum in the absence of air. Coke is an important industrial product, used mainly in the smelting of iron ore, but also as a fuel in stoves and forges.

The unqualified term "coke" usually refers to the product derived from low-ash and low-sulphur bituminous coal by a process called coking. A similar product called petroleum coke, or pet coke, is obtained from crude petroleum in petroleum refineries. Coke may also be formed naturally by geologic processes. It is the residue of a destructive distillation process.

== Production ==
=== Industrial coke furnaces ===
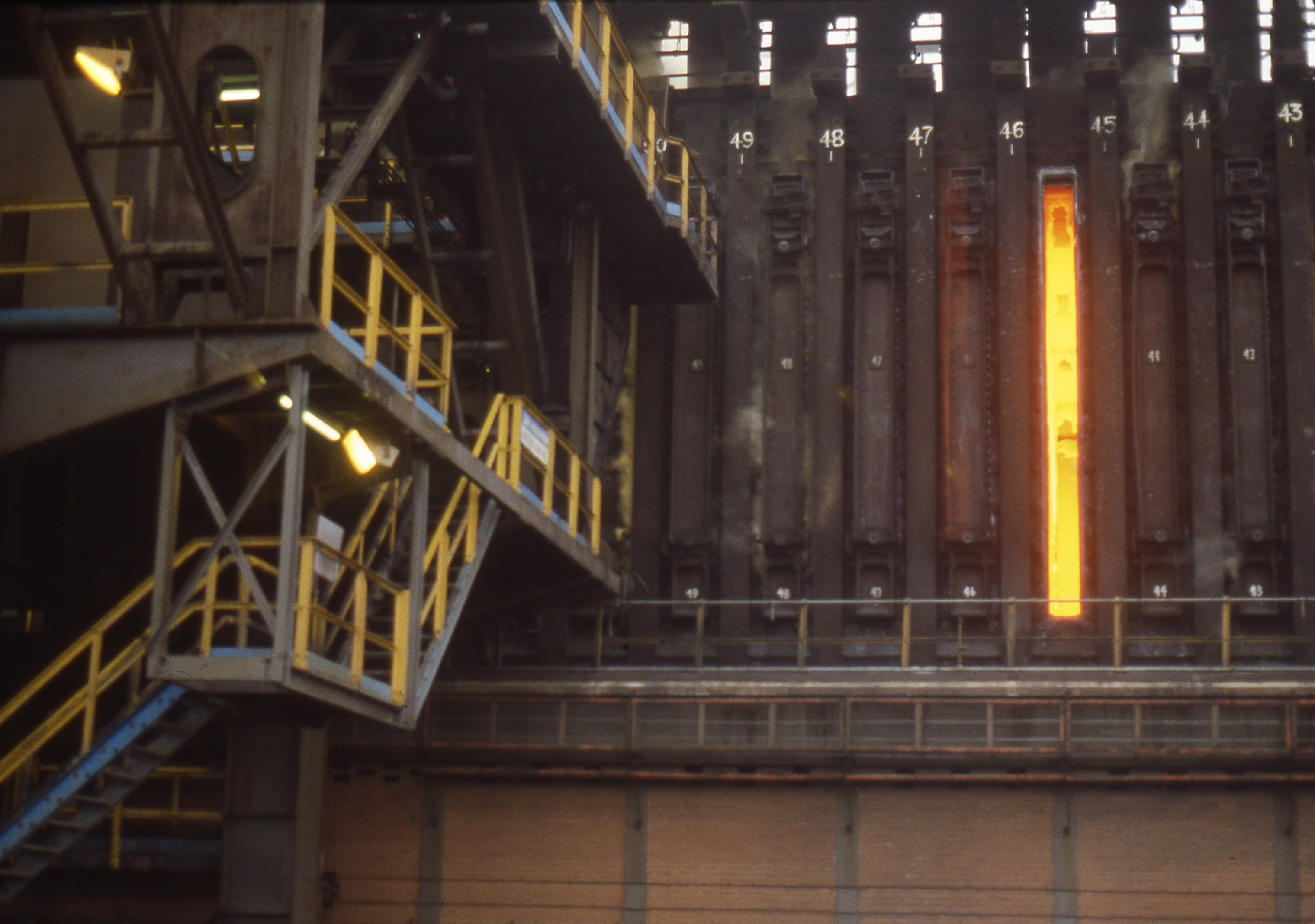
A coke oven at a smokeless fuel plant, Abercwmboi, Wales, 1976

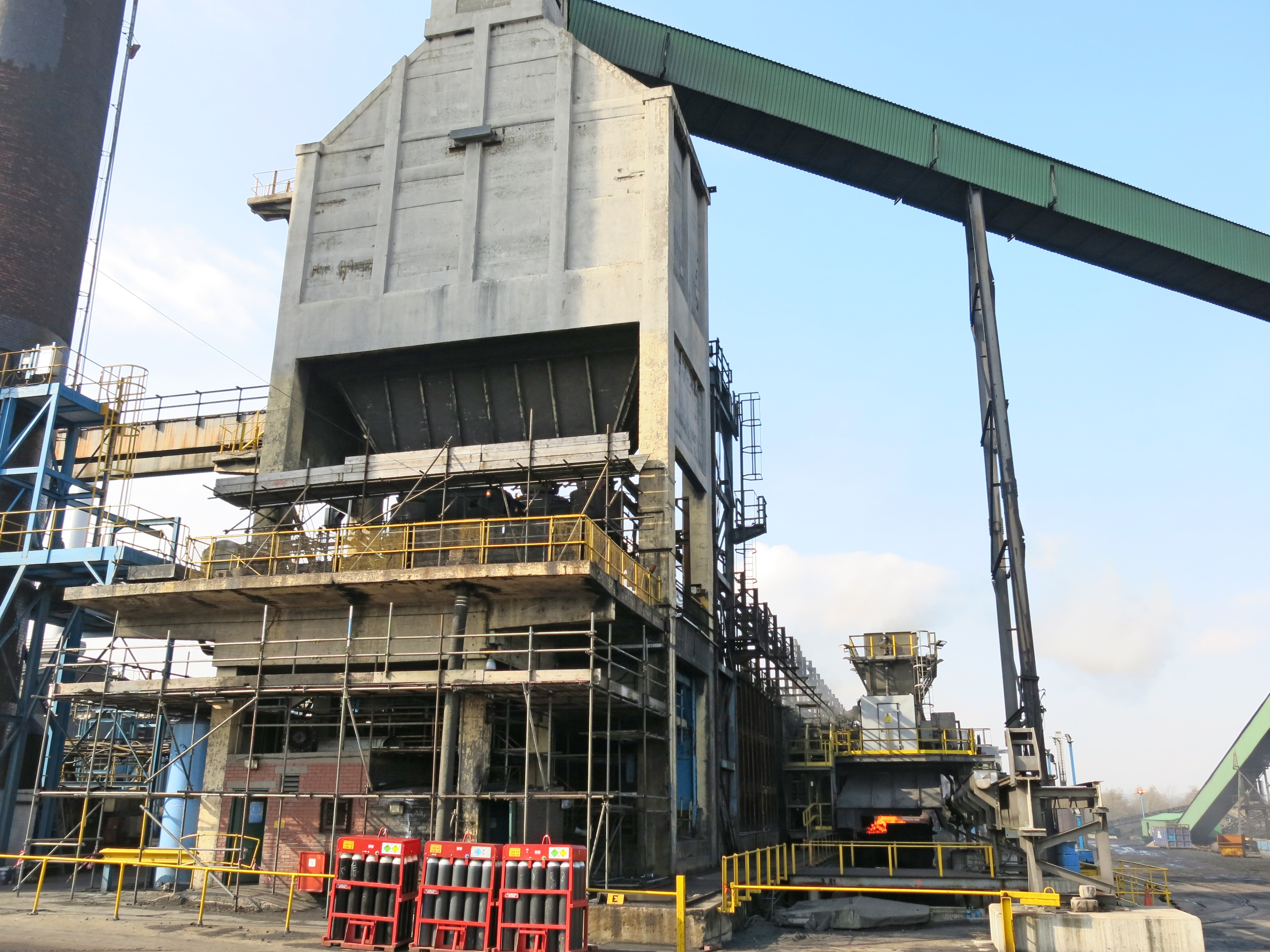
The Monckton Coke Works at Royston, South Yorkshire, in operation discharging glowing coke from one of the bank of ovens on the left in 2013

The industrial production of coke from coal is called coking. The coal is baked in an airless kiln, a coke furnace or coking oven, at temperatures as high as 2,000 °C (3,600 °F) but usually around 1,000–1,100 °C (1,800–2,000 °F). This process vaporises or decomposes organic substances in the coal, driving off water and other volatile and liquid products such as coal gas and coal tar. Coke is the non-volatile residue of the decomposition, the cemented-together carbon and mineral residue of the original coal particles in the form of a hard and somewhat glassy solid.

Byproducts of the coking were the basis of the 19th century British chemical industry, coal-tar pitch, ammonia (NH_{3}), hydrogen sulphide (H_{2}S), pyridine, hydrogen cyanide, and carbon-based material. Some facilities have "by-product" coking ovens in which the volatile decomposition products are collected, purified, and separated for use in other industries, as fuel or chemical feedstocks. Otherwise the volatile byproducts are burned to heat the coking ovens. This is an older method, but is still being used for new construction.

==== Sources ====
Bituminous coal must meet a set of criteria for use as coking coal, determined by particular coal assay techniques. These include moisture content, ash content, sulphur content, volatile content, tar, and plasticity. The goal is to achieve a blend of coal that when processed will produce a coke of appropriate strength (generally measured by coke strength after reaction), while losing an appropriate amount of mass. Other blending considerations include ensuring the coke will not swell too much during production and destroy the coke oven through excessive wall pressures.

The greater the volatile matter in coal, the more by-product can be produced. It is generally considered that levels of 26–29% of volatile matter in the coal blend are good for coking purposes. Thus, different types of coal are proportionally blended to reach acceptable levels of volatility before the coking process begins. If the range of coal types is too great, the resulting coke is of widely varying strength and ash content, and is usually unsaleable, although in some cases it may be sold as an ordinary heating fuel. As coke has already lost its volatile matter, it cannot be coked again.

Coking coal is different from thermal coal, but arises from the same basic coal-forming process. Coking coal has different macerals from thermal coal, i.e. different forms of the compressed and fossilized vegetative matter that compose the coal. The different macerals arise from different mixtures of the plant species and variations of the conditions under which the coal has formed. Coking coal is graded according to its ash percentage-by-weight after burning:

- Steel Grade I (Ash content not exceeding 15%)
- Steel Grade II (15–18%)
- Washery Grade I (18–21%)
- Washery Grade II (21–24%)
- Washery Grade III (24–28%)
- Washery Grade IV (28–35%)

=== The "hearth" process ===
The "hearth" process of coke-making, using lump coal, was akin to that of charcoal-burning; instead of a heap of prepared wood, covered with twigs, leaves, and earth, there was a heap of coal, covered with coke dust. The hearth process continued to be used in many areas during the first half of the 19th century, but two events greatly lessened its importance. These were the invention of the hot blast in iron-smelting and the introduction of the beehive coke oven. The use of a blast of hot air, instead of cold air, in the smelting furnace was first introduced by Neilson in Scotland in 1828. The hearth process of making coke from coal is a very lengthy process.

=== Beehive coke oven ===
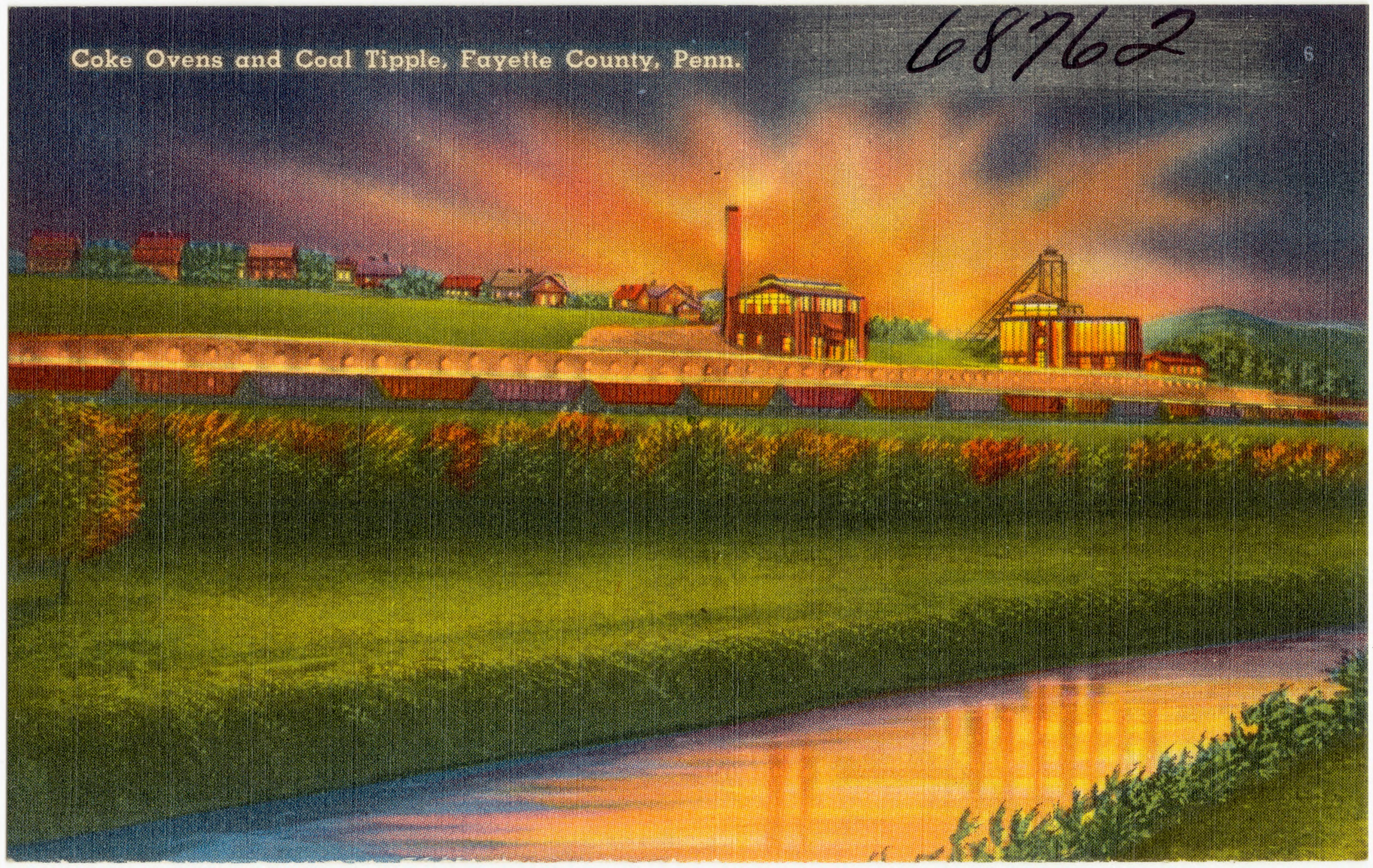
Postcard depicting coke ovens and coal tipple in Fayette County, Pennsylvania

A firebrick chamber shaped like a dome is used, commonly known as a beehive oven. It is typically about 4 meters (13 ft) wide and 2.5 meters (8 ft) high. The roof has a hole for charging the coal or other kindling from the top. A discharging hole is provided in the circumference of the lower part of the wall. In a coke-oven battery, a number of ovens are built in a row with common walls between neighboring ovens. A battery consisted of a great many ovens, sometimes hundreds, in a row.

Coal is introduced from the top to produce an even layer of about 60 to 90 centimeters (24 to 35 in) deep. Air is supplied initially, to ignite the coal. Carbonization starts and produces volatile matter, which burns inside the partially closed side door. Carbonization proceeds from top to bottom and is completed in two to three days. The heat required for the process is supplied by the burning volatile matter, so no by-products are recovered. The exhaust gases are allowed to escape to the atmosphere. The hot coke is quenched with water, and is discharged manually through the side door. When the oven is used on a continuous basis, the walls and roof retain enough heat to initiate carbonization of the next charge.

When coal was burned in a coke oven, the impurities of the coal that were not driven off as gases accumulated in the oven as slag – effectively a conglomeration of the removed impurities. Since this slag was not the desired product, it was initially just discarded. Later, however, coke-oven slag was found to be useful, and has since been used as an ingredient in brick-making, mixed cement, granule-covered shingles, and even as a fertilizer.

=== Occupational safety ===
People can be exposed to coke oven emissions in the workplace by inhalation, skin contact, or eye contact. For the United States, the Occupational Safety and Health Administration (OSHA) has set the legal limit for coke oven emissions exposure in the workplace as 0.150 mg/m^{3} benzene-soluble fraction over an eight-hour workday. The US National Institute for Occupational Safety and Health (NIOSH) has set a recommended exposure limit (REL) of 0.2 mg/m^{3} benzene-soluble fraction over an eight-hour workday.

== Uses ==
Coke can be used as a fuel and as a reducing agent in smelting iron ore in a blast furnace. The carbon monoxide produced by combustion of coke reduces iron oxide (hematite) to produce iron:

Fe_{2}O_{3} + 3CO → 2Fe + 3CO_{2}.

Coke is commonly used as fuel for blacksmithing.

Coke was used in Australia in the 1960s and early 1970s for house heating, and was incentivized for home use in the UK (so as to displace coal) after the 1956 Clean Air Act, which was passed in response to the Great Smog of London in 1952.

Since smoke-producing constituents are driven off during the coking of coal, coke forms a desirable fuel for stoves and furnaces in which conditions are not suitable for the complete burning of bituminous coal itself. Coke may be combusted producing little or no smoke, while bituminous coal would produce much smoke. Coke was widely used as a smokeless substitute for coal in domestic heating following the creation of "smokeless zones" in the United Kingdom.

Coke may be used to make synthesis gas, a mixture of carbon monoxide and hydrogen.

- Syngas; water gas: a mixture of carbon monoxide and hydrogen, made by passing steam over red-hot coke (or any carbon-based char). Hydrocarbonate (gas) is identical, although it emerged in the late eighteenth century as an inhalation therapeutic developed by Thomas Beddoes and James Watt categorized under factitious airs .
- Producer gas; wood gas; generator gas; synthetic gas: a mixture of carbon monoxide, hydrogen, and nitrogen, made by passing air over red-hot coke (or any carbon-based char).
- Coke oven gas generated from coke ovens is similar to syngas with 60% hydrogen by volume. The hydrogen can be extracted from the coke oven gas economically for various uses (including steel production).

=== In foundry components ===
Finely-ground bituminous coal, known in this application as sea coal, is a constituent of foundry sand. While the molten metal is in the mould, the coal burns slowly, releasing reducing gases at pressure, and so preventing the metal from penetrating the pores of the sand. It is also contained in "mould wash", a paste or liquid with the same function applied to the mould before casting. Sea coal can be mixed with the clay lining (the "bod") used for the bottom of a cupola furnace. When heated, the coal decomposes and the bod becomes slightly friable, easing the process of breaking open holes for tapping the molten metal.

== Phenolic byproducts ==
Wastewater from coking is highly toxic and carcinogenic. It contains phenolic, aromatic, heterocyclic, and polycyclic organics, and inorganics including cyanides, sulfides, ammonium, and ammonia. Various methods for its treatment have been studied in recent years. The white rot fungus Phanerochaete chrysosporium can remove up to 80% of phenols from coking waste water.

== Properties ==
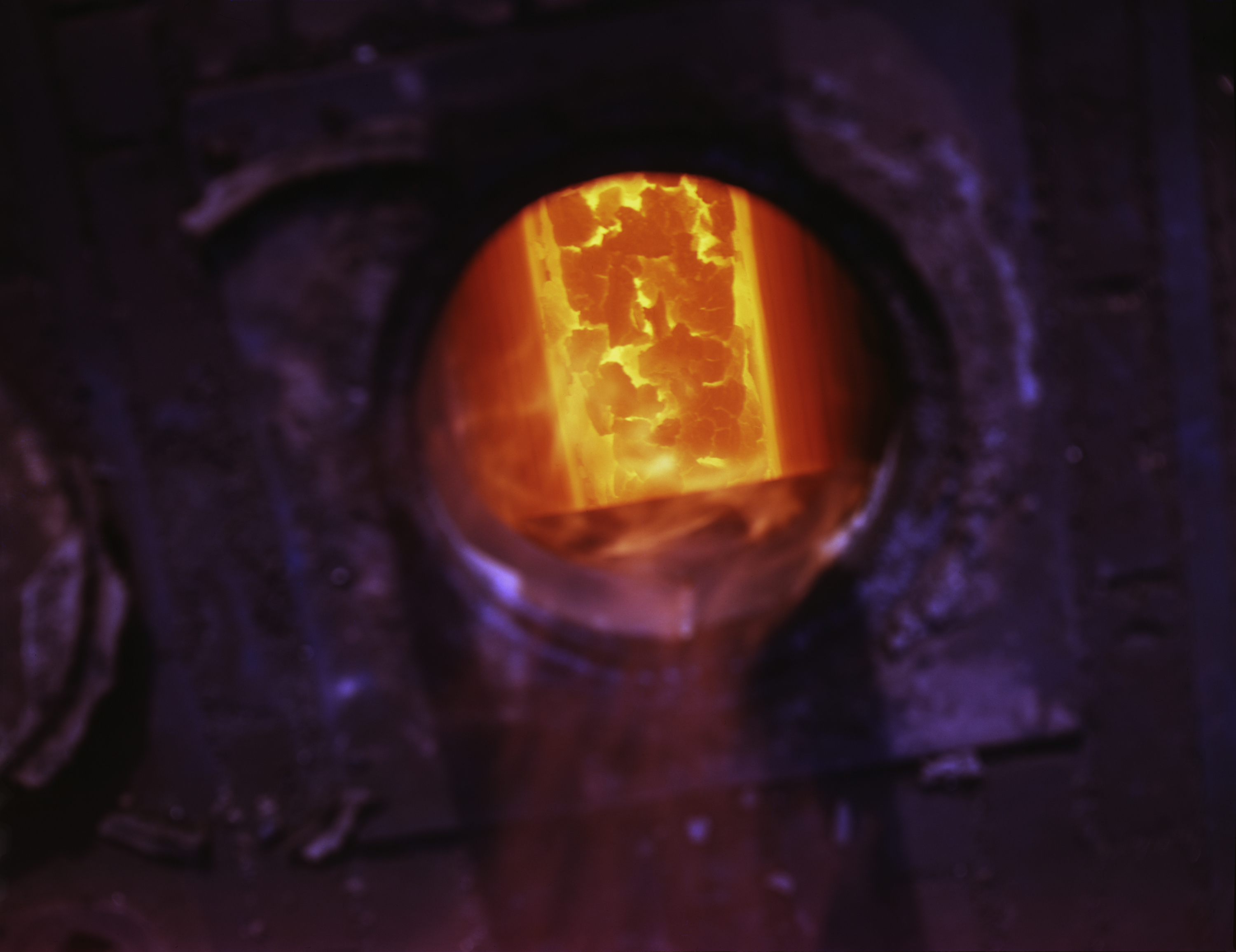
Hanna furnaces of the Great Lakes Steel Corporation, Detroit. Coal tower atop coke ovens. Photographed by Arthur Siegel, November 1942.

Before bituminous coal is used as coking coal, it must meet a set of criteria determined by particular coal assay techniques.

The bulk specific gravity of coke is typically around 0.77. It is highly porous. Both the chemical composition and physical properties are important to the usefulness of coke in blast furnaces. In terms of composition, low ash and sulphur content are desirable. Other important characteristics are the M10, M25, and M40 test-crush indexes, which convey the strength of coke during transportation into the blast furnaces; depending on the blast furnace's size, finely crushed coke pieces must not be allowed into the furnace because they would impede the flow of gas through the charge of iron and coke. A related characteristic is the Coke Strength After Reaction (CSR) index; it represents coke's ability to withstand the violent conditions inside the blast furnace before turning into fine particles. Pieces of coke are denoted with the following terminology: "bell coke" (30–80 mm), "nut coke" (10–30 mm), "coke breeze" (< 10 mm).

The water content in coke is practically zero at the end of the coking process, but it is often water-quenched so that it can be transported to the blast furnaces. The porous structure of coke absorbs some water, usually 3–6% of its mass. In more modern coke plants, an advanced method of coke cooling uses air quenching.

== Other processes ==
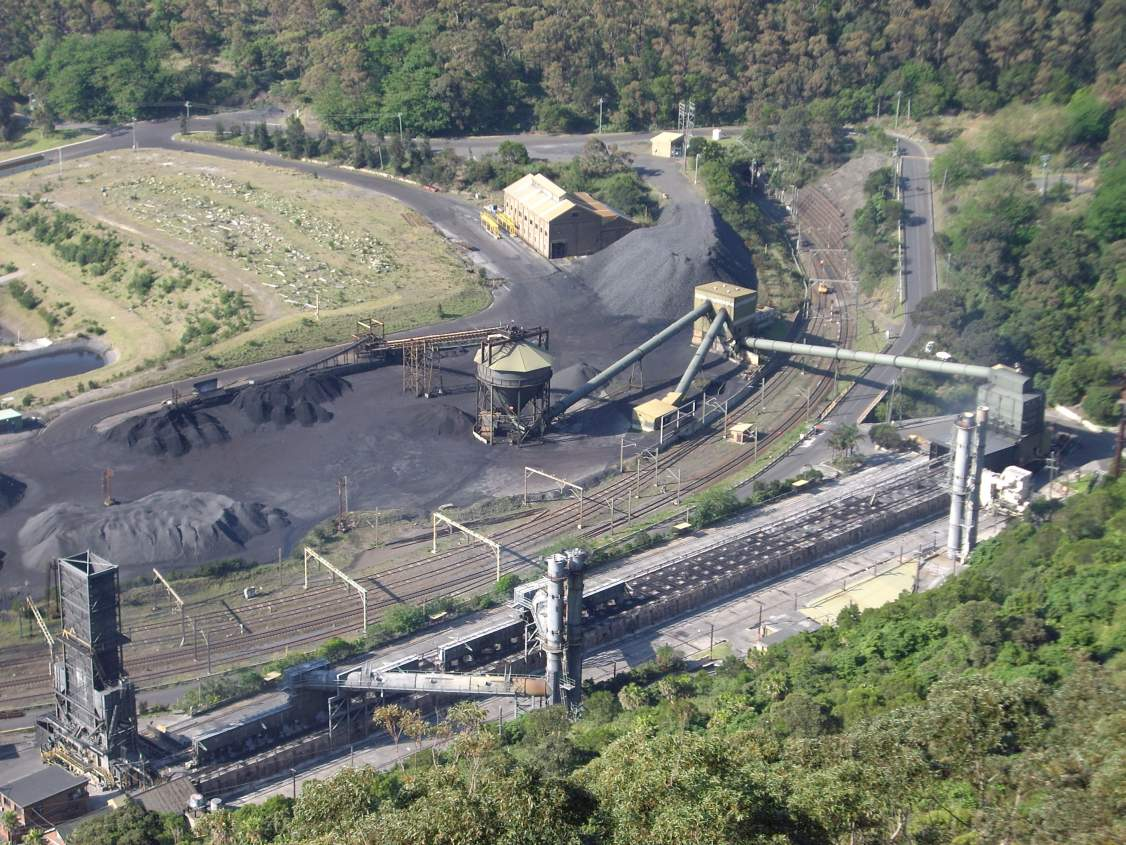
The Illawarra Coke Company (ICC) in Coalcliff, New South Wales, Australia

The solid residue remaining from refinement of petroleum by the "cracking" process is also a form of coke. Petroleum coke has many uses besides being a fuel, such as the manufacture of dry cells and of electrolytic and welding electrodes.

Gas works manufacturing syngas also produce coke as an end product, called gas-house coke.

Fluid coking is a process which converts heavy residual crude into lighter products such as naphtha, kerosene, heating oil, and hydrocarbon gases. The "fluid" term refers to the fact that solid coke particles behave as a fluid solid in the continuous fluid coking process versus the older batch delayed-coking process where a solid mass of coke builds up in the coke drum over time.

Due to a lack of oil or high-quality coals in East Germany, scientists developed a process to turn low-quality lignite into coke called high temperature lignite coke.

== Alternatives to coke ==
Scrap steel can be recycled in an electric arc furnace, and an alternative to making iron by smelting is direct reduced iron, where any carbonaceous fuel can be used to make sponge or pelletised iron. To lessen carbon dioxide emissions, hydrogen can be used as the reducing agent and biomass or waste as the source of carbon. Historically, charcoal has been used as an alternative to coke in a blast furnace, with the resultant iron being known as charcoal iron.

== History ==
=== China ===
Many historical sources dating to the 4th century describe the production of coke in ancient China. The Chinese first used coke for heating and cooking no later than the 9th century. By the first decades of the 11th century, Chinese ironworkers in the Yellow River valley began to fuel their furnaces with coke, solving their fuel problem in that tree-sparse region. By 1078 CE, the implementation of coke as a replacement to charcoal in the production of iron in China dramatically increased the industry to 125,000 tons per year. The iron was used for the creation of tools, weapons, chains for suspension bridges, and Buddhist statues.

China is the largest producer and exporter of coke today. China produces 60% of the world's coke. Concerns about air pollution have motivated technological changes in the coke industry by elimination of outdated cooking technologies that are not energy-efficient.

=== Great Britain ===
In 1589, a patent was granted to Thomas Proctor and William Peterson for making iron and steel and melting lead with "earth-coal, sea-coal, turf, and peat". The patent contains a distinct allusion to the preparation of coal by "cooking". In 1590, a patent was granted to the Dean of York to "purify pit-coal and free it from its offensive smell". In 1620, a patent was granted to a company composed of William St. John and other knights, mentioning the use of coke in smelting ores and manufacturing metals. In 1627, a patent was granted to Sir John Hacket and Octavius de Strada for a method of rendering sea-coal and pit-coal as useful as charcoal for burning in houses, without offense by smell of smoke.

In 1603, Hugh Plat suggested that coal might be charred in a manner analogous to the way charcoal is produced from wood. This process was not employed until 1642, when coke was used for roasting malt in Derbyshire; previously, brewers had used wood, as uncoked coal cannot be used in brewing because its sulphurous fumes would impart a foul taste to the beer. It was considered an improvement in quality, and brought about an "alteration which all England admired"—the coke process allowed for a lighter roast of the malt, leading to the creation of what by the end of the 17th century was called pale ale.

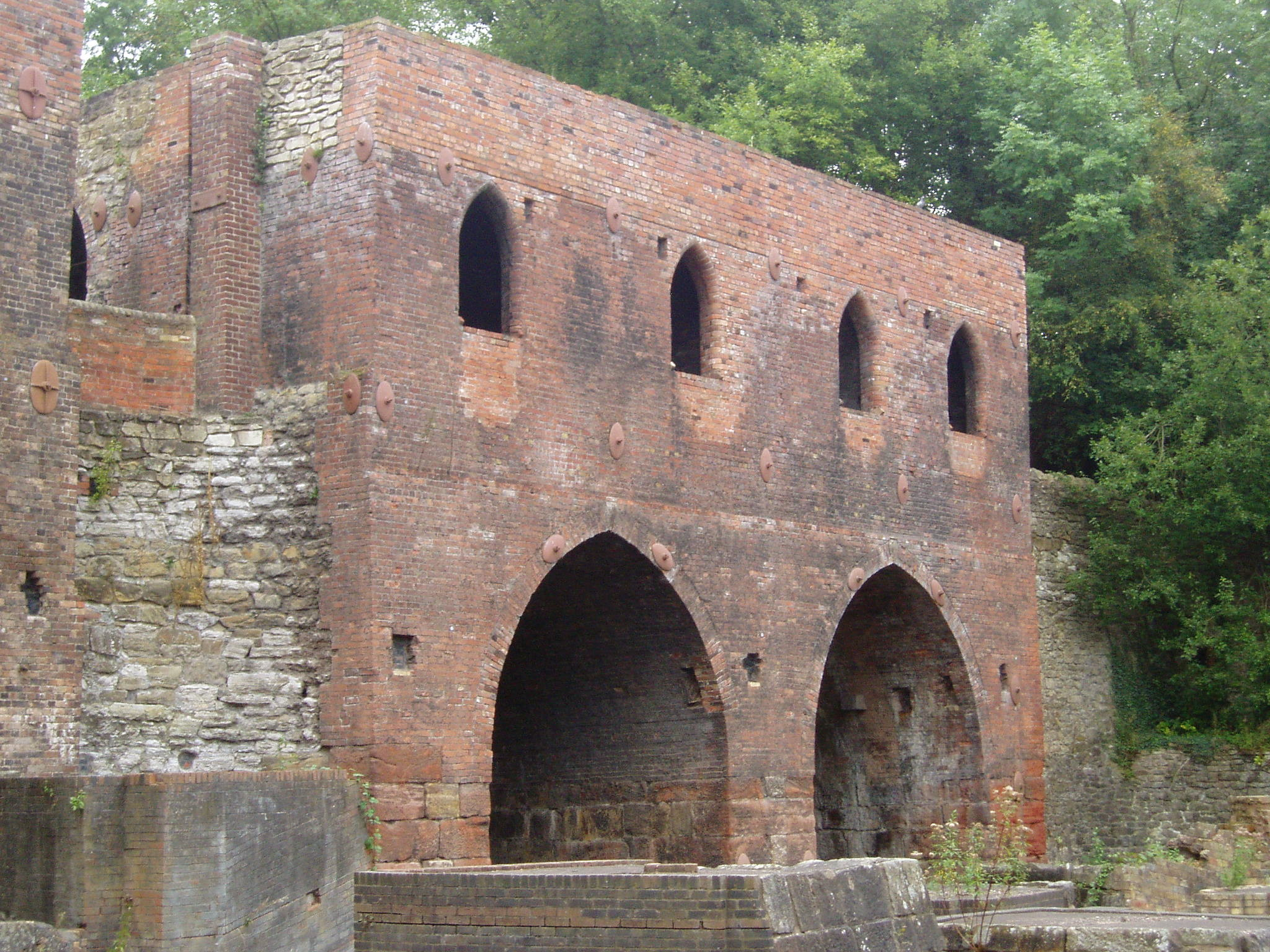
The original blast furnaces at Blists Hill, Madeley

In 1709, Abraham Darby I established a coke-fired blast furnace to produce cast iron. Coke's superior crushing strength allowed blast furnaces to become taller and larger. The ensuing availability of inexpensive iron was one of the factors leading to the Industrial Revolution. Before this time, iron-making used large quantities of charcoal, produced by burning wood. As the coppicing of forests became unable to meet the demand, the substitution of coke for charcoal became common in Great Britain, and coke was manufactured by burning coal in heaps on the ground so that only the outer layer burned, leaving the interior of the pile in a carbonized state. In the late 18th century, brick beehive ovens were developed, which allowed more control over the burning process.

In 1768, John Wilkinson built a more practical oven for converting coal into coke. Wilkinson improved the process by building the coal heaps around a low central chimney built of loose bricks and with openings for the combustion gases to enter, resulting in a higher yield of better coke. With greater skill in the firing, covering, and quenching of the heaps, yields were increased from about 33% to 65% by the middle of the 19th century. The Scottish iron industry expanded rapidly in the second quarter of the 19th century, through the adoption of the hot-blast process in its coalfields.

In 1802, a battery of beehive ovens was set up near Sheffield, to coke the Silkstone coal seam for use in crucible steel melting. By 1870, there were 14,000 beehive ovens in operation on the West Durham coalfields, producing 4,000,000 long tons of coke per year. As a measure of the expansion of coke making, the requirements of the iron industry in Britain were about 1,000,000 tons per year in the early 1850s, rising to about 7,000,000 tons by 1880. Of these, about 5,000,000 tons were produced in Durham county, 1,000,000 tons in the South Wales coalfield, and 1,000,000 tons in Yorkshire and Derbyshire.

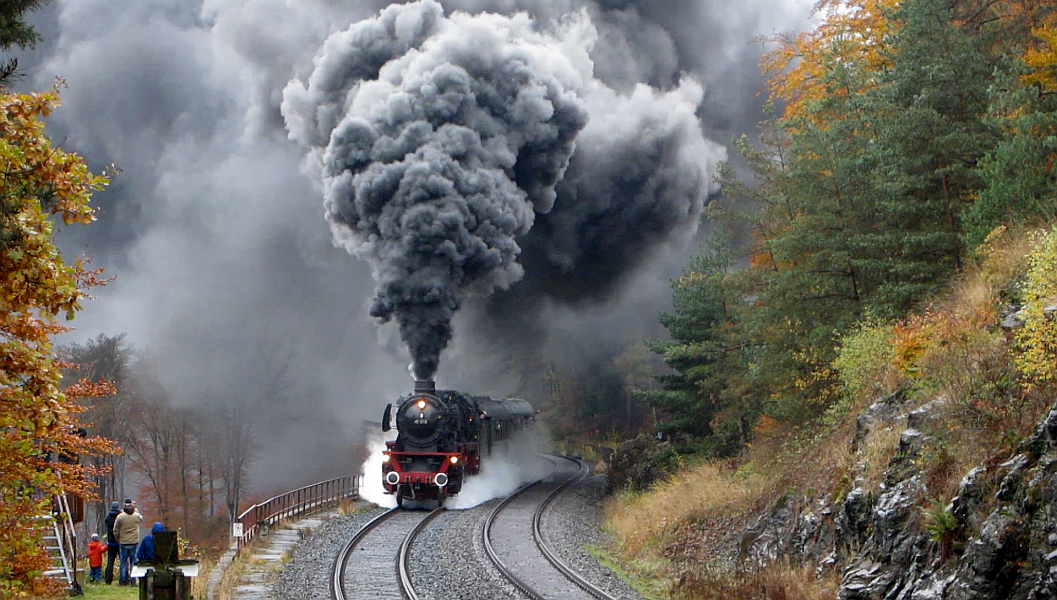
41 018 of the Deutsche Reichsbahn climbing the famous Schiefe Ebene, 2016

In the first years of steam locomotives, coke was the normal fuel. This resulted from an early piece of environmental legislation; any proposed locomotive had to "consume its own smoke". This was not technically possible to achieve until the firebox arch came into use, but burning coke, with its low smoke emissions, was considered to meet the requirement. This rule was quietly dropped, and cheaper coal became the normal fuel, as railways gained acceptance among the public. The smoke plume produced by a travelling locomotive seems now to be a mark of a steam railway, and so preserved for posterity.

So-called "gas works" produced coke by heating coal in enclosed chambers. The flammable gas that was given off was stored in gas holders, to be used domestically and industrially for cooking, heating, and lighting. The gas was commonly known as "town gas" since underground networks of pipes ran through most towns. It was replaced by "natural gas" (initially from the North Sea oil and gas fields) in the decade after 1967. Other byproducts of coke production included tar and ammonia, while the coke was used instead of coal in cooking ranges and to provide heat in domestic premises before the advent of central heating.

=== Continental Europe ===
In 1785, the first coke-fired iron was cast in France in Le Creusot.

John Baildon, on the invitation of Friedrich von Reden, was responsible for the introduction of coke into iron-making in Prussian Silesia, in what is now Poland (in Gleiwitz/Gliwice (1796) and, on a large scale, in Königshütte/Chorzów (1802).

=== United States ===
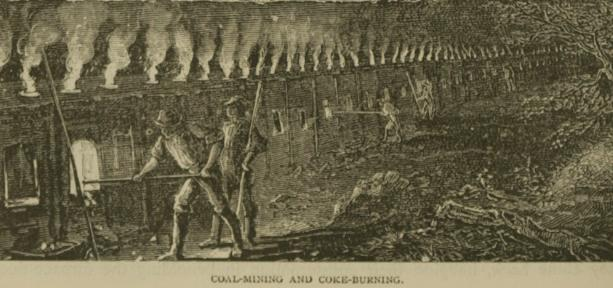
Illustration of coal mining and coke burning from 1879

In the US, the first use of coke in an iron furnace occurred around 1817 at Isaac Meason's Plumsock puddling furnace and rolling mill in Fayette County, Pennsylvania. In the late 19th century, the coalfields of western Pennsylvania provided a rich source of raw material for coking. In 1885, the Rochester and Pittsburgh Coal and Iron Company constructed the world's longest string of coke ovens in Walston, Pennsylvania, with 475 ovens over a length of 2 kilometres (1.2 mi). Their output reached 22,000 tons per month. The Minersville Coke Ovens in Huntingdon County, Pennsylvania, were listed on the National Register of Historic Places in 1991.

Between 1870 and 1905, the number of beehive ovens in the US increased from approximately 200 to nearly 31,000, which produced nearly 18,000,000 tons of coke in the Pittsburgh area alone. One observer boasted that if loaded into a train, "the year's production would make up a train so long that the engine in front of it would go to San Francisco and come back to Connellsville before the caboose had gotten started out of the Connellsville yards!" The number of beehive ovens in Pittsburgh peaked in 1910 at almost 48,000.

Although it made a top-quality fuel, coking poisoned the surrounding landscape. After 1900, the serious environmental damage of beehive coking attracted national notice, although the damage had plagued the district for decades. "The smoke and gas from some ovens destroy all vegetation around the small mining communities", noted W. J. Lauck of the U.S. Immigration Commission in 1911. Passing through the region on train, University of Wisconsin president Charles Van Hise saw "long rows of beehive ovens from which flame is bursting and dense clouds of smoke issuing, making the sky dark. By night, the scene is rendered indescribably vivid by these numerous burning pits. The beehive ovens make the entire region of coke manufacture one of dulled sky: cheerless and unhealthful."

A 2024 report stated that 17 coke-burning facilities in the US could be responsible for an estimated 892 premature deaths every year, as well as increased asthma symptoms and other health impacts for residents.

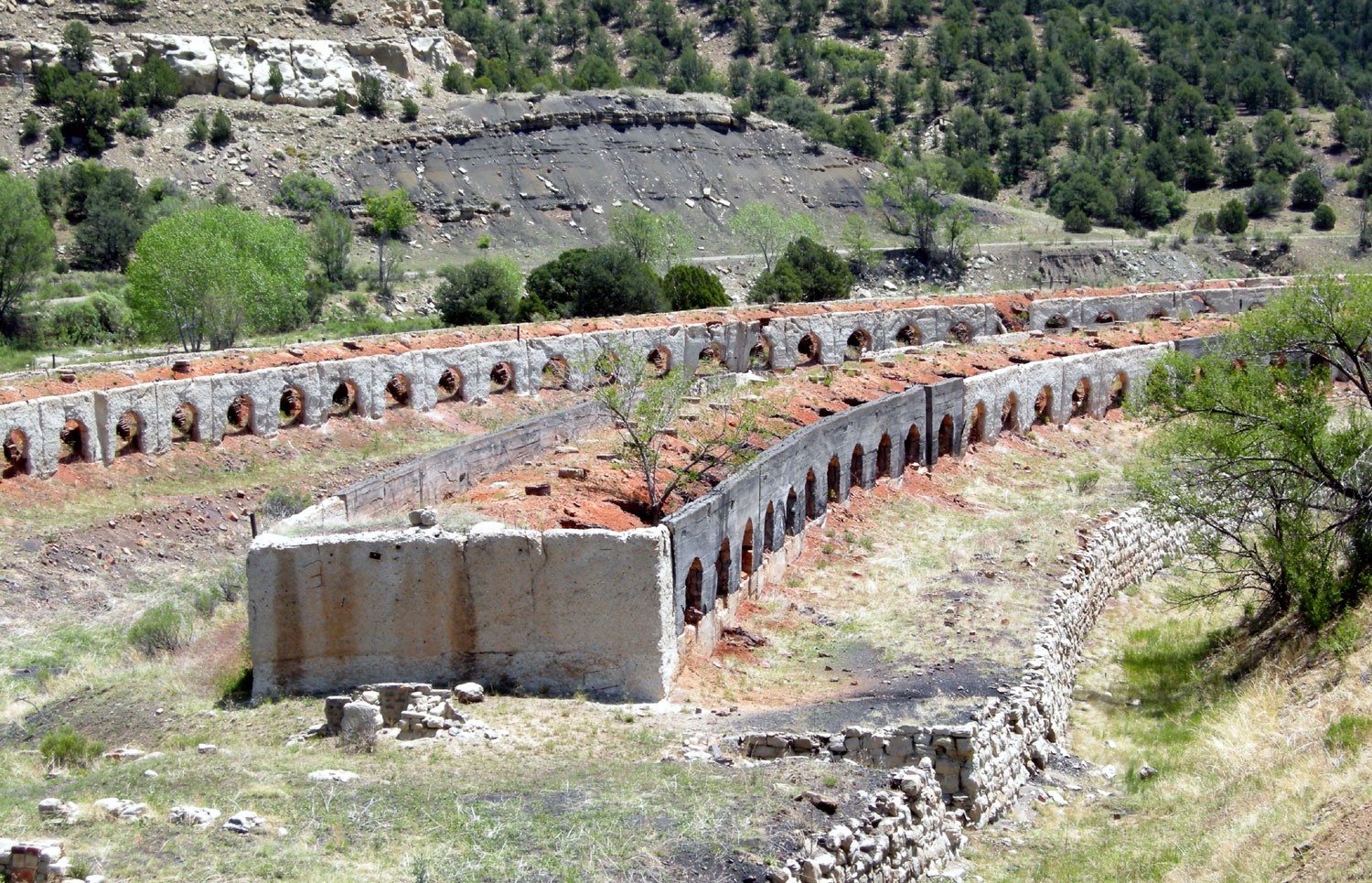
Coal coking ovens at Cokedale, Colorado, supplied steel mills in Pueblo, CO

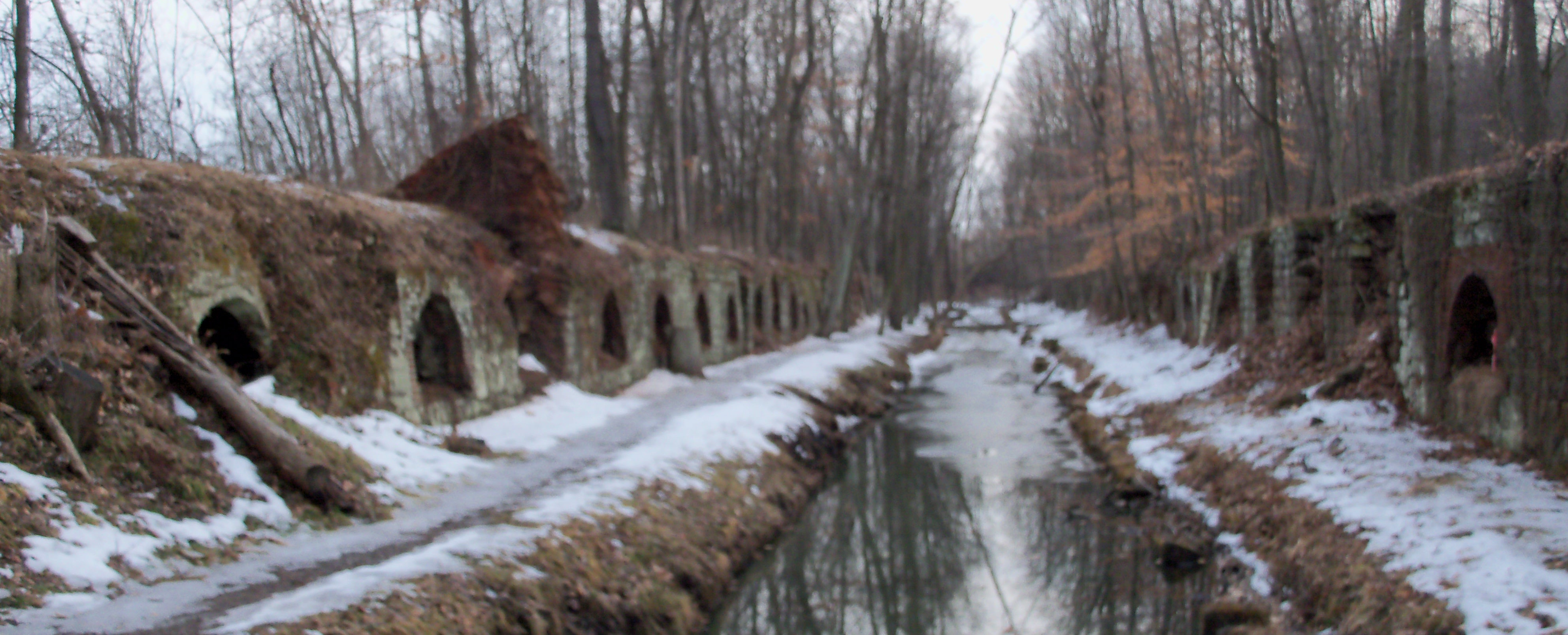
The 200 Cherry Valley Coke Ovens built around 1866

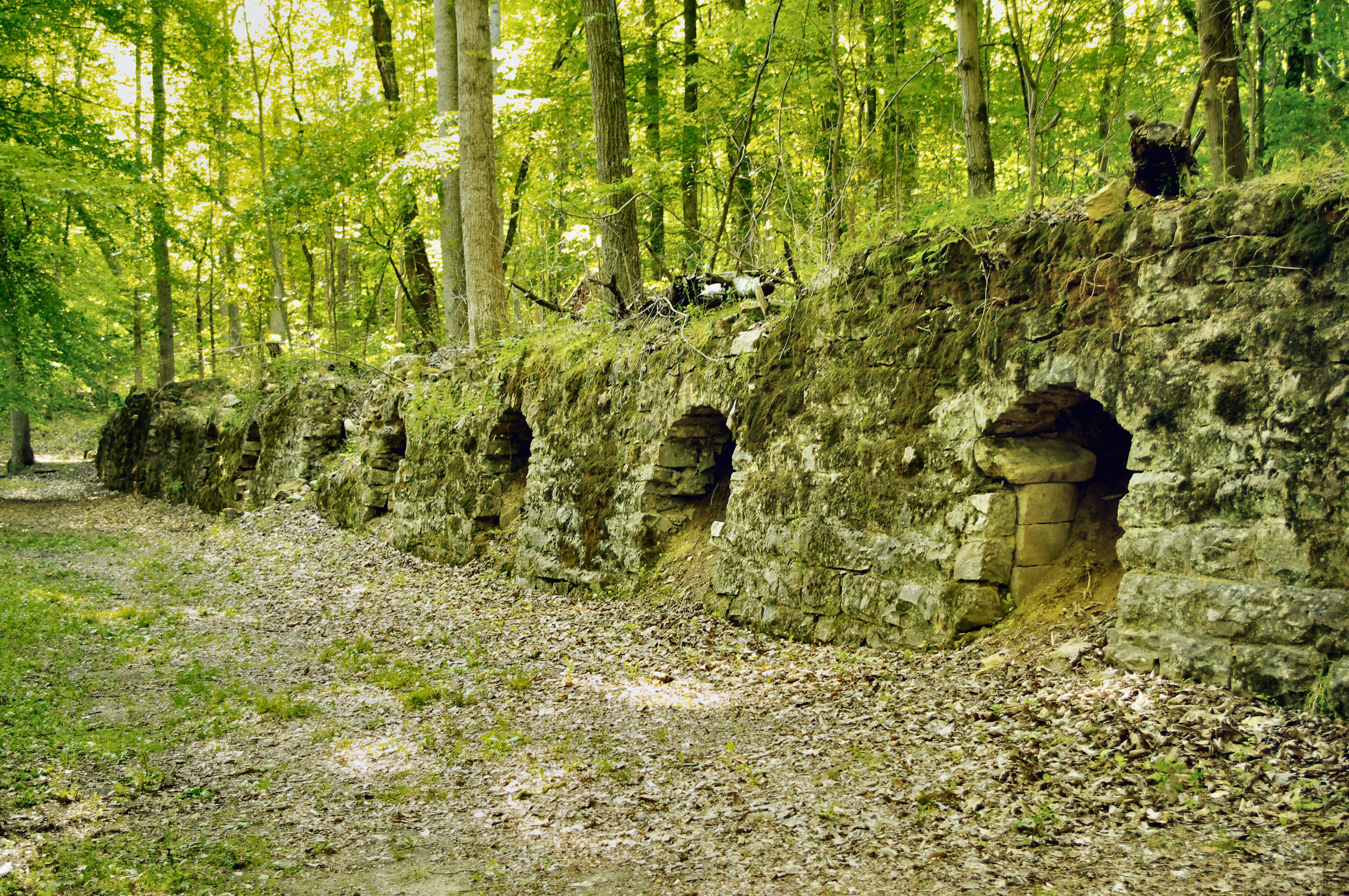
Dunlap coke ovens

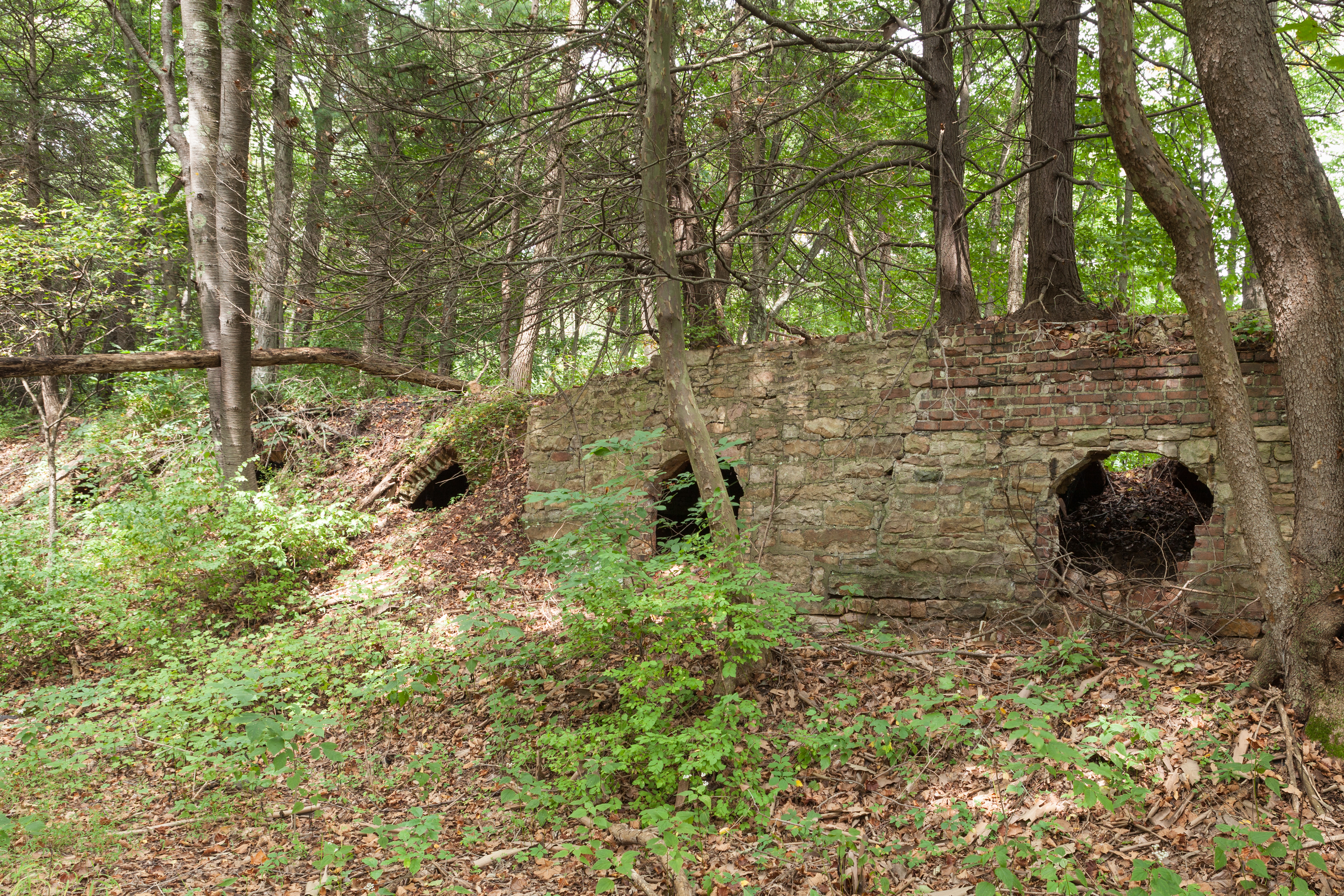
Minersville Coke Ovens

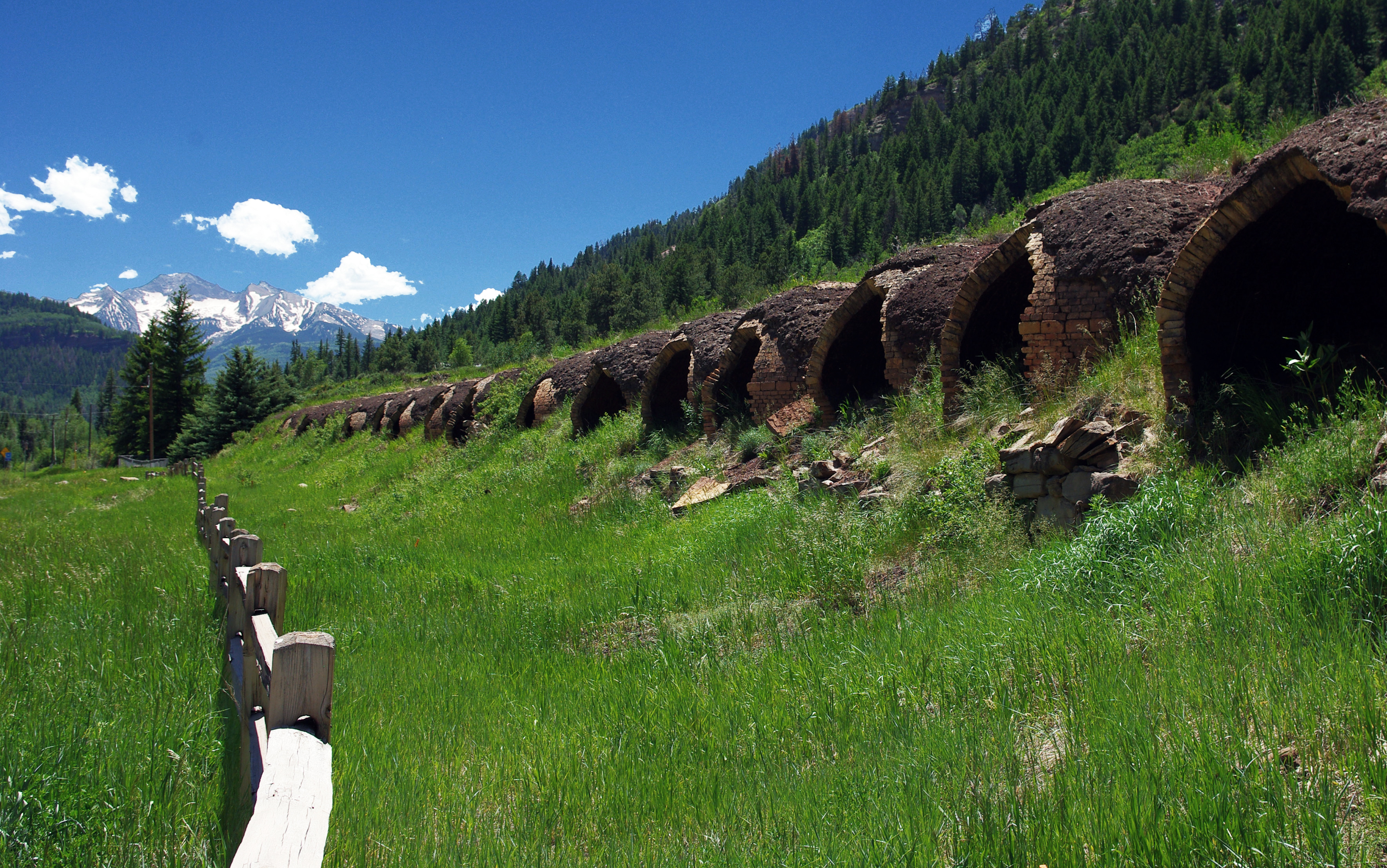
Redstone Coke Oven Historic District

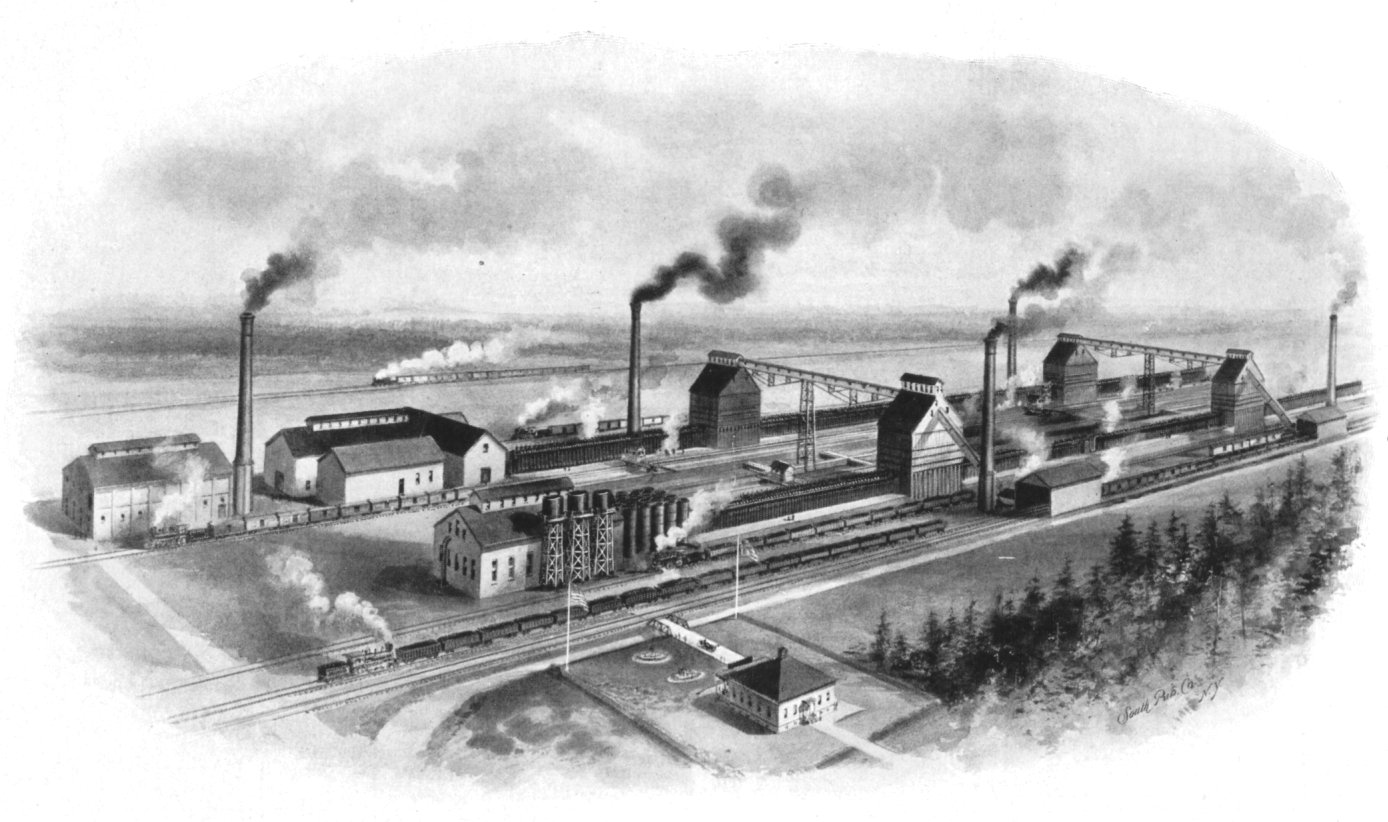
Sydney Tar Ponds

== See also ==
- Charcoal, made from wood rather than coal
- Coking factory
- History of manufactured gas
- List of CO2 emitted per million Btu of energy from various fuels
- Petroleum coke
- Pyrolysis
- Sydney Tar Ponds, environmental damage caused by coke oven
- Tar
