= Coke strength after reaction =

Coke Strength after Reaction (CSR) refers to coke "hot" strength, generally a quality reference in a simulated reaction condition in an industrial blast furnace. The test is based on a procedure developed by Nippon Steel Corp in the 1970s as an attempt to get an indication of coke performance and is used widely throughout the world since then. It is one of the major considerations when blending coking coal for export sale.

== Test procedure ==
The coke sample is first tested for its reactivity (CRI), then the same sample is tested for strength (CSR).

=== Reactivity test ===
A 200 g sample of 19–21 mm particle range coke is heated at 1100°C under 1 atmosphere pressure of carbon dioxide for 2 hours. Next, the coke is cooled under nitrogen and the weight loss resulting from reaction is measured. The percentage weight loss is known as reactivity (CRI).

=== Strength test ===
The reacted coke is placed in an I-type drum (no lifters) and subjected to 600 revolutions in 30 minutes. The percent of carbon material removed from the drum that is ≥10 mm is known as the coke strength after reaction (CSR).
