= United Kingdom =

Country in Northwestern Europe

United Kingdom of Great Britain and Northern Ireland
- Flag
- Anthem: "God Save the King" (Note: "God Save the King" is the national anthem by custom, not statute, and there is no authorised version. Typically only the first verse is usually sung, although the second verse is also often sung as well at state and public events. The words King, he, him, his, used at present, are replaced by Queen, she, her when the monarch is female.)
- Coat of arms: Used in relation to Scotland (right) and elsewhere (left)

- Capital and largest city: London; 51°30′N 0°7′W
- National language: English
- Regional and minority languages (Note: Scots, Ulster Scots, Welsh, Cornish, Scottish Gaelic and Irish are classed as regional or minority languages under the Council of Europe's European Charter for Regional or Minority Languages. These include defined obligations to promote those languages. See also Languages of the United Kingdom. Welsh has limited de jure official status in Wales, as well as in the provision of national government services provided for Wales.): Scots; Ulster Scots; Welsh; Cornish; Scottish Gaelic; Irish; British Sign Language
- Ethnic groups (2021) (Note: Whereas the censuses of England and Wales and of Northern Ireland went ahead as planned in 2021, the census in Scotland was postponed until 2022. The Office for National Statistics reports that these UK-wide statistics "have been created to provide an image of how UK census data may have looked if the most recent UK censuses had been conducted with an aligned date of 21 March 2021".): 83.1% White; 8.6% Asian; 3.7% Black; 2.7% Mixed; 2.0% other
- Religion (2021): 46.6% Christianity; 37.6% no religion; 6.0% Islam; 1.6% Hinduism; 2.2% other; 5.9% not stated
- Demonyms: British; Briton; Brit (colloquial)
- Government: Unitary parliamentary constitutional monarchy (Note: Although the United Kingdom has traditionally been seen as a unitary state, an alternative description of the UK as a "union state", put forward by, amongst others, Vernon Bogdanor, has become increasingly influential since the adoption of devolution in the 1990s. A union state is considered to differ from a unitary state in that while it maintains a central authority it also recognises the authority of historic rights and infrastructures of its component parts.)
  - Monarch: Charles III
  - Prime Minister: Andy Burnham
- Legislature: Parliament
  - Upper house: House of Lords
  - Lower house: House of Commons

Formation
  - Laws in Wales Acts: 1535 and 1542
  - Union of the Crowns: 24 March 1603
  - Treaty of Union: 22 July 1706
  - Acts of Union of England and Scotland: 1 May 1707
  - Acts of Union of Great Britain and Ireland: 1 January 1801
  - Irish Free State Constitution Act: 6 December 1922

Area
  - Total (Note: ONS Standard Area Measurement, 'area to mean high water'. Excludes the Crown Dependencies and British Overseas Territories.): 244,376 km^{2} (94,354 sq mi) (78th)
  - Land (Note: ONS Standard Area Measurement, "area to mean high water excluding inland water". Excludes the Crown Dependencies and British Overseas Territories.): 242,494 km^{2} (93,627 sq mi)

Population
  - 2025 estimate: ▲69,483,939 (20th)
  - 2021 census: ▲66,912,637
  - Density: 287/km^{2} (743.3/sq mi) (48th)
- GDP (PPP): 2026 estimate
  - Total: ▲$4.783 trillion (10th)
  - Per capita: ▲$68,476 (33rd)
- GDP (nominal): 2026 estimate
  - Total: ▲$4.268 trillion (5th)
  - Per capita: ▲$61,108 (21st)
- Gini (2021): ▼35.4 medium inequality
- HDI (2023): ▲0.946 very high (13th)
- Currency: Sterling (Note: Commonly also known as the "pound" (the name of its base unit) or "pound sterling". Some of the devolved countries, Crown Dependencies and British Overseas Territories issue their own sterling banknotes or currencies, or use another nation's currency. See List of British currencies.) (£) (GBP)
- Time zone: UTC+0 (GMT)
  - Summer (DST): UTC+1 (BST (Note: Also observed by the Crown Dependencies. For further information, see Time in the United Kingdom.))
- Date format: dd/mm/yyyy (AD) (Note: The UK Government uses the ISO 8601 format, yyyy-mm-dd, for machine-readable dates and times. See Date and time notation in the United Kingdom.)
- Calling code: +44 (Note: Excludes most overseas territories. See Telephone numbers in the United Kingdom#Telephone numbers in Overseas Territories.)
- ISO 3166 code: GB
- Internet TLD: .uk (Note: The .gb domain is also reserved for the UK, but has been little used.)

The United Kingdom of Great Britain and Northern Ireland, commonly known as the United Kingdom (UK) or Britain, (Note: Usage is mixed. The Guardian and The Telegraph use Britain as a synonym for the United Kingdom. The British Cabinet Office's Government Digital Service style guide for use on gov.uk recommends: "Use UK and United Kingdom in preference to Britain and British (UK business, UK foreign policy, ambassador and high commissioner). But British embassy, not UK embassy.") is a country in Northwestern Europe, off the coast of the continental mainland. It comprises England, Scotland, Wales and Northern Ireland, (Note: The Isle of Man, Guernsey and Jersey are Crown Dependencies and not part of the UK.) with a population of over 69 million in 2025. The UK includes the island of Great Britain, the north-eastern part of the island of Ireland, and most of the smaller islands within the British Isles, covering 94,354 square miles (244,376 km^{2}). It shares a land border with the Republic of Ireland and is surrounded by the Atlantic Ocean, the North Sea, the English Channel, the Celtic Sea and the Irish Sea, while maintaining sovereignty over the Crown Dependencies and the British Overseas Territories. The capital and largest city of England and the UK is London; Edinburgh, Cardiff and Belfast are the national capitals of Scotland, Wales and Northern Ireland, respectively.

The British Isles have been continuously inhabited since the Neolithic. In AD 43 the Roman conquest of Britain began. The Roman departure between 383 and 410 was followed by Anglo-Saxon settlement beginning around 450. In 1066 the Normans conquered England. During the Tudor period, arts, trade, commerce, and exploration flourished. Over the 17th century the role of the British monarchy was reduced, particularly as a result of the English Civil War. In 1707 the Kingdom of England and the Kingdom of Scotland united under the Treaty of Union to create the Kingdom of Great Britain. The Acts of Union 1800 incorporated the Kingdom of Ireland to create the United Kingdom of Great Britain and Ireland in 1801. Most of Ireland seceded from the UK in 1922 as the Irish Free State, and the Royal and Parliamentary Titles Act 1927 created the present United Kingdom.

The UK became the first industrialised country in the world during the 18th century and was the world's foremost power for the majority of the 19th and early 20th centuries, particularly during the Pax Britannica between 1815 and 1914. The British Empire was the leading economic power for most of the 19th century, a position supported by its agricultural prosperity, its role as a dominant trading nation, a massive industrial capacity, significant technological achievements, and the rise of 19th-century London as the world's principal financial centre. At its height in the 1920s, the empire encompassed around a quarter of the world's landmass and population, and was the largest in history. The UK's involvement in the First World War and Second World War would damage Britain's economic power, and a global wave of decolonisation led to the independence of most British colonies, many of which became members of the Commonwealth of Nations.

The UK is a constitutional monarchy and parliamentary democracy (Note: The United Kingdom does not have a codified constitution but an unwritten one formed of Acts of Parliament, court judgments, traditions, and conventions.) with three distinct jurisdictions: England and Wales, Scotland, and Northern Ireland. Scotland, Wales and Northern Ireland have their own governments and parliaments which control various devolved matters. A developed country with an advanced economy, the UK ranks amongst the largest economies by nominal GDP and is one of the world's largest exporters and importers. As a nuclear state with one of the highest defence budgets, the UK maintains one of the strongest militaries in Europe. British culture is globally influential, notably in the Anglosphere and the Commonwealth; its soft power influence is observable in the legal and political systems of many former colonies, and in its exports of language, literature, theatre, cinema, music, media, art and sport. A great power, the UK is part of numerous international organisations.

== Etymology and terminology ==
The Acts of Union 1707 declared that the Kingdom of England and the Kingdom of Scotland were "United into One Kingdom by the Name of Great Britain". (Note: Compare to section 1 of both of the 1800 Acts of Union which reads: "the kingdoms of Great Britain and Ireland shall ... be united into one kingdom, by the name of the United Kingdom of Great Britain and Ireland".) The term "United Kingdom" has occasionally been used for the former Kingdom of Great Britain, although its official name from 1707 to 1800 was simply "Great Britain". The Acts of Union 1800 formed the United Kingdom of Great Britain and Ireland. Following the partition of Ireland and the independence of the Irish Free State in 1922, which left Northern Ireland as the only part of the island of Ireland within the United Kingdom, the name was changed in 1927 to the "United Kingdom of Great Britain and Northern Ireland".

Although the United Kingdom is a sovereign country, England, Scotland, Wales and Northern Ireland are widely referred to as countries. The UK Prime Minister's website has used the phrase "countries within a country" to describe it. Some statistical summaries, such as those for the twelve NUTS 1 regions, refer to Scotland, Wales and Northern Ireland as "regions". Northern Ireland is also referred to as a "province". With regard to Northern Ireland, the descriptive name used "can be controversial, with the choice often revealing one's political preferences".

The term "Great Britain" conventionally refers to the island of Great Britain, or politically to England, Scotland and Wales in combination. It is sometimes used as a loose synonym for the United Kingdom as a whole. The word England is occasionally used incorrectly to refer to the United Kingdom as a whole, a mistake principally made by people from outside the UK.

The term "Britain" is used as a synonym for Great Britain, but also sometimes for the United Kingdom. Usage is mixed: the style guide of the UK Government prefers the term "UK" rather than "Britain" or "British" (except when referring to embassies (Note: "UK" embassies became "British" embassies in 1961.)), while other government documents acknowledge that both terms refer to the United Kingdom and that elsewhere "British government" is used at least as frequently as "United Kingdom government". The UK Permanent Committee on Geographical Names recognises "United Kingdom", "UK" and "U.K." as shortened and abbreviated geopolitical terms for the United Kingdom of Great Britain and Northern Ireland in its toponymic guidelines; it does not list "Britain" but notes that "it is only the one specific nominal term 'Great Britain' which invariably excludes Northern Ireland". The BBC historically preferred to use "Britain" as shorthand only for Great Britain, though the present style guide does not take a position except that "Great Britain" excludes Northern Ireland.

The adjective "British" is commonly used to refer to matters relating to the United Kingdom and is used in law to refer to United Kingdom citizenship and nationality. (Note: Historically, the term British was used to refer to members and institutions within the British Empire and later Commonwealth and was not limited to the geographical British Isles. The UK Government adopted the term for its exclusive use only in 1961, but in recognition of its wider usage first sought the prior consent of Australia, Canada and New Zealand.) People of the United Kingdom use several different terms to describe their national identity and may identify themselves as being British, English, Scottish, Welsh, Northern Irish or Irish; or as having a combination of different national identities.

== History ==
=== Prior to the Treaty of Union ===
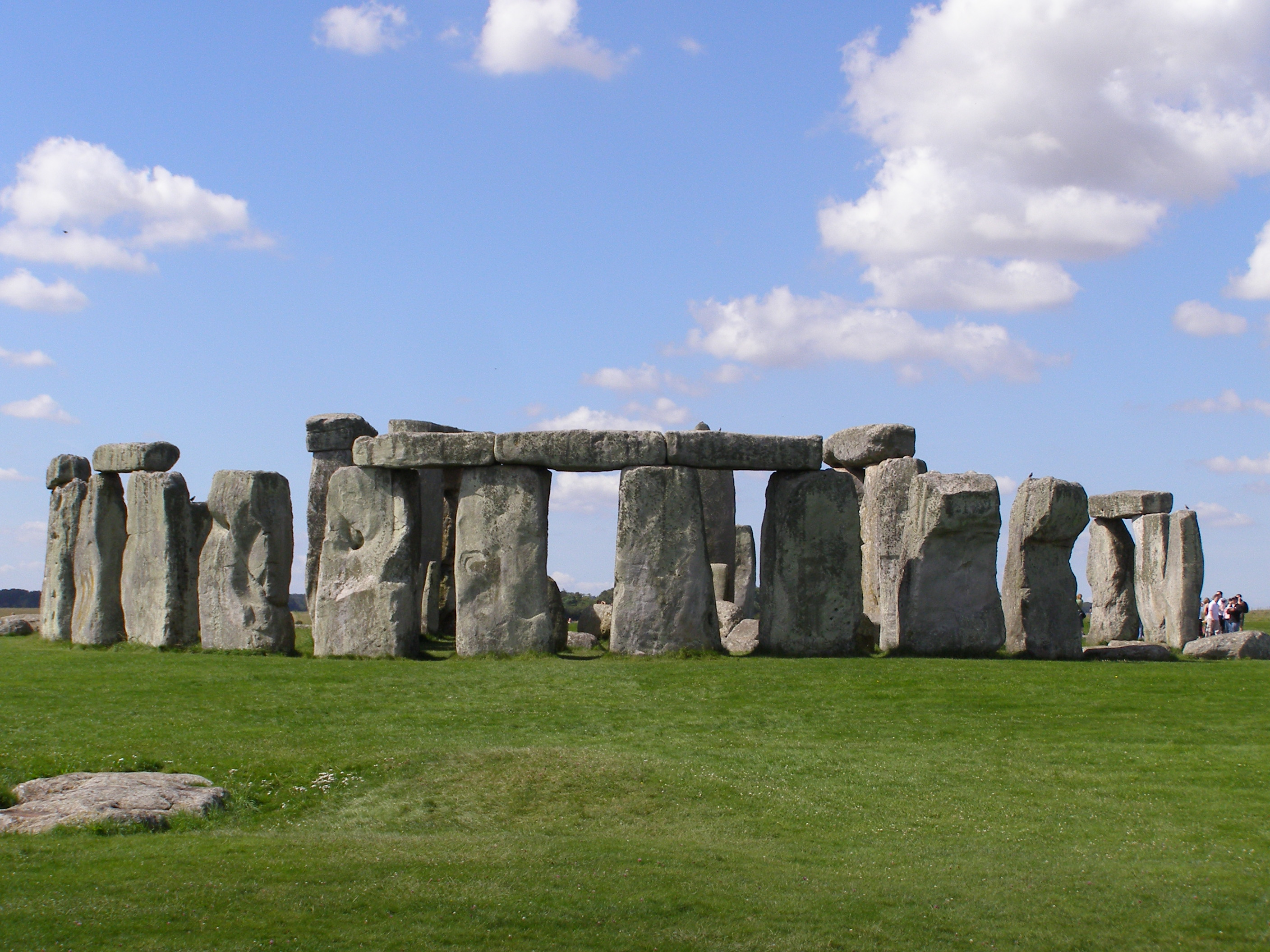
Stonehenge in Wiltshire is a ring of stones, each about 4 m (13 ft) high, 2 m (7 ft) wide and 25 tonnes, erected 2400–2200 BC.

Settlement by Cro-Magnons of what is now the United Kingdom occurred in waves beginning by about 30,000 years ago. The island has been continuously inhabited since the last retreat of ice around 11,500 years ago. By the end of the region's prehistoric period, the population is thought to have belonged largely to a culture termed Insular Celtic, comprising Brittonic Britain and Gaelic Ireland.

The Roman conquest, beginning in AD 43, and the 400-year rule of southern Britain, was followed by an invasion by Germanic Anglo-Saxon settlers, reducing the Brittonic area mainly to what was to become Wales, Cornwall and, until the latter stages of the Anglo-Saxon settlement, the Hen Ogledd (northern England and parts of southern Scotland). Most of the region settled by the Anglo-Saxons became unified as the Kingdom of England in the 10th century. Gaelic speakers in north-west Britain (with connections to the north-east of Ireland and traditionally supposed to have migrated from there in the 5th century) united with the Picts to create the Kingdom of Scotland in the 9th century.

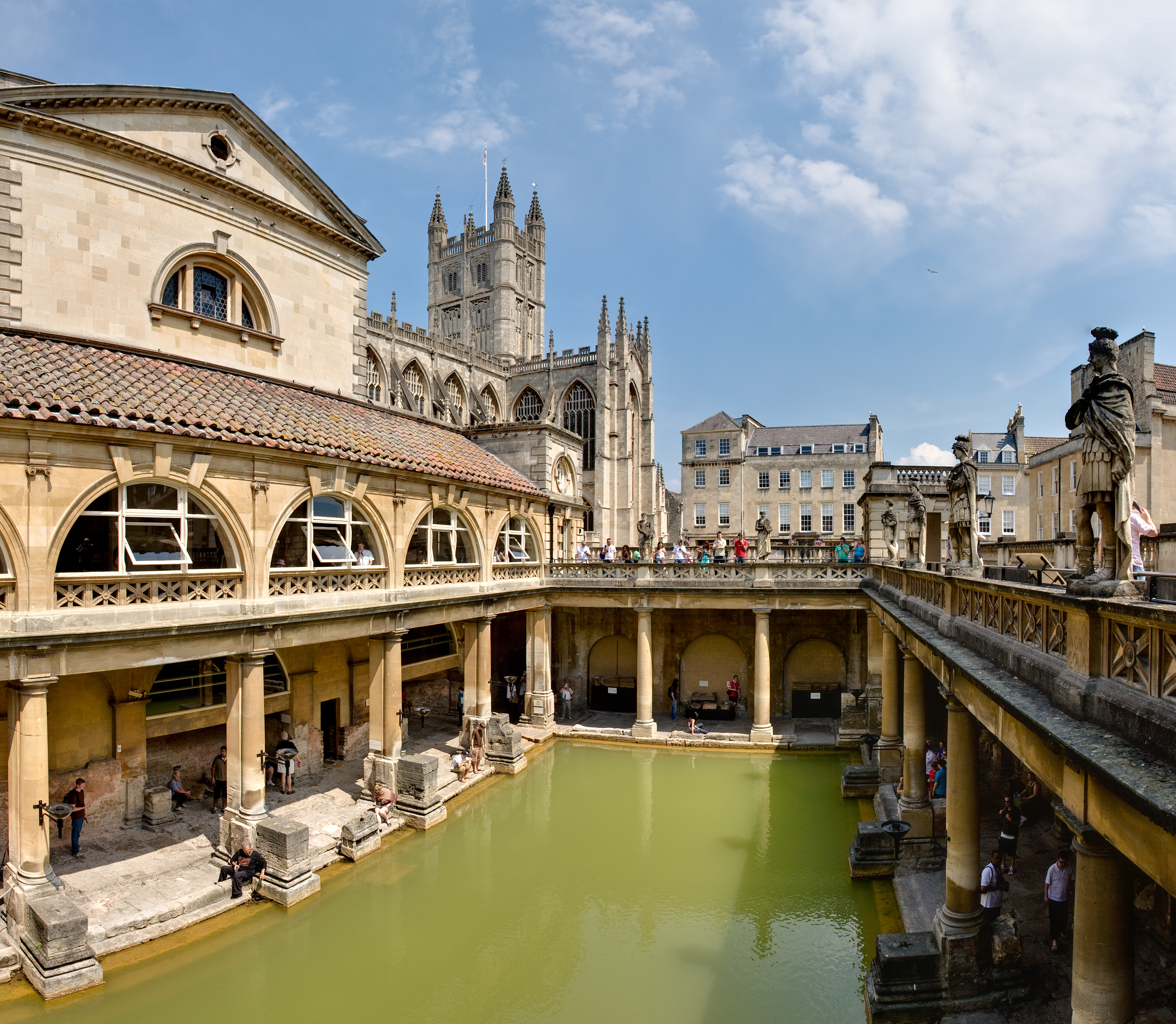
The Roman Baths in Bath, Somerset, are a well-preserved thermae from Roman Britain.

In 1066, the Normans invaded England from northern France. After conquering England they seized large parts of Wales, conquered much of Ireland and were invited to settle in Scotland, bringing to each country feudalism on the Northern French model and Norman-French culture. The Anglo-Norman ruling class greatly influenced, but eventually assimilated with, the local cultures. Subsequent medieval English kings completed the conquest of Wales and tried unsuccessfully to annex Scotland. Asserting its independence in the 1320 Declaration of Arbroath, Scotland maintained its independence thereafter, albeit in near-constant conflict with England.

In 1215, Magna Carta was the first document to state that no government was above the law and that citizens have rights protecting them.

The English monarchs, through inheritance of substantial territories in France and claims to the French crown, were also heavily involved in conflicts in France, most notably the Hundred Years' War, while the Kings of Scots were in an alliance with the French during this period. Early modern Britain saw religious conflict resulting from the Reformation and the introduction of Protestant state churches in each country. The English Reformation ushered in political, constitutional, social and cultural change in the 16th century and established the Church of England. It defined a national identity for England and slowly, but profoundly, changed people's religious beliefs. Wales was fully incorporated into the Kingdom of England, and Ireland was constituted as a kingdom in personal union with the English crown. During the Plantation of Ulster in the 17th century, the lands of the Catholic Gaelic nobility were confiscated by the Crown and granted to Protestant settlers from England and Scotland.

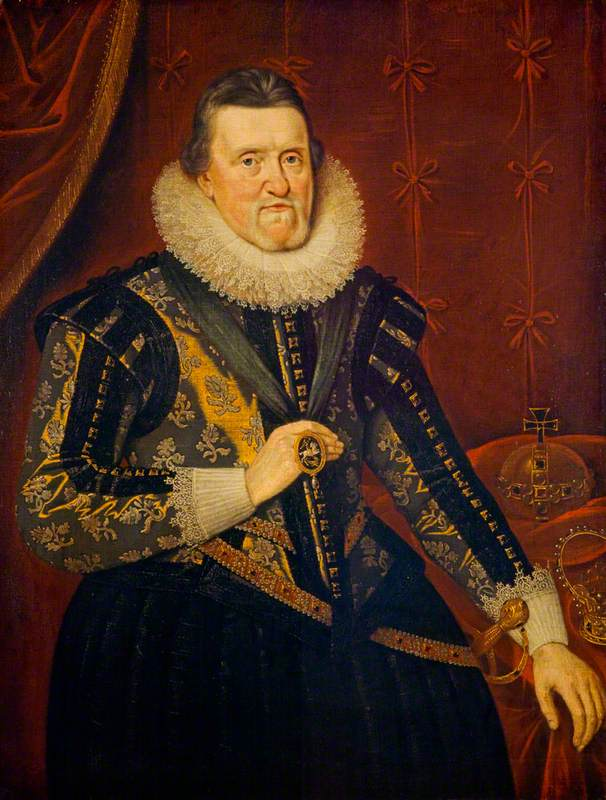
James VI, King of Scotland, succeeded to the English and Irish thrones in 1603.

The Union of the Crowns occurred in 1603 when James VI of Scotland inherited the thrones of England and Ireland, subsequently moving his court from Edinburgh to London. Although unified under a single monarch, the three realms remained entirely separate political entities, preserving their respective parliaments, judicial systems, and established churches.

By the mid-17th century, all three kingdoms were involved in a series of connected wars (including the English Civil War) which led to the temporary overthrow of the monarchy, with the execution of King Charles I, and the establishment of the short-lived unitary republic of the Commonwealth of England, Scotland and Ireland.

Although the monarchy was restored, the Interregnum along with the Glorious Revolution of 1688 and the subsequent Bill of Rights 1689 in England and Claim of Right Act 1689 in Scotland ensured that, unlike much of the rest of Europe, royal absolutism would not prevail, and a professed Catholic could never accede to the throne. The British constitution would develop on the basis of constitutional monarchy and the parliamentary system. With the founding of the Royal Society in 1660, science was greatly encouraged. During this period, particularly in England, the development of naval power and an interest in voyages of discovery led to the acquisition and settlement of overseas colonies, particularly in North America and the Caribbean.

Though previous attempts at uniting the two kingdoms within Great Britain in 1606, 1667 and 1689 had proved unsuccessful, the attempt initiated in 1705 led to the Treaty of Union of 1706 being agreed and ratified by both parliaments.

=== Union of England and Scotland ===
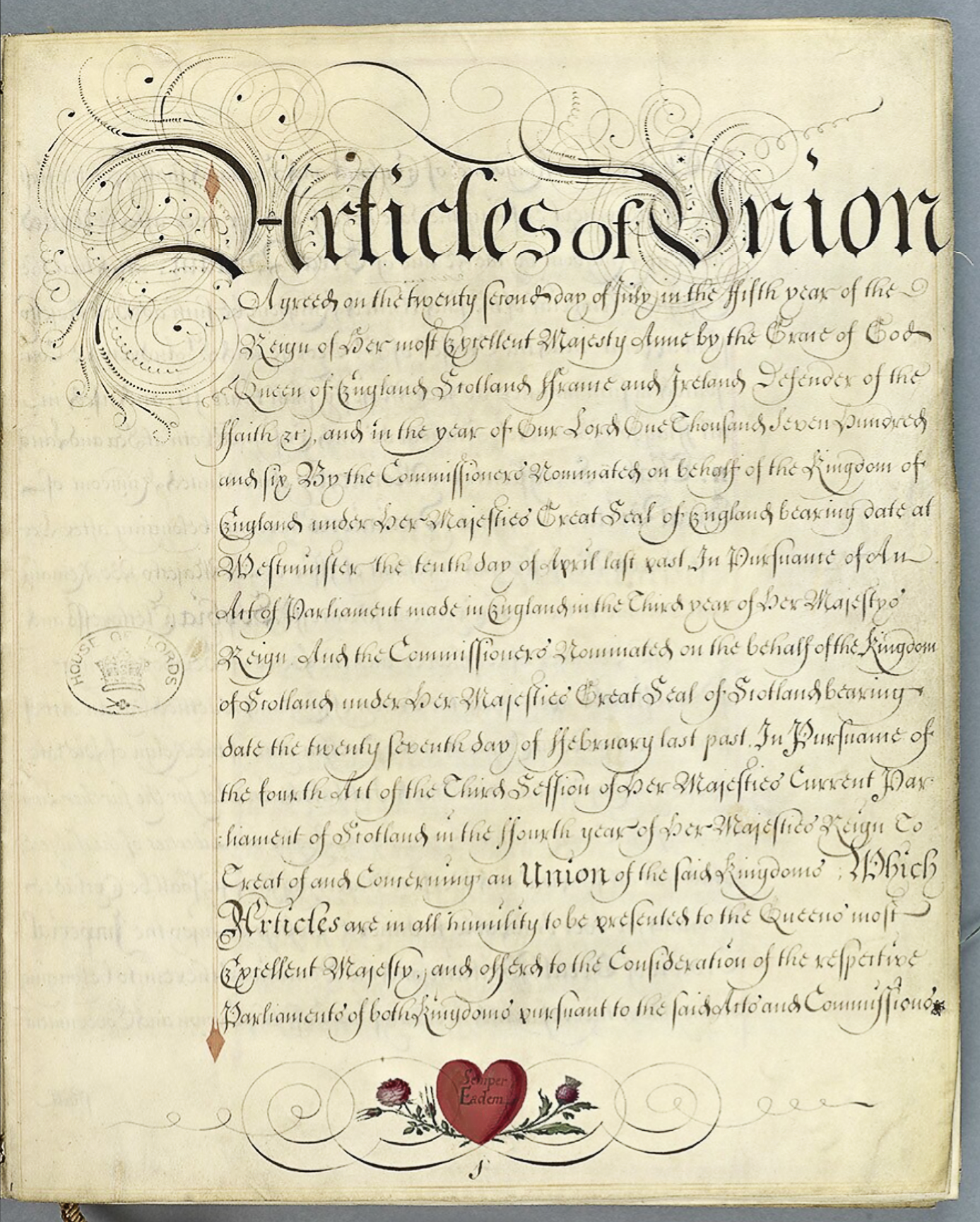
The Treaty of Union which unified the Kingdom of England and Kingdom of Scotland on 1 May 1707

On 1 May 1707 the Kingdom of Great Britain was formed, the result of the Acts of Union 1707 between the Kingdom of England and Kingdom of Scotland. In the 18th century cabinet government developed under Robert Walpole, who is considered the de facto first prime minister from 1721 to 1742. A series of Jacobite uprisings sought to remove the Protestant House of Hanover from the throne and restore the Catholic House of Stuart. In 1746, the Jacobites were defeated at the Battle of Culloden, after which the Scottish Highlanders were forcibly assimilated into Scotland by revoking the feudal independence of clan chiefs. The British colonies in North America that broke away in the American War of Independence became the United States. British imperial ambition turned towards Asia, particularly to India.

British merchants played a leading part in the Atlantic slave trade, mainly between 1662 and 1807 when British or British-colonial slave ships transported nearly 3.3 million slaves from Africa. The slaves were taken to work on plantations, principally in the Caribbean but also in North America. However, with pressure from the abolitionist movement, Parliament banned the trade in 1807, banned slavery in the British Empire in 1833, and Britain took a leading role in the movement to abolish slavery worldwide through the blockade of Africa and pressing other nations to end their trade with a series of treaties.

=== United Kingdom of Great Britain and Ireland ===
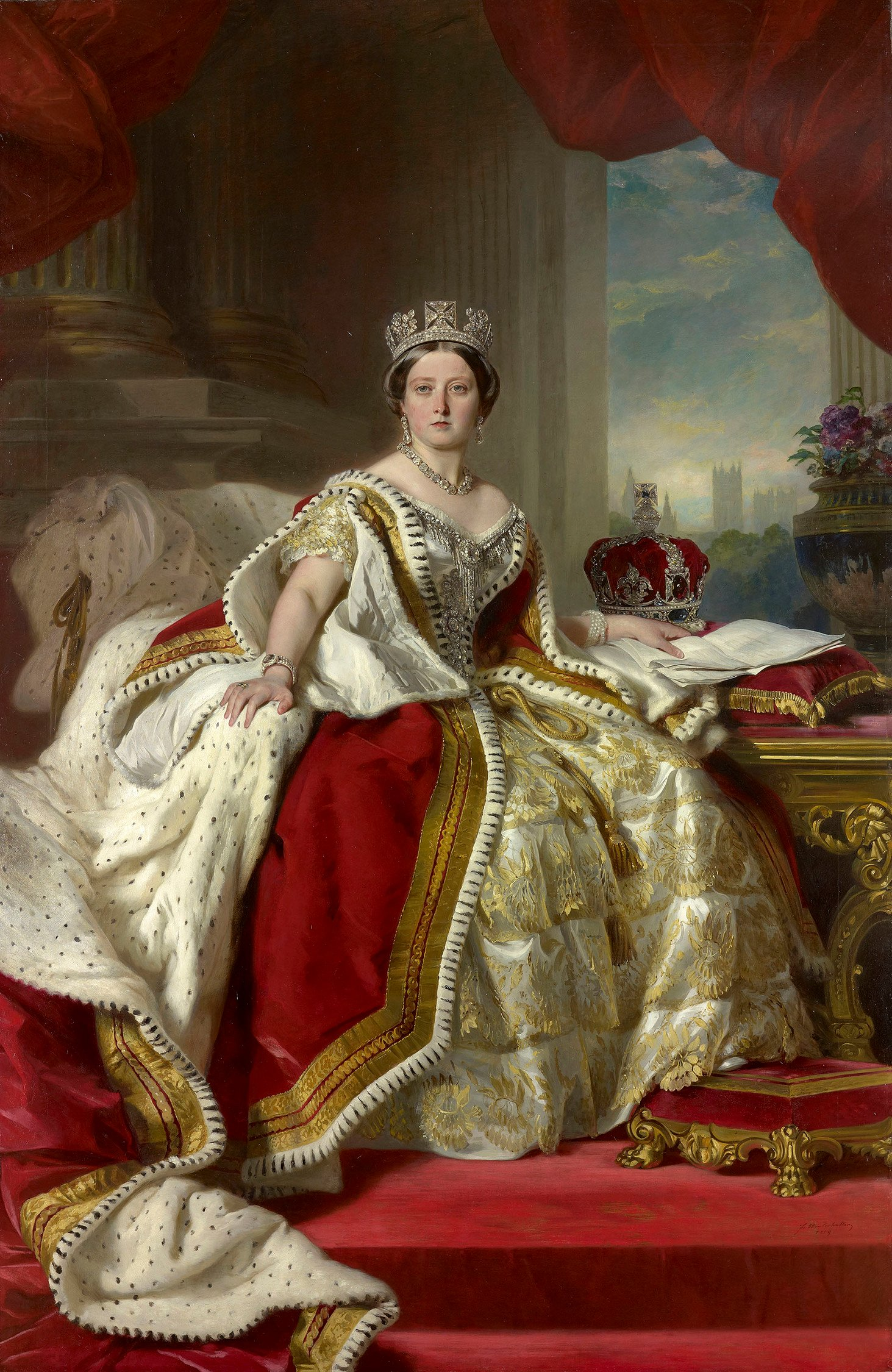
Victoria reigned as Queen of the United Kingdom and Empress of India during the 19th century.

In 1800, the parliaments of Great Britain and Ireland each passed an Act of Union, uniting the two kingdoms and creating the United Kingdom of Great Britain and Ireland on 1 January 1801.

After the defeat of France at the end of the French Revolutionary Wars and Napoleonic Wars (1792–1815), the United Kingdom emerged as the principal naval and imperial power (with London the largest city in the world from about 1830). Unchallenged at sea, British dominance was later described as the Pax Britannica ("British Peace"), a period of relative peace amongst the great powers (1815–1914) during which the British Empire became the global hegemon and adopted the role of global policeman. From 1853 to 1856, Britain took part in the Crimean War, allied with the Ottoman Empire against Tsarist Russia. Following the Indian Rebellion of 1857 the British government led by Lord Palmerston assumed direct rule over India. Alongside the formal control it exerted over its own colonies, British dominance of much of world trade meant that it effectively controlled the economies of regions such as East Asia and Latin America.

Throughout the Victorian era (1837–1901), political attitudes favoured free trade and laissez-faire policies. Beginning with the Great Reform Act in 1832, Parliament gradually widened the voting franchise, with the 1884 Reform Act championed by William Gladstone granting suffrage to a majority of males for the first time. The British population increased at a dramatic rate, accompanied by rapid urbanisation, causing significant social and economic stresses. By the late 19th century, Conservative governments under Benjamin Disraeli and Lord Salisbury accelerated imperial expansion in Africa, sustained a foreign policy of "splendid isolation" from European alliances, and intensified strategic containment of the Russian Empire in Central Asia, a competition known as the Great Game. During this time, Canada, Australia and New Zealand were granted self-governing dominion status. At the turn of the 20th century, Britain's industrial dominance became challenged by the German Empire and the United States. The Edwardian era (1901–1910) saw social reform and home rule for Ireland become important domestic issues, while the Labour Party emerged from an alliance of trade unions and small socialist groups in 1900, and suffragettes campaigned for women's right to vote.

=== World wars and partition of Ireland ===
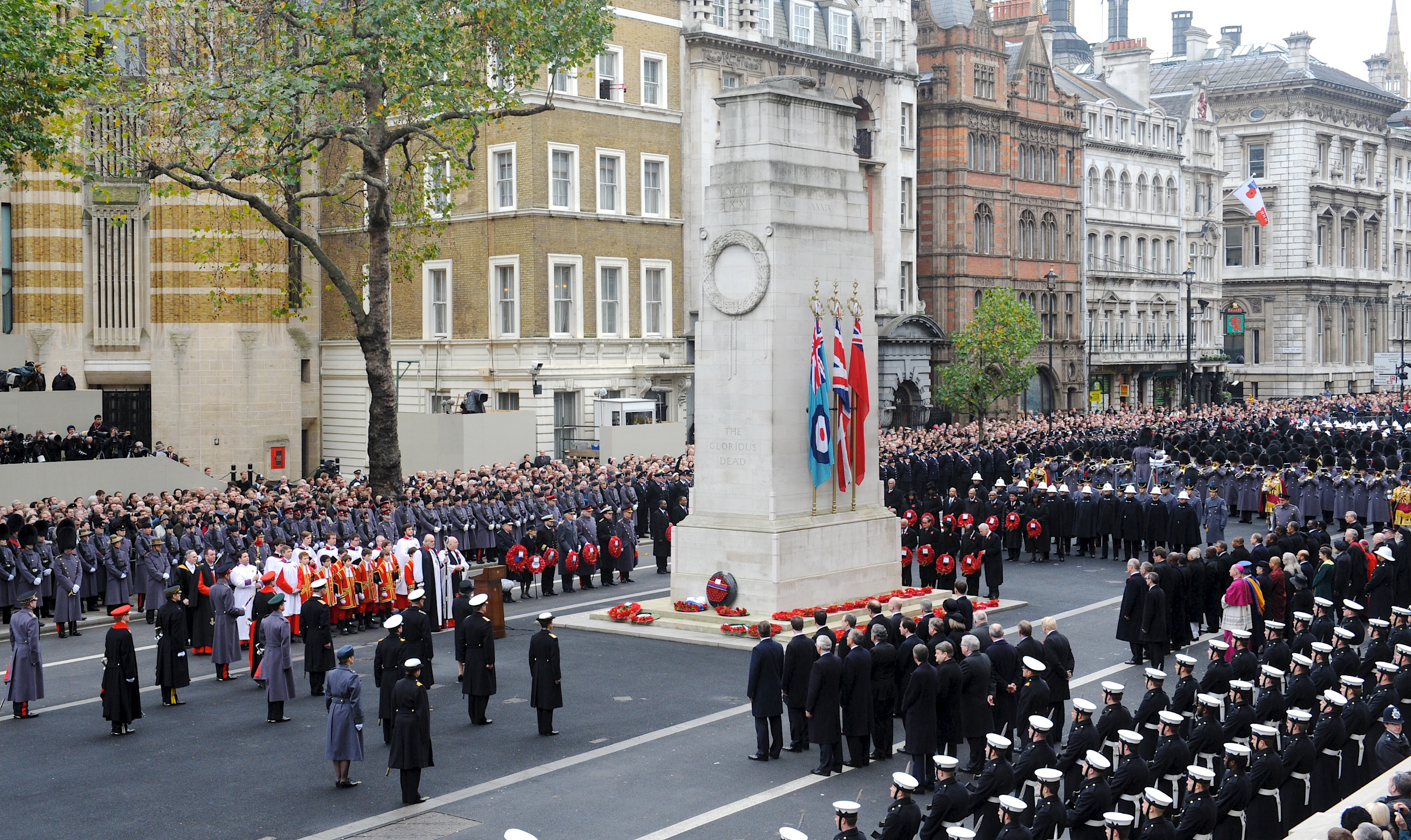
Wreaths being laid during the Remembrance Sunday service at the Cenotaph in Whitehall, London

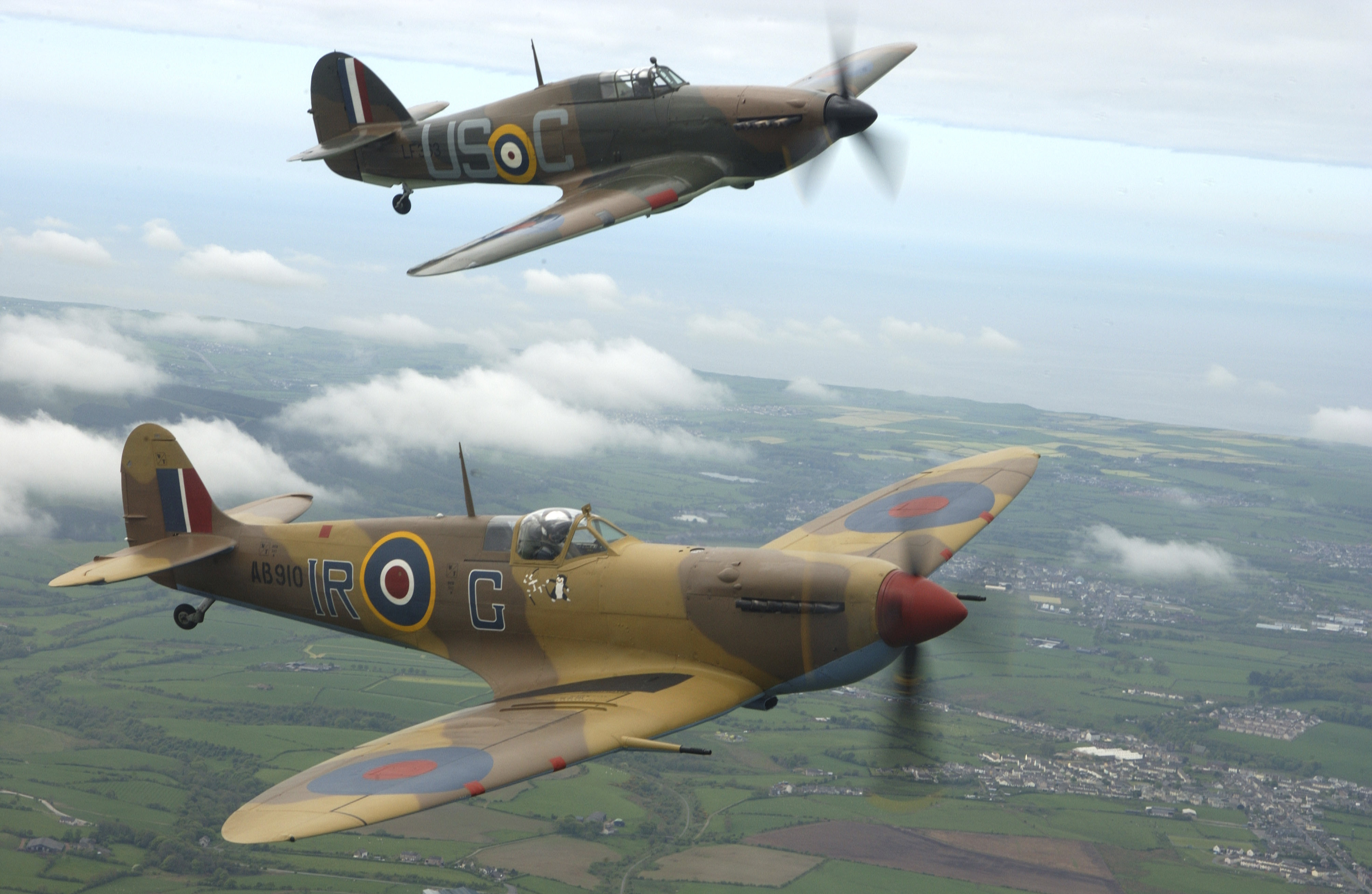
A Spitfire and a Hurricane as flown in the Battle of Britain during the Second World War

Britain was one of the principal Allies that defeated the Central Powers in the First World War (1914–1918). Alongside their French, Russian and (after 1917) American counterparts, British armed forces were engaged across much of the British Empire and in several regions of Europe, particularly on the Western Front. The high fatalities of trench warfare caused the loss of much of a generation of men, with lasting social effects in the nation and a great disruption in the social order. Britain had suffered 2.5 million casualties and finished the war with a huge national debt.

The consequences of the war persuaded the government to expand the right to vote in national and local elections to all adult men and most adult women with the Representation of the People Act 1918. After the war Britain became a permanent member of the Executive Council of the League of Nations and received a mandate over a number of former German and Ottoman colonies. Under the leadership of David Lloyd George, the British Empire reached its greatest extent, covering a fifth of the world's land surface and a quarter of its population.

By the mid-1920s, most of the British population could listen to BBC radio programmes. Experimental television broadcasts began in 1929 and the first scheduled BBC Television Service commenced in 1936. The rise of Irish nationalism, and disputes within Ireland over the terms of Irish Home Rule, led eventually to the partition of the island in 1921. A period of conflict in what is now Northern Ireland occurred from June 1920 until June 1922. The Irish Free State became independent, initially with Dominion status in 1922, and unambiguously independent in 1931. Northern Ireland remained part of the United Kingdom. The 1928 Equal Franchise Act gave women electoral equality with men in national elections. Strikes in the mid-1920s culminated in the General Strike of 1926. Still suffering from the long-term economic effects of the First World War, Britain was severely impacted by the Great Depression (1929–1932), which intensified hardship in old industrial areas in traditional sectors, led to mass unemployment peaking near 3 million, and precipitated widespread political instability and social unrest. A coalition government was formed in 1931.

Nonetheless, Britain was described as "a very wealthy country, formidable in arms, ruthless in pursuit of its interests and sitting at the heart of a global production system." After Nazi Germany's invasion of Poland in 1939, Britain entered the Second World War. Despite the defeat of its European allies in the first year, Britain and its empire continued the war against Germany.

In 1940, the Royal Air Force successfully defended British airspace by repelling the German Luftwaffe in the Battle of Britain. Urban areas suffered heavy bombing during the Blitz. The Grand Alliance of Britain, the United States and the Soviet Union formed in 1941, leading the Allies against the Axis powers. There were eventual hard-fought victories in the Battle of the Atlantic, the North Africa campaign and the Italian campaign. British forces played important roles in the Normandy landings of 1944 and the liberation of Europe. The British Army led the Burma campaign against Japan, and the British Pacific Fleet fought Japan at sea. British scientists contributed to the American Manhattan Project, whose task was to build a nuclear weapon.

=== Post-war 20th century ===
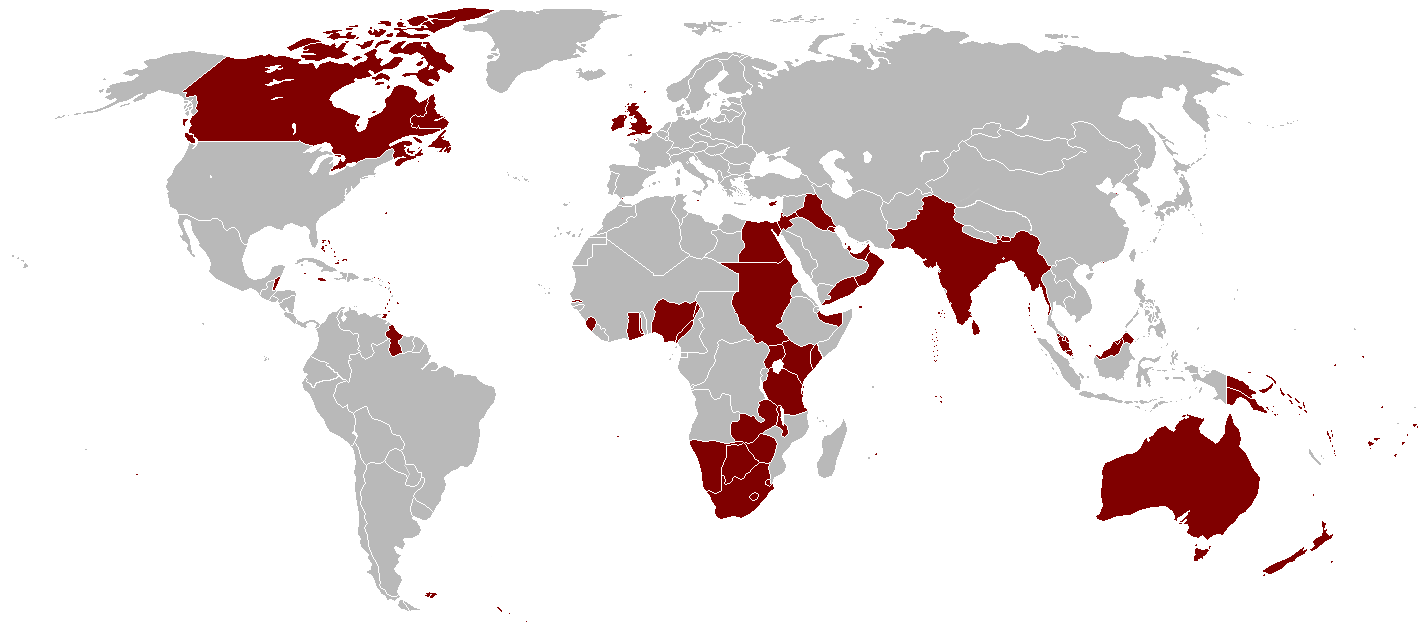
The British Empire at its territorial peak in 1921

The United Kingdom was one of the Big Three powers (with the United States and the Soviet Union) who met to plan the post-war world; it drafted the Declaration by United Nations with the United States and became one of the five permanent members of the United Nations Security Council. It worked closely with the United States to establish the International Monetary Fund, the World Bank and NATO. The war left the UK severely weakened and financially dependent on the American Marshall Plan, but it was spared the total war that devastated eastern Europe.

In the immediate post-war years the Labour government under Clement Attlee initiated a radical programme of reforms, which significantly affected British society in the following decades. Major industries and public utilities were nationalised, a welfare state was established, and a comprehensive, publicly funded healthcare system, the National Health Service, was created. The rise of nationalism in the colonies coincided with Britain's much-diminished economic position after its involvement in the First World War and in the Second World War, so that a policy of decolonisation was unavoidable. Independence was granted to India and Pakistan in 1947. Over the next three decades, most colonies of the British Empire gained their independence, and many became members of the Commonwealth of Nations.

The UK was the third country to develop a nuclear weapons arsenal, with its first atomic bomb test, Operation Hurricane, in 1952, although the post-war limitations of Britain's international role were illustrated by the Suez Crisis of 1956. As a result of a shortage of workers in the 1950s, the government encouraged immigration from Commonwealth countries. In the following decades the UK became a more multiracial and multicultural society. Despite rising living standards in the late 1950s and 1960s, the United Kingdom's economic performance was less successful than many of its main competitors such as France, West Germany and Japan. In 1969, the United Kingdom was the first democratic nation to lower its voting age to 18.

In the decades-long process of European integration the UK was a founding member of the Western European Union, established with the London and Paris Conferences in 1954. In 1960 the UK was one of the seven founding members of the European Free Trade Association (EFTA), but in 1973 it left to join the European Communities (EC). In a 1975 referendum 67 per cent voted to stay in it. When the EC became the European Union (EU) in 1993, the UK was one of the 12 founding member states.

From the late 1960s, Northern Ireland experienced communal and paramilitary violence, sometimes affecting other parts of the UK, known as the Troubles. It is usually considered to have ended with the 1998 Belfast "Good Friday" Agreement. Following a period of widespread economic slowdown and industrial strife in the 1970s, the Conservative government of the 1980s led by Margaret Thatcher initiated a radical policy of monetarism, deregulation, particularly of the financial sector (for example, the Big Bang in 1986) and labour markets, the sale of state-owned companies (privatisation), and the withdrawal of subsidies to others.

In 1982, Argentina invaded the British territories of South Georgia and the Falkland Islands, leading to the 10-week Falklands War in which Argentine forces were defeated. The inhabitants of the islands strongly favour British sovereignty, expressed in a 2013 referendum. From 1984 the British economy was helped by the inflow of substantial North Sea oil revenues. Another British Overseas Territory, Gibraltar, is a key military base; a referendum in 2002 on shared sovereignty with Spain was rejected.

By the late 20th century, major changes were made to the governance of the UK with the establishment of devolved administrations for Scotland, Wales and Northern Ireland. The statutory incorporation followed acceptance of the European Convention on Human Rights. The UK remained a great power with global diplomatic and military influence and a leading role in the United Nations and NATO.

=== 21st century ===
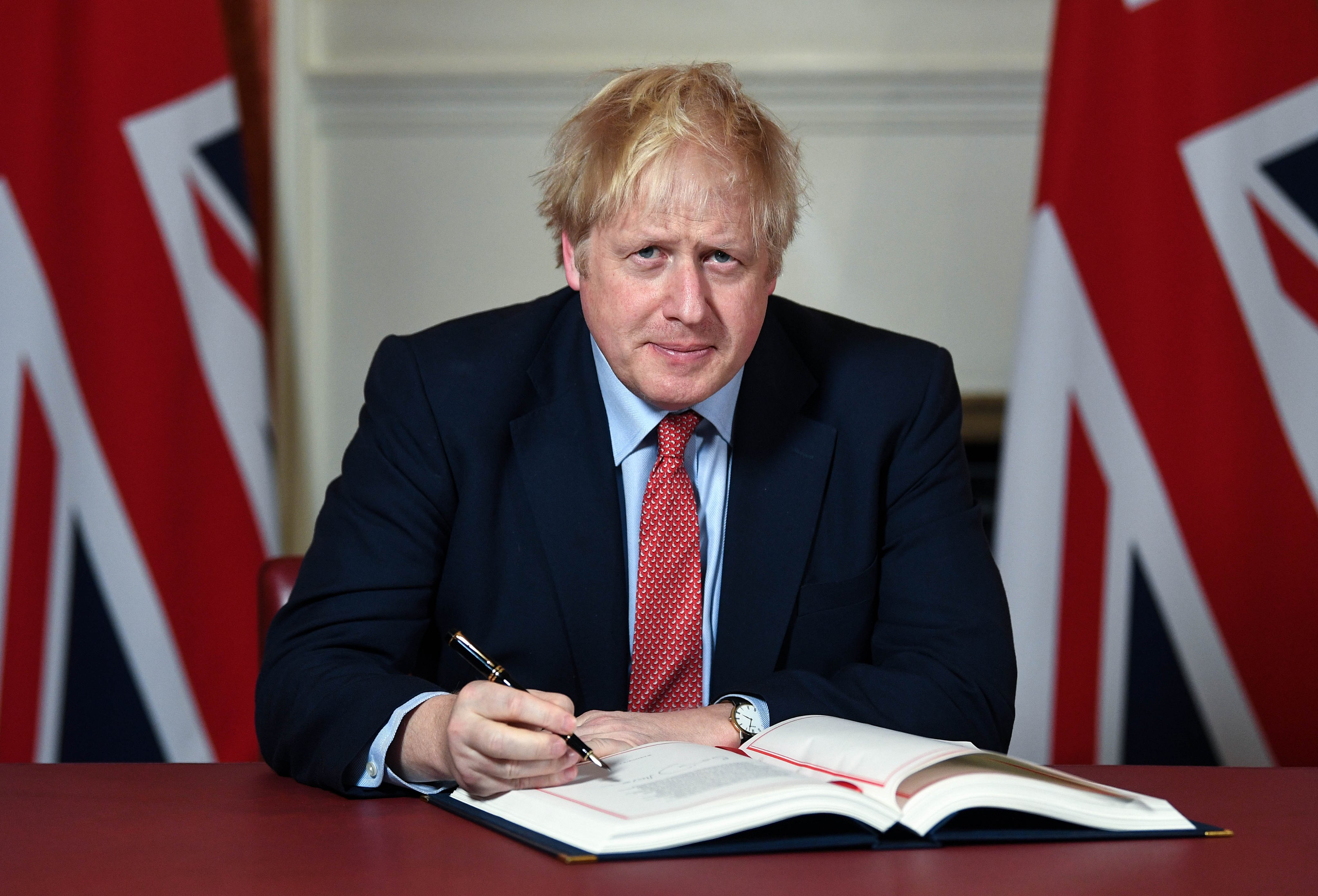
Prime Minister Boris Johnson signs the Brexit withdrawal agreement in 2020, formally withdrawing the UK from the European Union (EU).

The United Kingdom broadly supported the United States' approach to the "war on terror" in the early 21st century. British troops fought in the war in Afghanistan, but controversy surrounded Britain's military deployment in Iraq War, which saw the largest protest in British history in opposition to the government led by Tony Blair.

The Great Recession (2007–2010) severely affected the British economy, and was followed by a period of weak growth and stagnation. The Cameron–Clegg coalition government of 2010 introduced austerity measures intended to tackle the substantial public deficits. A referendum on Scottish independence in 2014 resulted in the Scottish electorate voting by 55.3 to 44.7 per cent to remain part of the United Kingdom.

In 2016, 51.9 per cent of voters in the UK voted to leave the European Union (EU). The UK left the EU in 2020. On 1 May 2021 the EU–UK Trade and Cooperation Agreement, a free trade agreement between the UK and the EU, came into force.

The COVID-19 pandemic had a severe impact on the British economy, caused major disruptions to education and had far-reaching impacts on society and politics in 2020 and 2021. The United Kingdom was the first country in the world to use an approved COVID-19 vaccine. Developing a vaccine in the UK allowed the rollout to be amongst the fastest in the world.

== Geography ==
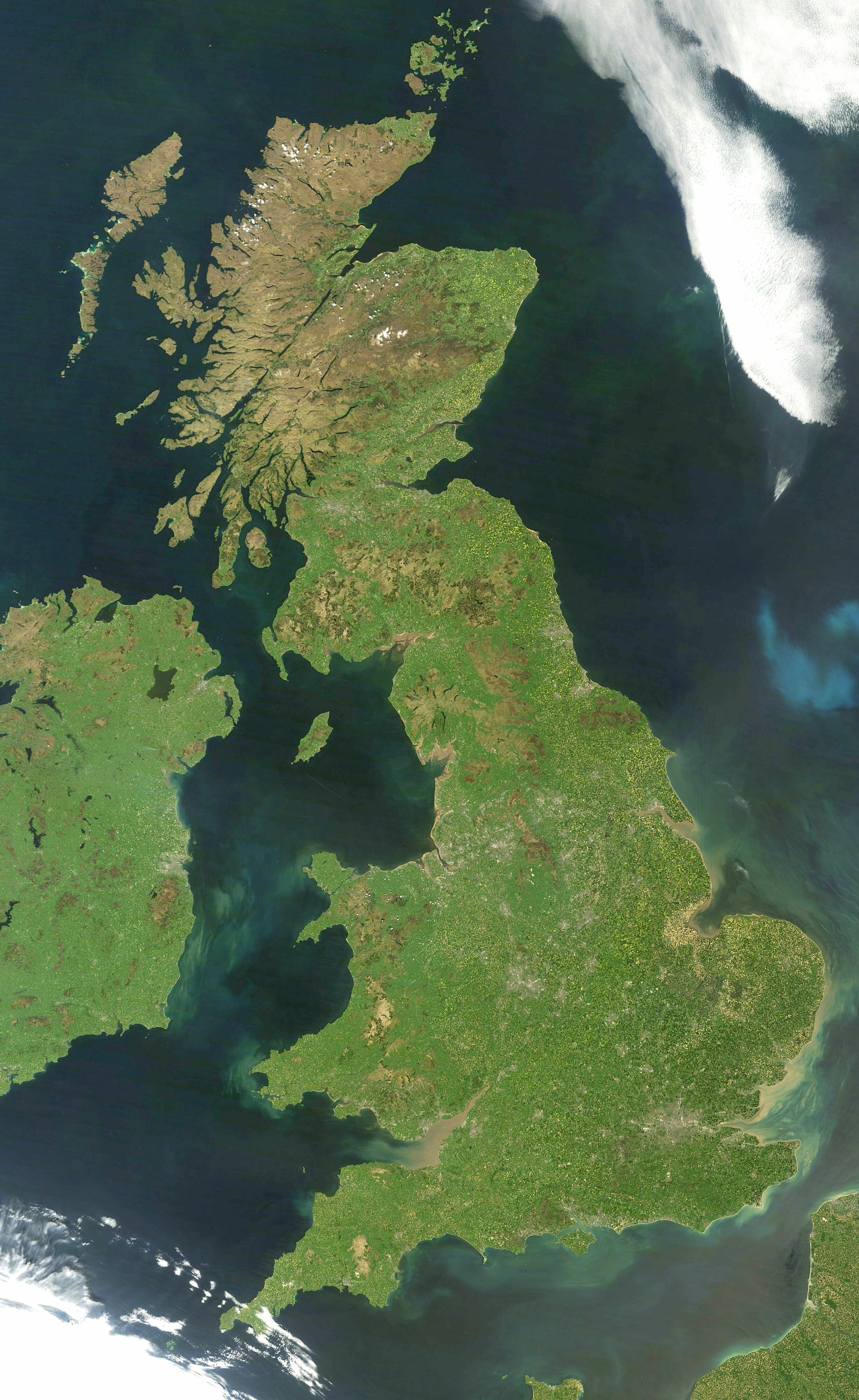
A satellite image of the United Kingdom excluding Shetland

The total area of the United Kingdom is approximately 94,354 square miles (244,376 km^{2}), with a land area of 93,723 square miles (242,741 km^{2}). It occupies the major part of the British Isles and includes the island of Great Britain, the north-eastern one-sixth of the island of Ireland and some smaller surrounding islands, meaning it comprises England, Scotland, Wales and Northern Ireland.

Geographically, the United Kingdom lies between the North Atlantic Ocean and the North Sea with the southeast coast coming within 22 miles (35 km) of the coast of northern France, from which it is separated by the English Channel.

The nearby island polities of the Isle of Man, Jersey and Guernsey are Crown Dependencies, in union with the British monarch, but do not strictly form part of the United Kingdom or any of its three jurisdictions or four countries, although the British government retains responsibility for their external affairs. The Isle of Man lies roughly midway between Great Britain and the island of Ireland in the Irish Sea, while the Channel Islands lie just off the northern French coast.

The Royal Greenwich Observatory in London was chosen as the defining point of the Prime Meridian at the International Meridian Conference in 1884.

The UK lies between latitudes 49° and 61° N, and longitudes 9° W and 2° E. Northern Ireland shares a 310-mile (499 km) land boundary with the Republic of Ireland and has a 404-mile (650 km) coastline. The length of coastline of Great Britain plus its principal islands is about 19,491 miles (31,368 km) long, with the coastline of the main island Great Britain being 11,073 miles (17,820 km) of that, though measurements can vary greatly due to the coastline paradox. It is connected to continental Europe by the Channel Tunnel, which at 31 miles (50 km) (24 miles (38 km) underwater) is the longest underwater tunnel in the world.

The UK contains four terrestrial ecoregions: Celtic broadleaf forests, English Lowlands beech forests, North Atlantic moist mixed forests, and Caledonian conifer forests. The area of woodland in the UK was estimated to be 3.25 million hectares in 2023, which represents 13 per cent of its land area.

=== Climate ===
Most of the United Kingdom has a temperate climate, with generally cool temperatures and plentiful rainfall all year round. The temperature varies with the seasons rarely dropping below 0 °C (32 °F) or rising above 30 °C (86 °F). Some parts, away from the coast, of upland England, Wales, Northern Ireland and most of Scotland, experience a subpolar oceanic climate. Higher elevations in Scotland experience a continental subarctic climate and the mountains experience a tundra climate.

The prevailing wind is from the southwest and bears frequent spells of mild and wet weather from the Atlantic Ocean, although the eastern parts are mostly sheltered from this wind. Since the majority of the rain falls over the western regions, the eastern parts are the driest. Atlantic currents, warmed by the Gulf Stream, bring mild winters, especially in the west where winters are wet and even more so over high ground. Summers are warmest in the southeast of England and coolest in the north. Heavy snowfall can occur in winter and early spring on high ground, and occasionally settles to great depth away from the hills.

The average total annual sunshine in the United Kingdom was 1,339.7 hours between 1971 and 2000. The hours of sunshine vary from 1,200 to about 1,580 hours per year.

Climate change has serious impacts on the country. A third of food price rise in 2023 was attributed to it. In 2024 the United Kingdom ranked 5th out of 180 countries in the Environmental Performance Index. A law has been passed that UK greenhouse gas emissions will be net zero by 2050.

=== Topography ===
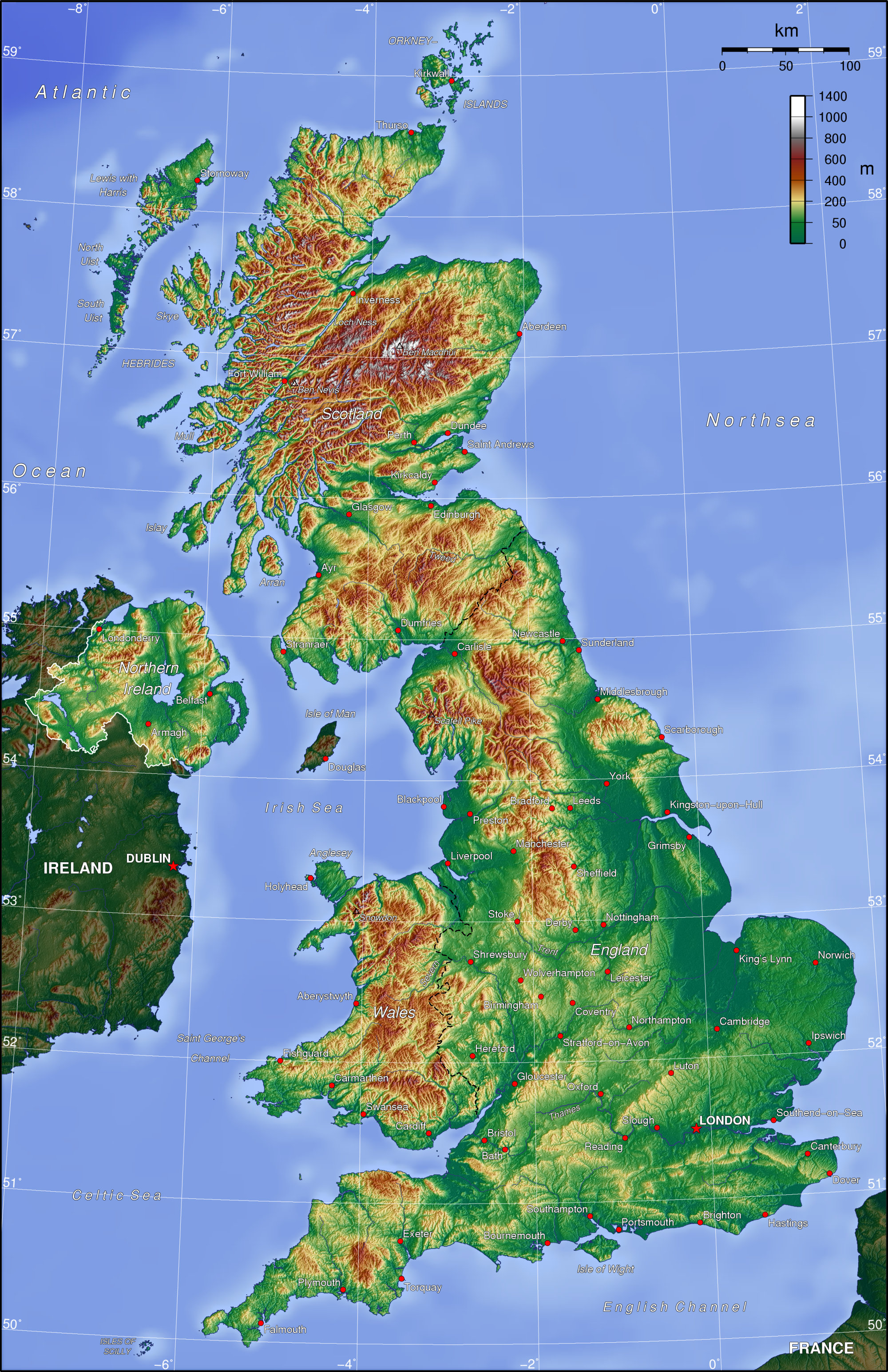
The United Kingdom's topography

England accounts for 53 per cent of the UK, covering 50,350 square miles (130,395 km^{2}). Most of the country consists of lowland terrain, with upland and mountainous terrain northwest of the Tees–Exe line which roughly divides the UK into lowland and upland areas. Lowland areas include Cornwall, the New Forest, the South Downs and the Norfolk Broads. Upland areas include the Lake District, the Pennines, the Yorkshire Dales, Exmoor and Dartmoor. The main rivers and estuaries are the Thames, Severn, and the Humber. England's highest mountain is Scafell Pike, at 978 metres (3,209 ft) in the Lake District; its largest island is the Isle of Wight.

Scotland accounts for 32 per cent of the UK, covering 30,410 square miles (78,772 km^{2}). This includes nearly 800 islands, notably the Hebrides, Orkney Islands and Shetland Islands. Scotland is the most mountainous constituent country of the UK. The Highlands to the north and west are the more rugged region containing the majority of Scotland's mountainous land, including the Cairngorms, Loch Lomond and The Trossachs and Ben Nevis which at 1,345 metres (4,413 ft) is the highest point in the British Isles.

Wales accounts for less than 9 per cent of the UK, covering 8,020 square miles (20,779 km^{2}). It is mostly mountainous, though South Wales is less mountainous than North and Mid Wales. The highest mountains in Wales are in Snowdonia and include Snowdon (Welsh: Yr Wyddfa) which, at 1,085 metres (3,560 ft), is the highest peak in Wales. Wales has over 1,680 miles (2,704 kilometres) of coastline including the Pembrokeshire Coast. Several islands lie off the Welsh mainland, the largest of which is Anglesey (Ynys Môn).

Northern Ireland, separated from Great Britain by the Irish Sea and North Channel, has an area of 5,470 square miles (14,160 km^{2}) and is mostly hilly. It includes Lough Neagh which, at 150 square miles (388 km^{2}), is the largest lake in the British Isles by area, Lough Erne, which has over 150 islands, and the Giant's Causeway, which is listed by UNESCO as a World Heritage Site. The highest peak in Northern Ireland is Slieve Donard in the Mourne Mountains at 852 metres (2,795 ft).

== Government and politics ==
Charles III
King

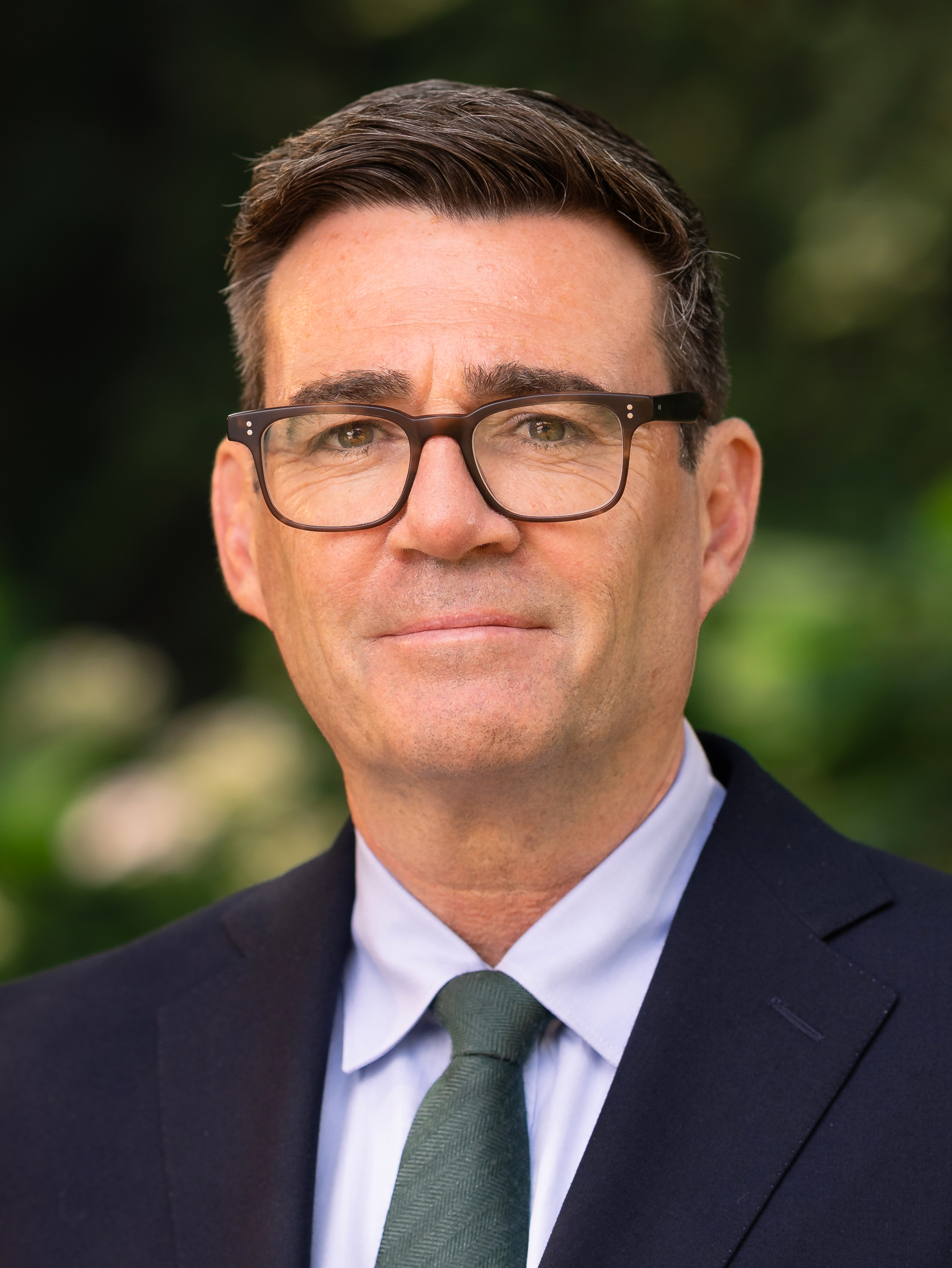
Andy Burnham
Prime Minister

The United Kingdom is a constitutional monarchy and a parliamentary democracy operating under the Westminster system, otherwise known as a "democratic parliamentary monarchy". It is a centralised, unitary state wherein the Parliament of the United Kingdom is sovereign. Parliament is made up of the elected House of Commons, the appointed House of Lords and the Crown (as personified by the monarch). (Note: British sovereignty derives from the Crown, a corporation sole occupied by the monarch. It is therefore by and through the monarch that Parliament exercises supreme legislative authority over both the executive and judiciary. Distinguished Professor of Public Law Maurice Sunkin opined the Crown symbolically occupies "...what in other places would be a core element of a written constitution." As a result of this state of constitutional affairs, the monarch is formally referred to as "the Sovereign" in legislation.) The main business of Parliament takes place in the two houses, but royal assent is required for a bill to become an act of Parliament (that is, statute law). As a result of parliamentary sovereignty, the British constitution is uncodified, consisting mostly of disparate written sources, including parliamentary statutes, judge-made case law and international treaties, together with constitutional conventions. Nevertheless, the Supreme Court recognises a number of principles underlying the British constitution, such as parliamentary sovereignty, the rule of law, democracy and upholding international law.

King Charles III is the monarch and head of state of the United Kingdom and 14 other independent sovereign states, referred to as "Commonwealth realms". The monarch is formally vested with all executive authority as the personal embodiment of the Crown and is "fundamental to the law and working of government in the UK". The disposition of such powers however, including those belonging to the royal prerogative, is generally exercised only on the advice of ministers of the Crown responsible to Parliament and thence to the electorate. Nevertheless, in the performance of official duties the monarch has "the right to be consulted, the right to encourage, and the right to warn". In addition the monarch has a number of reserve powers at his disposal to uphold responsible government and prevent constitutional crises. (Note: For instance, the monarch alone appoints a member of Parliament as prime minister based on their ability to command the confidence of the House of Commons. The monarch also regularly confers state honours in the personal gift of the Crown. In exceptional circumstances, the monarch may dismiss the prime minister, refuse a request to dissolve or prorogue Parliament, withhold royal assent to primary legislation, and prevent illegal use of the British Armed Forces, amongst other reserve powers.)

The prime minister is the head of government in the United Kingdom. Acting under the direction and supervision of a Cabinet of senior ministers selected and led by the prime minister, His Majesty's Government serves as the principal instrument for public policymaking, administers public services and, through the Privy Council, promulgates statutory instruments and tenders advice to the monarch. Nearly all prime ministers have served concurrently as First Lord of the Treasury and all prime ministers have continuously served as First Lord of the Treasury since 1905, Minister for the Civil Service since 1968, and Minister for the Union since 2019. While appointed by the monarch, in modern times the prime minister is, by convention, an MP, the leader of the political party with the most seats in the House of Commons, and holds office by virtue of their ability to command the confidence of the House of Commons. The prime minister as of 20 July 2026 is Andy Burnham, the leader of the Labour Party.

Although not part of the United Kingdom, the three Crown Dependencies of Jersey, Guernsey and the Isle of Man, as well as the 14 British Overseas Territories, are subject to the sovereignty of the British Crown.

Democratic backsliding was found by the 2026 V-Dem Democracy Report for the United Kingdom.

=== Elections ===
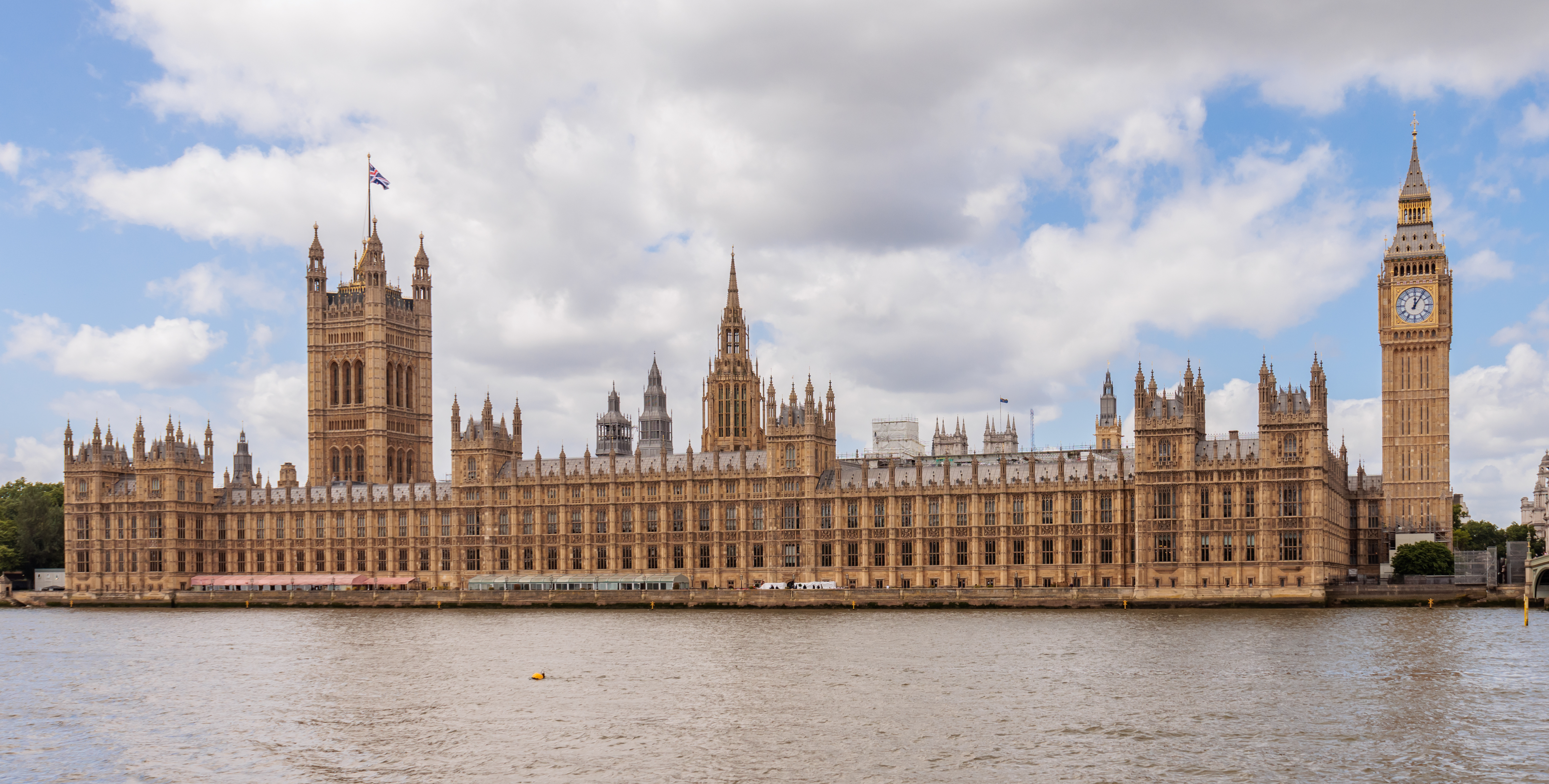
The Palace of Westminster in London is the seat of both houses of the Parliament of the United Kingdom.

For general elections (elections to the House of Commons), the United Kingdom is divided into 650 constituencies, each of which is represented by one member of Parliament (MP) elected by the first-past-the-post system. MPs hold office for up to five years and must then stand for re-election if they wish to continue to be an MP. The Conservative Party, colloquially known as the Tory Party or the Tories, and the Labour Party have been the dominant political parties in the country since the 1920s, leading to the UK being described as a two-party system. However, since the 1920s other political parties have won seats in the House of Commons, although never more than the Conservatives or Labour. The 2020s marked the erosion of the two-party system and the growth of a multi-party system.

=== Administrative divisions ===
The four countries of the United Kingdom

The geographical division of the United Kingdom into counties or shires began in England and Scotland in the early Middle Ages, and was completed throughout Great Britain and Ireland by the early modern period. Modern local government by elected councils, partly based on the ancient counties, was established by separate Acts of Parliament: in England and Wales in 1888, Scotland in 1889 and Ireland in 1898, meaning there is no consistent system of administrative or geographic demarcation across the UK, and England and Wales, Scotland and Northern Ireland each have their own distinct jurisdictions. Until the 19th century there was little change to those arrangements, but there has since been a constant evolution of role and function.

Local government in England is complex, with the distribution of functions varying according to local arrangements. The upper-tier subdivisions of England are the nine regions, used primarily for statistical purposes. One of the regions, Greater London, has had a directly elected assembly and mayor since 2000 following popular support for the proposal in a 1998 referendum.

Local government in Scotland is divided into 32 council areas with a wide variation in size and population. The cities of Glasgow, Edinburgh, Aberdeen and Dundee are separate council areas, as is the Highland Council, which includes a third of Scotland's area but only just over 200,000 people. Local councils are made up of elected councillors, of whom there are 1,223.

Local government in Wales consists of 22 unitary authorities, each led by a leader and cabinet elected by the council itself. These include the cities of Cardiff, Swansea and Newport, which are unitary authorities in their own right. Elections are held every four years under the first-past-the-post system.

Local government in Northern Ireland since 2015 has been organised into 11 district councils, each elected by single transferable vote. Their powers are limited to services such as waste collection, dog control, and maintaining parks and cemeteries. This system was introduced after a 2008 decision by the executive to replace the previous structure of 26 districts which had been in place since 1973.

=== Devolution ===
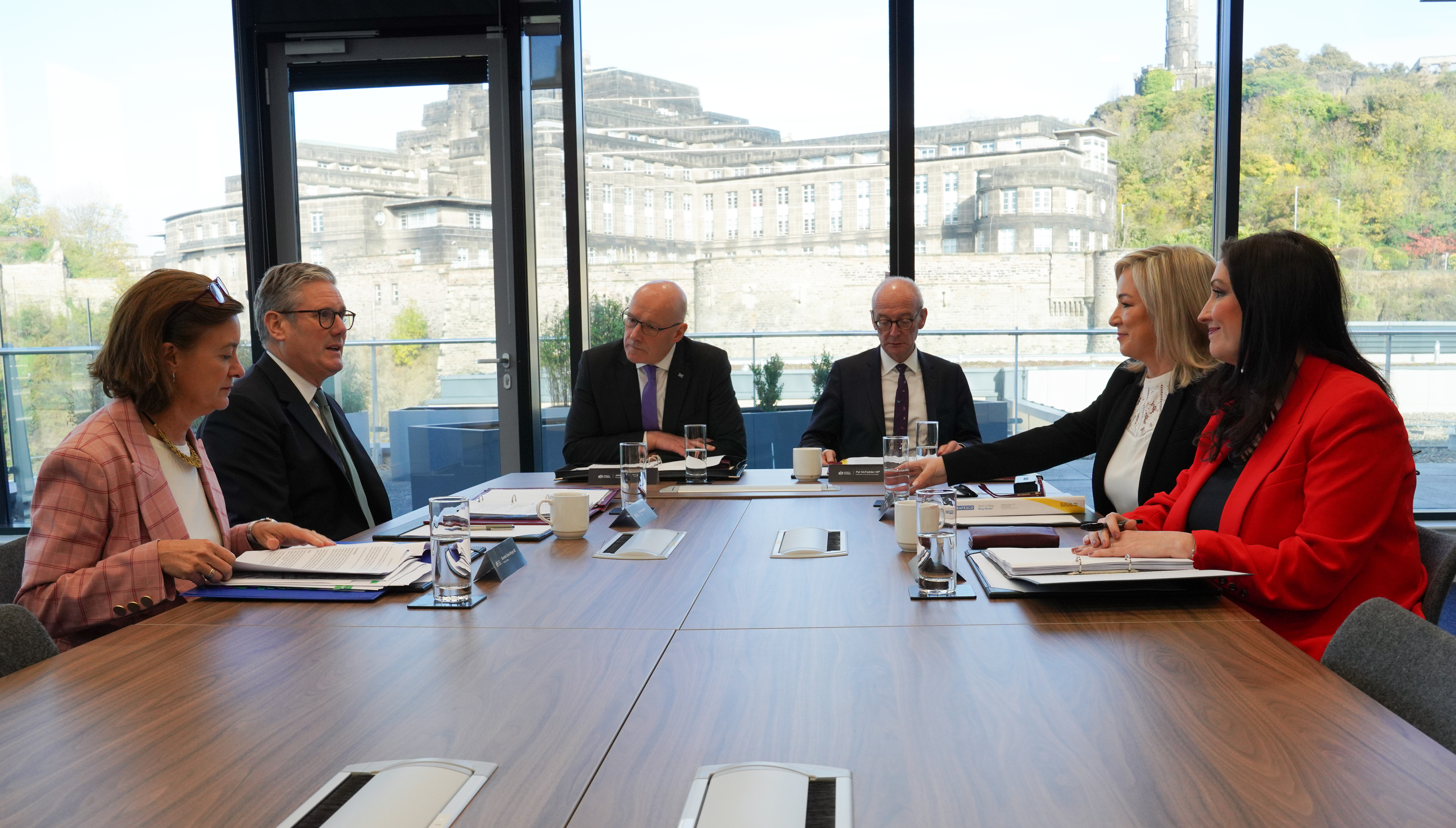
Prime Minister Keir Starmer meets with the first ministers of Scotland, Northern Ireland and Wales during the Council of Nations and Regions summit.

In the United Kingdom a process of devolution has transferred various powers from the UK Government to three of the four UK countries—Scotland, Northern Ireland and Wales, which since 1999, have their own governments and parliaments that control various devolved matters. These powers vary and have been moved to the Scottish Government, the Welsh Government, the Northern Ireland Executive and (in England) to strategic authorities: the Greater London Authority, combined authorities, and combined county authorities. Amongst the devolved parliaments across the United Kingdom, the Scottish Parliament has the most extensive responsibilities for devolved powers, and has been described as "one of the most powerful devolved parliaments in the world".

The United Kingdom has an uncodified constitution and constitutional matters are not amongst the powers that have been devolved. Under the doctrine of parliamentary sovereignty, the UK Parliament could, in theory, therefore, abolish the Scottish Parliament, Senedd or Northern Ireland Assembly. Though in the Scotland Act 2016 and the Wales Act 2017 it states that the Scottish Government and the Welsh Government "are a permanent part of the United Kingdom's constitutional arrangements".

In practice it would be politically difficult for the UK Parliament to abolish devolution to the Scottish Parliament and the Senedd because these institutions were created by referendums. The political constraints placed upon the UK Parliament's power to interfere with devolution in Northern Ireland are greater still, because devolution in Northern Ireland rests upon an international agreement with the Government of Ireland. The UK Parliament restricts the three devolved parliaments' legislative powers in economic policy matters through an act passed in 2020.

==== England ====
Unlike Scotland, Northern Ireland and Wales, England does not have a separate devolved government or national parliament, rather a process of devolution of powers from the central government to local authorities has taken place, first in 1998. The Greater London Authority was set up following a referendum in 1998. Colloquially known as City Hall, it is the devolved regional government body for Greater London. It consists of two political branches: a directly elected Mayor of London and the London Assembly, which serves as a check and balance on the Mayor.

A combined authority is a type of local government institution introduced in England outside Greater London by the Local Democracy, Economic Development and Construction Act 2009. CAs allow a group of local authorities to pool appropriate responsibility and receive certain devolved functions from central government to deliver transport and economic policy more effectively over a wider area. A combined county authority is a similar type of local-government institution introduced in England outside Greater London by the Levelling-up and Regeneration Act 2023, but may only be formed by upper-tier authorities: county councils and unitary authorities.

==== Scotland ====
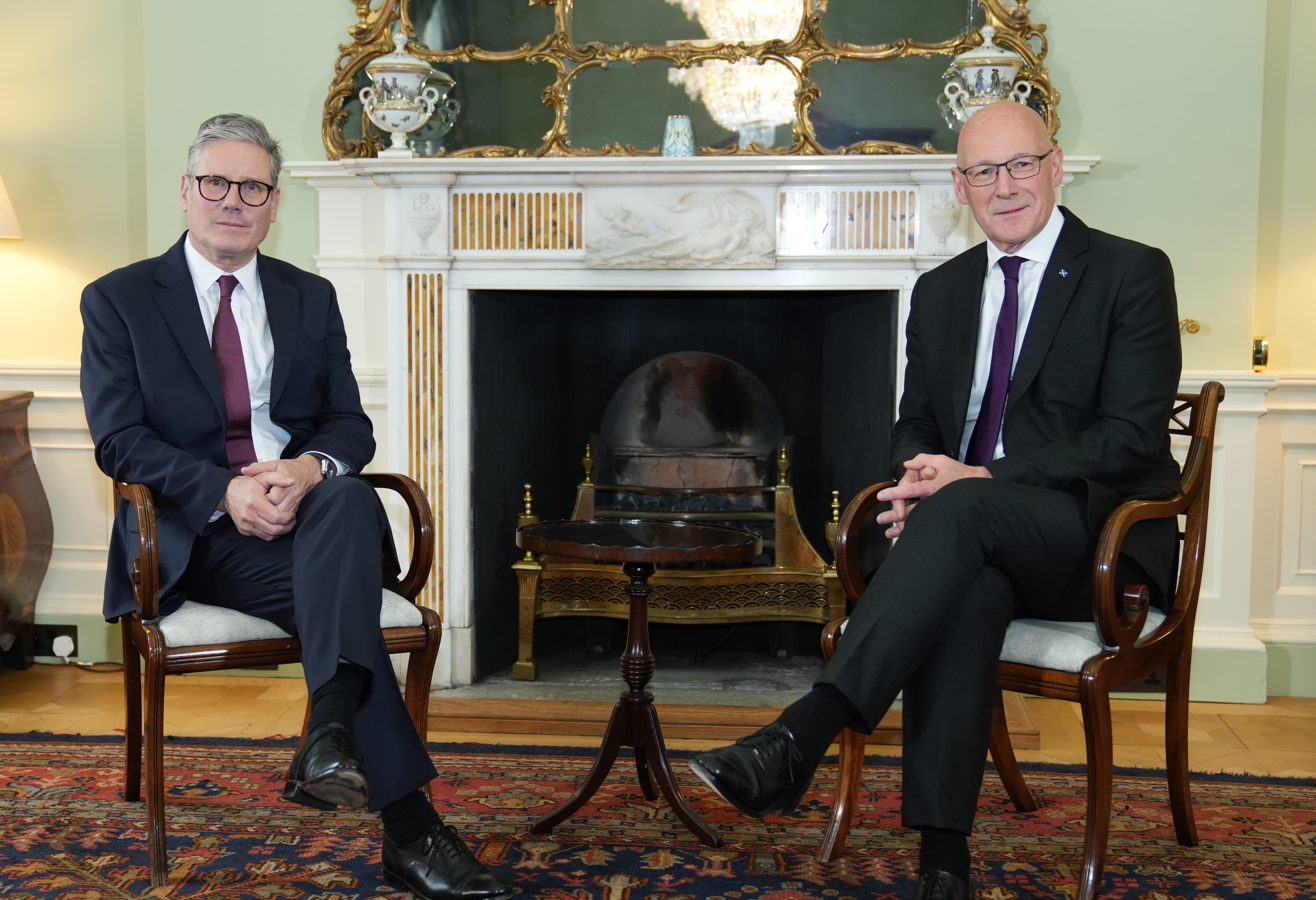
Prime Minister Keir Starmer meets with First Minister of Scotland John Swinney, the head of the Scottish Government, at Bute House, Edinburgh.

Since 1999 Scotland has had a devolved national government and parliament with wide-ranging powers over any matter that has not been specifically reserved to the UK Parliament. Scotland has the most devolved powers of any of the three devolved parliaments in the United Kingdom, with full legislative control over education, law and order, the economy, healthcare, elections, Crown Estate Scotland, the planning system and housing.

Additional powers were transferred to the Scottish Parliament via the Scotland Act 2012 and the Scotland Act 2016, such as some taxation powers, including full control of income tax on income earned through employment, Land and Buildings Transaction Tax, Landfill Tax, Aggregates Levy, Air Departure Tax and Revenue Scotland, as well as aspects of the energy network, including renewable energy, energy efficiency and onshore oil and gas licensing. Their power over economic issues is significantly constrained by an act of the UK Parliament passed in 2020.

The Scottish Government is a Scottish National Party (SNP) minority government, led by the first minister, currently John Swinney, the leader of the SNP. In 2014 the Scottish independence referendum was held, with 55.3 per cent voting against independence from the United Kingdom and 44.7 per cent voting in favour, resulting in Scotland staying within the United Kingdom. Local government in Scotland is divided into 32 council areas with a wide variation in size and population. Local councils are made up of elected councillors, of whom there are 1,223.

The Scottish Parliament is separate from the Scottish Government. It is made up of 129 elected members of the Scottish Parliament (MSPs). It is the law-making body of Scotland, and thus it scrutinises the work of the incumbent Scottish Government and considers any piece of proposed legislation through parliamentary debates, committees and parliamentary questions.

==== Wales ====
Since 1999 Wales has had a devolved national government and legislature, known as the Senedd. Elections to the Senedd used the additional member system until 2026 when the voting system was changed to closed list proportional representation. The number of elected members also increased from 60 to 96, representing 16 six-member constituencies. The Senedd has more limited powers than those devolved to Scotland. It can legislate on any matter not specifically reserved to the UK Parliament by Acts of Senedd Cymru. The Welsh Government is currently a Plaid Cymru minority government led by the first minister, Rhun ap Iorwerth. Local government in Wales consists of 22 unitary authorities, each led by a leader and cabinet elected by the council itself.

==== Northern Ireland ====
The devolved form of government in Northern Ireland is based on the 1998 Good Friday Agreement, which brought to an end a 30-year period of unionist-nationalist communal conflict known as the Troubles. The Agreement was confirmed by referendum and implemented later that year. It established power sharing arrangements for a devolved government and legislature, referred to as the Northern Ireland Executive and the Northern Ireland Assembly respectively. Elections to the Assembly use the single transferable vote system. The Executive and Assembly have powers similar to those devolved to Scotland. The Executive is led by a diarchy representing unionist and nationalist members of the Assembly. The First Minister and Deputy First Minister of Northern Ireland are the joint heads of government of Northern Ireland. Local government in Northern Ireland since 2015 has been divided between 11 councils with limited responsibilities.

=== Foreign relations ===
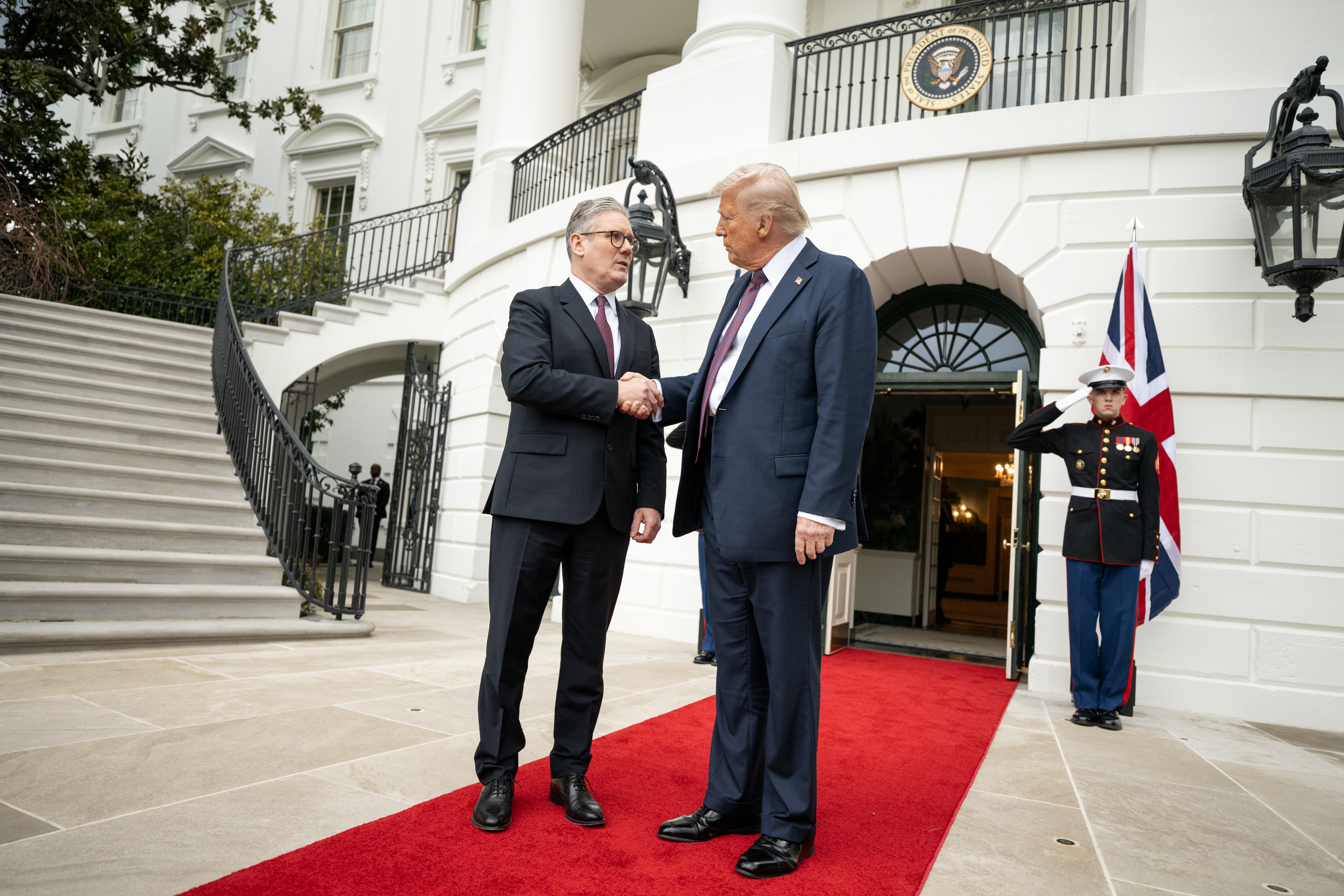
UK prime minister Keir Starmer and US president Donald Trump shaking hands in a joint press conference in 2025. The UK and the US share a "Special Relationship".

The United Kingdom is a permanent member of the United Nations Security Council and a member of NATO, AUKUS, the Commonwealth of Nations, the G7, the G20, the OECD, the WTO, the Council of Europe and the OSCE. It maintains the British Council, an organisation specialising in international cultural and educational opportunities in over 100 countries. The UK remains a great power with considerable political, cultural, economic and military influence.

The United Kingdom is said to have a "Special Relationship" with the United States and a close partnership with France – the "Entente cordiale" – and shares nuclear weapons technology with both countries; the Anglo-Portuguese Alliance is considered to be the oldest binding military alliance in the world. The UK is also closely linked with the Republic of Ireland; the two countries share a Common Travel Area and co-operate through the British-Irish Intergovernmental Conference and the British-Irish Council. Britain's global presence and influence is further amplified through its trading relations, foreign investments, official development assistance and military engagements.

=== Military ===
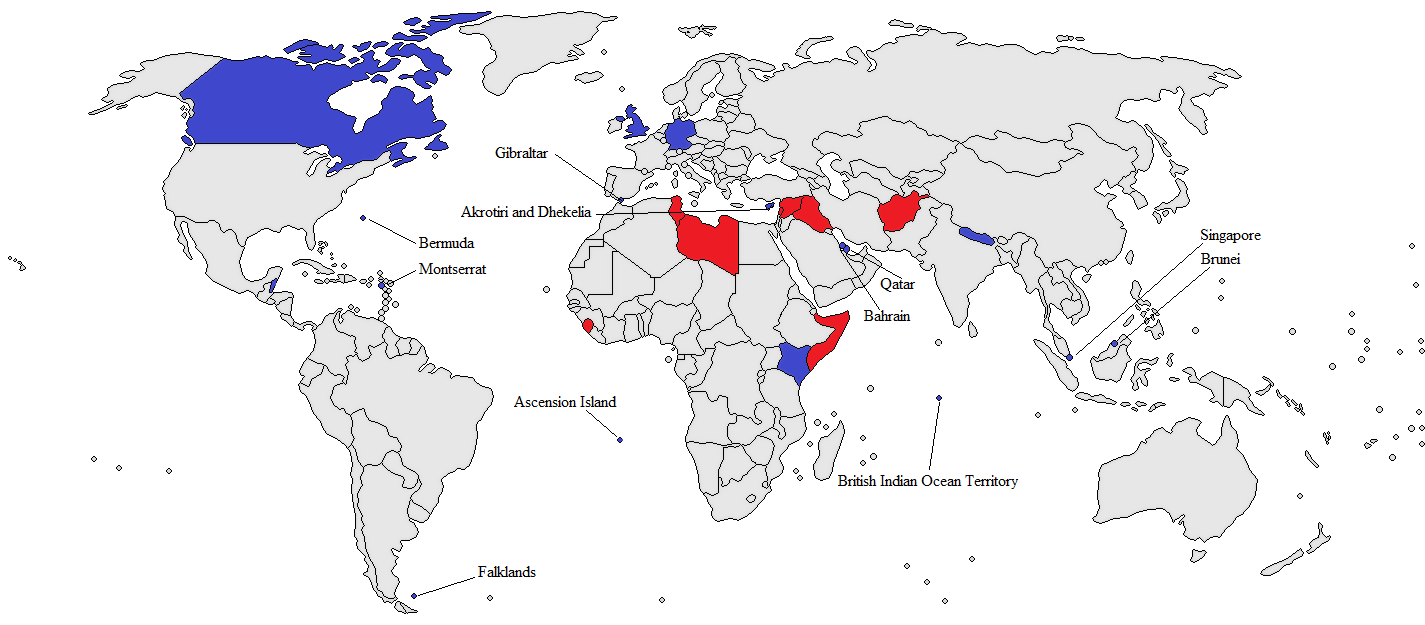
Overseas military installations of the United Kingdom, and locally raised units of the British Overseas Territories Military interventions since 2000: Palliser (Sierra Leone); Herrick (Afghanistan); Enduring Freedom (Horn of Africa); Telic (Iraq); Ellamy (Libya); and Shader (Islamic State of Iraq and the Levant).

The British Armed Forces consist of three professional service branches: the Royal Navy and Royal Marines (forming the Naval Service), the British Army and the Royal Air Force. The armed forces of the United Kingdom are managed by the Ministry of Defence and controlled by the Defence Council, chaired by the Secretary of State for Defence. The Commander-in-Chief is the British monarch, to whom members of the forces swear an oath of allegiance.

The armed forces are charged with protecting the United Kingdom and its overseas territories, promoting the UK's global security interests and supporting international peacekeeping efforts. They are active and regular participants in NATO (including the Allied Rapid Reaction Corps), the Five Power Defence Arrangements, RIMPAC and other worldwide coalition operations. Overseas garrisons and facilities are maintained in Ascension Island, Bahrain, Belize, Brunei, Canada, Cyprus, Diego Garcia, the Falkland Islands, Germany, Gibraltar, Kenya, Oman, Qatar and Singapore.

According to the Stockholm International Peace Research Institute and the International Institute for Strategic Studies, the UK had the world's sixth- or fifth-highest military expenditures in 2025. Total defence spending in 2024 was estimated at 2.3 per cent of gross domestic product. Following the end of the Cold War, defence policy has a stated assumption that "the most demanding operations" will be undertaken as part of a coalition.

=== Law and criminal justice ===
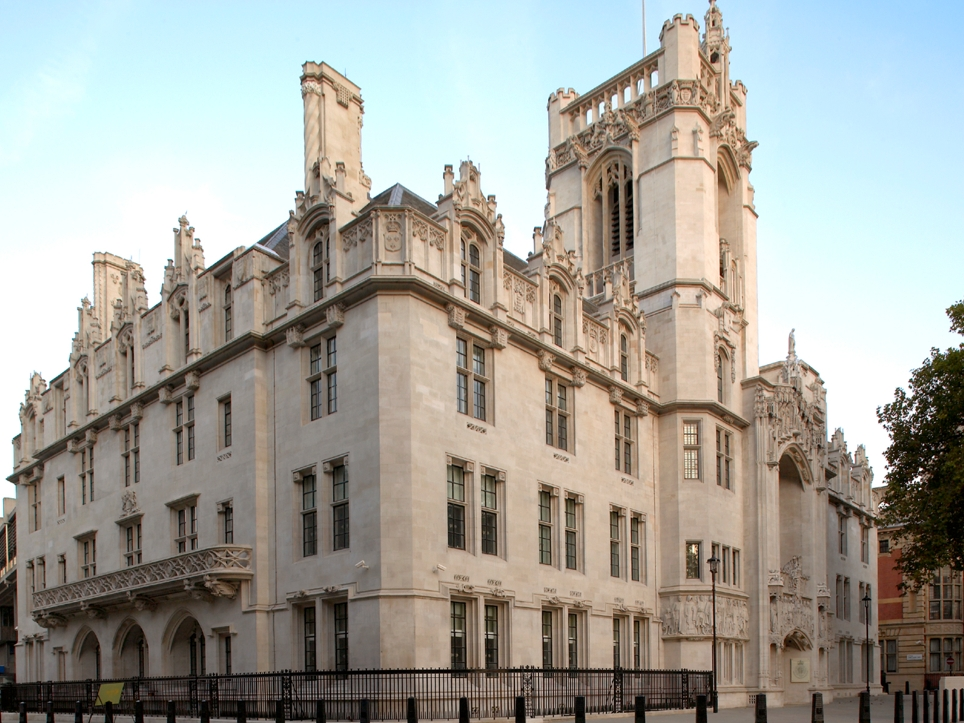
The Supreme Court is the final court of appeal for England, Wales and Northern Ireland, and for Scottish civil cases.

The United Kingdom does not have a single legal system as the 1706 Treaty of Union provided for the continuation of Scotland's separate legal system. The UK has three distinct systems of law: English law, Northern Ireland law and Scots law. A new Supreme Court of the United Kingdom came into being in October 2009 to replace the Appellate Committee of the House of Lords. The Judicial Committee of the Privy Council, including the same members as the Supreme Court, is the highest court of appeal for several independent Commonwealth countries, the British Overseas Territories and the Crown Dependencies.

Both English law, which applies in England and Wales, and Northern Ireland law are based on common law (or case law) principles. It originated in England in the Middle Ages and is the basis for many legal systems around the world. The courts of England and Wales are headed by the Senior Courts of England and Wales, consisting of the Court of Appeal, the High Court of Justice for civil cases and the Crown Court for criminal cases. Scots law is a hybrid system based on common-law and civil-law principles. The chief courts are the Court of Session, for civil cases, and the High Court of Justiciary, for criminal cases. The Supreme Court of the United Kingdom serves as the highest court of appeal for civil cases under Scots law. The criminal justice system has been characterised by low conviction rates and court delays for some crime types.

Crime in England and Wales increased between 1981 and 1995. Since that peak there has been an overall fall of 66% in recorded crime from 1995 to 2015, according to UK crime statistics.

UK labour laws establish employment rights including a minimum wage, a minimum of 28 days annual holiday, parental leave, statutory sick pay and a pension. Same-sex marriage has been legal in England, Scotland, and Wales since 2014, and in Northern Ireland since 2020. LGBT equality in the United Kingdom is considered advanced by modern standards.

Since leaving the EU most disputes under UK-EU agreements are addressed through consultation between the parties. If consultation fails to resolve the issue, either party can request arbitration, typically at the PCA in The Hague. The EU–UK Trade and Cooperation Agreement states that the UK and EU have to cooperate and negotiate with each other with 'full mutual respect and good faith', as defined by international law. Under the Windsor Framework, Northern Ireland matters requiring interpretation of EU law go to the ECJ, though the Stormont Brake can prevent new EU rules from taking effect.

== Economy ==
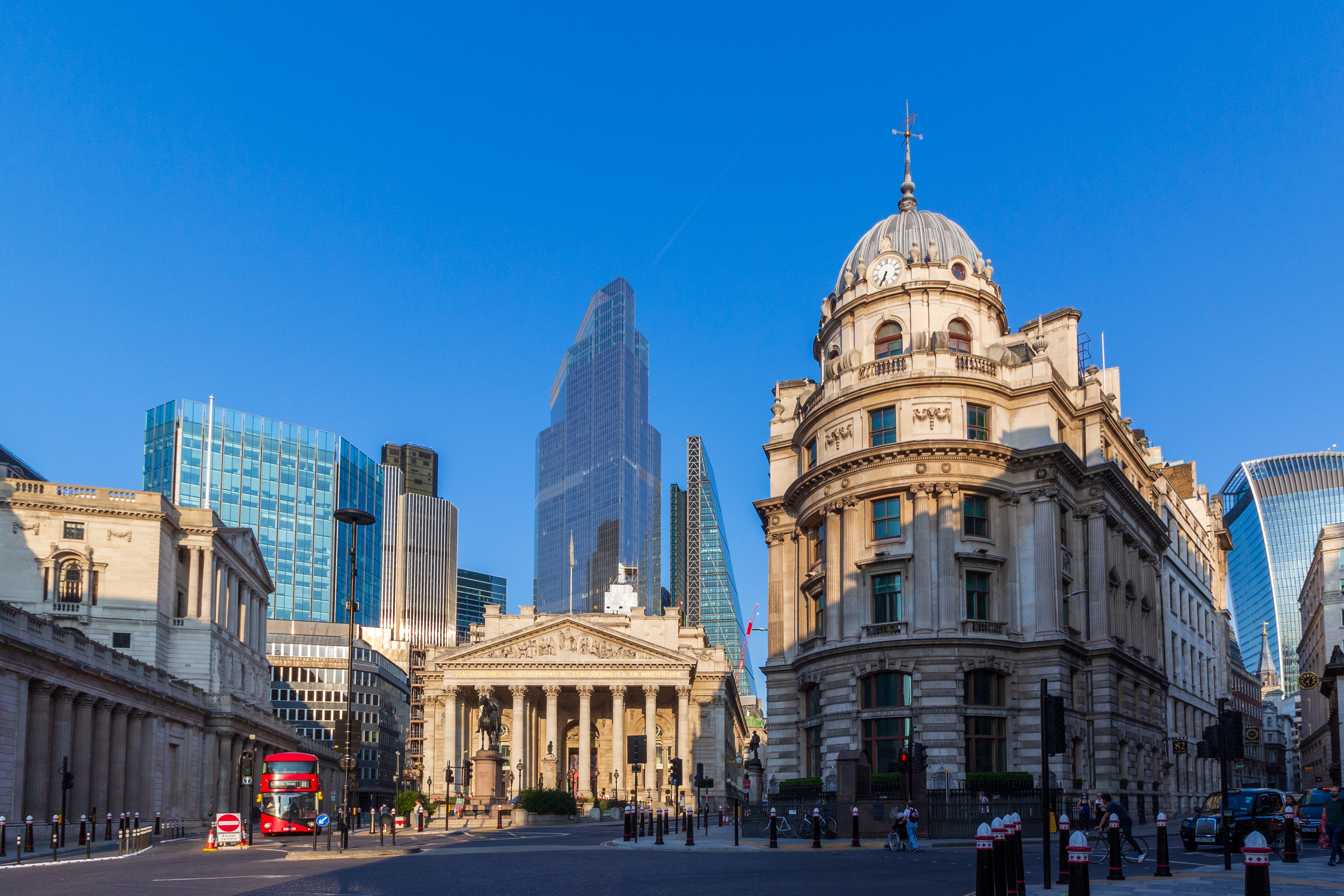
City of London skyline from at Bank Junction. London is Europe's largest financial centre.

The United Kingdom has a highly developed social market economy. With an estimated nominal gross domestic product (GDP) of £2.819 trillion in 2025, it is the fifth-largest national economy in the world and the second-largest in Europe. Its currency, the pound sterling, is the fourth-most-traded currency in the foreign exchange market and the world's fourth-largest reserve currency, after the United States dollar, the euro and the yen. The pound sterling maintains its high nominal value through both its long history of stability and by never undergoing formal redenomination. Since 2022 the UK has been both the world's fourth-largest exporter and fourth-largest importer of goods and services. Despite having one of the highest levels of income inequality in the OECD, the UK has a very high HDI ranking, including when adjusted for inequality. As of 2025 the UK unemployment rate is 4.7% and the annual real GDP per head growth was 1.1%.

HM Treasury, led by the Chancellor of the Exchequer, is responsible for developing and executing the government's public finance and economic policy. The Department for Business and Trade is responsible for business, international trade, and enterprise. The Bank of England is the UK's central bank and responsible for issuing notes and coins in the pound sterling. Banks in Scotland and Northern Ireland retain the right to issue their own notes, subject to retaining enough Bank of England notes in reserve to cover their issue.

=== Industries and services ===
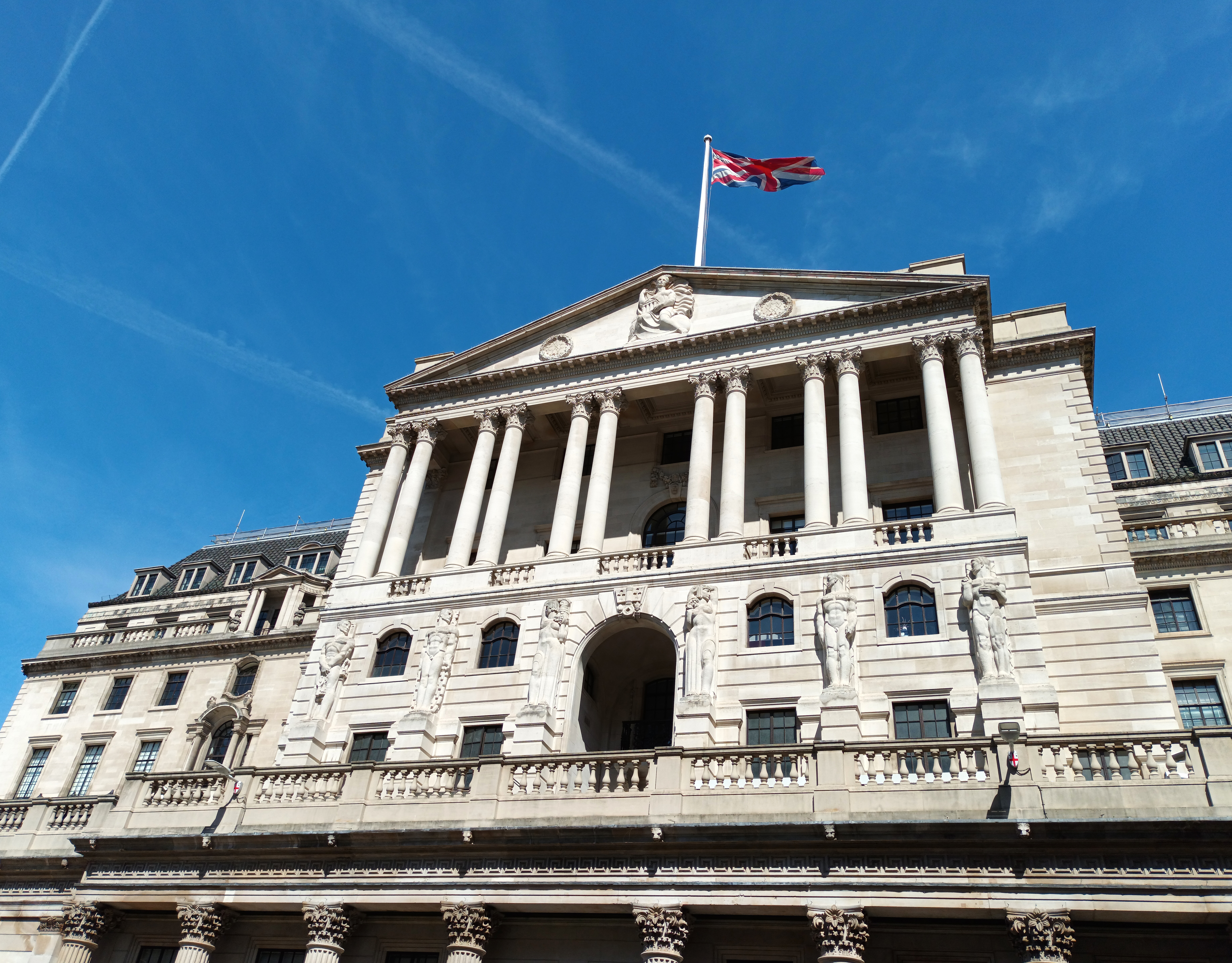
The Bank of England is the central bank of the United Kingdom and the model on which most modern central banks have been based.

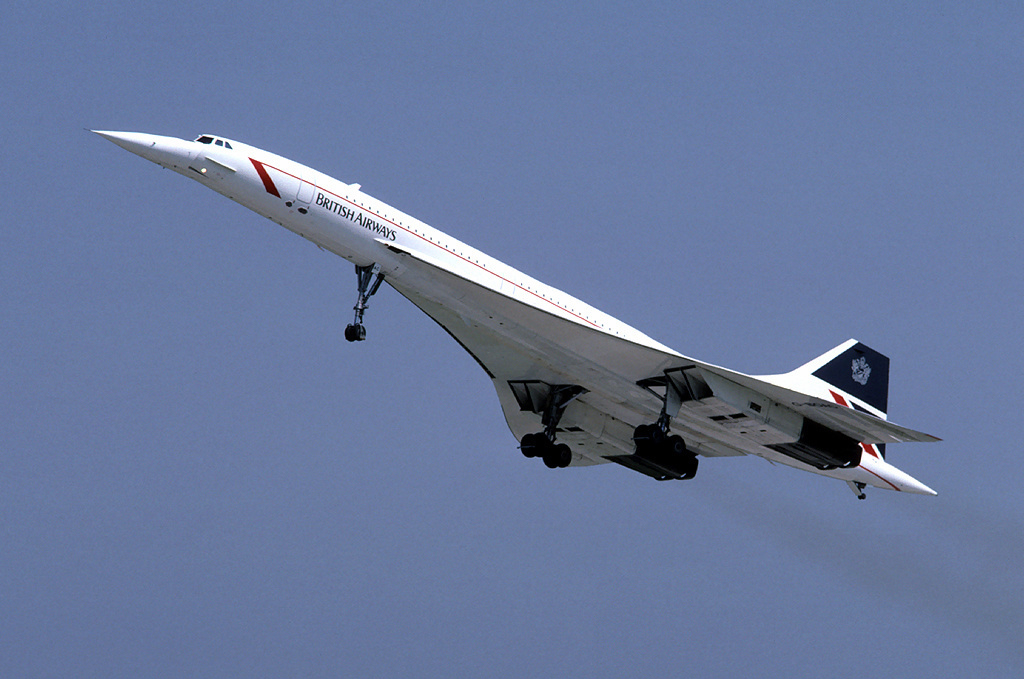
Concorde was a supersonic airliner that reduced transatlantic flight time from 8 hours to 3.5 hours.

The service sector made up around 80 per cent of the UK's GVA in 2023. As of 2023 it is the world's second-largest exporter of services and in 2024 was the world's largest net exporter of financial services. London is the world capital for foreign exchange trading, with a market share of 37.8 per cent in 2022 of the global turnover. It is the largest urban economy in Europe and, alongside New York, the city in the world most integrated with the global economy. London is also one of the world's leading financial centres, ranking second in the 2025 Global Financial Centres Index. Edinburgh, the UK's second-largest financial centre, ranks 29th in the world in the same index.

The UK's manufacturing sector in 2024 was the world's 10th-largest and Europe's fourth-largest by value output. At the end of 2024 manufacturing in the United Kingdom accounted for 8 per cent of the workforce and 8.6 per cent of national economic output. As reported in 2017 the East Midlands and West Midlands (at 12.6 and 11.8 per cent respectively) were the regions with the highest proportion of employees in manufacturing. London's manufacturing sector had the lowest at 2.8 per cent.

The country's tourism sector is important to the British economy; The creative industries accounted for 5.9 per cent of the UK's GVA in 2019, and contributed £111 billion to the UK economy in 2018. Lloyd's of London, located in London, is the world's largest insurance and reinsurance market. WPP plc is one of the world's biggest advertising companies and also based in London. The UK is one of Europe's leading retail markets and its largest e-commerce market. With consumption expenditures of over US$2 trillion in 2023, it has the second-largest consumer market in Europe. John Lewis is the UK's largest employee-owned business.

The British automotive industry generates £47 billion of exports (12 per cent of the UK's total exports of goods). In 2024 the UK produced 779,584 passenger vehicles and 125,649 commercial vehicles; 8 out of 10 cars produced in the UK are exported overseas. Britain is known for iconic cars like Mini and Jaguar, as well as luxury cars such as Rolls-Royce, Bentley and Range Rover. The UK is a major centre for engine manufacturing: 1.59 million engines were produced in 2024. It was the world's third-largest exporter of engines by value in 2023. The UK motorsport industry has an annual turnover of around £10 billion. Seven of the eleven Formula One teams are based in the UK, with their technology being used in supercars and hypercars from McLaren, Aston Martin and Lotus. (Note: Car brands here are classed as British based on several of the following criteria: historical heritage, cultural significance, design and engineering base, manufacturing location, headquarters location, UK registered company (even with overseas investors).) The aerospace industry of the UK is the second-largest in the world and has an annual turnover of around £30 billion. The UK space industry was worth £17.5 billion in 2020/21 and employed around 48,800 people. The UK Space Agency has stated in 2023 that it is investing £1.6 billion in space-related projects.

The British agriculture industry is intensive, highly mechanised and efficient by European standards, producing approximately 60 per cent of the country's overall food requirements and 73 per cent of its indigenous food needs, using around 0.9 per cent of the labour force (292,000 workers). Around two-thirds of production is devoted to livestock and one-third to arable crops. The UK retains a significant though much reduced fishing industry, with at least 49 per cent of UK fish sustainably caught in 2020. The UK marine natural capital assets were estimated to have a value of £211 billion in 2021. It is rich in a variety of other natural resources including coal, petroleum, natural gas, tin, limestone, iron ore, salt, clay, chalk, gypsum, lead, and silica and has an abundance of arable land.

=== Science and technology ===
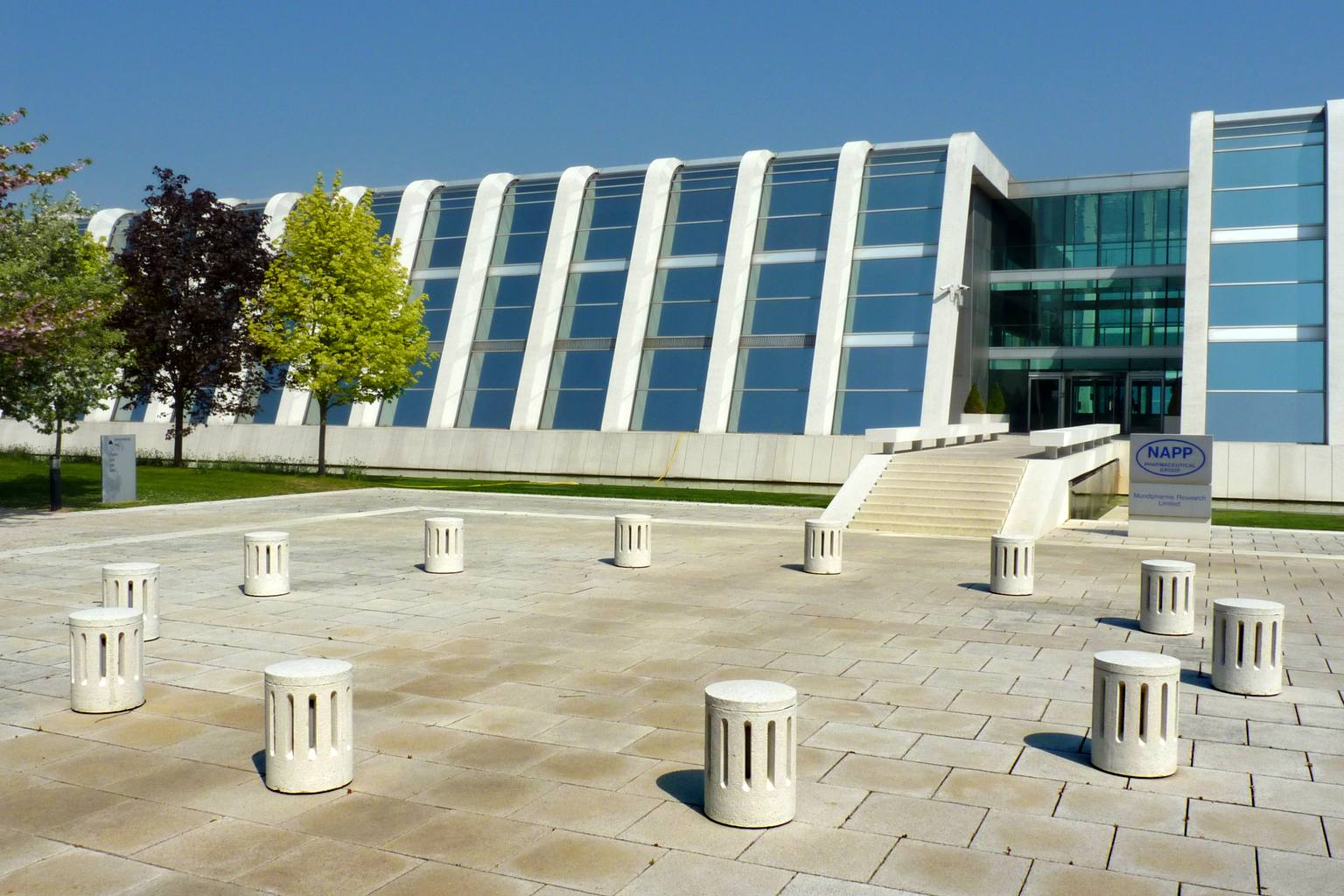
The Cambridge Cluster is the most intensive research cluster for science and technology in the world.

England and Scotland were leading centres of the Scientific Revolution from the 17th century. The United Kingdom led the Industrial Revolution from the 18th century, and has continued to produce scientists and engineers credited with important advances. Major theorists from the 17th and 18th centuries include Isaac Newton, whose laws of motion and illumination of gravity have been seen as a keystone of modern science; from the 19th century Charles Darwin, whose theory of evolution by natural selection was fundamental to the development of modern biology, and James Clerk Maxwell, who formulated classical electromagnetic theory; and more recently Stephen Hawking, who advanced major theories in the fields of cosmology, quantum gravity and the investigation of black holes.

The Department for Science, Innovation and Technology (DSIT) is responsible for helping to develop and manage the UK's scientific, research, and technological outputs. Scientific research and development remains important in British universities, with many establishing science parks to facilitate production and co-operation with industry. In 2022, the UK produced 6.0 per cent of the world's scientific research papers and had an 8.8 per cent share of scientific citations, the fourth and third highest among G7 countries and Brazil, China, India, Russia, and South Korea. The UK ranked 1st among these countries for Field-Weighted Citation Impact. Scientific journals produced in the UK include publications by the Royal Society, Nature, the British Medical Journal and The Lancet.

By 2024 the UK tech sector reached a value of US$1.2 trillion surpassing the combined values of the French and German sectors. Cambridge was named the number one university in the world for producing successful technology founders. The UK's artificial intelligence industry is the largest in Europe by value and the country ranked fifth globally in a 2026 report on artificial intelligence development by Stanford University. The UK ranked 6th in the Global Innovation Index of 2026 and 2025.

=== Transport ===
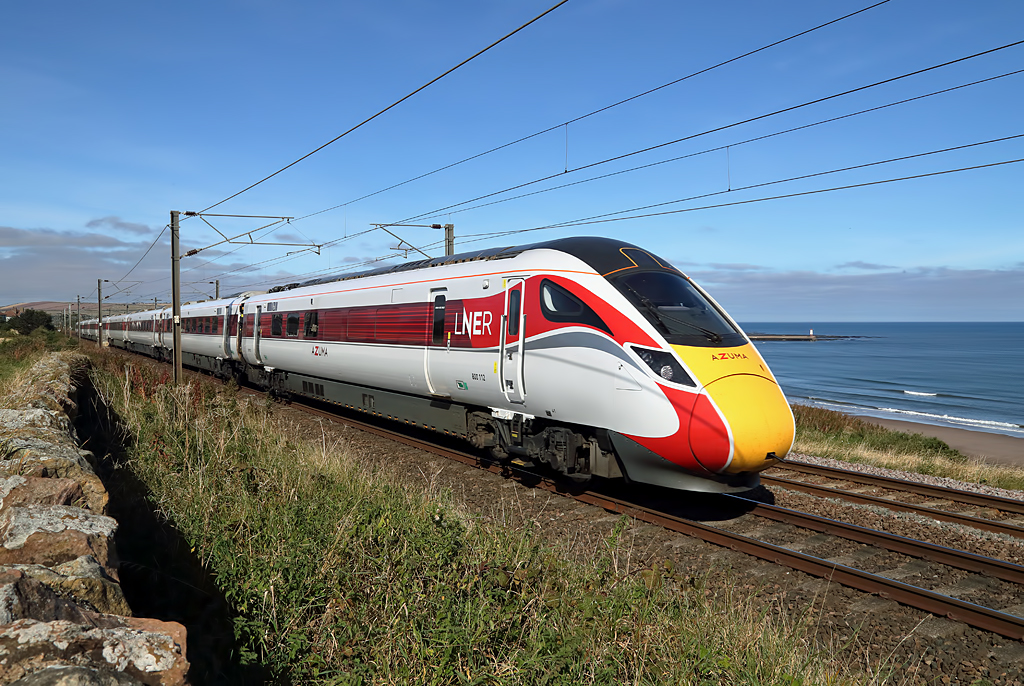
A high-speed East Coast Main Line train in Northumberland, England

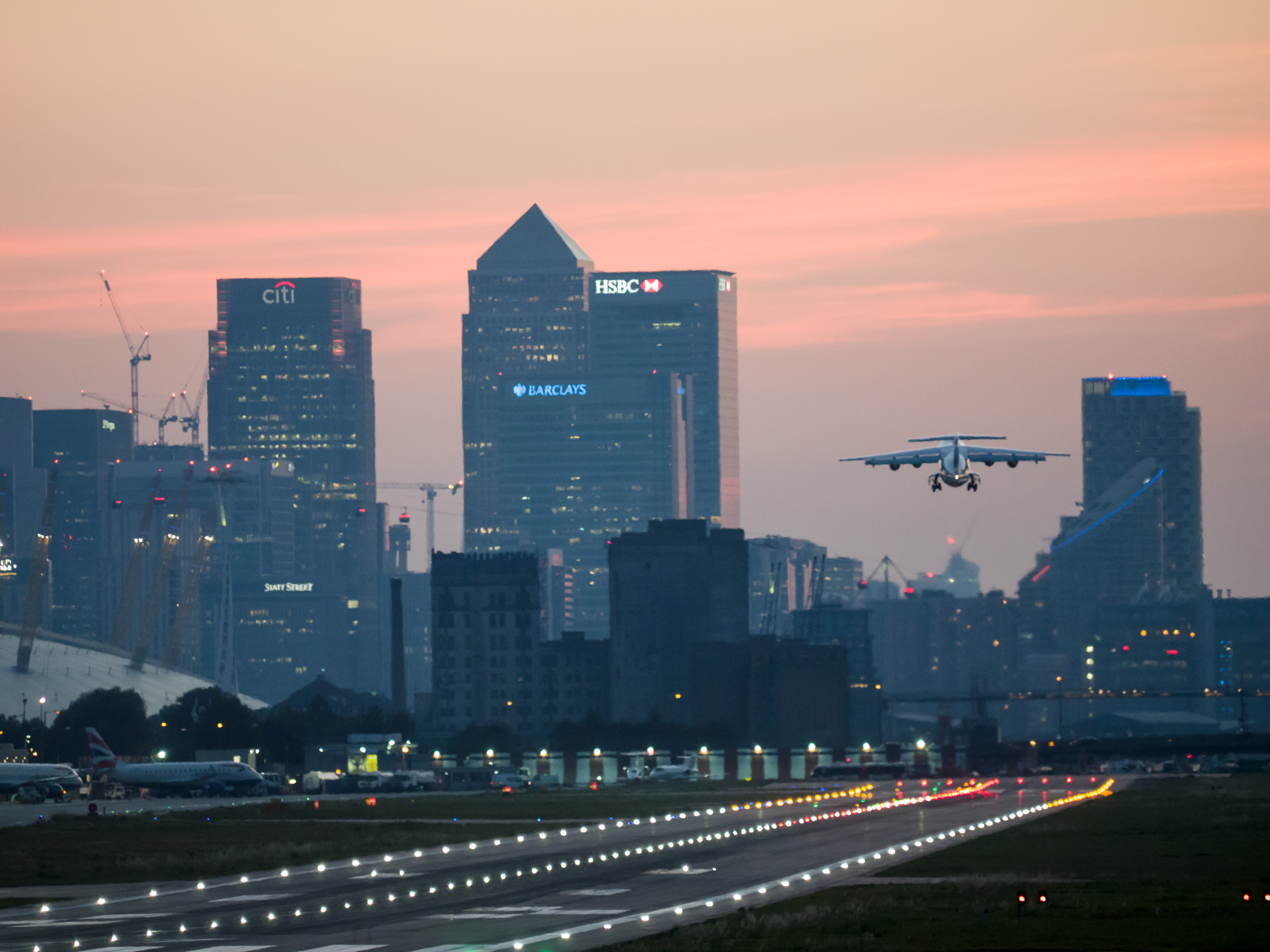
A plane taking off from London City Airport. London's airports make it the city with the busiest airport system in the world.

In the UK, all traffic drives on the left, with distance and speed being measured in miles, yards and miles per hour (mph). All vehicles manufactured for use in the UK have the steering wheel situated on the right side of the vehicle. A radial road network totals 29,145 miles (46,904 km) of main roads, 2,173 miles (3,497 km) of motorways and 213,750 miles (344,000 km) of paved roads. The M25, encircling London, is the largest and busiest bypass in the world. In 2024 there were 41.7 million licensed vehicles in the UK.

The UK has an extensive railway network of 10,072 miles (16,209 km). In Great Britain, the British Rail network was privatised between 1994 and 1997, followed by a rapid rise in passengers. Great British Railways is a planned state-owned public body that will oversee rail transport in Great Britain. The UK was ranked eighth amongst national European rail systems in the 2017 European Railway Performance Index assessing intensity of use, quality of service and safety.

A train runs directly from London to Paris. Called the Eurostar, it travels through the Channel Tunnel under the English Channel. At 23.5 miles long, it is the world's longest undersea tunnel. There is also a car service through the tunnel to France called LeShuttle. The Elizabeth line, a rail link running between East and West London, was named in honour of Queen Elizabeth II in 2016 and opened in 2022. Another major infrastructure project is High Speed 2 (HS2), a high-speed railway under construction since 2019. It will link London with Birmingham, with the potential to extend further north and capable of speeds of up to 225 mph.

In 2023 there were 4 billion bus journeys in the UK, 1.8 billion of which were in London. The red double-decker bus has entered popular culture as an internationally recognised icon of London and England. The London bus network is extensive, with over 6,800 scheduled services every weekday carrying about 6 million passengers on over 700 different routes, making it one of the most extensive bus systems in the world and the largest in Europe.

In 2024, British airports handled nearly 292.5 million passengers. In that period the three largest airports were London Heathrow Airport (83.9 million passengers), Gatwick Airport (43.2 million passengers) and Manchester Airport (30.8 million passengers). London Heathrow Airport, located 15 miles (24 km) west of the capital, is the world's second-busiest airport by international passenger traffic and has the most international passenger traffic of any airport in the world; it is the hub for the UK flag carrier British Airways, as well as Virgin Atlantic. During 2023, 18.3 million passengers travelled internationally by rail and 18.1 million by sea.

=== Energy ===
In 2021 the UK was the world's 14th-largest consumer and 22nd-largest producer of energy. It is home to many large energy companies, including two of the six major oil and gas companies – BP and Shell.

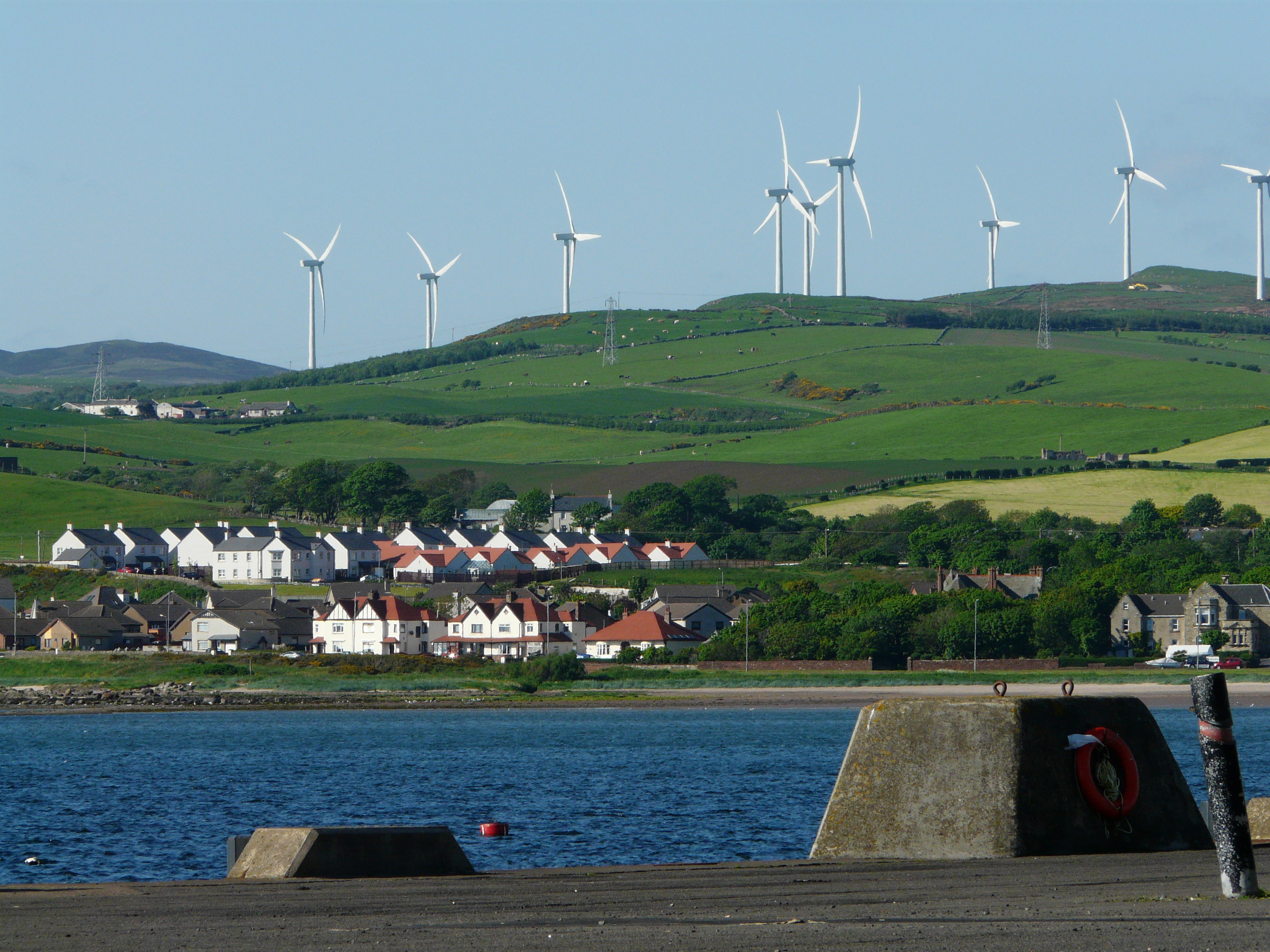
Wind turbines overlooking Ardrossan in Scotland. The UK is a major producer of wind energy in Europe.

Renewable electricity sources provided 51 per cent of the electricity generated in the UK in 2024. Wind power was the largest source of electricity in 2024, generating 30 per cent of the UK's total electricity. The UK has the largest offshore wind farm in the world, which is located off the coast of Yorkshire.

In 2023 the UK had nine nuclear reactors generating about 15 per cent of the UK's electricity. There are two reactors under construction and more planned. In the late 1990s nuclear power plants contributed around 25 per cent of the total annual electricity generation in the UK, but this has gradually declined as old plants have been shut down. The UK government is investing in small modular reactors that operate via nuclear fission, as well as in research and development towards commercial fusion reactors. To that end the government entered into a partnership with the US in late 2023 to collaborate on fusion technology, with "a commercial grid-ready fusion reactor by 2040" stated as a goal.

At the end of 2023 it was estimated that there were 1.1 billion barrels of oil equivalent of "proven" and "probable" gas reserves and 2.3 billion boe of "proven" and "probable" oil reserves offshore, reducing reliance on imports for energy security and transitioning to renewables. Emissions from UK gas production are roughly four times lower than imported liquefied natural gas (LNG), according to the UK's oil and gas regulator.

In September 2024 the last coal power station was closed, making coal no longer a power source in the UK. The UK currently has no fracking (hydraulic fracturing) for shale gas despite a large supply, due to environmental concerns.

=== Water supply and sanitation ===
Access to improved water supply and sanitation in the UK is universal. It was estimated that 96 per cent of households were connected to the sewer network in 2022. According to the Environment Agency, total water abstraction for public water supply in the UK was 16,406 megalitres per day in 2007.

In England and Wales, water and sewerage services are provided by 10 private regional water and sewerage companies and 13 mostly smaller private "water only" companies. In Scotland, said services are provided by a single public company, Scottish Water. In Northern Ireland, they are also provided by a single public entity, Northern Ireland Water.

== Demographics ==
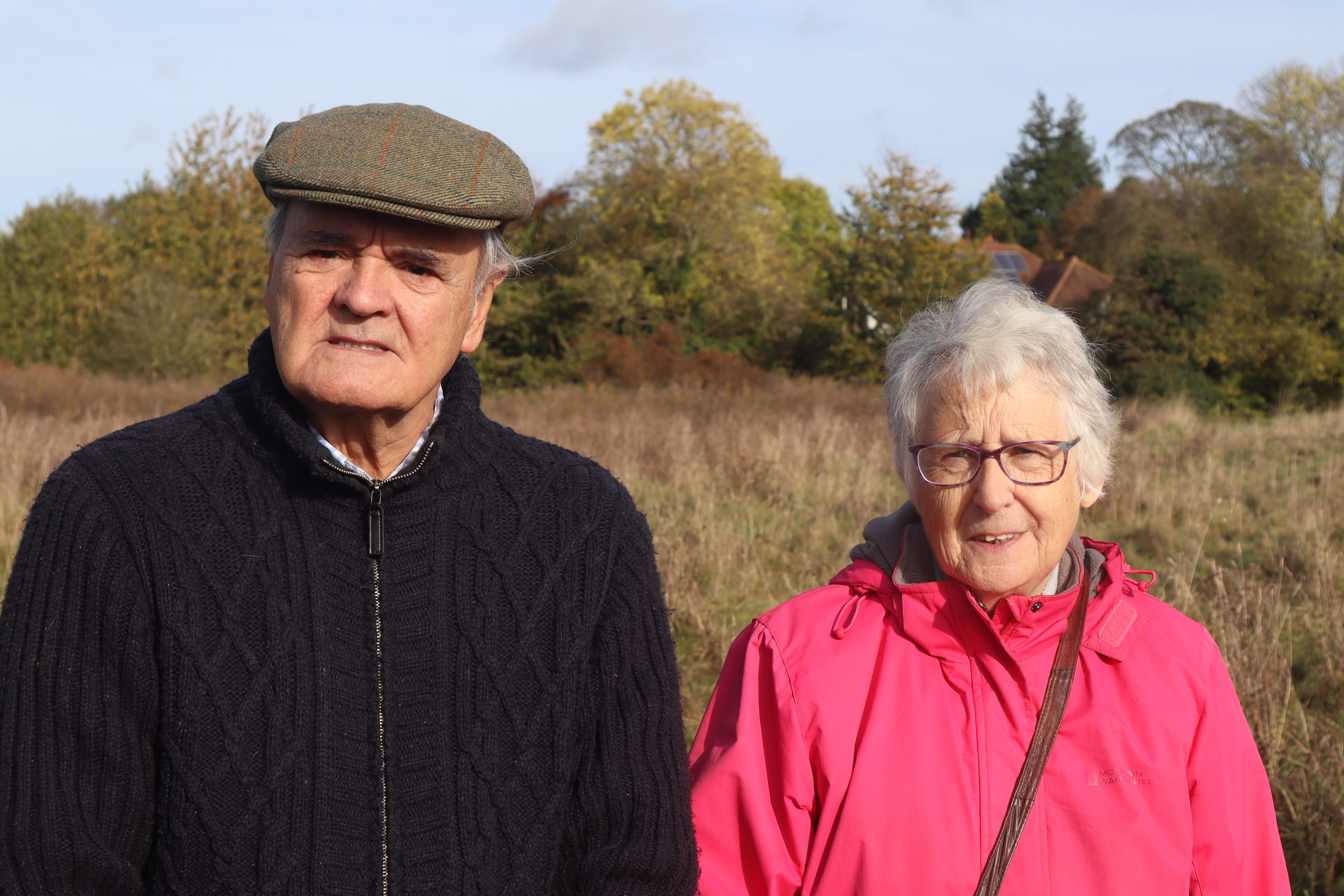
An elderly British couple. Approximately 24% of people in England and Wales are aged 60 years and over.

Whereas the censuses of England and Wales and of Northern Ireland went ahead as planned in 2021, the census in Scotland was delayed until 2022 due to the COVID-19 pandemic. The Office for National Statistics has estimated that the total population of the United Kingdom recorded in the census would have been 66,912,637 had it been conducted in all parts of the UK on 21 March 2021. The UK population is the fourth-largest in Europe and the 22nd-largest in the world. In 2012 and 2013 births contributed the most to population growth, while in 2014 and 2015 net international migration contributed more. Between 2001 and 2011 the population increased at an average annual rate of 0.7 per cent. The total population is estimated to have been 69.5 million in mid-2025, with the 12 months prior to that experiencing the slowest population growth since 1998, with the exception of 2020, the first year of the COVID-19 pandemic.

The 2011 census showed that, over the previous 100 years, the proportion of the population aged 0–14 fell from 31 to 18 per cent, and the proportion of people aged 65 and over rose from 5 to 16 per cent. In 2018 the median age of the UK population was 41.7 years. The 2021 census put Scotland's population at 5.48 million, Wales's at 3.1 million and Northern Ireland's at 1.9 million.

Population of the United Kingdom by country (2025)
Country	Land area		Population		Density (/km^{2})
Country	(km^{2})	(%)	People	(%)	Density (/km^{2})
England	130,310	54%	58,834,812	85%	451
Scotland	77,900	32%	5,545,500	8%	71
Wales	20,737	9%	3,175,181	5%	153
Northern Ireland	13,547	6%	1,928,446	3%	142
United Kingdom	242,494	100%	69,483,939	100%	287

England's population in 2021 was 56 million, representing some 84 per cent of the UK total. England is one of the most-densely-populated countries in the world, with 434 people per square kilometre in mid-2021, with a particular concentration in London, the capital, and the south-east. London's wider metropolitan area is the largest in Western Europe, with a population of 14.9 million in 2024.

Population of England by region (2025)
Region	Land area		Population		Density (/km^{2})
Region	(km^{2})	(%)	People	(%)	Density (/km^{2})
North East	8,581	6%	2,683,040	5%	313
North West	14,108	11%	7,516,113	13%	533
Yorkshire and the Humber	15,404	12%	5,541,262	10%	360
East Midlands	15,624	12%	4,934,939	9%	316
West Midlands	12,998	10%	6,021,653	11%	463
East of England	19,116	15%	6,398,497	11%	335
Greater London	1,572	1%	8,866,180	15%	5,640
South East	19,072	15%	9,379,833	16%	492
South West	23,836	18%	5,764,881	10%	242
England	130,310	100%	57,106,398	100%	438

In 2021 the total fertility rate across the UK was 1.53 children born per woman, which remains considerably below the baby boom peak of 2.95 children per woman in 1964, or the high of 6.02 children born per woman in 1815 and below the replacement rate of 2.1. In 2011, 47.3 per cent of births in the UK were to unmarried women. The Office for National Statistics reported in 2015 that amongst the UK population aged 16 and over, 1.7 per cent identify as gay, lesbian, or bisexual (2.0 per cent of males and 1.5 per cent of females); 4.5 per cent of respondents responded with "other", "I don't know", or did not respond. The number of transgender people in the UK was estimated to be between 65,000 and 300,000 by research between 2001 and 2008.

Largest cities or towns in the United Kingdom (England and Wales: 2011 census built-up area; Scotland: 2016 estimates settlement; Northern Ireland: 2001 census urban area)
Rank	Name	Urban area	Pop.	Rank	Name	Urban area	Pop.
1	London	Greater London	9,787,426	11	Bristol	Bristol	617,280
2	Manchester	Greater Manchester	2,553,379	12	Edinburgh	Edinburgh	512,150
3	Birmingham	West Midlands	2,440,986	13	Leicester	Leicester	508,916
4	Leeds	West Yorkshire	1,777,934	14	Belfast	Belfast	483,418
5	Glasgow	Greater Glasgow	985,290	15	Brighton	Brighton & Hove	474,485
6	Liverpool	Liverpool	864,122	16	Bournemouth	South East Dorset	466,266
7	Southampton	South Hampshire	855,569	17	Cardiff	Cardiff	390,214
8	Newcastle upon Tyne	Tyneside	774,891	18	Middlesbrough	Teesside	376,633
9	Nottingham	Nottingham	729,977	19	Stoke-on-Trent	Stoke-on-Trent	372,775
10	Sheffield	Sheffield	685,368	20	Coventry	Coventry	359,262

=== Ethnicity ===
Historically, indigenous British people were thought to be descended from ethnic groups that settled there before the 12th century: the Celts, Romans, Anglo-Saxons, Norse and the Normans. Welsh people could be the oldest ethnic group in the UK. The UK has a history of non-white immigration with Liverpool having the oldest black population in the country dating from at least the 1730s, in addition to having the oldest Chinese community in Europe dating from the 19th century.

In 2021, 83.1 per cent of the UK population was classified as white, 8.6 per cent as Asian or Asian British, 3.7 per cent as Black or Black British, 2.7 per cent as mixed ethnicity, and 2.0 per cent other. Ethnic diversity varies significantly across the UK. In 2021, 46.2 per cent of London's population was from a non-white ethnic minority, compared less than 10 per cent in the South West and North East of England, Wales, Scotland and Northern Ireland.

=== Migration ===
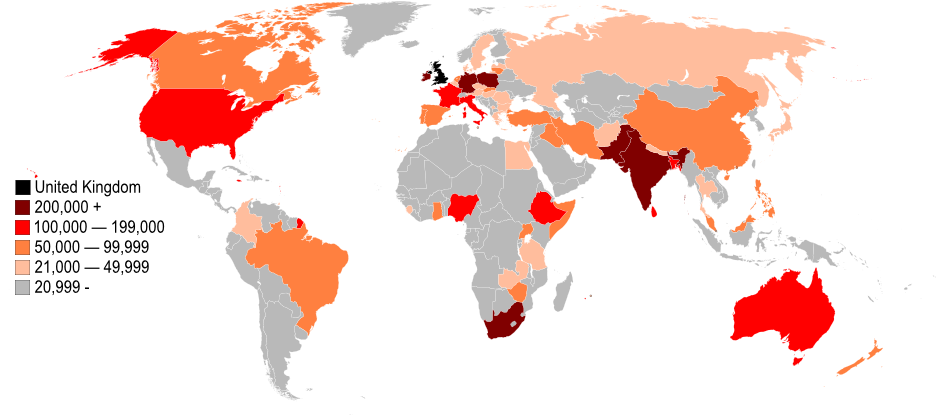
Estimated foreign-born population by country of birth from April 2007 to March 2008

Estimated number of British citizens living overseas by country in 2006: Greater than or equal to 1,000,000 500,000 - 999,999 100,000 - 499,999 50,000 - 99,999 10,000 - 49,999 5,000 - 9,999 1,000 - 4,999 100 - 999 Less than 100 or no data UK

Immigration is contributing to a rising population in the United Kingdom, with arrivals and UK-born children of migrants accounting for about half of the population increase between 1991 and 2001. According to statistics released in 2015, 27 per cent of UK live births in 2014 were to mothers born outside the UK.

In 2013 approximately 208,000 foreign nationals were naturalised as British citizens, the highest number since 1962. This figure fell to around 125,800 in 2014. Between 2009 and 2013 the average number of British citizenships granted annually was 195,800. The most common origins of those naturalised in 2024 were Pakistani, Indian, Nigerian, Filipino, Bangladeshi, Italian, Turkish, Romanian and Iranian. The number of grants of settlement, which confer permanent residence in the UK but not citizenship, was approximately 154,700 in 2013, higher than the previous two years. Long-term net migration (the number of people immigrating minus the number emigrating) reached a record of 860,000 in 2023, with immigration at 1.326 million and emigration at 466,000. In comparison, in 2024 net migration was estimated to be 431,000 with immigration at 948,000 and emigration at 517,000. Net migration fell to 222,900 in the 12 months to mid-2025, contributing to the lowest population growth rate (excluding the first year of the COVID-19 pandemic) since 1998.

Emigration was an important feature of British society in the 19th century. Between 1815 and 1930, around 11.4 million people emigrated from Britain and 7.3 million from Ireland. Estimates show that by the end of the 20th century, some 300 million people of British and Irish descent were permanently settled around the globe. In 2006 at least 5.5 million UK-born people lived abroad, mainly in Australia, Spain, the United States and Canada.

=== Language ===
The English language is the de facto official and most widely spoken language in the United Kingdom. The UK promotes the language globally to build connections, understanding and trust between people in the UK and countries worldwide.

In the UK, the English language is spoken with distinctive characteristics that collectively form what is known as British English. The variety of dialects and accents is often noted, with nearby regions frequently having highly distinct variations. Received Pronunciation is traditionally associated with educated speakers in southern England. The main national dialects are Scottish English, Welsh English and Northern Irish English. Distinctive regional varieties include Brummie, Cockney, Geordie, Mancunian, Scouse, West Country, Yorkshire and MLE (Multicultural London English).

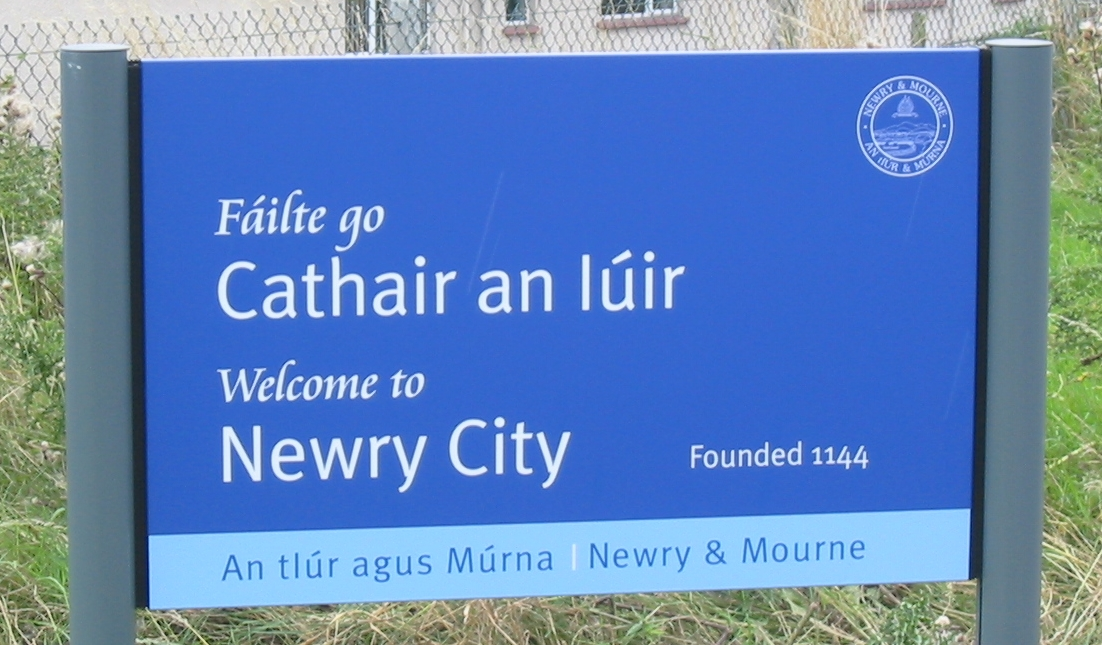
Bilingual sign (Irish and English) in Newry, Northern Ireland

Three indigenous Celtic languages are spoken in the UK: Welsh, Irish and Scottish Gaelic. Cornish, which became extinct as a first language in the late-18th century, is being revived and has a small group of second-language speakers. In the 2021 census the Welsh-speaking population of Wales aged three or older was 538,300 (17.8 per cent). In addition it is estimated that about 200,000 Welsh-speakers live in England. In the 2021 census in Northern Ireland 12.4 per cent of people had some Irish language ability and 10.4 per cent had some facility in the Ulster-Scots language.

In 2001, over 92,000 people in Scotland, just under 2 per cent of the population, had some Gaelic language ability, including 72 per cent of those living in the Outer Hebrides. The number of children being taught either Welsh or Scottish Gaelic is increasing. Scots, a language descended from early northern Middle English, has limited recognition alongside its regional variant, Ulster Scots in Northern Ireland, without specific commitments to protection and promotion. As of April 2020, there are around 151,000 users of British Sign Language (BSL), a sign language used by deaf people, in the UK.

In 2013, it was estimated that 95 per cent of the UK's population were monolingual English speakers. In 2013, over 5 per cent of the population were estimated to speak languages brought to the UK as a result of immigration. South Asian languages are the largest group, which includes Punjabi, Urdu, Bengali, Sylheti, Hindi, Pahari-Pothwari, Tamil and Gujarati. In the 2011 census, Polish was the second-largest language spoken in England, with 546,000 speakers. In 2019 some three-quarters of a million people spoke little or no English.

=== Religion ===
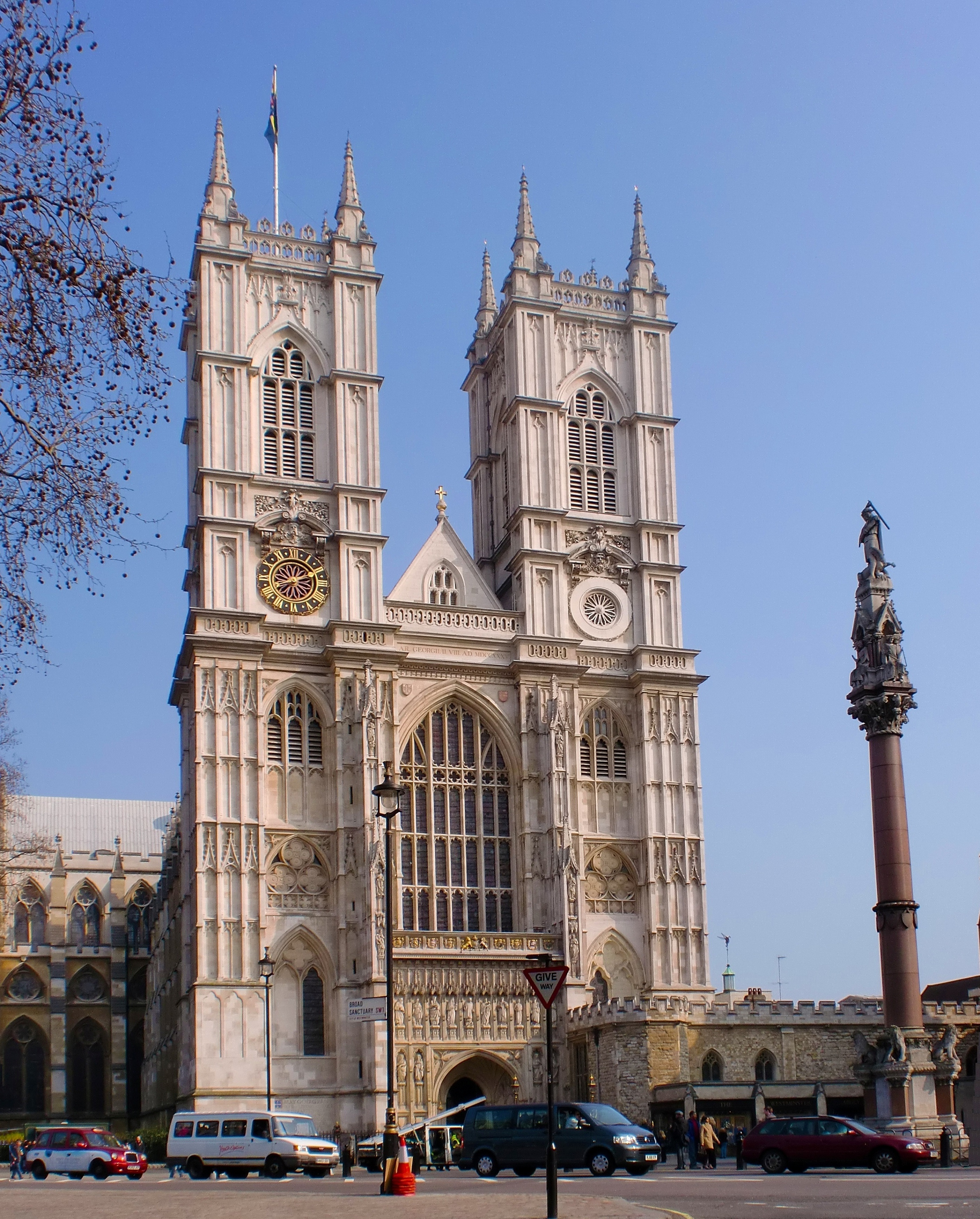
The Westminster Abbey in London. This was the coronation site of 40 monarchs, 18 royal burials, and at least 16 royal weddings since 1100.

Christianity has dominated religious life in the United Kingdom for more than 1,400 years. Although a majority of citizens still identify with Christianity in surveys, regular church attendance has fallen dramatically since the middle of the 20th century, while immigration and demographic change have contributed to the growth of Islam and other faiths. This has led some commentators to describe the UK as a multi-faith, secularised, or post-Christian society.

In the 2021 census of England and Wales, 46.2 per cent of respondents reported that they were Christians, with the next largest faiths being Islam (6.5 per cent), Hinduism (1.7 per cent), Sikhism (0.9 per cent), Buddhism (0.5 per cent), Judaism (0.5 per cent), and all other religions (0.6 per cent). Of the respondents, 37.2 per cent stated that they had no religion and a further 6.0 per cent did not answer the optional question. In the census of Northern Ireland, 42.3 per cent of the population was recorded as Catholic, 37.7% as Protestant or other Christian, 1.3 per cent as belonging to other religions, 17.4 per cent as having no religion and 1.6 per cent did not state a religion. In Scotland's 2022 census, 51.1 per cent of the population stated that they had no religion, 20.4 per cent were recorded as Church of Scotland, 13.3 per cent as Catholic, 5.1 per cent as other Christian, 2.2 per cent as Muslim and 0.6 per cent as Hindu, with 1.2 per cent belonging to other religions and 6.2 per cent not stating a religion.

A Tearfund survey in 2007 showed that one Briton in ten attends church weekly. Between the 2001 and 2011 censuses there was a 12 per cent decrease in those who identified as Christian, while the percentage reporting no religious affiliation doubled. This contrasted with growth in the other main religious group categories, with the number of Muslims increasing the most to about 5 per cent.

The Church of England is the established church in England. It retains representation in the UK Parliament, and the British monarch is its Supreme Governor. In Scotland the Church of Scotland is the national church. It is not subject to state control, and the British monarch is an ordinary member, required to swear an oath to "maintain and preserve the Protestant Religion and Presbyterian Church Government" upon his or her accession. The Church in Wales was disestablished in 1920 and, because the Church of Ireland was disestablished in 1870 before the partition of Ireland, there is no established church in Northern Ireland. Although there are no UK-wide data in the 2001 census on adherence to individual Christian denominations, it has been estimated that 62 per cent of Christians are Anglican, 13.5 per cent Catholic, 6 per cent Presbyterian, and 3.4 per cent Methodist, with smaller numbers of other denominations.

=== Education ===
Education in the United Kingdom is a devolved matter, with each country having a separate education system. About 38 per cent of the United Kingdom population has a university or college degree, the highest percentage in Europe and one of the highest in the world. The UK is home to many universities, including the University of Oxford and University of Cambridge, which often achieve first place on global rankings.

University education has varied tuition fees in different regions of the UK. England and Wales have a fixed maximum annual fee for all UK citizens, contingent on attaining a certain level of income. Only those who reach a certain salary threshold pay this fee through general taxation. Northern Ireland and Scotland have a reduced maximum fee or no fee for citizens where it is their home region. Some NHS courses have bursaries which pay the fee and in 2017 it was stated that each doctor gets subsidised by £230,000 during their training.

In 2022 the Programme for International Student Assessment (PISA) ranked the overall knowledge and skills of British 15-year-olds as 14th in the world in reading, mathematics and science. The average British student scored 494, above the OECD average of 478.

=== Health ===
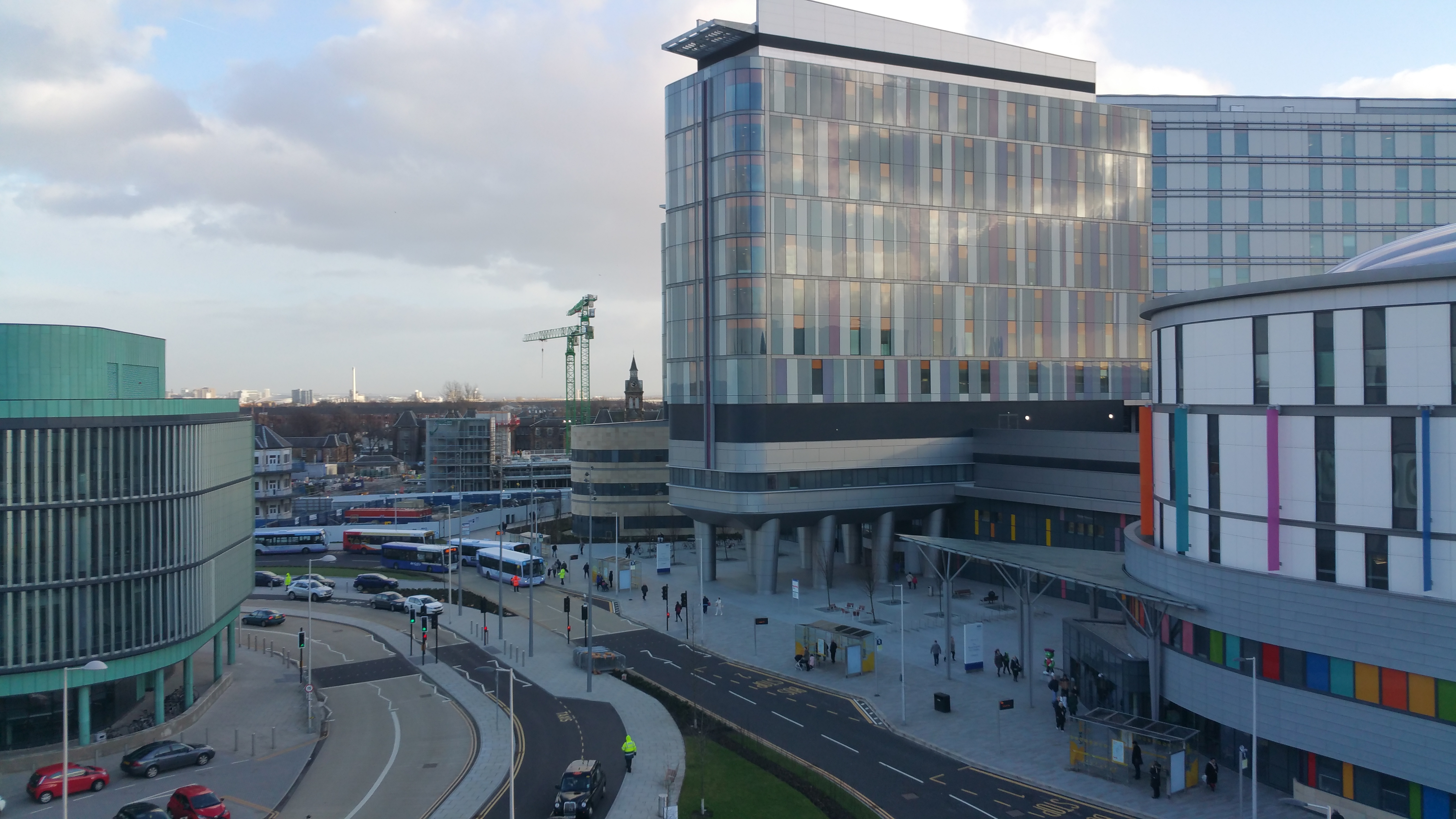
NHS Scotland's Queen Elizabeth University Hospital in Glasgow, the largest hospital campus in Europe

The modern system of universal publicly funded healthcare in the United Kingdom has its origins in the establishment of the National Health Service (NHS), which began operating in 1948 as the primary healthcare provider in the United Kingdom. The widespread popularity of the NHS has led to it being described as a "national religion". Healthcare in the United Kingdom is a devolved matter and each country has its own system of universal publicly funded healthcare (NHS in England, NHS Scotland, Health and Social Care in Northern Ireland and NHS Wales), although private healthcare is also available. Public healthcare is provided to all UK permanent residents and is mostly free at the point of need, being paid for from general taxation. The World Health Organization, in 2000, ranked the provision of healthcare in the United Kingdom as fifteenth-best in Europe and eighteenth in the world.

Since 1979 expenditure on healthcare has increased significantly. The 2018 OECD data, which incorporates in health a chunk of what in the UK is classified as social care, has the UK spending £3,121 per person. In 2017 the UK spent £2,989 per person on healthcare, near the median for members of the Organisation for Economic Co-operation and Development.

Regulatory bodies are organised on a UK-wide basis such as the General Medical Council, the Nursing and Midwifery Council and non-governmental-based, such as the Royal Colleges. Political and operational responsibility for healthcare lies with four national governments; healthcare in England is the responsibility of the UK Government; healthcare in Northern Ireland is the responsibility of the Northern Ireland Executive; healthcare in Scotland is the responsibility of the Scottish Government; and healthcare in Wales is the responsibility of the Welsh Government.

== Culture ==
The culture of the United Kingdom is influenced by the nation's island status, its history, and being a political union of four countries with each preserving distinctive traditions, customs and symbolism. British influence can be observed in the language, culture and legal systems of many of its former colonies, in particular the United States, Australia, Canada, New Zealand and Ireland, a common culture known as the Anglosphere. Most of its former colonies are Commonwealth countries, bonded by a shared British inheritance. A global survey in 2024 ranked the UK third in the 'Most Influential Countries' rankings, behind the US and China.

=== Literature and drama ===
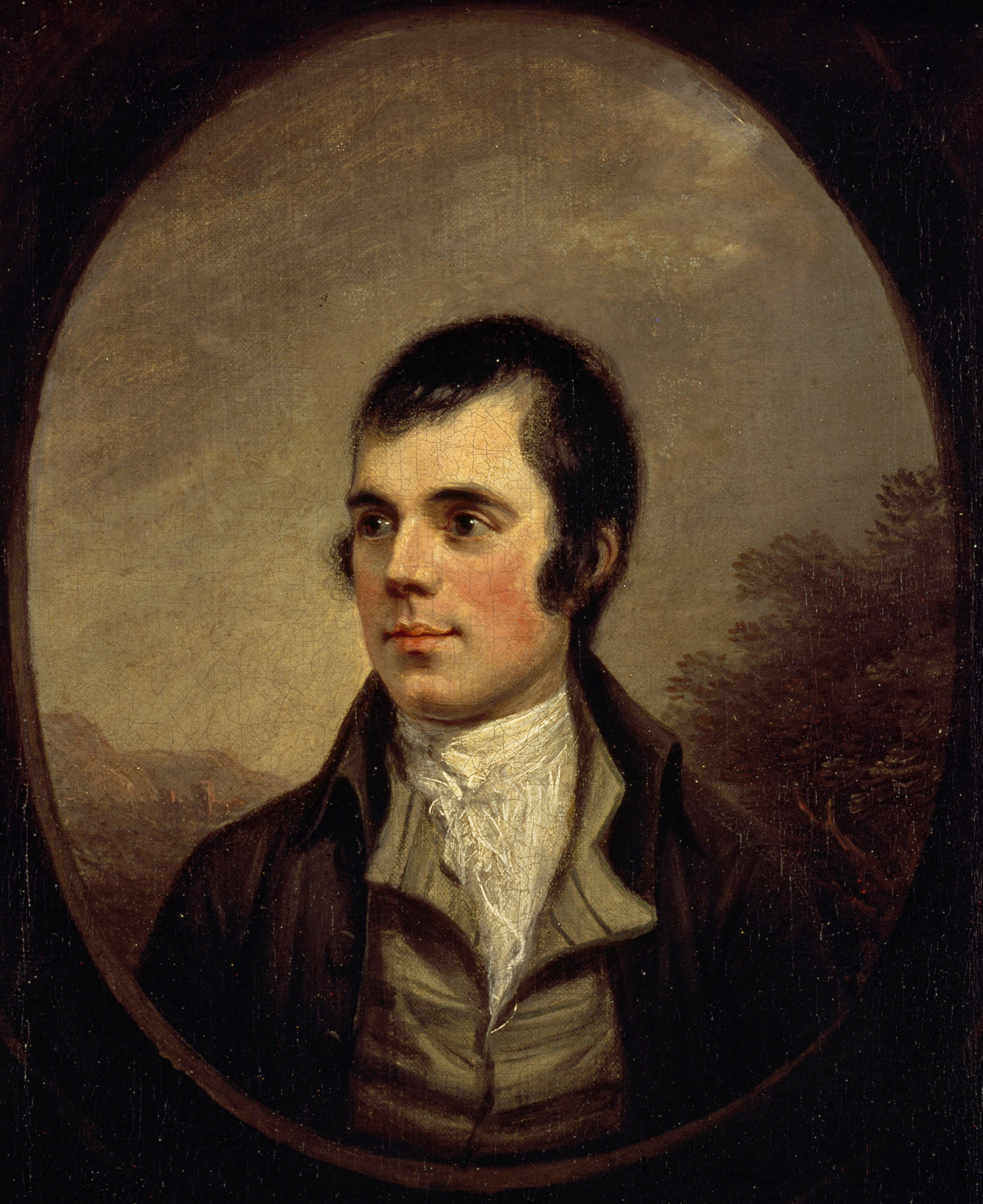
Robert Burns (1759–1796)

William Shakespeare (1564–1616)

Burns and Shakespeare are considered the national poets of Scotland and England respectively.

British literature includes that associated with the United Kingdom, the Isle of Man and the Channel Islands. Most British literature is in English. In 2022, 669 million physical books were sold in the UK, the most ever. Britain is renowned for children's literature; writers include Daniel Defoe, Rudyard Kipling, Lewis Carroll and Beatrix Potter, who also illustrated her own books. Other writers include A. A. Milne, Enid Blyton, J. R. R. Tolkien, Roald Dahl, Terry Pratchett and J. K. Rowling, who wrote Harry Potter, the best-selling book series of all time.

The playwright and poet William Shakespeare is generally regarded as the greatest dramatist ever and the national poet of England. Theatre of United Kingdom plays an important part in British culture and has had a vibrant tradition of theatre since the Renaissance with roots going back to the Roman occupation. Other important figures in the literature of England are Geoffrey Chaucer, known for The Canterbury Tales, the poet William Wordsworth, and other Romantic poets, also the novelists Charles Dickens, H. G. Wells, George Orwell, Aldous Huxley and Ian Fleming. The 20th-century English crime writer Agatha Christie is the best-selling novelist in history. Twelve of the top 25 of 100 novels by British writers chosen by a BBC poll of global critics were written by women; these included works by George Eliot, Virginia Woolf, Charlotte Brontë, Emily Brontë, Mary Shelley, Jane Austen, Doris Lessing and Zadie Smith.

Scottish literature includes Arthur Conan Doyle (the creator of Sherlock Holmes), Sir Walter Scott, J. M. Barrie, Robert Louis Stevenson (whose novel Treasure Island strongly influenced the portrayal of pirates in the arts and popular culture), and the poet Robert Burns, who is considered the national poet of Scotland. More recently Hugh MacDiarmid and Neil M. Gunn contributed to the Scottish Renaissance, with grimmer works from Ian Rankin and Iain Banks. Edinburgh was UNESCO's first worldwide City of Literature.

Welsh literature includes Britain's oldest known poem, Y Gododdin, most likely composed in the late 6th century. It was written in Cumbric or Old Welsh and contains the earliest known reference to King Arthur. The Arthurian legend was further developed by Geoffrey of Monmouth. Dafydd ap Gwilym (fl. 1320–1370) is widely regarded as one of the greatest European poets of his age. Daniel Owen is credited as the first Welsh-language novelist, publishing Rhys Lewis in 1885. The best-known of the Anglo-Welsh poets are Dylan Thomas and R. S. Thomas, the latter nominated for the Nobel Prize in Literature in 1996. Leading Welsh novelists of the twentieth century include Richard Llewellyn and Kate Roberts.

Northern Ireland's most popular writer is C. S. Lewis, who was born in Belfast and wrote The Chronicles of Narnia. Irish writers, living at a time when all of Ireland was part of the United Kingdom, include Oscar Wilde, Bram Stoker (who wrote Dracula) and George Bernard Shaw. There have been many authors whose origins were from outside the United Kingdom but who moved to the UK, including Joseph Conrad, T. S. Eliot, Kazuo Ishiguro, Sir Salman Rushdie and Ezra Pound.

=== Philosophy ===
The United Kingdom is famous for "British Empiricism", a branch of the philosophy that states that only knowledge verified by experience is valid, and 'Scottish Philosophy', sometimes referred to as the 'Scottish School of Common Sense'. The most famous philosophers of British Empiricism are John Locke, George Berkeley (Note: Berkeley is in fact Irish but was called a 'British empiricist' due to the territory of what is now known as the Republic of Ireland being in the UK at the time.) and David Hume; while Dugald Stewart, Thomas Reid and William Hamilton were major exponents of the Scottish "common sense" school. Two Britons are also notable for the ethical theory of utilitarianism, a moral philosophy first used by Jeremy Bentham and later by John Stuart Mill in his short work Utilitarianism.

=== Media ===
The BBC, founded in 1922, is the United Kingdom's publicly funded radio, television and Internet broadcasting corporation, and is the oldest and largest broadcaster in the world. It operates television and radio stations across the UK and abroad and its domestic services are funded by the television licence. The BBC World Service is an international broadcaster owned and operated by the BBC, and the world's largest. It broadcasts radio news, speech and discussions in more than 40 languages.

Other major players in the UK media include ITV, which operates 11 of the 15 regional television broadcasters that make up the ITV Network, and Sky. Newspapers produced in the United Kingdom include the Daily Mail, The Guardian, The Telegraph, The Times, and the Financial Times. Magazines and journals published in the United Kingdom that have achieved worldwide circulation include The Spectator, The Economist, New Statesman and Radio Times.

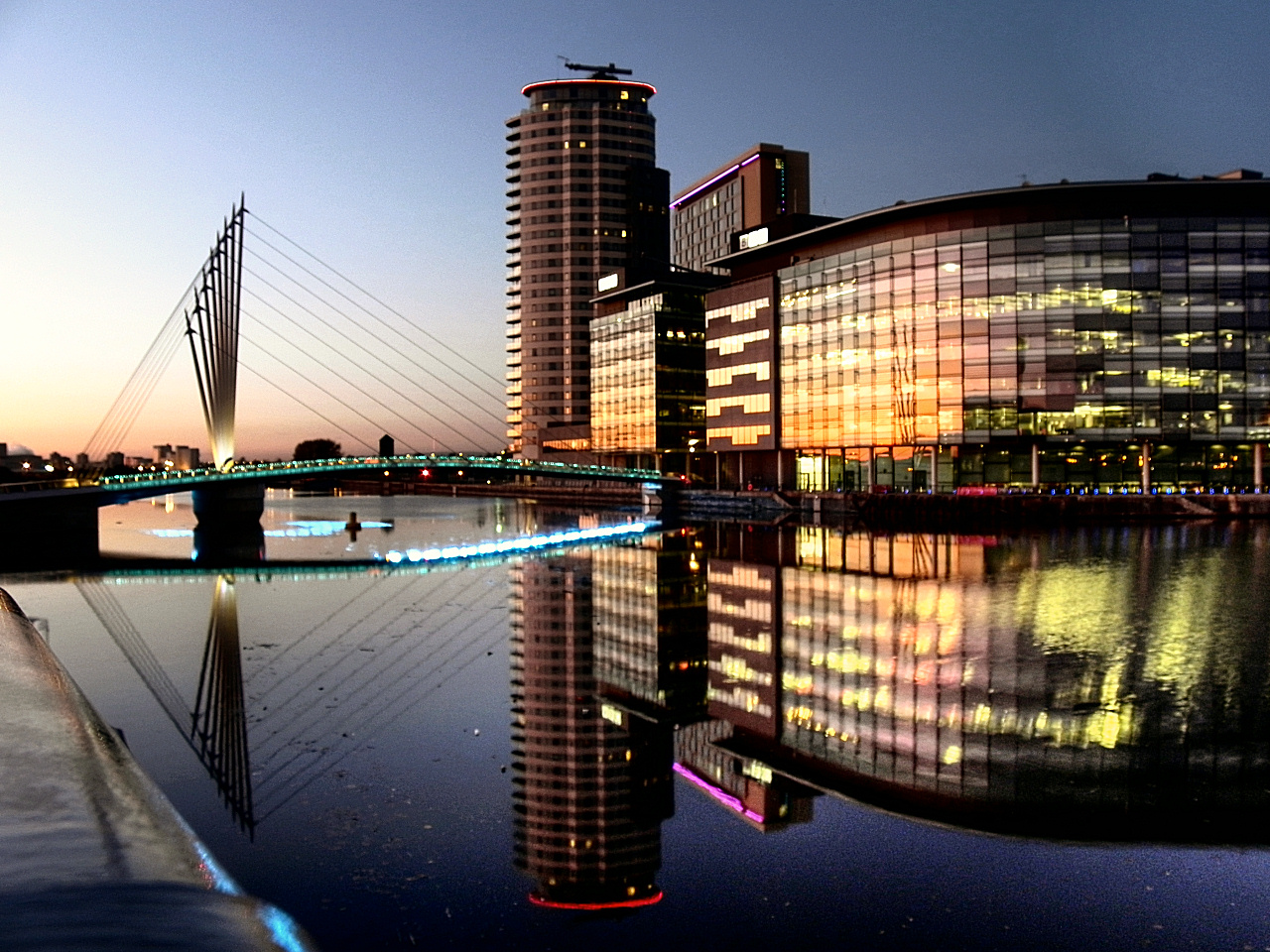
MediaCityUK in Salford is one of the largest media production facilities in Europe.

London dominates the media sector in the UK: national newspapers and television and radio are largely based there, although MediaCityUK in Manchester is also a significant national media centre. Edinburgh and Glasgow, and Cardiff, are important centres of newspaper and broadcasting production in Scotland and Wales, respectively. The UK publishing sector, including books, directories and databases, journals, magazines and business media, newspapers and news agencies, has a combined turnover of around £20 billion and employs 167,000 people. In 2015 the UK published 2,710 book titles per million inhabitants, more than any other country, with much of this exported to other Anglophone countries.

In 2010, 82.5 per cent of the population were Internet users, the highest proportion amongst the 20 countries with the largest total number of users in that year. The British video game industry is the largest in Europe, and since 2022 the UK has the largest video game market in Europe by sales. It is the world's third-largest producer of video games.

=== Visual art ===
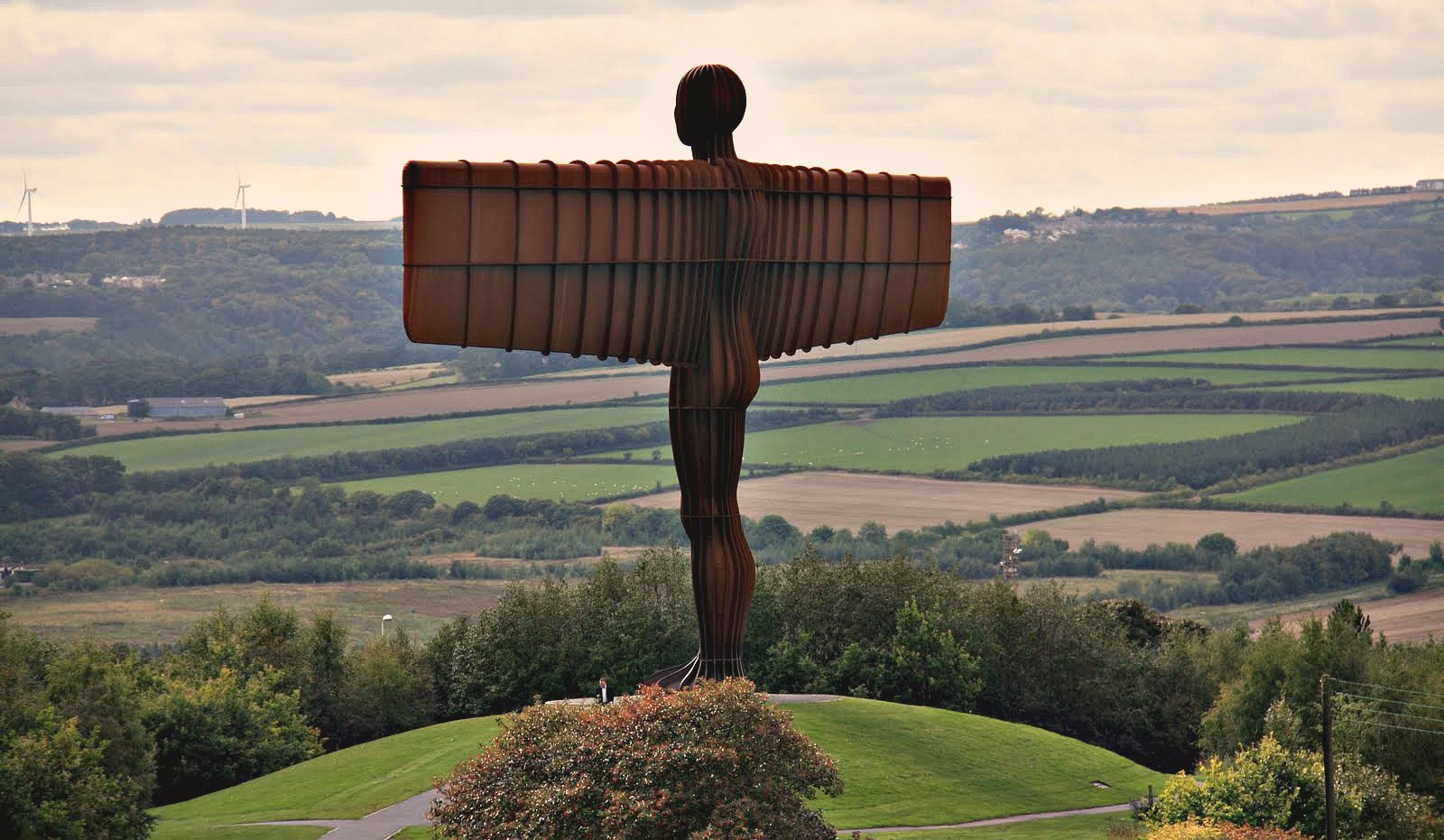
The Angel of the North sculpture by Antony Gormley has become a symbol of Northern England.

Major British artists include the Romantic artists William Blake, John Constable, Samuel Palmer, and J. M. W. Turner; the portrait painters Sir Joshua Reynolds and Lucian Freud; the landscape artists Thomas Gainsborough and L. S. Lowry; the pioneer of the Arts and Crafts movement William Morris; the figurative painter Francis Bacon; the Pop artists Peter Blake, Richard Hamilton and David Hockney; the pioneers of conceptual art movement Art & Language; the collaborative duo Gilbert and George; the abstract artist Howard Hodgkin; and the sculptors Antony Gormley, Anish Kapoor and Henry Moore. During the late 1980s and 1990s the Saatchi Gallery in London helped to bring to public attention a group of multi-genre artists who would become known as the "Young British Artists": Damien Hirst, Chris Ofili, Rachel Whiteread, Tracey Emin, Mark Wallinger, Steve McQueen, Sam Taylor-Wood and the Chapman Brothers are amongst the better-known members of this loosely affiliated movement.

The Royal Academy in London is a key organisation for the promotion of the visual arts in the United Kingdom. Major schools of art in the UK include: the six-school University of the Arts London, which includes the Central Saint Martins College of Art and Design and Chelsea College of Art and Design; Goldsmiths, University of London; the Slade School of Fine Art (part of University College London); the Glasgow School of Art; the Royal College of Art; and The Ruskin School of Drawing and Fine Art (part of the University of Oxford). The Courtauld Institute of Art is a leading centre for the teaching of the history of art. Important art galleries in the United Kingdom include the National Gallery, National Portrait Gallery, Tate Britain, and Tate Modern (the most-visited modern art gallery in the world, with around 4.7 million visitors per year).

=== Music ===
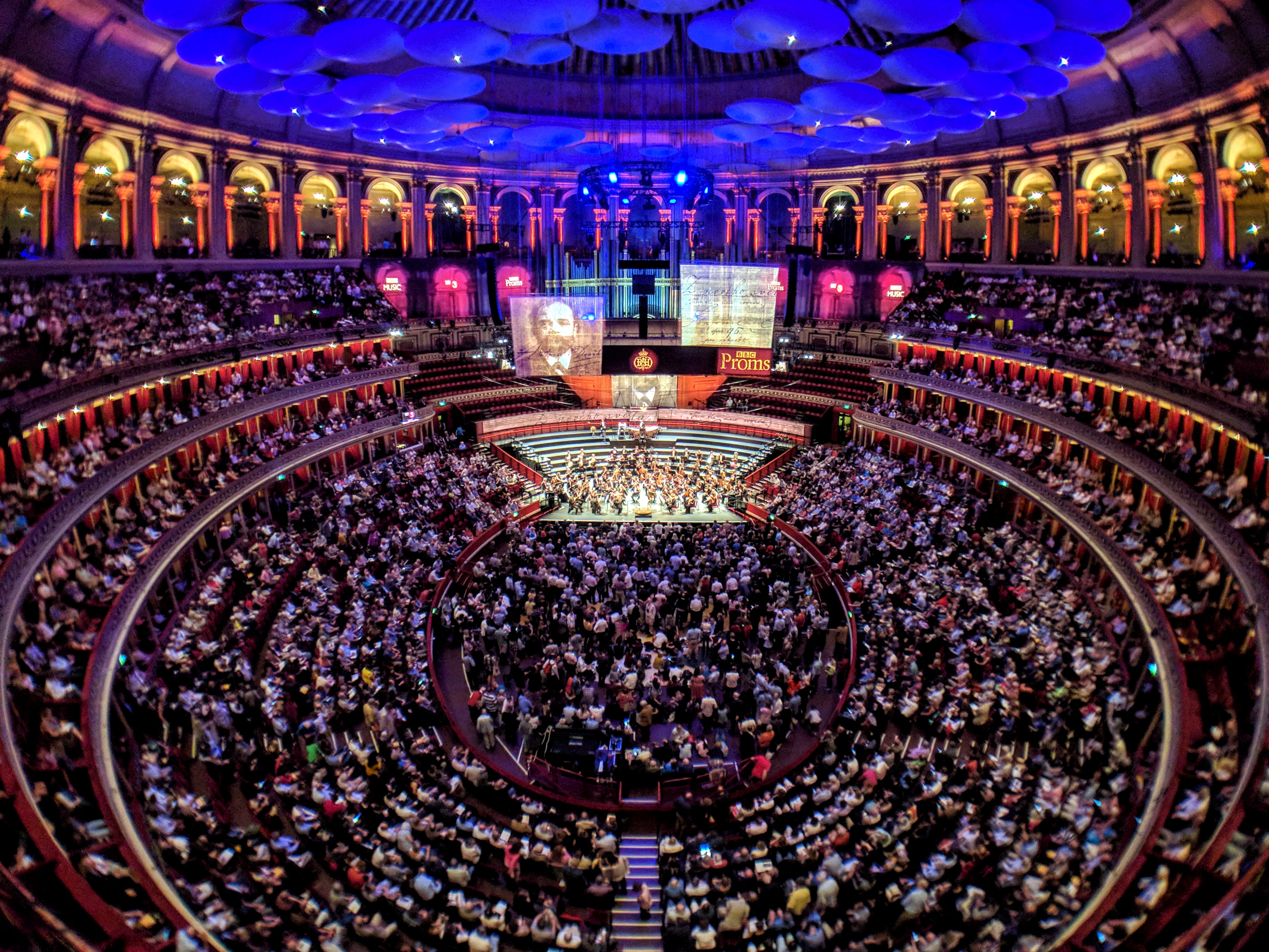
The Proms is a classical music festival, most closely associated with Henry Wood and held at the Royal Albert Hall in London, which regularly plays music by Edward Elgar and other British composers.

Various styles of music have become popular in the United Kingdom, including the folk music of England, Scotland, Wales and Northern Ireland. English folk features melodic ballads with strong lyrics and music for country dancing often using accordion and fiddles. Scottish folk features bagpipes and fiddles playing traditional dance tunes with bouncy tempos. Welsh folk has harps and vocal harmonies often sung in Welsh. Northern Irish folk blends fiddles with flutes merging Scottish and Irish influences.

Historically, there has been Renaissance music from the Tudor period, with masses, madrigals and lute music by Thomas Tallis, John Taverner, William Byrd, Orlando Gibbons and John Dowland. After the Stuart Restoration, an English tradition of dramatic masques, anthems and airs became established, led by Henry Purcell, followed by Thomas Arne and others. George Frideric Handel composed the anthem Zadok the Priest for the coronation of George II; it became the traditional ceremonial music for anointing all future monarchs. Handel's oratorios, such as his famous Messiah, were written in English.

In the second half of the 19th century, Arthur Sullivan and his librettist W. S. Gilbert wrote their popular Savoy operas, and Edward Elgar composed a wide range of music. Increasingly, composers became inspired by the English countryside and its folk music, notably Gustav Holst, Ralph Vaughan Williams and Benjamin Britten, a pioneer of modern British opera. Amongst the many post-war composers, some of the most notable have made their own personal choice of musical identity: Peter Maxwell Davies (Orkney), Harrison Birtwistle (mythological), and John Tavener (religious). Recent classical singers include Alfie Boe, Bryn Terfel, Katherine Jenkins, Michael Ball, Roderick Williams, Russell Watson and Sarah Brightman, while Nicola Benedetti and Nigel Kennedy are renowned for their violin ability.

According to The New Grove Dictionary of Music and Musicians the term "pop music" originated in Britain in the mid-1950s to describe rock and roll's fusion with the "new youth music". The Oxford Dictionary of Music states that artists such as the Beatles and the Rolling Stones drove pop music to the forefront of popular music in the early 1960s. Birmingham became known as the birthplace of heavy metal, with the band Black Sabbath starting there in the 1960s. Britain took part in the development of rock music, with British acts pioneering hard rock, raga rock, heavy metal, space rock, glam rock, Gothic rock, psychedelic rock and punk rock. British acts also developed neo soul and created dubstep. The UK has produced some of the most prominent English-speaking rappers along with the United States, including Stormzy, Kano, Yxng Bane, Ramz, Little Simz and Skepta.

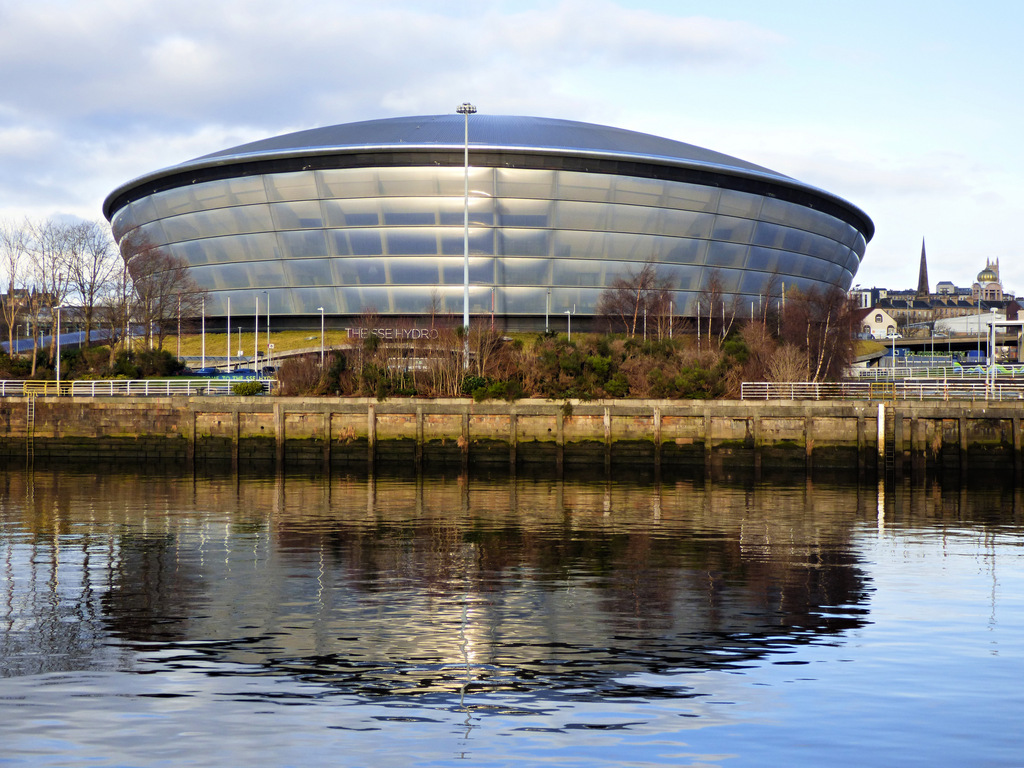
The OVO Hydro in Glasgow, Scotland, a 14,500-capacity arena consistently ranked within the top ten busiest venues worldwide

The Beatles have international sales of over 1 billion units and are the biggest-selling band, in addition to being widely regarded as the most influential band in the history of popular music. Other prominent British contributors to popular music over the last 50 years include the Rolling Stones, Pink Floyd, Queen, Led Zeppelin, the Bee Gees and Elton John, all of whom have worldwide record sales of 200 million or more. The Brit Awards are the BPI's annual music awards. Some of the British recipients of the Outstanding Contribution to Music award include the Who, David Bowie, Eric Clapton, Rod Stewart, the Police and Fleetwood Mac (who are a British-American band). More recent UK music acts that have had international success include George Michael, Oasis, Spice Girls, Radiohead, Coldplay, Arctic Monkeys, Robbie Williams, Amy Winehouse, Susan Boyle, Adele, Ed Sheeran, Lewis Capaldi, One Direction, Harry Styles and Dua Lipa. As of 2024 the UK is the world's third-largest music market, and in 2021 was the second-largest exporter of music.

Many British cities are known for their music. Acts from Liverpool have had 54 UK chart number 1 hit singles, more per capita than any other city worldwide. Glasgow's contribution was recognised in 2008 when it was named a City of Music by UNESCO. Manchester played a role in the spread of dance music such as acid house, and from the mid-1990s, Britpop. London and Bristol are closely associated with the origins of electronic music sub-genres such as drum and bass and trip hop.

UK dance music traces its roots back to the black British Sound System Culture and the New Age Traveller movement of the 60s and 70s, it also has influences from the Chicago House and Detroit techno scenes. In the late 1980s, dance music exploded with Rave culture mainly Acid House tracks which were made mainstream with novelty records (such as Smart E's Sesame's Treet and the Prodigy's Charly) and the Balearic sound brought back from the Ibiza club scene. This led to genres such as UK Garage, Speed Garage, Drum and bass, Jungle, Trance, and Dubstep. Influential UK dance acts past and present include 808 State, Orbital, the Prodigy, Underworld, Roni Size, Leftfield, Massive Attack, Groove Armada, Fatboy Slim, Faithless, Basement Jaxx, Chemical Brothers, Disclosure, Calvin Harris, and Fred Again. Other influential UK DJs include Judge Jules, Pete Tong, Carl Cox, Paul Oakenfold, John Digweed and Sasha.

=== Cinema ===
The United Kingdom has had a considerable influence on the history of the cinema. The British directors Alfred Hitchcock, whose film Vertigo is considered by some critics as the best film of all time, and David Lean, who directed Lawrence of Arabia, are amongst the most critically acclaimed directors ever. Recent popular directors include Christopher Nolan, Sam Mendes, Steve McQueen, Richard Curtis, Danny Boyle, Tony Scott and Ridley Scott. Many British actors have achieved international fame and critical success. Some of the most commercially successful films have been produced in the United Kingdom, including two of the highest-grossing film franchises (Harry Potter and James Bond).

2019 was a particularly good year for British films which grossed around £10.3 billion globally, accounting for 28.7 per cent of global box office revenue. UK box-office takings totalled £1.25 billion in 2019, with around 176 million admissions. In 2023 UK film and television studio stage space stood at 6.9 million sq ft, with 1 million sq ft added in the past year with more in development. The annual BAFTA Film Awards are hosted by the British Academy of Film and Television Arts.

=== Cuisine ===
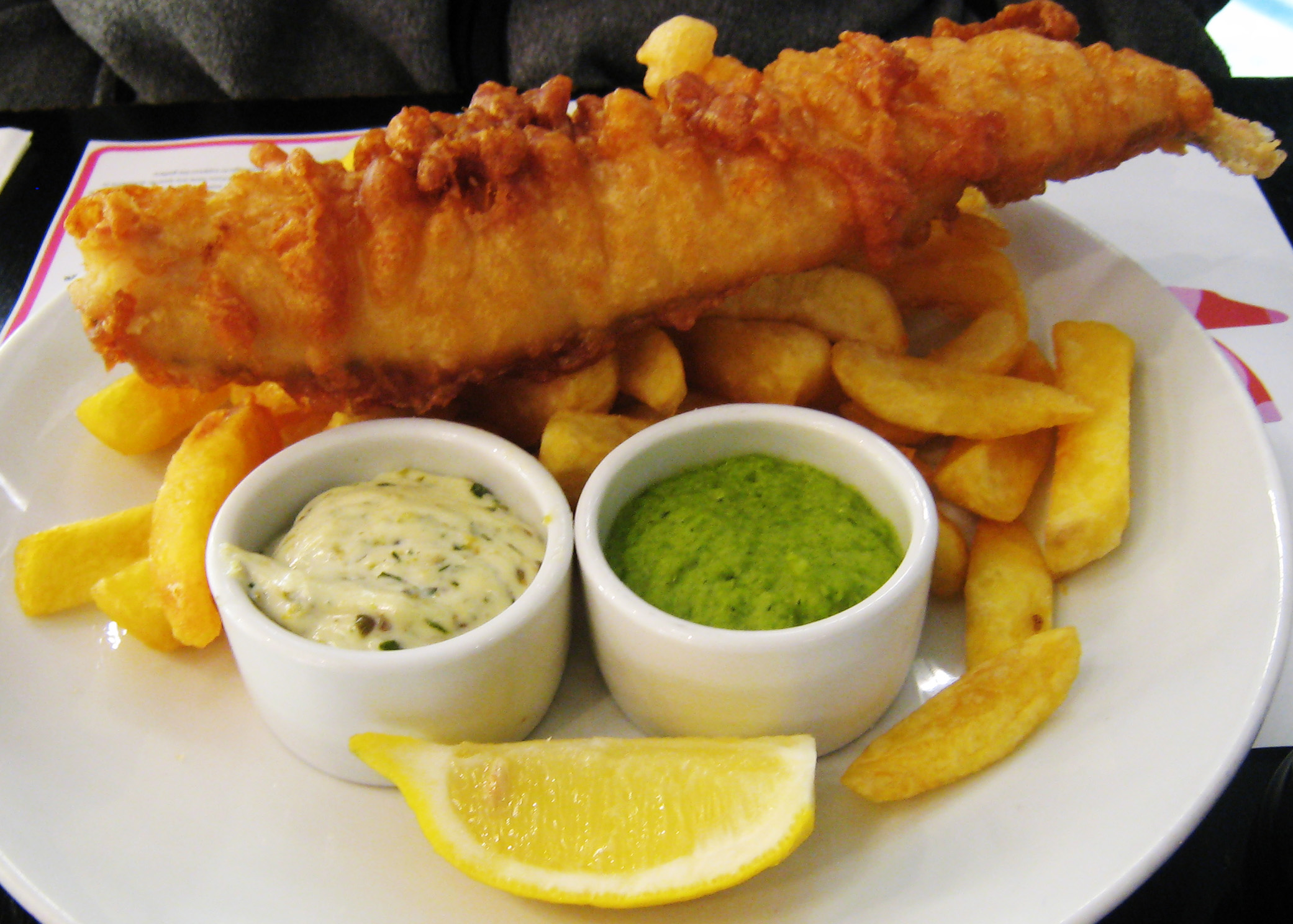
Fish and chips, a traditional British dish, served with lemon, tartar sauce and mushy peas

British cuisine developed from influences reflective of its land, settlements, arrivals of new settlers and immigrants, trade and colonialism. The food of England has historically been characterised by simplicity of approach and a reliance on the high quality of natural produce. The traditional Sunday roast is one example, featuring a roast joint (usually of beef), lamb, chicken, or pork, often free range (and generally grass-fed, in the case of beef). Roasts are served with roasted or boiled vegetables, Yorkshire pudding and gravy. Other traditional meals include meat pies and stews. A poll by YouGov in 2019 rated classic British food, with more than 80 per cent liking the Sunday roast, Yorkshire pudding, fish and chips, crumpets and the full English breakfast.

The UK is home to a large selection of fine dining. The nation hosts multiple restaurant guides such as The Good Food Guide and Harden's. In 2025 there were 197 restaurants with a Michelin Star; ten have received a three-star rating. There is a long list of British desserts. Afternoon tea is a light afternoon meal served with tea in tea rooms and hotels, with the tradition dating back to around 1840. A poll from July 2024 revealed that 3 per cent of the UK population follow a vegan diet, 6 per cent are vegetarian, and 13 per cent identify as flexitarian (following a mainly vegetarian diet). The British Empire facilitated knowledge of Indian cuisine. British cuisine has absorbed the cultural influence of those who have settled in Britain, producing hybrid dishes, such as chicken tikka masala.

The UK has many gastropubs and is the birthplace of many alcoholic drinks including several beer styles such as pale ale, India pale ale, bitter, brown ale, porter, and stout. The number of craft beers and microbreweries has expanded rapidly in the last two decades. Other popular alcoholic drinks produced in the UK include Scotch whisky, English wine, gin, perry and cider.

=== Sport ===
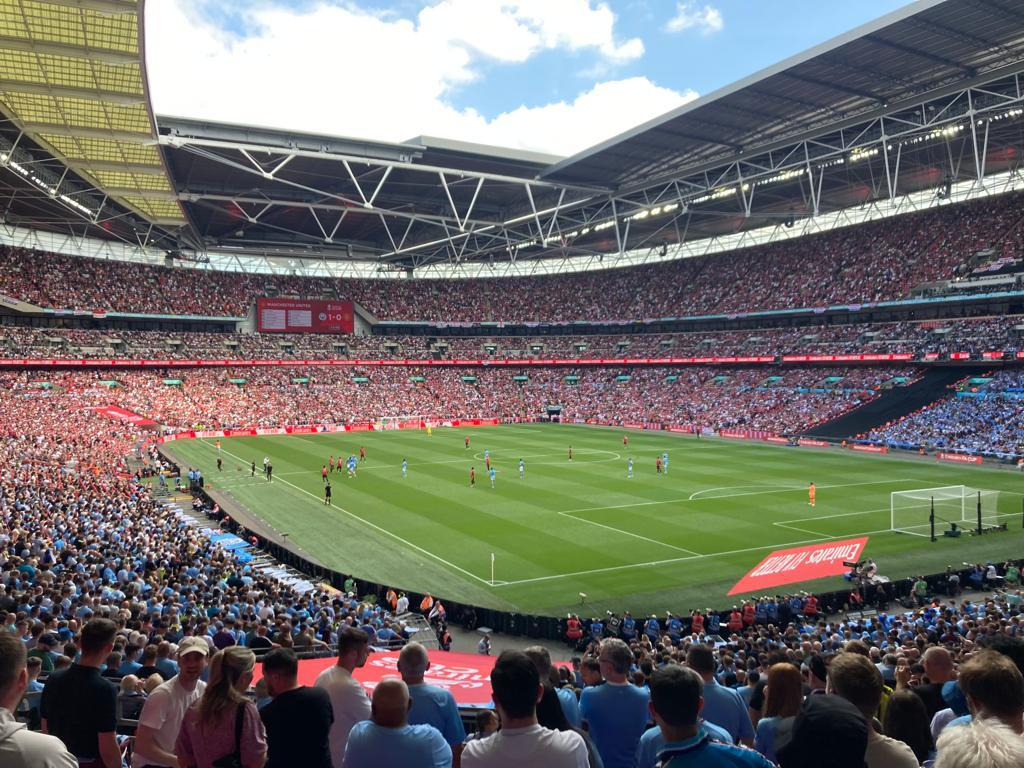
The 2023 FA Cup final at Wembley Stadium between Manchester City and Manchester United

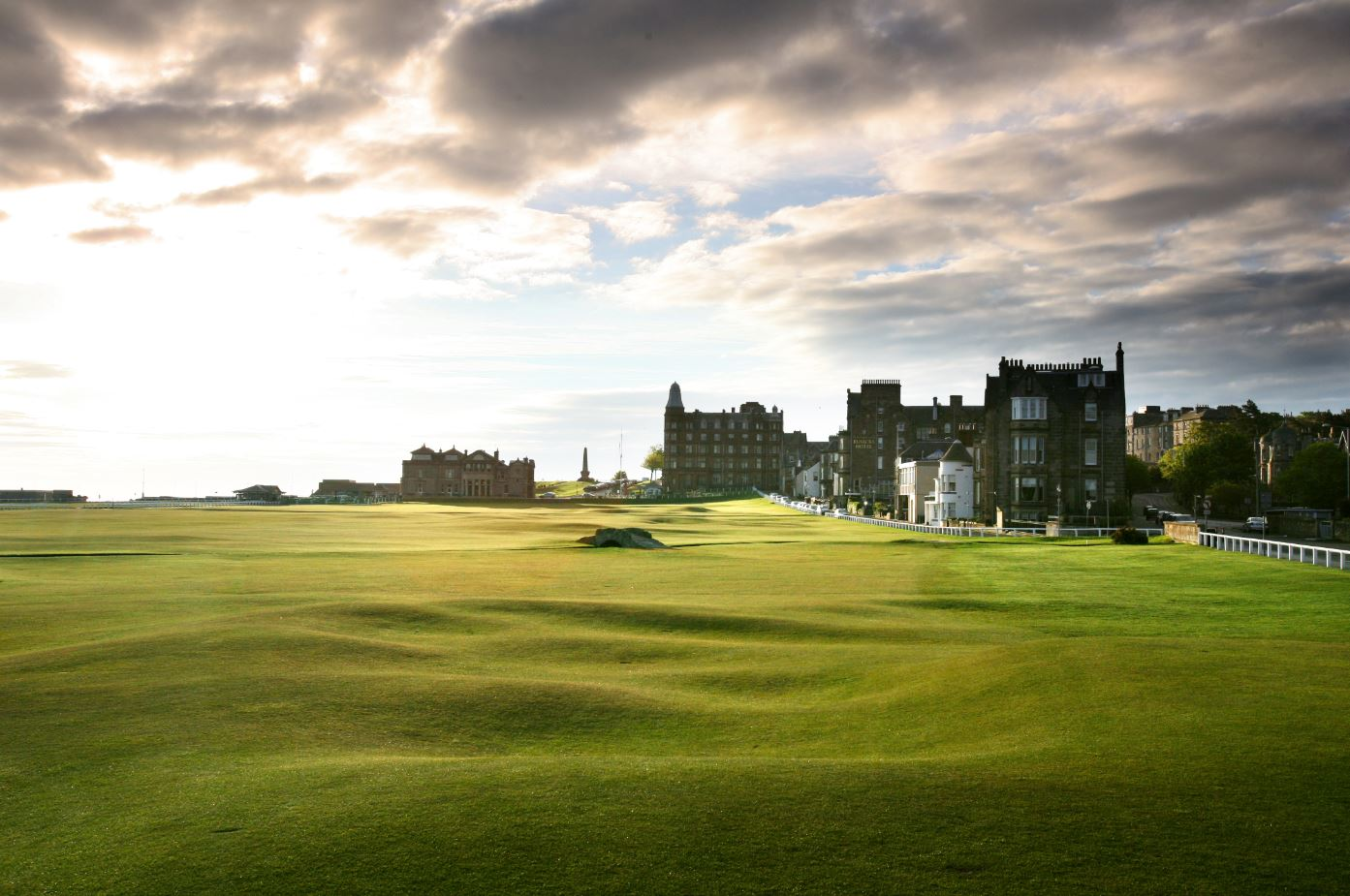
Golf originated from the Old Course at St Andrews in Scotland

Association football, tennis, table tennis, badminton, rugby union, rugby league, rugby sevens, golf, boxing, netball, water polo, field hockey, billiards, darts, rowing, rounders and cricket originated or were substantially developed in the UK. (Note: In 2012, the president of the IOC, Jacques Rogge, stated, "This great, sports-loving country is widely recognised as the birthplace of modern sport. It was here that the concepts of sportsmanship and fair play were first codified into clear rules and regulations. It was here that sport was included as an educational tool in the school curriculum.")

A poll in 2003 found that football is the most popular sport in the UK. England is recognised by FIFA as the birthplace of club football, and the Football Association is the oldest of its kind, with the rules of football first drafted in 1863 by Ebenezer Cobb Morley. Each of the Home Nations (England, Scotland, Wales and Northern Ireland) has its own football association, national team and league system, and each is individually a governing member of the International Football Association Board alongside FIFA. The English top division, the Premier League, is the most watched football league in the world. The first international football match was contested by England and Scotland on 30 November 1872. England, Scotland, Wales and Northern Ireland usually compete as separate countries in international competitions.

In 2003 rugby union was ranked the second-most-popular sport in the UK. The sport was created in Rugby School, Warwickshire, and the first rugby international took place on 27 March 1871 between England and Scotland. England, Scotland, Wales, Ireland, France and Italy compete in the Six Nations Championship, the premier international rugby union tournament in the northern hemisphere. Sports governing bodies in England, Scotland, Wales and Ireland organise and regulate the game separately. Every four years the Home Nations make a combined team known as the British and Irish Lions which tours Australia, New Zealand and South Africa.

The United Kingdom hosted the Summer Olympic Games in 1908, 1948 and 2012, with London acting as the host city on all three occasions. Birmingham hosted the 2022 Commonwealth Games, the seventh time a country of the United Kingdom hosted the Commonwealth Games (England, Scotland and Wales have each hosted the Commonwealth Games at least once).

=== Symbols ===
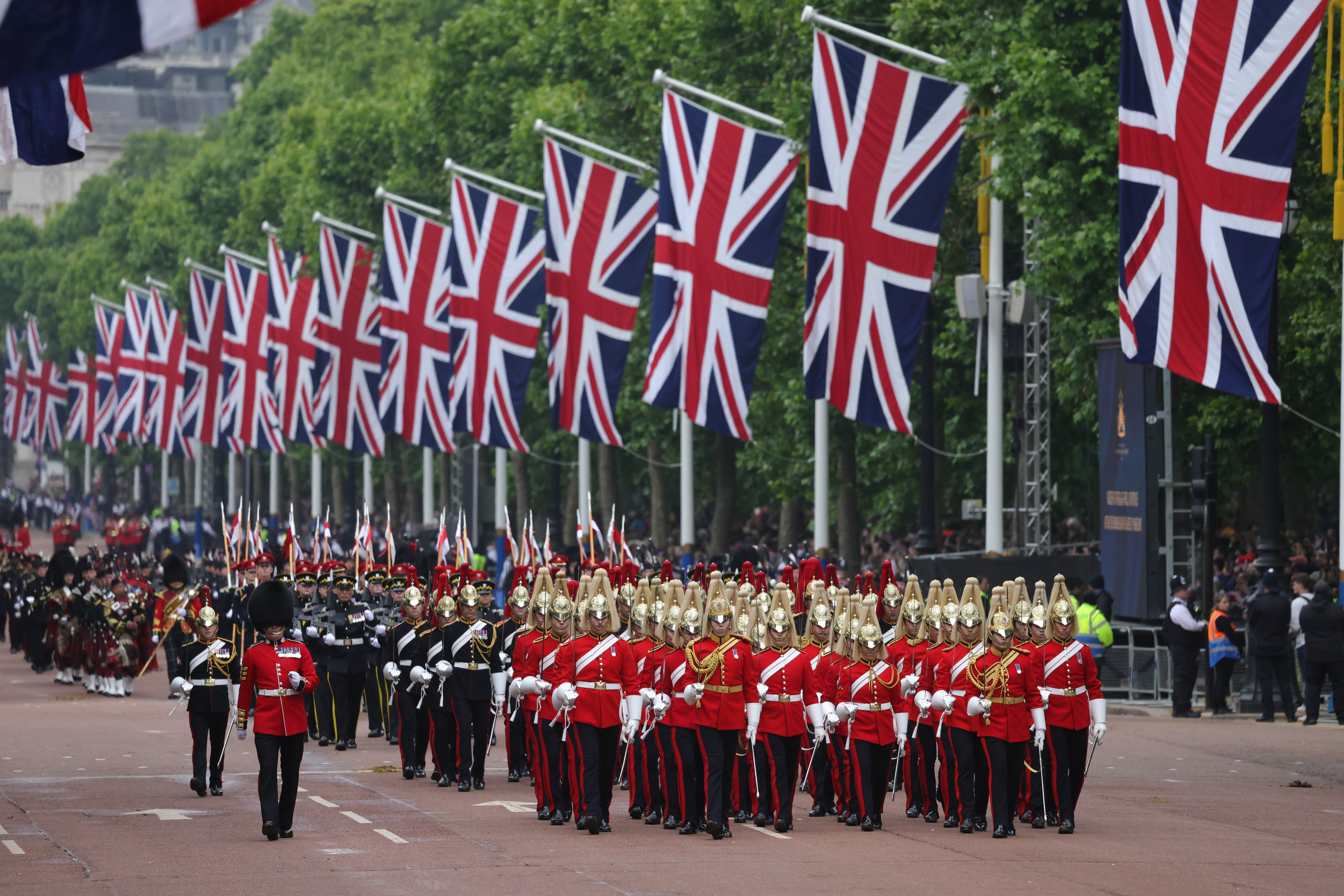
Union Jack flags on The Mall, London

The flag of the United Kingdom is the Union Flag, which is also referred to as the Union Jack. It was created in 1606 by the superimposition of the flag of England, representing Saint George, on the flag of Scotland, representing Saint Andrew, and was updated in 1801 with the addition of Saint Patrick's Flag. Wales is not represented in the Union Flag, as Wales had been annexed to England prior to the formation of the United Kingdom. The possibility of redesigning the Union Flag to include representation of Wales was discussed in 2007. The national anthem of the United Kingdom is "God Save the King", with "King" replaced with "Queen" in the lyrics whenever the monarch is a woman.

England, Wales and Scotland each have their own national symbols, including their national flags. Northern Ireland also has symbols, many of which are shared with the Republic of Ireland, but has no official flag. Beside the Lion and the Unicorn and the Welsh Dragon of heraldry, the bulldog is also used and commonly represented with the Union Flag. Great Britain, rather than the United Kingdom as a whole, also has personifications representing it, two of which are Britannia and John Bull.

== See also ==
- Outline of the United Kingdom
  - Outline of England
  - Outline of Northern Ireland
  - Outline of Scotland
  - Outline of Wales
- Historiography of the United Kingdom
