= Aletheia (disambiguation) =

Aletheia (ἀλήθεια) is truth or disclosure in philosophy.

Aletheia may also refer to:

- 259 Aletheia, a large asteroid
- Aletheia (album), 2013 album by Hope for the Dying
- "Aletheia" (Person of Interest), an episode of the TV series Person of Interest
- Aletheia M. D., author of the 1897 Rationalist's Manual
- Aletheia University, a university in New Taipei, Taiwan
- Alethia, a poetic adaptation of the Book of Genesis into Latin by Claudius Marius Victorius
- Aletheia, the Greek version of Veritas, the Roman goddess of truth

== See also ==
- Alethea, a female given name
- Aleteia, a Catholic news and information website
- Aletheian, a Christian death metal band
- Alethiometer, a "truth teller" device in Philip Pullman's fantasy novel trilogy His Dark Materials
