= Verity (name) =

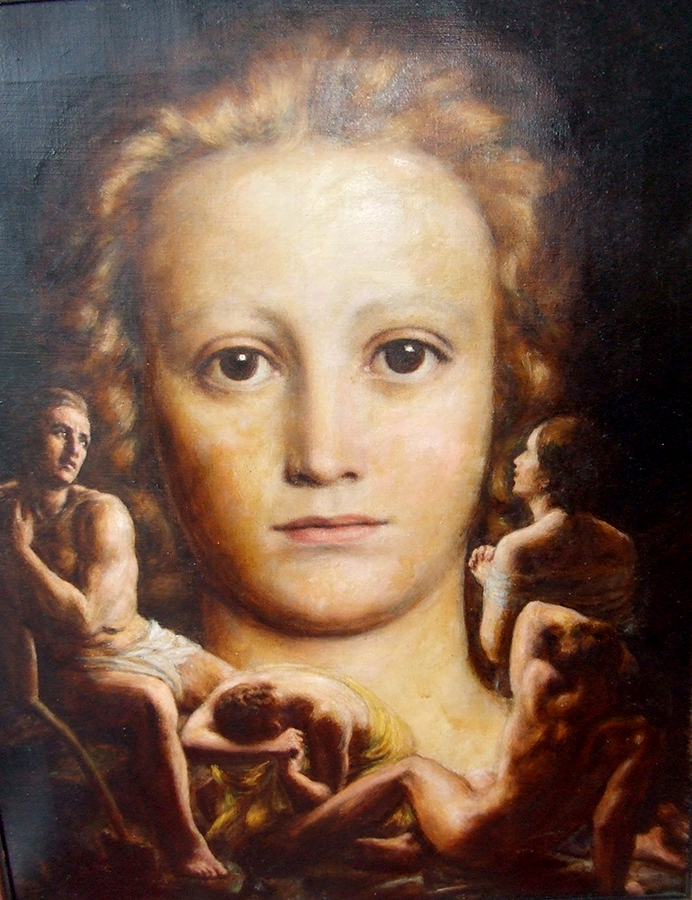
- Truth by Alfred Schwarzschild.
- Gender: feminine

Origin
- Origin: Old French
- Meaning: truth
- Region of origin: England

Other names
- Related names: Veretie, Verety, Verita, Veritie

Verity (alias Veretie, Verety, Verita, Veritie, etc.) is a female first name and a surname. As a first name it derives from the Latin feminine noun veritas, meaning "truth". It is thus an equivalent of Alethea, a female first name first used in England circa 1585, derived from the ancient and modern Greek feminine noun αλήθεια (pronounced "al-ee-thia"), meaning "truth". It was adopted in England as a Puritan and Quaker virtue name, truthfulness being considered as a desirable attribute especially in women, and following a new Protestant tradition of naming children after virtues instead of saints in order to avoid supposed idolatry.

Verity is also a surname, which may have more ancient unrelated origins, possibly being a corruption of a similar word.

== First name ==
- Verity Crawley (born 1994), English professional bowler
- Verity Barton (born 1985), Australian (Queensland) politician
- Verity Firth (born 1973), Australian politician
- Verity James, Australian TV and radio presenter
- Verity Lambert (1935–2007), English television producer
- Verity Laughton (born 1952), Australian playwright
- Verity Marshall (born 1986), English actress
- Verity Rushworth (born 1985), English actress
- Verity Sharp (born 1970), English broadcast radio personality
- Verity Smith, British rugby player and LGBT+ rights activist
- Verity Snook-Larby (born 1970), English race walker
- Verity Stob, a British satirical IT columnist

== Fictional characters ==
- Verity, the assistant of Fred and George Weasley in Weasleys’ Wizard Wheezes in Harry Potter and the Half-Blood Prince
- Verity Hunt, the murder victim in the novel Nemesis by Agatha Christie
- Verity Poldark Blamey, recurring character in the 2015 television series Poldark
- Verity Price, character in the InCryptid novel series
- Verity Simone Carlo, character in the IDW Publishing Transformers comic series
- Verity, the main antagonist of the Verity Minecraft horror web series created by ThatMob

== Surname ==
- Anthony Verity (born 1939), English educationalist and classical scholar
- Charles Verity (1814–1899), English stone mason, building contractor and mayor of Doncaster
- Charlotte Verity (born 1954), British painter
- Claude Hamilton Verity (1880–1949), English hardware merchant, engineer and inventor
- Elsie Eleanor Verity (1894–1971), "The First Lady of the motor trade"
- Fred Verity (1847–1897), English engineer, inventor, iron founder, brass-founder, manufacturer and retailer of ironmongery
- Hedley Verity (1905–1943), English cricketer
- Hugh Verity (1918-2001), British RAF and SOE pilot
- Jake Verity (born 1997), American football player
- John Verity (born 1949), English guitarist
- Ruggero Verity (1883–1959), Italian physician and entomologist
- Simon Verity (1945-2004), British sculptor, master stone carver and letter cutter
- Thomas Verity, an English architect (1837 – 1891)
- William Verity Jr. (1917–2007), American businessman and government official
