= Alethea =

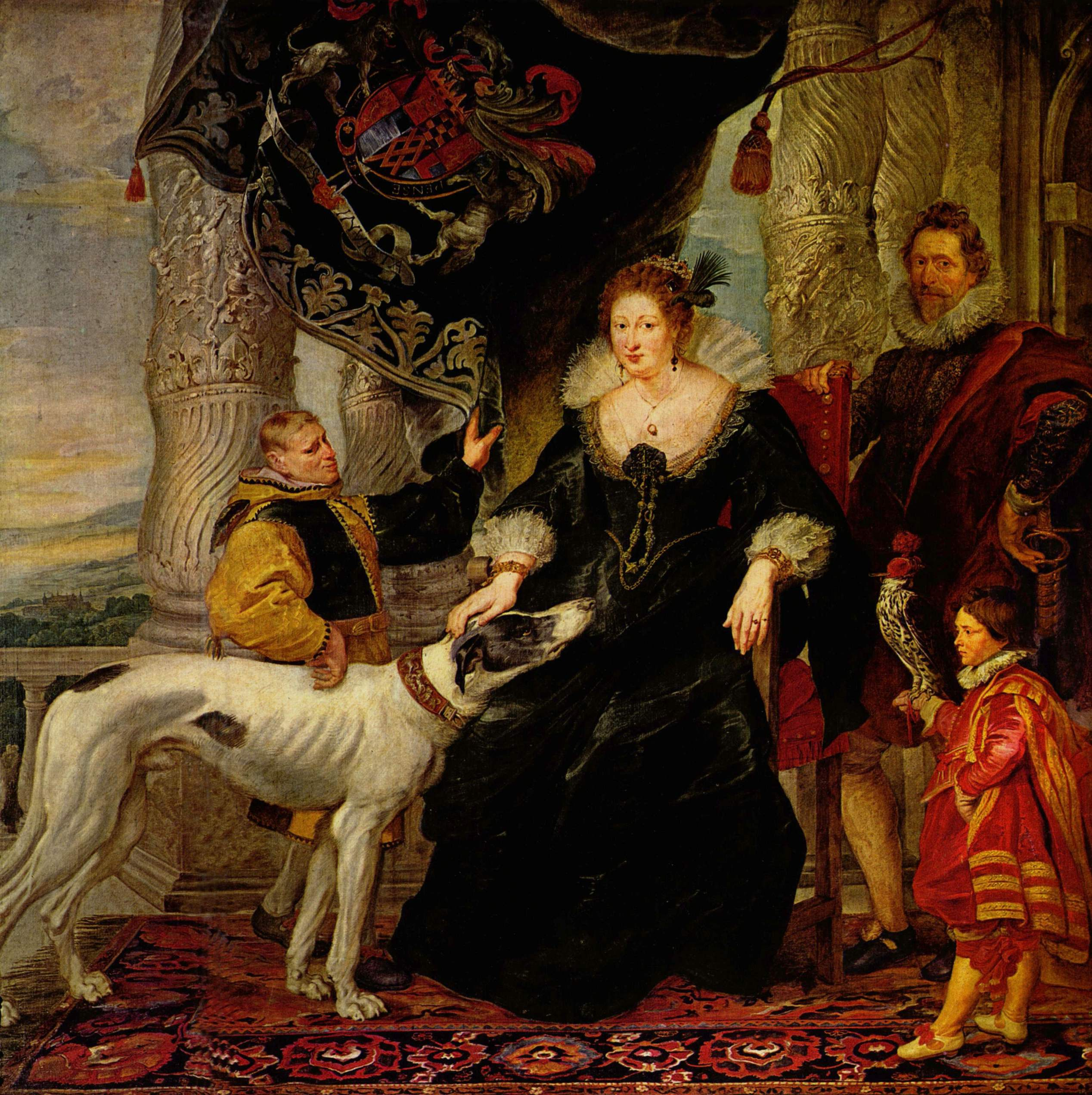
- Alethea Howard, Countess of Arundel, 17th-century portrait by Peter Paul Rubens
- Pronunciation: [alɛ̌ːtʰeː.a] (Modern Greek pronunciation [aˈliθça]) ə-LEE-thee-ə, AL-ə-THEE-ə or ə-LAY-thee-ə
- Gender: Female
- Language: Greek

Origin
- Meaning: truth

Other names
- Related names: Alafair, Alethaire, Alethia, Aletheia, Thea, Theia, Tia, Thia, Verity

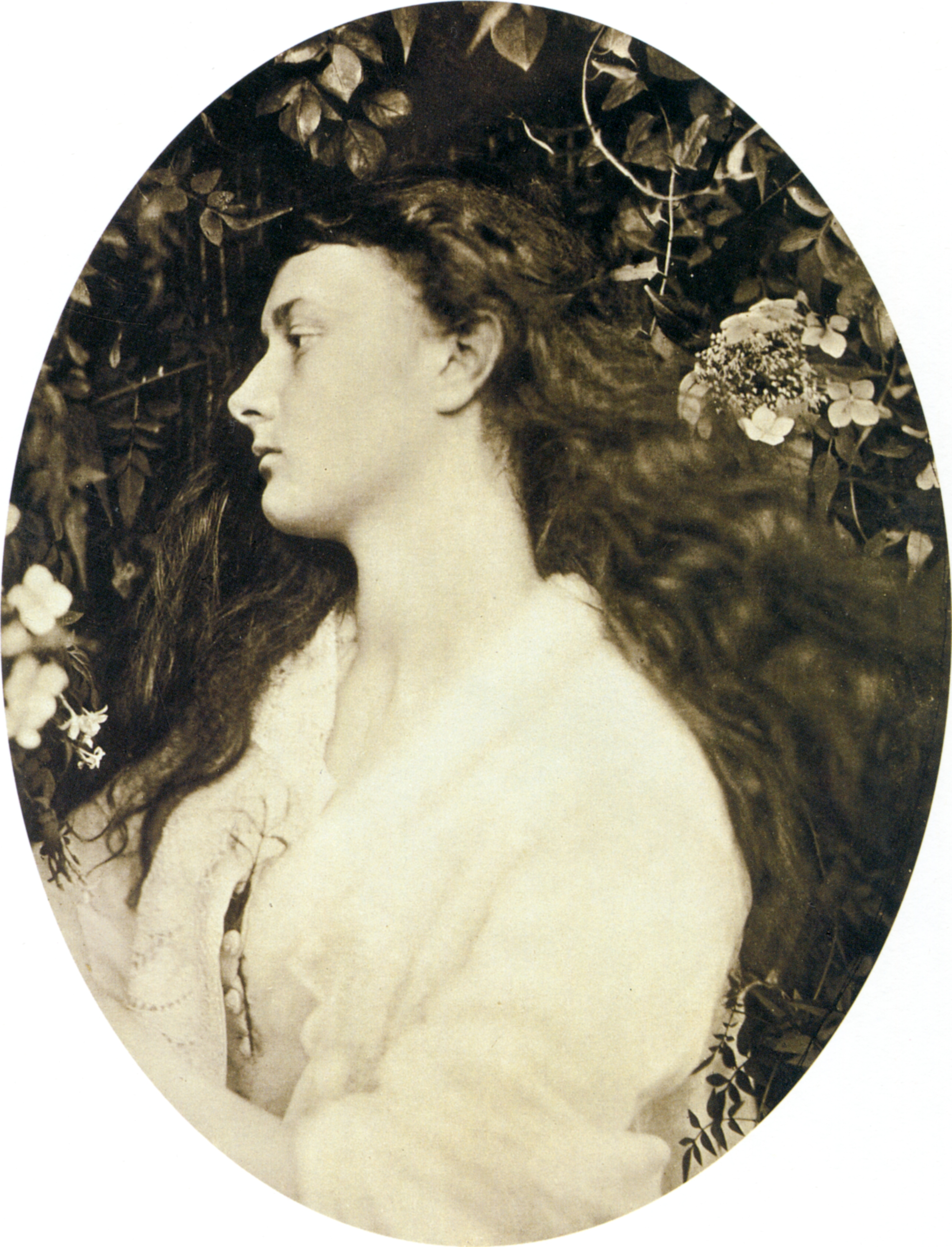
Alice Liddell as the goddess Aletheia, photographed by Julia Margaret Cameron in 1872.

Alethea is an English-language female first name derived from the Ancient Greek feminine noun ἀλήθεια, alḗtheia, 'truth'. Aletheia was the personification of truth in Greek philosophy. Alethea was not in use as a name prior to the 1500s. English Puritans used it as a virtue name, though it was also in rare use among aristocratic families who did not practise Puritanism. Alethea Howard, Countess of Arundel was an early bearer of the name.

Variants of the name are also in use. Spelling variants include Aletheia, Alethia, and Aletha. Alethaire or Allethaire is possibly an Older Southern American English variant of Alethea that was in use by some Roman Catholic families in Kentucky by the 1700s. Some etymologists have speculated that Alafair is another American variant that developed from Alethaire.

The name Alethea became more popular in the 1970s due to popular culture influences. The name was among the top 1,000 names used for newborn girls in 1973 and 1974 in the United States, which was the height of its popularity in that country. Increase in usage of the name coincided with a March 1973 guest appearance by 10-year-old child actress Jodie Foster in an episode of the American television series Kung Fu. American writer and editor Alethea Kontis was among the girls named after Alethea Patricia Ingram, the character played by Foster. In the episode, Alethea mistakenly believed she witnessed her new friend, Kwai Chang Caine, commit a murder, made an accusation, and then recanted and told what she believed to be a lie to save him from execution. The character's name was symbolic as her full name means truth while her nickname, Lethe, means the opposite: forgetfulness.

There were 66 American girls named Alethea in 1972, the year before the episode aired, and 322 American girls named Alethea in 1973, the year it aired and the year the name was most used in the United States. Variant spellings Alethia and Aletheia also increased in use in the United States for newborn girls between 1972 and 1973. There were 27 American girls called Alethia in 1972 and 74 girls named Alethia in 1973. Fewer than five American girls were named Aletheia in 1972 and five girls were called Aletheia in 1973. The name declined in usage between 1973 and 1974, with 201 girls named Alethea, 46 girls named Alethia, and seven girls named Aletheia. The name has not been among the 1,000 most popular names for American girls since 1974. However, the name remains in steady, occasional use in the United States.

Although the name has not appeared on popularity charts in other countries, it also remains in occasional use worldwide.

== People named Alethea ==
- Alethea Arnaquq-Baril (born 1978), Inuk Canadian filmmaker
- Alethea Boon (born 1984), New Zealand athlete
- Alethea Charlton (1931–1976), British actress
- Alethea Lincoln Froburg, American politician
- Alethea Garstin (1894–1978), British painter and Royal Academician
- Aletha Gilbert (1870-1931), American policewoman, Los Angeles City Mother, clubwoman
- Alethea Hayter (1911–2006), British author and British Council representative
- Alethea Hill Platt (1860–1932), American artist and educator
- Alethea Howard, Countess of Arundel (1585–1654), née Talbot, wife of Thomas Howard, 21st Earl of Arundel
- Alethea Jones, Australian film and television director
- Alethea Kontis (born 1976), American author and editor
- Alethea Lewis (1749–1827), British novelist
- Aletheia McCaskill (born 1971), American politician and union activist
- Alethea McGrath (1920–2016), Australian actress
- Alethea "Thea" Proctor (1879–1966), Australian painter, printmaker, designer, and teacher
- Alethea Sedgman (born 1994), Australian sport shooter

== Fictional characters ==
- Alethea Patricia Ingram, a character in a 1973 episode of the American television series Kung Fu
- Alethea Hunt, the protagonist of David Ireland's 1979 Miles Franklin Award winning novel, A Woman of the Future

== See also ==
- Aletheia (disambiguation)
- Aleta (disambiguation)
- Althea
- Letha (disambiguation)
