= List of civic mayors of Doncaster =

List of mayors of Doncaster, South Yorkshire, England

Civic Mayor of Doncaster
- Incumbent; Jackie Dudley since May 2026
- Style: His/Her Worship
- Residence: Doncaster Mansion House
- Appointer: City of Doncaster Council
- Term length: 1 Year (Unable to run for a Consecutive Second Term)
- Inaugural holder: Charles Theobald
- Formation: 1900
- Succession: Election by the Council
- Deputy: Deputy Civic Mayor
- Salary: No Salary
- Website: Office of the Civic Mayor

The Civic Mayor of Doncaster is the ceremonial leader of the City of Doncaster Council. The civic mayor is appointed annually from the members of City of Doncaster Council and serves for one municipal year.

== History ==
The first mayor of Doncaster, in 1493, was a Thomas Pigborne. The first mayor of the Borough of Doncaster under the Municipal Corporations Act 1835 was Sir William Bryan Cooke, 8th baronet of Wheatley. One of the later 19th-century mayors was Charles Verity, who served from 1881 to 1882. The role was reconstituted on 1 April 1974 to cover the larger Metropolitan Borough of Doncaster. On 18 May 2018 history was made when Councillor Majid Khan became the first ethnic minority Mayor of Doncaster.

Since May 2002 there has also been a directly elected mayor of Doncaster and in May 2012, voters decided in a referendum to keep the position.

== List of civic mayors (since 1900) ==
Source: Doncaster History

- 1900 Charles Theobald
- 1901 Thomas Windle
- 1902 Robert Robinson
- 1903 John Tinsley Spencer
- 1904 George Smith
- 1905 George Smith
- 1906 Nathan Gyles
- 1907 Enoch Ellis
- 1908 Joseph Firth Clark
- 1909 George Bennett
- 1910 John Halmshaw
- 1911 Charles Wightman
- 1912 William Clark
- 1913 John Thomas Kay
- 1914 Patrick Stirling (engineer/footballer)
- 1915 Samuel Balmforth
- 1916 Samuel Balmforth
- 1917 George Raithby
- 1918 Abner Carr
- 1919 Richard Martin Jackson
- 1920 Frederick William Cocking
- 1921 Samuel Morris
- 1922 George Thomas Tuby
- 1923 Thomas Hedley Oliver
- 1924 William Davy Borrill
- 1925 Edwin Smith Knight
- 1926 Ernest John Dowson

County Borough

- 1927 Herbert Myers Marshall
- 1928 Harry Warren
- 1929 Richard Henry Hepworth
- 1930 Walter James Crookes
- 1931 George Watson
- 1932 Arthur Thomson
- 1933 Thomas Gilberthorpe
- 1934 George Herbert Ranyard
- 1935 Harry Herbert Bone
- 1936 Thomas Henry Johnson
- 1937 Samuel Morris
- 1938 Willie Corbett
- 1939 Herbert Fred Heaviside
- 1940 Ernest Scargall
- 1940 Andrew Clarke
- 1941 Frederick Charles Trotter
- 1942 Charles Herbert Mason
- 1943 Sidney Howe Auckland
- 1944 Walter Firth
- 1945 Frederick Charles Trotter
- 1946 Ernest Shaw
- 1947 Harry Llewellyn Goe
- 1948 Percy Judd
- 1949 Herbert Martin
- 1949 Percy Judd
- 1950 Herbert Wilson
- 1951 Rose Hodson
- 1952 Edgar Hubbard
- 1953 Albert Edward Cammidge
- 1954 Herbert Jackson
- 1955 Alfred Edward Hall
- 1956 Elizabeth Dougal Callander
- 1957 William Chappell
- 1958 Arthur Harvey
- 1959 Fred Ogden
- 1960 Frank Stafford Heptonstall
- 1961 Thomas Henry Wright
- 1962 Reginald Kelsall
- 1963 William Ernest Whittington
- 1964 Stanley Claude Holbrook
- 1965 H. Culshaw
- 1966 George Francis Hardy
- 1967 Elsie Stenson
- 1968 William Hubert Kelly
- 1969 Marcus S. Outwin
- 1970 Olive Sunderland
- 1971 William Clarke
- 1972 Edith Plumb
- 1973 Arthur Heaven

Metropolitan Borough

- 1974 – 1975 Albert Edward Cammidge
- 1975 – 1976 Gerald Messines McDade
- 1976 – 1977 Gordon Gallimore
- 1977 – 1978 Robert Vernon Carr Grainger
- 1978 – 1979 Winifred M. Liversidge
- 1979 – 1980 George Cheshire
- 1980 – 1981 John Edward Oliver
- 1981 – 1982 Alexander Grimson
- 1982 – 1983 Harry Schofield
- 1983 – 1984 Catherine Bower
- 1984 – 1985 Norma Wilson
- 1985 – 1986 Lionel Norten Hall
- 1986 – 1987 Edward Gardner
- 1987 – 1988 Gladys Ambler
- 1988 – 1989 Ronald Wilfred Gillies
- 1989 – 1990 Raymond Stockhill
- 1990 – 1991 John Meredith
- 1991 – 1992 William R. Gillies
- 1992 – 1993 Charles W. Verrill
- 1993 – 1994 John Quinn
- 1994 – 1995 Gordon Gallimore
- 1995 – 1996 Andy Lanaghan
- 1996 – 1997 Dorothy Layton
- 1997 – 1998 Sheila Mitchinson
- 1998 – 1999 Margaret Robinson
- 1999 – 2000 Yvonne Woodcock
- 2000 – 2001 Maureen Edgar
- 2001 – 2002 Beryl Roberts
- 2002 – 2003 John R. Quinn
- 2003 – 2004 G. M. (Mick) Jameson
- 2004 – 2005 Margaret Ward
- 2005 – 2006 Susan Bolton
- 2006 – 2007 Norah Troops
- 2007 – 2008 Anthony Sockett
- 2008 – 2009 Paul Coddington
- 2009 – 2010 Ros Jones
- 2010 Margaret Pinkney (resigned due to ill health)
- 2010 – 2011 Ken Knight
- 2011 – 2012 Eva Hughes
- 2012 – 2013 Christine Mills
- 2013 – 2014 Eddie Dobbs
- 2014 – 2015 Pat Haith
- 2015 – 2016 Paul Wray
- 2016 – 2017 David Nevett
- 2017 – 2018 Leslie George Derx
- 2018 – 2019 Majid Khan
- 2019 – 2021 Linda Curran
- 2021 – 2022 Richard Allan Jones
- 2022 – 2023 Ian Pearson
- 2023 – 2024 Duncan Anderson.
- 2024 – 2025 Julie Grace
- 2025 – 2026 Tim Needham
- 2026 – 2027 Jackie Dudley
