= Alafair =

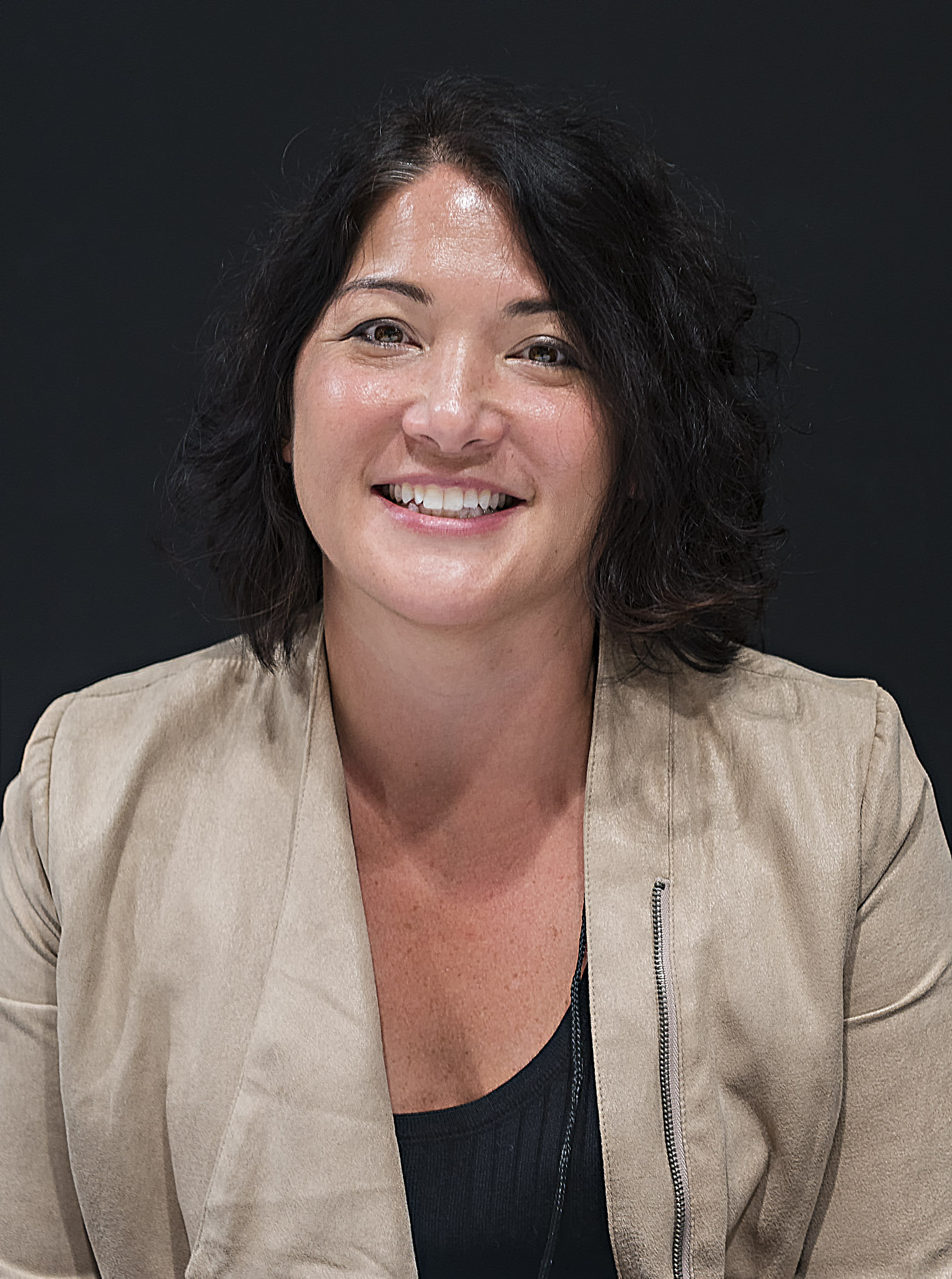
- American crime novelist Alafair Burke (born 1969) was named after her great-grandmother.
- Gender: Feminine
- Language: English

Origin
- Meaning: Uncertain derivation

Alafair is a rare English feminine given name of uncertain derivation. It has been in use in the Anglosphere since the 1700s. Initial use of the name might have been among British Romanichal families. In the United States, the name was most used in the American South. Some etymologists have speculated that Alafair might have evolved from the name Alethea via Alethaire or Allethaire, a possible Older Southern American English variant of Alethea that was in use by the 1700s. Others have proposed that Alafair might be derived from a corruption of Alfred, Alice, Elvira, or Oliver. Numerous spellings of the name are recorded in United States census records including Alafaire, Alafare, Alefare, Alifair, Allifair, Allifare, Elafaire, Elafare, Elifair, Ellafair, and Ellafare.

== Women ==
- Alafair Burke (born 1969), American crime novelist, professor of law, and legal commentator
- Alifair McCoy (1858-1888), American victim of the ongoing feud between the Hatfields and McCoys from 1863 to 1891

== Fiction ==
- Alafair Robicheaux, a character in the Dave Robicheaux series of mystery novels by American crime novelist James Lee Burke
- Alifair McCoy, a character in the 2012 American television miniseries Hatfields & McCoys
