= Patrick Stirling (footballer) =

Scottish footballer

Personal information
- Date of birth: 5 November 1862
- Place of birth: Kilmarnock, Scotland
- Date of death: 1925 (aged 63)
- Place of death: Doncaster, England

Senior career*
Years	Team	Apps	(Gls)
1885−????	Doncaster Rovers		
- *Club domestic league appearances and goals

Patrick Stirling (5 November 1862 − 1925) was a Scottish footballer who played for Doncaster Rovers and was Mayor of Doncaster. His father, also called Patrick Stirling, was Locomotive Superintendent of the Great Northern Railway and designer of the 4-2-2 steam locomotive Stirling single that set speed records during the race to the north.

Stirling was born in Kilmarnock in 1862 to parents Patrick and Margaret, and had two elder brothers, Robert and Matthew. With his father entering the employ of the GNR, the family moved to Doncaster, Yorkshire where his sister Jane and brother James were born.

At the age of 18, he was employed as an engine fitter at Great Northern Railway's Doncaster Works and by 1885−86 he was playing for Doncaster Rovers in their early days as a football club.

Stirling gave a lifetime of public service to the town, becoming Mayor of Doncaster in 1914.

On 29 April 1891 he was married to Sarah Ann Roberts, and died in Doncaster in 1925 aged 63.
