= Alethaire =

Alethaire or Allethaire is a feminine given name of uncertain meaning that has been in use in the American South since the 1700s. It might have evolved from the name Alethea or be related to the name Alafair.

== Women named Alethaire ==
- Mary Alethaire Simms (1898–1917), a victim of the 1917 Shepherdsville train wreck in Shepherdsville, Kentucky

== Women named Allethaire ==
- Allethaire Chase Ludlow Rotan (1880–1977), American socialite, ex-wife of William M. Cummer, widow of George W. Elkins and Samuel Pennington Rotan, one-time owner of Myrtle Grove Plantation, Georgia
