= Charles Verity =

19th-century English mayor

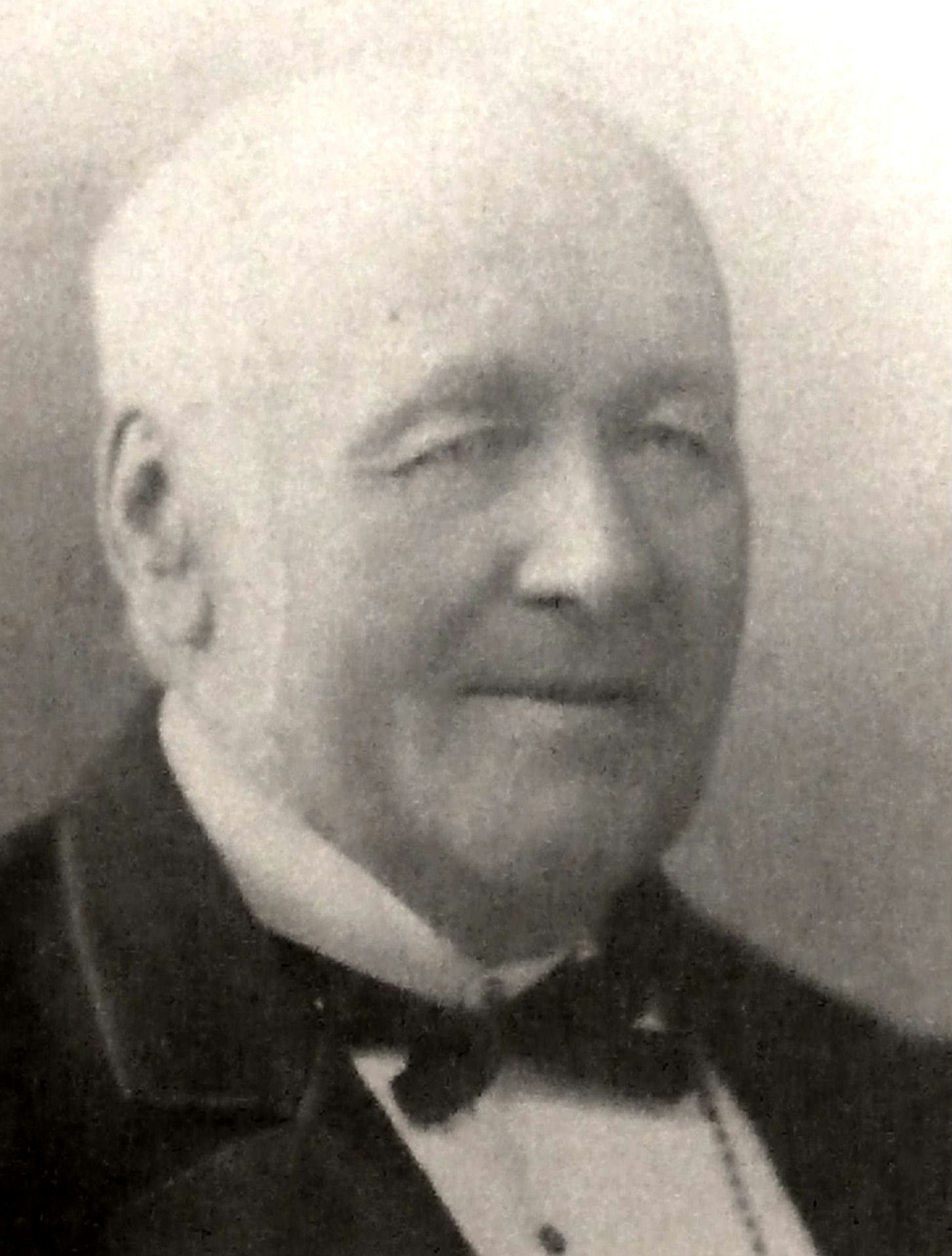
- Born: 27 August 1814; Lefare Gap, Wakefield, West Riding of Yorkshire, England
- Died: 4 December 1899 (aged 85); Doncaster, England
- Occupations: Stone mason, Railway ganger, bullding contractor and Mayor of Doncaster
- Years active: 1835–1890
- Notable work: Construction of bridges connecting the Conisborough tunnel, England
- Relatives: Fred Verity; Claude Hamilton Verity

Signature
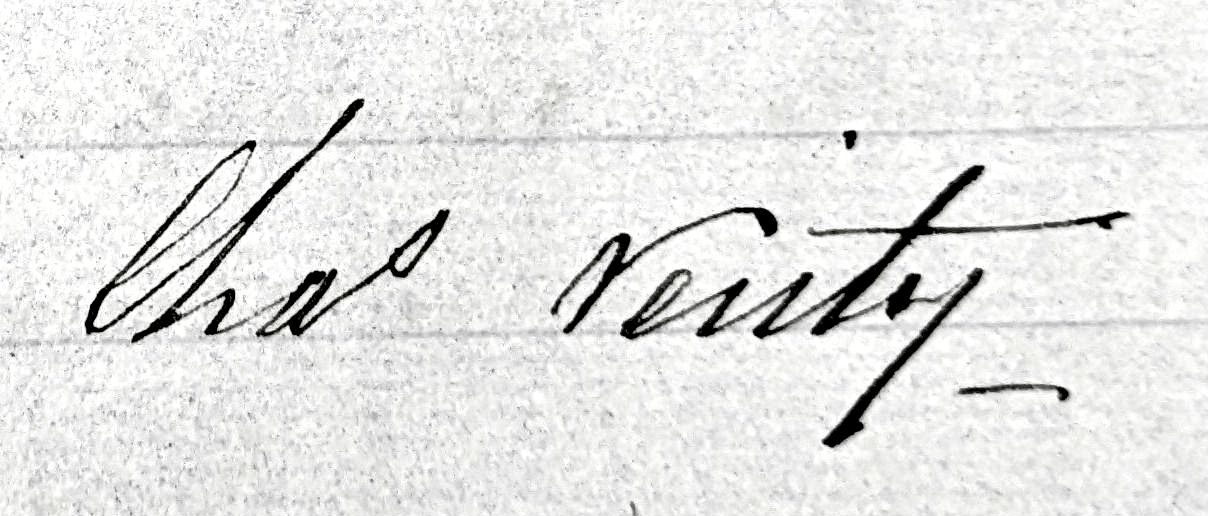

Charles Verity (27 August 1814 – 4 December 1899) was an English stone mason, building contractor and mayor of Doncaster. He began his career as an itinerant railway ganger but, after his ability was noticed by railway engineer Charles Bartholomew, he received building contracts, including the Frodingham Viaduct, which started him on the road to a successful career as a building contractor. He became a wealthy man and was elected mayor of Doncaster in 1881. He sired a large family, and two of his descendants were Charles Henry Verity owner of the Swinton Wagon and Railway Wheel works, and "principal in the firm of Verity & Son, wheel, tire, (sic) and axle manufacturers at Swinton", and the inventor Claude Hamilton Verity.

== Background ==
Charles Verity was born in the Wakefield area to a family of stone masons, but he ultimately settled in Doncaster. His grandfather was John Verity senior, a stone mason of Upper Green, near Woodkirk, Leeds. Verity's father was builder and stone mason John Verity junior. In 1841, he was living with his wife and two of his children in Lake Lock, Stanley, Wakefield. He died in Goole in the East Riding of Yorkshire. (Note: John Verity (8 November 1785 – 6 December 1847). . GRO index: Deaths Dec 1847 Verity John Goole 23 168.) At the time of his death, John Verity junior had been the clerk of works for Aire and Calder Navigation for twenty-two years. Charles Verity's mother was Elizabeth Verity née Hey. (Note: Elizabeth Verity née Hey (1785–1862). GRO index: Deaths Mar 1862 Verity Elizabeth Wakefield 9c 13.) Charles Verity was born in 1814 in Lefare Gap, (Note: Charles Verity (27 August 1814 – 4 December 1899). GRO index: Deaths Dec 1899 Verity Charles 85 Doncaster 9c 495.) between Wakefield and Morley, West Riding of Yorkshire. or possibly in West Ardsley.

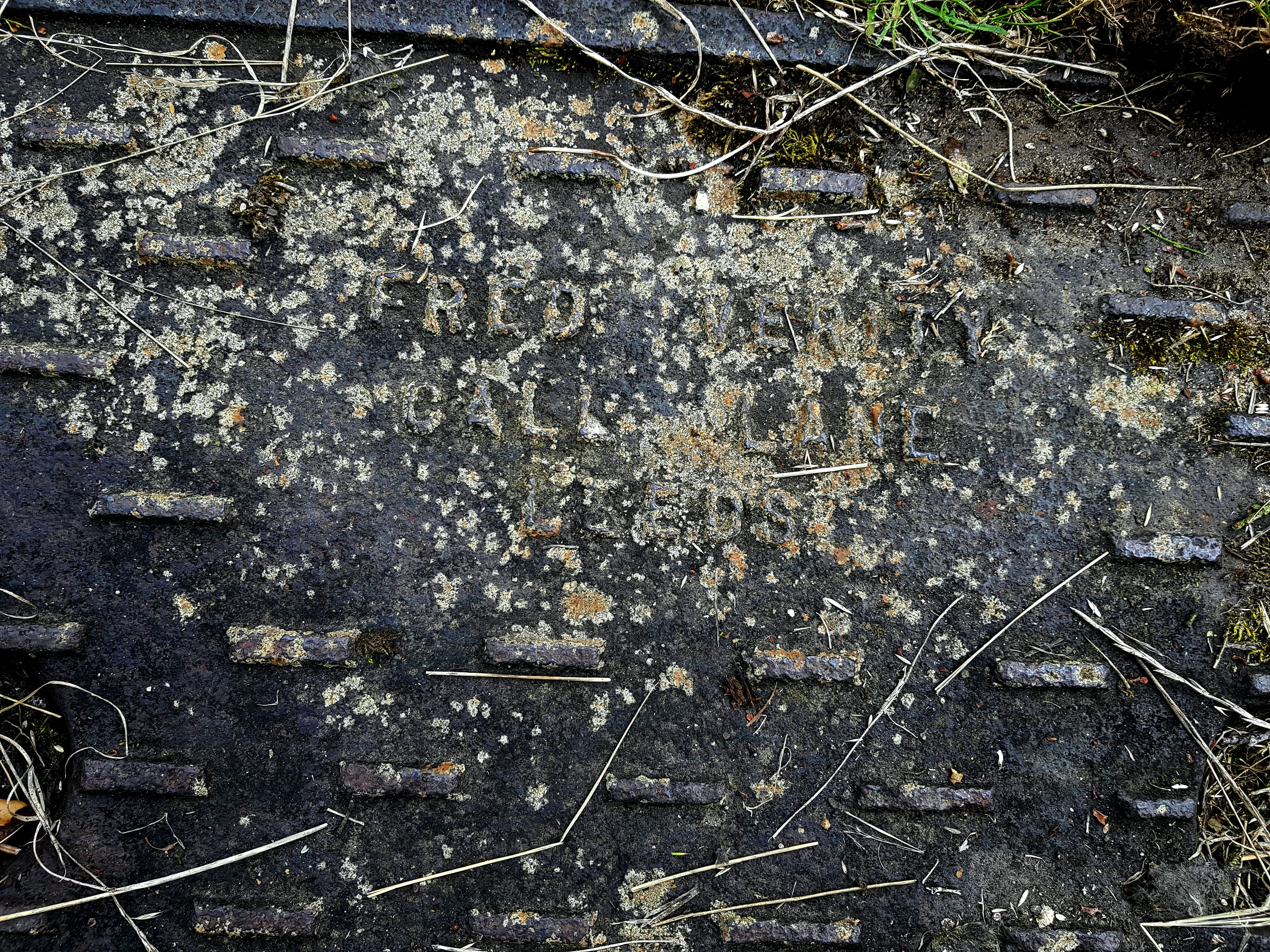
Manhole cover, by Fred Verity, son of Verity. (Note: Joshua Marland "Fred" Verity (1847–1897), son of Charles Verity, had a manufacturing and retail ironmongery business in Call Lane, Leeds, North Yorkshire, in the late 19th century.)

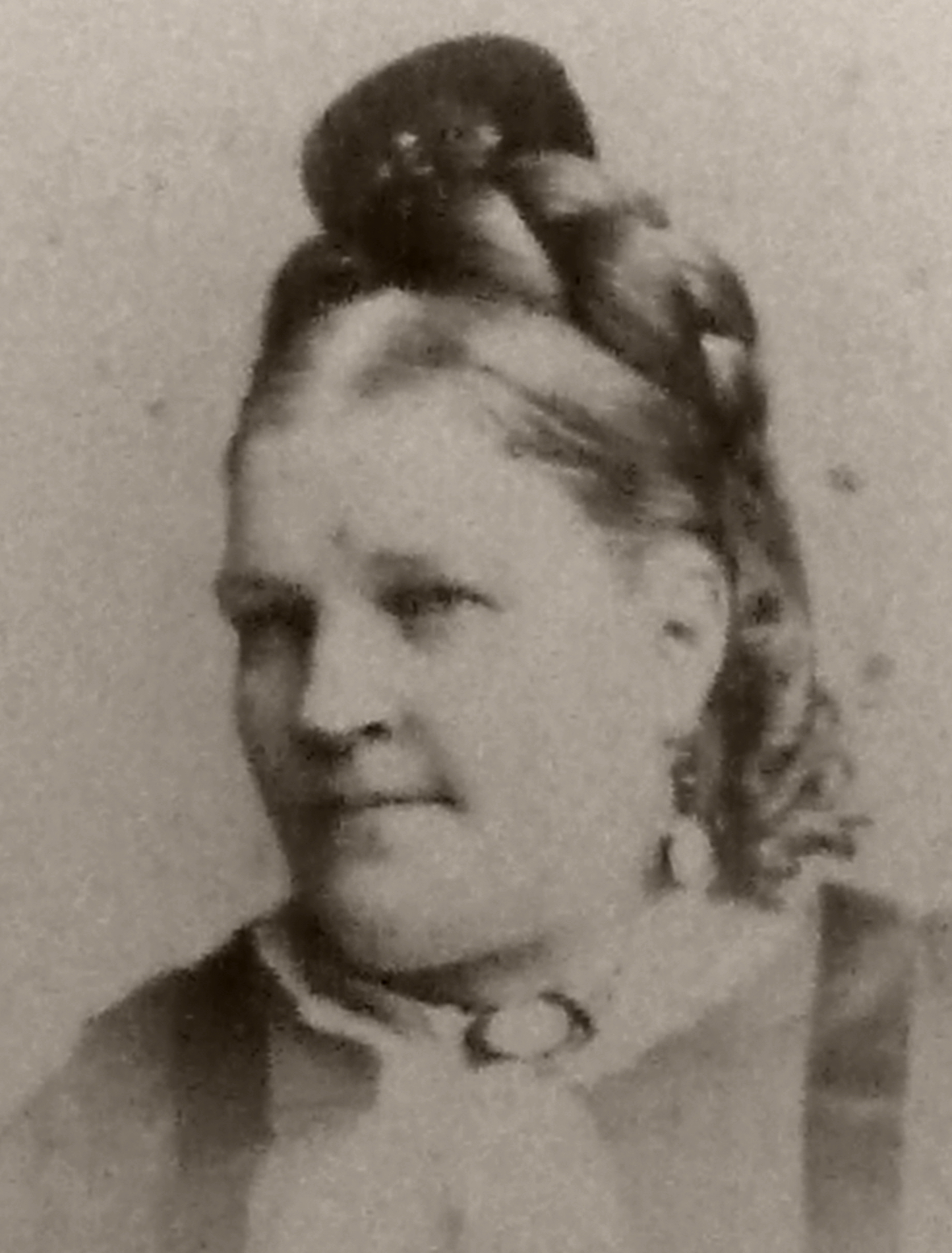
Jane Harriet Verity

Verity's first wife was Harriet Marland, daughter of bookkeeper Joshua Marland. (Note: Harriet Verity née Marland (1815–1847). GRO index: Marriages 20 August 1838 at All Saints, Wakefield. Marland Harriet and Verity Charles. Wakefield 22 463. Deaths Jun 1847 Verity Harriet Wakefield 22 507.) She died in 1847, in the year when her fourth child was born. In 1841, the census finds Verity and his first wife and eldest child John living in Lake Lock, Stanley, Wakefield, near the former Lake Lock Rail Road. Verity's second son with his first wife was Charles Henry Verity, (Note: Charles Henry Verity (1841 – 20 February 1899). GRO index: Births Sep 1841 Verity Charles Henry Wakefield XXII 638. Deaths Mar 1899 Verity Charles Henry 57 Bridlington 9d 218.) who, according to the South Yorkshire Times and Mexborough and Swinton Times completed his apprenticeship as an engineer at Manchester. He joined his father in railway and viaduct construction, then constructed the wagon building and repairing sheds in White Lee Road, Mexborough, purchased land, and built the wheel works. For over thirty years, he was the "owner of the Swinton Wagon and Railway Wheel works" according to the Sheffield Independent, and "principal in the firm of Verity & Son, wheel, tire (sic), and axle manufacturers at Swinton" as reported by the Bridlington and Quay Gazette. Verity's grandson, via his son, ironmonger Edwin Verity, (Note: Edwin Verity (Stanley, West Riding of Yorkshire 1845 – 11 March 1909). GRO index: Deaths Mar 1909 Verity Edwin 54 Leeds 9b 421) was the inventor Claude Hamilton Verity. (Note: Claude Hamilton Verity (1880–1949). GRO index: Births Jun 1880 Verity Claud Hamilton Leeds 9b 627. Deaths Sep 1949 Verity Claud H. 69 Newton A. 7a 441. Note: He was named "Claud" on birth and death certificates, but "Claude" on his marriage certificate.) One of Verity's sons was a solicitor practising in Doncaster, but he died young.

Verity married his second wife Jane Harriet Greaves on 5 April 1849, (Note: Jane Harriet Verity née Greaves (Kellington 1822 – 16 September 1876). GRO index: Marriages Jun 1849 Greaves Jane and Verity Charles. Doncaster XXII 63. Deaths Sep 1876 Verity Jane Harriett 54 Doncaster 9c 407.) and had at least eight children with her, but she died in 1876. In 1851, Verity, his second wife, and three of their sons were living at New Bridge, Swinton. His children were scholars, and he described himself as a builder employing 300 men. Charles Verity arrived in Doncaster around 1855; probably by 1853, when his daughter Agnes Jane was born there. By 1861, Verity and his family were living at 62 Cemetery Road, Doncaster, with six of their children, who had all been born in Swinton, and Verity was describing himself as a builder and contractor. The 1871 Census finds Verity and his wife Jane living in Doncaster with six of their children, five of them being Doncaster-born.

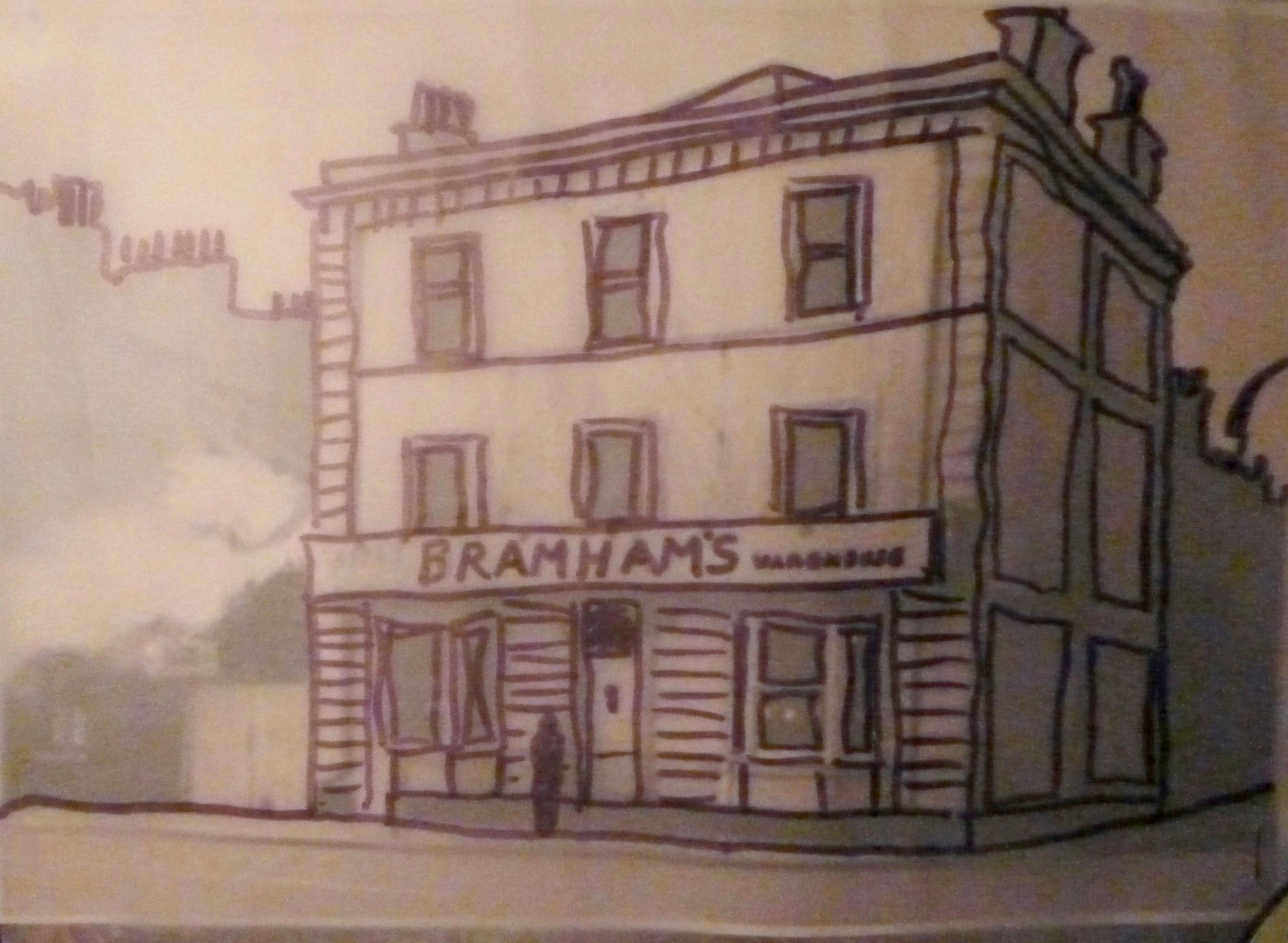
Waterdale House, Doncaster

By 1881, Verity was a retired contractor and widower, living in Waterdale House, 27 Horse Fair, Doncaster, with two of his unmarried daughters Agnes Jane and Rosabella, and two servants. In 1891 the census finds Verity still at the same house, now called 27 Waterdale, with just two servants, because his daughters Agnes Jane and Rosabella, who had previously lived with him, were each now married. (Note: 27 Waterdale is apparently now the site of a new building: Doncaster Central Library.) Although Verity married twice and had at least twelve children, (Note: Verity's first four children by Harriet née Marland were: John Verity (1839–1857), Charles Henry Verity (1841–1899), Edwin Verity (1844–1909), and Joshua Marland "Fred" Verity (1847–1897). His children by Jane Harriet née Greaves were: William Verity (1850 – Port Said 2 January 1883), Elizabeth Ann Waddington née Verity (born 1851), Agnes Jane Driver née Verity (1853–1901), Thomas Samuel Verity (1855–1887). John Greaves Verity (1858–1889), Frances Louisa Lett née Verity (1859–1890), Sarah Ann Verity (born 1860), Rosabell Catherine Cartmel née Verity (born 1860) (GRO index: Births Sep 1860 Verity Rosabella Catherine Doncaster 9c 454) and Isabella Verity (1861–1902).) when he died at Waterdale House on 4 December 1899, he had outlived both wives and most of his children, except for his third son Edwin and three married daughters. Verity was buried in plot D333 of Hyde Park Cemetery (formerly Doncaster Cemetery), alongside his second wife and other relatives, on 8 December 1899. He left £17,742 15s 1d (equivalent to £1,971,226.11 in 2025).

== Career ==
Verity began his working life as a railway ganger, or leader of a gang of railway labourers. He was "a man of comparatively little education" who recalled "the days when he went from town to town in search of work, with his tools on his back, [and] the humble meals he was wont to eat under the shelter of the friendly hedge".

=== South Yorkshire Railway ===
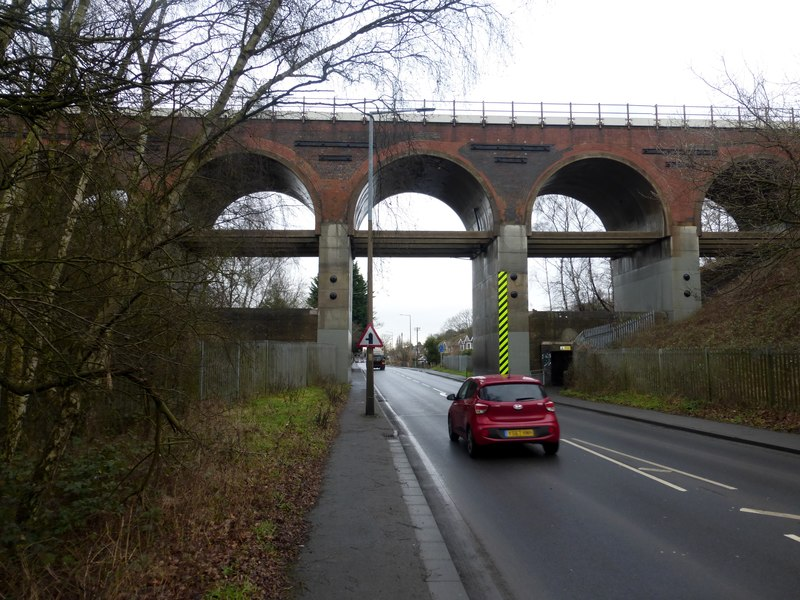
Frodingham Viaduct, in 2018

Verity arrived in Doncaster in the early 1850s, during the construction of the South Yorkshire Railway, and "took several contracts", which forwarded his career. As a ganger he became friendly with the wealthy civil engineer Charles Bartholomew of Rotherham, (Note: Charles Bartholomew (1806–1895) of Rotheram. GRO index: Deaths Mar 1895 Bartholomew Charles 88 Brentford 3a 73) who was engineer in chief of River Don Navigation and South Yorkshire Railway company, and was "not slow to recognise [Verity's] abilities". Bartholomew gave him a contract "for the construction of the bridges over the Navigation at either end of the Conisbrough tunnel". Verity was then subcontracted for "the part of the line between Aldham Junction and Barnsley", which was a four-mile stretch. Verity had another contract "for the construction of the viaduct between Gunness and Frodingham", now known as the Scotter Road railway viaduct, built in 1864. This brought him wealth, and was "far and away the most important contract he ever had". By 1851, he was employing three hundred men. Verity rose to be a wealthy contractor, building bridges and houses.

=== Other contracts ===
After the completion of the South Yorkshire Railway, Verity contracted for smaller operations, the major one being "the construction of a portion of the Doncaster Corporation sewage works". In 1847, a few months after his first wife's death, and after Verity had contracted to build the Church of England Day School at Alverthorpe, Wakefield, the foundation stone was laid by George Sandars M.P. of Alverthorpe Hall on 7 October of that year, before a large crowd. Following the ceremony, the grander guests were treated to a dinner at Alverthorpe Hall, and in the evening Verity hosted his workmen to "a most excellent dinner, to which they did ample justice", at his house. Around 1854, for Mappin & Co. of Rotherham, he built the Thatched House Inn, at St Sepulchre Gate, Doncaster, and he lived there briefly, renting it from Mappin & Co. Shortly after that, he built Burns Tavern, Cemetery Road, Doncaster, together with three adjoining cottages. He lived for a while in one of those cottages, then went to live in the Waterdale area of Doncaster, for the rest of his life. He built six houses in Prospect Place, Doncaster, as a personal investment. In 1859, and before a group of shareholders, the groundwork began on West Melton waterworks, Verity having rented the land with the intention of completing the project.

In 1864, Verity was one of the contractors for the Trent, Ancholme and Grimsby Railway. For some years until 1867, he was in partnership with Alpheus Smith of Derby, in the firm, The Midland and Yorkshire Coal and Waggon Company, "contractor[s] in the trades or businesses of dealers in coal and coke, dealers in pig iron and iron ore, and in the building, purchasing, hiring, and holding for sale, letting on hire, and use of railway waggons and trucks ... carried on in Derby". By the time he died, he had accumulated a number of properties for himself. He retired from business, and concentrated on serving Doncaster Corporation as a councillor.

== Public service ==
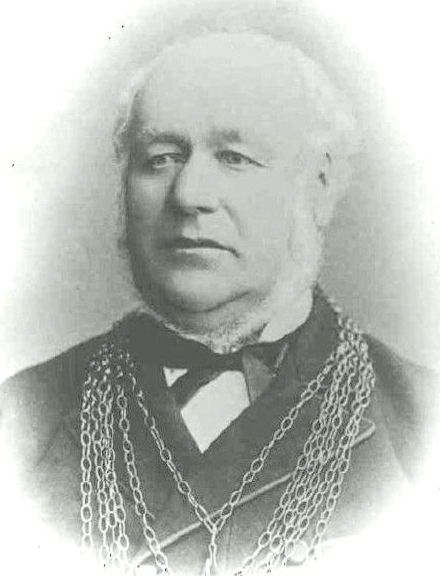
Verity as mayor of Doncaster, 1881–1882

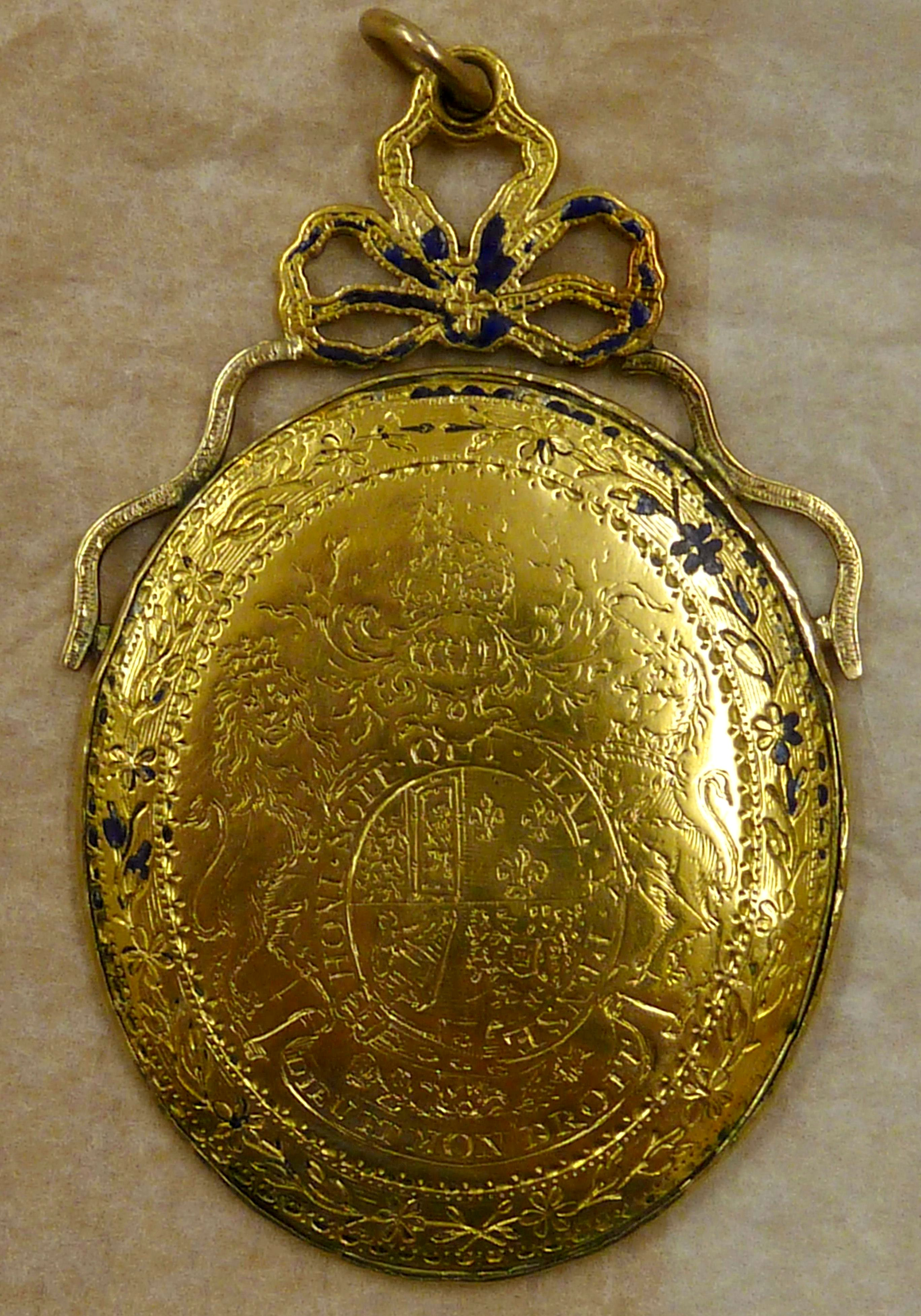
The 18th-century mayoral medal worn by the mayors of Verity's era

Verity became a councillor for Doncaster Corporation in 1863. In 1866, when a fellow town councillor was threatened, Verity made a gesture:

At the Doncaster Borough Police Court ... Mr Cotnam Townsend, one of the town councillors of Doncaster (who was charged at the last Leeds assizes for alleged perjury and obtaining money by false pretences) summoned Mr Joseph Needham, auctioneer, for threatening to horsewhip him on Friday last ... As the offence had been admitted [it was judged that] the defendant must enter into his own recognizances of £20 (equivalent to £2,058.28 in 2025), and find a responsible surety in like amount, to keep the peace ... Mr Charles Verity, a member of the town council, gave the required surety.

Later, in 1874, Verity stood as prospective councillor in Doncaster West Ward, in opposition to the existing West Ward councillor Cotnam Townsend in the municipal election. Verity won, and Townsend retired.

Verity was elected mayor of Doncaster in November 1881, and held office until November 1882. His election was unanimous, and included the position of chief magistrate of the borough. On the occasion of Verity's election, both the mover and the seconder to the proposal "spoke of Mr Verity as being well-fitted for the post, in consequence of his thorough practical knowledge and his straightforward speaking during discussions". Having agreed to the post, Verity "craved the assistance of the gentlemen around him to help him". In 1882 he became an alderman of the corporation. For many years, Verity served the corporation, retiring in 1890, or 1893.

=== Personality ===
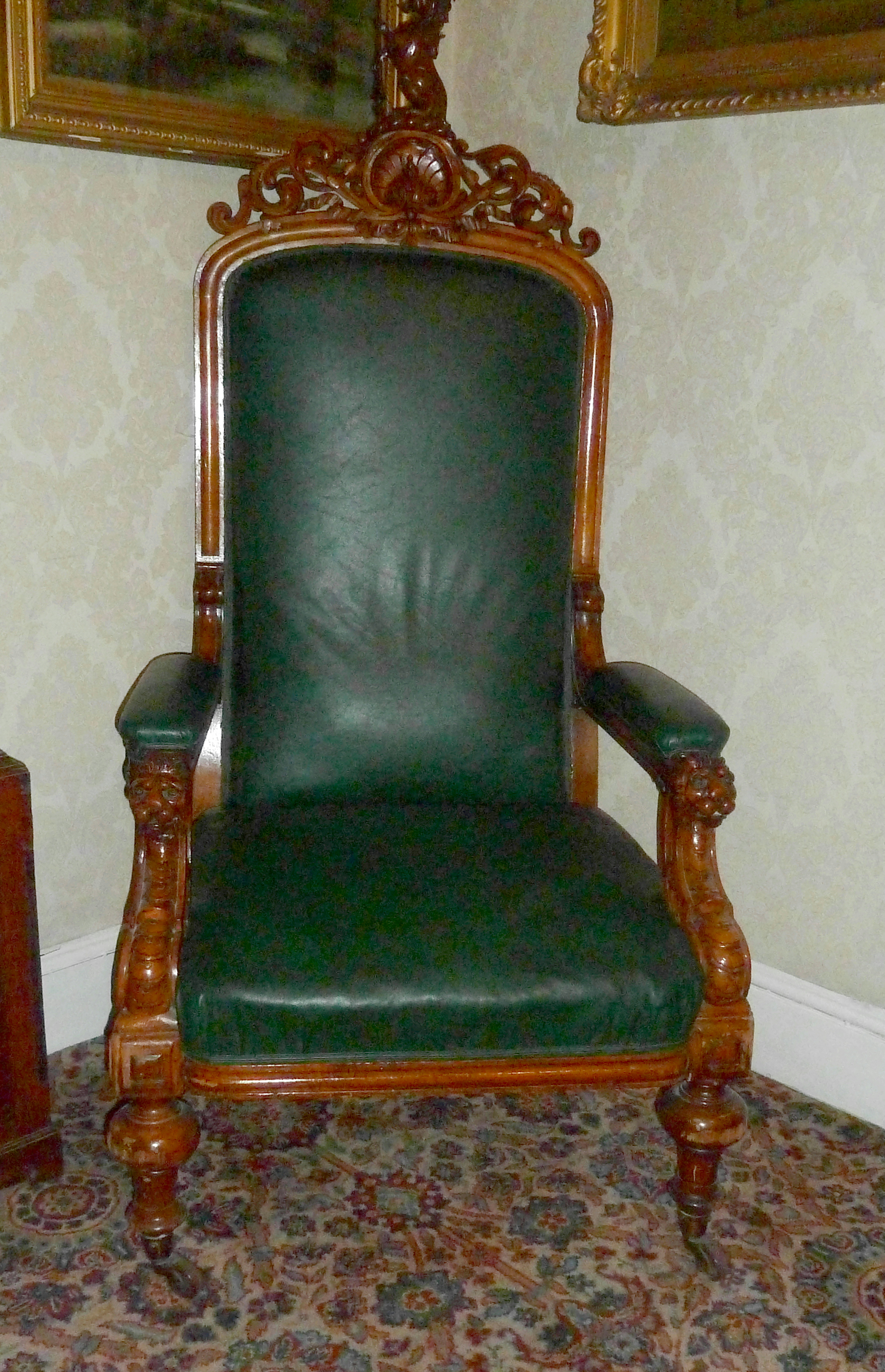
The mayoral chair which received Verity more suddenly than expected

While serving the Corporation, Verity was noted for his personality. The South Yorkshire Times reported that "Verity was always a genial man, ready to laugh with any, even at his own little mistakes". For example, following his election as mayor: "After he had been invested with the chain of office he found the seat rather quicker than he expected, and fell back into it in a not very dignified way. This created a laugh, in which the Mayor heartily joined, but on settling down remarked that after all it was very comfortable!" He was a "useful member of the Corporation in his way", and had strong opinions about the work of the council's accountant. In spite of his meagre education, he "had business capacity", and was "a straightforward, independent man, who did not always care whether his words offended or pleased, but whose general disposition was genial in the extreme".

The same newspaper gives some examples of Verity's behaviour. It had been a tradition for Doncaster mayors always to invite the same people to mayoral banquets, but Verity would drastically prune and add to those guest lists. When one rejected long-term guest queried his exclusion, he was told: "It's time somebody else had a turn". On another occasion, one of the invited guests to his mayoral ball asked for a second invitation for a friend, but Verity replied, "I've plenty of friends of my own". His political behaviour followed the same pattern. He supported the "old and predominant party" of the Corporation, and when new parties were formed, his comment was always, "Here's another on 'em". That phrase continued to be imitated and repeated by other Corporation members, even after his death.

Verity "was always a careful man, but he loved good company" and during his mayoralty he was "frequently" in public houses. Late one evening, his speech "displeased the landlady, and she left the bar". His friends told him to apologise, and the landlady was brought back. Verity wanted to know what he said that was so offensive. His friends promptly reminded him, and his reply was, "Then, I'll stick to it". He was still mayor when a local curate entered the mayoral parlour to ask for a contribution for some ecclesiastical purpose. Verity offered a small amount, but when the cleric queried the size of it, he put his money back in his pocket, saying, "All right, if you don't think it's big enough, I can put it in my pocket again". However, the newspaper which reported these anecdotes appended a comment:

But perhaps the most striking trait in Mr Verity's character, next to his geniality, was his absolute naturalness. He had not the slightest bit of affectation about him. He was always Charles Verity, never anybody else. and wealth in his case brought none of that pride which induces some who have risen in the world from small beginnings to throw a cloak over their early life. Mr Verity was a mason by trade, and he was rather proud than ashamed of his humble origin. He liked occasionally to call to mind his early struggles.
