= Letha =

Letha may refer to:

- Letha (character) (Hellen Feliciano), a supervillain in the Marvel Comics Universe
- Letha, Idaho, an unincorporated town in Gem County, Idaho, United States
- Letha Dawson Scanzoni (born 1935), independent scholar, author, and editor
- Letha Wilson (born 1976), American artist
- Letha Raney Intermediate School, a middle school in Corona, California

== See also ==
- Austroassiminea letha, a species of minute salt marsh snail
- Thecla letha, a small butterfly found in India
