= Aletheia M. D. =

Aletheia, M. D. is a pseudonym for the anonymous author of the Rationalist's Manual published London : Watts & Co., 1897. Part I. - Theology : Its Superstitions and Origin. Part II. — Rationalism : Its Philosophy and Ethics.

It was reviewed in The Literary World which considered that "this work may be described as the reduction of human life to its lowest possible terms. Anything that suggests other than animal and material considerations as a basis of conduct is to "Aletheia, MD," anathema-maranatha. Religion is to be judged not by its ideals, but by its origins." In 1967 it was again mentioned in Ethics but as "sadly marred by Biblical criticism of a rather old-fashioned type."
