= Claudius Marius Victorius =

Gallic rhetorician and poet from Marseille of the fifth century CE

Claudius Marius Victorius (or Victorinus or Victor) was a rhetor (i.e. a teacher and poet) of the fifth century CE from Marseille. He is known for a Latin poem on Genesis in hexameters and a letter to the abbot Salomon against the moral degradation of his age.

== Biography ==
Evidence for Claudius's life comes from Gennadius of Massilia. He was born in the second half of the fourth century and died during the reign of Theodosius the Younger and Valentinian III, around 446.

== Works ==
Gennadius of Massilia assigns a poem on Genesis, the Aletheia (i.e. Ancient Greek ἀλήθεια, 'truth'), to Claudius Marius Victor, orator Massiliensis ('an orator from Marseille'). This 1020-line hexametrical poem, intended for the instruction of the young, survives in one ninth-century manuscript and dates from the first or second quarter of the fifth century CE. It contains a prayer and three books which retell Genesis, from the creation of the world to the ruin of Sodom. The author was inspired by Lucretius, Virgil and Ovid and transposes Christian content into a Classical literary form, the epic.

Victorius's other known work is a letter to the abbot Salomon. Here he argues that if the Sarmatians, from Central Asia, have devastated the country, if the Vandals, a Germanic people, have burned it, and if the Alans, who were Sarmatian, have completed that destructions, it is because men have committed errors, and it is sexuality which he blames.

== Significance ==
Gennadius's view of Victorius was not flattering:

Victorinus, a rhetorician of Marseilles, wrote to his son Etherius, a commentary On Genesis, commenting, that is, from the beginning of the book to the death of the patriarch Abraham, and published four books in verse, words which have a savour of piety indeed, but, in that he was a man busied with secular literature and quite untrained in the Divine Scriptures, they are of slight weight, so far as ideas are concerned.

However, Victorius's work fits into the tradition of Christian writers of the first centuries CE, such as Juvencus, Sedulius, Arator, Cyprianus Gallus, and Avitus. Indeed, the transposition of the divine word and/or the celebration of the deeds of saints thrives in the Classical epic form.

His letter has historical interest, particularly for alluding once or twice to the tribes of Gaul and the barbarians. It also mentions the Alans (III, V 192) and Leuques (III, V. 207–209).

== Editions and translations ==
- Commodiani 'Carmina', ed. by Joseph Martin, and Claudii Marii Victorii 'Alethia', ed. by P. F. Hovingh, Corpus Christianorum, Series Latina, 128 (Turnhout: Brepols, 1960), pp. 115–93 (Alethia), and 269–297.
- O. J. Kuhnmuench, Early Christian Latin Poets (Chicago, 1929), pp. 333–46 https://catalog.hathitrust.org/Record/001058147 (excerpts from the Alethia in Latin and English translation.
- Daniel H. Abosso, 'A Translation and Commentary on Claudius Marius Victor's Alethia, 3.1-326' (unpublished Ph.D. dissertation, University of Illinois at Urbana-Champaign, 2015).
