= Fred Verity =

English engineer (1847–1897)

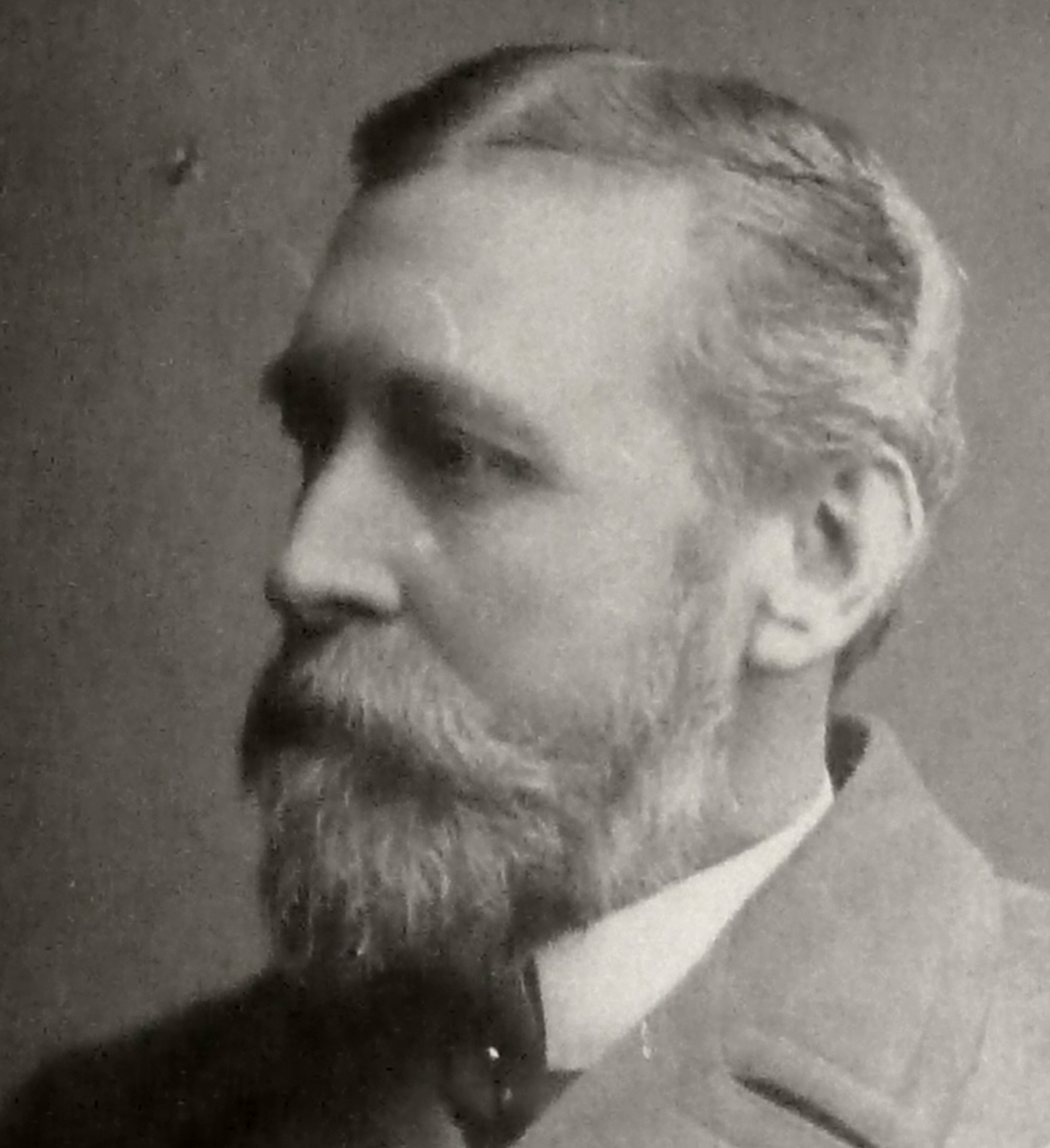
- Verity, in the 1890s
- Born: Joshua Marland Verity; 11 April 1847; Wakefield, West Yorkshire, England
- Died: 5 February 1897 (aged 49); Leeds, West Yorkshire, England
- Occupations: Engineer; iron founder; brass-founder; inventor; manufacturer; ironmonger
- Known for: Manufacture of cast iron manhole covers, kitchen ranges and other ironmongery
- Father: Charles Verity

Joshua Marland "Fred" Verity (11 April 1847 – 5 February 1897) was an English engineer, inventor, iron founder, brass-founder, manufacturer and retailer of ironmongery in Leeds, West Yorkshire, England. With his brother Edwin, and later with his sons, he ran foundries, a workshop in Hunslet, and a large store in Leeds city centre, under the name of Verity Brothers, then Fred Verity & Sons. With Edwin he registered patents for new or improved fittings and gadgets, and produced and sold cast iron products of his era, such as kitchen ranges, manhole covers, fireplaces, lawn mowers and rollers, baths, mangles and other household goods, besides brass fittings. The Verity Brothers won medals at exhibitions for the design of some of their products.

== Background ==
Verity's parents were the stone mason and contractor Charles Verity, mayor of Doncaster, South Yorkshire, and his first wife Harriet Marland, daughter of bookkeeper Joshua Marland. (Note: Harriet Verity née Marland (1815–1847). GRO index: Marriages 20 August 1838 at All Saints, Wakefield. Marland Harriet and Verity Charles. Wakefield 22 463. Deaths Jun 1847 Verity Harriet Wakefield 22 507. Harriet Verity's death certificate says: Died eighth May 1847 at Lake Lock. Harriet Verity, aged 33 years, wife of Charles Verity, stonemason. Cause of death, debility after childbirth, not certified. Present at the death, Martha Teal, Lake Lock.) In 1841, the census finds Charles Verity and his first wife and Fred Verity's eldest brother John living in Lake Lock, Stanley, Wakefield, near the former Lake Lock Rail Road.

Fred Verity's second eldest brother was Charles Henry Verity, (Note: Charles Henry Verity (1841 – 20 February 1899). GRO index: Births Sep 1841 Verity Charles Henry Wakefield XXII 638. Deaths Mar 1899 Verity Charles Henry 57 Bridlington 9d 218.) who, according to the South Yorkshire Times and Mexborough and Swinton Times, completed his apprenticeship as an engineer at Manchester. He joined his father in railway and viaduct construction, then constructed the wagon building and repairing sheds in White Lee Road, Mexborough, purchased land, and built the wheel works. For over thirty years, he was "owner of the Swinton Wagon and Railway Wheel works" according to the Sheffield Independent, and "principal in the firm of Verity & Son, wheel, tire (sic), and axle manufacturers at Swinton" as reported by the Bridlington and Quay Gazette. One of Verity's half brothers was a solicitor practising in Doncaster, but he died young.

Harriet Verity died on 8 May 1847, less than a month after her fourth child, Joshua Marland, known as "Fred" was born. Verity was born in Wakefield on 11 April 1847, and baptised on 11 May 1847 at Lake Lock, York. (Note: Joshua Marland "Fred" Verity (11 April 1847 – 9 February 1897). GRO index: Births Jun 1847 Verity Joshua Marland. Stanley, Wakefield XXII 682. Deaths Mar 1897 Verity Joshua Marland 49. Leeds 9b 384. The death certificate says: Died fifth February 1897 at 180 Chapeltown Road, Potternewton. Joshua Marland Verity, aged 49 years, ironmonger. Cause of death cirrhosis of the liver, exhaustion, certified. Present at the death, E.A. Verity, son, in attendance. Verity married Mary Heptinstall in Kirk Bramwith, 12 June 1872. He was buried at Lawnswood Cemetery, Leeds) His father Charles Verity remarried and had more children after Fred Verity's mother Harriet died, so that Fred Verity was one of twelve siblings: four full siblings and eight half-siblings. (Note: Charles Verity's first four children by Harriet née Marland were: John Verity (1839–1857), Charles Henry Verity (1841–1899), Edwin Verity (1844–1909), and Joshua Marland "Fred" Verity (1847–1897). His children by Jane Harriet née Greaves were: William Verity (1850 – Port Said 2 January 1883), Elizabeth Ann Waddington née Verity (born 1851), Agnes Jane Driver née Verity (1853–1901), Thomas Samuel Verity (1855–1887). John Greaves Verity (1858–1889), Frances Louisa Lett née Verity (1859–1890), Sarah Ann Verity (born 1860), Rosabell Catherine Cartmel née Verity (born 1860) (GRO index: Births Sep 1860 Verity Rosabella Catherine Doncaster 9c 454) and Isabella Verity (1861–1902)) Verity and his full brother Edwin were initially cared for in Woolley, West Yorkshire by his unmarried uncle James Rogers, who was a shoemaker and farmer, and his elderly, widowed aunt Elizabeth Bennet. By the age of 13 years, Verity was attending school and being brought up by another uncle, railway porter Joseph Bell, (Note: Joseph Bell (1829–1914)) and his aunt Elizabeth Bell, (Note: Elizabeth Bell née Marland (1816–1882). Elizabeth Bell was the sister of Charles Verity's first wife Harriet Verity née Marland, mother of Edwin and Fred Verity.) in Bradford, West Yorkshire.

By 1881 Verity and his brother Edwin were living at 25 Brunswick Place, Leeds, and at the respective ages of 23 and 26 were master ironmongers. (Note: In 19th-century England, a "master" artisan or trader was one who had sufficient skill, reputation and income to be able to employ workers and to take apprentices. "Master" in that context did not imply academic qualifications.) On 12 June 1872, at Kirk Bramwith, Doncaster, South Yorkshire, Verity married Mary Heptinstall, (Note: Mary Verity née Heptinstall (1851 – 1 January 1930). GRO index: Births Mar 1851 Heptinstall Mary Doncaster XXII 125. Marriages Jun 1872 Verity Joshua Marland and Heptinstall Mary. Doncaster 9c 891. Deaths Mar 1930 Verity Mary 78 Leeds North 9b 302.) daughter of farmer John Heptinstall of Braithwaite Hall, and they had five children. (Note: Children of Fred Veirty and Mary Heptinstall: John Heptinstall Verity (1873–1945), Ernest Albert Verity (15 October 1874 – 18 October 1918), Percy Marland Verity (1876–1954), Charles Frederick Verity (1877–1954), Beatrice Mary Roebuck King née Verity (1880 – 13 October 1954).) Two of his children, John Heptinstall Verity and Ernest Albert Verity, were alumni of Leeds Grammar School. Fred Verity's nephew, via his brother, ironmonger Edwin Verity, (Note: Edwin Verity (Stanley, West Riding of Yorkshire 1845 – 11 March 1909). GRO index: Deaths Mar 1909 Verity Edwin 54 Leeds 9b 421) was the sound engineer and inventor Claude Hamilton Verity. (Note: Claude Hamilton Verity (1880–1949). GRO index: Births Jun 1880 Verity Claud Hamilton Leeds 9b 627. Deaths Sep 1949 Verity Claud H. 69 Newton A. 7a 441. Note: He was named "Claud" on birth and death certificates, but "Claude" on his marriage certificate.) In 1891, Verity was living with his wife, four of his children and a groom, in a house named "Bel Vue" in Horsforth, Leeds. At that time he was describing himself as an employer and iron merchant, and his son John Heptinstall Verity, aged 17, was an ironmonger's assistant. His last address was "West Hill", Chapeltown, Leeds. Verity died at the age of 49 years on 5 February 1897, and was buried at Lawnswood Cemetery, Leeds, on 9 February 1897. (Note: Burial of Joshua Marland Verity. Plot C55, Lawnswood Cemetery and Crematorium, Adel, Leeds.) He left £14,368 14s 9d (equivalent to £1,614,716.96 in 2025). His wife Mary died on 1 January 1930, and was also buried at Lawnswood Cemetery.

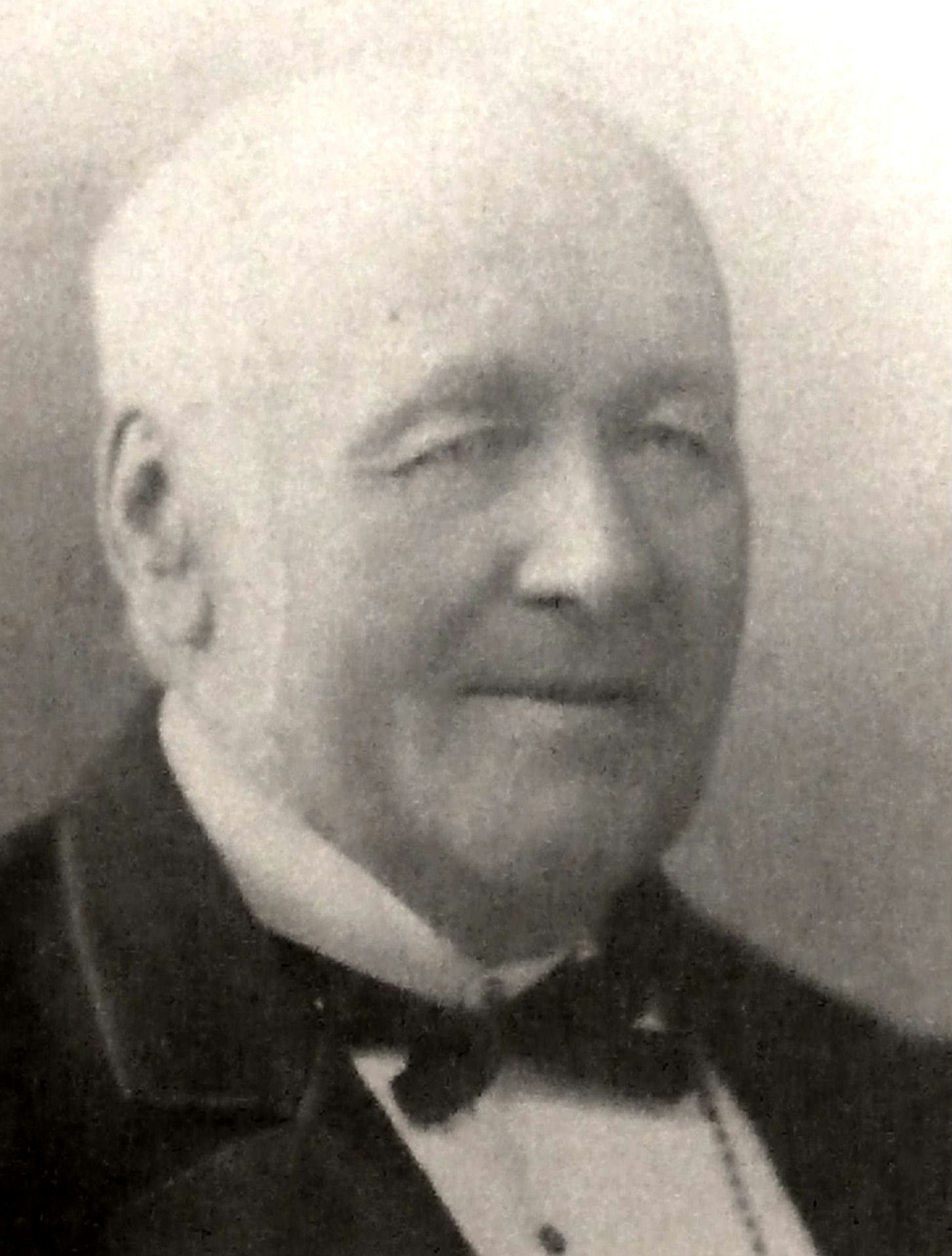
Verity's father, Charles Verity

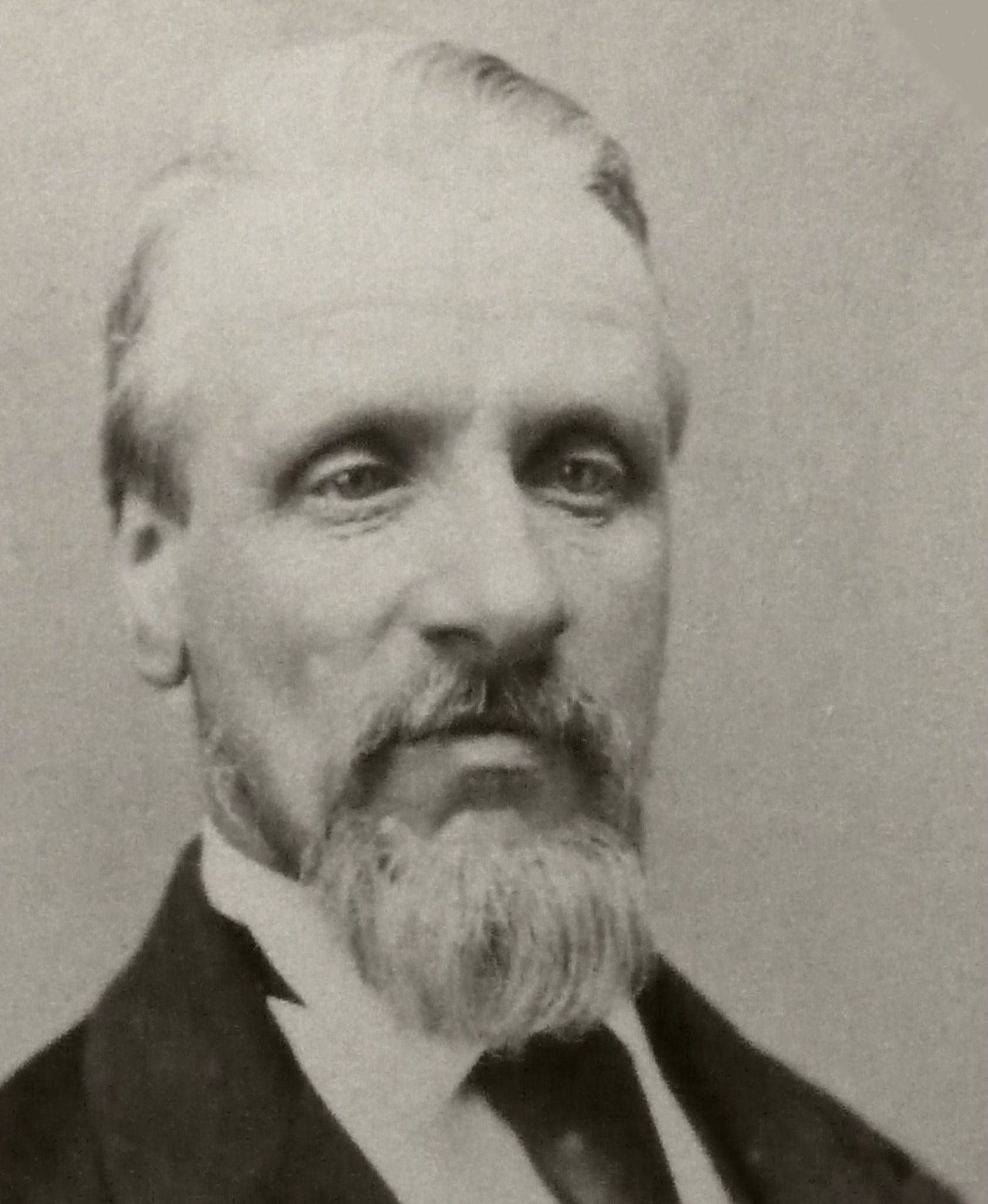
Joseph Bell, Verity's uncle who brought him up

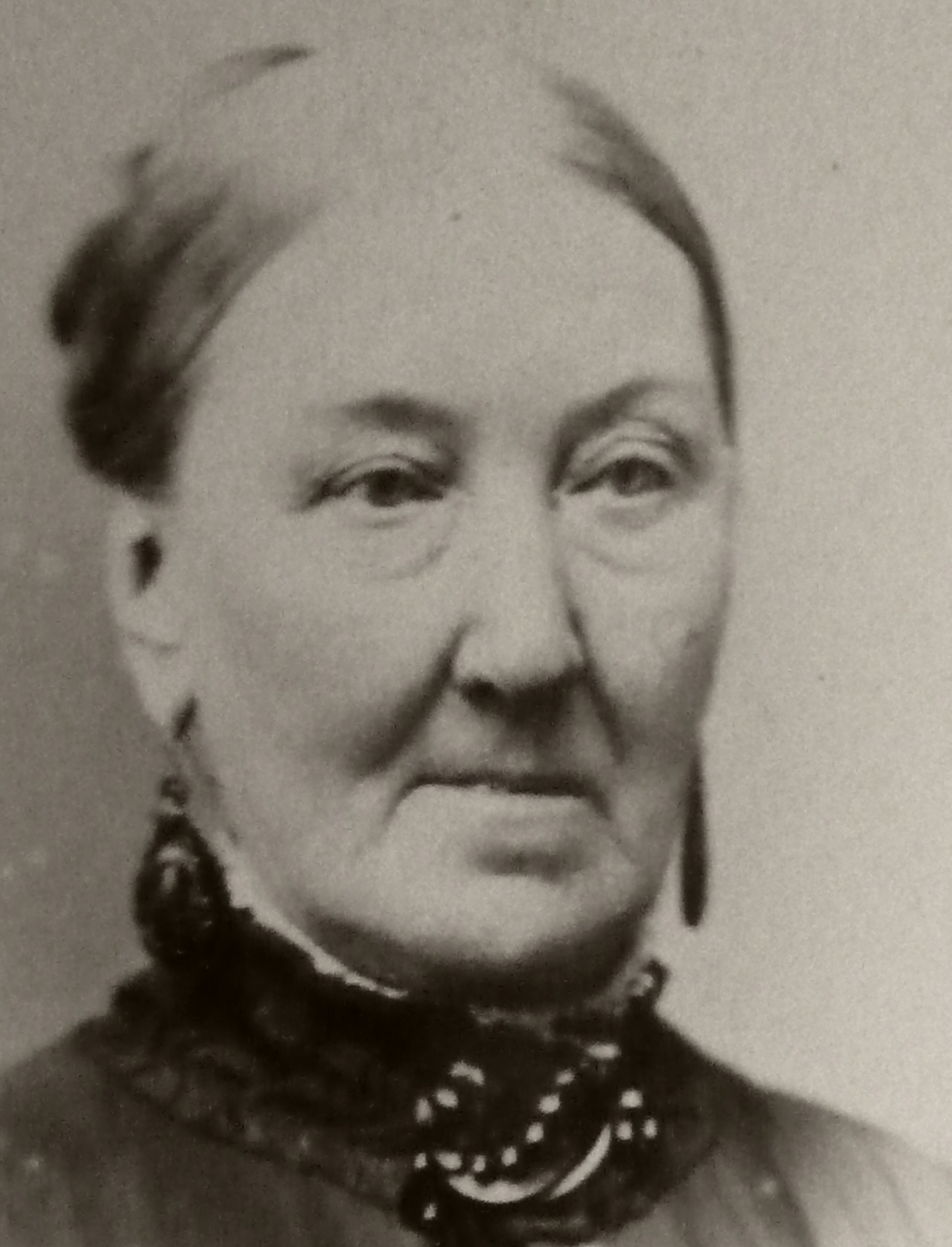
Elizabeth Bell, Verity's aunt who brought him up

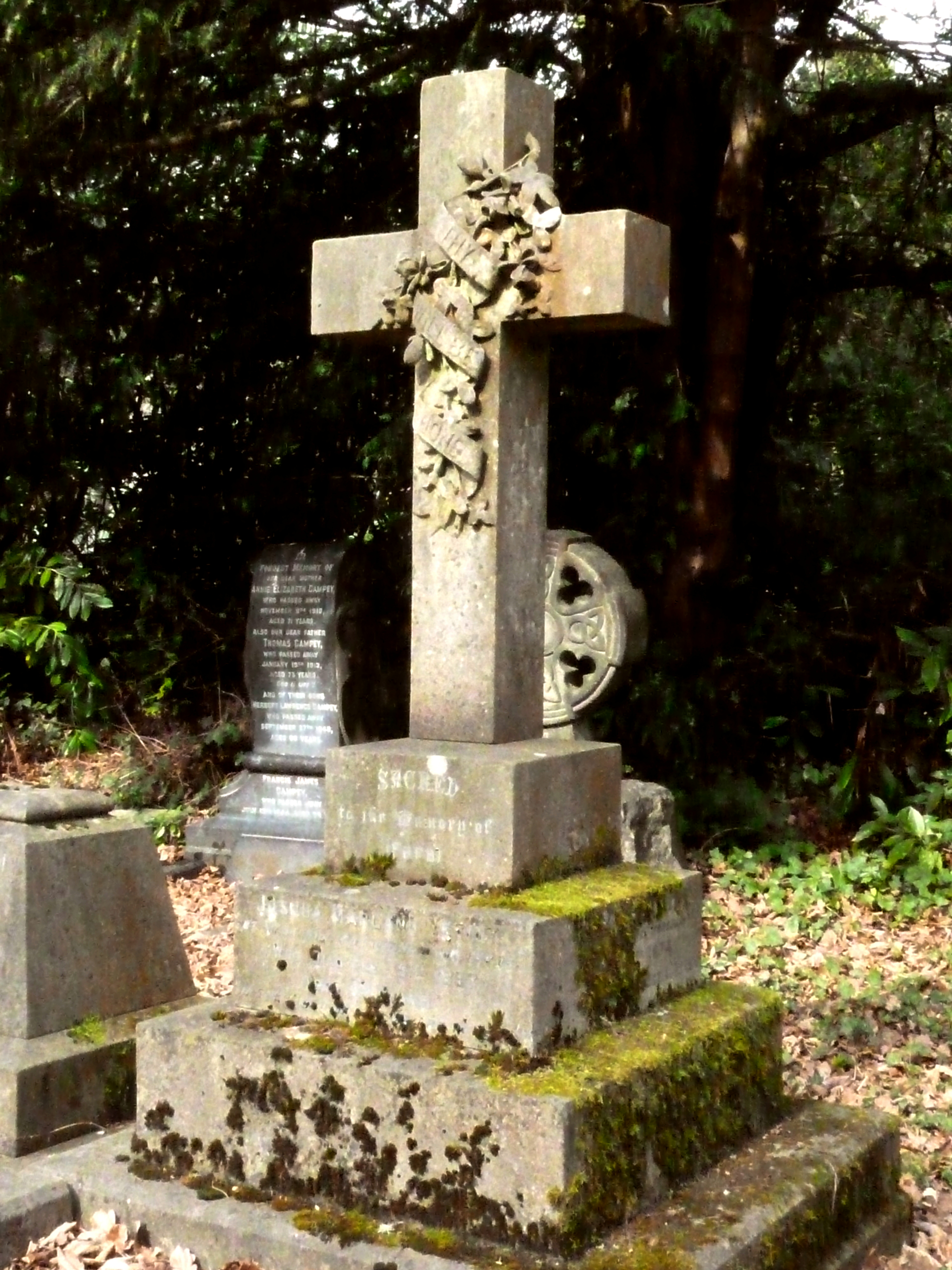
Verity's gravestone at Lawnswood Cemetery

== Business ==
=== Ironmongery tradition in 18th- and 19th-century Leeds ===
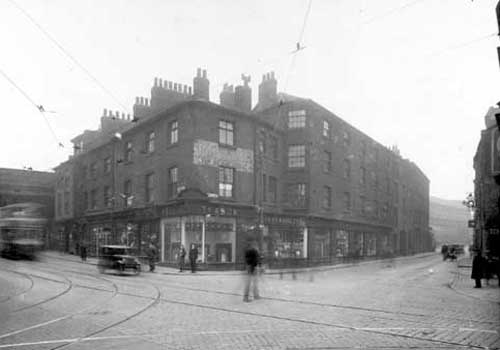
Premises of Fred Verity

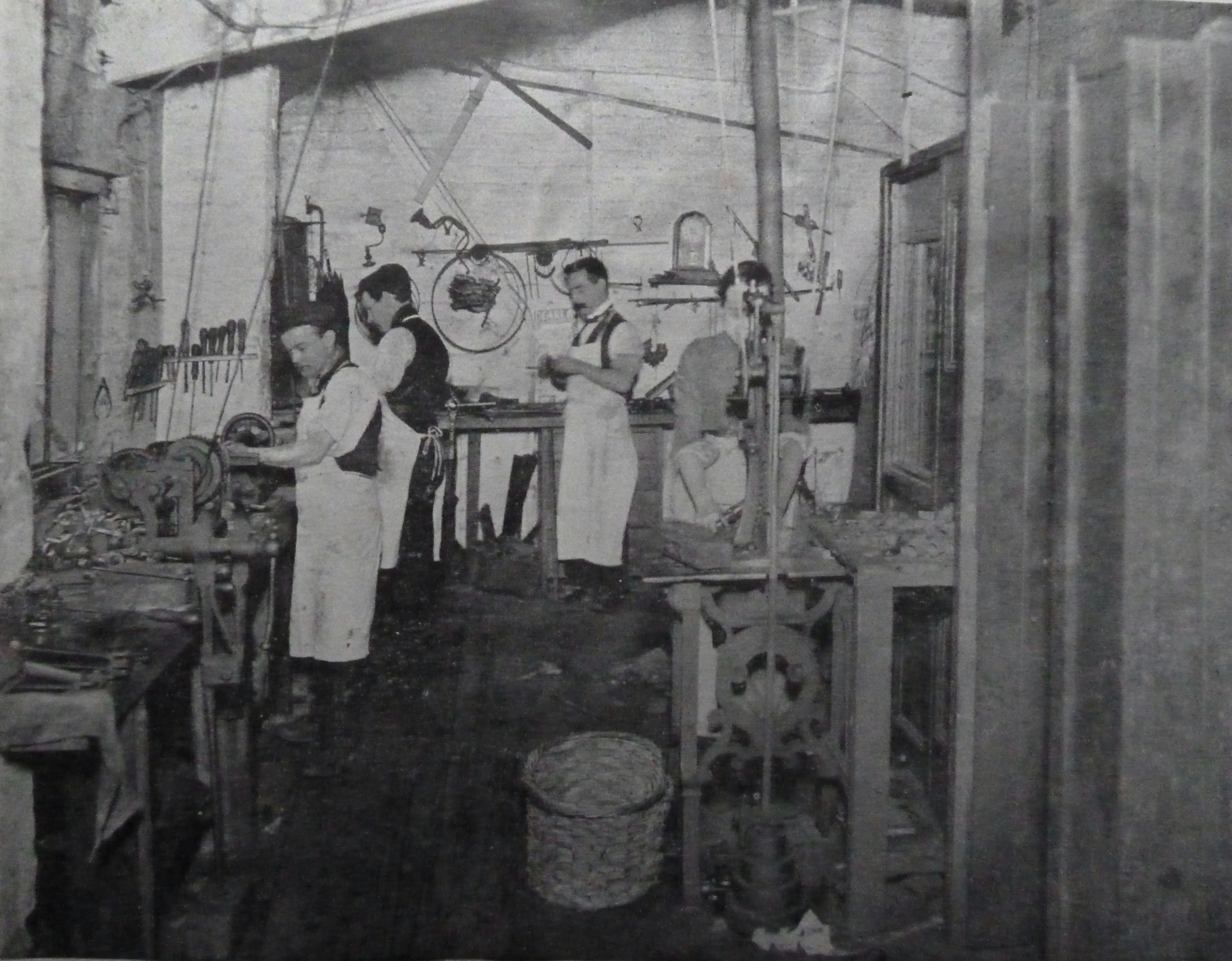
Verity's workshop in Hunslet

In 1869, Verity, with his brother and business partner Edwin Verity, took over an ironmongery business which, according their company's later advertisements, had been started in 1792. This preceding business or businesses operated at various addresses in Leeds, and passed through the ownership of several people, and it may be that the Verity advertisements were referring to a tradition of major ironmongery businesses in Leeds, rather than a longstanding family firm. The early ironmongers in Leeds were not just retailers; they were blacksmiths, ironfounders and brassfounders. The earliest recorded ironmonger in 18th-century Leeds was Maurice Tobin, a Leeds whitesmith and ironmonger, and his business was inherited in 1773 by his son Henry Tobin, who had been abroad. In 1774 Henry Tobin passed on the whitesmith section of the business to his cousin John Rogers, and the ironmongery section to John Fothergill of Boar Lane, Leeds, who had purchased Tobin's ironmongery stock. By 1780, William Beezon, a former apprentice to John Fothergill, had the business, and was selling ironmongery "opposite the Old Bank" on Briggate, Leeds. Following Beezon there is an information gap. Moreover, Verity's builders' catalogue of 1897 states that his business originated in 1818. The next recorded Leeds ironmonger was wholesaler Robert Squire James, who went bankrupt in 1852. John Wright of 36 Boar Lane, set up his ironmongery business in June 1853. On 12 June 1854 his shop caught fire, and stock worth £2,000 (equivalent to £191,702.60 in 2025) was damaged by water being thrown onto it after the fire was extinguished. Again on 11 April 1856 his "extensive premises" on Albion Street and Boar Lane was discovered burning. The fire was extinguished before his stock of gunpowder was set alight. In 1858 ironmonger Fred Sheard was in business in Leeds, followed by George Heaps of 26 Dock Street, Leeds, who went bankrupt in 1858. The Leeds ironmonger, John Clark of 12 Call Lane, Leeds, (Note: John Clark (1816 – 15 April 1870). GRO index: Deaths Jun 1870 Clark John 54 Leeds 9b 268. His grave is in Beckett Street Cemetery, in plot 3313.) is first mentioned in the Press in 1854 as a detaining creditor in a bankruptcy court.

=== Verity Brothers and Verity & Son ===
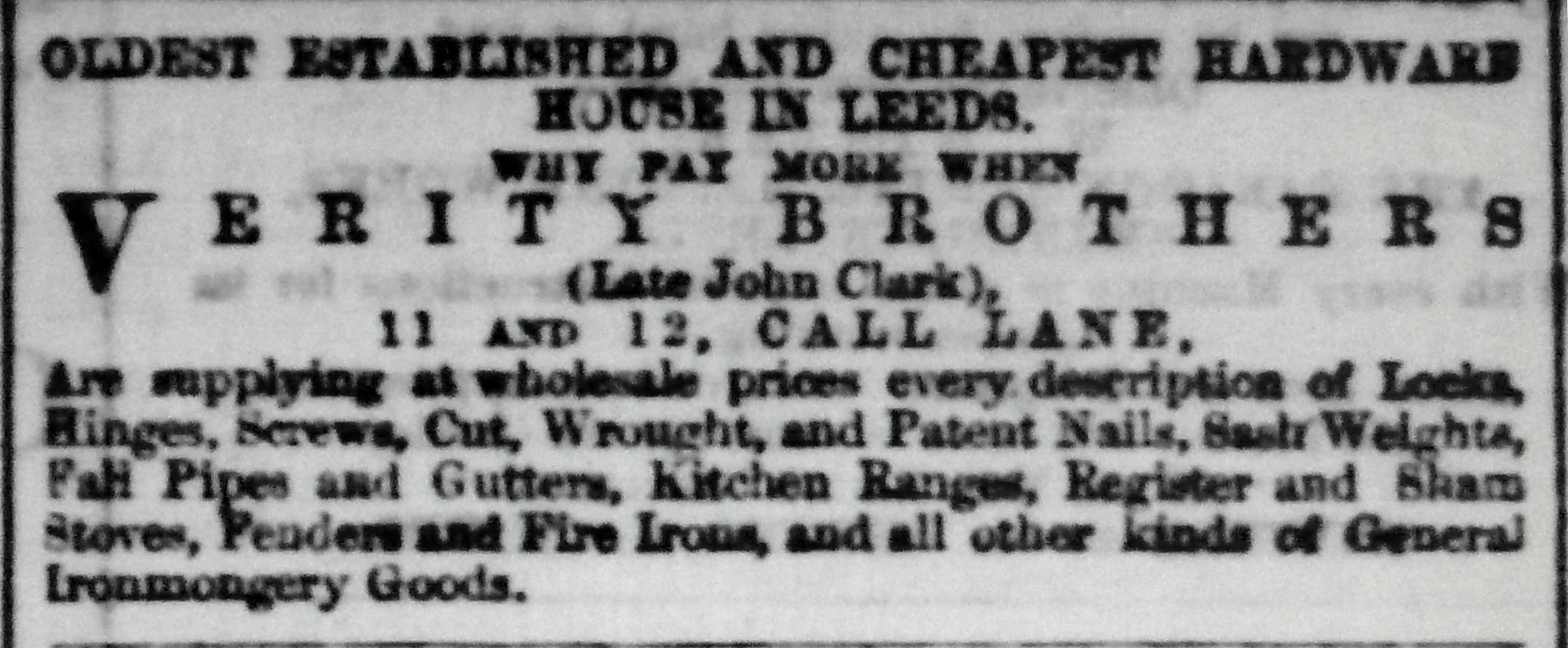
1870 ad showing prior ownership by Clark

Between 1866 and 1868 the marble mason and ironmonger Thomas Verity, (Note: Thomas Verity (1826–6 June 1879), marble mason and ironmonger. GRO index: Deaths Jun 1879 Verity Thomas, age 54 Leeds 9b 354.) who had showrooms in George Street and works in Sunny Bank, Leeds, was manufacturing and selling marble mantelpieces, kitchen ranges and cooking apparatus. In 1868, Smith, Verity & Co. purchased the stock of ironmonger John Clark of 11 and 12 Call Lane, Leeds, and P. Smith passed it on or sold it to Verity Brothers, after the partnership was dissolved in July 1869. So in 1869, at the same address, Fred and Edwin Verity took over the business of ironmonger John Clark, who according to the Verity Brothers had a "long reputation". They established the family hardware manufacturing, wholesale and retail business Verity Brothers (later becoming Fred Verity & Son) on the corner at 174-178 Lower Briggate and 60-68 Call Lane. On 1 January 1895, the Verity Brothers partnership between Edwin Verity and Fred Verity was dissolved. Verity continued with the business as Fred Verity & Sons in Call Lane, while his brother Edwin started up a similar business at 42 Swinegate, Leeds, under his own name. Besides the wholesale and retail emporium, the business premises included a workshop in Hunslet and a works including foundry in Crown Street, behind Leeds Corn Exchange.

In 1898, after Verity's death, the shop was carried on by his descendants, who advertised that the ironmongery business had been "established over 100 years" at 54–58 Call Lane, and that the business was "the oldest established house in the north of England for joiners', builders' and cabinet makers' ironmongery of every Description".

Verity's premises overlooked the site where Louis Le Prince made his first moving picture. In 1895, Verity was advertising coffin furniture and various nails, besides general ironmongery. In 1896, He was advertising his "marble and slate chimney pieces, kitchen ranges, (Note: A restored Fred Verity Kitchen range can be seen here: sellingantiques.co.uk.) register stoves and tiled hearths". On 30 March 1897, shortly before Verity died, the business was advertising garden tools in competitive style. (Note: Following the death of Fred Verity in 1897, the business was carried on by his sons John Heptinstall Verity (d.1945) and Charles Frederick Verity (d.1954). They added a fireplace department and Verity's Garage in The Calls, Leeds, and between 1910 and 1920 the business flourished so they expanded the premises along Call Lane and Briggate. The Newcastle Upon Tyne branch of Fred Verity & Son commenced around 1909 when Charles Frederick Verity and his family moved north. After John Heptinstall Verity died, his sons James Verity and Fredierick Cowle Verity continued with the business in Leeds until 1960, when it was sold to Rycrofts Ltd in Bradford. (From Verity, F.C. (1963), A Brief History of Fred Verity & Sons, Ironmongers, Briggate and Call Lane, Leeds).) Verity also designed and manufactured cast- and sheet-iron garden rollers, (Note: Fred Verity cast iron garden roller fittings for Thomas Green: see Flickr and Flickr) and was a brass-founder. By 1909, the products advertised were: "kitchen ranges and mantels, stoves and tiles, baths and lavatories, barb wire (sic), mangers, corn bins, hay ricks, pig troughs, wire netting, garden tools, wood trellis work, galvanised sheets, gas boilers, knife machines, wringers, dust bins, barrows, cisterns, manhole covers, grindstones, lime screens, drain clearing machines". In 1930 a court dispute over an alleged breach of warranty revealed that the firm was still casting in iron and gunmetal.

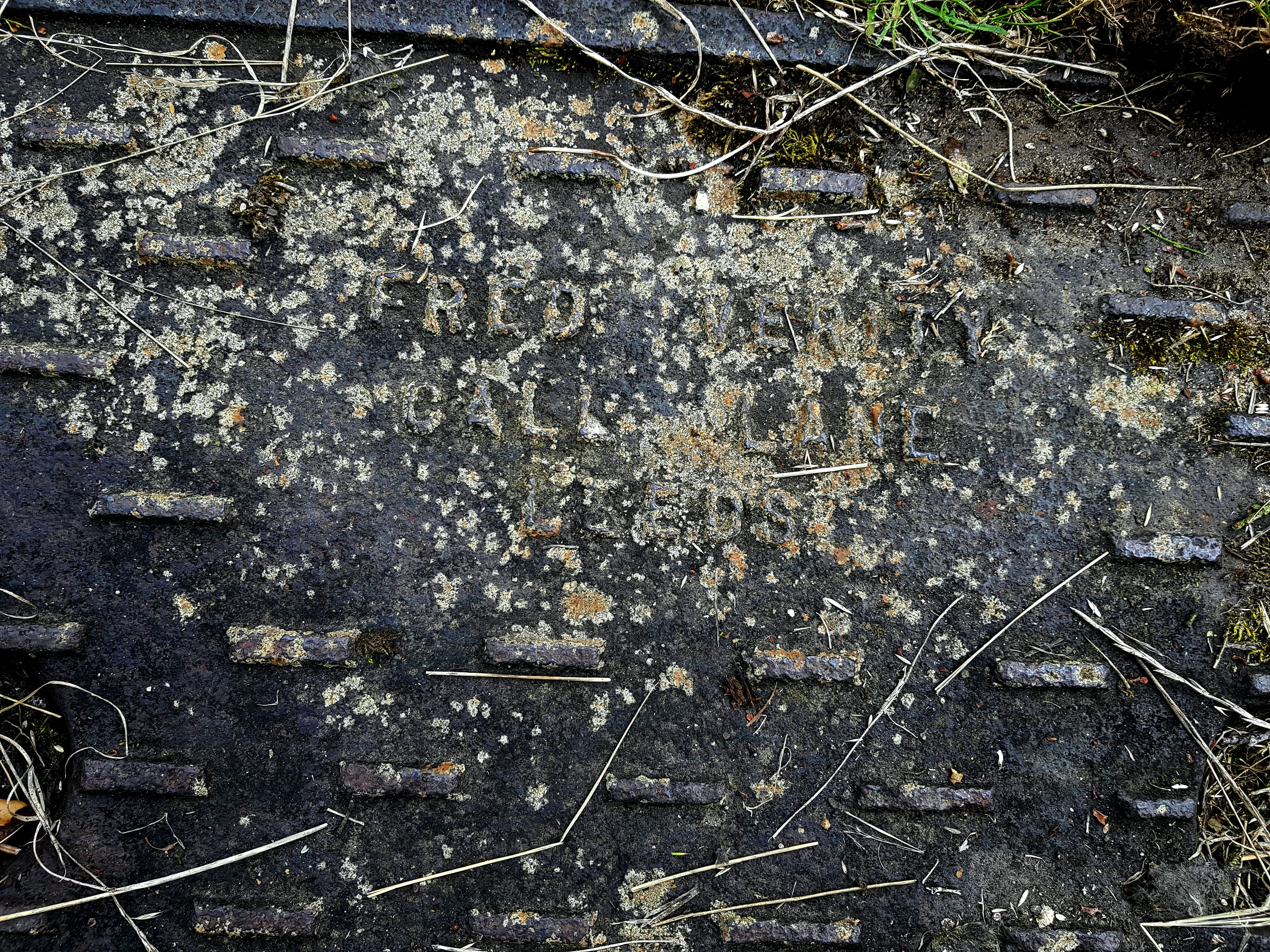
19th-century manhole cover, by Fred Verity, on farmland near Harrogate

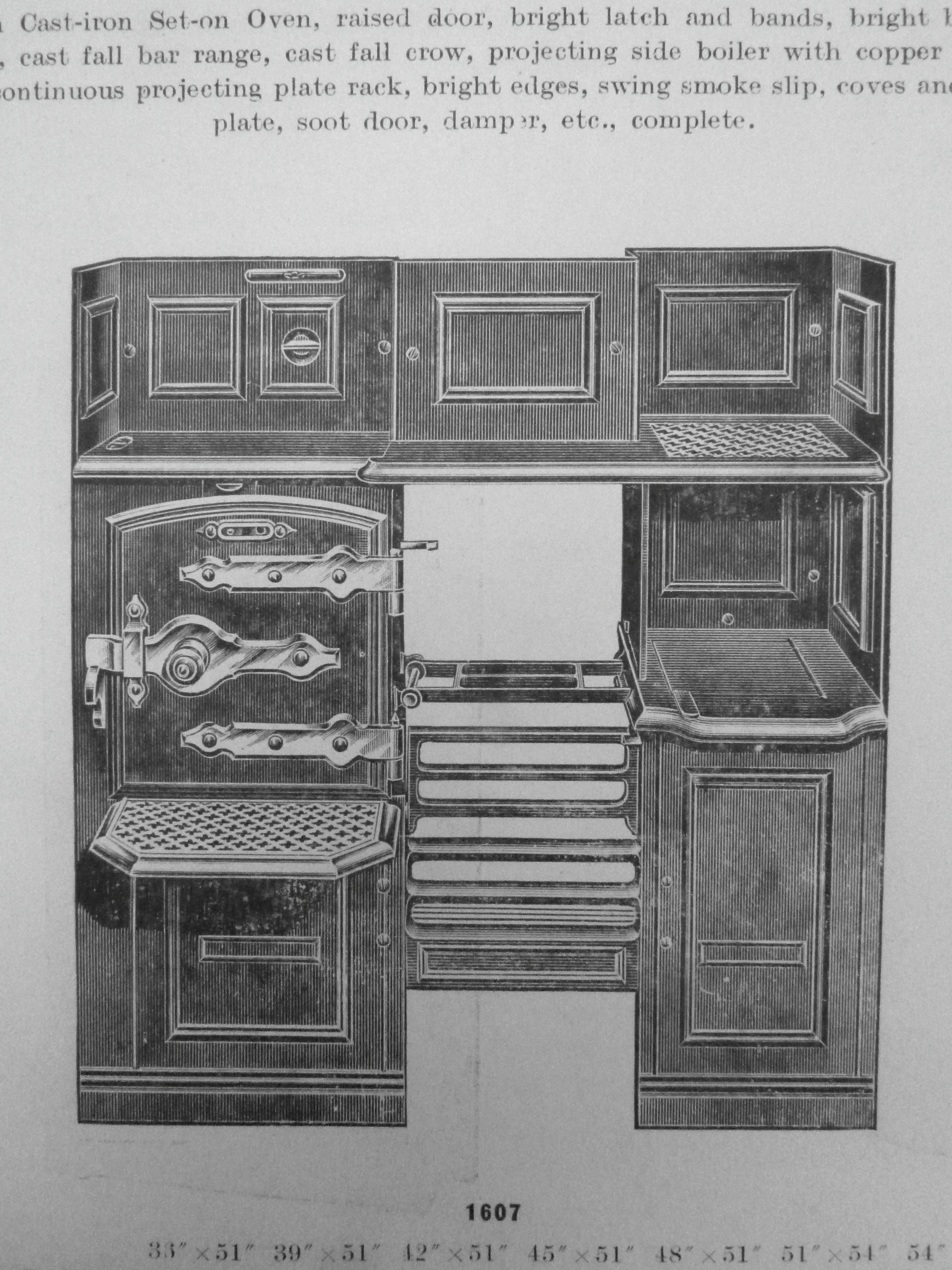
Kitchen range by Fred Verity & Sons, 1890s

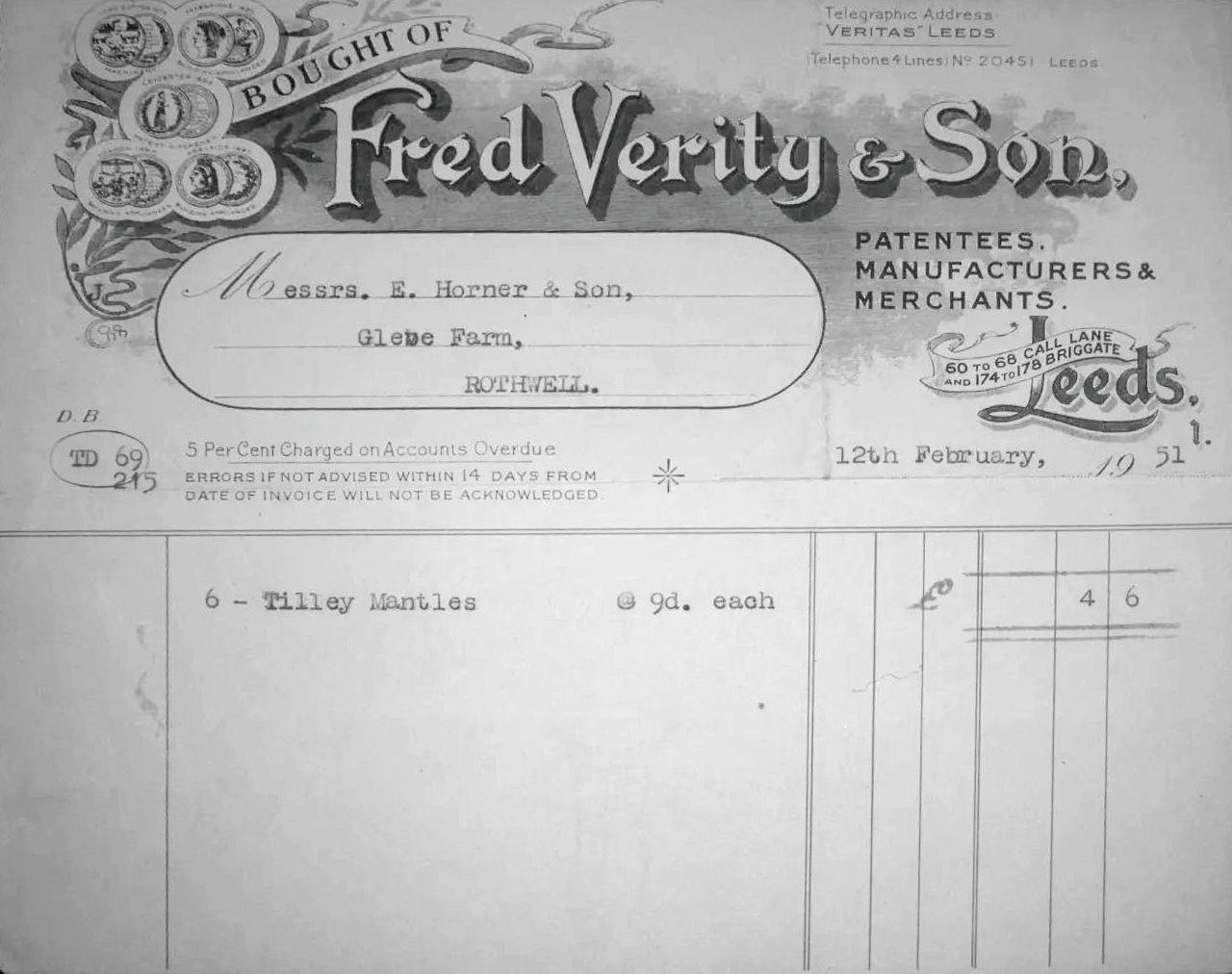
Letterhead by Fred Verity & Sons

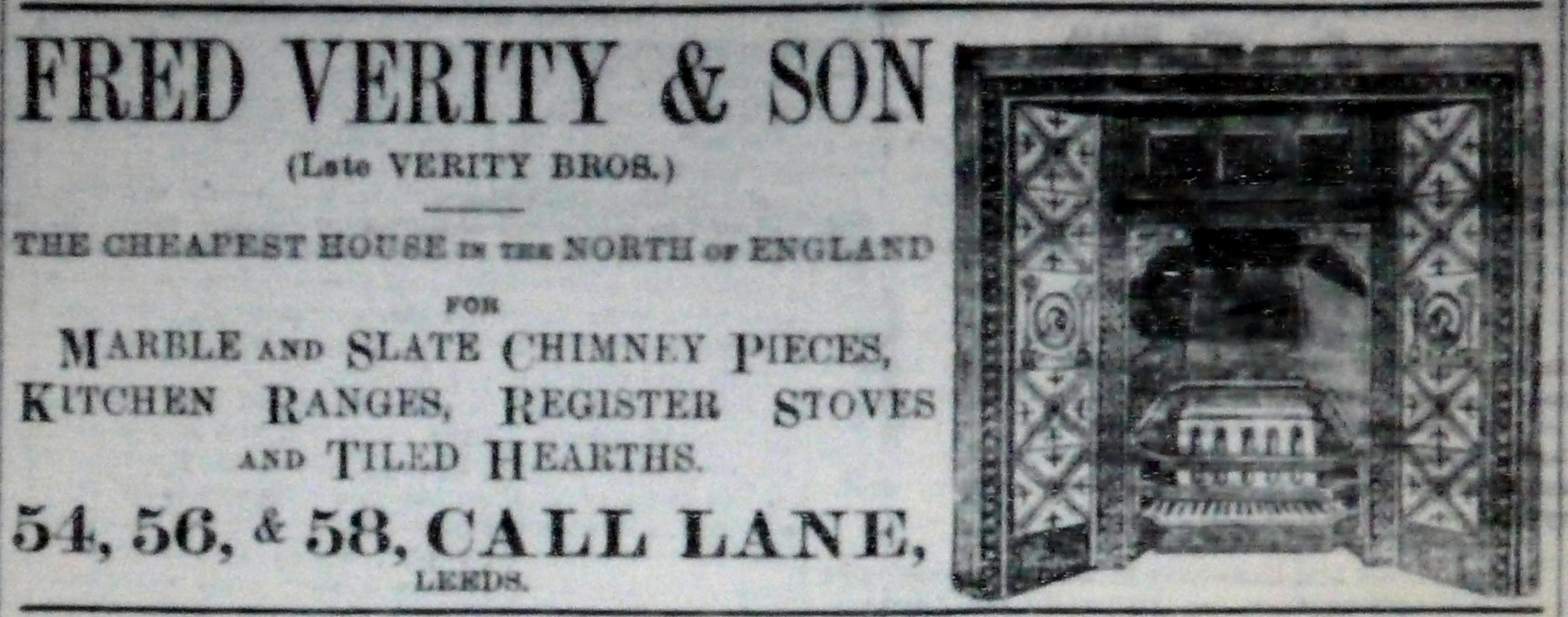
1896 ad by Fred Verity & Sons

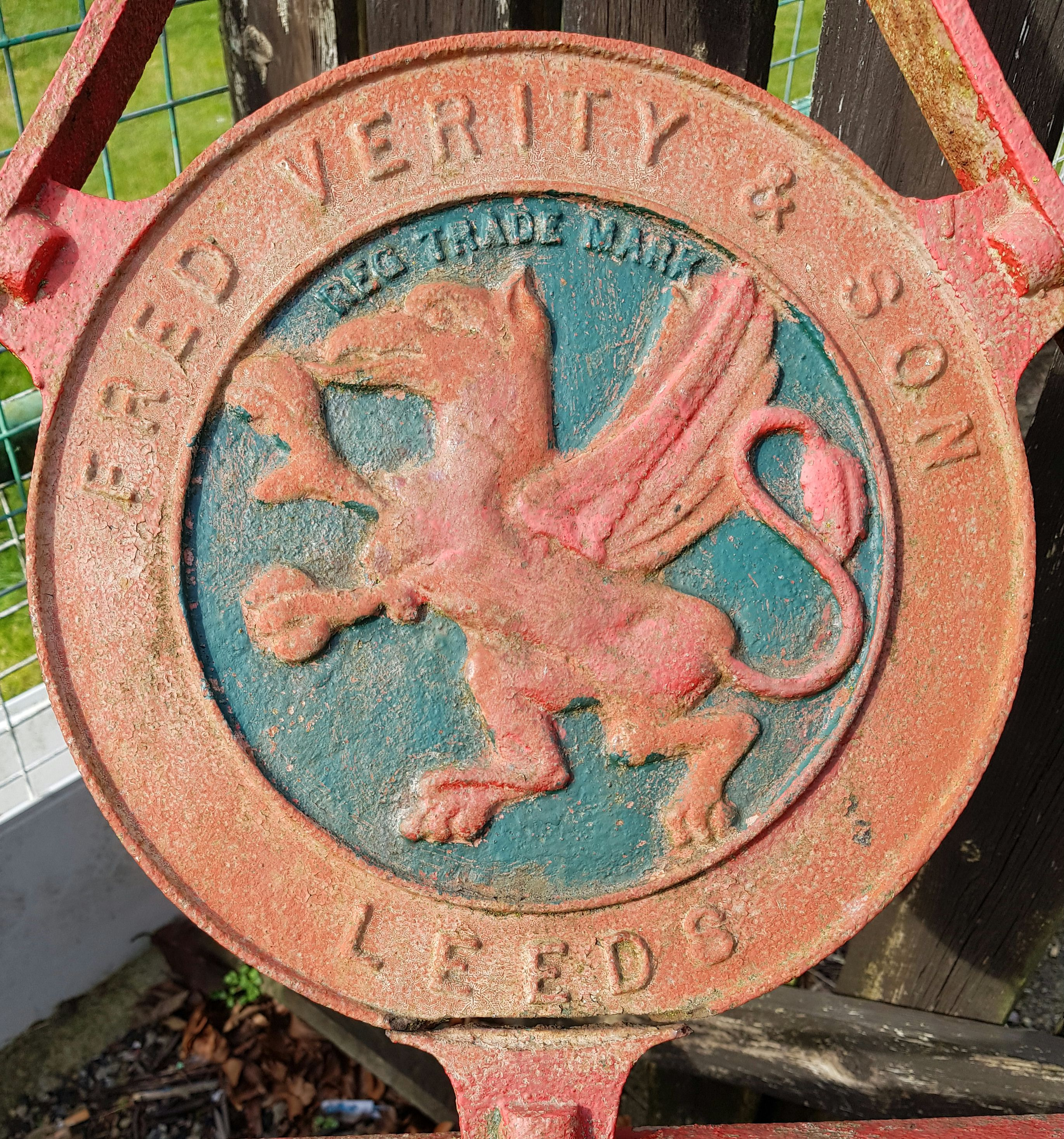
Fred Verity & Sons signature on a hand lawn roller

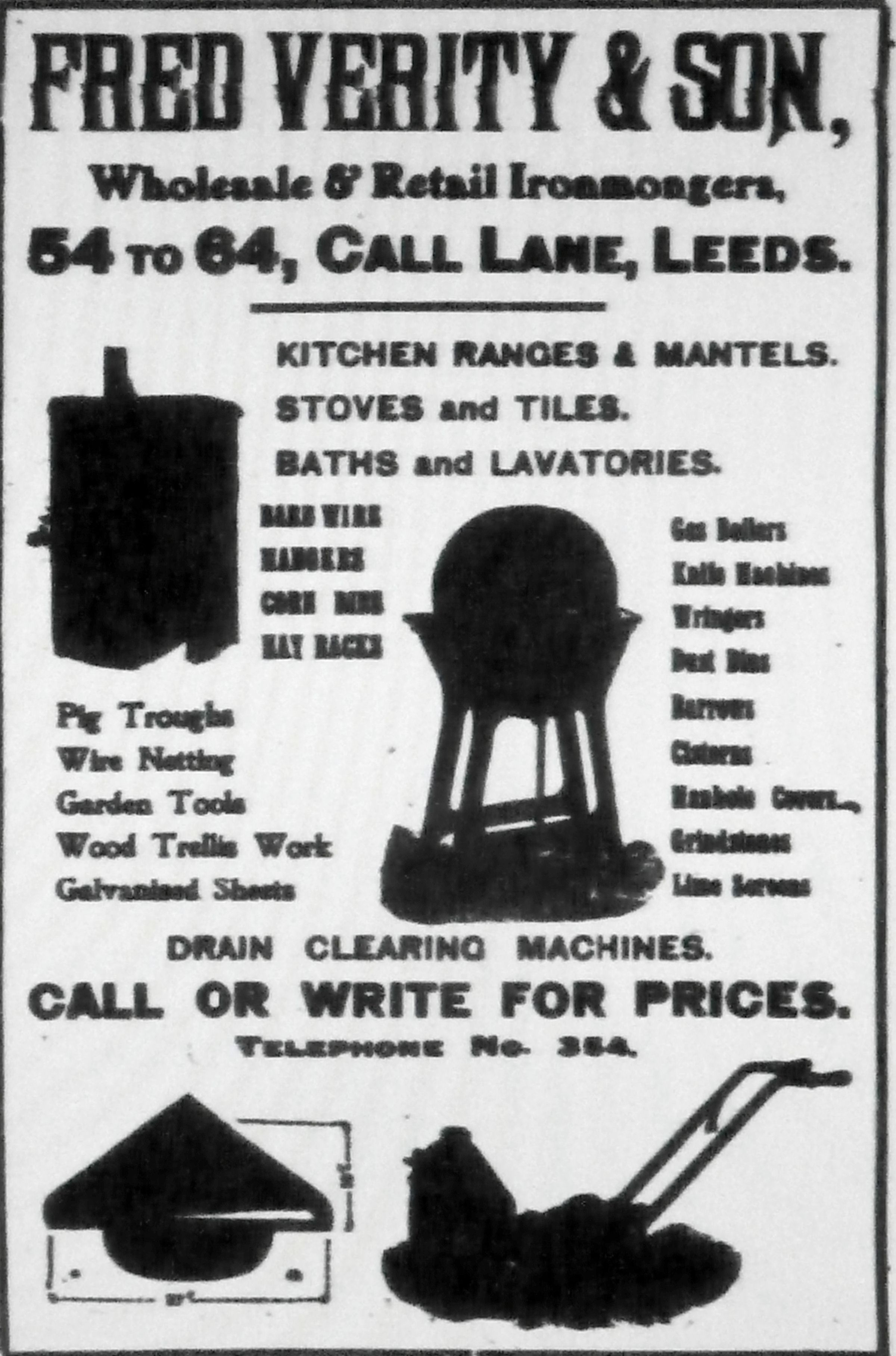
1909 ad by Fred Verity & Sons

=== Patents and inventions ===
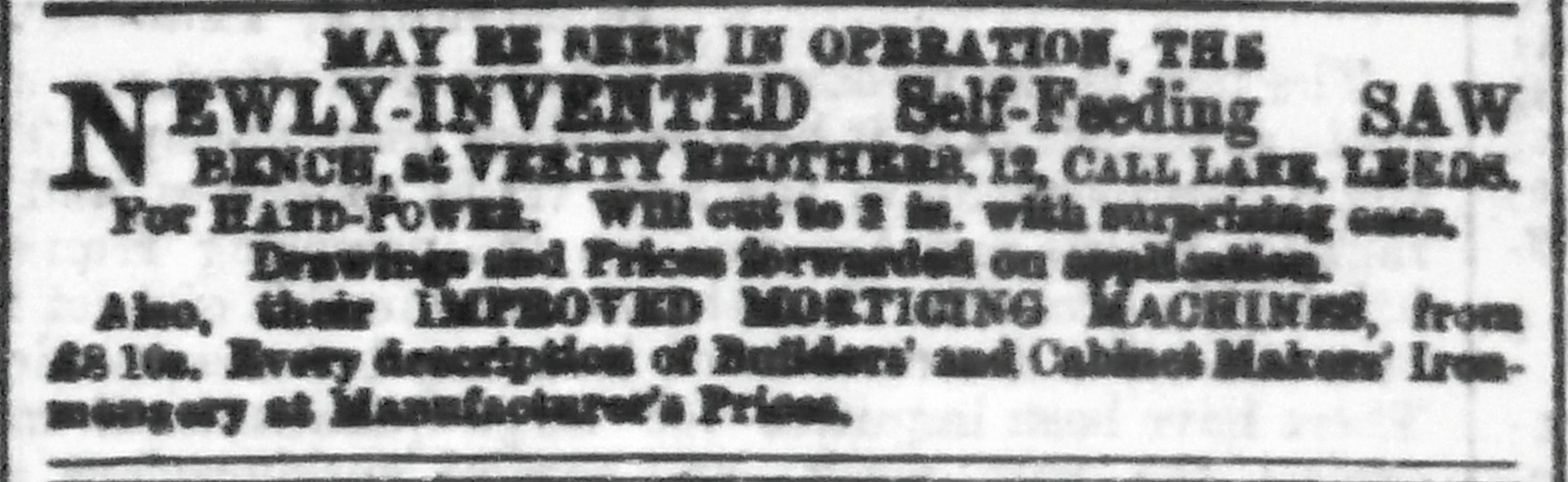
Verity's ad for self-feeding sawbench, 1870

Verity, like his nephew Claude Hamilton Verity, was an inventor. He, his brother Edwin and their colleague Benjamin Banks together registered the following designs (the list may be incomplete):

- 17 July 1884. "An automatic pivot or bearing, for looking glasses and other similarly pivoted articles". Joshua Marland Verity, Edwin Verity and Benjamin Banks.
- 11 December 1884. "Mechanical movement or means for opening, closing, staying and securing windows, skylights, dampers, ventilators, and suchlike articles". Joshua M. Verity, Edwin Verity and Benjamin Banks.
- 15 March 1886, "Improvements in the means and methods of advertising and in apparatus used in connection therewith". Joshua Marland Verity, Edwin Verity and Benjamin Banks.
- 22 May 1886. "An improved combined hopper light regulator and fastener". Joshua Marland Verity, Edwin Verity and Benjamin Banks.
- 6 August 1887. "An improved means of attaching compound springs and air checks to doors and the like". Joshua Verity, Edwin Verity and Benjamin Banks.

Additionally, Verity and his brother Edwin advertised items and ideas which they appear to have invented; for example in 1879 they advertised a "newly-invented self-feeding sawbench", for which they were offering demonstrations, drawings and prices.

== Exhibitions ==
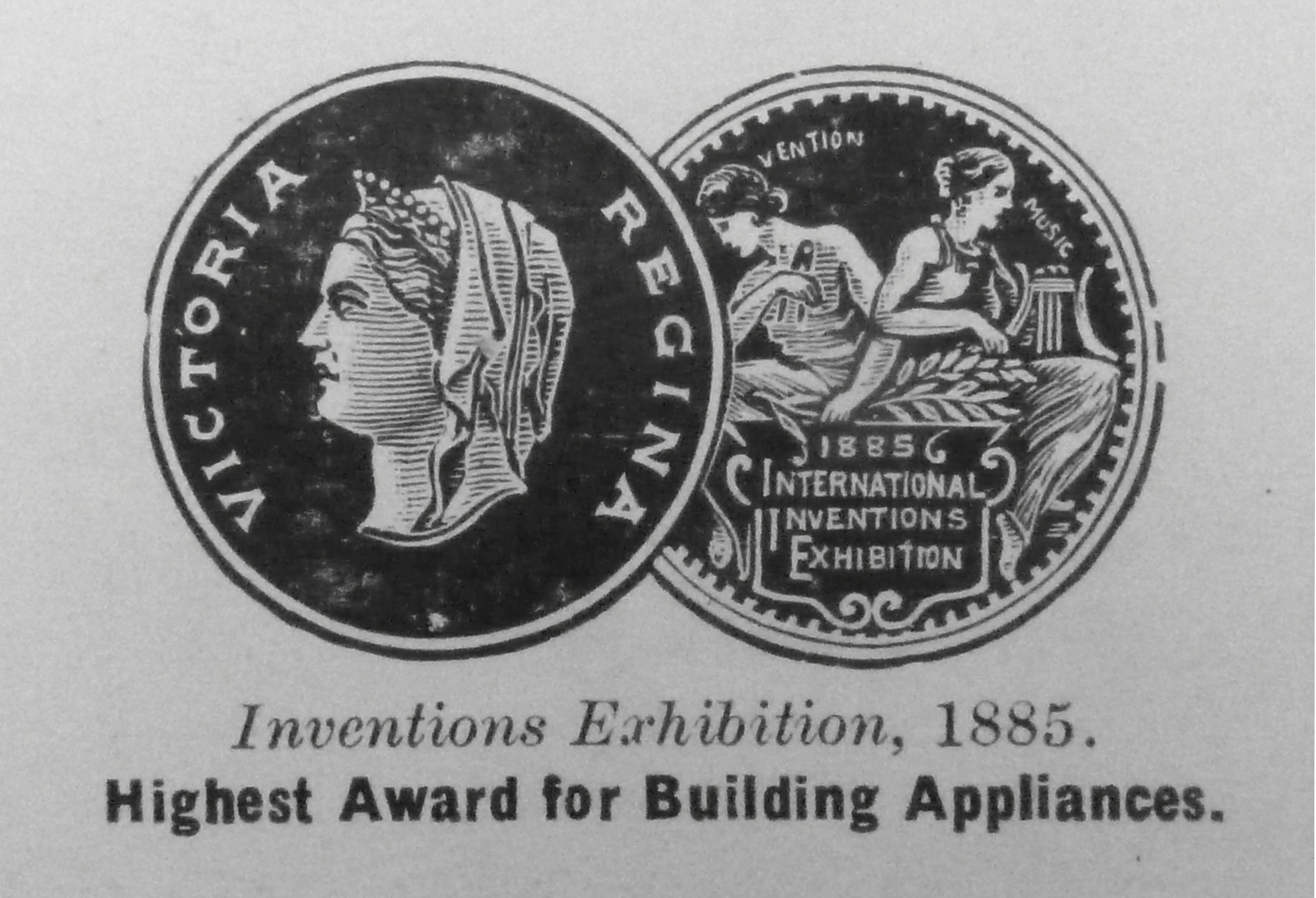
1885 International Inventions Exhibition medal

With his brother Edwin as Verity Brothers, and as Fred Verity & Sons, Verity was awarded various medals at trade exhibitions (citations quoted as engraved on the medals):

- 1879, Long Sutton Agricultural Association, "first prize medal, extra prize for machinery", awarded to Verity Brothers, Leeds.
- 1885, Exhibition of Sanitary Apparatus and Appliances, Leicester, prize medal of the Sanitary Institute, "awarded to E. and J.M. Verity for Crabtree kitchener by the Sanitary Institute of Great Britain as a special mark of merit".
- 1885, International Inventions Exhibition, "highest award for building appliances".
- 1886, International Cookery and Food Exhibition, to E. and J.M. Verity.
- 1887, Building Trades Exhibition, Agricultural Hall, Islington, "awarded by the Society of Architects to E. and J.M. Verity for superiority, workmanship and material".
- 1887, Jubilee International Exhibition, Adelaide, Australia, "first order of merit".
- 1895, Smithfield Show, Leeds, to Fred Verity & Son, "for specialities in range and building appliances".
- 1895 October and November, General Trades Industrial Exhibition, Leeds, "awarded to Verity Bros, Leeds, England, first order of merit".

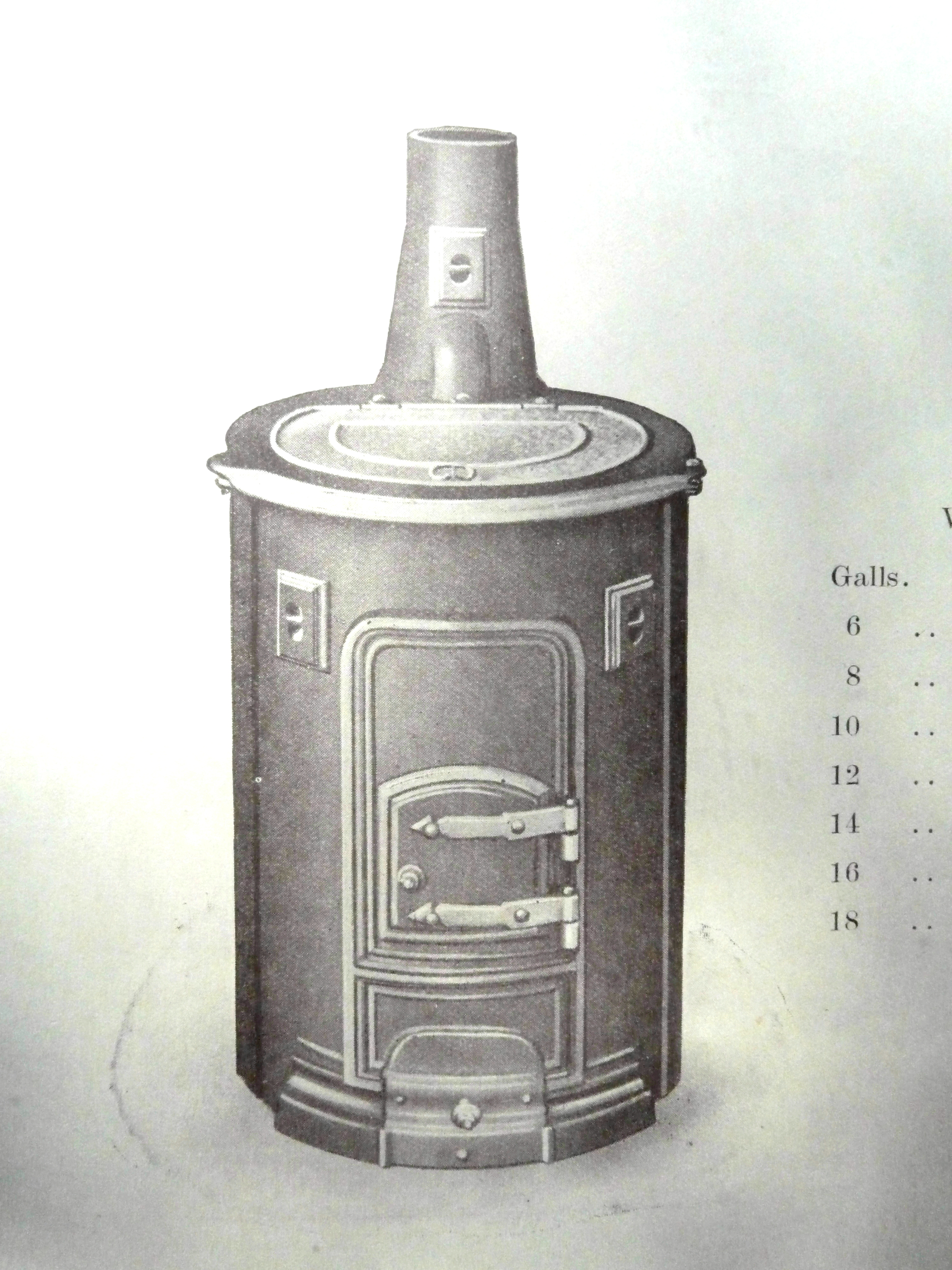
A Fred Verity boiler

== Collections ==
There is a Fred Verity boiler in the National Trust's collection, at the Farmhouse & Outhouse, Brighouse Farm, Duddon Valley, Cumbria. This is a World Heritage Site: The English Lake District (1452615).
