= List of people from Yorkshire =

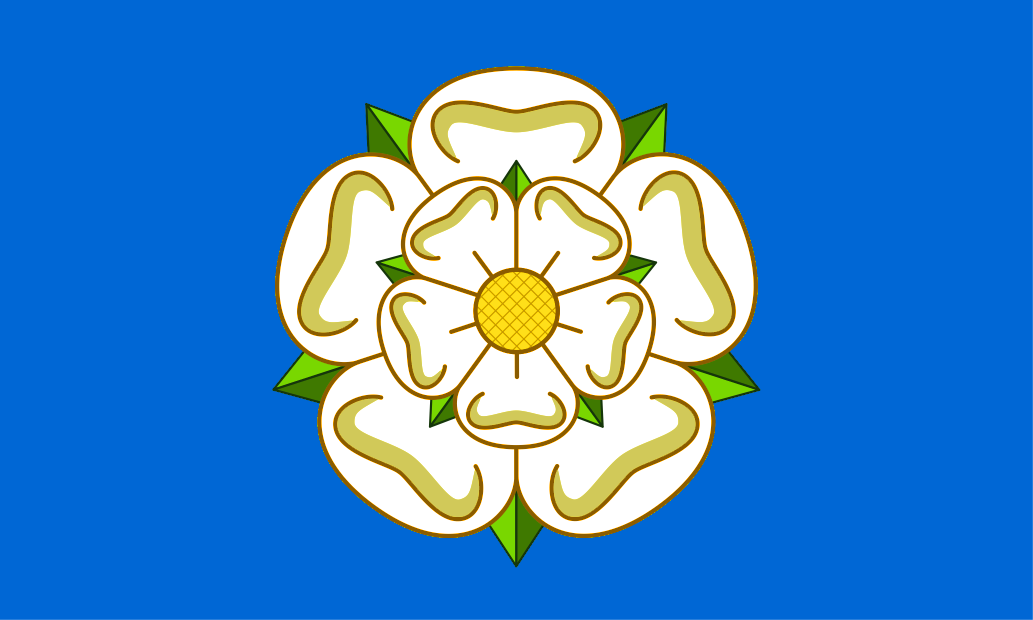
Flag of Yorkshire

Location of Yorkshire on map of the historic counties of England

This is a list of people from Yorkshire. Yorkshire is the largest historic county in both England and the United Kingdom. Some of the most notable figures from the county are:

== Lawyers and Jurists ==
Brenda Hale, Baroness Hale of Richmond, President of the British Supreme Court, 2017–2020

== Inventors, explorers, scientists and pioneers ==
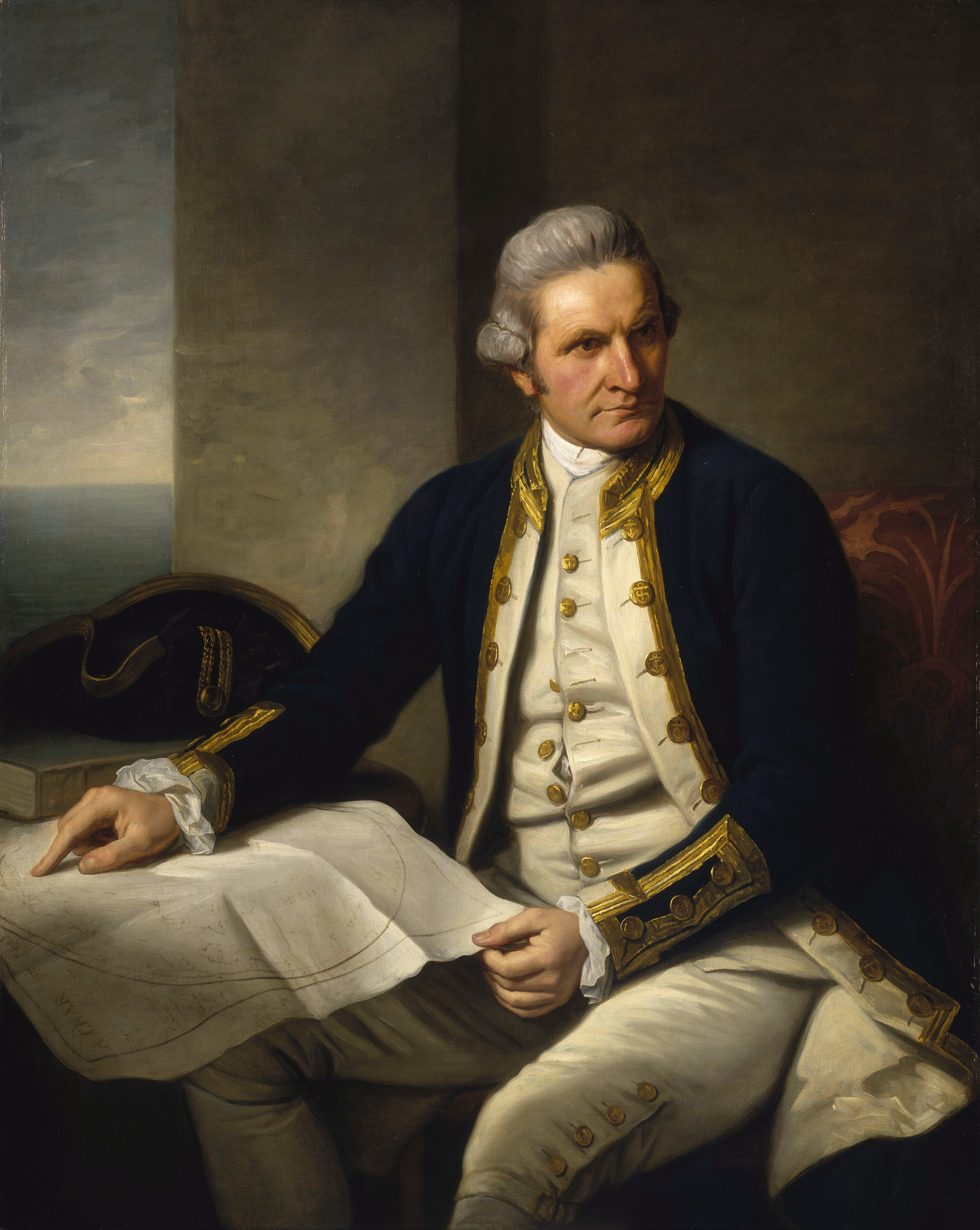
Captain James Cook

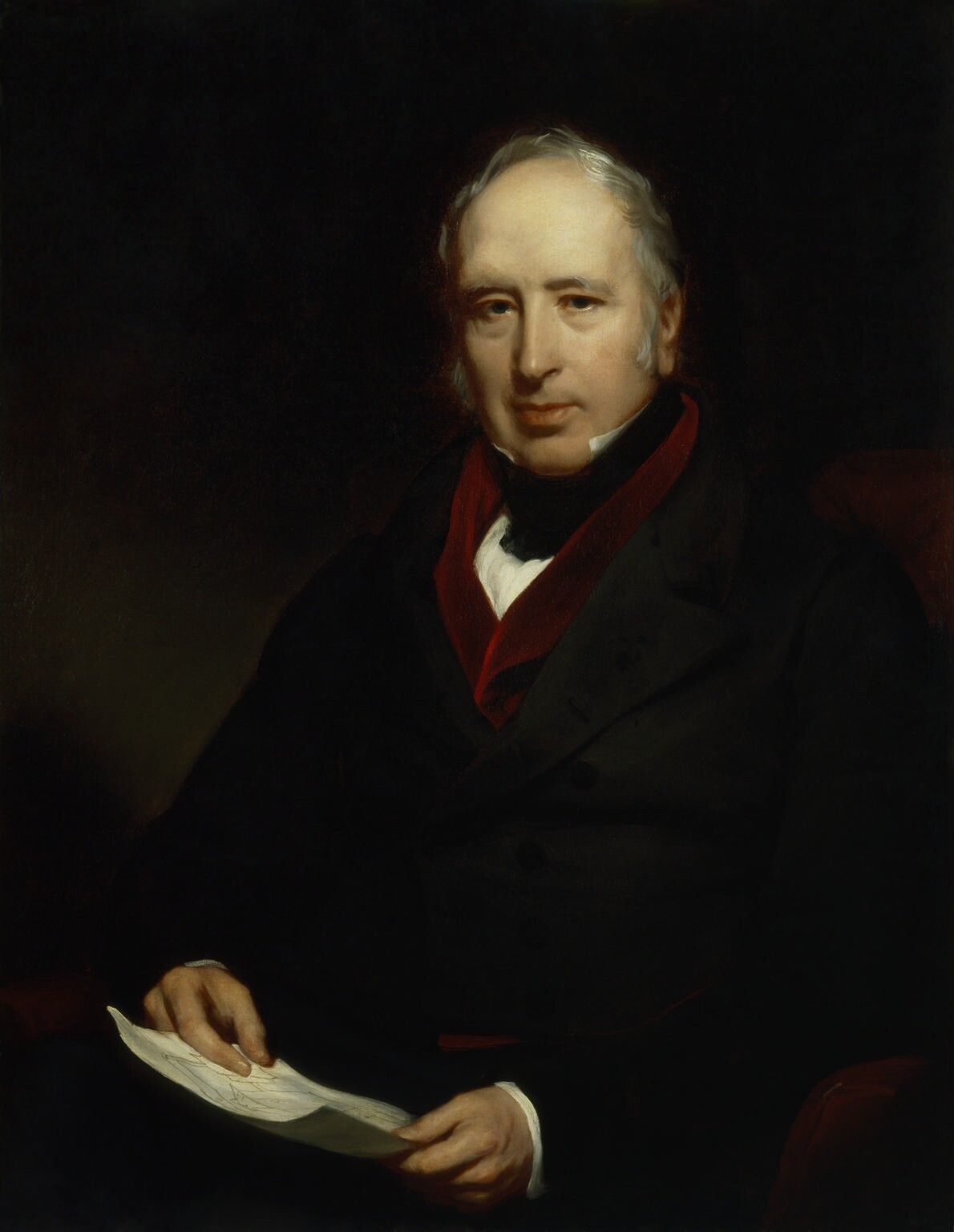
Sir George Cayley

Name	Place	Life	Comments	Reference
Edward Victor Appleton		1892–1965	Nobel Prize in Physics in 1947	
James Henry Atkinson	Leeds	1849–1942	inventor of the mousetrap	
Donald Bailey		1901–1985	inventor of the Bailey Bridge	
William Bateson		1861–1926	geneticist; first to use term "genetics"	
George Birkbeck		1776–1841	doctor, philanthropist, founder of Birkbeck College	
Joseph Bramah	Barnsley	1748–1814	invented hydraulic press; one of two founders of hydraulic engineering	
Harry Brearley		1871–1948	Sheffield inventor of stainless steel	
Henry Briggs		1561–1630	perfected system of logarithms used today by astronomers, navigators	
Phil Burgan		1951–	pharmacist; CEO and Chairman of MMCG	
Ralph Burton		d.1768	British soldier and Canadian settler	
Sir George Cayley	born in Scarborough	1773–1857	engineer, one of the most important people in the history of aeronautics	
Capt. James Cook	Marton, Middlesbrough	1728–79	Georgian oceanic explorer	
Col. Thomas Cresap	born in Skipton, Yorkshire	circa 1700–1790	Western Maryland pioneer	
Rick Dickinson		1956(?)	industrial designer responsible for the ZX80, ZX81, ZX Spectrum and Sinclair QL keyboards and cases	
John Harrison	Foulby	1693–1776	horologist and mathematician	
Amy Johnson	born in Hull	1903–41	aviator	
Joseph Priestley	born in Birstall	1733–1804	physicist and chemist	
Augustus Pitt Rivers		1827–1900	British Army officer, ethnologist, anthropologist and archaeologist	
Nicholas Saunderson	Thurlstone	1682–1739	Lucasian Professor of Mathematics, University of Cambridge	
Helen Sharman	born in Sheffield	1963–	first British cosmonaut, first Western European woman in space	
Percy Shaw	born in Halifax	1889–1975	inventor of the cat's eyes reflecting roadstuds	
John Smeaton		1724–92	civil engineer responsible for the design of bridges, canals, harbours and lighthouses	
Frederick Walton	born in Sowerby Bridge	1834–1928	inventor of Linoleum	
John Wycliffe		1330–84	theologian, reformist, pioneering translator	
Sīlācāra	born in Hull	1871–1951	one of the earliest western Buddhist monk in modern times	

== Politicians and activists ==
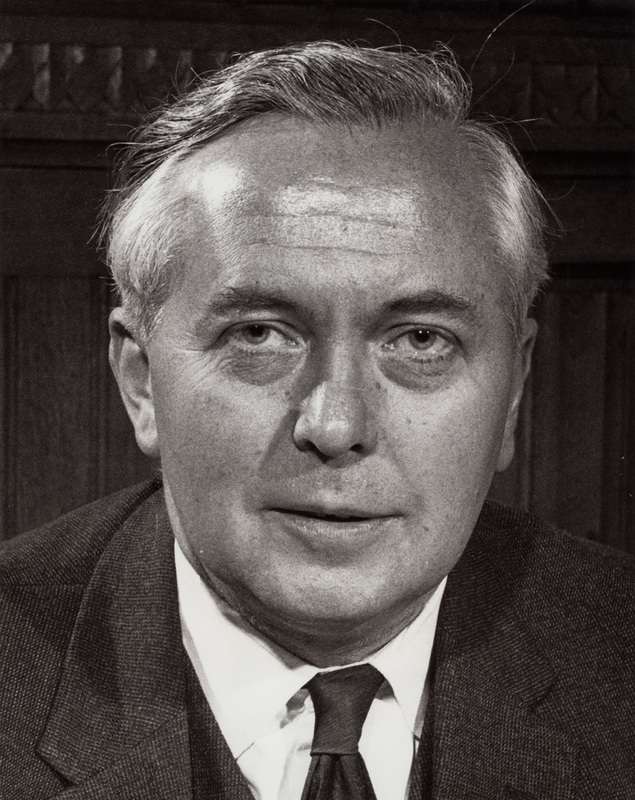
Harold Wilson, Labour Prime Minister of the United Kingdom from 1964 to 1970 and 1974 to 1976

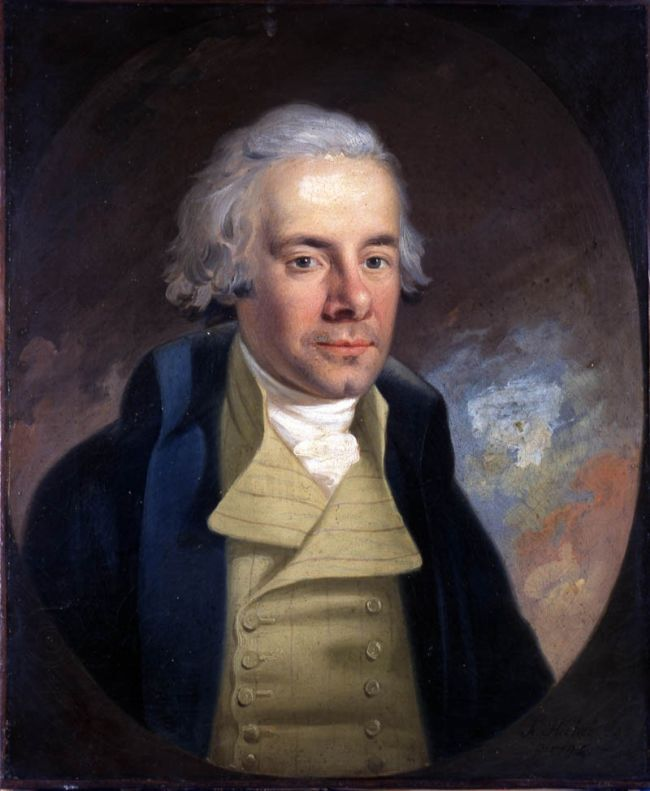
William Wilberforce

Name	Place	Life	Comments	Reference
H. H. Asquith	born in Morley	1852–1928	Prime Minister of the United Kingdom 1908–16	
William Bradford	born in Austerfield	1590–1657	Plymouth governor, pilgrim father	
Guy Fawkes	York	1570–1606	Yorkshire-born soldier, part of the Gunpowder Plot	
Roy Hattersley	born in Sheffield	1933–	British Labour politician, author and journalist	
Elizabeth Smith Middleton	born in Yorkshire	1814–1898	British-born Canadian temperance leader	
William Wilberforce	born in Kingston upon Hull	1759–1833	social campaigner who brought about the abolition of slavery	
Harold Wilson	born in Huddersfield	1916–1995	Prime Minister of the United Kingdom 1964–70 and 1974–76	

== Writers ==
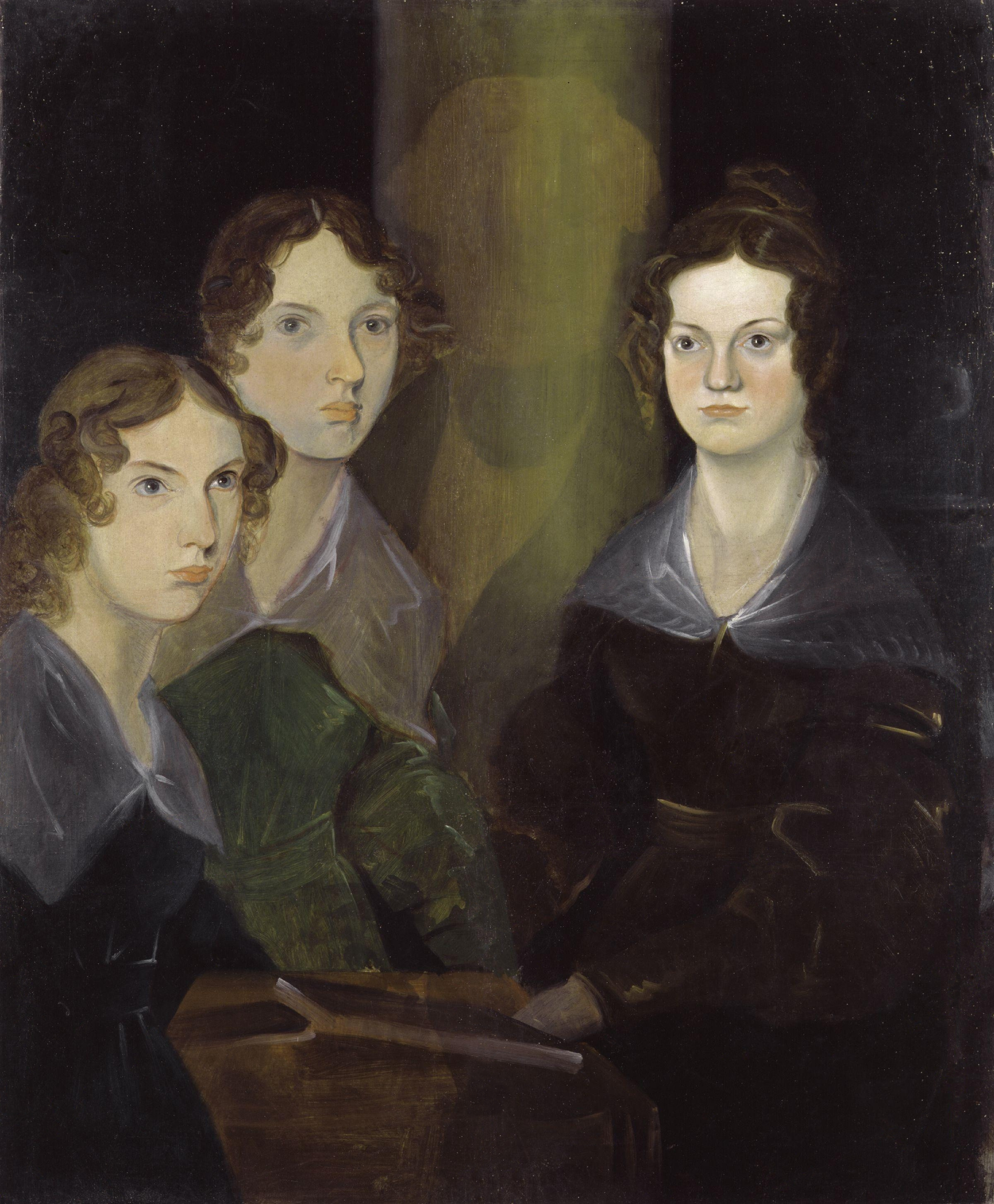
The Brontë Sisters

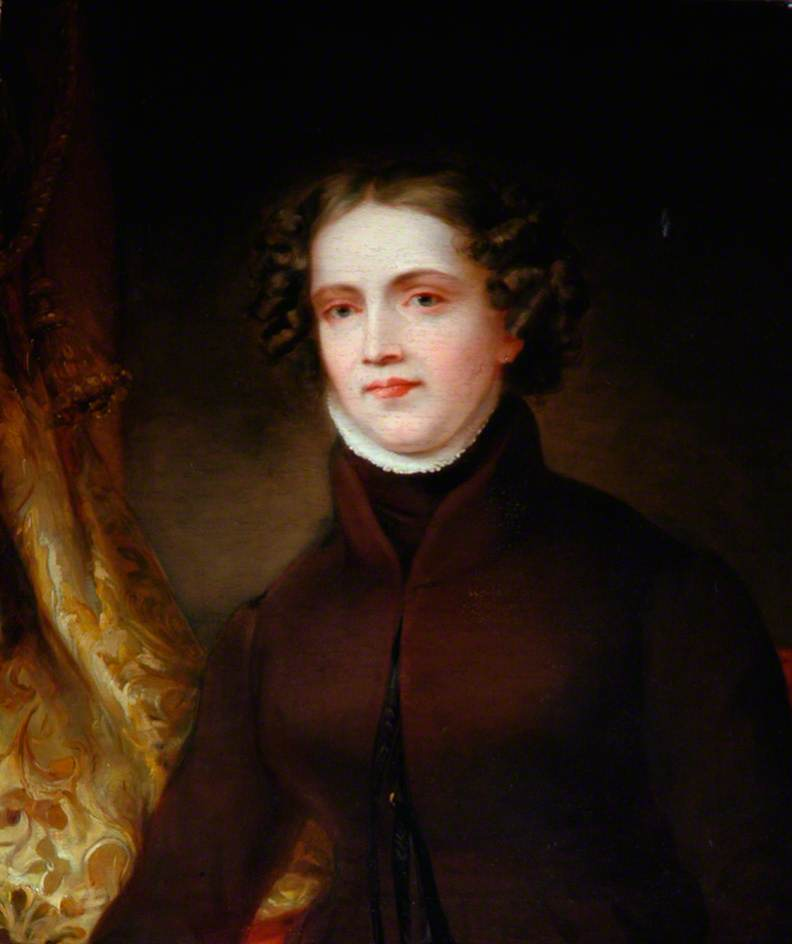
Anne Lister (1791–1840)

Name	Place	Life	Comments	Reference
Simon Armitage	born Huddersfield	1963–	Poet, writer	
W. H. Auden	born York	1907– 1973	Poet, critic, essayist	
Alcuin of York	born near York	732–804	Early Middle Ages scholar, ecclesiastic, poet and teacher	
Alan Bennett	born in Leeds	1934–	playwright and actor	
Barbara Taylor Bradford	born in Leeds	1933–	best-selling British-American novelist, debut novel, A Woman of Substance	
Anne Brontë	born in Thornton	1820–49	writer, author of The Tenant of Wildfell Hall	
Branwell Brontë	born in Thornton	1817–48	writer and artist	
Charlotte Brontë	born in Thornton	1816–55	writer, author of Jane Eyre	
Emily Brontë	born in Thornton	1818–48	writer, author of Wuthering Heights	
Cædmon	born Whitby	657–684	Earliest English poet	Bede's Historia ecclesiastica.
Ian Clayton	born in Featherstone	1959–	Writer and broadcaster	
Margaret Drabble	born in Sheffield	1939–	literary Prize-winning writer	
Stanley Ellis	born in Bradford	1926–2009	English linguistics scholar, writer and broadcaster, English regional dialects.	
Helen Fielding	born in Morley, West Yorkshire	1958–	novelist and screenwriter, Bridget Jones's Diary (1996), The Edge of Reason (1999)	
Roger Hargreaves	born in Cleckheaton	1935–1988	writer of the Mr. Men and Little Miss books	
Joanne Harris	born in Barnsley	1964–	English author, award-winning novel Chocolat	
Tony Harrison	born in Leeds	1964–	Poet, translator, critic, dramatist	
Susan Hill	born Scarborough, North Yorkshire	1942–	novels include The Woman in Black and I'm the King of the Castle, Somerset Maugham Award (1971). Commander of the Order of the British Empire (CBE) in 2012	
Barry Hines	born Hoyland Common near Barnsley	1939–2016	Novelist, television script-writer. A Kestrel for a Knave (1968), Kes	
Richard Hoggart	born in Potternewton, Leeds	1918–2014	Writer on English literature, sociology and cultural studies	
Winifred Holtby	Rudston, East Riding of Yorkshire	1898 - 1935	Novelist of works based on 1920-1930 Yorkshire women's empowerment, her works include South Riding, The Land of Green Ginger, A Crowded Street, Anderby Wold	
Ted Hughes	born in Mytholmroyd	1930–98	poet laureate of United Kingdom, 1984–1998.	
Anne Lister	born in Halifax, West Yorkshire	1791-1840	English landowner, diarist, and mountaineer.	
Andrew Marvell	born in Winestead-in-Holderness, East Riding of Yorkshire	1621–78	poet	
Ian McMillan	born in Darfield, South Yorkshire	1956–	poet	
Julie O'Neill		1971–	author	
J. B. Priestley	born in Bradford	1894–1984	writer, novelist and broadcaster	
Christopher Riley	born in Bridlington	1967–	Science and history writer and documentarian	
Ray Robinson	born in Northallerton	1971–	English novelist and screenwriter, award-winning novel Electricity	
Sally Wainwright	born in Huddersfield, Yorkshire	1963–	English television writer, producer, and director: Scott & Bailey (2011–2016), Last Tango in Halifax (2012–2016), Happy Valley (2014–present), and Gentleman Jack (2019–2022).	
Keith Waterhouse	born in Hunslet, Leeds	1929–2009	British novelist, newspaper columnist, many television series, novels: Billy Liar (1959)	
Stanley Wells	born in Hull	1930–	Shakespearean scholar, writer, professor and editor who has been honorary president of the Shakespeare Birthplace Trust, professor emeritus at the University of Birmingham	

== Saints ==
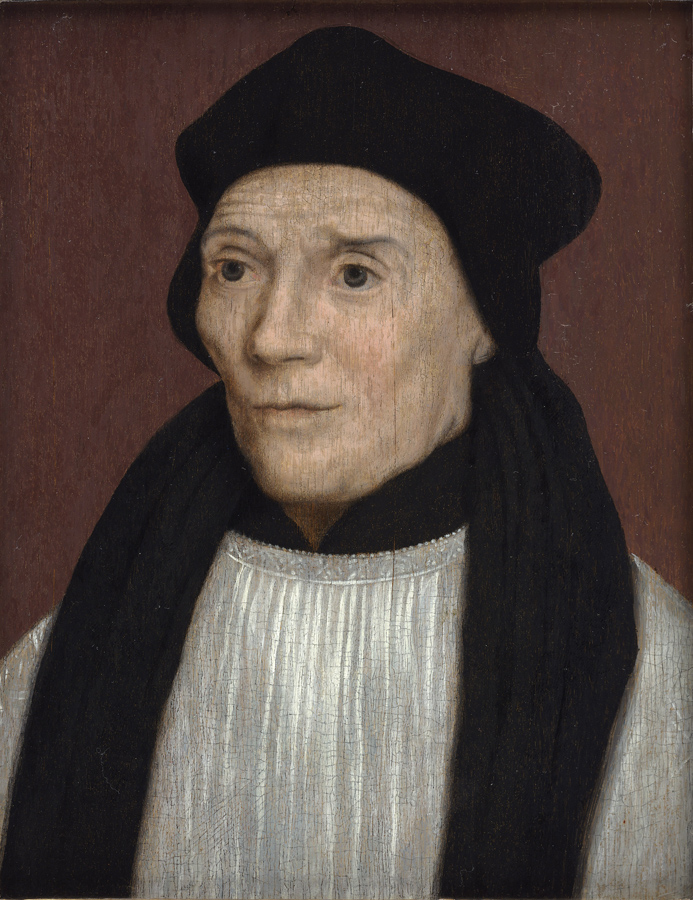
John Fisher

Name	Place	Life	Comments	Reference
Margaret Clitherow	born in York	1556–1586	saint, martyr	
Edwin of Northumbria	Not born in Yorkshire	585–633	saint, King of Northumbria	
John of Beverley	Harpham and Beverley	d. 721	bishop, founder and patron saint of Beverley	
John Fisher	Beverley	1469–1535	bishop, cardinal, saint, martyr	
Hilda of Whitby		614–680	princess, nun, nurse, founding abbess of Whitby Abbey and patron saint of Whitby	
Blessed Nicholas Postgate	Egton	1596–1679	martyr	

== Entertainers ==
=== Actors and actresses ===
Name	Place	Life	Comments	Reference
Mark Addy	York		actor	
Julian Barratt	Leeds		actor, comedian	
Keith Barron	Mexborough		actor	
Sean Bean	Sheffield	1959–	actor	
Brian Blessed	Mexborough	1936–	actor	
Chuckle Brothers	Rotherham	1944–2018, 1947–	TV actors	
Sir Tom Courtenay	Hull, East Riding		actor	
Dame Judi Dench	York		actress	
Peter Firth	Bradford		actor	
James Frain	Leeds		actor	
Brian Glover	Sheffield (raised in Barnsley)		actor, comedian	
Charlie Heaton	Bridlington	1994–	actor	
Elizabeth Henstridge	Sheffield	1987-	actress, model, fashion designer, YouTuber, podcaster and director	
Ralph Ineson	Leeds		actor	
Gorden Kaye	Huddersfield	1941–2017	Actor, comedian	
Sir Ben Kingsley	Scarborough		actor	
Charles Laughton	Scarborough	1899–1962	actor, screenwriter, and director of the film The Night of The Hunter	
Matthew Lewis	Leeds		actor	
James Mason	Huddersfield	1909–1984	actor	
Michael Palin	Sheffield	1943–	actor, comedian	
Andrew-Lee Potts	Bradford		actor	
Dame Diana Rigg	Doncaster	1938–2020	actress	
Jack Shepherd	Leeds		actor	
Peter O'Toole	Leeds		actor	
Sir Patrick Stewart	Mirfield	1940–2026	actor	
Laura White	Yorkshire	1996–	actress	
Liz White	Rotherham	1979–	actress	
Jodie Whittaker	Skelmanthorpe		actress	
Tom Wilkinson	Leeds		actor	
Austin Haynes	Leeds		actor	

=== Television performers ===
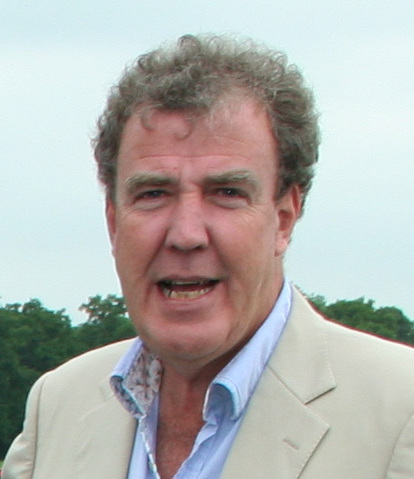
Jeremy Clarkson

Name	Place	Life	Comments	Reference
Jeremy Clarkson	Doncaster		presenter and former host of BBC TV's Top Gear	
Angela Crow	Wharfedale	1938–	actress	
Rodney Bewes	Bingley, Bradford	1937–2017	comedian, actor	
Ryan Swain (presenter)	North Yorkshire	1990–	television and radio presenter, DJ, motivational speaker and mental health campaigner	
Roy Castle	Scholes	1932–1994	comedian, singer, actor, television presenter	
Paul Daniels	South Bank, Middlesbrough	1938–2016	illusionist, quiz show host	
Adrian Edmondson	Bradford	1957–	comedian, actor	
Leigh Francis (Keith Lemon)	Beeston, Leeds	1973–	comedian, entertainer	
Frankie Howerd	York	1917–1992	comedian	
Gorden Kaye	Huddersfield	1941–2017	actor	
Bob Mortimer	Acklam, Middlesbrough	1959–	comedian, entertainer	
Wendy Richard	Middlesbrough	1943–2009	actress	
Paul Shane	Thrybergh, Rotherham	1940–2013	comedian, actor	
Mollie Sugden	Keighley	1922–2009	actress	
Dame Penelope Wilton	Scarborough	1946–	actress	
Ernie Wise	Bramley	1925–1999	comedian	

=== Musicians and bands ===
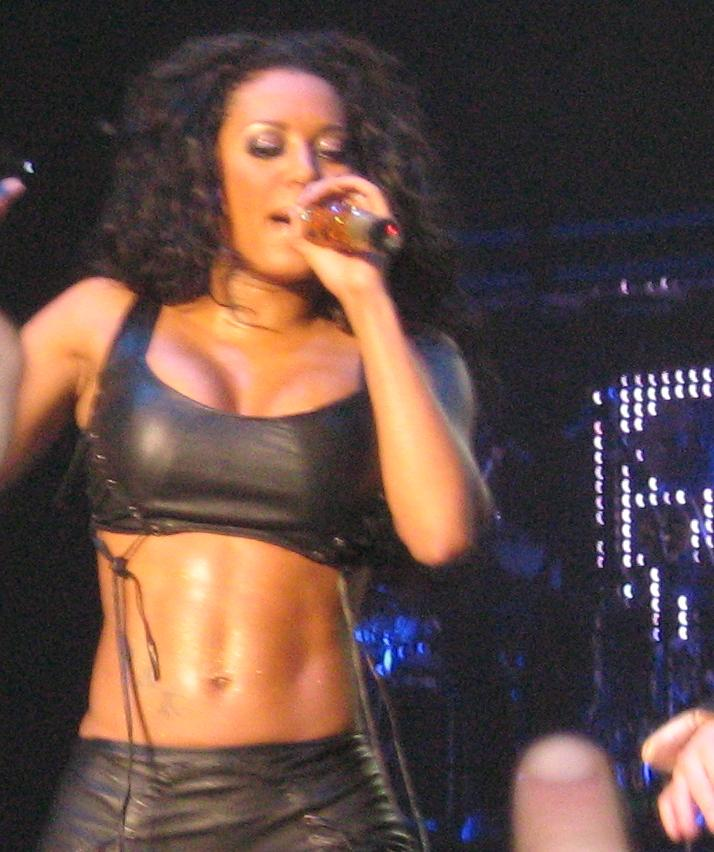
Mel B

Name	Place	Life	Comments	Reference
Arctic Monkeys	formed in Sheffield		indie band	
James Arthur	born in Middlesbrough	1988–	singer	
Asking Alexandria	formed in York		metalcore band	
Mel B	Leeds		member of the Spice Girls	
Dame Janet Baker			opera singer	
John Barry	York		best known for his soundtracks for James Bond films and Midnight Cowboy	
The Beautiful South	formed in Hull		popular music band	
Bring Me the Horizon	formed in Sheffield		metalcore band	
Arthur Brown			rock singer	
Tony Christie	Conisbrough		singer	
Joe Cocker	Sheffield		rock singer	
David Coverdale	born in Saltburn-by-the-Sea		lead vocalist for Deep Purple and Whitesnake	
The Cribs	formed in Wakefield		indie band	
Kiki Dee	Bradford		singer-songwriter	
Def Leppard	formed in Sheffield		hard rock group	
Frederick Delius	Bradford		composer	
Gang of Four	formed in Leeds		post-punk group	
Vin Garbutt	born in South Bank, Middlesbrough		folk singer	
Lesley Garrett	Doncaster		opera singer	
Gareth Gates	born in Bradford		singer	
Heaven 17			80s band	
The Human League	formed in Sheffield		synthpop band	
Kaiser Chiefs	formed in Leeds		indie band	
Zayn Malik	born in Bradford		Singer-songwriter and former member of boy band One Direction	
Jane McDonald	born in Wakefield		singer	
John McLaughin	born in Doncaster	1942–	jazz guitarist	
John Newman	born in Settle	1990–	soul singer	
Robert Palmer	Batley	1949–2003	singer	
Pulp	formed in Sheffield		popular music band	
Corinne Bailey Rae	born in Leeds		singer	
Chris Rea	born in Middlesbrough		singer	
Paul Rodgers	born in Middlesbrough	1949–	rock singer-songwriter, best known for his success in the 1970s as a member of Free and Bad Company	
Kate Rusby			folk singer	
Shed Seven	formed in York		indie-rock band	
Ed Sheeran	born in Hebden Bridge		singer	
Benson Taylor	born in Bradford		Composer	
Kimberley Walsh	born in Bradford		member of pop group Girls Aloud	
Chris Wolstenholme	born in Rotherham		bassist of Muse	
Louis William Tomlinson	born in Doncaster		Singer-songwriter and member of boy group One Direction, currently solo	
Dominic Harrison	born in Doncaster		Singer Yungblud	
Saxon	formed in Barnsley		Heavy Metal band part of the NWOBHM	

== Sport ==
Name	Place	Life	Comments	Reference
David Bairstow	born in Bradford, Yorkshire	1951 – January 1998	cricketer	
Jonathan Bairstow	born in Bradford	1989–	Yorkshire CCC and England cricketer and son of David. (Above)	
Gordon Banks	born in Sheffield	1937-2019	Goal keeper, England World Cup Winner 1966	
Geoffrey Boycott	born in Fitzwilliam	1940–	Yorkshire CCC and England cricketer	
Alistair Brownlee	born in Dewsbury	1988–	Olympic gold medalist, world champion in triathlon	
Jonathan Brownlee	born in Leeds	1990–	Olympic silver medalist, world champion in triathlon	
Brian Clough	born in Middlesbrough	1935–2004	footballer and football manager	
Jessica Ennis	born in Sheffield	1986–	Olympic gold medalist, world champion in heptathlon	
Lewis Cook	born in York	1997–	footballer, midfielder for AFC Bournemouth and England	
Josh Coburn	born in Bedale	2002-	footballer, formerly for Sunderland Football Club, current forward for Middlesbrough Football Club	
Ben Godfrey	born in York	1997–	footballer, defender/midfielder for Norwich City	
Darren Gough	born in Barnsley	1970–	cricketer	
Alan Hinkes		1954–	mountaineer, first Briton to climb world's highest 14 peaks	
Len Hutton	born in Pudsey	1916–90	cricketer, Ashes-winning captain	
Innes Ireland	born in Mytholmroyd		Formula One driver	
Kevin Keegan	born in Doncaster	1951–2026	footballer, 2 x European footballer of the year	
Harry Maguire	born in Sheffield	1993 –	football player for Manchester United and England	
Steve McClaren	born in York	1961–	football manager and former player	
Gerard Jones (football coach)	born in York	1989–	football manager and entrepreneur	
Jamie Reeves	born in Sheffield	1962–	world champion strength athlete, World's Strongest Man of '89	
Joe Root	Sheffield	1990	Cricketer for Yorkshire CCC and England	
David Seaman	born in Rotherham	1963	footballer, goalkeeper for Arsenal and England	
John Stones	born in Barnsley	1994–	footballer, Centre back, for Manchester City and England	
Jane Tomlinson		1964–2007	amateur athlete and cancer charity fundraiser	
Fred Trueman		1931 – July 2006	cricketer	
Jamie Vardy	born in Sheffield	1987–	footballer, striker for Leicester City and England	
Danny Willett	born in Sheffield	1987–	golfer, second Englishman to win The Masters	
Tom Pidcock	born in Leeds	1999–	cyclist, olympic champion	

== Artists and sculptors ==
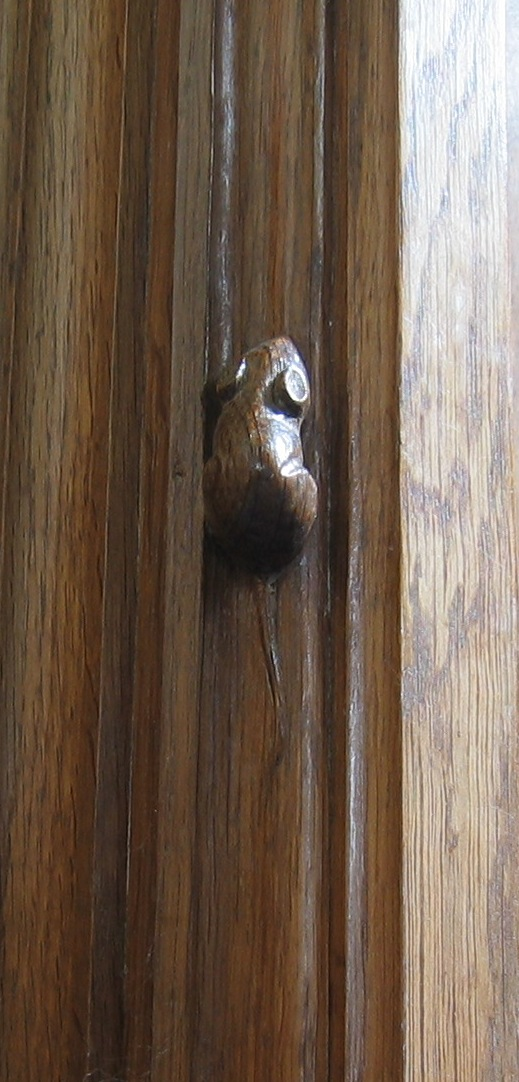
Furniture maker Robert Thompson's trademark mouse

Name	Place	Life	Comments	Reference
Gertrude Spurr Cutts	Scarborough	1858–1941	painter	
John Atkinson Grimshaw	Leeds	1836–1893	painter	
Barbara Hepworth	Wakefield	1903–1975	artist	
Alexander Keighley	Keighley	1861–1947	photographer	
David Hockney	Bradford	1937–2026	artist	
Henry Moore	Castleford	1898–1986	sculptor	
Robert Thompson	Kilburn	1876–1955	carpenter, furniture maker recognised for his mouseman furniture, exclusively using Yorkshire Oak	
Andy Goldsworthy	Cheshire, raised in Leeds	1956–	British sculptor, photographer and environmentalist producing site-specific sculpture and land art situated in natural and urban settings	
William Etty	York	1787–1849	English artist best known for his history paintings containing nude figures	
Damien Hirst	grew up in Leeds	1965–	artist	
Patrick Heron	Leeds	1920–1999	artist	
Trevor Bell	Leeds	1930–2017	artist	
Norman Ackroyd	Leeds	1938–	artist	
Ian Berry	Huddersfield	1984–	artist	
Joash Woodrow	Leeds	1927–2006	artist	
Jacob Kramer	Leeds based	1892–1962	artist	
Matthew Krishanu	Bradford	1980–	artist	
Pete McKee	Sheffield	1960–	artist	

== Crime ==
Name	Place	Life	Comments	Reference
Mary Bateman	born in Asenby, worked in Thirsk	1768–1809	"Yorkshire Witch"; convicted of fraud and murder, hanged	
John Christie	born in Illingworth	1899–1953 (Hanged)	serial killer, known as "The Rillington Place Strangler"	
Stephen Griffiths	born in Dewsbury	1969–	serial killer, known as "The Crossbow Cannibal"	
Mark Hobson	born in Wakefield	1969–	'spree killer' who murdered four people	
Donald Neilson	born in Dewsbury	1936–2011	armed robber, serial killer, known as "The Black Panther"	
Jimmy Savile	born in West Riding	1926–2011	Prolific sex abuser of both adults and children, TV presenter, celebrity, charity fund-raiser	
Edward Simpson	born in Sleights	1815–?	infamous forger of prehistoric flint tools, sold to many notable museums	
Peter Sutcliffe	born in Bingley	1946–2020	serial killer, known as "The Yorkshire Ripper"	

== People in fiction ==
- Dracula by Bram Stoker: A Russian ship, the Demeter, having weighed anchor at Varna, runs aground on the shores of Whitby, North Yorkshire, England, during a fierce tempest. Whitby continues to celebrate its link with Dracula, as well as its Victorian gothic past
- Beedle the Bard: In J. K. Rowling's Harry Potter wizarding world, he is the fictional author of The Tales of Beedle the Bard. Beedle was born in Yorkshire in the 15th century.
- Robinson Crusoe: The title character from the novel by Daniel Defoe is from York
- Robin Ellacott, Cormoran Strike's detective partner in the Cormoran Strike series by Robert Galbraith, was raised in Masham, North Yorkshire

== Others ==
- Thomas Wedders, circus sideshow performer.

== See also ==
- List of people from Kingston upon Hull
- List of people from Leeds
- List of people from Sheffield
- List of people from the East Riding of Yorkshire
- List of people from North Yorkshire
- List of people from South Yorkshire
- List of people from West Yorkshire
- List of Yorkshire County Cricket Club players
