= List of people from Kingston upon Hull =

List of notable people from Hull, England

This is a list of people from Kingston upon Hull in the north-east of England with a Wikipedia page. Groups and sub-groups are in alphabetical order; persons likewise.

== Arts and humanities ==
=== Architecture ===
- George Frederick Bodley
- Cuthbert Brodrick
- Alfred Gelder, architect and five-times mayor of Hull

=== Education ===
- James Evans, Hull-born missionary and amateur linguist; best remembered for his creation of the "syllabic" writing system for Ojibwe and Cree, later adapted to other languages such as Inuktitut
- Margaret Kissling, missionary to Sierra Leone and New Zealand
- Joseph Malet Lambert (1853–1931), author, Canon of York, Chairman of Hull University Board, educationalist, social reformer

== Entertainment ==
- John Alderton, actor, grew up in Hull and attended Kingston High School
- Lucy Beaumont (Cornwall born) award-winning stand-up comedian and comedy writer starred at the Edinburgh Fringe Festival in 2012 and wrote the Radio 4 comedy To Hull & Back, starring herself and Maureen Lipman.
- Joseph Caley, ballet dancer, currently lead principal with the English National Ballet and formerly principal with Birmingham Royal Ballet
- Ian Carmichael, actor, born in Hull
- Sir Tom Courtenay, actor, star of stage, film and TV; graduate of RADA and honorary graduate of the University of Hull
- Robert Crampton, Times journalist, grew up in Hull
- Liam Garrigan, former student of Wyke College and Northern Theatre Company, star of TV dramas Casualty, The Chase and Agatha Christie's Marple, was born and raised in Hull.
- Liam Gerrard, BAFTA nominated film, TV and theatre actor was born and raised in Hull. Films include Peterloo, Death Defying Acts and Walter Tull: Britain's First Black Officer
- Amy Gledhill Hull born comedian and actress, nominated for Best Show at the UK National Comedy Awards and Best Show and Best Newcomer at the Edinburgh Fringe Festival. One half of comedian duo, The Delightful Sausage.
- Gareth Hale, half of the comedy duo Hale and Pace, was born in Hull.
- Vanessa Hooper, former dancer with the Royal Ballet and Northern Ballet Theatre, now a senior examiner, lecturer and committee member of the IDTA
- Michael Jibson, actor, grew up in Hessle and attended Hessle High School; originated the role of Joe Casey in the West End Musical Our House; has worked in film, TV and theatre; films include The Bank Job and Les Misérables
- Andrew Lincoln, actor, spent some time growing up in Hull
- Maureen Lipman, film, theatre and television actress, columnist, and comedian
- Derren Litten, actor, writer, Benidorm
- Dorothy Mackaill, motion picture actress
- Peter Martin, best known for playing Joe Carroll in The Royle Family and Len Reynolds in ITV's Emmerdale
- Jordan Metcalfe, actor, known as Adil the Genie in Nickelodeon's Genie in the House and Brian in Misfits
- Liam Mower, dancer and actor, famous for originating the title role in Billy Elliot the Musical and being the youngest person ever to win an Olivier Award for Best Actor for the role
- Andy Newton-Lee, actor
- Roy North, actor and TV presenter best known for his appearances as Mr Roy in 1970s children's show Basil Brush
- Gemma Oaten (born 8 May 1984 in Hull) actress who has starred in Doctors and who is best known as Rachel Breckle in Emmerdale from July 2011 until 2015. Appeared on Celebrity Dinner Date in 2016.
- Paul Popplewell, film, TV and theatre award-winning actor, attended school in Hull.
- Barrie Rutter (b. 1946), actor, director, and founder of Northern Broadsides
- Gavin Scott, novelist, broadcaster and film/TV writer best known for writing Small Soldiers, The Borrowers and The Young Indiana Jones Chronicles
- Reece Shearsmith, actor and writer, famous as a member of The League of Gentlemen
- Debra Stephenson, actress, comedian and impressionist born in Hull, star of TV dramas Bad Girls and Coronation Street
- Oliver Stokes, actor who plays Michael Garvey in Benidorm
- Isy Suttie, stand up comedian, writer, and actress; born in Hull; known for the role of Dobby in the British sitcom Peep Show
- Gerald Thomas, director of the Carry On films
- Norman Collier, comedian, best known for his 'faulty microphone' routine and for his chicken impressions was born and raised in Hull

=== Literature ===
- Richard Bean, playwright
- Emma Scarr Booth, 19th-century writer
- Lettice Galbraith, 19th-century ghost story writer
- John Godber, playwright; Artistic Director of the Hull Truck Theatre Company, 1984–2011
- Martin Goodman, writer
- Philip Larkin, Coventry-born poet, lived in Hull for most of his life as resident librarian at Hull University
- Ted Lewis, author of Jack's Return Home, later filmed as Get Carter, attended Hull School of Art
- Andrew Marvell, 17th-century metaphysical poet
- William Mayne, children's writer
- Sir Andrew Motion, Poet Laureate, taught English at the University of Hull (1976–1980)
- Alan Plater, playwright and screenwriter, worked extensively in British television from the 1960s to the 2000s; moved to Hull as a child
- Stevie Smith, poet and novelist best known for her poem "Not Waving but Drowning"
- Amy Catherine Walton, children's writer
- Stanley Wells, Shakespeare scholar

=== Music ===
- Trevor Bolder, bass player for David Bowie, The Spiders From Mars, Uriah Heep, and Wishbone Ash.
- Patricia Bredin, singer; UK's first entry to Eurovision Song Contest in 1957 with "All"; starred in a number of films in the 1950s and 1960s.
- Norman Cook (also known as Fatboy Slim), moved to Hull in the 1980s and became a member of indie pop band The Housemartins.
- Dave Hemingway, born and raised in Hull, drummer with the Housemartins and went on to form The Beautiful South with Paul Heaton.
- John Bacchus Dykes, 19th-century hymnist, composer of the popular maritime hymn "Eternal Father, Strong to Save"
- Everything but the Girl, band formed by Tracey Thorn and Ben Watt whilst they were students at Hull University.
- Roland Gift, lead singer of Fine Young Cannibals, grew up in the city and attended Kelvin Hall Secondary School
- Paul Heaton, musician in The Beautiful South
- Jonathan Dowsland, professor of computer science, information technology who acquired a degree in music. He has developed the – "Jonathan Downsland Timer App" app
- Ronnie Hilton, British crooner whose chart hits included the UK number one hit "No Other Love"
- Alfred Hollins, composer and international concert organist, born in Hull in 1865.
- Rob Hubbard, composer, known for computer game theme music, especially for 1980s microcomputers such as the Commodore 64, which showcased the potential of the Commodore 64's sound hardware and gave examples of how music can improve a gaming experience.
- Richard Justice (died 1757), composer, harpsichordist, and organist
- Kingmaker, Indie band formed by three Hull-born musicians including John Andrew, had UK Top 40 singles in the late 1980s and the early 1990s, but split in 1995.
- Joe Longthorne, singer known for impersonating Shirley Bassey
- Lene Lovich, US-born pupil at Greatfield High School, found fame on the Stiff Label in the late 1970s, with a No. 3 hit with "Lucky Number"
- The Paddingtons, Indie band from Hull which had two UK Top 40 singles in 2005: "Panic Attack" (No. 25) and "50 To The Pound" (No. 32).
- Henry Priestman, record producer and singer/songwriter for the 1980s hit band The Christians.
- Mick Ronson, guitarist, known for work with David Bowie, hailed from Hull.
- Spacemaid, britpop group, formed in 1992
- Cosey Fanni Tutti, founding member of industrial band Throbbing Gristle, formed the performance art group COUM Transmissions in Hull with Genesis P-Orridge, while attending the university from 1969–1971. It changed its name to Throbbing Gristle in 1976 after moving to London.
- Gay-Yee Westerhoff, Hull-born Chinese/English cellist of the all-female string quartet Bond
- David Whitfield, 1950s male tenor vocalist, the UK's most successful male singer in the US in the pre-rock years, still one of only six artists to spend ten or more consecutive weeks at No. 1 on the UK Singles Chart
- Calum Scott, Hull-born singer known for a Britain's Got Talent appearance and a cover of Robyn's Dancing On My Own that reached No. 2 on the UK Singles Chart
- Scarlet, 1990s female duo of Cheryl Parker and Jo Youle, formed in Hull, with UK hits in 1995 with "Independent Love Song" (No. 12) and with "I Wanna Be Free To Be With Him" (No. 21). "Love Hangover" and "Bad Girl" both peaked at No. 54. They released two albums, Naked and Chemistry.
- Infant Annihilator, a technical deathcore band formed in 2012, known for their extreme musical style and controversial lyrical themes.

=== Visual arts ===
- Henry Dawson, 19th-century landscape painter, born in Hull
- John Ward, early 19th-century painter of marine seascapes

== Politics ==
- William de la Pole (Chief Baron of the Exchequer) (d. 1386), first Mayor of the city
- His son Michael de la Pole, 1st Earl of Suffolk (c. 1330 – 5 September 1389)
- Sir John Hotham, 1st Baronet (c. July 1589 – 3 January 1645), Governor of the city who denied Charles I entry in 1642
- Andrew Marvell (31 March 1621 – 16 August 1678), poet, MP for the city, and friend of John Milton
- John Ducker (1932–2005), member of the New South Wales Legislative Assembly; president of the New South Wales branch of the Australian Labor Party, 1972–1979
- Thomas Ferens (1847–1930), politician, philanthropist, and industrialist; MP for Hull East for 13 years; served the city as a justice of the peace and as High Steward
- John Hall, former Prime Minister of New Zealand
- John Prescott, Welsh-born former Deputy Prime Minister of the United Kingdom (1997–2007); MP and resident of Hull East since 1970; however, he was born in Wales and identifies as Welsh.
- Harry Pursey, politician and MP for Hull East 1945–1970
- William Wilberforce, instrumental in the abolition of slavery

== Science and scholarship ==
=== Biology ===
- Thomas Frederick Cheeseman (1845–1923), New Zealand botanist

=== Chemistry ===
- George William Gray, Hull University professor who first discovered cyanobiphenyl liquid crystals (which had correct stability and temperature properties for application in liquid crystal display technology
- George S. Whitby (1887–1972) was the head of the University of Akron rubber laboratory and for many years was the only person in the United States who taught rubber chemistry.

=== Computer science ===
- Rob Miles, Microsoft MVP

=== Geology ===
- Alfred Harker, petrologist

=== History ===
- A. G. Dickens, historian of the English Reformation
- Alex J. Kay (born 1979), historian
- Philip Sugden (1947–2014), historian

=== Mathematics ===
- Ernest William Brown, mathematician and astronomer
- Keith Devlin, mathematician and popular science writer
- John Venn, mathematician, born in Hull in 1834; responsible for the Venn diagram

=== Physics ===
- Edward Arthur Milne, astrophysicist and mathematician.

=== Physiology and medicine ===
- Stephen C. West, biochemist and molecular biologist.

== Sports ==
- Nick Barmby, former Hull City A.F.C. winger and manager
- Luke Campbell, Olympic champion who earned a gold medal in boxing at the London 2012 Summer Olympics and current Mayor of Hull and East Riding Combined Authority
- Tommy Coyle (born 1989), challenger for British super-lightweight title and Commonwealth lightweight title holder
- Stanley Gene, rugby league player (retired 2008) who has made East Hull his home for many years
- Tony Green, sports commentator and television presenter
- Lewis Harris, rugby league player
- Jack Harrison, rugby league footballer and posthumous Victoria Cross recipient
- Willie Intin, cricketer
- Damian Johnson, BBC Sports broadcaster and journalist
- Philip Kedward, cricketer
- Julia Lee, first female rugby league referee
- Colin McLocklan (born 1952), footballer
- Ebenezer Cobb Morley (1831–1924), sportsman regarded as the "father" of The Football Association and modern Association football
- Katie O'Brien, born in Beverley, 5 miles (8 km) from Hull, tennis player,
- Verity Smith, transgender rugby player
- Clive Sullivan, rugby league player, played for both of Hull's rugby league teams. The main road into Hull from the Humber Bridge is named Clive Sullivan Way after him.
- Carol Thomas, former England Women’s Football Captain
- Dean Windass, had two spells with Hull City and scored the goal that helped the club to promotion to the top flight of English football for the first time in its history.

== Other ==
- Henry Wolsey Bayfield, British naval officer and surveyor who charted thousands of Canadian Islands. Bayfield, Wisconsin, is named after him.
- Lillian Bilocca, British fisheries worker and campaigner for improved safety in fishing fleet as leader of the "headscarf revolutionaries"
- Joseph Boxhall, British merchant sailor and naval officer; Fourth officer and survivor of the sinking of RMS Titanic
- Sarah Cruddas International Space Journalist, Author and TV Host on Discovery Channel
- Ronald Dearing, Baron Dearing, senior civil servant; Chairman and Chief Executive of the Post Office Ltd
- "Gassy Jack" John Deighton, founder of Gastown, precursor to modern-day Vancouver, BC, Canada
- Michelle Dewberry, winner of the second British series of reality TV show The Apprentice, business woman and Sky News presenter
- Sir John Ellerman, shipping tycoon of Ellerman Lines fame; reputedly the richest man in Britain during his lifetime
- John Fearn, whaler and first European to visit Nauru.
- Joseph James Forrester, wine shipper and businessman
- James Hall (unknown, Hull – 1612, Greenland), explorer in the service of the Danish King
- Charles M. Jacobs (1850–1919), civil engineer primarily known for his tunneling work in the United States.
- Amy Johnson, aviator; born on St Georges Road in West Hull, attended Kingston High School
- Zachariah Pearson (1821–1891), shipowner, today known for his gift of land to Hull, which was used to establish the City's first public park, later known as Pearson Park
- Jim Radford (born 1928), folk singer, shantyman, peace campaigner, former housing activist, youngest known participant in the Allied invasion of Normandy in 1944
- J. Arthur Rank, 1st Baron Rank (1888–1972), industrialist and film producer; founder of the Rank Organisation, now known as The Rank Group Plc
- Joseph Rank (1854–1943), founder of Rank Hovis McDougall, one of the UK's largest flour-milling businesses
- Sir Harold Reckitt, 2nd Baronet (1868–1930)
- Sir James Reckitt, 1st Baronet (1833–1924)
- Yasmina Siadatan, winner of the fifth British series of reality TV show The Apprentice
- Henry Brarens Sloman (1848–1931), English-German entrepreneur who emigrated first to Hamburg, Germany, and then to Chile, where he established a saltpetre business. He was listed as Hamburg's richest man in 1912.
- William Traynor, recipient of the Victoria Cross
- Dave Ulliott (also known as Devilfish), Hall of Fame poker player and World Series of Poker bracelet-winner.

== See also ==
- Alumni of the University of Hull
