= List of people from South Yorkshire =

The list of people from South Yorkshire, in northern England, is divided by metropolitan borough. South Yorkshire is a metropolitan county created in 1974 and so people from the area before this year were from the earlier West Riding of Yorkshire.

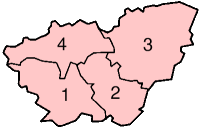
1. Sheffield
2. Rotherham
3. Doncaster
4. Barnsley
