= List of people from Rotherham =

This is a list of people from Rotherham who have become known internationally in different roles and professions. Rotherham is a town in South Yorkshire, England. Historically within the West Riding of Yorkshire, Rotherham is 6 miles (10 km) from Sheffield City Centre and is surrounded by several smaller settlements which together form the Metropolitan Borough of Rotherham, which together also form part of the Sheffield urban area.

== Renowned people from Rotherham ==
- Baron Ahmed, politician
- Dean Andrews, actor.
- David Artell, footballer.
- Donald Bailey (1901–1985), civil engineer.
- Gordon Banks, footballer.
- Nick Banks, musician
- Ian Breckin, footballer.
- Stephen Brogan (born 1988), footballer.
- Frank Brown (born 1890), footballer.
- Bill Burgess (1872–1950), channel swimmer.
- Jo Callis, musician.
- Herbert Chapman (1878–1934), football manager.
- Chuckle Brothers, comedians.
- Avis Dolphin, survivor of the RMS Lusitania sinking, born in Rotherham.
- Felicia Dorothea Kate Dover, arsenic poisoner, lived and died in Rotherham after her release from prison.
- Dean Downing, cyclist
- Russell Downing, cyclist
- Ebenezer Elliott, poet
- Peter Elliott, athlete
- Scott Flinders, footballer
- Charles Sydney Gibbes, tutor and monk
- Dave Godin, anarchist and musicologist
- Paul Goodison, Olympic gold medal-winning sailor
- Justine Greening, politician
- Simon Guy, cricketer
- William Hague, former leader of the Conservative Party
- Matt Hamshaw, footballer
- Paul Harrison, racing driver
- Edward Heppenstall, theologian
- Alan Hodgkinson, former England national football team goalkeeper
- Daniel Howell, research scientist
- Joe Hunter, cricketer
- Alf Lee English professional footballer
- Daisy Makeig-Jones, sculptor
- David Miedzianik, poet
- Laurie Millsom, footballer
- Simon Mottram, entrepreneur
- Matt Nicholls, musician
- Lynne Perrie, actress
- Duggie Brown, Comedian, brother of Lynn Perry
- Gervase Phinn, author
- Frederick Brian Pickering, metallurgist
- Sandy Powell, comedian
- Katherine Raleigh, classicist, suffragist and tax resister
- Chris Rawlinson, athlete
- Frazer Richardson, footballer
- Archbishop Thomas Rotherham, cleric and minister
- Colin Rowe, professor of architecture
- Ryan Sampson, actor
- Bishop Robert Sanderson, minister and logician
- David Seaman, former England national football team goalkeeper
- Jack P. Shepherd, Coronation Street actor
- Paul Shane, comedian
- Ernie Stevenson, footballer
- Ben Swift, cyclist
- Rebecca Lucy Taylor, musician
- Trevor Taylor, motor racing driver
- Michael Turley, footballer
- Raymond Unwin, town planner
- Colin Walker, footballer
- Michael Walsh, footballer
- Howard Webb, football referee
- Liz White, actress
- Chris Wolstenholme, musician
