= Wedder =

A wedder or wedders refer to married person(s). It may also refer to:

- Wether Holm (disambiguation), several of the Shetland Islands, Scotland
- Thomas Wedders
- Gustav Weder, Swiss bobsledder
- shortening of Wedderborg
