= List of people from Barnsley =

This is a list of people from Barnsley, a town in South Yorkshire, England. This list is arranged alphabetically by surname:

== A ==
- John Arden (1930–2012), playwright
- Maggie Atkinson, the Children's Commissioner for England

== B ==
- Alan Barton (1953–1995), singer
- Josh Bates (1996–), professional speedway rider
- Neil Alan Bell (1978–), Actor
- Mark Beevers (1989–), footballer, Peterborough United, formerly Sheffield Wednesday, Millwall, Bolton Wanderers
- Mike Betts (1956–), retired professional footballer
- Dickie Bird (1933–2025), international cricket umpire
- Gavin Blair (1961-), writer and creator of animated TV show ReBoot
- Dai Bradley, actor, Billy Casper in Ken Loach's film Kes
- Joseph Bramah (1748–1814), inventor of flushing water closet, Bramah lock and the beer pump
- Pete Brown (1968–), beer writer and columnist
- Stan Burton (1912–1977), former Wolverhampton Wanderers player, played in 1939 FA Cup Final

== C ==
- John Casken (1949-), composer
- Ed Clancy (1985–), professional cyclist
- Tom Clare (1999–), a footballer and television contestant on 2023 Love Island series nine.
- Jay Clayton (1990-), Musician and songwriter in the band Crywank
- Wilf Copping (1909–1980), footballer, played for England 20 times
- Simon Corrigan (1964–) Author of Tommy Was Here.
- Mark Crossley (1969–), former Nottingham Forest, Fulham and Sheffield Wednesday and Chesterfield goalkeeper.
- Nick Crowe (1968–), artist

== D ==
- Shaun Dooley, actor
- Scott Doonican, comedy folk-musician - lead vocalist/guitarist with The Bar-Steward Sons of Val Doonican
- Kenny Doughty, actor
- John Duttine (1949–), actor

== E ==
- Leonard Knight Elmhirst (1893–1974), philanthropist
- Air Marshal Sir Thomas Elmhirst (1895–1982), Commander-in-Chief Royal Indian Air Force, Lieutenant-Governor and Commander-in-Chief of Guernsey
- Bethany England, (1994-), English footballer, 2019/2020 Player of the Year, plays for Chelsea in the FA WSL and England

== F ==
- Joann Fletcher, Egyptologist
- Toby Foster, Radio Sheffield presenter, comedian and actor

== G ==
- Brian Glover (1934–1997), actor
- Darren Gough (1970–), cricketer
- Brian Greenhoff (1953–2013), footballer, Manchester United and Leeds United
- Jimmy Greenhoff (1946–), footballer, Manchester United and Leeds United

== H ==
- Alan Hill (footballer, born 1943) (1943-), footballer
- Charlie Hardcastle (1894–1960), boxer
- Joanne Harris (1964–), novelist, Chocolat
- Paul Heckingbottom (1977–), born in Barnsley, an English former footballer, played for Barnsley 2006–2008, and was the team manager from 2016–2018.
- Barry Hines (1939 - 2016), author of A Kestrel for a Knave, among other works.
- David Hirst (1967–), England international footballer, played for Barnsley before joining Sheffield Wednesday
- Stephanie Hirst (1976–), radio presenter, former host of hit40uk on commercial radio throughout the UK
- Geoff Horsfield (1973–), professional footballer turned coach
- Alan Hydes (1947-), International table tennis player and 4 times Commonwealth gold medal winner
- Dorothy Hyman (1941–), sprinter

== I ==
- Graham Ibbeson, sculptor, artist, responsible for statue outside NUM Head Offices, Barnsley, and Eric Morecambe statue in Morecambe

== J ==
- Ashley Jackson, artist
- Admiral of the Fleet, Sir Henry Bradwardine Jackson (1855–1929), GCB, FRS, first Sea Lord, 1915–1916; pioneer of ship to ship wireless technology
- Milly Johnson (1964–), author
- Mark Jones (1933–1958), one of the eight Manchester United players killed in the Munich air disaster

== K ==
- Katherine Kelly (1980–present), actress, played Becky Granger in ITV soap opera Coronation Street
- James Kitchenman (1825-1909), carpet manufacturer

== L ==
- Ethel Lang (1900–2015), supercentenarian
- Davey Lawrence (1985–), ice hockey netminder playing for the Sheffield Steelers
- Joseph Locke (1805–1860), civil engineer
- Stephen Lodge (1952–), former Premier League referee; retired from top-flight officiating at the end of the 2000–01 season

== M ==
- Danny Malin, (1980–), Internet celebrity and food reviewer
- Baron Mason of Barnsley (1924–2015), former Northern Ireland Secretary
- John Mayock (1970–), former 1500m runner, member of Team GB, 3000m gold medallist at the 1998 European Athletics Indoor Championships
- Mick McCarthy (1959–), footballer, manager of Ipswich Town F.C. and Republic of Ireland national football team (1996–2002, 2018–)
- Paul McCue (1958–), author and military historian
- David McLintock (1930–2003), philologist and German translator
- Ian McMillan (1956–), the Bard of Barnsley
- CJ de Mooi, former panellist on quiz show Eggheads
- Chris Morgan (1977–), ex-professional football player; formerly played for the town's football club; now a coach at Sheffield United
- Martyn Moxon (1960–), cricketer who played for Yorkshire and played in 10 test matches for England
- Jenni Murray (1950–), journalist and broadcaster, current presenter of Woman's Hour on BBC Radio 4

== N ==
- Sam Nixon (1986–), came 3rd on Pop Idol 2003; singer and television co-host
- Victoria Nixon, model and writer

== O ==
- Richard O'Dwyer, university student, creator of TV Shack; in the process of extradition to the US on charges of conspiracy to commit copyright infringement and criminal infringement of copyright
- Craig Oldham (born 1985), designer
- Julie O'Neill, novelist. Born in Staincross in 1971.

== P ==
- Jon Parkin (1981–), professional footballer, playing for York City F.C.; nicknamed 'The Beast'
- Michael Parkinson (1935–2023), talk show host, journalist and television presenter

== R ==
- William Rayner (1929-2006), novelist
- Stan Richards (1930–2005), actor
- Danny Rose (1993–), football player for Northampton Town, previously played for Barnsley, Bury and Mansfield Town.
- Kate Rusby (1973–), folk singer
- Oliver Rowland (1992-), racecar driver

== S ==
- Mary Sadler, Lady Sadler (1852–1931), heiress and hostess
- Arthur Scargill (1938–), leader of the National Union of Mineworkers, 1981-2000; founded the Socialist Labour Party in 1996, currently the party's leader
- Callum Simpson (1996–), British professional boxer. He holds the British and Commonwealth super middleweight titles from August 2024.
- Harry Leslie Smith (1923–2018), author of Harry's Last Stand (2014), and autobiographical works.
- Danielle Steers (1991–) English stage actress and singer-songwriter
- John Stones, (1994–), English footballer, currently plays for Manchester City and England national football team.

== T ==
- James Hudson Taylor (1832–1905), Protestant Christian missionary to China; founder of the China Inland Mission (now OMF International)
- Tommy Taylor (1932–1958), professional footballer, one of the 'Busby Babes' (or Manchester United under the management of Matt Busby) who was killed in the Munich air disaster

== W ==
- Obadiah Walker (1616–1699), academic and Master of University College, Oxford from 1676 to 1688
- Charlie Williams (1928–2006), ex-professional footballer and stand-up comedian
- David Williams (born 1948), cricketer
- Harry Worth (1917–1989), actor, comedian and ventriloquist
- Celia Wray (1872-1954), architect and suffragette
