= List of people from Doncaster =

Notable people from Doncaster, South Yorkshire, England

This is a list of people from Doncaster, in South Yorkshire, England, and includes people from the town of Doncaster and the wider Metropolitan Borough of Doncaster, which encompasses Mexborough, Conisbrough, Thorne and Finningley. This list is arranged alphabetically by surname.

== A ==
- Thomas Aldham, early Quaker
- Dave Allen, boxer
- Louise Armstrong, feminist author
- Mark Atkins, footballer

== B ==
- Douglas Bader, fighter pilot who continued to fly after losing his legs (born in London but brought up in Sprotborough)
- Jessica Baglow, actress who played Lucy Snow in Where the Heart Is and Karla Bentham on BBC drama series Waterloo Road
- Lee Beevers, Walsall F.C. professional footballer, ex-Lincoln City F.C., Boston United F.C. and Colchester United F.C. player
- John Francis Bentley, church architect, most famous for Westminster Cathedral
- Rodney Bickerstaffe, past leader of UNISON and former president of the Pensioners' National Convention; brought up and educated in Doncaster
- Brian Blessed (born 1936), Mexborough-born TV and film actor
- Liam Botham, rugby player and cricketer; son of cricketer Ian Botham
- Billy Bremner, professional international footballer for Scotland and manager; born in Stirling (Scotland), but later lived and died in Doncaster
- Oliver Bridgewood (born 1985), cycling journalist
- Chris Brown (born 1984), professional footballer
- Steve Burton (born 1983), professional footballer
- Andy Butler, professional footballer

== C ==
- Anthony Card, first-class cricketer
- Emma Chambers, TV, film and stage actress
- Tony Christie, singer and musical performer; born in Conisbrough, outside Doncaster
- Roy Clarke, scriptwriter, Keeping Up Appearances, Open All Hours and Last of the Summer Wine
- Jeremy Clarkson, journalist and television presenter
- Thomas Crapper, credited with popularising the modern flush toilet

== D ==
- Richard Dawson, England test cricket player
- Mella Dee, born Ryan Aitchison, DJ and music producer
- Neil Dudgeon, television actor
- Sir Patrick Duffy, former Labour MP for Sheffield Attercliffe and Colne Valley, grew up in Rossington and lived in Doncaster
- Michael Dugher, former Labour MP for Barnsley East and Vice-Chair of the Labour Party

== F ==
- John Field, ballet dancer, choreographer and director with Royal Ballet; founder artistic director of Birmingham Royal Ballet
- David Firth, animator, best known for his work using Flash animation tools, e.g. in the Salad Fingers series
- Caroline Flint, Former Don Valley Labour MP and minister of state for Europe; lives in Sprotborough
- Tan France, English fashion designer and television personality

== G ==
- Lesley Garrett, singer from Thorne, Doncaster
- Margo Gunn, actress in Taggart, Doctor Finlay and Coronation Street
- Beau Greaves, darts player

== H ==
- William Hague, "Iron Hague", Mexborough-born champion boxer
- Kelly Harrison, actress from BBC Casualty series
- Mike Hawthorn, Formula One World Champion
- Joe Harvey, Edlington-born player and manager of Newcastle United F. C.
- Darius Henderson, born in Sutton, London, but raised in Doncaster, professional footballer
- Sam Hird, ex-Doncaster Rovers and current Chesterfield FC player
- Thomas Howes, actor, best known as William in ITV's Downton Abbey
- Kevin Hughes (died 2006), member of Parliament
- Benjamin Huntsman, inventor and steel manufacturer
- Brett Hutton, cricketer
- Graham Hyde, professional footballer and manager

== J ==
- India Jordan – electronic music producer and DJ

== K ==
- Kevin Keegan, Armthorpe-born, professional international footballer and manager of the England national football team
- Lindsey Kelk, writer of the "I heart" chick lit series

== L ==
- Shelley Longworth, comedy actress, known for playing Sam in Series 4–5 of the ITV comedy drama Benidorm
- Richard Lumb, First-class cricketer
- Carl Lygo, Vice-Chancellor of BPP University; Director of Doncaster Rovers Belles

== M ==
- Julia Mallam, Emmerdale actress
- John McLaughlin (born 1942), guitarist born in Kirk Sandall, co-creator (with Miles Davis) of the jazz/rock genre in the late 1960s and leader of Mahavishnu Orchestra and Shakti "fusion" bands
- Alan Menter, Doncaster-born rugby union player for South Africa; dermatologist
- Mary Millar, actress known as Rose in Keeping Up Appearances
- Danny Mitchell, UFC & Bellator Fighter
- David Moffett (born 1947), Doncaster-born business manager for Sport England, Welsh Rugby Union and other sports
- Adie Moses, Doncaster-born former football player for Barnsley F.C.

== P ==
- John Parr, singer of St Elmo's Fire
- David Pegg, Manchester United F. C. player, victim of Munich air disaster
- Jonti Picking, also known as "Weebl", author of the web cartoon Weebl & Bob
- George Porter, Nobel Prize-winning physical chemist
- Marguerite Porter, ballerina and actress
- Dennis Priestley, darts player

== R ==
- Ricky Ravenhill, professional footballer
- Diana Rigg, actress best known for ITV series The Avengers, the HBO series Game of Thrones, and as Bond girl in On Her Majesty's Secret Service
- Graham Rix, professional football manager and former England international footballer
- William Rokeby (died 1521), archbishop of Dublin; born and died in Kirk Sandall
- Dennis Rollins, jazz trombonist who lived in Doncaster from an early age and joined Doncaster Youth Jazz Orchestra at 14
- Danny Rose, professional footballer
- Mitch Rose, professional footballer
- John Ryan, previous chairman of Doncaster Rovers F.C.
- Mark Ryan, actor, known for roles in the ITV series Robin of Sherwood, the Starz series Black Sails, and various voices in the Transformers (film series)

== S ==
- Danny Schofield, professional footballer and coach
- Brian Shenton, sprinter representing England and Britain in the 1950s
- Sarah Stevenson, bronze medallist in Taekwondo at the 2008 Summer Olympics in Beijing

== T ==
- Lady Juliet Tadgell, Countess Fitzwilliam
- Lawrence Taylor, lead vocalist with metal band While She Sleeps
- Louis Tomlinson (born 24 December 1991), singer-songwriter member of the band One Direction
- James Toseland (born 1980), Doncaster-born MotoGP motorcycle racer, 2004 and 2007 Superbike World Champion
- Anna Tunnicliffe, Olympic sailor
- Gordon Turner (1930–1976), professional footballer, who still holds the record for most goals scored for Luton Town

== V ==
- Charles Verity (1814–1899), stone mason, building contractor and mayor of Doncaster

== W ==
- Steve Wade, executioner
- Ian Wardle, professional footballer
- Simon Weaver, professional footballer
- Roger Webster, musician
- Andrew White, presenter and producer of Walks Around Britain and writer of The Walker Mysteries novels.
- Len White (born 1930), professional footballer
- Mick Whitnall, lead guitarist with Babyshambles
- Dean Winstanley, darts player
- Chloe Wilburn, winner of Big Brother 16 (UK) and biggest prize fund in Big Brother UK history
- Bruce Woodcock, heavyweight boxing champion of Great Britain and the Empire

== Y ==
- Yungblud, television actor and alternative rock musician whose real name is Dominic Harrison
