= Julia Lee =

Julia Lee may refer to:

- Julia Lee (actress) (born 1975), American actress
- Julia Lee (musician) (1902–1958), American blues musician
- Julia Lee (rugby league) (born 1968), British rugby league referee
- Julia Lee (writer) (born 1976), American writer and professor
- Julia Southard Lee (1897–?), American textile chemist
