= Edward Simpson (forger) =

British geologist and forger (born 1815)

Edward Simpson ("Flint Jack")
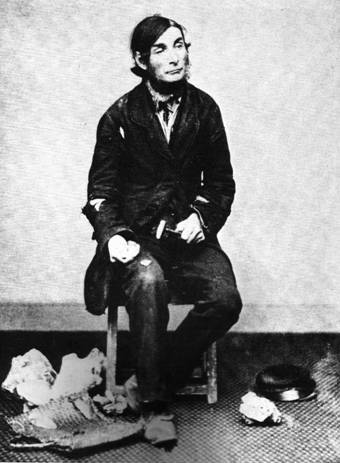
- Edward Simpson demonstrating his knapping skills.
- Born: 1815; Sleights, North Yorkshire
- Died: Unknown
- Occupations: Forger, fossil collector
- Known for: Forgery of prehistoric flint tools and geological specimens
- Criminal charges: Theft
- Penalty: Imprisonment. 12 months at Bedford Prison in 1866. One month at Northallerton Prison in 1871.

Edward Simpson ("Flint Jack") (born c. 1815, fl. 1874) was a British fossil hunter and forger of antiquities, such as arrowheads and fossils. He was also known as Fossil Willy, Old Antiquarian, Cockney Bill, Bones, and Shirtless. Other names included John Wilson, of Burlington, and Jerry Taylor, of Billery-dale, Yorkshire Moors.

== Biography ==
Edward Simpson was born in 1815 in the village of Sleights in North Yorkshire. At a young age he became apprenticed to local geologist and historian George Young, working first as a fossil collector before entering the world of forgery in 1843. The first of Simpson's many aliases, and his first venture into forgery, is believed to have come about when he met a Mr Dotchon in Whitby. Dotchon showed Simpson his first flint arrow head and asked if he could copy it.

In 1846, Simpson began drinking heavily and is quoted as saying: "In this year, I took to drinking; the worst job yet. Till then, I was always possessed of five pounds. I have since been in utter poverty, and frequently in great misery and want."

Recent work has suggested that the antiquarian biographies of Flint Jack may be based on misinformation provided by Simpson himself.

== Forgeries ==
Replica flint tools made by Simpson were sold nationally and have entered into the collections of several regional and national museums. As well as flints and fossils, Simpson made and sold fake ancient British and Roman urns. He initially used Bridlington clay but, finding the cliffs of Bridlington Bay unsuitable, moved to Stainton Dale, between Whitby and Scarborough. He travelled on foot for many miles selling his 'collections', which he claimed had been found on the Yorkshire moors. He is also reported to have successfully sold a genuine-looking Roman breastplate (pectorale) in Malton, made out of an old tea-tray and fashioned on his own body.

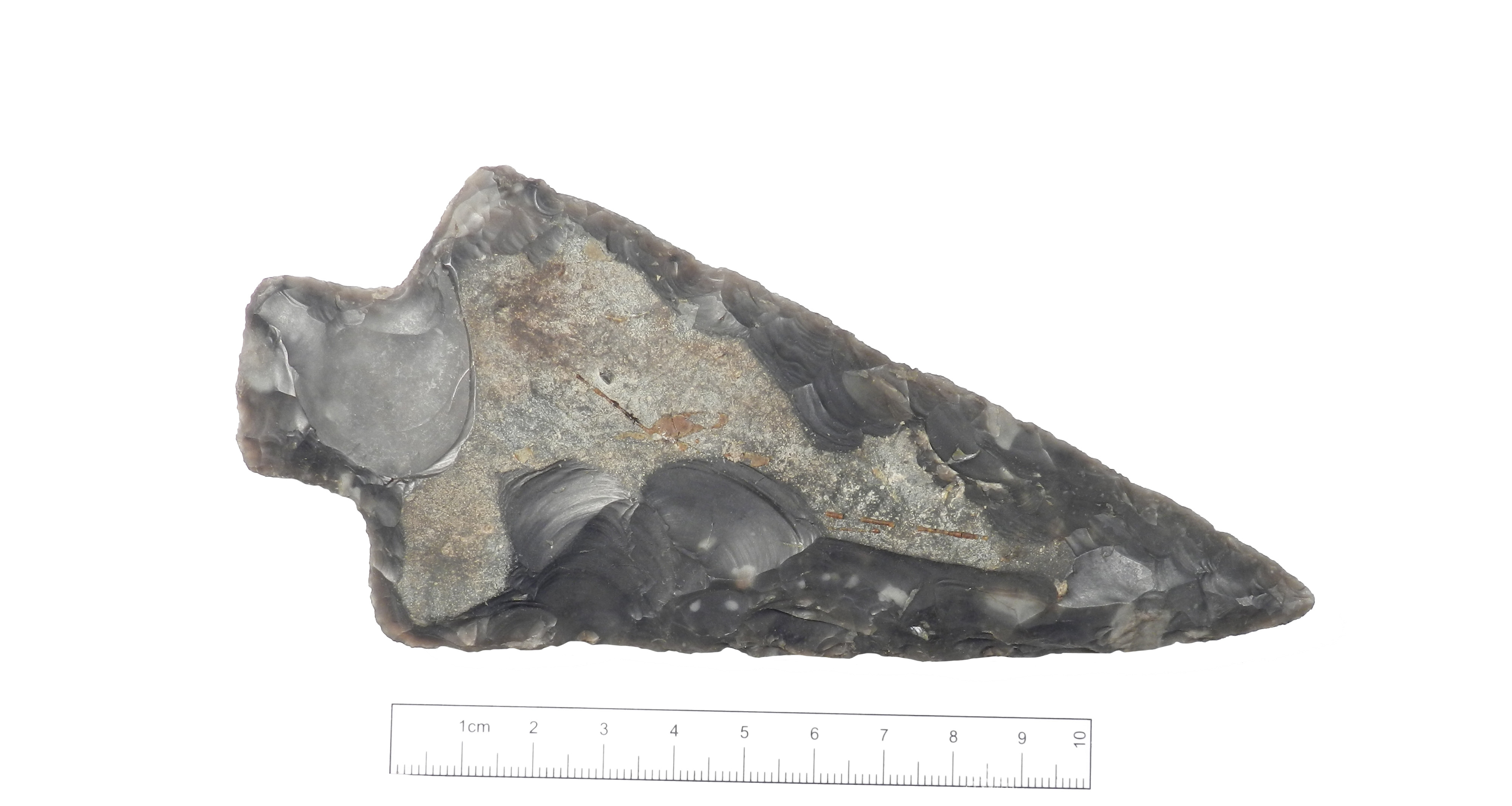
Replica flint spear attributed to Flint Jack

In London in 1859, Simpson was accused of forgery by Professor Tennant. The professor, fascinated by the hard-to-detect forgeries, persuaded Simpson to demonstrate his manufacturing methods to members of the Geologists' Association.

== Notoriety ==
After moving to London, Simpson sold artefacts to museums and other collections across the country, including pieces to the British Museum. On 19 March 1867 the Whitby Gazette reported on his trial and conviction:

Flint Jack – A notorious Yorkshireman – one of the greatest impostors of our times – was last week sentenced to 12 months imprisonment for felony at Bedford. The prisoner gave the name of Edward Jackson, but his real name is Edward Simpson, of Sleights, Whitby, although he is equally well known as John Wilson, of Burlington, and Jerry Taylor, of Billery-dale, Yorkshire Moors. Probably no man is wider known than Simpson is under his aliases in various districts – viz. 'Old Antiquarian', 'Fossil Willy', 'Bones', 'Shirtless', 'Cockney Bill', and 'Flint Jack', the latter name universally. Under one or other of these designations Edward Simpson is known throughout England, Scotland and Ireland – in fact, wherever geologists or archaeologists resided, or wherever a museum was established, there did Flint Jack assuredly pass off his forged fossils and antiquities. He imbibed, however, a liking for drink, and he admits that from that cause his life for 20 years past has been one of great misery. To supply his cravings for liquor he set about the forging of both fossils and antiquities about 23 years ago. In 1859, during one of his trips to London, Flint Jack was charged by Professor Tennant with the forgery of antiquities. He confessed, and was introduced on the platform of various societies, and exhibited the simple mode of his manufacture of spurious flints.

As news of Simpson's forgeries spread, his business suffered badly. An 1871 edition of The Antiquary warned of Flint Jack's presence in North Yorkshire and noted that "[h]is present trade is the vending of arrow-heads made of bottle-glass, which he works with even more skill than flint, and which he is disposing of by the score". Warnings were also published of his presence in Stamford where he was making flints, monastic seals and rings, and noted his incarceration for a month at Northallerton.

The last known sighting of Simpson was in Malton magistrates' court on 21 February 1874.

== Exhibition ==
An exhibition of Flint Jack's forgeries formed part of the Yorkshire Sculpture International 2019 art exhibition. The exhibition, held in the Henry Moore Institute was created by the artist Sean Lynch and titled 'The Rise and Fall of Flint Jack'.

== In popular culture ==
- The American alternative rock band, Monks of Doom, produced a record about Flint Jack, called Forgery. The lyrics celebrate Simpson's anti-hero status.

== See also ==
- Archaeological forgery
- List of people from Yorkshire
