= Global Cycling Network =

YouTube channel

YouTube information
- Channel: gcn
- Years active: 2013–present
- Genre: Cycling
- Subscribers: 3.52 million
- Views: 1.43 billion
- Last updated: 06 February 2026
- Website: www.globalcyclingnetwork.com

Global Cycling Network (GCN) is a cycling-related YouTube channel which was launched in the United Kingdom in 2013. The channel's parent company, Play Sports Network, became a subsidiary of Warner Bros. Discovery through its TNT Sports unit in 2019 and returned to private ownership in 2024.

Content on the channel is presented by former professional cyclists and cycling journalists including 2008 Vuelta a Extremadura winner Daniel Lloyd, under-23 British National Mountain Biking champion Simon Richardson and 2018 Irish national road race champion Conor Dunne.

== History ==
On 1 January 2013, Global Cycling Network was launched by SHIFT Active Media founder Simon Wear, under Google's now-defunct YouTube Original Channel Initiative, as part of its multi-channel network media strategy. Wear's original objective was to create a "network of quality cycling video content creators and give cycling global promotion through an official channel". The YouTube channel also provides a media channel for the promotion of the parent company's client brands.

In 2015, the channel was awarded Best Vlogger/Best Use of Video during the Cycling Media Awards 2015 awards night, which aims to recognise the best of UK cycling media. In 2016 the parent company's multi-channel network division was spun off as Play Sports Network, and management of the channel was transferred to the new company. On 18 April 2017 the channel broke the 1 million subscriber mark.

On 27 February 2017, Discovery Communications, the owner of Eurosport, announced the acquisition of a 20% stake in Play Sports Group, the company that owns the GCN channel. In 2019, Discovery Communications acquired a controlling interest in Play Sports Group and the GCN franchise, increasing holdings to 71%.

On 13 June 2024, it was announced that Warner Bros. Discovery had sold the channel back to Simon Wear. This ended the co-production of broadcast content by Eurosport and GCN+.

== Content ==
Global Cycling Network's content tends to be predominantly road cycling-related, with regular sections consisting of instructional videos, including videos on bicycle riding, maintenance and tech news, how-to videos, and a weekly news bulletin, "The GCN Show". The channel also features interviews of professional cyclists and coverage of international professional cycling events, including the Tour of Beijing, Dubai Tour, and the three Grand Tour races (the Tour de France, Giro d'Italia and Vuelta a España). Occasionally, the channel also creates videos on cyclo-cross and less frequently, mountain biking (mostly covered on Global Cycling Network's sister channel, Global Mountain Bike Network).

The channel also produced a "Road Bike Party" series of videos featuring former trials rider Martyn Ashton performing stunts on road bikes. It was a continuation of Ashton's independently-created first video, Road Bike Party 1. As of January 2025, Road Bike Party 2 had received more than 20 million views.

In 2014, British Cycling partnered with Global Cycling Network in the creation of its Racesmart campaign, which aimed to promote safe cycle racing in Great Britain.

== Presenters ==
=== Global Cycling Network ===
- Simon Richardson (2013-present), former professional cyclist and under-23 British National Mountain Biking champion.
- Dan Lloyd (2013-present), former professional cyclist and 2008 Vuelta a Extremadura winner.
- Oliver Bridgewood (2018-present), PhD graduate and previous writer and video producer at Cycling Weekly.
- Conor Dunne (2020-present), former professional cyclist and 2018 Irish national road race champion.
- Alex Paton (2020-present) former professional cyclist, hired to work on the GCN Tech channel.

=== GCN en Español (Spanish-language, since 2018) ===
- Lucas Sebastian Haedo
- Bernat Font

=== GCN en français (French-language) ===
- Maxime Prieur
- Séverine Jouan

=== GCN Italia (Italian-language, since 2019) ===
- Alan Marangoni
- Giorgio Brambilla

=== GCN Japan (Japanese-language, 2019-2023) ===
- Yukihiro Doi

=== GCN auf Deutsch (German-language, since 2020) ===
- Patrick Haller
- Laurin Winter

=== Former presenters ===
- Alexys Brunel
- Jon Cannings
- Florian Chabbal
- Loic Chetout
- Tom Last
- Manon Lloyd (2018-2024), former Welsh track cyclist and 2016 UEC European Track Championships team pursuit bronze medallist.
- James "Hank" Lowsley-Williams (2018-2025), former professional cyclist.
- Katherine Moore
- Mayalen Noriega
- Chris Opie (2018-2020), former professional cyclist. Chris left GCN to focus on returning to professional racing.
- Louis Pijourlet
- Emma Pooley (2018-2019), former time trial and duathlon world champion.. In march 2019, Pooley announced she would be leaving the channel to concentrate on engineering.
- Jeremy Powers (2019-2021), former professional racing cyclist who won over 90 UCI victories, four USA Cyclocross National Championships, and the 2015 Pan-American UCI cyclocross championships.. He left GCN in 2021 to join WHOOP.
- Oscar Pujol
- Matt Stephens (2013-2018), one of the original GCN presenters, 1998 British National Road Race Champion and 1992 Olympian (Road Race). Stephens served as a GCN presenter for four and a half years before leaving the programme to focus on live race commentary for Eurosport.
- Björn Thurau
- Mario Vogt
- Richard Weinzheimer (2021-2024)
- Tobias Knaup (2021-2024)

== See also ==
- Cycling network
