= Listed buildings in Asenby =

Asenby is a civil parish in the county of North Yorkshire, England. It contains seven listed buildings that are recorded in the National Heritage List for England. All the listed buildings are designated at Grade II, the lowest of the three grades, which is applied to "buildings of national importance and special interest". The parish contains the village of Asenby and the surrounding area. All the listed buildings are in the village, and consist of houses and a barn.

== Buildings ==
Name and location	Photograph	Date	Notes
Hillside; 54.17184°N 1.39223°W		Mid to late 18th century	The house is in red brick with a pantile roof. There are two storeys, three bays, and a single-storey rear outshut. The doorway has a plain surround, the windows are horizontally-sliding sashes, and all the openings have elliptical relieving arches.
Farm Cottage and Guy Reed Farms Estate Office; 54.17265°N 1.39034°W	—	Early to mid 18th century	A sandstone house in two builds, the right gable end in red brick, and with a pantile roof. There are two storeys, a block of two bays, and a lower two-bay block to the right. The doorway has a fanlight and voussoirs. The windows in the left part are sashes, in the right part they are horizontally-sliding sashes, and the ground floor windows have voussoirs.
Asenby Hall, wall and gate piers 54.17269°N 1.39104°W		Late 18th century	The house is in red brick with stone dressings, and consists of a main block with three storeys and three bays, a two-storey two-bay wing to the right, and a single-storey single-bay extension further to the right. The main block has a plinth, quoins, floor bands, and a pantile roof. In the right bay is a doorway with Doric pilasters, an entablature, and a dentilled triangular pediment. The windows in the lower two floors are sashes with moulded surrounds, and incised lintels with keystones, and in the top floor they are casements with plain lintels. The wing has a stone slate roof with stone coping and shaped kneelers to the right, sash windows with incised lintels and keystones in the ground floor, and casements with segmental arches above, and the extension has a pantile roof and a sash window. In front of the house is a garden wall in brick with stone coping, and the gates piers are squat and rusticated.
Asenby Lodge; 54.17141°N 1.39304°W	—	Late 18th century	A stone house with rusticated quoins, a wooden eaves cornice with paired dentils, and a hipped Westmorland slate roof. There are two storeys, three bays and a rear service wing. On the front is an entrance with Doric columns and an entablature, and the doorcase has pilasters, a fanlight, and a moulded archivolt. The windows are sashes with incised lintels.
Roecliffe House; 54.17306°N 1.38683°W	—	Late 18th century	The house is in red brick with some stone, string courses and pantile roofs. There are two storeys and two bays, and a single-storey extension on the right. The doorway is in the centre, above it is a recessed panel, and the windows are horizontally-sliding sashes. The ground floor openings have splayed lintels.
Barn north of Asenby Hall; 54.17287°N 1.39123°W	—	Late 18th or early 19th century	The barn is in red brick on a stone plinth, with the remains of a stone slate eaves course, and a pantile roof with stone coping and the remains of kneelers. It has five bays, a central segmental-arched cart entrance, vents in diamond patterns, and the remains of a dovecote.
Highfield House; 54.17380°N 1.38848°W	—	Early 19th century	The house is in stone, with quoins, and a Westmorland slate roof with coped gables, stone capping and plain kneelers. There are two storeys, three bays and a rear wing. The central entrance has a moulded surround, and a triangular pediment on consoles. The windows are sashes in architrave, with incised splayed lintels and keystones.
