= Mary Bateman =

English murderer

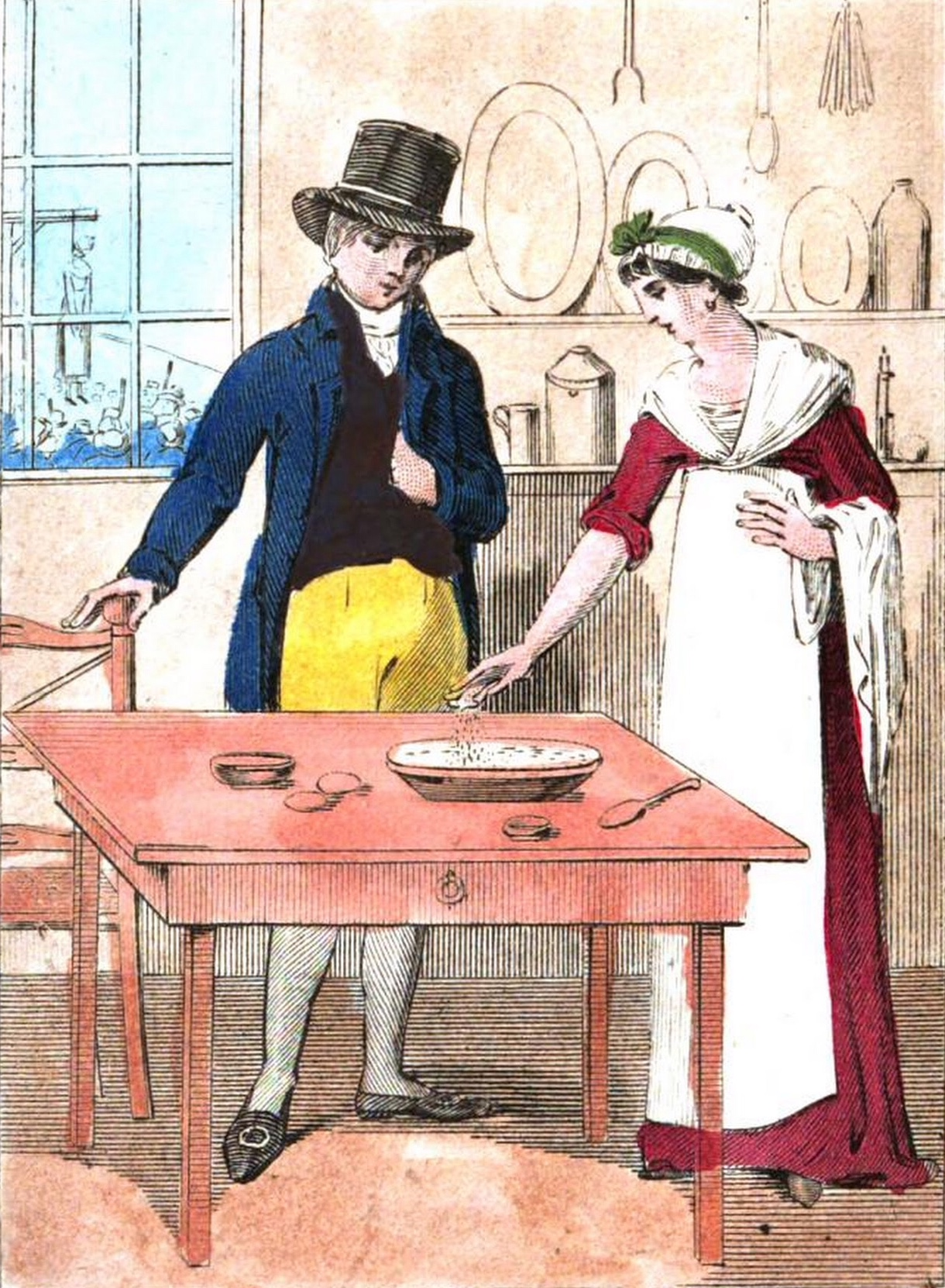
- Mary Bateman mixing poison
- Born: Mary Harker; 1768; Asenby, England
- Died: 20 March 1809 (aged 40–41); York Prison, England
- Occupations: Servant; Con artist
- Years active: 1780s–1809
- Known for: The so-called 'Yorkshire Witch'
- Spouse: John Bateman (m. 1792)
- Children: 2
- Status: Executed
- Criminal charges: Fraud; Murder
- Penalty: Death by hanging

Details
- Victims: Rebecca Perigo
- Imprisoned at: Female Prison, York

Mary Bateman (née Harker, 1768 – 20 March 1809) was an English criminal and alleged witch, known as the Yorkshire Witch, who was tried and executed for murder during the early 19th century.

== Biography ==
Most of the details of Mary Bateman's life are known from The Extraordinary Life and Character of Mary Bateman, published soon after her trial and death. She was born in Asenby in the North Riding of Yorkshire in 1768. Her father was a farmer. She learned to read and write and, from age 13, worked as a servant girl in Thirsk, North Riding of Yorkshire.

She moved to York aged 20 and worked as a dressmaker. However, she fled to Leeds the next year after being involved in a burglary. During the next four years she worked as a mantua maker, and also began to build a reputation as a fortune-teller and 'wise woman'. In 1792, she married John Bateman, who was a wheelwright. During these early years of her marriage, she also undertook several robberies and was caught several times, escaping prison by bribing those who witnessed her activities. In 1796, John joined the Army, and Bateman accompanied him away from Leeds, however within one year they had returned to Leeds. Among other crimes, she is reported to have once roamed the streets of Leeds after a major fire begging for money and goods for victims, but instead retained the charitable gifts for herself. According to author Summer Stevens, she also worked as an abortionist.

In 1806, Bateman joined the followers of the prophetess Joanna Southcott and attended meetings. As part of a Southcottian sect, she created the hoax known as The Prophet Hen of Leeds, in which eggs laid by a hen were purported to have engraved on them 'Christ is coming' – a message believed to precede end times. Three of these eggs were displayed by Bateman and members of the public were charged a penny to see them. When the hen was taken away from her, it laid no more prophetic eggs. It was later found that she had written on the eggs using concentrated vinegar, and then reinserted them into the hen's oviduct.

In the same year, Bateman was approached by William and Rebecca Perigo – Rebecca was suffering from chest pains and Bateman diagnosed that she had been put under a spell. However, over the next several months, Bateman began feeding them pudding which was laced with poison. Rebecca's condition worsened however and she finally died in 1808. In October 1808 William Perigo accused Bateman of poisoning his wife, as well as defrauding money from them for the two years preceding to pay for "charms" and cures. Although Bateman proclaimed her innocence, a search of her home turned up poison as well as many personal belongings of her victims including the Perigo couple.

=== Trial and execution ===
Bateman's trial took place in York in March 1809. According to The Criminal Chronology of York Castle by William Knipe, which was written in 1867, the trial lasted 11 hours, though the jury took only a few moments to find her guilty of the charges of fraud and the murder of Rebecca Perigo. The book also claims that immediately following the sentence of death from the judge, Bateman said that she was 22-weeks pregnant to avoid hanging. The judge subsequently requested that the Sheriff gather a panel of 'matrons' to assess Bateman's claim. Twelve married women were sworn into the jury and conducted a physical examination of Bateman, concluding that she was not pregnant.

William Knipe's 1867 account suggests Bateman had a daughter at home as well as an infant child in the prison with her. She reportedly mailed her wedding ring back to her husband to give to the daughter.

Bateman was hanged alongside two men on Monday 20 March 1809.

=== Dissection ===
After her execution, her body was transferred to Leeds General Infirmary, which publicly displayed her body, charging 3 pence per visitor. Her body was dissected by William Hey, who spread the event across three days. On day one medical students paid to view the corpse, on day two “about 100 tickets were available to gentlemen [professional Leeds men] who paid five guineas”, and on day three women could buy a day ticket to attend Hey's lectures on the body. Strips of her skin were tanned into leather and sold as magic charms to ward off evil spirits. The tip of her tongue was collected by the governor of Ripon Prison. Two books from the library of Mexborough House were covered in her skin – Sir John Cheeke's Hurt of Sedition: How Grievous it is to a Common Welth (1569) and Richard Braithwaite’s Arcadian Princess (1635); the books went missing in the mid-nineteenth century.

== Legacy ==
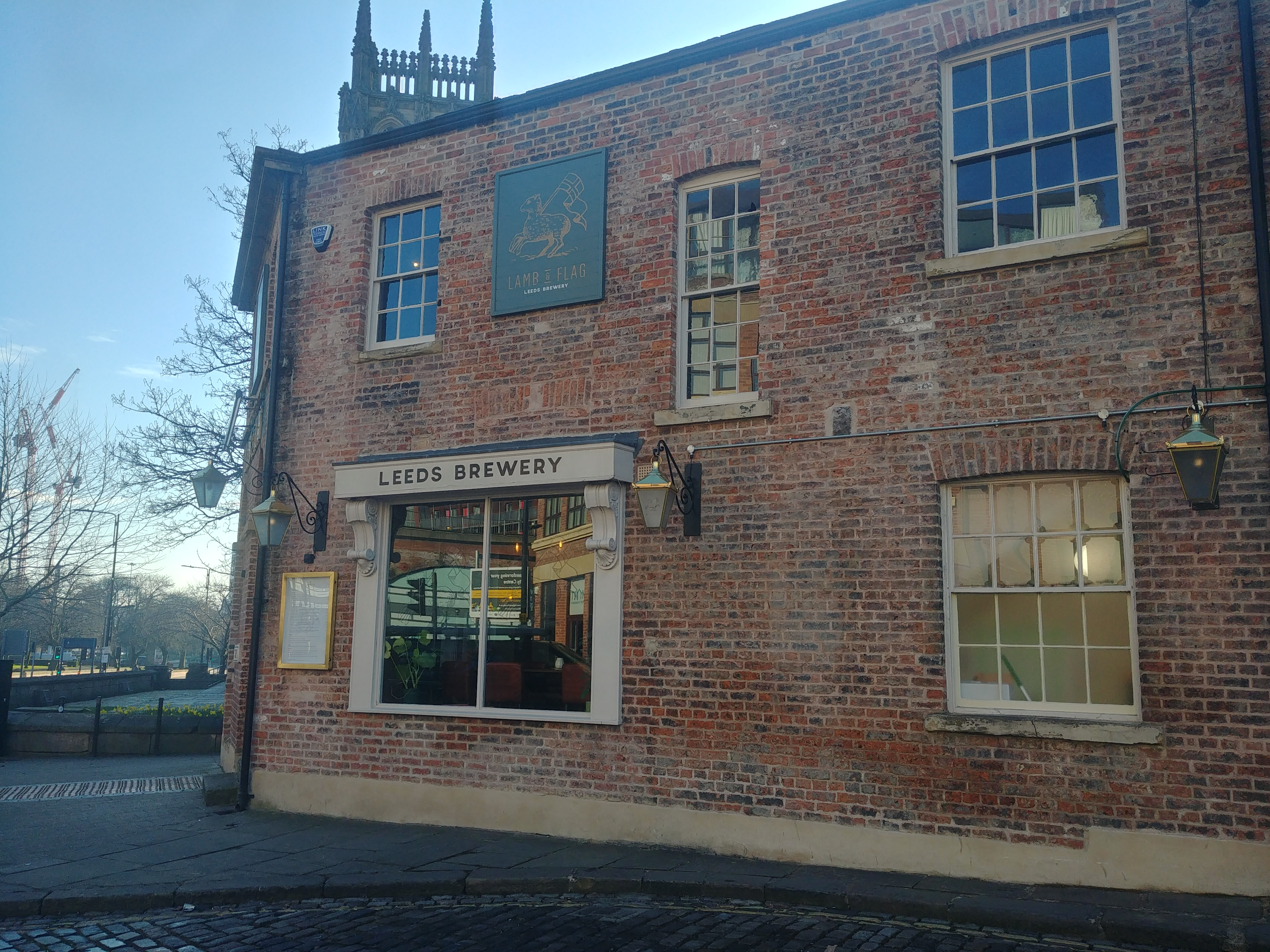
Lamb & Flag pub, Leeds, the building before conversion was the former home of Mary Bateman

Bateman's death caused a sensation at the time and details were eagerly consumed by the public through books and articles. A popular account, The Extraordinary Life and Character of Mary Bateman was published, which was already in its twelfth edition two years after her execution. The episode of the prophetic eggs was cited by Charles Mackay as a minor example of the credulity of the public in his Extraordinary Popular Delusions and the Madness of Crowds.

Bateman's skeleton was on display to the public at the Thackray Medical Museum in Leeds until 2015, when it was moved to Leeds University.

A BBC-TV programme about Bateman, featuring a modern-day descendant of hers (Tracy Whitaker), showed Bateman's skull being laser-scanned to demonstrate how her face may well have appeared. It was first shown on 12 April 2001, entitled The People Detective – 1. Witch and presented by historian and curator Daru Rooke.

== Historiography ==
As early as 1867, William Knipe suggested that she was "addicted" to crime. Historian Owen Davies describes Bateman as having a "pathological need to steal", implying that there was a psychological reason behind the motivations for some of her crimes.

== See also ==
- List of serial killers by country
