= Ian Wardle =

English footballer

Personal information
- Full name: Ian Spencer Wardle
- Date of birth: 27 March 1970 (age 56)
- Place of birth: Doncaster, England
- Position: Goalkeeper

Senior career*
| Years | Team | Apps | (Gls) |
| 1988–1990 | Barnsley | 9 | (0) |
| | Frickley Athletic | ? | (?) |

International career
- England School
- * Club domestic league appearances and goals

Ian Spencer Wardle (born 27 March 1970) is an English former footballer.

== Career ==
Ian Wardle was signed for Barnsley from schoolboy forms by former Manager Allan Clarke in 1986. He made his league debut against Middlesbrough in September 1989. This was before He suffered a double break of his left leg following a collision with Robbie Earle during a match vs Port Vale in March 1990. That was his last professional game and he left the club after making nine appearances in the Football League to join Frickley Athletic.
