= Victoria Nixon =

British writer and former model

- Born: 7 June 1948 (age 78); Barnsley, West Riding of Yorkshire, England
- Occupations: Model; advertising; magazine editor; deli ewner; company director
- Years active: 1964–present
- Website: victorianixon.com

Victoria Nixon (born 7 June 1948) is a British author and company director. She was previously an international fashion model.

== Early life ==
Nixon was born in Barnsley, West Riding of Yorkshire,

== Modelling and acting career ==
In 1966, at the age of 18, Nixon was spotted in London's Bond Street by fashion photographer Helmut Newton who offered her a contract launching a decade-long international modelling career. Subsequently, she appeared in Vogue, Harpers Bazaar, Glamour, Nova, 19 and Elle. Nixon was selected as the Daily Mail's 'Face of 68', and featured in a number of high-profile press advertising campaigns and was the first British model to work with Riccardo Gay's modelling agency in Milan.

Nixon appeared on a number of TV programmes. She appeared wearing a "space-fashion outfit" in the 1969 live coverage of the Apollo 11 Moon landing, with presenter Cliff Michelmore and journalist Jean Rook during the live studio broadcast. She was the first "promo star" of the BBC's Top of the Pops where she was described in the 11 April 1969 issue of Disc and Music Echo magazine as an "…Angelic looking Hell's Angel…" and the "…girlfriend of promotion ace Bill Fowler…" When a music act, such as Andy Williams or Kenny Rogers, was unable to appear live, producer/director Mel Cornish would pre-film a clip of her to broadcast with the song. She was featured in a 1975 version of the hugely successful and long-running TV campaign for Cadbury's Flake.

=== Business career ===
After modelling, Nixon relocated to Australia for several years, at first working as an advertising copywriter. She became the Melbourne editor of the former POL magazine, an avant-garde fashion and lifestyle glossy, from 1978 to 1985. In 1992, Nixon opened the One Stop Fresh, a delicatessen in Fulham, South London, that specialised in healthy lunchtime food. One Stop Fresh was the first deli in the UK to use eco-friendly packaging.

In 2006, Nixon co-founded the British company Aircell Structures, Ltd. that designs and manufactures humanitarian aid products for medical charities and aid agencies (such as the IFRC, British and German Red Cross, Marie Stopes International and Vision Salud).

=== Author ===
While running the deli, Nixon's first book, Supermodels' Beauty Secrets was published in 2002 with contributions from Jerry Hall, Kate Moss and other leading models. It has also been translated into Spanish, Hungarian and Latvian. It formed part of Victoria's Celebrity Inspiration in "Beauty Flash", the Liz Dwyer weekly column in TV Now.

Nixon's follow-up book Supermodels' Diet Secrets, based on her experience both as a model and latterly as a deli owner, was published in 2004 and the Daily Express bought the rights to serialise it. Head Shot, another Nixon authored book, was published in August 2019. It is a coming-of-age memoir focusing on her life as an International model while confronting the tragic deaths of her entire family.

== Works ==
- Nixon, Victoria (2002). Supermodels' Beauty Secrets. Little, Brown. ISBN 978-0-7499-2344-0.
- Nixon, Victoria (2004). Supermodels' Diet Secrets. Little, Brown Book Group Limited. ISBN 0-7499-2517-5.
- Nixon, Victoria (2019). Head Shot. Unbound. ISBN 978-1-78352-779-3.
