= Willie Intin =

Scottish cricketer

Personal information
- Full name: John Wilfred Intin
- Born: 8 July 1886; Hull, Yorkshire, England
- Died: 11 April 1970 (aged 83); Grangemouth, Stirlingshire, Scotland
- Batting: Right-handed
- Bowling: Right-arm medium

Domestic team information
- Years: Team
- 1920: Scotland

Career statistics
Competition	First-class
Matches	1
Runs scored	14
Batting average	14.00
100s/50s	–/–
Top score	14
Balls bowled	102
Wickets	2
Bowling average	21.00
5 wickets in innings	–
10 wickets in match	–
Best bowling	2/25
Catches/stumpings	–/–
- Source: Cricinfo, 1 November 2022

John Wilfred 'Willie' Intin (8 July 1886 – 11 April 1970) was a Scottish first-class cricketer.

Intin was born in England at Hull in July 1886. He played club cricket in Scotland for Stirlingshire, making his first appearance for the club in 1905. He played cricket for Stirlingshire for 34 years, until his retirement in 1939. In addition to playing club cricket, Intin also made a single appearance in first-class cricket for Scotland against Ireland at Edinburgh in 1920. He took 2 wickets in the Ireland first innings with his right-arm medium pace bowling, dismissing Bob Lambert and Richard Power. He batted once in the match, being dismissed for 14 runs in the Scotland first innings by Lambert. Outside of cricket, Intin was employed as an assistant works manager at Grangemouth. In 1934, he was involved in a road traffic accident which led to the death of a young boy; he was subsequently fined £10 for his part in the accident. Intin was elected to the Burgh of Grangemouth council in 1949. He died at Grangemouth in April 1970.
