= Colin McLocklan =

English footballer

Personal information
- Date of birth: 6 April 1952 (age 74)
- Place of birth: Hull, England
- Position: Forward

Senior career*
Years	Team	Apps	(Gls)
1977	Connecticut Bicentennials	12	(1)
1978	Chicago Sting	16	(1)
1979	Indianapolis Daredevils	28	(12)
- * Club domestic league appearances and goals

Colin McLocklan (1952) is an English retired professional Association football forward who played two seasons in the North American Soccer League and at least one in the American Soccer League.

== Career ==
McLocklan played cricket for Hull C.C. in the Yorkshire league from the early 70s before leaving Hull C.C to play for Sheffield United and York also in the Yorkshire league before retiring in 2001 season.

McLocklan played for North Ferriby United in the Yorkshire league scoring 177 goals before going to the United States to play in the North American soccer league.

In 1977, he played for the Connecticut Bicentennials of the North American Soccer League. He signed with the Chicago Sting for the 1978 season. He played in the game home and away against Cuba. Touring the Caribbean, McLocklan played against the national teams of Haiti, Martinique and Barbados before ending the preseason tour with a friendly against New York Cosmos. In 1979, he moved to the Indianapolis Daredevils of the American Soccer League. He played for Goole Town in the Northern Premier League from 1980 to 1987.

He went on to be player-manager of Bridlington Trinity and Winterton Rangers in the Northern counties league.

He played squash for Hull and East Riding in Hull and District and Yorkshire league.

McLocklan is married to the manager of the social work department at the University of Hull. He lives with his wife at the University Lawns, Cottingham which supports student living at the halls for Hull University. He works for Scunthorpe United scouting talented academy players.
