= Oliver Bridgewood =

Cycling journalist

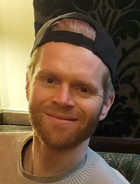
- Oliver Bridgewood at a public appearance in Wakefield, December 2023
- Born: 21 February 1985 (age 41); Doncaster
- Education: University of Nottingham, University of Manchester, University of Loughborough
- Occupation: Journalist
- Writing career
- Years active: 2015–present
- Subject: Cycling

Oliver Bridgewood (born 21 February 1985) is a British cycling journalist, presenter and former organic chemist. He is best known for his work as a presenter on Global Cycling Network and GCN Tech, as well as his previous editorial work with Cycling Weekly.

== Early life and academic career ==
Bridgewood pursued a background in natural sciences before transitioning into media and journalism. He earned a Bachelor of Science in Chemistry from Loughborough University in 2007, followed by a Master of Science in Chemistry from the University of Manchester in 2010.

He went on to complete a Doctor of Philosophy in Synthetic Organic Chemistry at the University of Nottingham in 2015. His doctoral research focused on asymmetric synthesis and vascular disrupting agents. During his time at university, Bridgewood developed a keen interest in competitive cycling.

== Journalism and media career ==
=== Cycling Weekly ===
Following the completion of his PhD, Bridgewood joined Cycling Weekly as a tech writer and video producer. Leveraging his scientific background, he created content focusing on cycling physics, aerodynamics, equipment testing and sports science.

During his tenure at Cycling Weekly, he headed the publication's YouTube channel and produced the feature-length documentary Project 49, documenting his attempt to break the 50-minute barrier for a 25-mile time trial.

=== Global Cycling Network ===
In 2018, Bridgewood joined Play Sports Group as a presenter for the Global Cycling Network, becoming one of the principal presenters on GCN Tech.

At GCN, his content has focused on aerodynamic efficiency, equipment modification, gear reviews and scientific testing of cycling performance claims.

=== Amateur cycling career ===
Bridgewood regularly competes in British domestic amateur racing, specialising in time trials, hill climbs, road races and criteriums.
