= Michael Turley =

English footballer

Personal information
- Full name: Michael Douglas Turley
- Date of birth: 14 February 1936 (age 90)
- Place of birth: Rotherham, England
- Date of death: 1982 (aged 45–46)
- Place of death: Lancaster, England
- Position: Wing half

Senior career*
Years	Team	Apps	(Gls)
1953–1956	Sheffield Wednesday	3	(0)
1956–1957	Burnley	0	(0)
Total		3	(0)
- * Club domestic league appearances and goals

Michael Douglas Turley (14 February 1936 – 1982) was an English professional footballer who played as a wing half in the Football League for Sheffield Wednesday. He was on the books of Burnley without representing them in the League.
