= Alf Lee =

English footballer

Personal information
- Full name: James Alfred Lee
- Date of birth: 10 December 1891 (Note: Birth registered in Q1 1892)
- Place of birth: Rotherham, England
- Date of death: 1948 (aged 56–57)
- Position: Full-back

Senior career*
Years	Team	Apps	(Gls)
1911–1912	Rotherham County		
1912–1919	Grimsby Town	15	(0)
1919–1922	West Ham United	26	(0)
1922–1923	Newport County	4	(0)
- * Club domestic league appearances and goals

James Alfred Lee (10 December 1891 – 1948) was an English professional footballer who played as a full-back.

Born in Rotherham, Yorkshire, Lee started his career at Rotherham County before moving to Grimsby Town. He transferred to West Ham United for the 1919–20 season. The club had just been promoted to the Football League for the first time and he participated in their opening day fixture against Lincoln City. He was used mainly as a backup to regular full-backs Billy Cope and Frank Burton, but made 26 Second Division appearances while with the club. His final games came in January 1922 against Swansea Town in the FA Cup. He ended his career with Newport County, playing four matches in the 1922–23 season.
