= Verity Smith =

British rugby player

- Born: Kingston upon Hull, East Riding of Yorkshire, England
- Occupation(s): Rugby player and LGBT+ rights activist

Rugby union career
- Current team: Leeds Rhinos
Senior career
Years	Team	Apps	(Points)
–	Hull Ladies		
–	Rotherham Phoenix		
- Rugby league career

Playing information
Club
Years	Team	Pld	T	G	FG	P
	Leeds Rhinos (wheelchair)

Verity "Vez" Smith is a rugby player and LGBT+ rights activist based in the United Kingdom. He has served as diversity and inclusion lead for International Gay Rugby, and previously played rugby union for Rotherham Phoenix and rugby league for Dewsbury Moor.

== Biography ==
Originally from Hull, Smith played a variety of sports in his youth, including association football, ice hockey, and Thai boxing. He began playing rugby at the age of 11, after his grandparents took him to see a Hull Vixens match. After proving talented at the sport, he obtained permission to play for the Hull Ladies senior side as a teenager, eventually being picked to represent North East of England.

Smith was diagnosed with polyendocrine metabolic ovarian syndrome (PMOS), went through the menopause at 19, and had a hysterectomy at 22. These medical issues prevented him from progressing to playing Premiership rugby.

As a teenager, Smith identified as a "butch lesbian." In 2016, he came out as a transgender man, and continued to play rugby during his transition for Rotherham Phoenix. He was crowned Rhino Prop Star 2018 in a public vote.

Smith has spoken about facing transphobia while playing rugby, including having blood spat in his mouth by opposing team players and having match officials mock him. In October 2019, he filed a complaint with the Independent Press Standards Organisation after The Sunday Times used a photo of him to illustrate an article suggesting that trans women posed a danger in rugby. The newspaper later replaced the photo and issued a statement saying that the use of the photo had been "inappropriate and misleading in terms of both his gender and his views."

In 2019, Smith suffered a severe spinal injury after being tackled. After recovering from the injury, he played wheelchair rugby league with the Leeds Rhinos in the UK Super League.

In February 2020, Smith attended a forum held by World Rugby as a representative of International Gay Rugby to discuss its transgender participation guidelines. At the forum, Smith was the only transgender rugby player in attendance and was not given the opportunity to present testimony. Later that year, World Rugby announced a controversial change in its guidelines that would effectively ban trans women from playing in women's competitions. Smith condemned the ban, saying that it was "about policing female bodies," and that the research presented in the forum had been performed entirely on cisgender athletes "with an assumption that trans women fall under the category of cis elite males," meaning that there was "no research on trans women within the rugby environment."

In 2021, Smith began working for the charity Mermaids as a Trans Inclusion in Sports Youth Worker. He was nominated for the Positive Role Model Award (LGBT) at Britain’s National Diversity Awards 2021.

In March 2023, Smith was interviewed as a guest on Jonathan Van Ness' podcast Getting Curious with Jonathan Van Ness.

In 2024, Smith featured on the cover of the book Transgender and Non-Binary People in Everyday Sport A Trans Feminist Approach to Improving Inclusion (2024) by Abby Barras.
