= Asenby =

Village and civil parish in North Yorkshire, England

Coordinates: 54.171959°N 1.393630°W

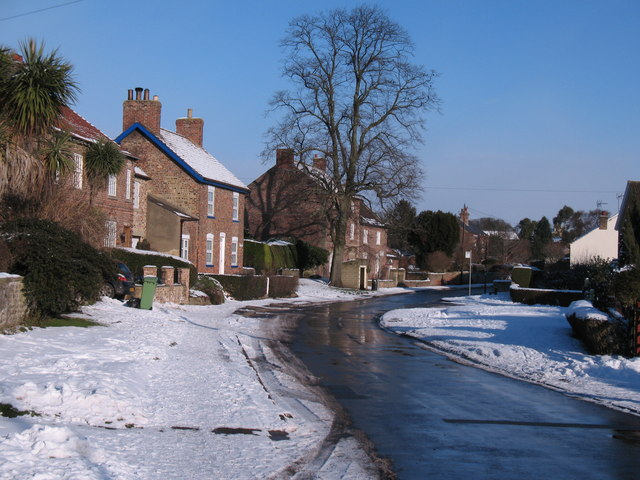
- Main Street, Asenby

- Location within North Yorkshire
- Population: 311
- OS grid reference: SE396752
- Unitary authority: North Yorkshire
- Ceremonial county: North Yorkshire
- Region: Yorkshire and the Humber
- Country: England
- Sovereign state: United Kingdom
- Post town: THIRSK
- Postcode district: YO7
- Police: North Yorkshire
- Fire: North Yorkshire
- Ambulance: Yorkshire
- UK Parliament: Skipton and Ripon (UK Parliament constituency)

Asenby is a village and civil parish in the county of North Yorkshire, England, with a population of 285 (2001 census), increasing to 311 at the 2011 census. The village is about 5 miles (8 km) south-west of Thirsk and 7 miles (11 km) east of Ripon. It is 12 miles (19 km) south of the County Town of Northallerton on the south bank of the River Swale.

== History ==
The village is mentioned in the Domesday Book of 1086 as Estanebi in the Yarlestre hundred. It was part of the manor of Topcliffe at the time of the Norman Conquest, and followed the descent of that manor thereafter.

The toponymy of the village name is the combination of the Norse personal name of Eystein and bi giving the meaning of Eystein's farm.

== Governance ==
The village lies within the Skipton and Ripon UK Parliament constituency. The local Parish Council has five members.

From 1974 to 2023 it was part of the Borough of Harrogate, it is now administered by the unitary North Yorkshire Council.

== Geography ==
The village lies on the south bank of the River Swale and wedged in between the A168 and A167 roads. The majority of the surrounding land in the parish is given to farming.

== Culture and community ==
The village is mostly housing with one public house on the outskirts. There is no church in the parish.

== Demography ==
=== Population ===
Year	1881	1891	1901	1911	1921	1931	1951	1961	2001	2011
Total	171	177	173	168	161	179	151	161	285	311

=== 2001 Census ===
Of the total population, 97.5% declared themselves as White/British with the rest being White/Other. The gender split was 50.8% male to 49.2% female. The declaration of religious belief was 77.9% Christian, 20.7% No religion/Not stated and 1% Jewish and 1% Other. There were 128 dwellings.

=== 2011 Census ===
Of the total population, 97.1% declared themselves as White/British with 1.6% being White/Other. The rest were made of 0.6% mixed White/Asian, 0.3% White/Irish and 0.1% British Asian. The gender split was 51.4% male to 48.6% female. The declaration of religious belief was 72.7% Christian, 25.7% No religion/Not stated and 1.6% Buddhist. There were 130 dwellings.

== Notable people ==
- Mary Bateman (also known as the Yorkshire Witch) was born in the village.

== See also ==
- Listed buildings in Asenby
