= Julie O'Neill =

English author (born 1971)

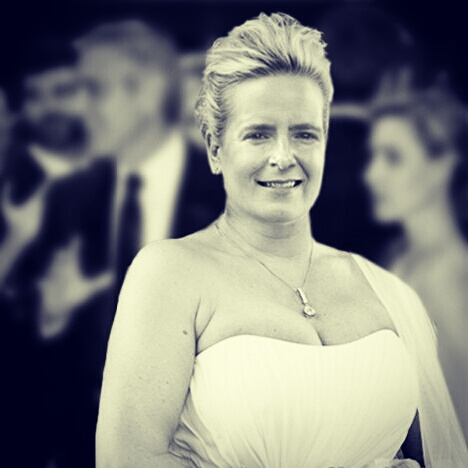
- O'Neill in 2012

Julie O'Neill is an English fiction author.

== Biography ==
O'Neill was born in Yorkshire in 1971. O'Neill attended the University of Edinburgh before embarking on a career in glamour modelling. In her 20s and early 30s O'Neill travelled the world, and spent time living in France,[Morocco, Vietnam, Malaysia, Spain and Portugal. She worked as, amongst other things, a shop dresser, journalist, burlesque dancer, dominatrix, rubber bouncer, security service operative, children's party entertainer, hypnotherapist, hazelnut sorter and night club DJ. Before returning to England she spent three years travelling through the Far East on an elephant called Bolabesar.

Her first novel, the comic/erotic Insatiable, was published in February 2012 and featured an extract from her (genital) warts and all autobiography The Swords of a Thousand Men. Her second book The Prize, a crime novel set in Prague, was published in September 2012, and draws heavily on her time living in the Czech capital.

In November 2013, O'Neill walked Wainwright's 182-mile (293 km) Coast to Coast trail between St Bees in Cumbria and Robin Hood's Bay in North Yorkshire, naked apart from a pair of walking boots and a rucksack, in order to raise awareness of how rising heating costs were affecting the elderly. A documentary of her ramble was filmed and is due for a 2014 release. It has the working title Ice Station Grandma.

O'Neill lives in Masham in a ménage à trois with fellow writer Jack Darrington and ex-European PGA golf pro Bob Starkey, together with her boxer dogs.

== Works ==
=== Insatiable (2012) ===
What did a recently divorced, single woman of forty-one, who'd been off the market for eighteen years do? It wasn't like she was ready for the knacker's yard just yet. She reckoned that she still looked good. Long blonde hair, highlights and lowlights, green eyes, a good figure, the springs still holding up on her 36D boobs. And she still felt horny. Extremely horny. In fact, ditching the cheating swine of a husband had seen her libido rediscover itself and go into overdrive. So what did a recently divorced, single woman of forty-one, who'd been off the market for eighteen years do? Internet dating that's what you did...

With an unsatisfying marriage and an unfaithful husband behind her, forty-one-year-old divorcee Claire Stevenson embarks on a sexual odyssey.

=== The Prize (2012) ===
Prague. A stag party, pole dancers, an ambitious porn entrepreneur, a scheming trophy girlfriend, a weary detective and a two million Euro drug deal...

Prague police detective Vavrin Moravec is desperate to change his life. When inside information about a major drug deal comes his way, he has some tough choices to make. Choices that could see him step outside the law.

Rob is an Englishman on a stag weekend with his pals and former best friend, visiting Prague to celebrate the former best friend's impending marriage to a girl Rob was previously in a relationship with and still loves. Not that the groom-to-be seems to care. He's knee deep in lap-dancers, booze and drugs.

Both worlds collide when the drug deal stumbles into the imploding stag weekend.

This is Prague. It could get messy.

== Bibliography ==
- Insatiable (2012)
- The Prize (2012)
