= Julia Lee (rugby league) =

English rugby league referee

Julia Lee MBE
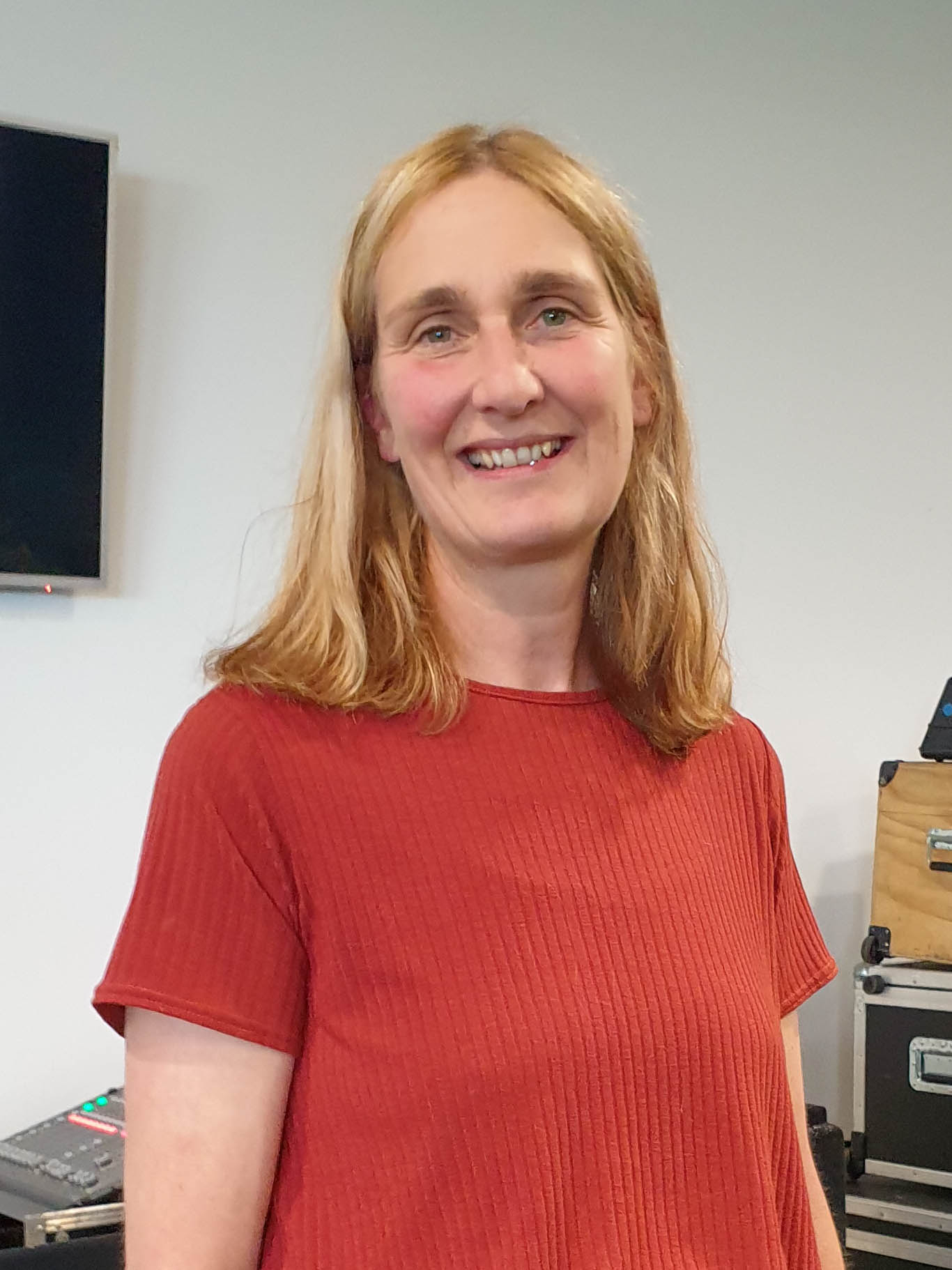
- Lee at a RLWC2021 impact event

Personal information
- Born: 1968 (age 56–57) Kingston upon Hull, East Riding of Yorkshire, England

Refereeing information
Years	Competition	Apps
	National Conference League

Julia Margaret Lee MBE is an English former rugby league referee and was the first woman to officiate men's rugby league games in the United Kingdom.

Lee was born in Hull, England in 1968 and grew up supporting Hull Kingston Rovers. She took up refereeing aged 17 after seeing an advert for referees in a match programme. After a friend bet her £5 that she wouldn't apply she did so but faced considerable resistance in being accepted due to her being a woman. Lee started by officiating at junior games but after moving to London she started officiating open-age games. After returning from a period in Australia, where she became the first woman to referee a game, she moved up the refereeing ranks and by 1990 was officiating games in the National Conference League Premier Division - the highest league in the amateur game - as well as games involving the reserve sides of professional clubs. Lee refereed her first professional game at Keighley Cougars during the 1993–94 season.

Injury forced her to retire in 2000 after she had refereed over 500 matches including the Oxford v Cambridge Varsity match and internationals in Australia and New Zealand.

Post-retirement Lee worked for the Rugby Football League as a director of community projects and events. Lee established her own life-coaching company, Common Sense Initiative, in 2017.

In 2018 Ref! a play written by Sarah Jane Dickenson and inspired by Lee's career premiered at Hull Kingston Rovers KCOM Stadium.
