= Thomas Wedders =

English sideshow performer

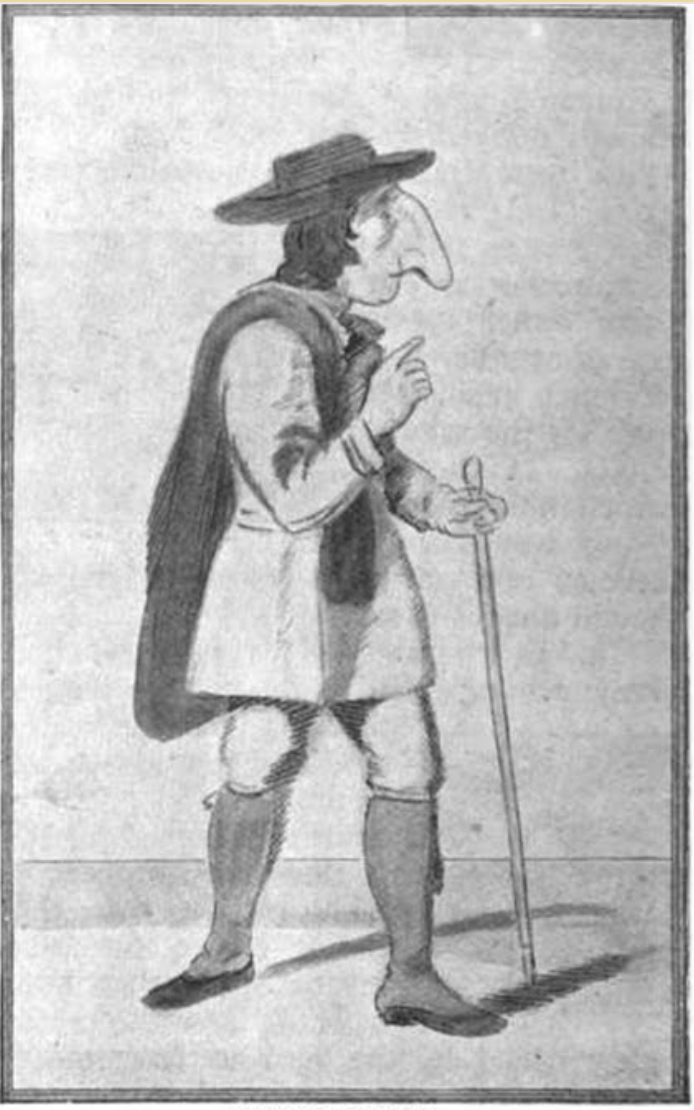
- Thomas Wedders as seen in The Strand Magazine in 1896
- Born: Thomas Wedders c. 1730; Yorkshire, England
- Died: c. 1780 (age 50–52)
- Occupation: Circus entertainer
- Known for: World's longest nose
- Parents: Dick Wedders (father); Hellen Wedders (née Georgeson) (mother)

Thomas Wedders, also known as Thomas Wadhouse, born in Yorkshire, England, c. 1730, was a performer in various circus sideshows in the mid-18th century. He is chiefly known for having the world's longest nose, allegedly measuring 20 cm (7.9 inches) long.

Beyond his large nose, little is known about Wedders' life.

Guinness World Records is unable to verify the length of Wedders' nose as he died before the invention of the camera. A wax reproduction of his head is in the Ripley's Believe It or Not! museum in London.

In 1896, The Strand Magazine elaborated:

Thus, if noses were ever uniformly exact in representing the importance of the individual, this worthy ought to have amassed all the money in Thread needle Street and conquered all Europe, for this prodigious nose of his was a compound of the acquisitive and the martial. But either his chin was too weak or his brow too low, or Nature had so exhausted herself in the task of giving this prodigy a nose as to altogether forget to endow him with brains; or perhaps the nose crowded out this latter commodity. At all events, we are told this Yorkshireman expired, nose and all, as he had lived, in a condition of mind best described as the most abject idiocy.
