= Lists of engineers =

Types of engineer include:

- Chartered Engineer
- European Engineer
- Incorporated Engineer
- Professional Engineer
- Royal Engineer

Lists of individual engineers by discipline include:

- List of aerospace engineers
- List of canal engineers
- List of chemical engineers
- List of civil engineers
- List of combat engineering corps
- List of electrical engineers
- List of environmental engineers
- List of genetic engineers
- List of industrial engineers
- List of mechanical engineers
- List of nuclear engineers
- List of software engineers
- List of roboticists
- List of structural engineers
- List of systems engineers

== See also ==
- List of Bangladeshi engineers
- List of British engineers
- List of computer scientists
- List of programmers
- List of inventors
- List of architects
- List of urban planners
- Lists of scientists
- List of fictional scientists and engineers
