= List of British engineers =

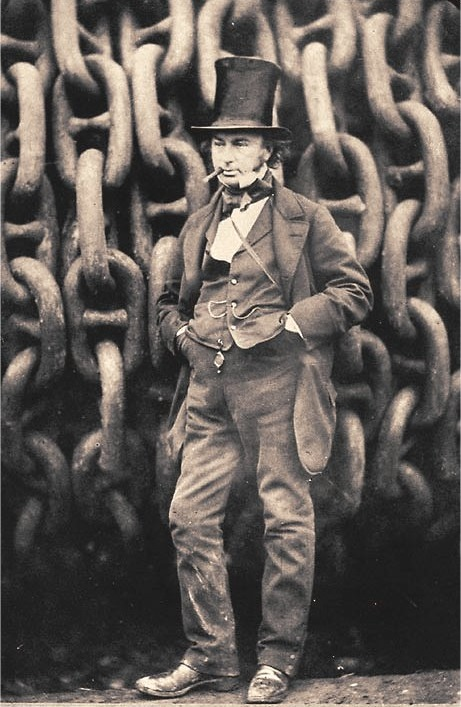
Isambard Kingdom Brunel whose works included the Great Western Railway and the Great Eastern

This is a historical list of British engineers.

== List ==
- John Allen (born 1928), engineer and plasma physicist
- James Atkinson (1846–1914), inventor of the Atkinson cycle internal combustion engine
- George Frederick Armstrong (1842–1900), sanitation engineer and academic
- William Armstrong (1810–1900), inventor of the hydraulic accumulator and breech-loading, rifled artillery
- Hertha Ayrton (1854–1923), pioneered the science of electric arcs and ripples in sand and water.
- Charles Baird (1766–1843), managed a company which built steam-powered machinery in Saint Petersburg, including Russia's first steamboat
- Edward Barlow (1639–1719), inventor of the repeating clock
- John Bell (1747–1798), inventor of various military and nautical devices, including a gyn and a petard
- Edwin Beard Budding (1796–1846), inventor of the lawnmower
- Jenny Body, aerospace engineer and former president of the Royal Aeronautical Society
- Matthew Boulton (1728–1809), partner in the steam engineering manufacturing firm Boulton and Watt, and inventor of a steam-driven coin press
- James Brindley (1716–1772), pioneering engineer of canals and aqueducts
- Isambard Kingdom Brunel (1806–1859), noted, among other achievements, for constructing the Clifton Suspension Bridge and the Great Western Railway
- Henry Chilver (1926–2012), expanded Cranfield Institute of Technology by focusing on the practical application of knowledge
- Victoria Drummond (1894–1978), marine engineer who served at sea as an engineering officer in the British Merchant Navy and received awards for bravery under enemy fire.
- Gertrude Lilian Entwisle (1892–1961), electrical engineer known for her work on designing DC motors and exciters and one of the founding members of the Women's Engineering Society.
- Nigel Gresley (1876–1941), chief engineer of the London and North Eastern Railway who invented the Gresley conjugated valve gear
- Holt Samuel Hallett (1841 – 11 November 1911), pioneer railway engineer in Burma
- Caroline Haslett (1895–1957), electrical engineer who oversaw important requirements for electrical installations in post-war Britain
- Oliver Heaviside (1850–1925), electrical engineer, mathematician, and physicist who developed the transmission line theory and vectorized Maxwell's equations, among many other things.
- Christopher Hinton (1901–1983), chief engineer at ICI who worked on the first nuclear power plant, Calder Hall
- Peggy Hodges (1921–2008), communications and systems engineer who worked on guided missile technology at GEC Marconi
- Sue Ion (born 1955), expert advisor on the nuclear power industry
- Andrew Meikle (1719–1811), inventor of an innovative mechanical threshing machine
- Rachel Mary Parsons (1885–1956), engineer and advocate for women's employment rights, was the founding president of the Women's Engineering Society in Britain.
- Lewis Paul (died 1759), inventor of spinning and weaving machines
- Dorothée Pullinger (1894–1986), pioneering automobile engineer and businesswoman
- Harry Ricardo (1885–1974), researcher and developer of early internal combustion engines
- Margaret Dorothea Rowbotham (1883–1978), engineer in the automobile, munitions and electrical sectors, and champion of women's employment in professional engineering
- Dorothy Rowntree, first woman graduate in engineering from the University of Glasgow and the first woman graduate in naval architecture in UK
- Evelyn Roxburgh (1896–1973), first woman to gain a diploma in electrical engineering in Scotland.
- Thomas Savery (c.1650–1715), first person to patent a steam-powered device
- Beatrice Shilling (1909–1990), inventor of the "Miss Shilling's orifice", a critical component that prevented engine stall in the Rolls-Royce Merlin engines of the Hawker Hurricane and Supermarine Spitfire fighters.
- Dorothy Spicer (1908–1946), aviator and the first woman to gain an advanced qualification in aeronautical engineering
- Richard Trevithick (1771–1833), inventor of a high-powered steam engine
- Claude Hamilton Verity (1880–1949), inventor of the Veritiphone, one of the earliest methods of synchronisation of sound and film.
- Frank Whittle (1907–1996), credited with single-handedly inventing the turbojet engine.
