= Combat engineer =

Soldier who performs military engineering

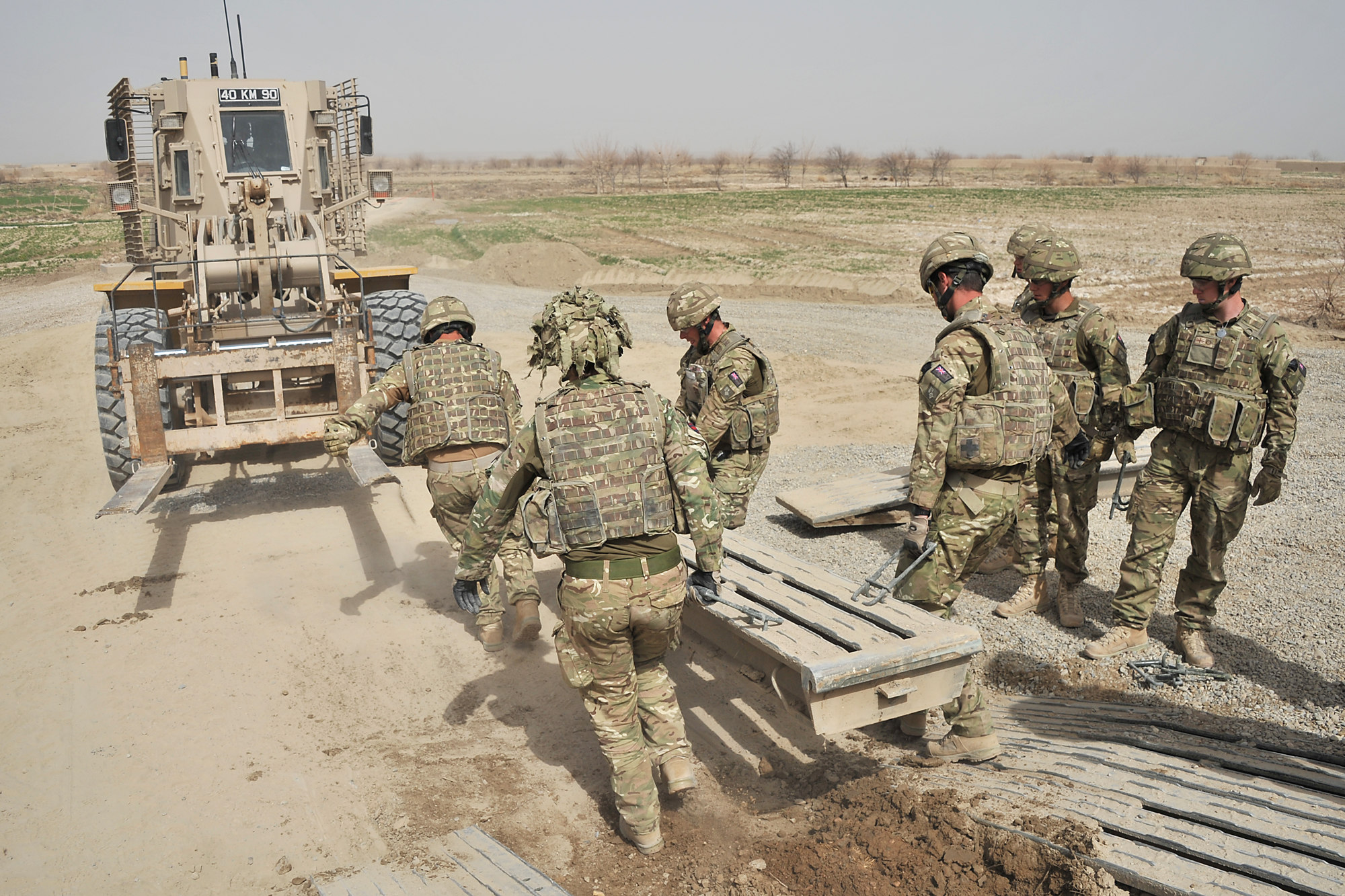
Royal Engineers preparing site for a bridge in Afghanistan.

A combat engineer (also called pioneer or sapper) is a type of soldier who performs military engineering tasks in support of land forces combat operations. Combat engineers perform a variety of military engineering, tunnel and mine warfare tasks, as well as construction and demolition duties in and out of combat zones.

Combat engineers facilitate the mobility of friendly forces while impeding that of the enemy. They also work to assure the survivability of friendly forces, building fighting positions, fortifications, and roads. They conduct demolition missions and clear minefields manually or through use of specialized vehicles. Common combat engineer missions include construction and breaching of trenches, tank traps and other obstacles and fortifications; obstacle emplacement and bunker construction; route clearance and reconnaissance; bridge and road construction or destruction; emplacement and clearance of land mines; and combined arms breaching. Typically, combat engineers are also trained in infantry tactics and, when required, serve as provisional infantry.

== Combat engineer organization ==
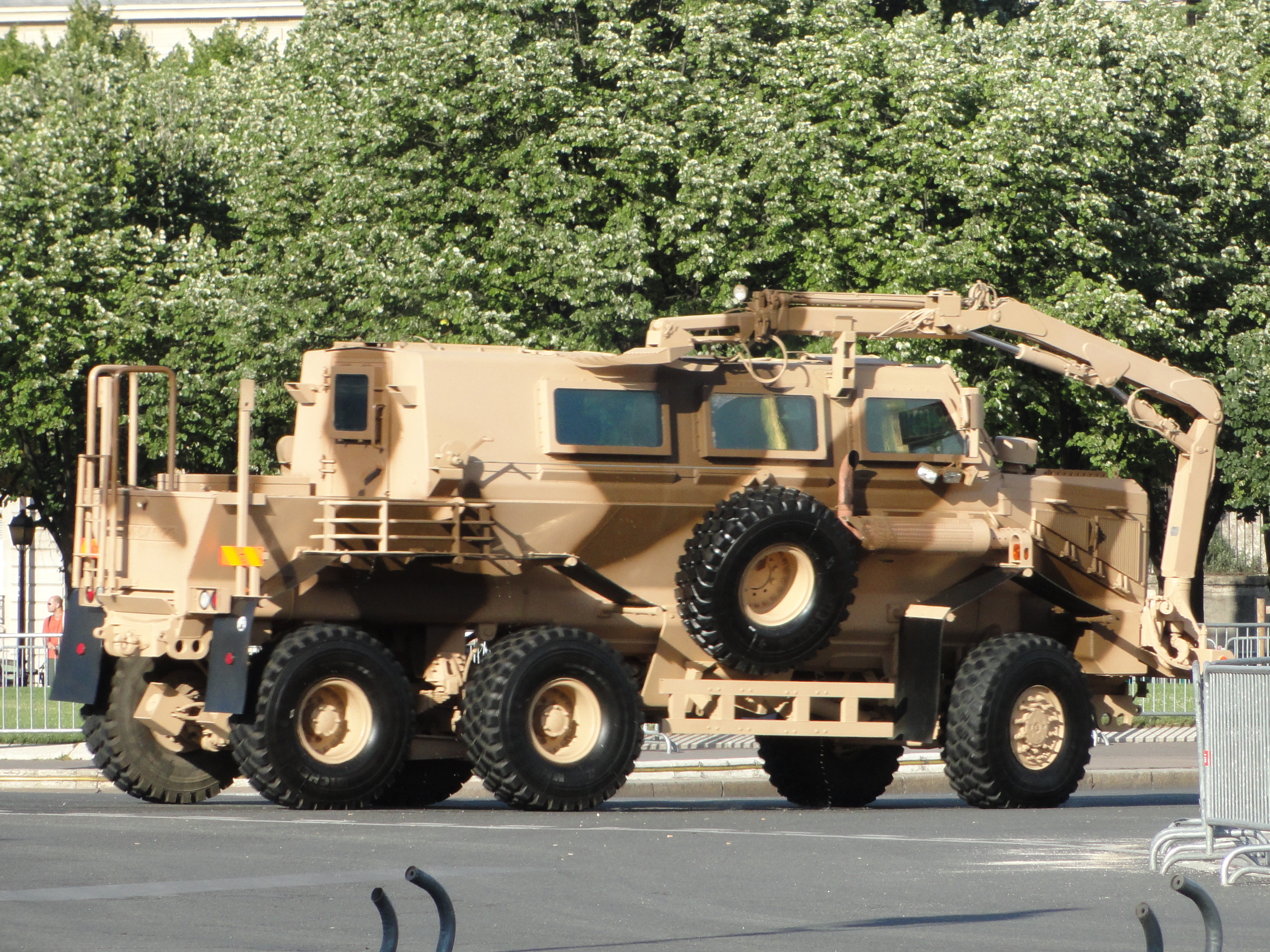
Buffalo MRAP (Mine Resistant Ambush Protected Vehicle), a common vehicle used to uncover improvised explosive devices (IEDs) by combat engineer units.

Combat engineers play a key role in all armed forces of the world. They are invariably found closely integrated into the force structure of divisions, combat brigades, and smaller fighting units.

=== Combat support formations ===
In many countries, combat engineers provide combat support members of a broader military engineering corps or branch. Other nations have distinct combat engineering corps or branches; they are separate from other types of military engineers. The Danish military engineers' corps, for example, is almost entirely organized into one regiment of combat engineers, simply named Ingeniørregimentet ("The Engineering Regiment").

=== Combat arms formations ===
Combat engineer battalions are usually a part of a brigade combat team. During the War in Afghanistan and the 2003–2011 Iraq War, the U.S. Army tasked its combat engineers with route clearance missions designed to counter rising threats of improvised explosive devices (IEDs). To increase the effectiveness of these units, EOD and mechanic teams were typically embedded with the combat engineer platoon. Due to rising IED threats, the U.S. Army sends some combat engineers to complete Explosive Ordnance Clearance Agent training.

=== Special operations units ===
Individual combat engineers are often assigned as a component of both covert and overt direct action special operations teams. For example, the active duty US Army Special Forces and its two reserve components, the 19th SFG and 20th SFG of the US Army National Guard, employ combat engineer sergeants designated by MOS 18C. A Green Berets Operational Detachment Alpha, more commonly known as an "A-Team", typically consists of 12 men, two of whom are combat engineer sergeants.

Another example is the Israeli Yahalom unit, which is a special operations engineering unit that possess sabotage, explosives demolition and tunnel warfare capabilities.

== Terminology ==
A general combat engineer is often called a pioneer or sapper, terms derived respectively from the French and British armies. In some armies, pioneer and sapper indicate specific military ranks and levels of combat engineers, who work under fire in all seasons and may be allocated to different corps, as they were in the former Soviet Army, or they may be organized in the same corps. Geomatics (surveying and cartography) is another area of military engineering but is often performed by the combat engineers of some nations and in other cases is a separate responsibility, as was formerly the case in the Australian Army. While the officers of a combat engineer unit may be professionally certified civil or mechanical engineers, the non-commissioned members are generally not.

=== Sapper ===
Explosives and Demolitions: Bangalore Torpedoes (1944) De-classified U.S. Army Bangalore high-explosives combat engineer training film reel.

In the British, Indian, Canadian, Australian, and New Zealand armies, a sapper is a soldier who has specialized combat engineer training. The term "sapper" in the U.S. Army refers to a person who either possesses the combat engineer military occupational specialty or who has graduated from the Sapper Leader Course, more commonly called "Sapper School." In Sapper School, volunteers from the ranks of combat engineers and other military occupational specialties (most of whom serve in the combat arms) undergo training in combat engineer and infantry battle drills, expedient demolitions, threat weapons, unarmed combat, mountaineering, and water operations. Some of the training in this 28-day course, arguably one of the most challenging in the U.S. Army, features covert infiltration techniques or survival skills.

In the Israeli Defense Forces, sapper (פלס) is a military profession code denoting a combat engineer who has graduated from various levels of combat engineering training. Sapper 05 is the basic level, Sapper 06 is the general level, Sapper 08 is the combat engineer commander's level, and Sapper 11 is the combat engineer officer level. All IDF sappers are also trained as Rifleman 07, matching infantry.

In the Canadian Army, it is a term for soldiers that have completed the basic Combat Engineer training.

In the Portuguese Army, a sapador de engenharia (engineering sapper) is a soldier of the engineering branch that has specialized combat engineer training. A sapador de infantaria (infantry sapper) is a soldier of the infantry branch that has a similar training and that usually serves in the combat support sapper platoon of an infantry battalion.

The Italian Army uses the term guastatori for their combat engineers.

=== Pioneer ===
In the Finnish army, pioneeri is the private equivalent rank in the army for a soldier who has completed the basic combat engineering training. Naval engineers retain the rank matruusi but bear the pioneeri insignia on their sleeves.

The German Bundeswehr uses the term Pionier for their combat engineers and other specialized units, who are associated with Special Forces to clear obstacles and perform engineering duties. Also the combat engineers in the Austro-Hungarian k.u.k. Forces were called "Pioniere".

=== Assault pioneer ===
In the British, Canadian, Australian and New Zealand armies, an assault pioneer is an infantry soldier with some limited combat engineer training in clearing obstacles during assaults and light engineering duties. Until recently, assault pioneers were responsible for the operation of flamethrowers.

=== Field engineer ===
Field engineer is a term used (or formerly used) in many Commonwealth armies. In modern usage, it is often synonymous with combat engineer. However, the term originally identified those military engineers who supported an army operating in the field instead of garrison engineers who built and supported permanent fixed bases. In its original usage, "field engineering" would have been inclusive of but broader than "combat engineering."

=== Specialisations ===
Sappers specialising in tunnel warfare may be known as miners.

In the French Army, combat engineers specialising in bridge-building are called pontoniers, while in the Italian Army, combat engineers specialising in bridge-building are called pontieri.

== Practices and techniques ==
Demolition Part II - Electric Priming (1957) - Official U.S. Army combat engineer demolition training film reel.

Combat engineers are force multipliers and enhance the survival of other troops through the use and practice of camouflage, reconnaissance, communications and other services. These include the construction of roads, bridges, field fortifications, obstacles and the construction and operation of water supplies. In these roles, combat engineers use a wide variety of hand and power tools. They are also responsible for construction rigging, the use of explosives, and the carrying out of demolitions, obstacle clearance, and obstacle construction, assault of fortifications, use of assault boats in water obstacle crossings, helipad construction, general construction, route reconnaissance and road reconnaissance, and erecting communication installations. Combat engineers build and run water distribution points, carrying out water filtration, and NBC decontamination when necessary, and storage prior to distribution.

All these role activities and technologies are divided into several areas of combat engineering:

=== Mobility ===
Improving the ability of one's own force to move around the battlefield. Combat engineers typically support this role through reduction of enemy obstacles which include point and row minefields, anti-tank ditches, wire obstacles, concrete, and metal anti-vehicle barriers, and improvised explosive devices (IED) and wall and door breaching in urban terrain. Mechanized combat engineer units also have armored vehicles capable of laying short bridges for limited gap-crossing.

- Clearing terrain obstacles
- Overcoming trenches and ditches
- Opening routes for armored fighting vehicles
- Constructing roads and bridges
- Route clearance

=== Countermobility ===
Building obstacles to prevent the enemy from moving around the battlefield. Destroying bridges, blocking roads, creating airstrips, digging trenches, etc. Can also include planting land mines and anti-handling devices when authorized and directed to do so.

When the defender must retreat it is often desirable to destroy anything that may be of use to the enemy, particularly bridges, as their destruction can slow the advance of the attackers.

- Planting land mines
- Digging trenches and ditches
- Demolishing roads and bridges

=== Explosive material handling ===
The placement of land mines to create minefields and their maintenance and removal.

- Clearing fields of land mines
- Demolition

=== Assault ===
- Opening routes during an assault
- Demolishing enemy structures (using bulldozers or explosive charges).

=== Defense structures ===
Building structures which enable one's own soldiers to survive on the battlefield. Examples include trenches, bunkers, shelters, and armored vehicle fighting positions.

Defensive fortifications are designed to prevent intrusion into the inner works by infantry. For minor defensive locations, these may only consist of simple walls and ditches. The design principle is to slow down the advance of attackers to where they can be destroyed by defenders from sheltered positions. Most large fortifications are not a single structure but rather a concentric series of fortifications of increasing strength.

- Building fortifications
- Building outposts
- Building fences
- Defense against WMD weapon threats

== Equipment and vehicles ==
Combat engineers employ a wide range of transportation vehicles and equipment and use weapons unique to the engineers, including those used in land mine warfare.

=== Basic tooling ===
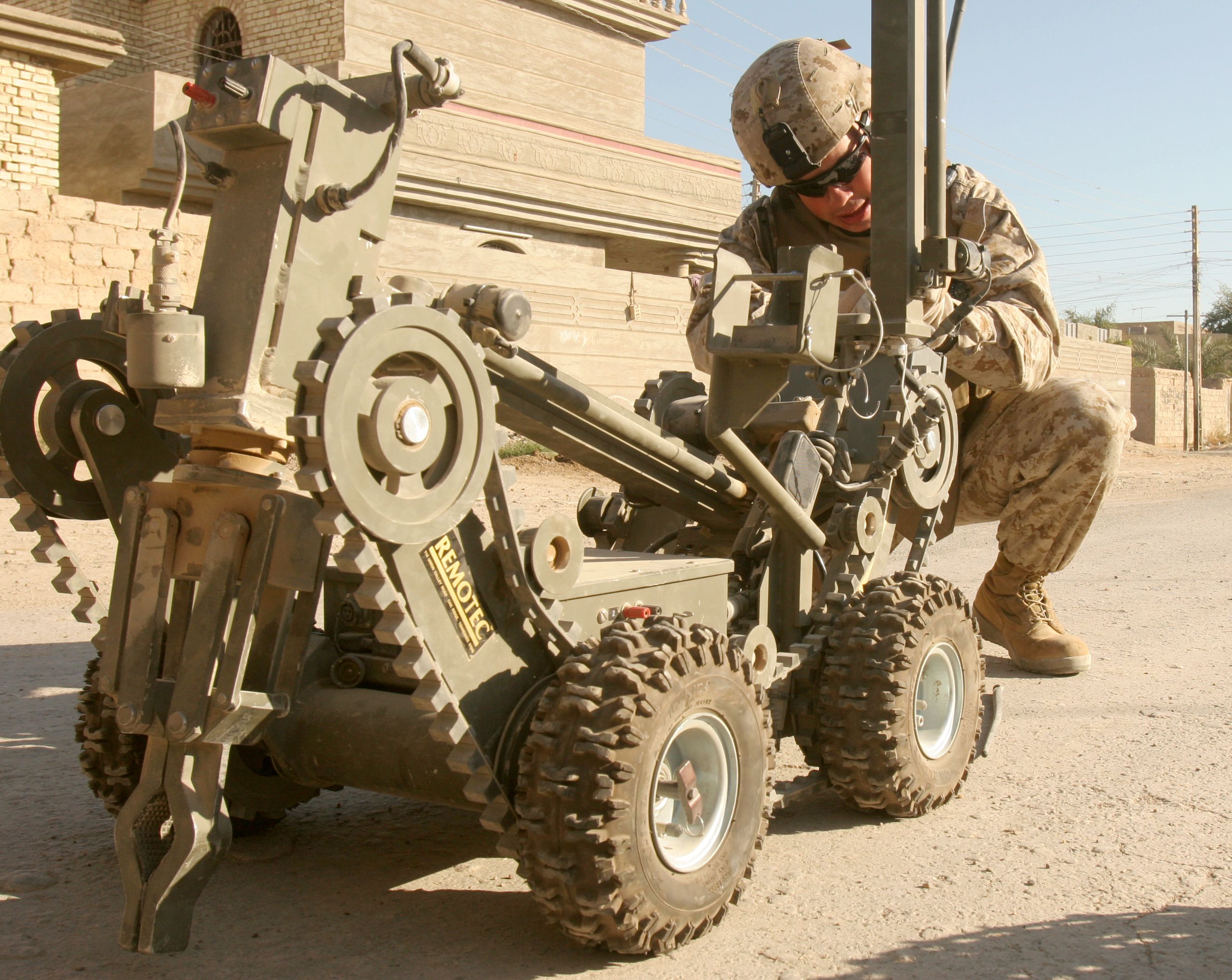
IED detonator in Iraq

Basic combat engineering tools include safe use of:

- driving tools and chopping tools (hammers, mauls, sledges, screwdriver, and bits)
- cutting tools and smoothing tools (saws, chisels, planes, files and rasps, brush-cutting tools, miscellaneous cutting tools)
- drilling tools, boring tools, and countersinking tools
- measuring tools, leveling tools and layout tools (rules, tapes, marking tools, levels, plumb bobs, squares)
- gripping tools, prying tools, and twisting tools (pliers, wrenches, bars)
- holding tools, raising tools, and grinding tools (vises, clamps, jacks, grinders, and oilstones)
- timber handling tools and climbing tools; digging tools (shovels, posthole diggers, picks, and mattocks)
- portable power tools and trailer-mounted tools (electric tool trailer and generator, portable power tools)
- miscellaneous tools.

=== Vehicles ===
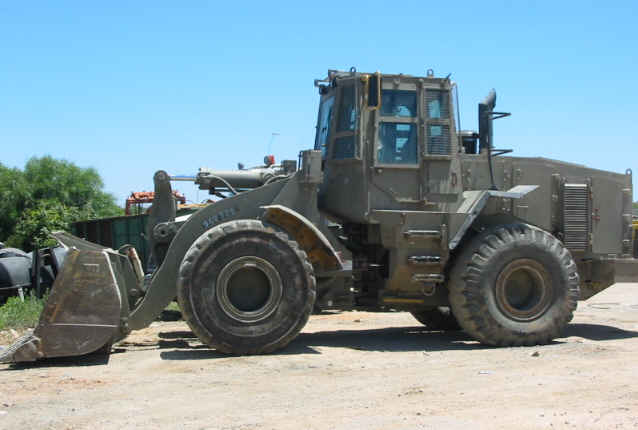
Armored front loader

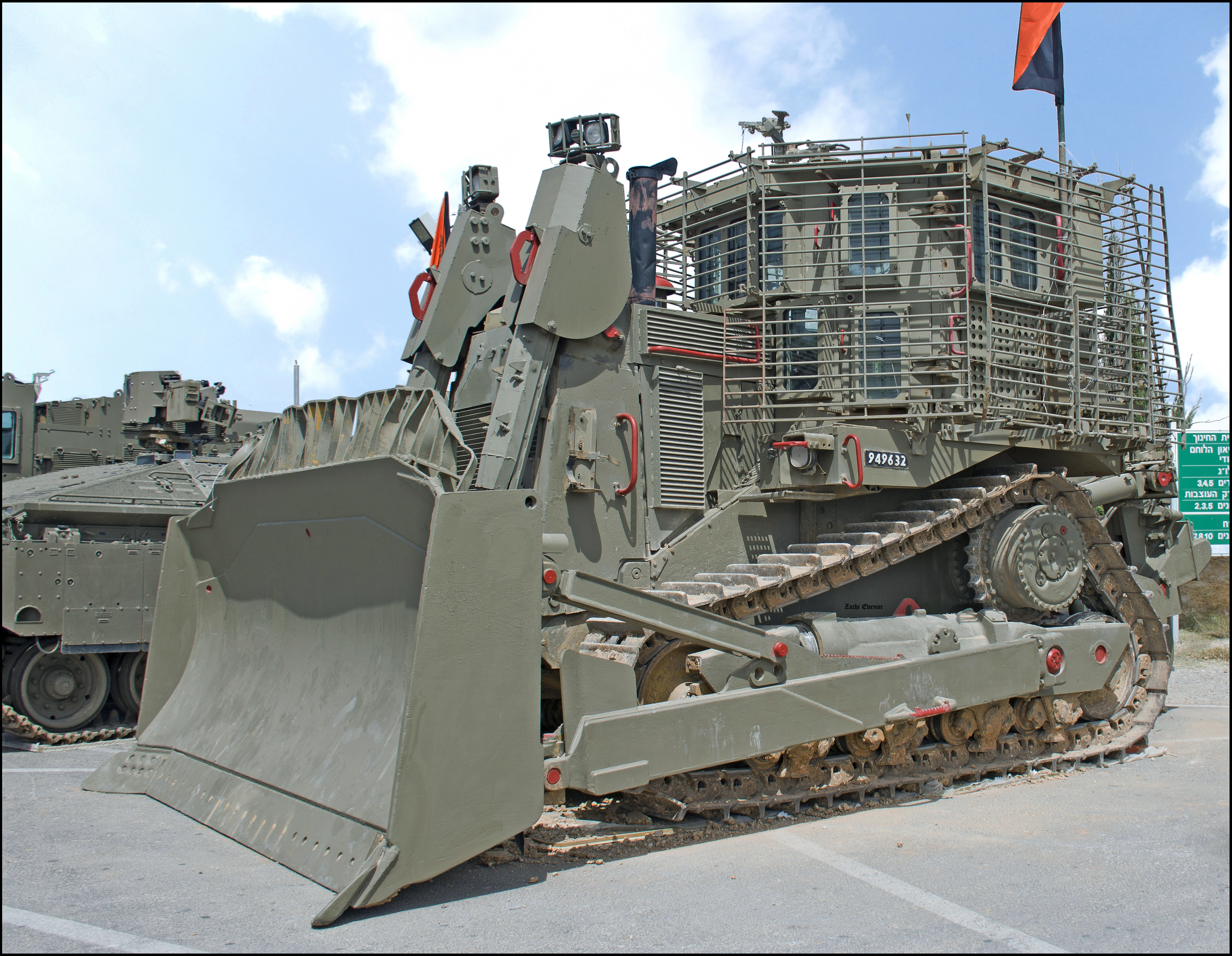
The IDF Caterpillar D9 armored bulldozer is used for a variety of combat engineering tasks, including opening routes, demolishing structures, digging antivehicular ditches, and constructing vehicle fighting positions.

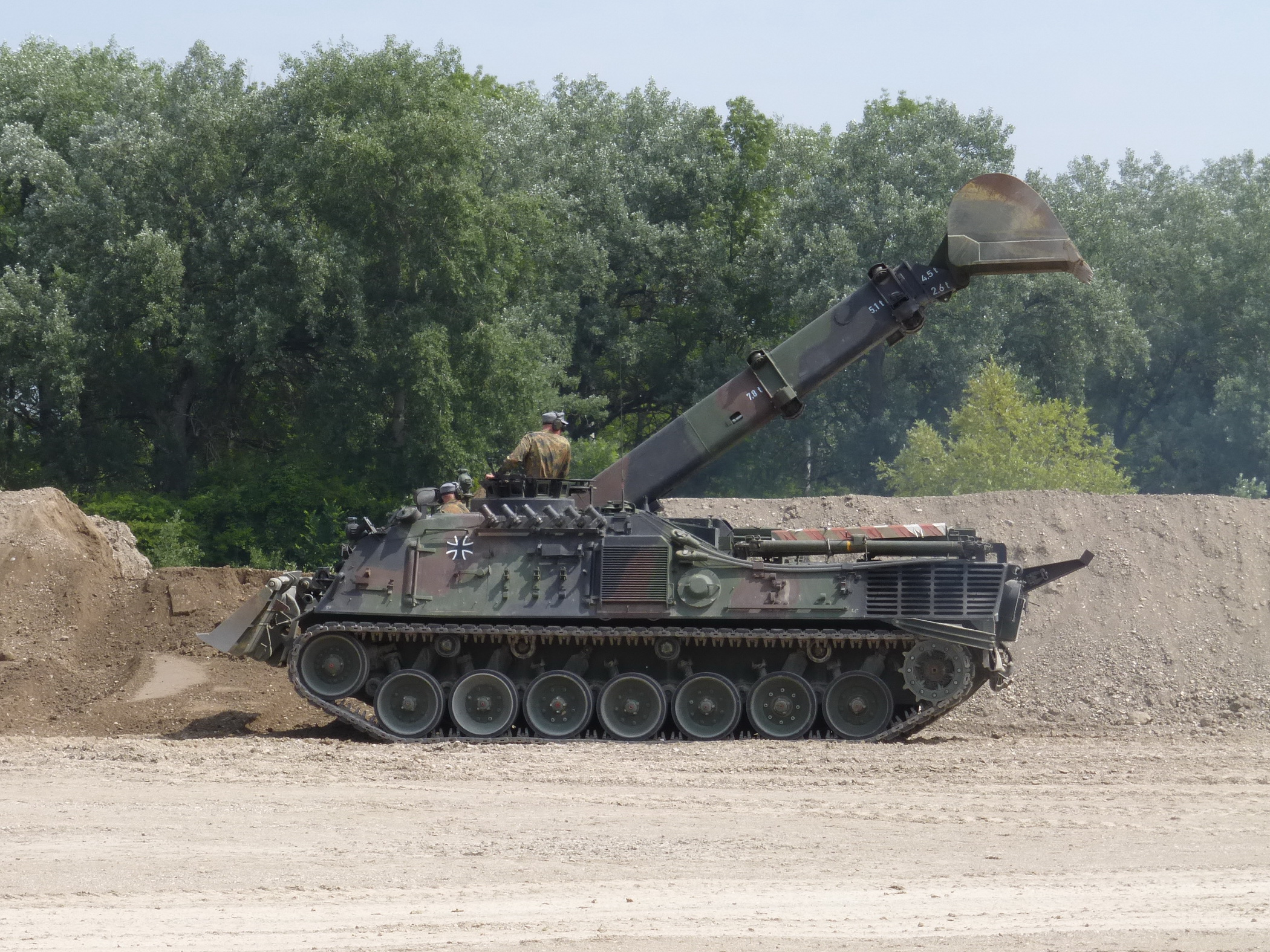
German Army combat engineer vehicle Dachs

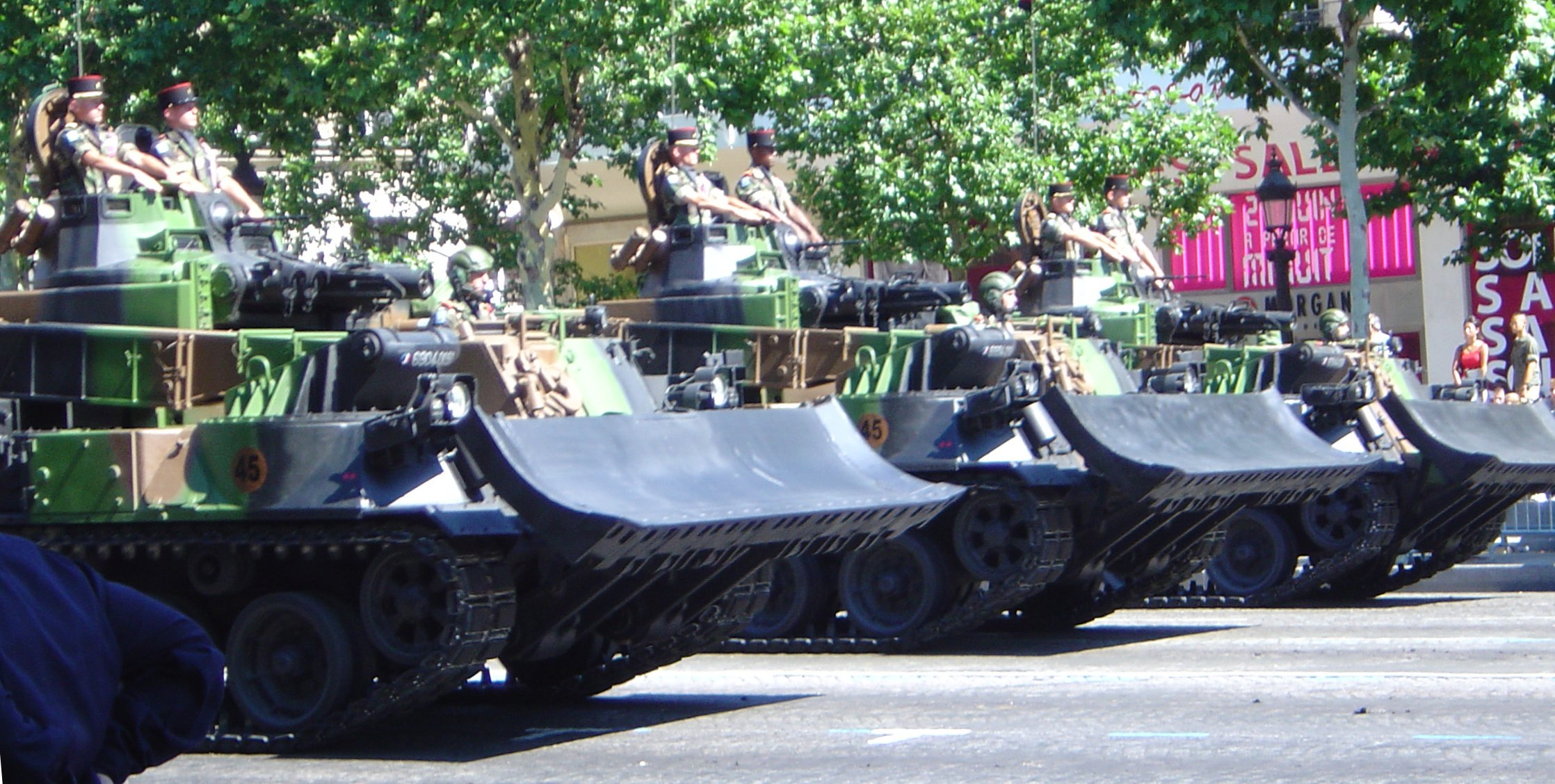
This EBG combat engineering vehicle is used by the engineers of the French Army (as well as the British army) for a variety of missions

=== Obstacle breaching ===
For obstacle breaching, including minefields, the combat engineers use a variety of vehicles, explosive devices, and plastic explosives including:

- Minefield breaching devices
  - Dozer blade
  - Mine rollers
  - Bangalore torpedo
  - Antipersonnel Obstacle Breaching System
  - Mine-clearing line charge (MICLIC)
- Bomb disposal robots
- Explosives, mines, and bombs
- Field-deployable bridges, for example, French EFA and Bailey bridge.

== Historical publications ==
The Basic Field Manual, Engineer Soldier's Handbook, 2 June 1943 (FM 21-105) was written to provide guidance to a new combat engineer in the United States.

== See also ==
- 17th Armored Engineer Battalion
- Booby trap – devices combat engineers emplace and clear
- Door breaching – mechanical and explosive breach techniques
- Engineer Combat Battalion
- List of combat engineering corps
- Military engineering
- Sapping – siege trenching used for undermining fortifications
- TNT – trinitrotoluene, the standard military demolition explosive
