= EFA (mobile bridge) =

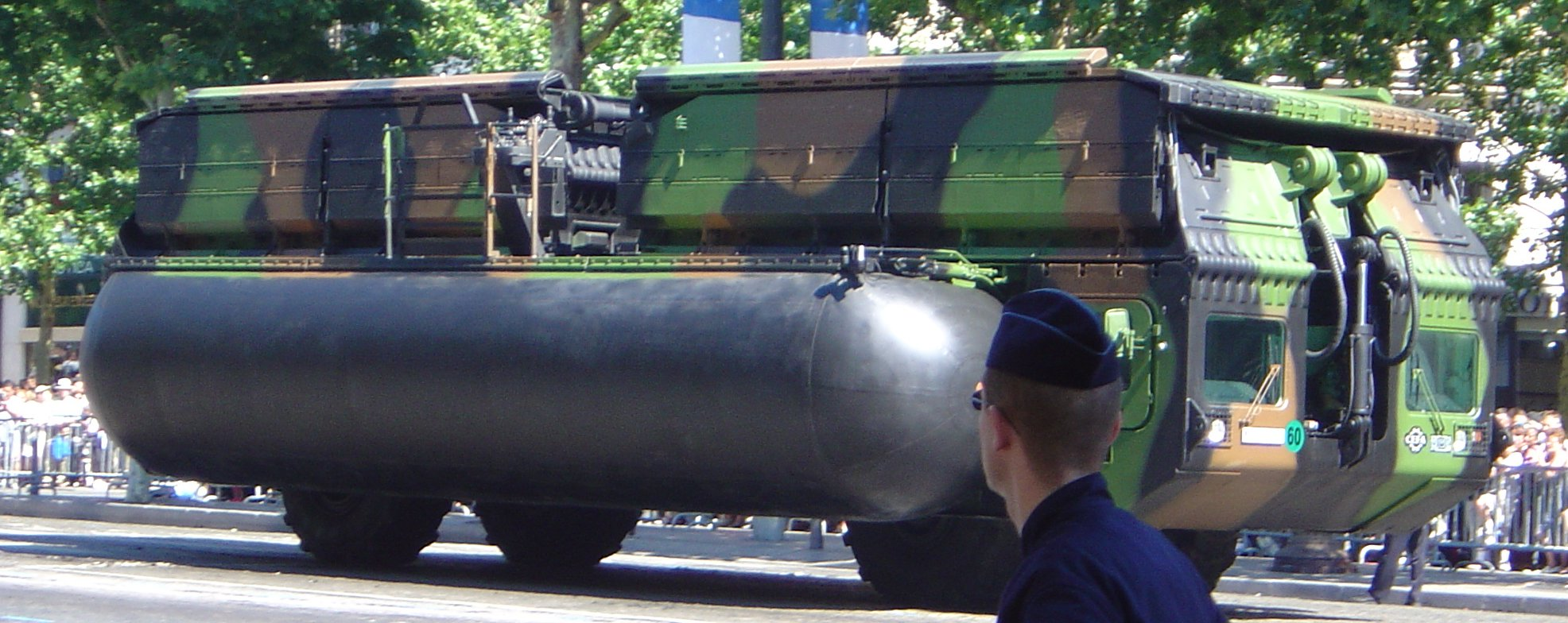
- The EFA in road-going mode.
- Type: Amphibious float bridge
- Place of origin: France

Service history
- In service: 1993–present

Production history
- Manufacturer: Chaudronnerie et Forges d'Alsace (CEFA)

Specifications
- Length: 34.55 meters
- Armour: none

The EFA or Engin de Franchissement de l'Avant (forward crossing apparatus) is a field-deployable river crossing vehicle, used by combat engineers in the French Army. Unlike a bridge layer, which transports a bridge that is deployed off of the host vehicle, the EFA itself is a combined pontoon bridge and amphibious vehicle, enabling much more rapid redeployment of the mobile bridge structure and an additional use as a ferry (at the cost of being useless in returning to service damaged bridges). When needed, multiple EFA's can be combined in a series to create a traditional pontoon bridge. It has been built since 1989 by Chaudronnerie et Forges d'Alsace (CEFA), located in Soultz-sous-Forêts in the Bas-Rhin.

== Characteristics ==
A single EFA, in ferry configuration, has a length of 34.55m on a loading surface of 96 m^{2} is ready in less than five minutes for the transportation of up to 70 tons of goods. In one hour it is able to make about 10-12 crossings over a of 100m length and eight to 10 crossings over a length of 200 m. Two EFA coupled together at the ramp allow the carriage of up to 150 ton cargo, and a floating bridge with four EFA for example offers, in less than 10 minutes, a crossing capacity of 100 m long with an estimated flow of 200 vehicles an hour.

The EFA is capable of astern propulsion, thus allowing fording without having to reorient the direction of the vehicle to the opposite shore which allows for more fluid ferry operations and rapid bridge assembly.

The crew consists of four people:

- An equipment commander
- A driver
- A pilot
- A crewman

== Predecessor ==
The EFA is the heir to the first self-propelled bridging ferry invented in 1955 by the French military engineer and general Jean Gillois (born in Châteaubriant 1909). Called the "Amphibious Bac" or "Gillois", it entered service with the French army in 1963. A version modified by EWK was successively adopted by the German, British and to a limited extent American militaries, and was used by Israel in the 1973 Yom Kippur War. At the time of its introduction it was able to carry vehicles up to a maximum weight of 25 tons and while configured as a bridge it could support loads of about 50 tons. It takes between 45 and 65 minutes to form a bridge 100 meters long. It allows an armed force to avoid the heavy and bulky convoys that barges brought in by road, which are sensitive to enemy attacks.

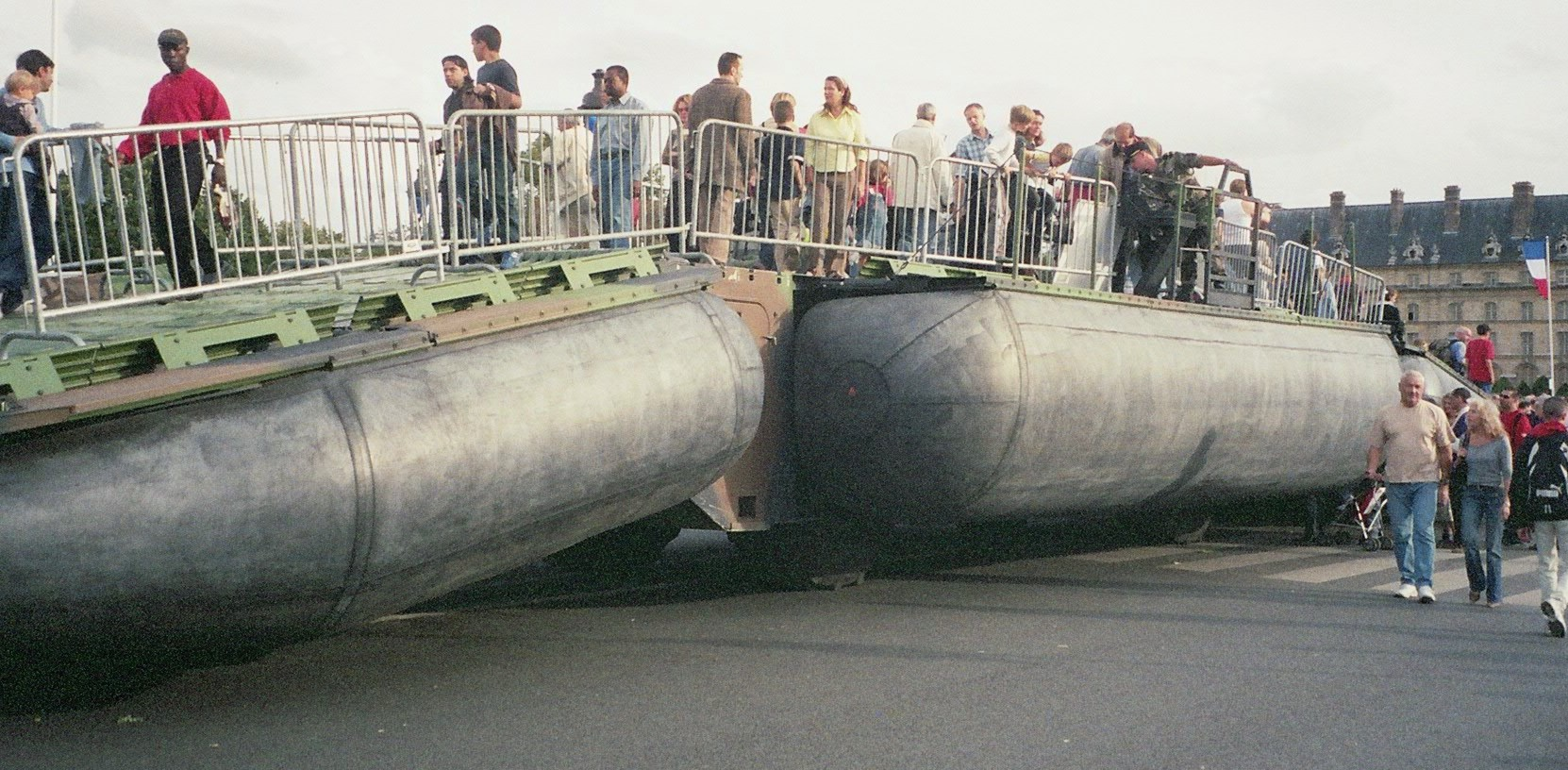
Deployed EFA

== Users ==
- United Arab Emirates: Contract for 10 units of more than 60 million euros signed in 2006 for EFA X1 motorized with Friedrichshafen MTU of 760 hp. Delivery from September 2008
- France: 39 units built for the French army since 1989, in active service since 1993. As of December 31, 2013, 30 units were in service with an average age of 25 years. They are assigned to the following units:
  - 3rd engineer regiment,
  - 6th engineer regiment,
  - 19th engineer regiment,
  - School of Engineering,
  - Champagne Training Park.

The three EFA sections are theoretically equipped with four groups of two vehicles, i.e. eight EFA per regiment. In practice, by 2014 it would seem that there were only four AETs per regiment, the rest being distributed between the Engineering School, the Training Park and the industrial owner of the conditioning contract.

- Ukraine

== See also ==
- Bailey bridge
- Pontoon bridge
- Armoured vehicle-launched bridge
