= List of combat engineering corps =

In many countries, combat engineers are members of broader military engineering corps or branches. Examples of this include:

- (Australia) Royal Australian Engineers
- (Canada) Canadian Military Engineers
- (Estonia) Pioneeripataljon
- (India) Indian Army Corps of Engineers
- (Indonesia) Indonesian Army Corps of Engineers
- (Iran) Jihad of Construction (defunct)
- (Republic of Ireland) Engineer Corps (Ireland)
- Royal Army Engineers Regiment (Malaysia)
- (Israel) Combat Engineering Corps
- Corps of Royal New Zealand Engineers
- Pakistan Army Corps of Engineers
- (Russia) Russian Engineer Troops
- Sri Lanka Engineers
- (United Kingdom) Royal Engineers
- United States Army Corps of Engineers
- United States Navy Seabee
- United States Air Force RED HORSE
- United States Marine Corps Combat Engineers
- (South Africa) South African Engineer Corps
- (Finland) Engineers (Finnish Defence Forces)
