= Holt Samuel Hallett =

British railway engineer (1841-1911)

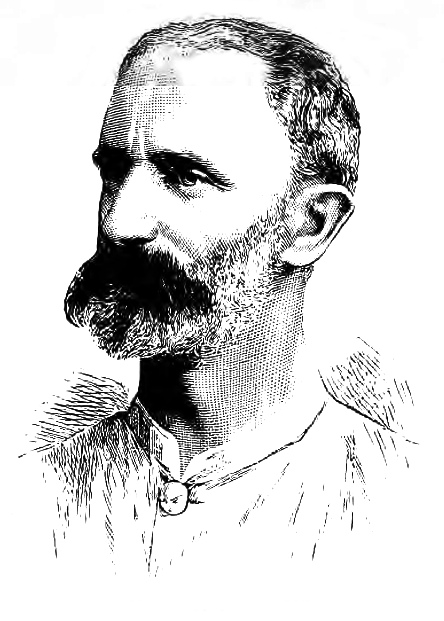
- Born: 1841
- Died: 11 November 1911 (aged 69–70); London
- Occupation: Engineer
- Known for: Railway pioneer in Burma

Holt Samuel Hallett (1841 – 11 November 1911) was a British pioneer railway engineer in Burma.

== Early life and education ==
Holt Samuel Hallett, born in 1841, was the son of Perham Hallett of Lincoln’s Inn, and was educated at Charterhouse and Kensington School. He was articled to William Baker, Chief Engineer to the London and North Western Railways.

== Career ==
After completing his training, Hallett assisted in the construction of railways in Lancashire and Cheshire.

In 1868, he entered the India Public Works Department and was posted to Burma where he worked on the construction of the rail line from Rangoon to Prome. The province’s oldest line, it was 161 miles in length and was completed in 1877.

In 1879, he retired from government service with the rank of Executive Engineer and devoted himself to the promotion of a scheme to build a railway linking Burma and China. Together with Archibald Colquhoun, a colonial official in Burma, they proposed that the railway would further British political and commercial interests in China and Siam by opening markets in Southwestern China, and would serve to counter French activity in the region.

Between 1883 and 1890, Hallett explored and surveyed about 2,500 miles of little known country in China and Siam for a railway route, and wrote an account of his travels for the Royal Geographical Society which was later published in a book “A Thousand Miles on an Elephant in the Shan States” (1890). He discovered sources of the Maenem and was consulted on railway matters by the King of Siam. He and Colquhoun submitted a report on the proposed railway connection between Burma and China to the British government and commercial interests in Britain, and they travelled around Britain to promote the scheme, speaking at Chambers of Commerce and to public bodies.

Hallett and Colquhoun’s Burma-China railway scheme received favourable support from commercial interests who saw untapped markets in Southwestern China for their goods. Privately, they continued to lobby the government to back the scheme, proposing that it construct the rail line as a state enterprise, or give state guarantees to companies prepared to undertake the construction. However, the government refused to finance it, the prime minister, Lord Salisbury, saying furthermore that the government could not give guarantees for rail extensions beyond its territorial and political frontiers. The scheme was dropped, but would have much to do with the later extension of the Burmese railway line from Mandalay, northeast towards the Chinese frontier.

After the rejection of his railway extension proposal, Hallett worked as a publicist, contributing to journals and reviews on economic and financial matters connected with the British Empire in the East. Such publications included: “Development of Our Eastern Markets”; "Indian Taxation, Ancient and Modern" “The Extension of Indian Railways”, and “India and her Neighbours”. He took up the cause of factory workers in India, who were mostly unprotected, which contributed to the introduction of legislation restricting working hours, and also supported opposition in Britain to import duties imposed on cotton goods brought into India.

Hallett died in London on 11 November 1911.
