= List of Bangladeshi engineers =

This is a list of notable Bangladeshi engineers.

== A ==
- Atiqul Islam Rizvi

== F ==
- Fazlur Rahman Khan

== I ==
- Iqbal Mahmud

== J ==
- Jamilur Reza Choudhury

== K ==
- Khondkar Siddique-e-Rabbani

== M ==
- Muhammad M. Hussain
- M. Rezwan Khan
- Mahmudur Rahman
- Muhammad Shahid Sarwar

== S ==
- Sunny Sanwar
