= Claude Hamilton Verity =

English inventor

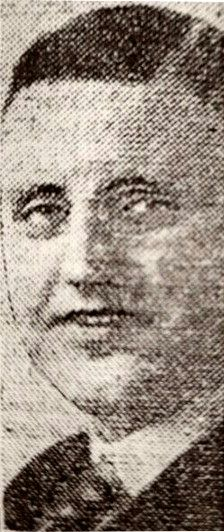
- Verity, in 1922
- Born: Claud Hamilton Verity; 1 May 1880; Leeds, West Riding of Yorkshire, England
- Died: 15 August 1949 (aged 69); Newton Abbot, Devon
- Occupations: engineer; inventor; hardware merchant

Signature
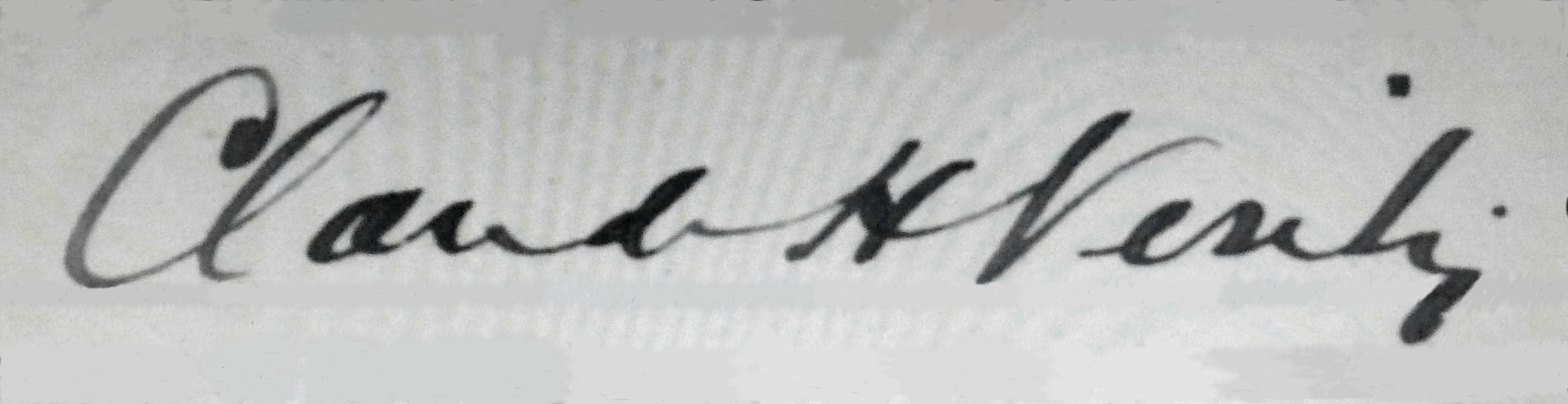

Claude Hamilton Verity (1 May 1880 – 15 August 1949) was an English hardware merchant, sound engineer and inventor, working mainly in Harrogate and Leeds, England. He was one of the earliest inventors of methods of synchronisation of sound with silent films. For that purpose, and working alone, he invented the Veritiphone, a sound box which could be operated by staff in cinema projection rooms. In the 1920s he demonstrated his invention in various locations in England, and also in New York for the Vitagraph Company of America.

== Background ==
Claude Hamilton Verity came from a Yorkshire family. His grandfather was railway ganger and stonemason Charles Verity, (Note: Charles Verity (27 August 1814 – 4 December 1899). GRO index: Deaths Dec 1899 Verity Charles 85 Doncaster 9c 495.) "a man of comparatively little education" who recalled "the days when he went from town to town in search of work, with his tools on his back, [and] the humble meals he was wont to eat under the shelter of the friendly hedge". He rose to be a wealthy contractor, building bridges and houses, and became mayor of Doncaster.

One of Verity's uncles was Charles Henry Verity, (Note: Charles Henry Verity (1841 – 20 February 1899). GRO index: Births Sep 1841 Verity Charles Henry Wakefield XXII 638. Deaths Mar 1899 Verity Charles Henry 57 Bridlington 9d 218.) who, according to the South Yorkshire Times and Mexborough and Swinton Times completed his apprenticeship as an engineer at Manchester. He joined his father in railway and viaduct construction, then constructed the wagon building and repairing sheds in White Lee Road, Mexborough, purchased land, and built the wheel works. For over thirty years, he was "owner of the Swinton Wagon and Railway Wheel works" according to the Sheffield Independent, and "principal in the firm of Verity & Son, wheel, tire (sic), and axle manufacturers at Swinton" as reported by the Bridlington and Quay Gazette. Another uncle was ironmonger Joshua Marland "Fred" Verity, (Note: Joshua Marland "Fred" Verity (11 April 1847 – 9 February 1897). GRO index: Births Jun 1847 Verity Joshua Marland. Stanley, Wakefield XXII 682. Deaths Mar 1897 Verity Joshua Marland 49. Leeds 9b 384. He married Mary Heptinstall in Kirk Bramwith, 12 June 1872. Buried at Lawnswood Cemetery, Leeds) who started the family hardware manufacturing and wholesale business Fred Verity & Son at 174-178 Lower Briggate and 60-68 Call Lane. This address was on part of the site where Louis Le Prince made his first moving picture. C.H. Verity's father was Leeds ironmonger and hardware shop manager Edwin Verity, who was born in Stanley, West Riding of Yorkshire. (Note: Edwin Verity (Stanley, West Riding of Yorkshire 1845 – 11 March 1909). GRO index: Deaths Mar 1909 Verity Edwin 54 Leeds 9b 421) Edwin and his elder brother Fred, known as Verity Brothers, were brought up by their uncle James Rogers, a shoemaker and farmer, because their mother died in the year when Fred was born and Edwin was two years old. (Note: Harriet Marland (1815–1847). GRO index: Marriages Sep 1838 Verity Charles, and Marland Harriet. Wakefield 22 463. Deaths Jun 1847 Verity Harriet Wakefield 22 507.) Edwin and Fred ran the hardware business together, and Edwin served on the Leeds Board of Guardians. C.H. Verity's mother was Ann "Annie" née Thornton. Edwin and Ann Verity married on 21 December 1871 in St Peter's Parish Church, Leeds. (Note: Ann "Annie" Thornton. Marriages GRO index: Dec 1871 Verity Edwin and Ann Thornton Leeds 9b 710. She was born in Kirkby Overblow.)

On 1 January 1895, the Verity Brothers partnership between Edwin Verity and Fred Verity was dissolved. Verity continued with the business as Fred Verity & Sons in Call Lane, while his brother Edwin started up a similar business at 42 Swinegate, Leeds, under his own name. Edwin moved or expanded his business to new premises at 189 Briggate, and continued in the business until his sudden death in 1909.

Verity, the youngest of four siblings, was born in Leeds in 1880, with the birth name "Claud". (Note: Claude Hamilton Verity (1880–1949). GRO index: Births Jun 1880 Verity Claud Hamilton Leeds 9b 627. Deaths Sep 1949 Verity Claud H. 69 Newton A. 7a 441. Note: He was named "Claud" on birth and death certificates, but "Claude" on his marriage certificate.) He lived in Roundhay as a child. In 1881 the family was living at 53 Sholebrook Avenue, Potternewton. By 1891 the family had moved to number 34 in the same street, his brother, Charles Frederick, (Note: Charles Frederick Verity (1876–1935). GRO index: Deaths Sep 1935 Verity Charles F. 60 Leeds South 9b 508) was apprenticed as an ironmonger, and Claude (now spelled with an "e") was a scholar at board school. Verity and his brother inherited their father's business in 1909.

On 7 September 1917 in Kensington, Verity married Riva Alice Mary Seller, who was sixteen years his junior. (Note: Riva Alice Mary Seller (born June 1896). GRO index: Births Sep 1896 Seller Riva Alice M Scarbro' 9d 391. Marriages Sep 1917 Seller Riva A. M., and Verity, Claude Hamilton Kensington 1a 362) They had three children: Diane "Diana" Faith Verity, (Note: Diane "Diana" Faith Verity (Scarborough 14 August 1918 – Caerleon 23 October 1962) GRO index: Births Sep 1918 Verity Diane F. Mother: Seller Scarbro 9d 568. Deaths Dec 1962 Verity Diana F. 44 Caerleon 8c 114.) Sheila Hope Verity, (Note: Sheila Hope Verity (born March 1920). GRO index: Births Jun 1920 Verity Sheila H. Mother: Seller Knaresbro' 9a 210) and Stuart Hamilton Verity. (Note: Stuart Hamilton Verity (born 1924). GRO index: Births Jun 1924 Verity Stuart H. Mother: Seller. Hatfield 3a 1261. Marriages Sep 1956 Verity Stuart H. and Clasper Riva Alice Mary. Solihull 9c 2533.) By April 1921, Verity and his family were living at 9 East Park Road, Harrogate. The 1939 Register finds Verity living at 19 Connaught Road, Harpenden, Hertfordshire, describing himself as a retired hardware merchant. At the end of his life, Verity was living in Torquay, Devon, and he played bowls at the Lynton and Lynmouth Bowling Club. Verity died in Devon on 15 August 1949. He left £1,482 7s 8d. (equivalent to £45,290.26 in 2025).

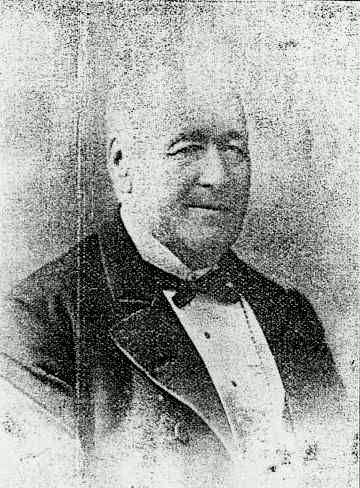
Charles Verity, Verity's grandfather

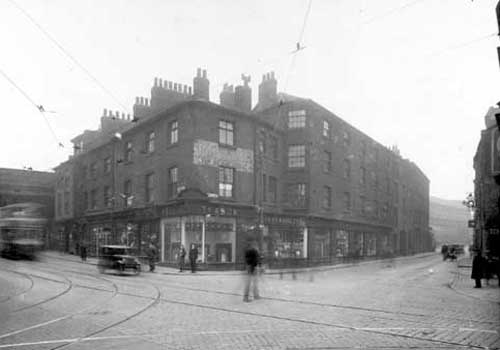
Fred Verity & Sons, Leeds

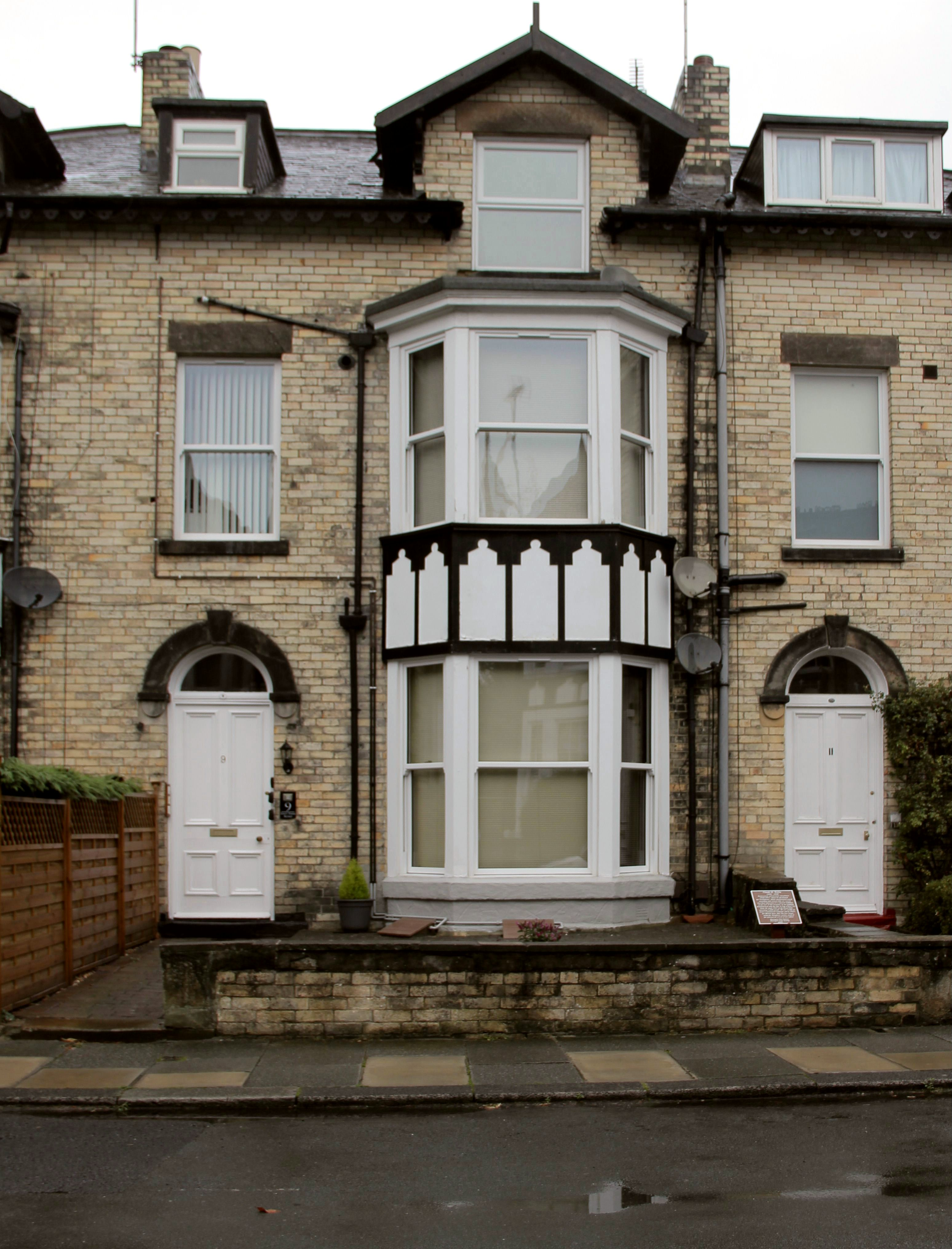
Verity lived in Harrogate in the 1920s.

== Career ==
During his early adult life, Verity's career was apparently unsettled. In 1901, the census shows a Leeds-born Claude Verity, aged 20, as a student of an agricultural college, living in a bedsit in Moot Villa, Moot Lane, Downton, Wiltshire. His father Edwin died suddenly of heart failure in 1909, and he and his brother inherited the family business, but by 1910 he was describing himself as an "engineering draughtsman" at Seacombe, Liverpool.. The 1911 census finds Verity as a boarder in Cliff Road, Falmouth, Cornwall, living on his own means. In 1912 he was in Scarborough, the birthplace of his future wife.

=== Synchronous sound in the cinema ===
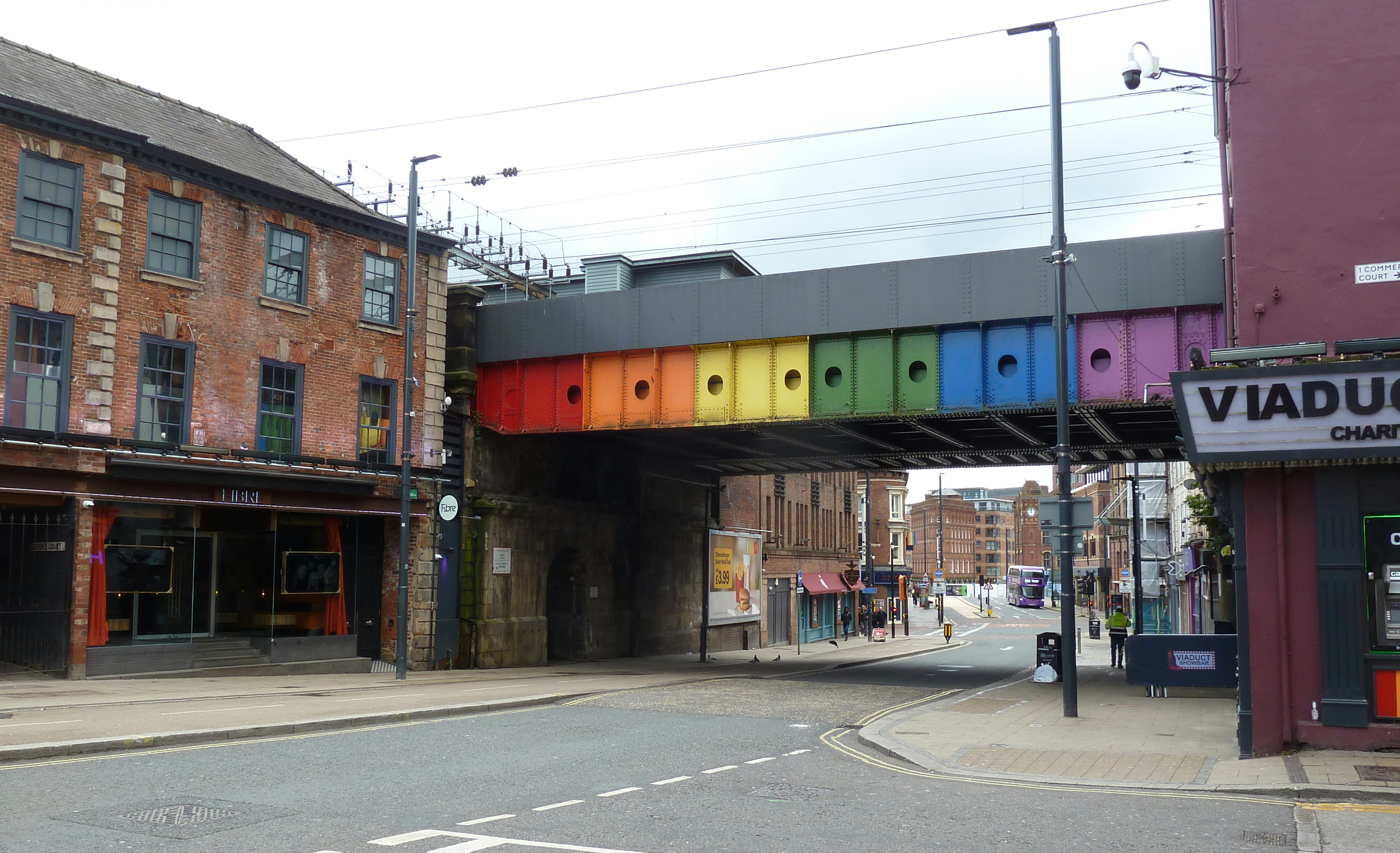
Site of Verity's Leeds premises (left) and site of le Prince's film of traffic (through bridge)

It so happened that Verity grew up in Roundhay where Louis le Prince, the inventor of an early motion-picture camera, had lived. It also happened that Verity's workshop in Briggate was close to Leeds Bridge where le Prince had shot his film of traffic in the late 1880s. However le Prince disappeared in 1890 when Verity was ten years old, so there was no direct engineering connection between them. Nevertheless, Verity was one of the first to work on the synchronisation of sound with film.

[Verity's earliest experimentation was built on] the earlier experiments of Dickson's 1893 Kinetoscope, Gaumont's Paris demonstration of 1900, and Oskar Messter's Kosmograph demonstrated in Berlin in 1903. Important though those efforts were, it was the general opinion that synchronisation was less than perfect, and it was this problem that Verity attempted to overcome in his laboratory [in Harrogate].

Verity worked on his invention and improvement of synchronous sound in the cinema in Harrogate and Leeds from at least 1915, while supporting himself as a hardware merchant at 168–169 Briggate, Leeds, although he temporarily converted part of the hardware shop to a workshop. The main laboratory for his inventions between 1915 and 1920 was at the back of his home in Harrogate where, according to historian Malcolm Neesam: "it was reached by an external folding staircase which guaranteed complete privacy". In obtaining the required sound recordings, Verity was assisted by Julian Clifford and his musicians.

Verity worked for five years in secrecy before patenting his work. It was in effect a type of dubbing operation, in which he used the gramophone record system to record voice-actors synchronising their words with the lip-movements of silent-film actors. Much of the patented material concerned the maintenance of the synchronisation between gramophone and film playback. Nigel McClea, of Harrogate Civic Society, said:

[On 28] April 1921, Claude [Verity] demonstrated in the Royal Hall in Harrogate two complete silent films where the actors actually talked! And this was more than six years before the premiere of The Jazz Singer; the film often regarded by cinema historians to be the world's first true talking picture.

In April 1922, the Yorkshire Evening News said that Verity was looking for financial backers, but "did not intend to work on the lines of a monopoly in regard to his invention". The newspaper described the effort and expense of Verity's inventive efforts, without the support of a large organisation:

For over three years [Verity] has been perfecting his idea [of synchronising sound with film], and so far it has entailed a cost of £7,000 (equivalent to £343,908.69 in 2025) but now to quote his own words: With my system of synchronisation I can guarantee to keep this relation of sound and lip movement under synchronous control to within one-twenty-fourth of a second for any length of time ... The solving of the problem of synchronisation was proved and admitted by the critics at Mr. Verity's first trade show in Harrogate [where the gramophone proved to be inaudible to the back of the crowd, so needed improvement].

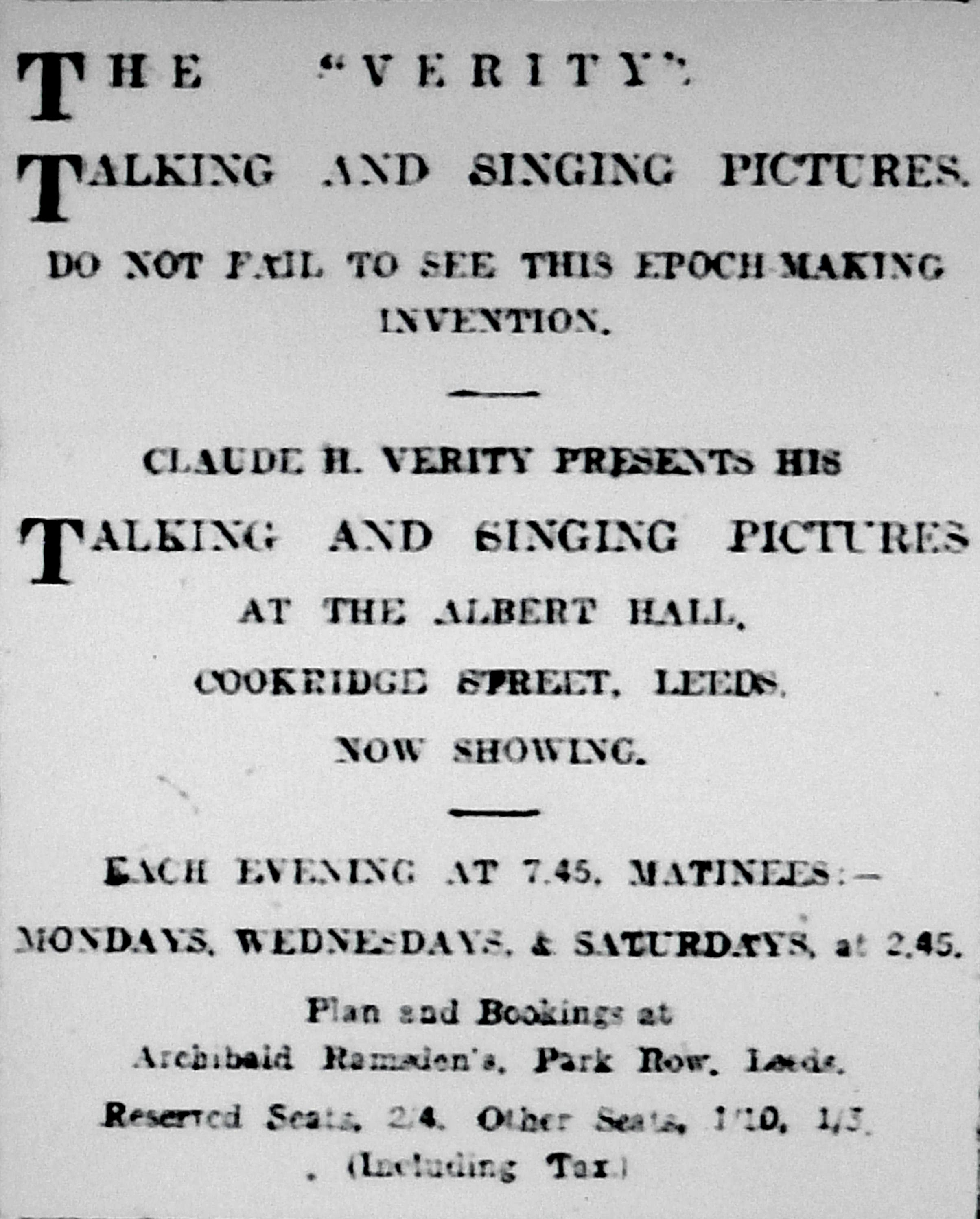
Ad for Verity's Leeds demonstration, 1922

In 1921 and 1922, Verity was showing his synchronisation of sound and movement in film, first in Harrogate as described above, then in Bradford, London and Leeds, where "[his] system worked well and was popular". In April 1922, The Yorkshire Evening Post published this description of his demonstration in Leeds:

Mr C.H. Verity, the inventor of an apparatus which has made the synchronisation of film and gramophone a practical proposition, is the head of a Leeds firm of hardware manufacturers and merchants. He is presenting his talking and singing pictures at the Albert Hall, Leeds, this week. Entertainments will be given each evening, and on three afternoons. The first programme consists of the first film productions under the Verity system of synchronisation. Mr Verity claims that the cost of these productions will be no greater than that of making silent films, because it is cheaper to help out scenes and actions by words than by the multiplication of dumb show. There are interesting possibilities in the production of talking pictures in these days when the demand is all for novelty and originality in entertainment. Four performances recently given in Harrogate attracted over 5,600 people. Although the film projection seemed at times to be a little faulty at this afternoon's entertainment, Mr Verity demonstrated that his system ensures co-timing of the gramophone and the motions of the film artists' lips and their gestures ... Films were purposely broken this afternoon to demonstrate to cinema exhibitors to show that when projection began again, synchronisation had not been interfered with in any way by the most common of camera mishaps.

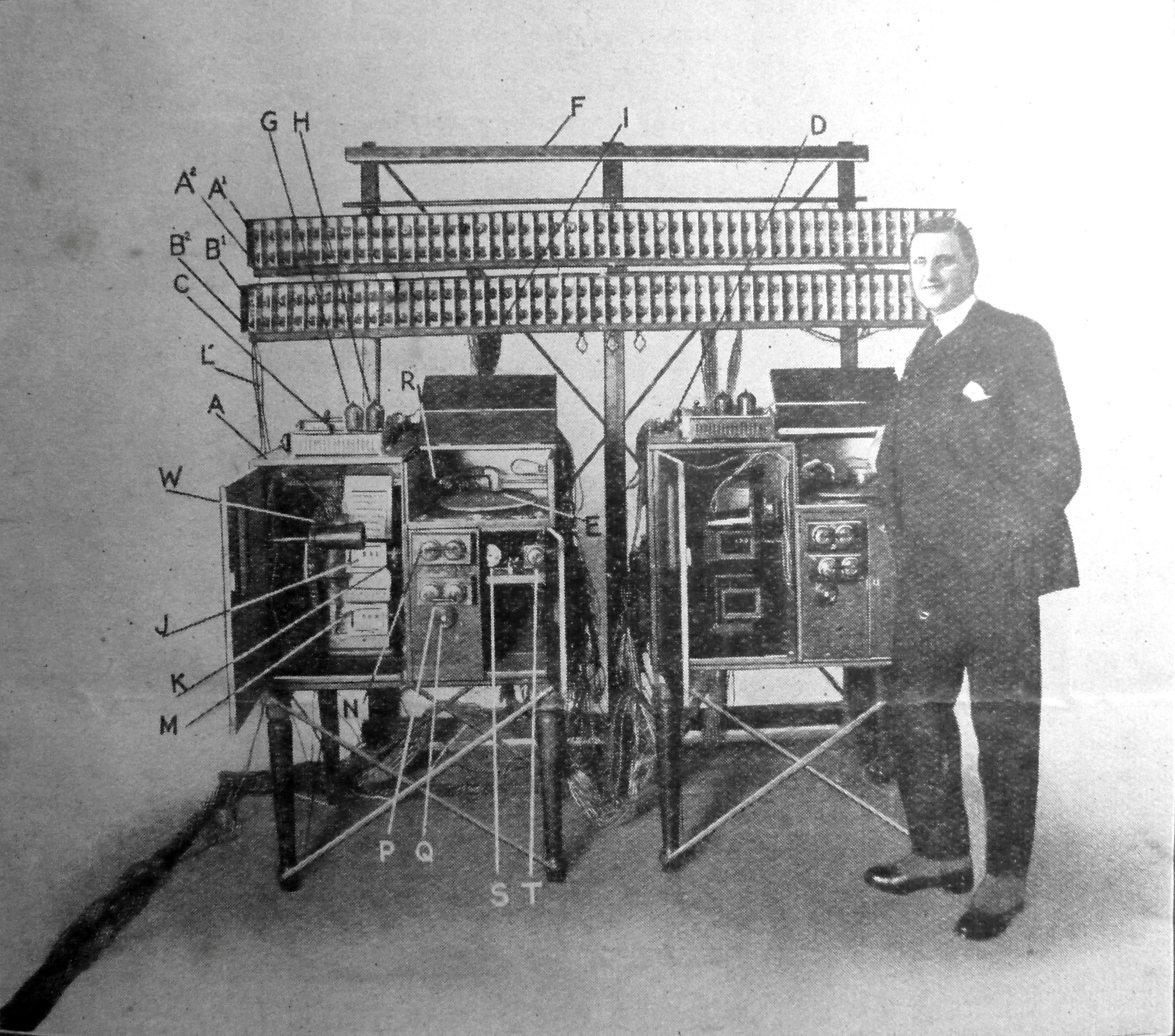
Verity with the Veritiphone, in 1922

By 1922, Verity was calling his invention the Veritiphone system, and by September of that year, he had improved its sound amplification. The Civil & Military Gazette of Lahore published a description of Verity's demonstration in the Waldorf Hotel, London, naming the apparatus as the Veritiphone. It said:

The new instrument is composed of an ordinary quite cheap sound-box, with a tone-arm, attached to the end of which an amplifying chamber is fitted. In this chamber is placed an electric element, and, by means of suitably-arranged holes in the sound-box and tone-arm, induced draught passes through, so that the apparatus is working under similar conditions to the human throat. Certainly, the result is excellent, and while one still cannot feel that the sounds are absolutely divorced from the mechanism producing them, the clearness in diction of the human voice was quite remarkable ... By means of amplifying instruments the volume of sound emitted can be graduated according to the size of the room.

In 1922, Jackson Wrigley wrote that the "invention of a synchroniser by Mr Claude H. Verity, a Harrogate engineer, enables the operator, by simply sliding a knob, quite independently of observing the screen, to work synchronisation to the 1–24th of a second". On 9 November 1923 Verity embarked for New York City on the RMS Aquitania, to be met on Ellis Island by J. Stuart Blackton, the vice president of the Vitagraph Company of America. In New York he showed his developments in "synchronisation of music and talking pictures". This led to Verity being mentioned in the New York press.

In June 1923, Kinematograph Weekly published a letter from Verity, who spelled his name "Claud" on this occasion. He defined the Veritiphone as the "Verity system of synchronised pictures". He said that he used two machines, the projector and the Veritiphone. This equipment could now be used in the projection room, instead of its previous position behind the projection screen, so that projection-room staff could "control synchronised production from the standard projectors at present fitted in any kinema where the synchroniser is installed".

In the New York Times on 20 January 1924, Verity had his say about the "technical difficulty of the sound film", "the prospects for the sound film" and Verity's improvements, and "the need for the sound film to reinvigorate the interest of audiences". He believed that the contemporary need to pad out silent film showings with music and additional acts, and the fact that small venues could not provide such additions, meant that silent film needed to provide more entertainment by itself. He wanted governments to support inventors and to invest in the future of sound and film. By this point, Verity's research and development of the Veritiphone had personally cost him over £7,000 (equivalent to £367,945.31 in 2025).

== Patents ==
Verity patented numerous inventions, including: "apparatus for the inhalation of medicated vapours", "low-temperature carbonisation". "clouderising coal dust", "electric radiators". "revolving doors", and "improvements to stoves". However, today it is his synchronisation of sound with moving pictures for which he is remembered.

The following patents were registered by Verity for the synchronising of sound, using "sound-on-disk systems":

- 18 March 1915. Patent no. 4239. "Synchronisation of Phonograph and Kinematograph".
- 28 August 1915. Patent no.12,394. "Synchronisation of Kinetograph and Photograph".
- 11 May 1916. Patent no. GB103407. "The synchronisation of machines for recording and reproducing sounds & movements".
- 23 May 1917. Patent no. 170,531, classification 352/23 (US patent)."Synchronization of Machines for Recording and Reproducing Sounds and Movements".
- 28 January 1920. Patent no. GB165489."Synchronisation of machines for recording and reproducing sounds and movements".
- 21 July 1922. Patent no. GB207222. "Improvements in or relating to gramophones and like sound reproducing machines".
- 5 June 1928. Patent no. GB318847. "Synchronisation of machines for recording sounds and movements and for reproducing such sounds and movements by phonograph and kinematograph".
- 19 June 1928. Patent no. GB318688. "Apparatus for reproducing synchronously recorded disk records and kinematograph films".
- The Yorkshire Evening News reported on 1 April 1922 that Verity's synchronisation system had also been patented in Germany.

The following patents were registered by Verity for the resynchronising of sound:

- 23 July 1928. Patent no. GB320881. "Means for the synchronisation of broadcast wireless sounds and kinematograph films".
- 13 August 1928. Patent no. GB321624. "Improvements relating to the synchronous reproduction of picture films and disk sound records".
- 24 September 1928. Patent no. GB322561. "Improvements relating to phonograph disc recording & reproducing machines and means for driving and synchronising same with kinematograph apparatus".
- 27 October 1928. Patent no. GB324411. "Improvements relating to electric pick-up supports for gramophones and means for indicating the position of the needle in the record groove and to facilitate synchronous reproduction with picture projection".

== Publications ==
- Verity, Claude H. (1928). Industrial Prosperity. (Note: It is not confirmed that the author of the book Industrial Prosperity is Claude Hamilton Verity)

== Institutions ==
Verity was initiated into Freemasonry at the Philanthropic Lodge, Leeds, in 1901.

== Brown plaque ==
On 13 August 2024 a planned recognition of Verity's achievement was announced. On 17 September 2025 at 9 East Park Road, Harrogate, the mayor of Harrogate Chris Aldred unveiled a brown plaque commemorating Verity's work. (Note: The plaque was supported by Harrogate Civic Society and Harrogate Film Society, and funded by property agents Verity Frearson, and the Verity family.) At the same time an exhibition, by creative artist Terry-Mike-Williams, dedicated to Verity's invention of the Veritiphone, was held in the Royal Hall, Harrogate, where Verity first demonstrated his invention. The exhibition was later held in the West Park Centre, Harrogate.

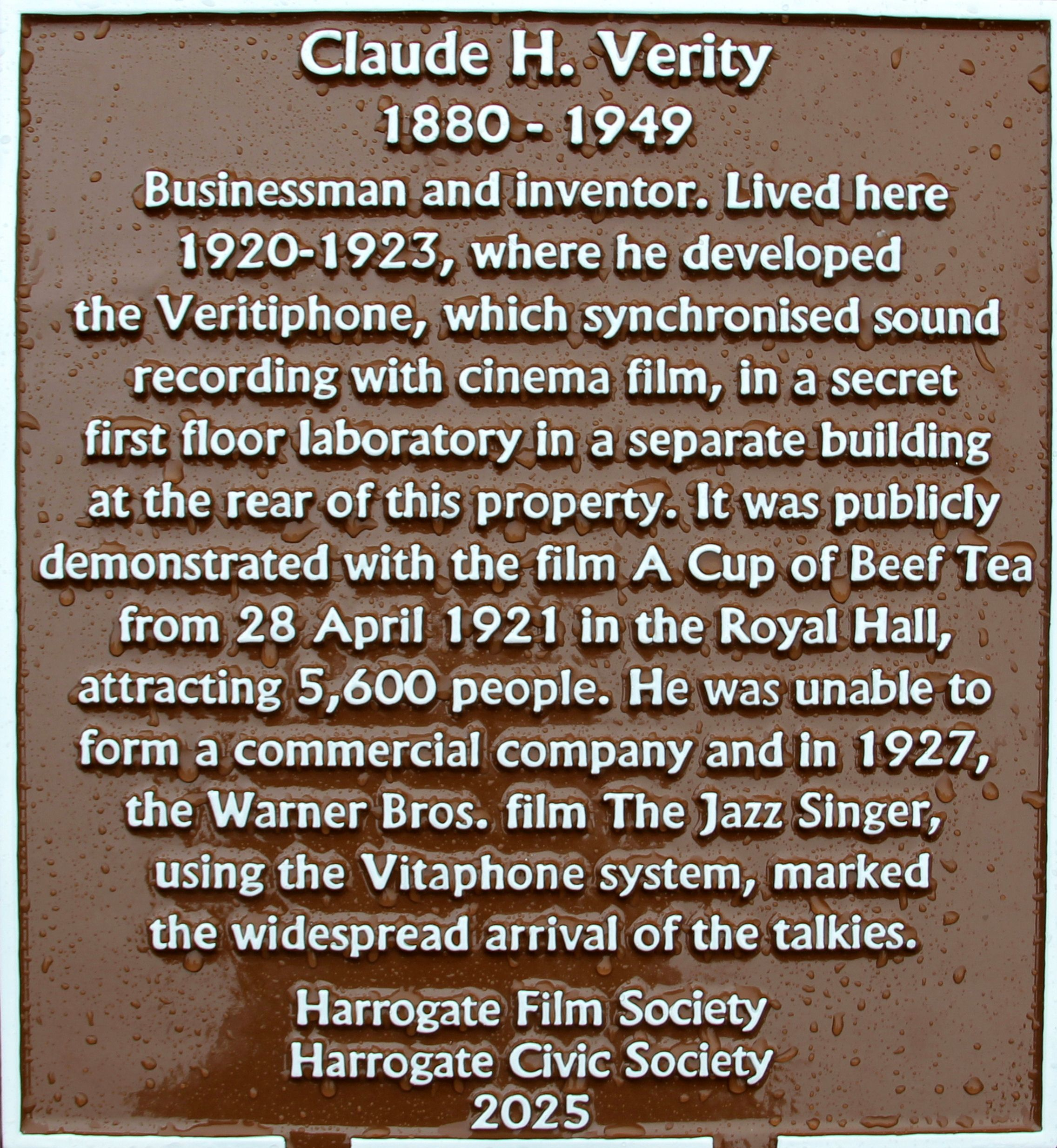
Verity's brown plaque at 9 East Park Road

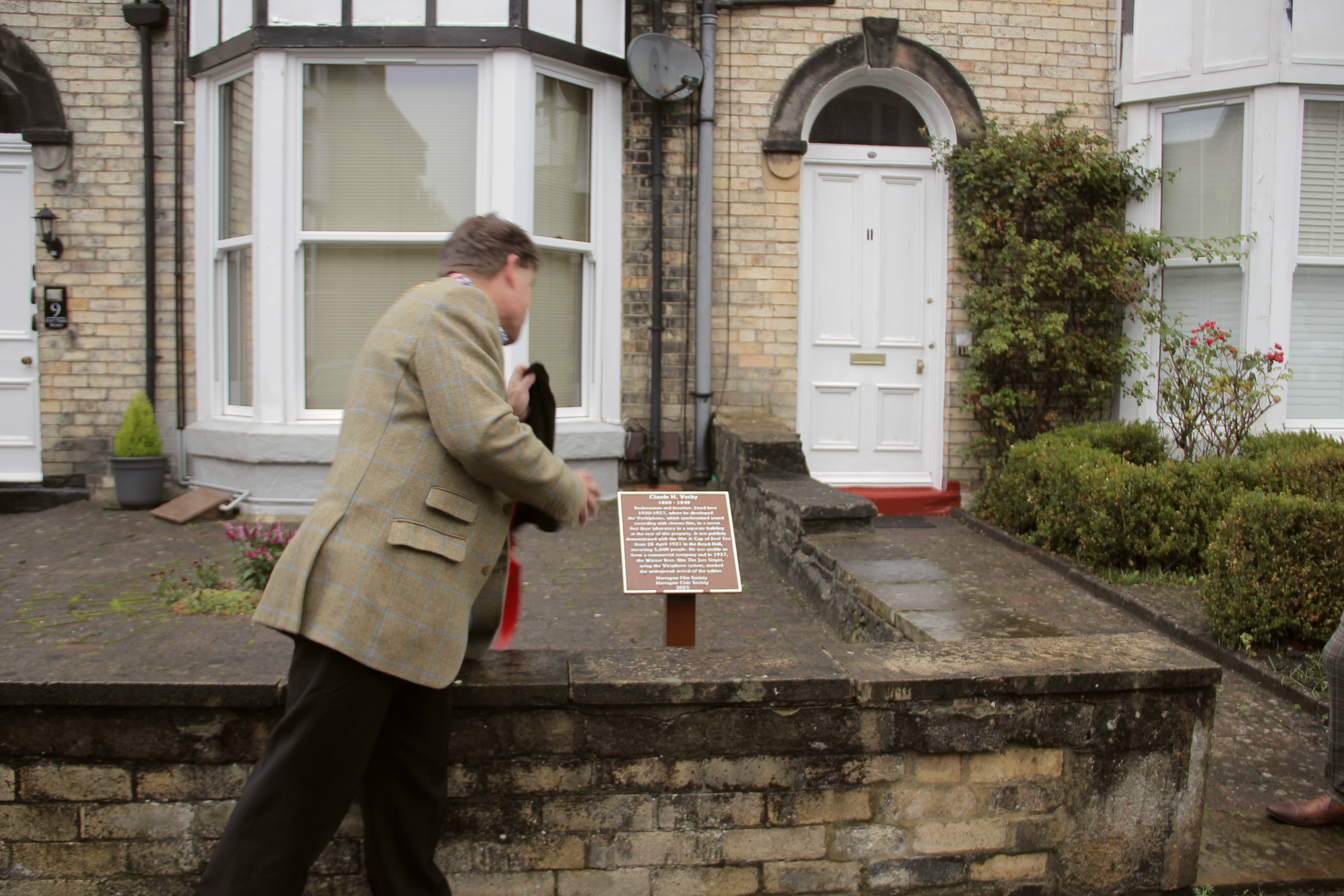
Mayor Chris Aldred unveils the plaque

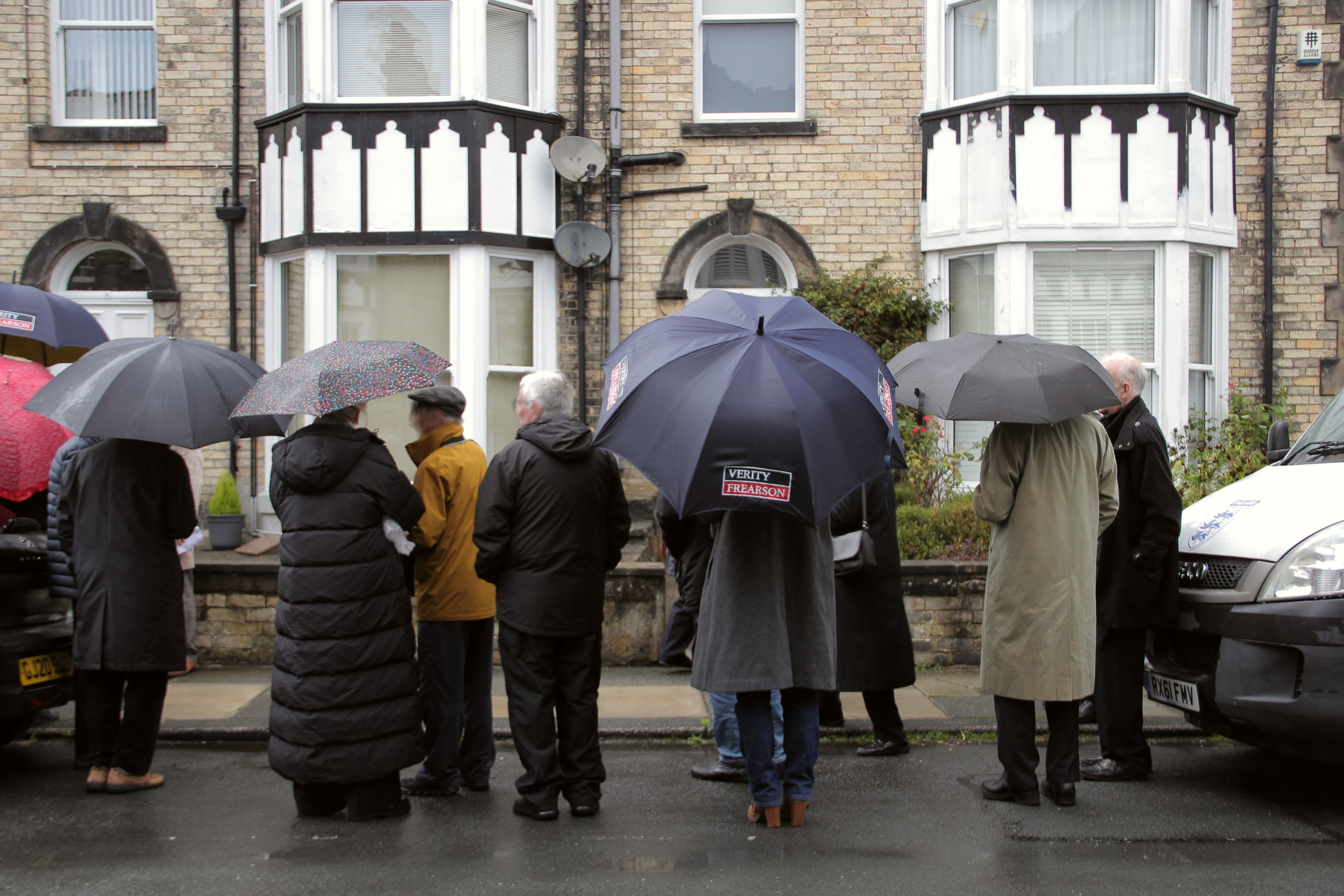
Onlookers braving the rain to watch the unveiling

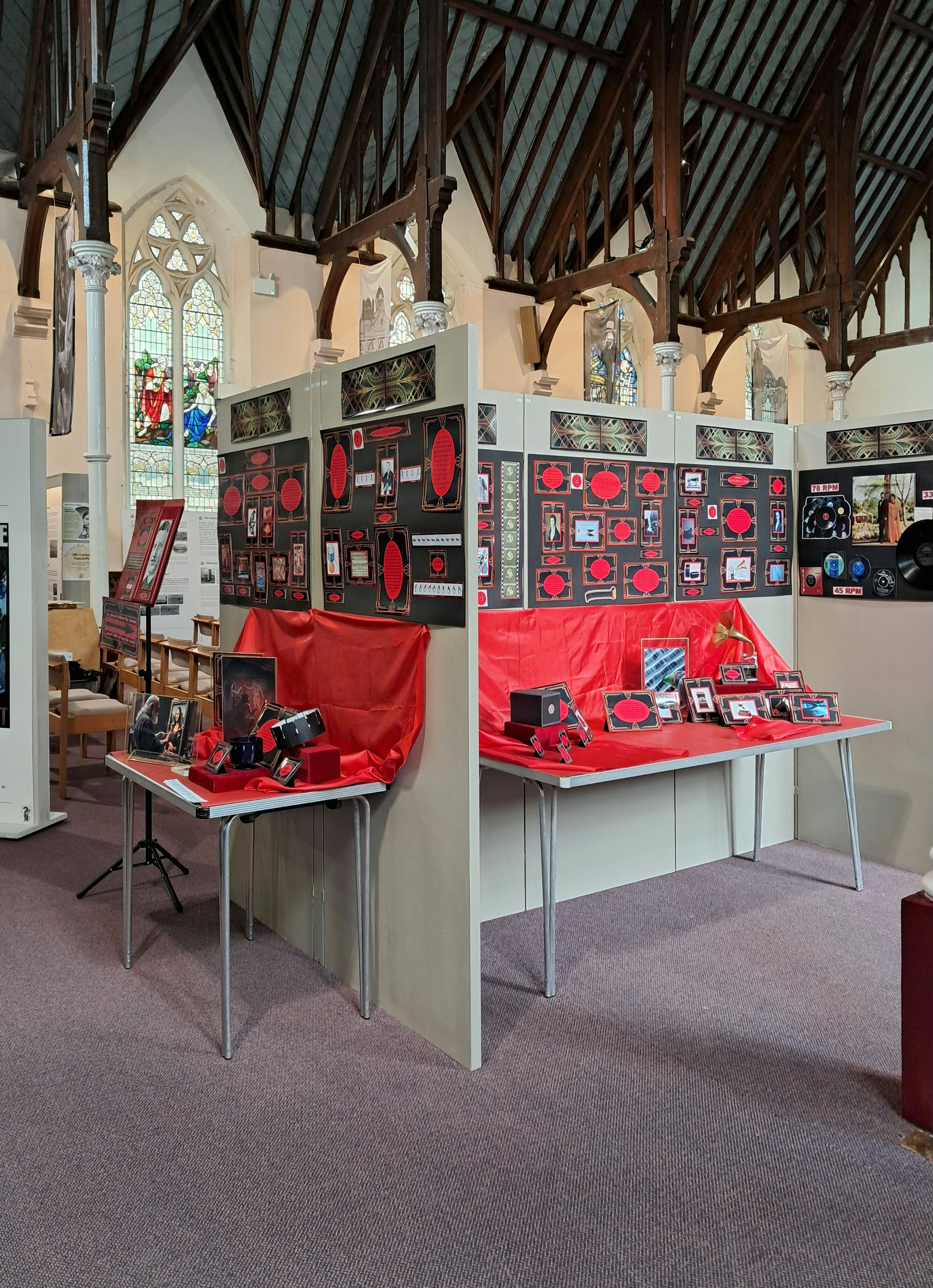
The Claude Verity exhibition at the West Park Centre
