= Wilton Park (disambiguation) =

Wilton Park may refer to:

== Places ==
=== In Australia ===
- Wilton Park, Wilton (New South Wales), a heritage-listed farm in Wilton, in south-western Sydney, New South Wales

=== In the United Kingdom ===
- Wilton Park Estate, an estate in Buckinghamshire
  - Wilton Park, Beaconsfield, a cricket ground within the estate
- Wilton Park, Batley, a public park in West Yorkshire
  - Bagshaw Museum, formerly called Wilton Park Museum, within the park
- Wilton Park, the grounds of Wilton House, Wiltshire

== Organisations ==
- Wilton Park, an executive agency of the UK Foreign and Commonwealth Office

== See also ==
- Wilton Parish
