= Upper Batley =

Area of Batley, West Yorkshire, England

Coordinates: 53.715°N 1.629°W

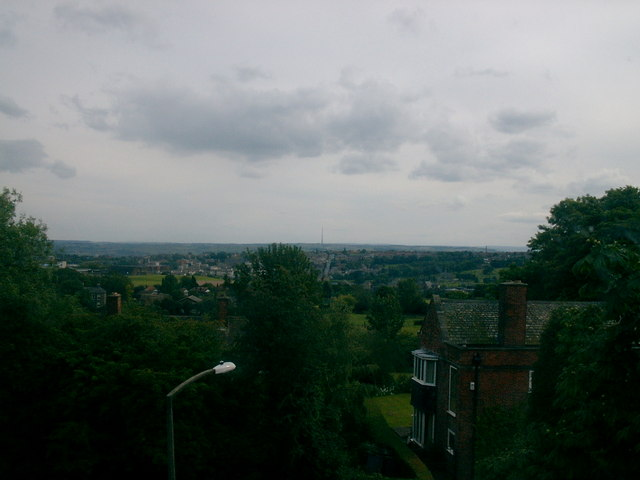
View of Upper Batley

Upper Batley is an area of Batley in West Yorkshire, England. It was popular with the millowners of Batley in the 19th century as a place to build their family homes. There are many fine stone built villas in the area. Batley Hall, a two-storey oak-and-stone building, was originally built in 1370 by William Copley, although the present building dates from 1857. Its gatehouses are now ordinary homes, and the Old Hall is now a residential home. The 17th-century banqueting hall in the grounds is a grade II* listed building, whose origins may have been a dovecote or a private chapel built as early as 1465 for Lady Elizabeth Copley when rheumatism prevented her from travelling to the parish church in Batley for services. Upper Batley is also a conservation area.

== See also ==
- Listed buildings in Batley
- Upper Batley High School
