= Michael Clegg (naturalist) =

British biologist (1933–1995)

- Michael Clegg in a 1987 episode of Clegg's People
- Born: Michael Clegg; 19 February 1933; Birdwell, West Riding of Yorkshire, England
- Died: 12 July 1995 (aged 62)
- Occupations: Museum curator; Naturalist; Radio broadcaster; Television presenter

Academic work
- Discipline: Natural Sciences
- Institutions: Sheffield University; Woodend Museum; Doncaster Museum and Art Gallery; Bagshaw Museum; Dundee Museum; Yorkshire Museum; University of Hull

Thomas Michael Clegg (19 February 1933 – 12 July 1995) was a British museum curator, naturalist, and television presenter.

== Early life ==
Clegg was born in Birdwell, in the then West Riding of Yorkshire and attended Ecclesfield School.

== Career ==
Prior to 1952, Clegg worked as a laboratory technician under Hans Adolf Krebs at Sheffield University's biochemistry department. From 1952 to 1955 he was a Junior Assistant in Natural History at the Sheffield City Museum, which he left between 1955 and 1959 to work at the Woodend Museum in Scarborough as the Assistant Curator before returning to the museum at Sheffield as Natural History Assistant in October 1959. From June 1963 until November 1966, Clegg was the Keeper of Natural Sciences at Doncaster Museum and Art Gallery before, in December 1966 moving to become the Curator of the Bagshaw Museum. He remained in this post until autumn of 1968 when he took up the position of Deputy Director of Dundee Museum, a post in which he remained for six years. In November 1974 he returned to Yorkshire as the Keeper of the Yorkshire Museum which was to be his final curatorship.

From 1982 Clegg was a freelance presenter. He presented 'Country Calendar', 'Strictly for the Birds' and 'Clegg's People' for Yorkshire Television, the latter of which ran for ten series as well as a number of programmes for the BBC. He also enjoyed an active radio career, contributing to various local and national natural history programmes and was the resident 'professional naturalist' on the BBC Radio 2 programme 'The Conch Quiz'. He wrote columns for the Dundee Courier and the Yorkshire Evening Post.

He was an extra mural lecturer for various universities, including Hull, where he was made an honorary fellow in the Department of Adult Education. He was involved with many natural history groups, his various positions includeming president of the Yorkshire Wildlife Trust and of the Yorkshire Naturalists' Union, along with vice presidencies of the Leeds Urban Wildlife Group, York Ornithologist's Club and Rossington Natural History Society.

Clegg was a fellow of the Museums Association and was awarded an honorary Doctor of Science degree by the University of Hull in 1993.

== Legacy ==
In 2004, a newly created hay meadow nature reserve at Broomhill Flash (near Wombwell, South Yorkshire) was named 'Clegg's Meadow' in recognition of Clegg's work campaigning for the protection of wildlife sites in the area.

An annual 'Michael Clegg Memorial Birdrace' is held on the first Sunday of each year in which teams from Yorkshire's popular bird-watching areas compete to find and identify as many species of birds in a single day, with proceeds of the event going to charity.

== Selected publications ==
- Clegg, M. 1961. "The food and feeding habits of a captive oystercatcher", British Birds 54, 204–205.
- Clegg, M. 1963. "Observations on an East Yorkshire population of the house mouse" (Mus musculus Linn.), The Naturalist 88, 39–40.
- Clegg, M. 1965. "Albinism of the tail-tip in the house mouse (Mus musculus Linn.)", Proceedings of the Zoological Society of London 147, 216–217.
- Clegg, M. 1970. "Introduced forms of the red squirrel in South Yorkshire and North Derbyshire", The Naturalist 95, 1–4.
- Clegg, M. 1973. "Working with community industry", Museums Journal 73. 103–104.
- Clegg, M. 1977. "Notes on the fishes of the Yorkshire River Derwent", The Naturalist 102, 105–109.
- Clegg, M. 1988. "Tree sparrows defoliatings rowan twigs", British Birds 18, 397.
- Clegg, M. 1991. "Birds", in Lewis, D. B. (ed), The Yorkshire Coast. Beverley, Normandy Press, 77–100.
