= Healey, Kirklees =

District of Batley in West Yorkshire, England

Coordinates: 53.71282°N 1.65300°W

Healey
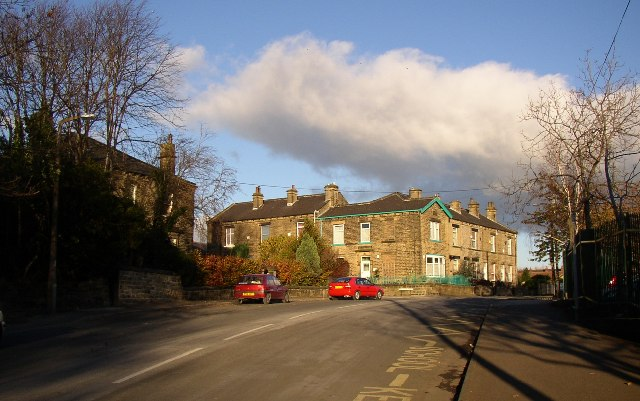
- Healey Lane

- Location within West Yorkshire
- OS grid reference: SE230241
- Metropolitan borough: Kirklees
- Metropolitan county: West Yorkshire
- Region: Yorkshire and the Humber
- Country: England
- Sovereign state: United Kingdom
- Post town: BATLEY
- Postcode district: WF17
- Dialling code: 01924
- Police: West Yorkshire
- Fire: West Yorkshire
- Ambulance: Yorkshire
- UK Parliament: Spen Valley, Dewsbury and Batley

Healey is an area of Batley, which is part of the Kirklees district, West Yorkshire, England.

Healey is located between Batley and Heckmondwike. The 2001 census counted a population of 3,011. Healey contains several council housing estates, one of which was referred to as "Tin Town" and is currently undergoing development with a mix of social housing.

Jessop's Park is a local green space in Healey.
