= WF postcode area =

Postcode area within the United Kingdom

Wakefield
- Postcode area
- Location within the United Kingdom
- Coordinates: 53.685°N 1.497°W
- Sovereign state: United Kingdom
- Postcode area: WF
- Postcode area name: Wakefield
- Post towns: 11
- Postcode districts: 18
- Postcode sectors: 75
- Postcodes (live): 14,415
- Postcodes (total): 18,237
- Statistics as at May 2020

The WF postcode area, also known as the Wakefield postcode area, is a group of 17 postcode districts in north-east England, which are subdivisions of eleven post towns. These cover much of southern and eastern West Yorkshire (including Wakefield, Pontefract, Dewsbury, Batley, Castleford, Heckmondwike, Knottingley, Liversedge, Mirfield, Normanton and Ossett), plus small parts of South and North Yorkshire.

Mail for the WF postcode area is processed at Leeds Mail Centre, along with mail for the BD, HD, HG, HX, LS and YO postcode areas.

== Coverage ==
The approximate coverage of the postcode districts:

Postcode district	Post town	Coverage	Local authority area(s)
WF1	WAKEFIELD	Agbrigg, Belle Vue, Eastmoor, Kirkthorpe, Newton Hill, Outwood, Wakefield City Centre	Wakefield
WF2	WAKEFIELD	Alverthorpe, Carr Gate, Flanshaw, Hall Green, Kirkhamgate, Kettlethorpe, Lupset, Newmillerdam, Portobello, Sandal, Thornes, Walton (Wakefield), Wrenthorpe, Woolgreaves, Peacock, Pledwick	Wakefield
WF3	WAKEFIELD	Bottom Boat, Carlton, East Ardsley, Lofthouse, Lofthouse Gate, Robin Hood, Stanley, Thorpe, Tingley, West Ardsley	Leeds, Wakefield
WF4	WAKEFIELD	Crigglestone, Crofton, Durkar, Flockton, Havercroft, Horbury, Sharlston, Middlestown. Netherton, New Crofton, Notton, Ryhill, West Bretton, Wintersett, Woolley	Wakefield, Kirklees
WF5	OSSETT	Gawthorpe, Healey, Ossett (very small area around Wakefield Road falls in the Kirklees district)	Wakefield, Kirklees
WF6	NORMANTON	Altofts, Normanton	Wakefield
WF7	PONTEFRACT	Ackworth Moor Top, Ackton, Featherstone, Purston Jaglin, Streethouse	Wakefield
WF8	PONTEFRACT	Darrington, Kirk Smeaton, Little Smeaton, Pontefract (Monkhill), Thorpe Audlin	Wakefield, North Yorkshire, Doncaster
WF9	PONTEFRACT	Badsworth, Fitzwilliam, Hemsworth, Kinsley, South Elmsall, South Kirkby, Upton, Wentbridge	Wakefield, Doncaster
WF10	CASTLEFORD	Airedale, Allerton Bywater, Castleford, Glasshoughton, Ledston, New Fryston	Wakefield, Leeds
WF11	KNOTTINGLEY	Brotherton, Byram, Cridling Stubbs, Fairburn, Kellingley, Knottingley	Wakefield, North Yorkshire
WF12	DEWSBURY	Briestfield, Chickenley, Dewsbury, Savile Town, Shaw Cross, Thornhill, Thornhill Lees, Whitley Lower	Kirklees, Leeds
WF13	DEWSBURY	Dewsbury Moor, Ravensthorpe, Staincliffe	Kirklees
WF14	MIRFIELD	Battyeford, Hopton, Mirfield	Kirklees
WF15	LIVERSEDGE	Hartshead, Hightown, Roberttown, Liversedge	Kirklees
WF16	HECKMONDWIKE	Heckmondwike	Kirklees
WF17	BATLEY	Birstall, Batley, Hanging Heaton, Soothill, Staincliffe	Kirklees
WF90	WAKEFIELD	La Redoute (formerly Redcats Empire Building)	Non-geographic

== Map ==
WF postcode area map, showing postcode districts in red and post towns in grey text, with links to nearby BD, DN, HD, LS, S and YO postcode areas.

== See also ==
- Postcode Address File
- List of postcode areas in the United Kingdom
