= Batley Girls' High School =

Secondary school and sixth form in Batley, West Yorkshire, England

Coordinates: 53°43′56.7″N 1°38′42.4″W

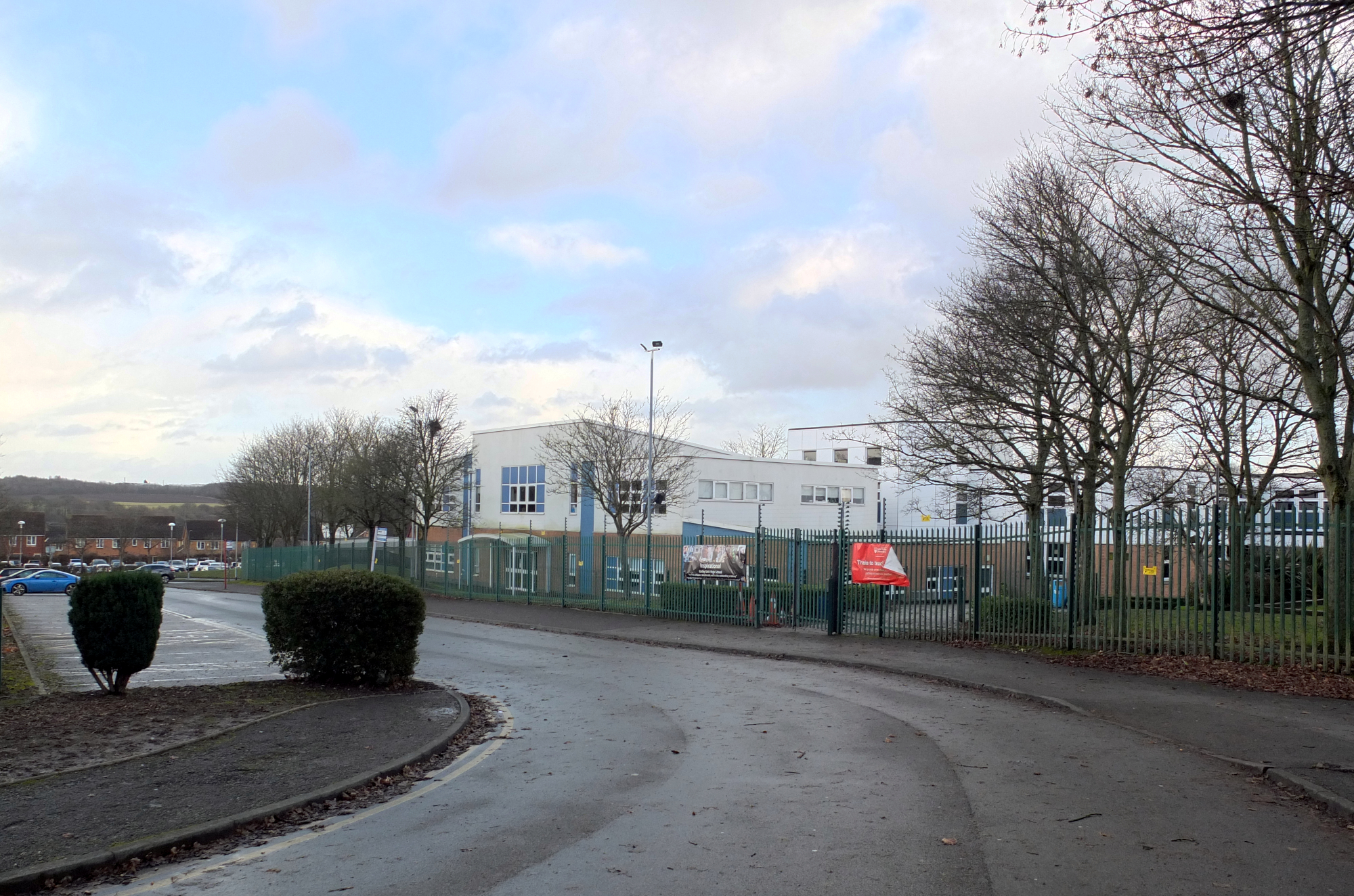
- View of the school (2019)

Location
- Windmill Lane; Batley; West Yorkshire, WF17 0LD; England

Information
- Type: Academy
- Local authority: Kirklees
- Department for Education URN: 137424 Tables
- Ofsted: Reports
- Headteacher: David Cooper
- Head teacher: Gary Kibble
- Gender: Girls
- Age: 11 to 19
- Enrolment: 1,227 pupils as of October 2015
- Website: http://www.batleygirls.co.uk/

Batley Girls' High School is a secondary school and sixth form in Batley, West Yorkshire, England.

It was previously a community school administered by Kirklees Metropolitan Borough Council, and gained specialist status as a Visual Arts College in 2004. The school converted to academy status in 2011, but continues to coordinate with Kirklees Metropolitan Borough Council for admissions.

Batley Girls' High School offers GCSEs and BTECs as programmes of study for pupils, while students in the sixth form have the option study from a range of A-levels and further BTECs.
