= Listed buildings in Batley =

Batley is a town and an unparished area in the metropolitan borough of Kirklees, West Yorkshire, England. It contains 63 listed buildings that are recorded in the National Heritage List for England. Of these, one is listed at Grade I, the highest of the three grades, two are at Grade II*, the middle grade, and the others are at Grade II, the lowest grade. Included in the list are the districts of Brown Hill, Carlinghow, Staincliffe and Upper Batley. (Note: The list contains, broadly, the listed buildings in the wards of Batley East and Batley West, with some buildings in those wards nearer the centre of Dewsbury being included in Listed buildings in Dewsbury.) During the 19th century, Batley became "Queen of the West Riding shoddy towns", shoddy being the process of breaking down rags and waste fabric to be re-used in the manufacture of uniforms. The listed buildings remaining from this industry include a group of three-storey warehouses and showrooms in Station Road. The other listed buildings include houses, cottages and associated structures, churches and items in churchyards, a milestone and boundary stones, a former watermill, a railway viaduct and subways, schools, civic buildings, banks, structures in the cemetery, a museum, a war memorial, and a pair of telephone kiosks.

== Key ==
| Grade | Criteria |
|---|---|
| I | Buildings of exceptional interest, sometimes considered to be internationally important |
| II* | Particularly important buildings of more than special interest |
| II | Buildings of national importance and special interest |

== Buildings ==
| Name and location | Photograph | Date | Notes | Grade |
|---|---|---|---|---|
| Effigy, All Saints Church; 53.71589°N 1.63582°W | — | 13th century (probable) | The effigy is to the east of the church porch, and is in stone on a stone base. The effigy is recumbent, and depicts a robed figure with hands together on the chest. | II |
| All Saints' Church; 53.71600°N 1.63588°W | | c. 1485 | The church incorporates material from a 13th-century church. It was restored in 1872–73, and is in Perpendicular style. It is built in stone with a stone slate roof, and consists of a nave with a clerestory, north and south aisles, a south porch, a chancel, a north vestry, and a west tower. The tower has a parapet that is corbelled out, machicolated, and embattled, and there are tall square pinnacles. | I |
| Banqueting House; 53.72484°N 1.63287°W | — | 17th century | A building of uncertain purpose in brick with raised decorative diamond patterning in sunk panels, and a stone slate roof. There are two storeys and one bay, and a lean-to stair turret at the rear. The building has two string courses, corbelled eaves, and corner pilasters. The main windows are chamfered mullioned and transomed, and there are cross windows flanking the doorways. In the east and south fronts are arched doorways flanked by pilasters with moulded volutes. | II* |
| Manor Cottage; 53.70943°N 1.65283°W | — | 1703 | Two cottages, later combined, the house is in stone with quoins, a slate roof, and two storeys. The doorway is near the centre, and to the left is a blocked doorway with a deep dated lintel. There is one single-light window, and the other windows are mullioned with three lights. | II |
| 89 and 91 Brookroyd Lane, Brown Hill; 53.72962°N 1.65757°W | — | 1708 | A stone house, partly rendered, with quoins and a stone slate roof. There are two storeys, a symmetrical front of two bays, and a gabled rear wing and an outshut. The central doorway has a chamfered surround and an initialled and dated arched head. The window to the right of the doorway has been altered, and the other windows are mullioned, with some mullions removed. | II |
| Staincliffe Hall; 53.70931°N 1.65157°W | — | 1709 | A large house in stone, with quoins, and a stone slate roof with coped gables and finials on square kneelers. There are two storeys and attics, a main front of three gabled bays, and six bays on the left return. The gable of the left bay has been heightened to form a parapet, the middle bay contains a doorway with an inscribed segmental arch, and in the right bay is a canted bay window. The ground floor of the left bay contains a 14-light mullioned and transomed window, and the other windows are mullioned. In the left return is a porch with a moulded arched doorway. | II |
| 2 and 4 South Bank Road, Carlinghow; 53.71910°N 1.64887°W | — | Early 18th century | A stone house with quoins, and a stone slate roof with chamfered gable copings on moulded kneelers. There are two storeys, and an L-shaped plan, consisting of a main range with three bays, and a rear wing with an outshut. The main doorway has a Tudor arched lintel, and the windows are mullioned, with some mullions removed. There is a continuous hood mould over the ground floor windows. | II |
| Healds House; 53.70024°N 1.65240°W | — | 18th century | The house, which incorporates 16th-century material, was altered in the 19th century, and has been at one time a meeting house and a school. It is in brick on a chamfered stone plinth, with stone dressings, including quoins, a band, sills, and gutters. There are two storeys, four bays, a lean-to extension on the left, and a rear outshut. The doorway has pilasters, and above it is an inscribed three-panel tablet. There are canted bay windows to the left of the doorway, and on the left return. | II |
| Milepost; 53.70843°N 1.65901°W | | Mid to late 18th century | The milepost stands on Halifax Road outside No. 125. It consists of a square stone set at an angle and inscribed on two faces with letters and numbers. | II |
| 110 Oaks Road, Batley; 53.71123°N 1.61585°W | — | Late 18th century | A stone house with quoins, a stone slate roof, and two storeys. In the garden front is a central doorway, the windows are mulliond sashes, and at the rear is a catslide roof. | II |
| 83 and 85 Bunkers Lane, Staincliffe; 53.70936°N 1.65216°W | — | Late 18th century | A pair of stone cottages with quoins, and a stone slate roof with gable copings on cut kneelers. There are two storeys, three bays, and a single-story extension to the left. Near the centre are two doorways, the windows are mullioned, and in the extension are garage doors. | II |
| 6 and 8 Intake Road, Brown Hill; 53.72842°N 1.65529°W | — | Late 18th century | Three cottages, later combined, the building is in stone, with quoins and a stone slate roof. There are two storeys, and the windows are mullioned. | II |
| Carlinghow Mill; 53.72296°N 1.64524°W | — | Late 18th century | Originally a watermill, it has been altered and extended. The buildings are in sandstone with roofs of stone slate and corrugated iron, and consist of the mill building, a barn, and an attached range. The mill building has three storeys at the front, and a gabled entrance with a central doorway, loading doors above, mullioned windows, and a Venetian window in the gable pediment. At the rear is a two-storey extension and a truncated chimney. The barn has quoins and wagon entries with four-centred arches and voussoirs, and it contains square windows and ventilation slits. The attached range has a single storey and altered openings. | II |
| 1 and 2 Staincliffe Mill Yard; 53.70610°N 1.65299°W | — | Early to mid 19th century | A pair of stone houses with quoins, moulded gutter brackets, and a slate roof. There are two storeys, and each house has one bay. The doorways are to the left, and both houses have a three-light mullioned window in each floor. | II |
| Holy Trinity Church; 53.70137°N 1.63591°W | | 1840–41 | The church was designed by R. D. Chantrell in Gothic Revival style, and the porch and north aisle were added in 1894–94 by W. Swinden Barber. The church is built in stone with a slate roof, and consists of a nave, a north aisle, a south porch, a chancel, and a west tower. The tower has diagonal buttresses, a clock face, and a plain parapet with crocketed pinnacles. | II |
| Railway subway, Lady Ann Road; 53.71407°N 1.62384°W | — | Mid-1840s | The subway was built by the Leeds, Dewsbury and Manchester Railway over a footpath, and was later altered. It is sloping, and built in sandstone. Both faces have semicircular arches, the east face has stepped, rusticated voussoirs, an impost band and a triangular parapet. The west face is higher and has stepped voussoirs. | II |
| Railway subway, West Street; 53.71297°N 1.62362°W | | Mid-1840s | The subway was built by the Leeds, Dewsbury and Manchester Railway over a footpath, and was later extended. It is built in sandstone and purple engineering brick. The east face has a segmental arch of stepped sandstone voussoirs, an impost band, and rectangular piers. The later west face is taller and has a semicircular arch of engineering brick with an impost band and a parapet. | II |
| 521 Bradford Road; 53.71953°N 1.64198°W | | 1848 | Originally a National School, later used for other purposes, it is in stone, and has a stone slate roof with coped gables, long carved kneelers, and square pyramidal finials. There is a single storey and a basement and three bays. In the central bay, steps lead up to a gabled porch with a low Tudor arch, carved spandrels, and a hood mould, and in the gable is an inscribed and dated plaque. The outer bays contain tall four-light chamfered mullioned windows with round arched lights and hood moulds. Flanking the porch, steps lead down to basement entrances. | II |
| Railway viaduct 53.70739°N 1.62341°W | | 1848 | The railway viaduct carries the Leeds to Manchester line. It is built in stone, and consists of 16 arches on slender piers. The viaduct has a moulded impost band, and the parapet has a moulded base. | II |
| Town Hall; 53.71403°N 1.63318°W | | 1853–54 | The town hall, which was rebuilt and extended in 1905 following a fire, is in Italianate style. It is built in stone with rusticated quoins, a guilloché frieze, a bracketed cornice, and a hipped slate roof. There are two storeys, a front of seven bays, the middle three bays projecting under a pediment, and on the left return is the original entrance with six bays, the left three projecting. The middle bays on the front have pilasters, vermiculated at the base and with garlanded capitals. The central round-arched doorway has engaged columns, a keystone, carved spandrels, a cornice, and a balcony, and the windows above has a pediment. The outer bays in the ground floor contain round-arched windows with architraves, and the other windows on the front are square-headed, those in the upper floor with dentilled cornices. | II |
| Wesleyan Methodist Church; 53.71225°N 1.62851°W | | 1861 | The former chapel is in stone, with rusticated quoins, a sill band, and a slate roof. There are two storeys, a four-bay front with a pedimented gable, and six bays along the sides. In the centre is a double doorway with pilasters and a common entablature. The windows are sashes, those in the ground floor with segmental heads and keystones, and those in the upper floor with round-arched heads, pilasters, and rusticated voussoirs. In the tympanum of the pediment is an oculus with a scrolled surround, the word "WESLEYAN" below, and a vase acroterion on the apex of the gable. | II |
| 25 Station Road and warehouses 53.71110°N 1.62562°W | — | 1864 | A group of warehouses in stone on a corner site, with rusticated quoins, sill bands, a panelled frieze, a dentilled cornice, a moulded eaves cornice on console brackets, and a hipped slate roof. There are three storeys, a symmetrical front of three bays, a curved corner, seven bays along the left return, and beyond that a four-storey block with three bays on the front and ten bays deep. On the front, steps lead up to a central doorway that has a segmental-headed fanlight, and a keystone carved with a shield and a ram with the date. The flanking windows have segmental heads, architraves and keystones, in the middle floor are paired round-arched windows, and the top floor contains windows with plain surrounds. | II |
| Cemetery Chapels; 53.71538°N 1.64341°W | | 1865 | The chapels consist of a central steeple over an arch, flanked by identical chapels; they are all in stone with slate roofs. Over the pointed archway is a three stage tower with angle buttresses rising to pinnacles. The top stage of the tower is octagonal, and contains arched openings with colonnettes, and a pieced parapet with diamond-shaped pinnacles, and it is surmounted by an octagonal spire. Each chapel has four bays, a gabled porch, two-light windows on the sides, and a five-light east window. | II |
| Cemetery Lodge; 53.71553°N 1.64191°W | | 1866 | The cemetery lodge is in stone with quoins, and a slate roof with coped gables, gablets, and decorative iron finials. There are two storeys and an asymmetrical plan, consisting of a near-central tower, a gabled cross-wing on the left, and a single-storey rear wing. The tower has a porch with a pointed arch, above which are two thin lancet windows, a blind pointed window, and a sprocketed spire surmounted by decorative ironwork. To the left is a canted bay window, and on the right return facing the road is a square bay window. | II |
| Cemetery wall, railings, gates and gate piers 53.71542°N 1.64183°W | | c. 1866 | At the entrance to the cemetery are two pairs of gate piers, one pair smaller. They are in stone with quoins, the larger piers with gablets and foliated finials. The boundary walls contain raised piers and are coped, and the railings and gates are decorative and in iron. | II |
| Christ Church; 53.70849°N 1.65209°W | | 1866–67 | The church, designed by W. H. Crossland in Gothic Revival style, is in stone with a slate roof. It consists of a nave with a clerestory, north and south aisles, north and south porches, a chancel. and a west tower. The tower has three stages, diagonal buttresses, and an embattled parapet with crocketed pinnacles. The west window has four lights, and the east window has five. | II |
| St Thomas' Church; 53.71724°N 1.62668°W | | 1867–68 | The church is in Early English style, and is built in stone with a slate roof. It consists of a nave with a clerestory, north and south aisles, a chancel with a north vestry, and a southwest steeple. The steeple has a tower with three stages, angle buttresses, a south arched doorway, an oculus on each face, louvred bell openings with colonnettes and foliated capitals, a perforated parapet with octagonal pinnacles and gargoyles, and a recessed spire. | II |
| Boundary stone No. 4; 53.71968°N 1.63209°W | | 1869 | The boundary stone is at the junction of Blenheim Drive And Batley Field Road, and consists of a rectangular stone block. It is inscribed with initials and the date. | II |
| Boundary stone No. 5; 53.72473°N 1.63118°W | — | 1869 | The boundary stone is in Old Hall Road opposite Batley Hall, and consists of a rectangular stone block. It is inscribed with initials and the date. | II |
| Zion Methodist Chapel; 53.71474°N 1.63340°W | | 1869 | The chapel is in stone with giant Corinthian pilasters, a moulded eaves cornice, and a hipped slate roof. There are two storeys and a basement, a symmetrical front of five bays, the middle three bays projecting under a pediment, and seven bays along the sides. Steps flanked by pierced balustrades and piers lead up to three round-arched doorways flanked by pilasters with moulded capitals, carved spandrels, and keystones on consoles. The windows are round-arched; in the front the upper floor the middle three windows have pediments, the outer windows have cornices, all on festooned consoles, and all have blind balustrades. Along the sides, the windows in the lower floor have rusticated voussoirs, and in the upper floor they have an impost band. | II |
| St Mary's Church; 53.71715°N 1.64206°W | — | 1869–70 | Transepts were added to the church in 1884, which is built in stone with a slate roof, and is in Gothic Revival style. The church consists of a nave with a porch and an apsidal baptistery, small transepts, and a chancel with an apse and chapels. There is a central doorway with a pointed arch and a cambered head. | II |
| 2, 4, 6 and 8 Station Road; 53.71124°N 1.62665°W | | c. 1870 | A row of four warehouses in Classical style, in stone with rusticated quoins, bands and cornices between the floors, an eaves cornice on consoles, and a slate roof. There are three storeys and a symmetrical front of eight bays, the middle two bays projecting forward. In these bays are round-arched doorways flanked by pilasters with foliated capitals and with fanlights, spandrels carved with serpents and dragons, and keystones carved with heads, and the windows above are similar. In the outer bays are two doorways with simpler surrounds, and the windows are sashes, in the lower two storeys with round heads and keystones, those in the ground floor also with aprons, and the windows in the top floor have segmental heads. | II |
| 13, 15, 17, 19, 21 and 23 Station Road, wall, piers, steps and railings 53.71125°N 1.62612°W | | c. 1870 | The warehouses, later used for other purposes, are in Italian Gothic style, and are in stone with a slate roof on a corner site. There are three storeys and a basement, fronts of eight and three bays, and two bays across the corner. On the corner is a pyramidal roof surmounted by decorative ironwork. The doorways and windows have round-arched heads and hood moulds. At the top of the building is a moulded eaves cornice, on the shorter fronts are perforated parapets, and there are turrets with conical roofs on the corners. In front of the building are a boundary wall, piers, steps and railings. | II |
| 16 and 18 Station Road; 53.71054°N 1.62556°W | — | c. 1870 | A stone warehouse with rusticated quoins, a moulded cornice over the ground floor, a band, a moulded eaves cornice and blocking course, and a slate roof. There are three storeys, a front of six bays, and the windows are sashes. In the ground floor are round-headed arches with moulded surrounds, and pilaster-like piers with moulded capitals, containing two doors and four windows, the windows in the middle floor have segmental heads, and those in the top floor have square heads. | II |
| 20 and 22 Station Road; 53.71037°N 1.62538°W | — | c. 1870 | A pair of stone warehouses with rusticated quoins, a cornice above the ground floor, a sill band in the top floor, a moulded eaves cornice on consoles, a blocking course, and a slate roof. There are three storeys and a symmetrical front of eight bays, the middle two bays projecting forward and containing a round-arched carriage entry. The outer bays contain central doorways with round-arched heads, pilasters, vermiculated spandrels, and keystones. The windows in the lower two floors have round heads, keystones, and aprons, in the middle floor also with cornices, and the windows in the top floor have square heads. | II |
| 24 and 26 Station Road; 53.71022°N 1.62523°W | — | c. 1870 | A warehouse in Italian Gothic style, it is in stone with string courses, a moulded eaves cornice on carved brackets, and a slate roof. There are three storeys and six bays. In the ground floor are two doorways and four windows, all square-headed, the bays separated by square columns with foliated capitals. The doors have fanlights, and under the windows are aprons. The middle floor contains round-arched windows with Gothic hood moulds containing alternately coloured voussoirs, and in the top floor are paired square-headed windows. | II |
| 31 and 33 Station Road and adjoining warehouse 53.71076°N 1.62530°W | — | c. 1870 | The warehouses are in stone with quoins, moulded sill bands, a moulded cornice over the ground floor, a moulded eaves cornice on square brackets, and a hipped slate roof. There are three storeys and a basement, the basement vermiculated, a front of four bays, two similar bays on the sides, and plainer eight bays behind these. Steps lead up to the round-arched doorway that has pilasters, carved spandrels, and a cornice on console brackets. The ground floor windows have round arches, two lights and a central colonnette with a foliated capital, the windows in the middle floor are round-headed with a segmental pediment, and the top floor windows are square-headed. | II |
| 32, 34 and 40 Station Road; 53.70975°N 1.62431°W | — | c. 1870 | A row of warehouses, the central ones demolished, in Italian Gothic style. They are in stone with an eaves cornice on consoles, and hipped slate roofs. There are three storeys, No. 32 has three bays, only the doorway of No. 34 remains, and No. 40 has ten bays, six of them curving round a corner. Between the bays are piers with foliated capitals, containing roundels, sculpted in the ground floor. The ground floor windows have cambered heads, those in the upper floor have round heads, and all have Gothic hood moulds containing alternately coloured voussoirs. The doorways have flat lintels and lobed arches. In front of the building are squat piers with segmental pedimented heads, and between them is Gothic ironwork. | II |
| 35 and 37 Station Road; 53.71050°N 1.62505°W | — | c. 1870 | A pair of warehouses in stone, the ground floor rock-faced, with quoins, moulded sill bands, a moulded eaves cornice on triangular brackets, and a slate roof. There are four storeys and a symmetrical front of four bays. The round-headed doorways in the outer bays and the windows in the lower two storeys have rock-faced voussoirs and surrounds. The windows in the second floor are round headed with quoined surrounds, and those in the top floor have segmental arches. | II |
| Batley Barless Fire Company; 53.71199°N 1.62718°W | | c. 1870 | A shop and offices on a corner site, the building is in stone with sill bands, a moulded eaves cornice, and a slate roof. There are three storeys and a basement, four bays on each side, and a curved bay on the corner. On the Hick Lane front is a portico with Tuscan columns, a full entablature, and a pediment, and the door has a fanlight. The windows in the ground floor have round arches, aprons, and cornices on consoles, in the middle floor they are round-arched with vermiculated keystones, and in the top floor they have segmental heads. | II |
| Methodist Sunday School; 53.71216°N 1.62820°W | — | 1870 | The former Sunday school is in stone, with rusticated quoins, an eaves cornice with moulded brackets, and a hipped slate roof. There are two storeys, a front of five bays, and six bays along the sides. The central doorway and the ground floor windows have segmental-arched heads and a continuous impost band. The windows in the upper floor have round heads and rusticated voussoirs, those on the front divided into two tiers. | II |
| Former Staincliffe Vicarage; 53.70823°N 1.65241°W | — | 1870 | The former vicarage was designed by W. H. Crossland, it is in stone, and has a slate roof with numerous coped gables. There are two storeys and an attic, and three bays. The central porch is gabled and has buttresses and a hood mould with the date. To the right is a two-storey canted bay window, and the other windows are mullioned and transomed. | II |
| The Xclusiv; 53.71004°N 1.62419°W | — | c. 1870 | A warehouse and office, later a club, in Italian Gothic style, it is in stone with a brick parapet. The building has been reduced to one storey, and has a flat roof and a curved front of seven bays. The central doorway has pilasters with square pedestals and foliated capitals. Above it is a round arch containing an oculus, and a Gothic arch, all in a square surround with carved spandrels. There is a similar doorway in the right bay. The other bays contain windows with blind arches and Gothic arched hoods with alternately coloured voussoirs. | II |
| St Saviour's Church, Brown Hill; 53.72855°N 1.65640°W | | 1870–71 | The church, which is in Early English style, is built in stone with a slate roof. It consists of a nave with a clerestory, north and south aisles, a south porch, a chancel, and a south vestry. The east window consists of triple lancets, and the west window is blind. | II |
| Purlwell Infant School; 53.70718°N 1.64018°W | | 1873–74 | The school is in stone and has a slate roof with chamfered gable copings. There is a single storey, with gabled cross-wings at the ends. In the centre is a gabled block containing three lancet windows, and to its left is a square tower with and entrance and a louvred bell openings and a saddleback roof. Between these are blocks with gablets and gabled entrances. At the extreme right is a lower tower with a pyramidal roof. | II |
| Wall, gate piers and gates, Infant school 53.70697°N 1.64014°W | — | 1873–74 | The wall enclosing the school grounds are in stone, and incorporate three pairs of carved gate piers with moulded caps. In the centre are iron gates with an inscription. | II |
| 1–12 Market Place and 2, 4, 6 and 7 Back Providence Street; 53.71444°N 1.63401°W | — | c. 1875 | A row of eight shops on a curved and sloping site, they are in stone with impost bands, sill bands, bracketed eaves, and slate roofs. There are three storeys, in the ground floor are shop fronts, and above are sash windows with round, segmental or flat heads, some of them tripartite. Above the two central shops are round-headed dormers, and to the left is a gabled dormer. | II |
| 231 Bradford Road; 53.70286°N 1.63004°W | — | c. 1875 | A stone warehouse in Italianate style, on a vermiculated plinth, with quoins, a bracketed cornice, and a Welsh slate roof. There are three storeys, and the front facing the street has three bays. The ground floor is rusticated, and in the left bay is a round-headed doorway with an ornate surround, fluted pilasters, a fanlight, and a segmental pediment on paired brackets containing a cartouche. To the right are segmental-headed sash windows with vermiculated keystones and panelled aprons. The middle floor contains casement windows with pediments, two with false balconies, and in the top floor are casement windows with segmental heads, and decorative surrounds. | II |
| Bagshaw Museum; 53.72790°N 1.64543°W | | 1875 | A large house, The Woodlands, converted into a museum in 1911. It is in stone on a plinth, with a moulded impost band, moulded eaves, and a steep slate roof with coped gables, kneelers, and finials. There are two storeys and attics, and fronts of five bays. The two left bays are gabled and have two storeys and an attic, to the right is a four-storey tower, and to the right of this are two two-storey bays. In the ground floor of the tower is a doorway with a moulded surround, and at the top is a square copper-clad pyramidal roof with an ornate iron crown. The windows are sashes, in the ground floor with flat heads, and those in the upper floor with pointed heads. | II* |
| Park Road School, walls and gates 53.71514°N 1.62945°W | | 1877 | The school and schoolmaster's house, which are in Gothic Revival style, are in stone on a chamfered plinth, with quoins, and roofs with coped gables, kneelers, and finials. There are two storeys, eleven bays on the front and 14 bays at the rear on the left. On the front is a two-storey gabled porch with a pointed arch and a datestone. To the left is a gabled wing with a large pointed window with wheel tracery. To the right is a four-bay gabled wing, a lower four-bay block, and two large gabled wings. In front of the grounds is a stone wall containing square chamfered piers with pyramidal caps, ornate iron railings, and a cast iron gate. | II |
| Former Barclays Bank, wall and gate piers 53.71269°N 1.62866°W | | 1877 | The former bank and manager's house, later used for other purposes, is in stone, with paired moulded gutter brackets, and a slate roof with coped gables and finials. There are three storeys and seven bays. In the left bay is a gabled porch flanked by three engaged columns with foliate capitals, the doorway has a round inscribed arch with coats of arms in the tympanum, and in the gable is diapering and the date. The windows have engaged colonnettes, and those in the right three bays have hood moulds. In front of the building are stone walls with iron railings and gate piers with octagonal pointed caps. | II |
| St John's Church, Carlinghow; 53.72068°N 1.64724°W | | 1878–79 | The church, which is in Gothic Revival style, is built in stone with a slate roof. It consists of a nave with a clerestory, north and south aisles, a chancel, and a north vestry. At the western end of the south aisle is the base of an unbuilt tower that forms a porch, with buttresses and a round angle turret. | II |
| 233 Bradford Road; 53.70291°N 1.62989°W | — | c. 1880 | A warehouse in stone on a rusticated plinth, with quoins, bracketed eaves, and a Welsh slate roof. There are three storeys, a front of four bays, and eleven bays in the right return. The windows are sashes, in the ground floor with round heads, a moulded impost band, and ornate carved keystones. In the right return some of the windows in the ground floor have round heads, the rest have square heads, and there is a cart entrance. | II |
| 51 Station Road; 53.71013°N 1.62398°W | — | c. 1880 | Offices and a warehouse, later used for other purposes, the building is in stone on a corner site, with moulded string courses and a slate roof. There are three storeys and a basement, seven bays curving round the corner, and on the left is a single gabled bay. In the left bay, steps lead up to a porch with red granite columns and richly carved capitals, a cornice carved with foliage, and a keystone with a carved bust. In the gable pediment is a shield flanked by figures, and on the apex is a squatting dog. In the other bays, the ground floor windows are round headed with carved voussoirs and keystones. The upper floor windows are square-headed, in the middle floor is a decorated frieze, and at the top is a decorative cornice and a perforated parapet. On the right corner is a round turret with a conical roof. | II |
| Cross Bank Methodist Sunday School; 53.71624°N 1.64047°W | | 1882 | The former Sunday school is in stone with a hipped slate roof, two storeys, five bays at the front and seven bays along the sides. The middle three bays on the front project under an open pediment with a vase acroterion. It contains a central doorway above which is an open segmental pediment containing an inscription. Flanking the doorway are pilasters with foliated impost bands and round-headed windows with keystones. In the upper floor are three windows divided by red granite colonnettes, flanked by pilasters with foliated capitals, over them are arches with carvings in the tympani, and under the outer windows are tiled panels. The windows in the outer bays and along the sides have round-arched heads and impost bands, those in the upper floor with hood moulds and alternately coloured voussoirs. | II |
| Hyrstlands; 53.70434°N 1.64117°W | — | 1891 | A large house, later used for other purposes, it is in stone, with a moulded string course, a moulded eaves cornice, and a hipped slate roof. There are two storeys, a double pile plan, and fronts of seven and five bays. The bays on the front are divided by pilasters, rusticated on the ground floor, and above they are Ionic and surmounted by ball finials on moulded bases. The middle bay projects and rises to a square tower with a pyramidal roof. The central doorway and flanking windows have blind arches with carved foliage, above them is an oriel window with a cornice and a balustrade, and to the right is a canted bay window and a conservatory. | II |
| Public Baths; 53.71256°N 1.63436°W | | 1893 | The public baths are in stone with slate roofs. The central entrance block has three storeys. In the ground floor are four transomed windows flanked by doorways with moulded surrounds, fanlights, and swagged pediments. In the middle floor are two cross windows with pilasters and entablature hoods, and between them is a panel containing a winged cherub, and at the top are two dormer windows with pedimented gables and finials. The block is flanked by single-storey wings containing five circular windows, between them are Doric pilasters, and above them is an entablature with a balustrade and urns at the ends. | II |
| Former Technical School; 53.71257°N 1.63469°W | | 1893 | The building is in stone, and has slate roofs with coped gables, and four blocks. The left block is gabled with a ball finial, and contains a mullioned and transomed window in each floor and a semicircular window above with a carved keystone. The block to the right is lower and contains a doorway on the left with a moulded surround and a semicircular fanlight. The next block is gabled with two storeys, and contains mullioned windows with entablatures, and between the storeys is an inscribed tablet. The right block has three storeys, and to the left is a segmental-headed doorway with a moulded surround and a mermaid keystone. The windows in the lower two floors are cross mullions, and in the top floor are dormer windows breaking through the eaves with pediments. | II |
| Former Midland Bank; 53.71191°N 1.62752°W | — | 1890s | The former bank building, which is in Classical style, is in stone, with quoins and the ground floor rusticated, a moulded eaves cornice on console brackets, and a hipped slate roof. There are two storeys, a symmetrical front of five bays, and four bays along the sides. In the centre is a round-arched porch with a full entablature, and balcony on festooned consoles. The flanking windows have round-arched heads, rusticated voussoirs, and keystones carved with heads. The windows in the upper floor have flat heads, architraves and cornices, the middle window has a segmental pediment. and the outer windows have balustrades. | II |
| Former National Westminster Bank; 53.71172°N 1.62734°W | — | c. 1905 | The former bank and manager's house were designed by Ernest Newton, and are in stone on a plinth, with a ground floor impost band, a deeply dentilled cornice, and hipped slate roofs. There are two storeys, four bays on the front, and three bays on the right side of the bank. In the ground floor is a semicircular window with a round-arched doorway to the left, and a round-arched casement window to the right. The outer bays of the upper floor contain French windows with balconies and wrought iron balustrades, and in the middle bays are sash windows. On the side is another semicircular window and three windows above, the middle one blind. All the openings have keystones. To the right is the manager's house that has a doorway with a moulded surround and casement windows. | II |
| Public Library; 53.71378°N 1.63425°W | | 1906 | A Carnegie library, it is in stone with a hipped slate roof. There are two storeys and a basement, and a symmetrical front of five bays. The middle and outer bays have pediments containing carved tympani, the middle one also with an oculus. The central round-arched doorway has paired engaged Ionic columns, a segmental archivolt, and rich carving with foliage, shields and the date. Above it is an arched window with an inscribed panel below. The ground floor windows are round-headed with alternately blocked voussoirs, and the windows in the upper floor have flat heads and are divided by Ionic pilasters. In the centre of the roof is a two-stage clock tower with a leaded dome and a cupola. | II |
| War memorial 53.71311°N 1.63389°W | | 1923 | The war memorial is in the centre of the War Memorial Gardens, and consists of a bronze statue of a soldier standing and holding a rifle. The statue is on a square stone column with an inscription, on a square base with a cornice. Surrounding it is a circular wall with iron railings containing four iron gates. On the wall are plaques with the names of those lost in the two World Wars and other conflicts. | II |
| Pair of telephone kiosks 53.71399°N 1.63415°W | | 1935 | The telephones kiosks are on the north side of the public library. They are the K6 type, designed by Giles Gilbert Scott, and constructed in cast iron with a square plan and a dome. The kiosks have replacement Elizabeth II crowns in the top panels. | II |
