= Leslie V. Woodcock =

Leslie Victor Woodcock (born 20 May 1945, Batley) is Emeritus Professor of Chemical Thermodynamics at the University of Manchester. He has also held appointments at the University of Cambridge, the University of Amsterdam, and the University of Bradford. He has worked with simulations for the U.S. Air Force.

Woodcock received his Ph.D. in London in 1970. His work in the field of molecular dynamics includes one of the first simulations of ionic liquids and development of the WAC model of liquid silica.
