= Batley Variety Club =

Variety club in West Yorkshire, England

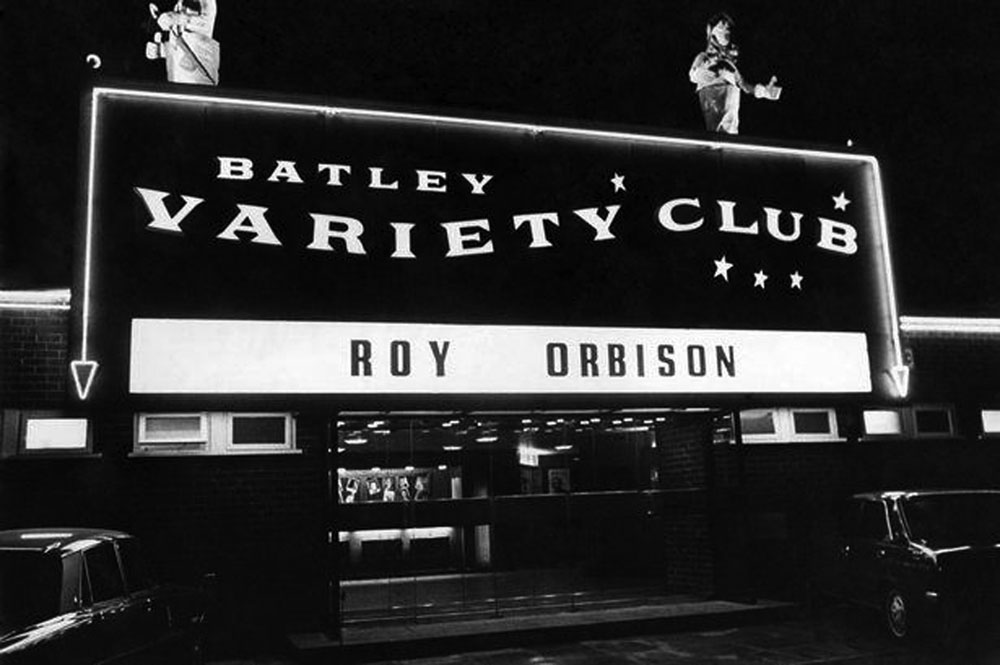
- Iconic sign at Batley Variety Club

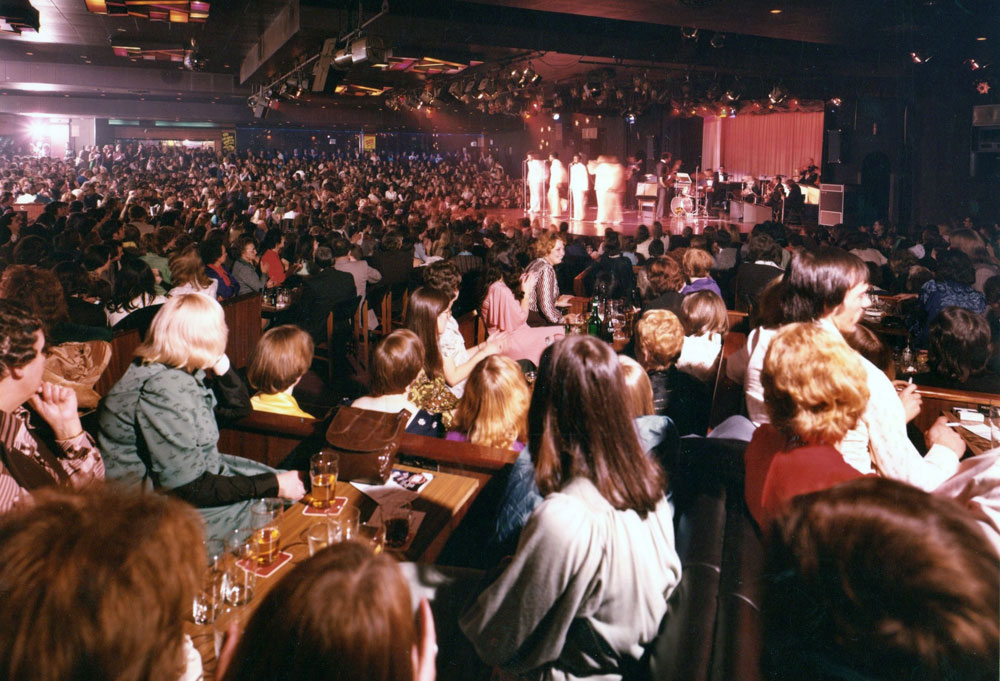
- Batley Variety Club interior
- Interactive map of the Batley Variety Club area

General information
- Location: 260 Bradford Road, Batley, West Yorkshire, United Kingdom
- Coordinates: 53.7065°N 1.6266°W
- Construction started: January 1967
- Completed: March 1967

Batley Variety Club was a variety club in Batley, West Yorkshire, England. During its existence, the club staged concerts by performers including Louis Armstrong, Shirley Bassey, Tom Jones, Roy Orbison, Eartha Kitt, Morecambe and Wise, Gene Pitney, Neil Sedaka, Ken Dodd, Helen Shapiro and Johnny Mathis. At the peak of its success, the club had 300,000 members. It closed about 1978 and reopened as "Crumpets" night club. It closed again shortly afterwards and its contents were auctioned off. It reopened as the "Frontier" in the early 1980s and this eventually closed in 2016.

On hearing the news that the building was no longer to be used as a venue, singer Shirley Bassey commented, "I have many happy memories of singing at the Batley Variety Club so sorry to hear it is closing." The building was converted to a gym in 2017.

== Origins ==
The club was designed and built by James and Betty Corrigan in early 1967 on top of a disused sewage site on Bradford Road in Batley. The build was interrupted when local authority inspectors discovered that the building was six inches too close to the road. Demolition took place and work continued but, despite this setback, the club managed to open on 27 March 1967 as planned. The headline act on opening night was The Bachelors.

The Corrigans had travelled to Las Vegas to research how the clubs worked there in order to work out a design for Batley. The ground floor of the club was excavated so that on entering, the public would walk down to their tables which would be arranged in tiers, five in all, forming a horseshoe embracing the stage from the bottom up, thus giving the audience unobstructed views. The ceilings were low, offering an intimate atmosphere, and the resident band was situated at the back of the stage rather than in a traditional orchestra pit so that the artistes could be closer to the audience. The club held 1,750 people seated, with standing room for more, and it was this large capacity which facilitated low admission prices for major acts. Food was served in baskets with plastic cutlery to avoid clinking noises that could disturb the acts on stage. There were two long bars that ran down either side of the club.

== Performers and events ==
The club was known as the "Las Vegas of the North" and attracted the best acts in show business, both from the UK and USA. James Corrigan travelled with the booking agent, Bernard Hinchcliffe, to the USA to attract major acts, and offered Dean Martin's manager £45,000 for a booking, but the manager replied that Martin would not "get out of bed for a piss for that amount". Undeterred, Corrigan and Hinchliffe travelled to New York to meet Joe Glaser of Associated Booking Corporation and secured the booking of Louis Armstrong for £27,000. Corrigan revealed this figure to the press and later said this was a big mistake as it led other agents to believe that "Batley had very deep pockets" and would ask for bigger fees for their artists and subsequently cause problems for the club. When Corrigan went to Capri to bring Gracie Fields out of semi-retirement to play at the club, Fields asked Cilla Black what fee she thought she should ask for. Black's husband, Bobby Willis, recommended that she asked for "the same as Satchmo [Louis Armstrong] got".

The format of the nights was generally a speciality support act followed by the headline act, and all would be held together by a compère. The regular compère was Jerry Brooke. Headline artists were booked for a week-long run, from Sunday night to the following Saturday, sometimes longer. The biggest draw to the club, Shirley Bassey, was sometimes booked for three-week runs.

Many of the artistes stayed as guests of the Corrigans at their home in Batley, Oaks Cottage. Dame Vera Lynn and Eartha Kitt cooked for their hosts. During her stay in Batley, Kitt sampled tripe at the local market and joined the shoppers in a chorus of "On Ilkla Moor Baht 'at". During one of Shirley Bassey's appearances, James Corrigan invited her out for dinner, and she dressed up in a fur coat thinking she was being taken to a restaurant, but instead she was driven to a fish and chip shop in the back of Corrigan's Rolls-Royce.

The club was a boost to the local economy, with nearby restaurants, flower shops, clothes shops and taxi firms benefiting financially from the attraction of the club.

Roy Orbison's album, Live From Batley Variety Club, was recorded on 9 May 1969. It was re-released as Roy Orbison - Authorized Bootleg Collection by Orbison Records in 1999. BBC Radio recorded a performance from the first week of Gracie Fields' first performance, which was broadcast on 5 January 1969, and Philips made a recording of a performance from the second week, with a view to a commercial issue, which Fields later rejected. The only song not broadcast by the BBC was Fields' encore of "There'll Always Be an England". Some of the recording made by the BBC was later issued on the album, The Best of the BBC Broadcasts.

In 1974, Maurice Gibb of the Bee Gees met his future wife Yvonne Spenceley while he was playing at the club and she was working as a waitress. Gibb said, "I just saw her eyes and said to myself, 'This is the woman I'm going to marry'." A week later, she handed in her notice at the club and announced she was going on tour with the band.

In 1977, the club hosted Katharine, Duchess of Kent, for a charity night to raise funds for the Queen's Silver Jubilee Appeal.

== Closure ==
Batley Variety Club closed in 1978 when the Corrigans separated. It re-opened briefly as Crumpets nightclub by Betty Corrigan, before reopening as the Frontier Club in the early 1980s. The Frontier remained open until 2016. The building still stands and has been converted to a gym.

In 2017, there was a campaign for civic recognition for the contribution that James Corrigan and Batley Variety Club made to the area.

== King of Clubs ==
The book, King of Clubs (2017), written by Maureen Prest, recounts the history of Batley Variety Club and the life of James Corrigan. Prest worked in PR for the club.
