= Batley =

Town in West Yorkshire, England

Coordinates: 53°43′00″N 01°38′08″W

- Town
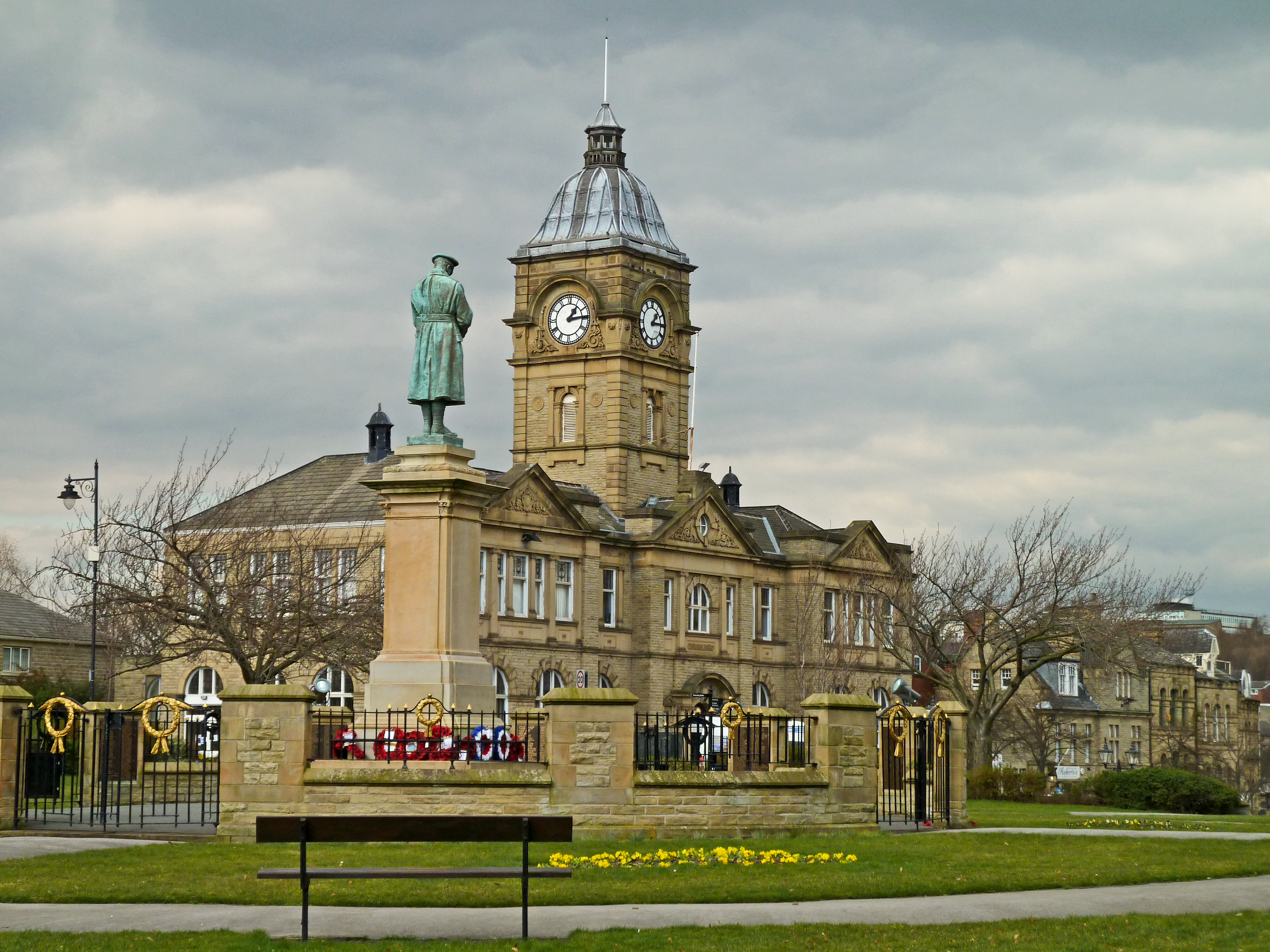
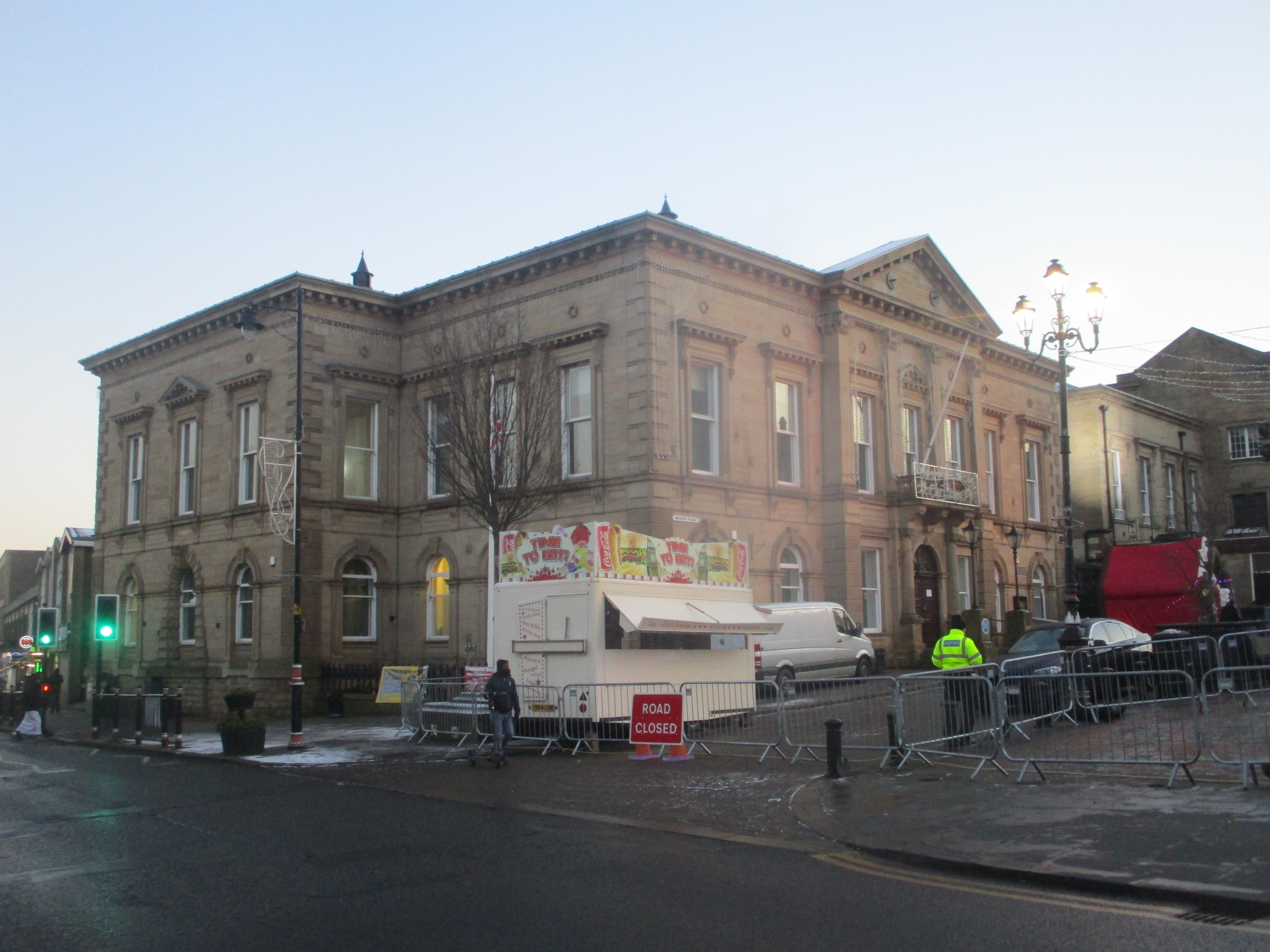
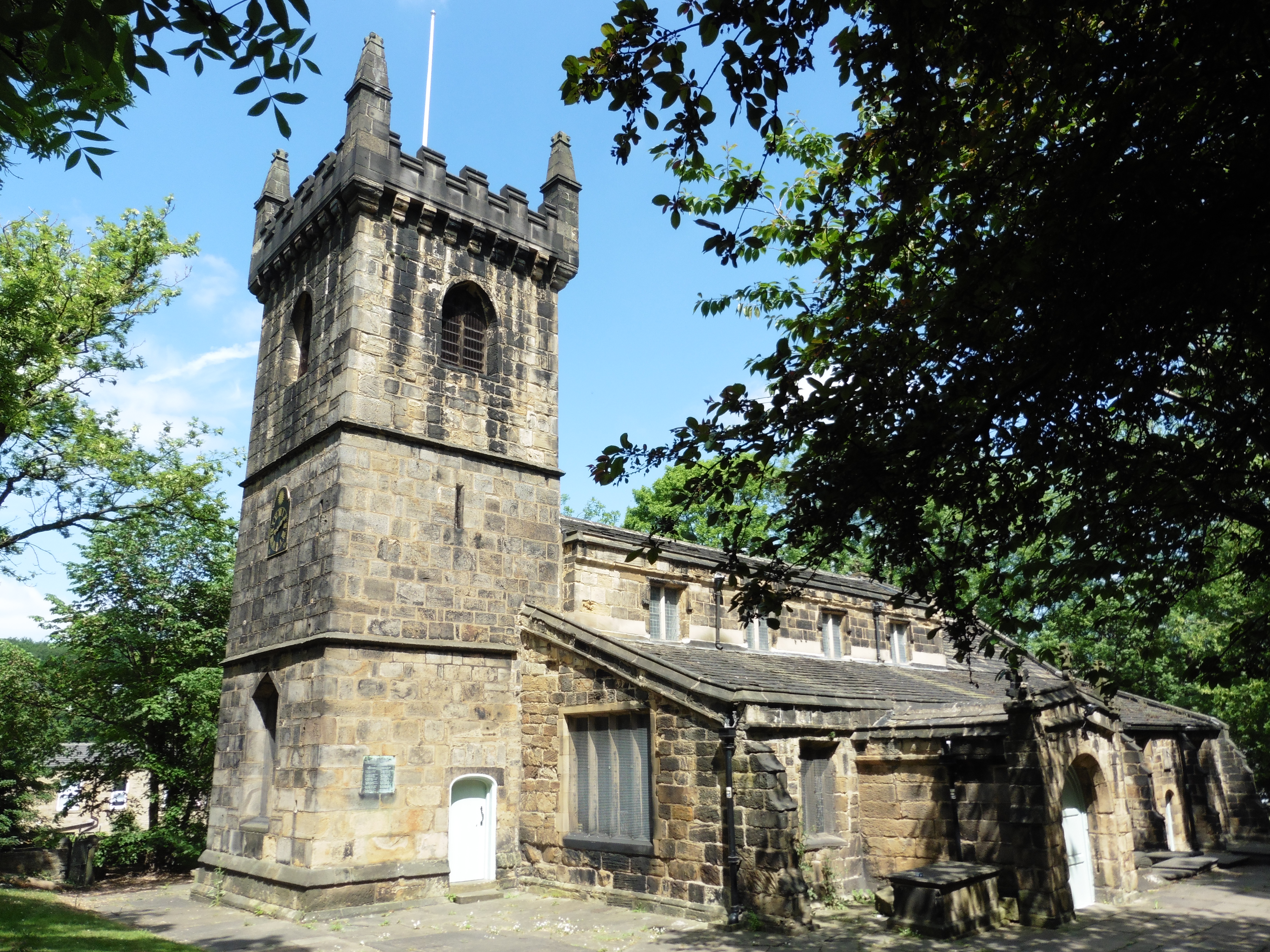
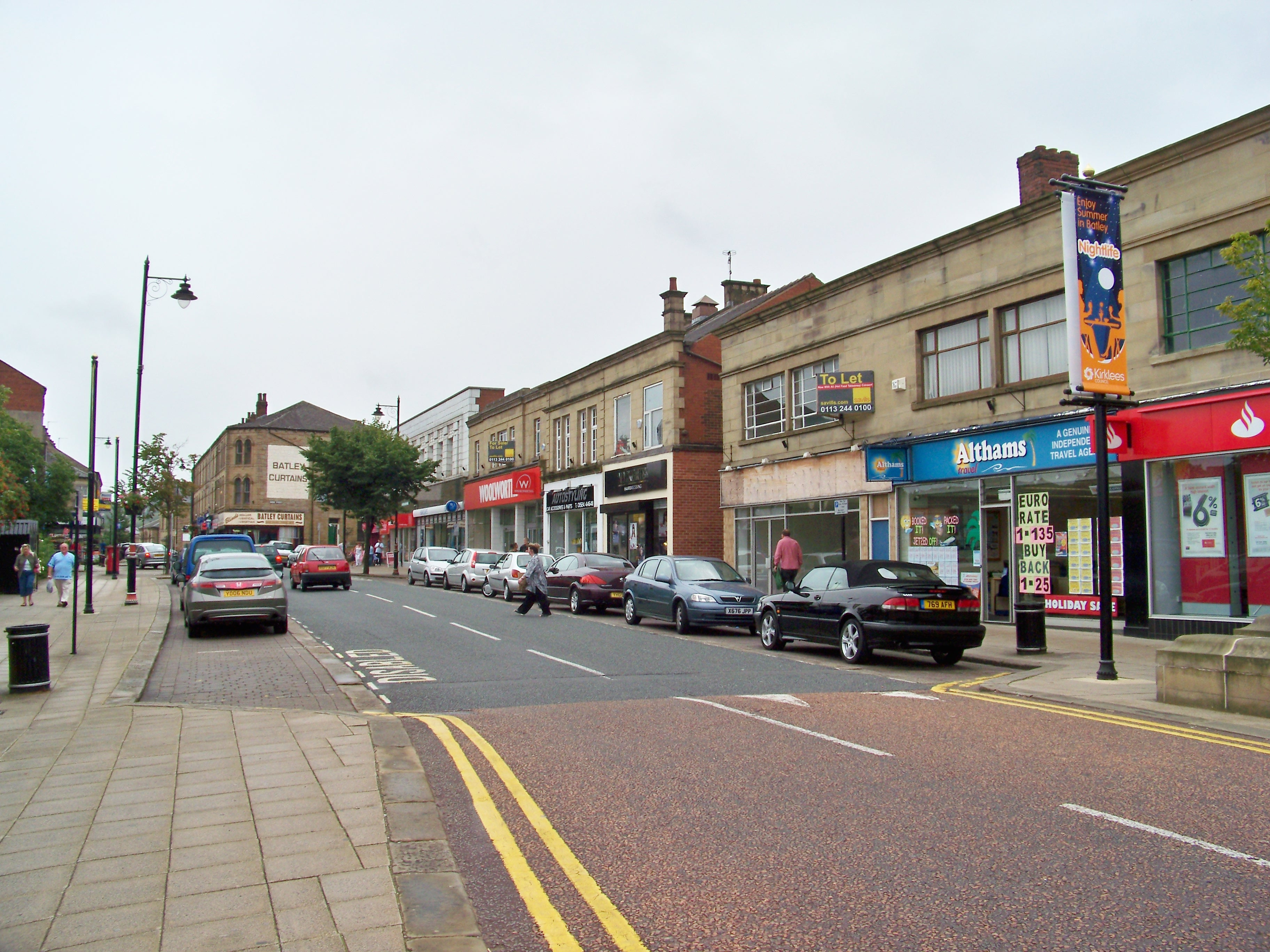
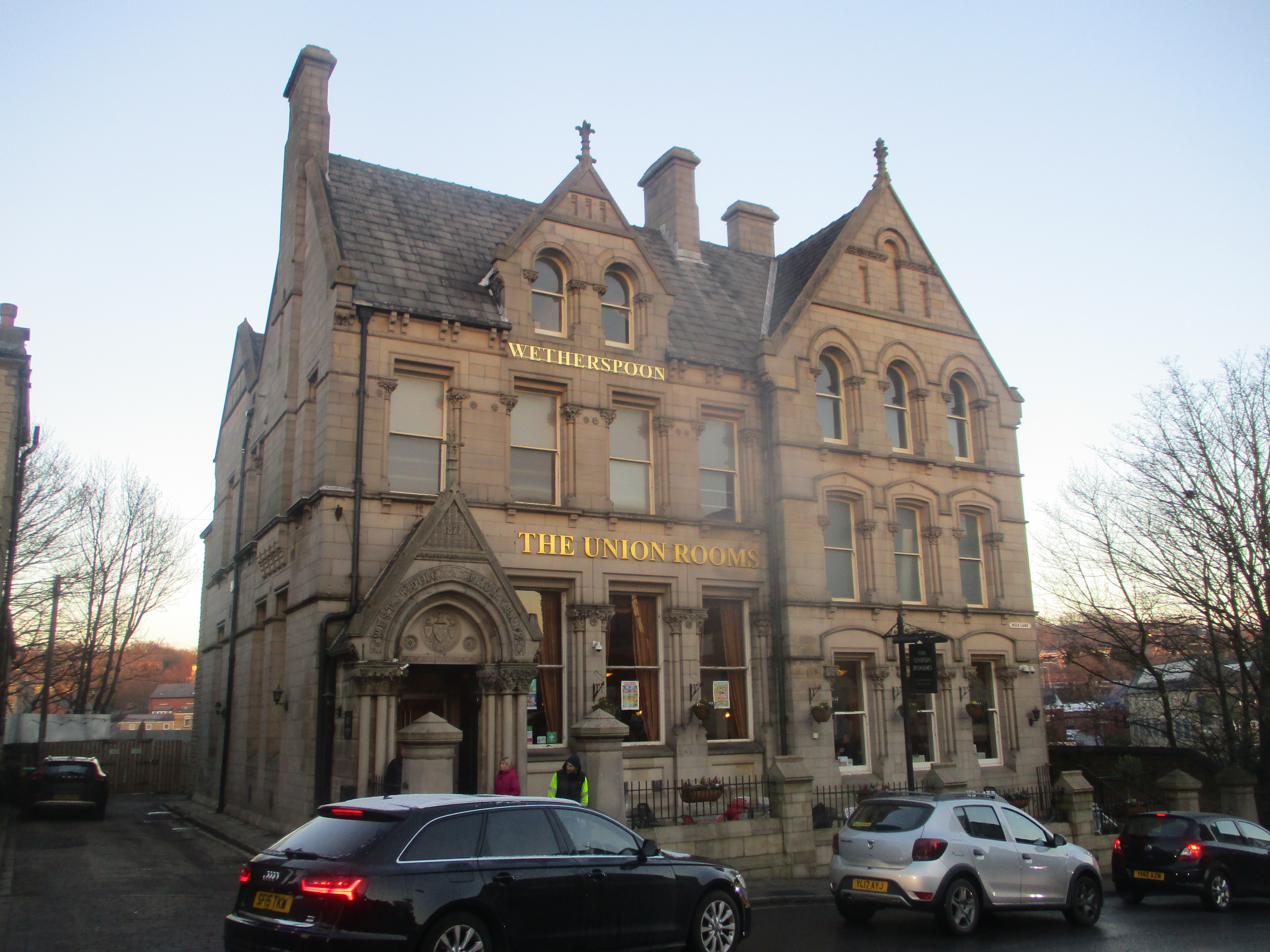
- Clockwise from top: Batley Library and War Memorial, All Saints' Church, Union Rooms on Hick Lane, Commercial Street, Town Hall

- Location within West Yorkshire
- Population: 39,013 (Wards, 2021 Census)
- OS grid reference: SE245245
- Metropolitan borough: Kirklees
- Metropolitan county: West Yorkshire
- Region: Yorkshire and the Humber
- Country: England
- Sovereign state: United Kingdom
- Areas of the town: List: Batley Carr; Carlinghow; Hanging Heaton (part); Healey; Soothill; Staincliffe
- Post town: BATLEY
- Postcode district: WF17
- Dialling code: 01924
- Police: West Yorkshire
- Fire: West Yorkshire
- Ambulance: Yorkshire
- UK Parliament: Dewsbury and Batley

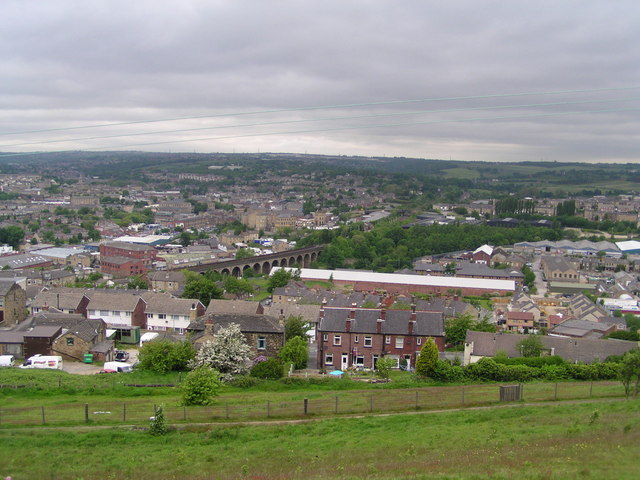
Skyline of Batley

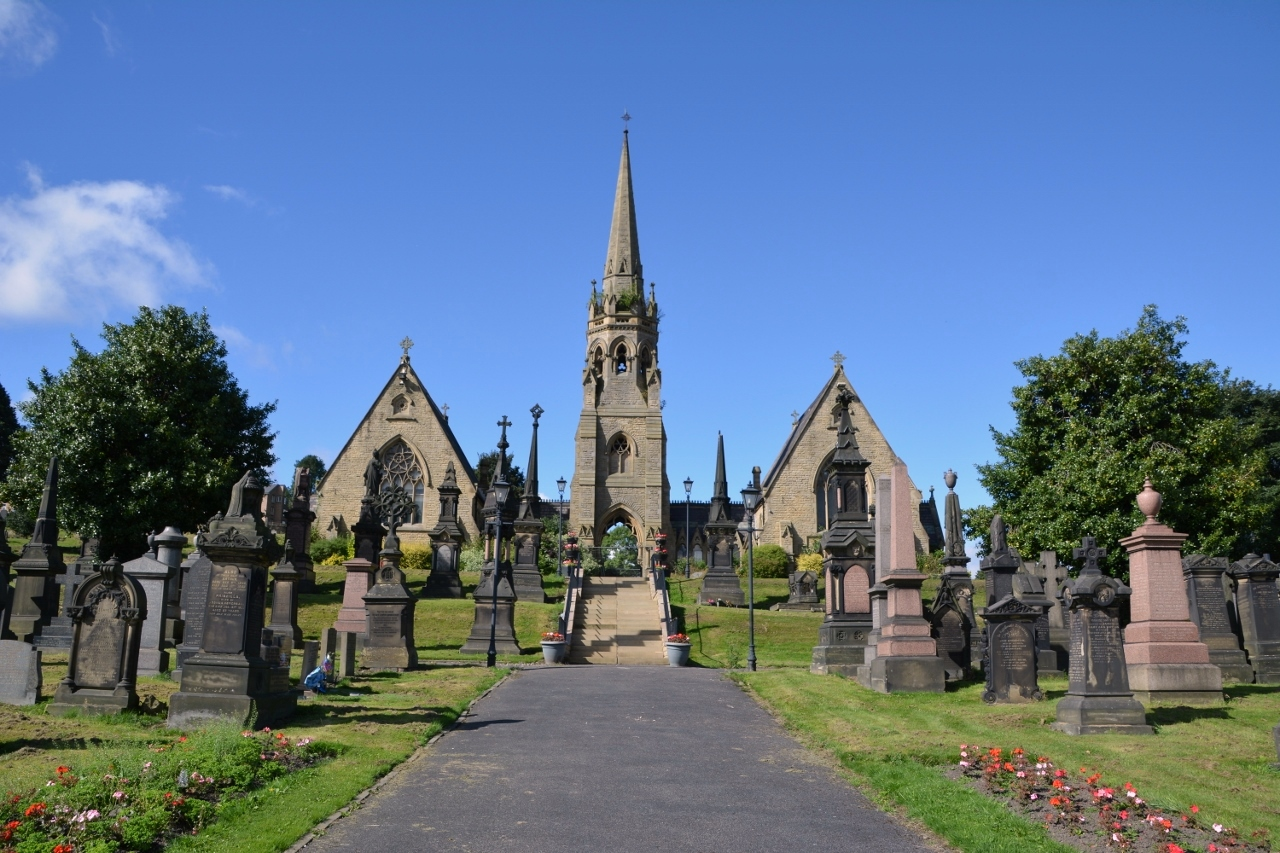
Batley Cemetery

Batley is a market town in the Kirklees district, in West Yorkshire, England, south-west of Leeds, north-west of Wakefield and Dewsbury, south-east of Bradford and north-east of Huddersfield, in the Heavy Woollen District. In 2011, the population was 48,730.

Batley Town Hall, designed in the neoclassical style, was paid for by public subscription and opened as the local mechanics' institute in 1854. The town was the home of Batley Variety Club, which was frequented by many notable musical acts, from 1967 onwards.

== History ==
=== Middle Ages ===
The name Batley is derived from the Old English Batalēah meaning 'Bata's wood or clearing'.

Batley is recorded in the Domesday Book as 'Bateleia'. After the Norman Conquest, the manor was granted to Ilbert de Lacy and in 1086 was within the wapentake of Morley. It subsequently passed into the ownership of the de Batleys, and by the 12th century had passed by marriage to the Copley family. Their residence at Batley Hall was held directly from the Crown; at this time the district was part of the Duchy of Lancaster.

There has been a church in Batley since the 11th century. Batley Parish Church was built in 1485 and contains parts of a 13th-century predecessor. Despite Batley being an ancient settlement, this is all that remains of any great antiquity.

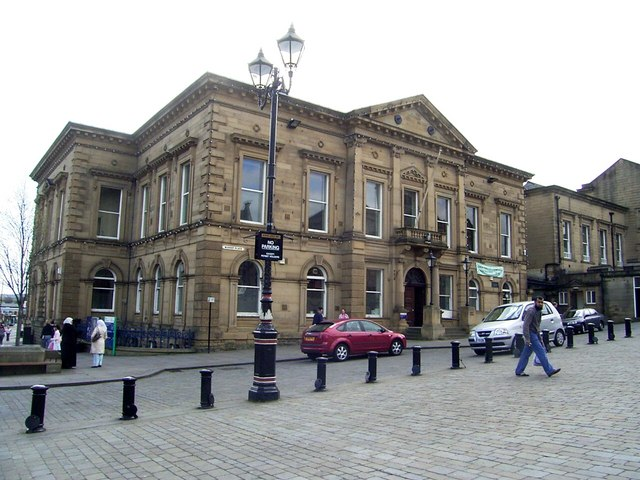
Batley Town Hall

Howley Hall in Soothill was built during the 1580s by Sir John Savile, a member of the great Yorkshire landowners, the Savile family. The house was besieged during the English Civil War in 1643 before the Battle of Adwalton Moor but appears to have sustained no serious damage. It continued to be occupied during the 17th century but fell into disrepair. Howley Hall was destroyed in 1730. Among the numerous ruins that are still present are the cellars of its great hall.

Methodism came to Batley in the 1740s through the evangelism of John Nelson, a lay preacher from Birstall and frequent companion of the movement's founder John Wesley. Two leading figures in the early Methodist movement, John William Fletcher and Mary Bosanquet, were married at All Saints Church in Batley in 1781. By the 1780s meetings were being held in the town and the first Methodist chapel was established around 1800.

=== Industrial Revolution ===
During the late 18th century, the main occupations in the town were farming and weaving. The Industrial Revolution reached Batley in 1796 with the arrival of its first water powered mills for carding and spinning. During the next half century the population grew rapidly, from around 2,500 at the start of the 19th century to 9,308 at the 1851 census. The parish of Batley at this point included Morley, Churwell and Gildersome, with a total population of 17,359.

Before the industrial revolution, wool was made in Batley for centuries as a cottage industry. Samuel Jubb, a 19th-century mill owner and local historian, noted that this was "a manufacture for which the place is well adapted, on account of its possessing a good supply of water and coal, and its central situation in relation to the principal local markets, being about equidistant from Leeds, Huddersfield, Bradford, Halifax, and Wakefield." The water he referred to was not the beck but the large aquifer beneath the town, which was tapped for cleaning and dying wool.

A toll road built in 1832 between Gomersal and Dewsbury had a branch to Batley (the present day Branch Road) which allowed for "the growing volumes of wool, cloth and coal" to be transported. Until then there had only been foot and cart tracks. Around the same time there were strikes in the mills, which led to an influx of Irish workers who settled permanently. Initially this led to antagonism from residents, due to the lower wages paid to the Irish workers and general anti-Roman Catholic sentiment, but this faded in time. By 1853 Catholic services were held regularly in the town; its first Roman Catholic church, St Mary of the Angels, was not built until 1870 and is still in existence.

By 1848 there was a railway station in Batley, and in 1853 Batley Town Hall was erected. It was enlarged in 1905, and is in the Neoclassical style, with a corbelled parapet and pilasters rising to a centre pediment. In 1868 Batley was incorporated as a municipal borough, the former urban district of Birstall was added to it in 1937.

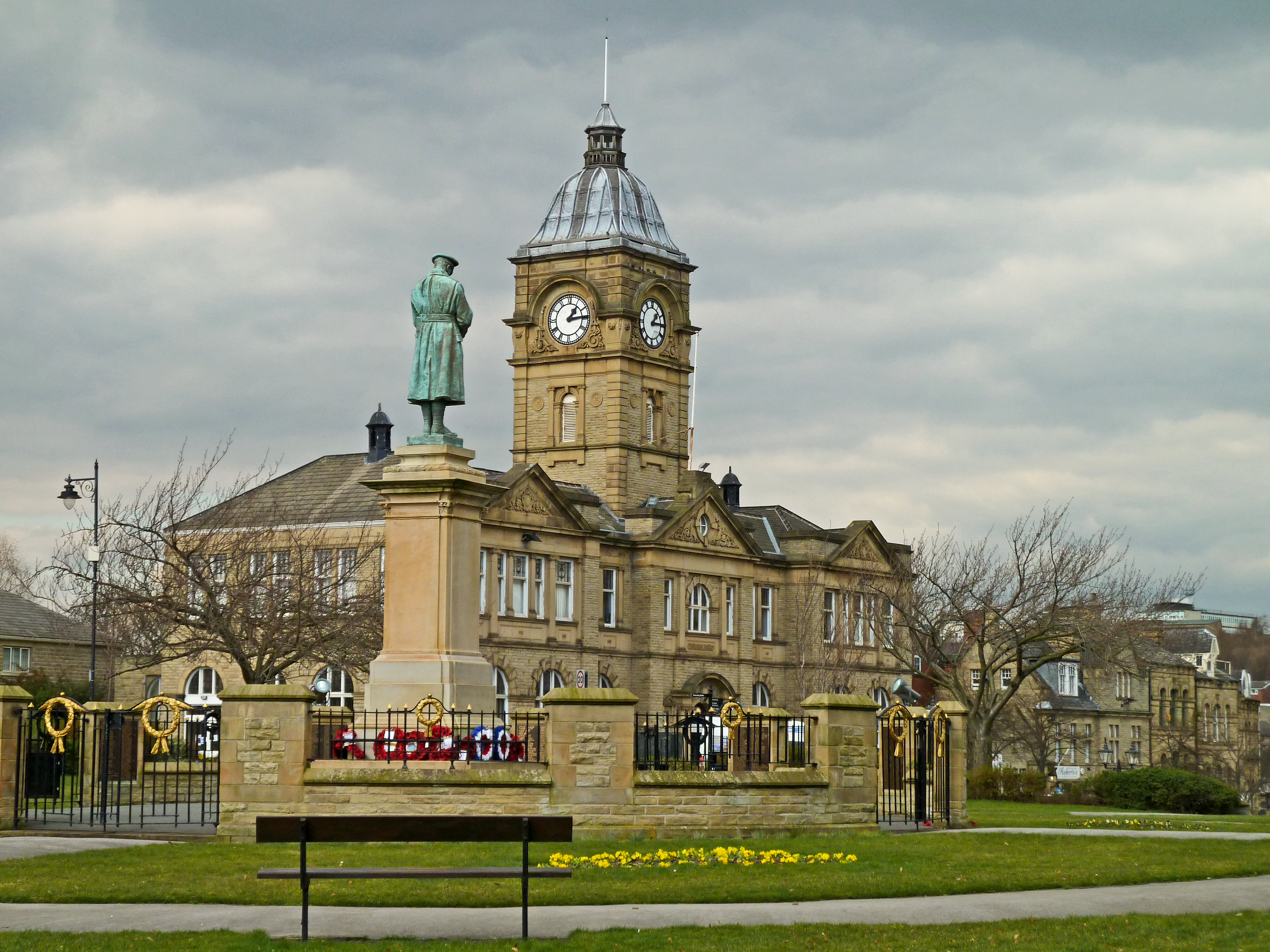
Batley Library

1853 also saw the establishment of a small confectionery shop by Michael Spedding. His business expanded, moving to larger premises in 1927 becoming Fox's Biscuits. Today, along with Tesco, it is one of the largest employers in the town.

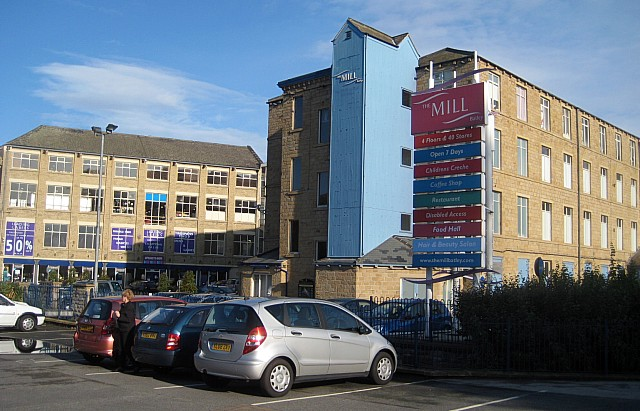
The Mill, Batley

During the late 19th century, Batley was the centre of the shoddy and mungo trade in which wool, rags and clothes were recycled by reweaving them into blankets, carpets and uniforms. In 1861 there were at least 30 shoddy mills in Batley. The owners of the recycling businesses were known as the "shoddy barons". There was a "shoddy king" and a "shoddy temple", properly known as the Zion Chapel. This imposing building in the town centre was opened in 1870, and reflected the popularity of the Methodist movement. The chapel is still active today. In 1875 local woman Ann Ellis led a weavers strike against the shoddy mill owners who were planning to reduce wages.

At the close of the 19th century, growth in population changed the form of governmental institutions above the parish of Batley; the Morley division of the wapentake of Agbrigg and Morley was disused as special purpose districts were formed.

The library was built in 1907 with funds donated by the philanthropist Andrew Carnegie. The library has been modernised, with a microfilm viewer, and reels of the Batley News dating back 120 years. The newspaper was founded by James Fearnsides – a local printer. His grandson, Clement, later became the mayor of Batley. The first records of coal mining in Batley date back to the 16th century at White Lee; the last pit in the town closed in 1973.

=== Post-industrial history ===
On the nights of 14 and 15 March 1941, the West Yorkshire area as a whole was subject to a Nazi air raid. Batley came through relatively unscathed with one unexploded ordnance being located near the Healey Mill area (opposite Healey Community Centre to be precise) whilst Cleckheaton, located 2.5 miles (4.0 km) north-west, suffered from seven bombs that exploded as intended. Leeds, located 6 miles (9.7 km) north-east, went through two nights of damage as, "The raid caused more than 100 serious fires, damaged over 4,500 buildings and resulted in 65 people losing their lives."

The manufacture of shoddy continued into the postwar period. A doctor posted to Batley hospital in 1952 described the town as "one of the last reminders of the industrial revolution as described by Dickens", riven by economic inequality and 'Victorian' diseases like rickets:

In mid-winter, the hospital enjoyed brilliant sunshine on the snow-covered moors on either side of the narrow valley, reminiscent of Wuthering Heights. Nearby were the manor houses of the mill owners, flaunting Rolls-Royces in their porches. The town in the valley was, however, permanently enveloped in a thick blanket of smog spewed from the factory chimneys. The narrow valley was paved with cobbled stones with workers' houses interspersed between the factories. [...] Excess water due to rainfall or melting snow would enter the dwellings over their thresholds.

In 1974, responsibility for local government passed to Kirklees Metropolitan Council, with its headquarters in Huddersfield.

=== 21st century ===
Batley's Labour MP Jo Cox was shot and stabbed to death outside her constituency surgery in Birstall in June 2016. The politically motivated murder, carried out by a local man in the name of white supremacy, was the first assassination of a sitting British MP since 1990. Her seat was filled by Labour candidate Tracy Brabin in a by-election later the same year, uncontested by the other major parties.

Brabin was elected the first Mayor of West Yorkshire in 2021, triggering a high-profile by-election in which Labour expected to struggle to retain the formerly safe red wall seat. Former Labour MP George Galloway ran for the Workers Party of Britain, on a platform criticising newly elected Labour leader Keir Starmer and targeting issues important to the local South Asian Muslim community. Labour candidate Kim Leadbeater, the sister of Jo Cox, ultimately won the election by a narrow margin, following a campaign focused on local issues. The governing Conservative's surprise loss was blamed on poor campaigning and a scandal involving Health Secretary Matt Hancock in the weekend prior to the by-election.

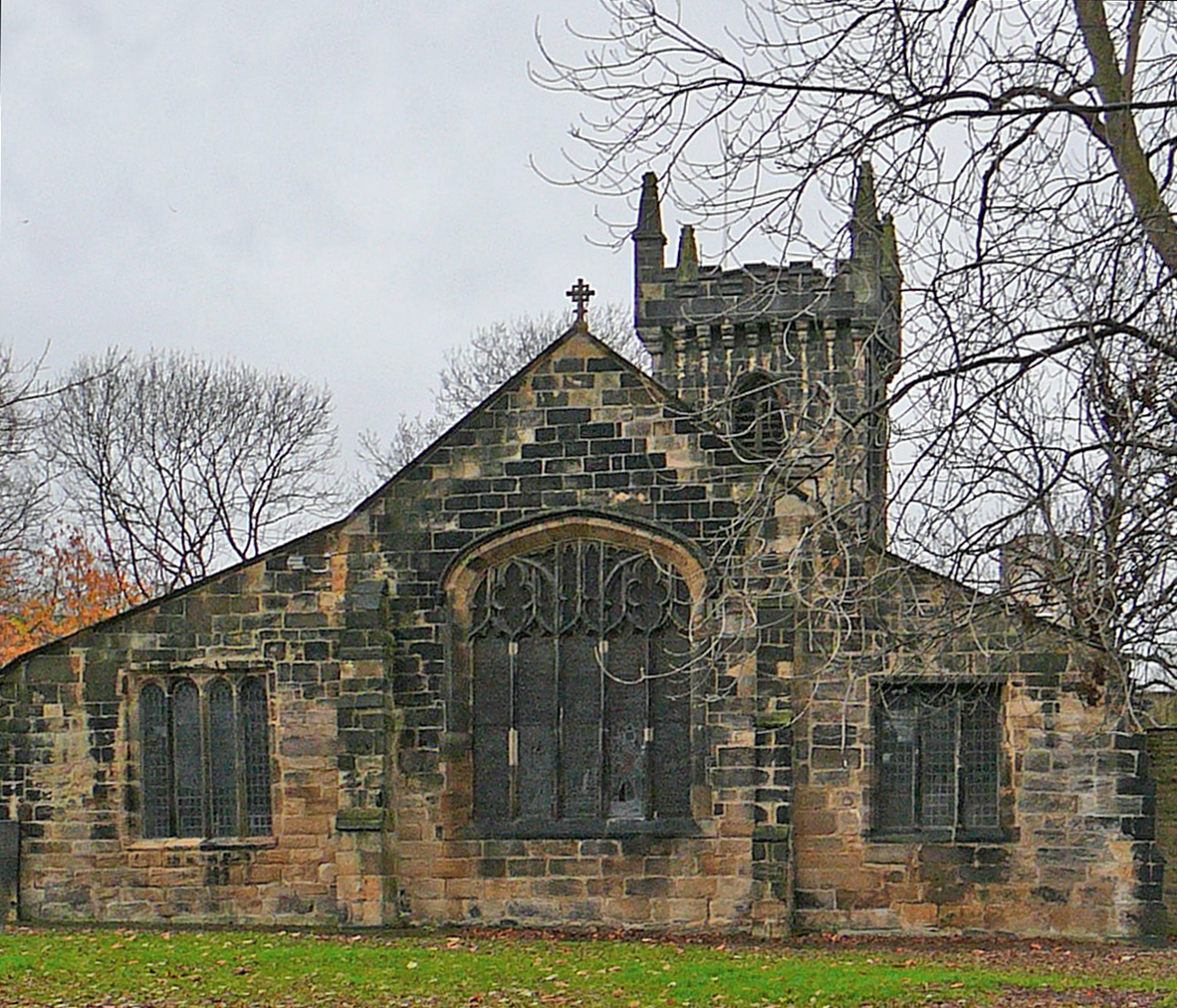
The church of All Saints

In the 2024 general election, Labour lost the new Dewsbury and Batley constituency to Iqbal Mohamed, who was one of four independent candidates who won seats in heavily Muslim areas largely due to Labour's stance on the Gaza war.

== Demography ==
Places of worship
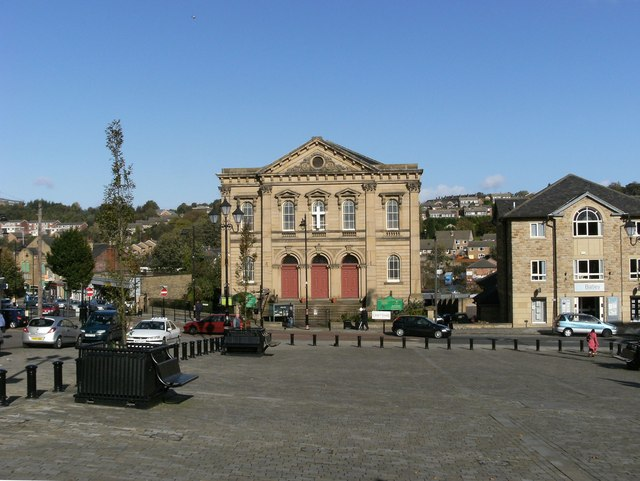
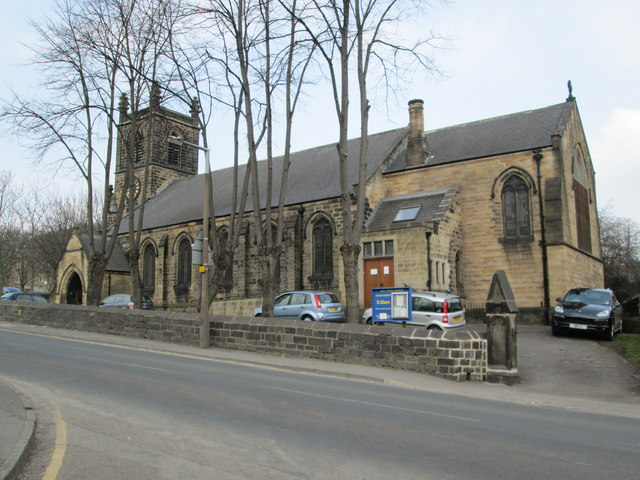
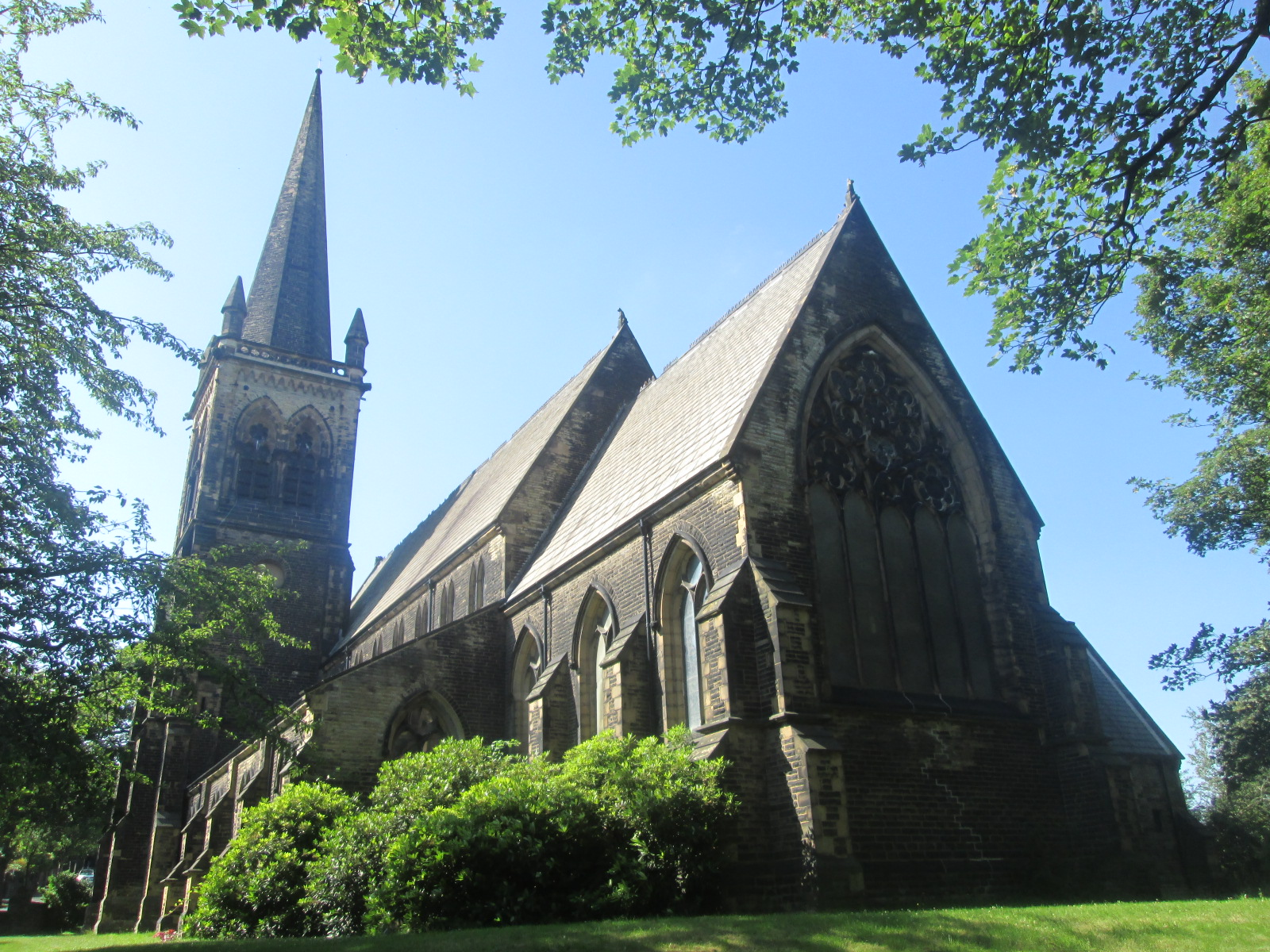

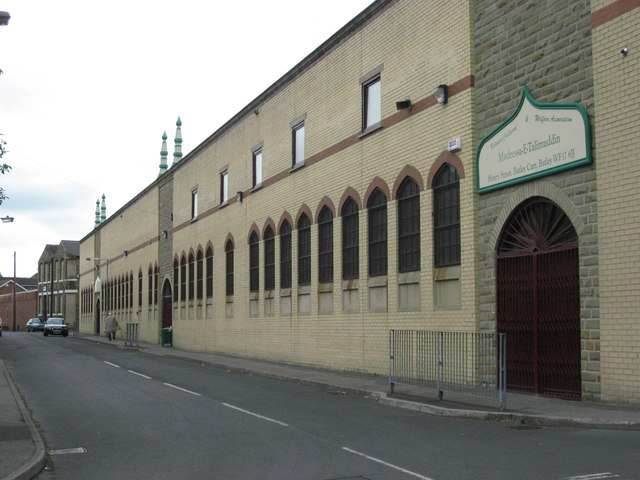
Medrassah and Mosque, Batley

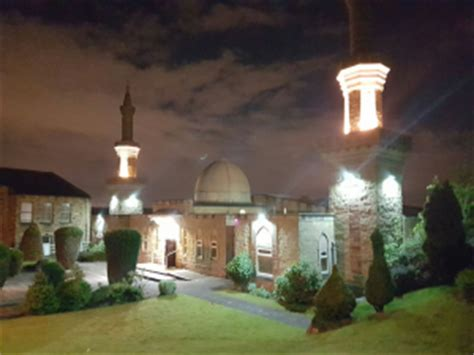
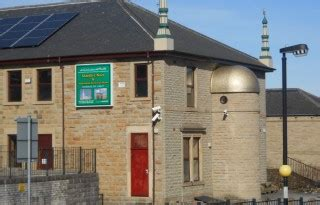
Batley Central Methodist Church, Holy Trinity Church, St Thomas Church, Madina Masjid and Masjud e Noor Mosque

From the end of the 1950s, the need for cheap labour in the town's textile industries drew in migrant labourers from Gujarat, Punjab, Pakistan and India. The South Asian population of Batley is now around 33% in Batley West and 54% in Batley East.

== Geography ==
Batley includes the districts of Batley Carr, Carlinghow, Cross Bank, Hanging Heaton, Healey, Lamplands, Carlton Grange Mount Pleasant, Soothill, Staincliffe, Upper Batley and White Lee.

As Batley shares boundaries with both Dewsbury and Heckmondwike, parts of Batley Carr, Hanging Heaton and Staincliffe are part of Dewsbury, while part of White Lee is in Heckmondwike. There is an area of Ossett known as Healey, which is identical in name to the Batley district of Healey; the Ossett area is sometimes referred to as "Healey Mills" due to the very large congregation of mills that once existed in that area.

== Transport ==
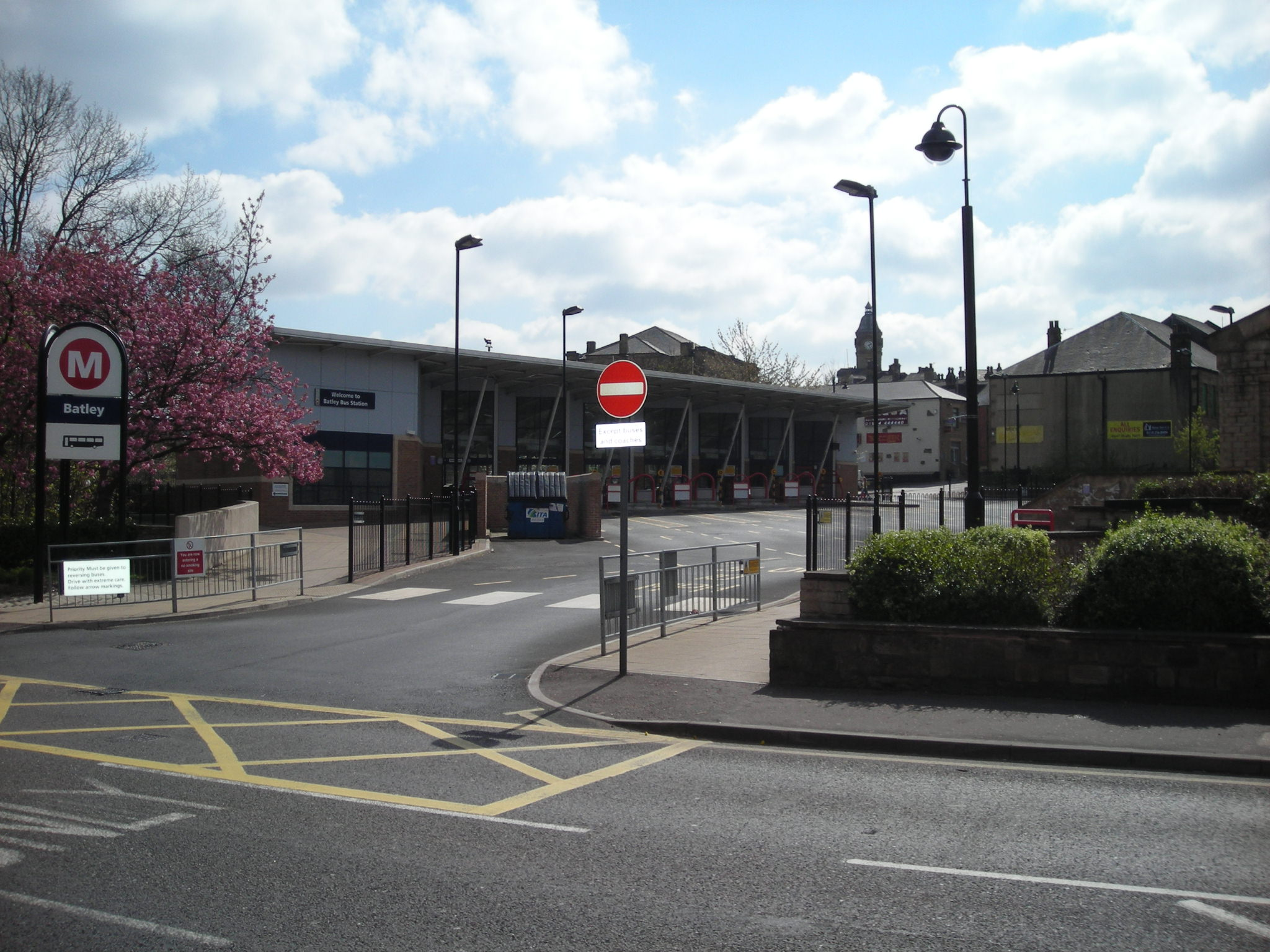
Batley bus station

Batley bus station serves the town and is owned and maintained by West Yorkshire Metro. It is situated in Batley town centre and can be accessed from Bradford Road and St. James's Street. It was re-built by Metro in April 2005 replacing the previously owned Arriva Yorkshire site. There are six stands and a real-time information board at the bus station. Arriva Yorkshire is the main operator.

Batley railway station is on the Huddersfield line between Leeds and Manchester.

== Schools ==
Batley Grammar School was founded in 1612 by the Rev. William Lee and is still in existence.

=== Primary schools ===
- Batley Parish CE (VA) J, I and N School
- Birstall Primary Academy
- Carlinghow Princess Royal J, I and N School
- Field Lane J, I and N School
- Fieldhead Primary Academy
- Hanging Heaton CE (VC) J and I School
- Healey J, I and N School
- Hyrstmount Junior School
- Lydgate J and I School (Soothill)
- Manorfield I and N School
- Mill Lane Primary School (Hanging Heaton)
- Park Road J.I and N School
- Purlwell I and N School
- St. Mary's Catholic Primary School, Batley
- St. Patrick's Catholic Primary School, Birstall
- Staincliffe CE (VC) Junior School
- Warwick Road J.I and N School
- Windmill Primary School

=== Secondary schools ===
- Batley Girls' High School, formerly a Visual Arts College
- Cambridge Street School, Muslim Boys School
- Batley Grammar School, founded in 1612
- Upper Batley High School, formerly known as Batley High School for Boys, founded in 1959

=== PRU ===
- Engage Academy

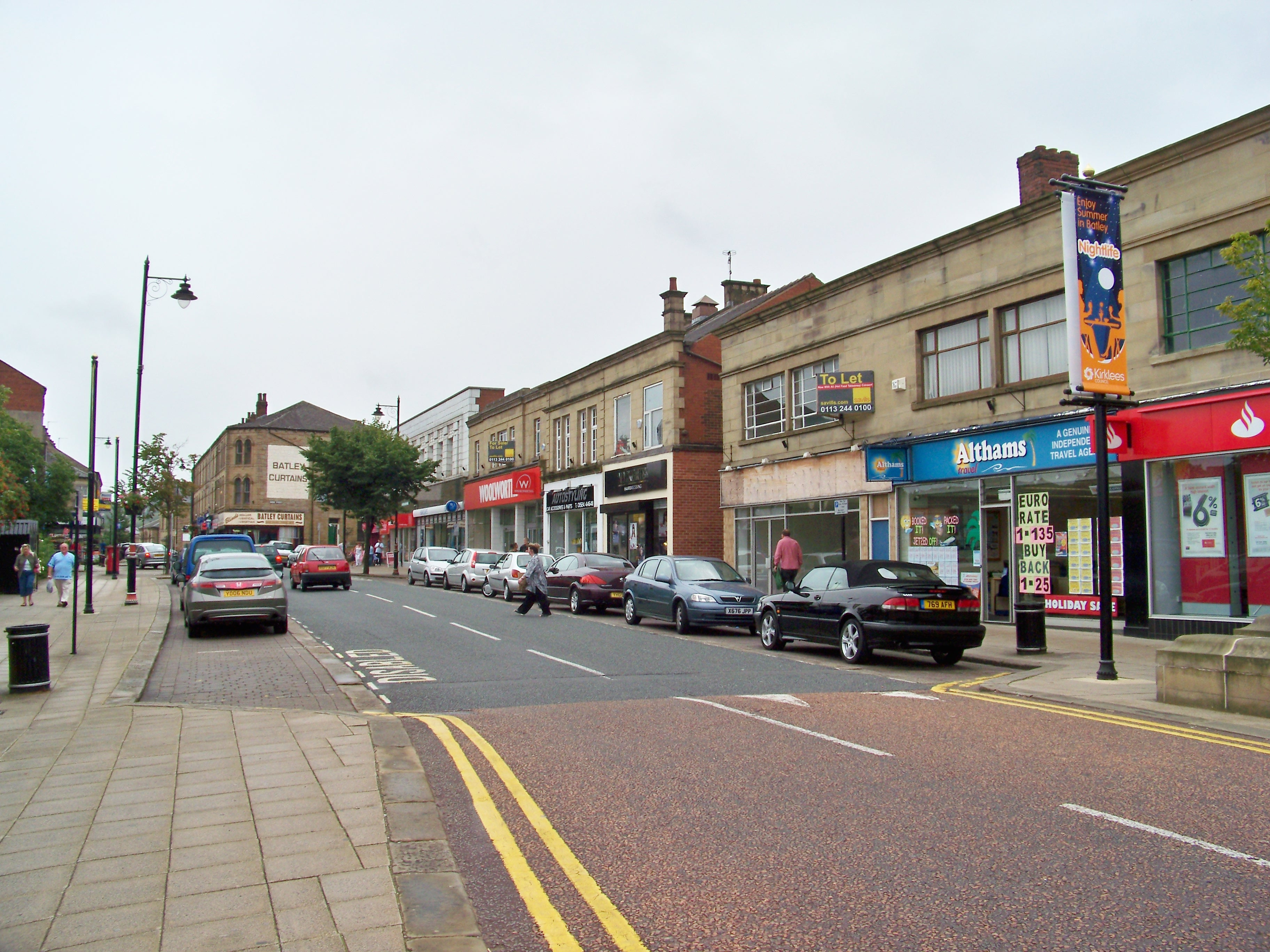
Commercial Street

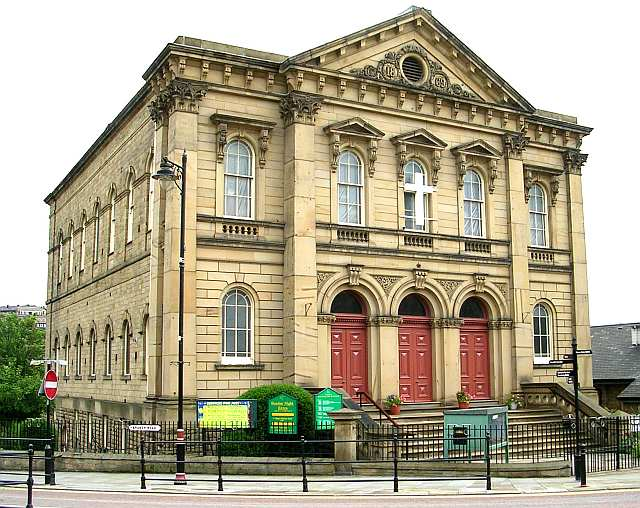
Commercial Street, Zion Chapel

== Landmarks ==
Landmarks around Batley include Oakwell Hall, Bagshaw Museum, Wilton Park, Mount Pleasant stadium, and All Saints Church, a Grade I listed building.

== Sport ==
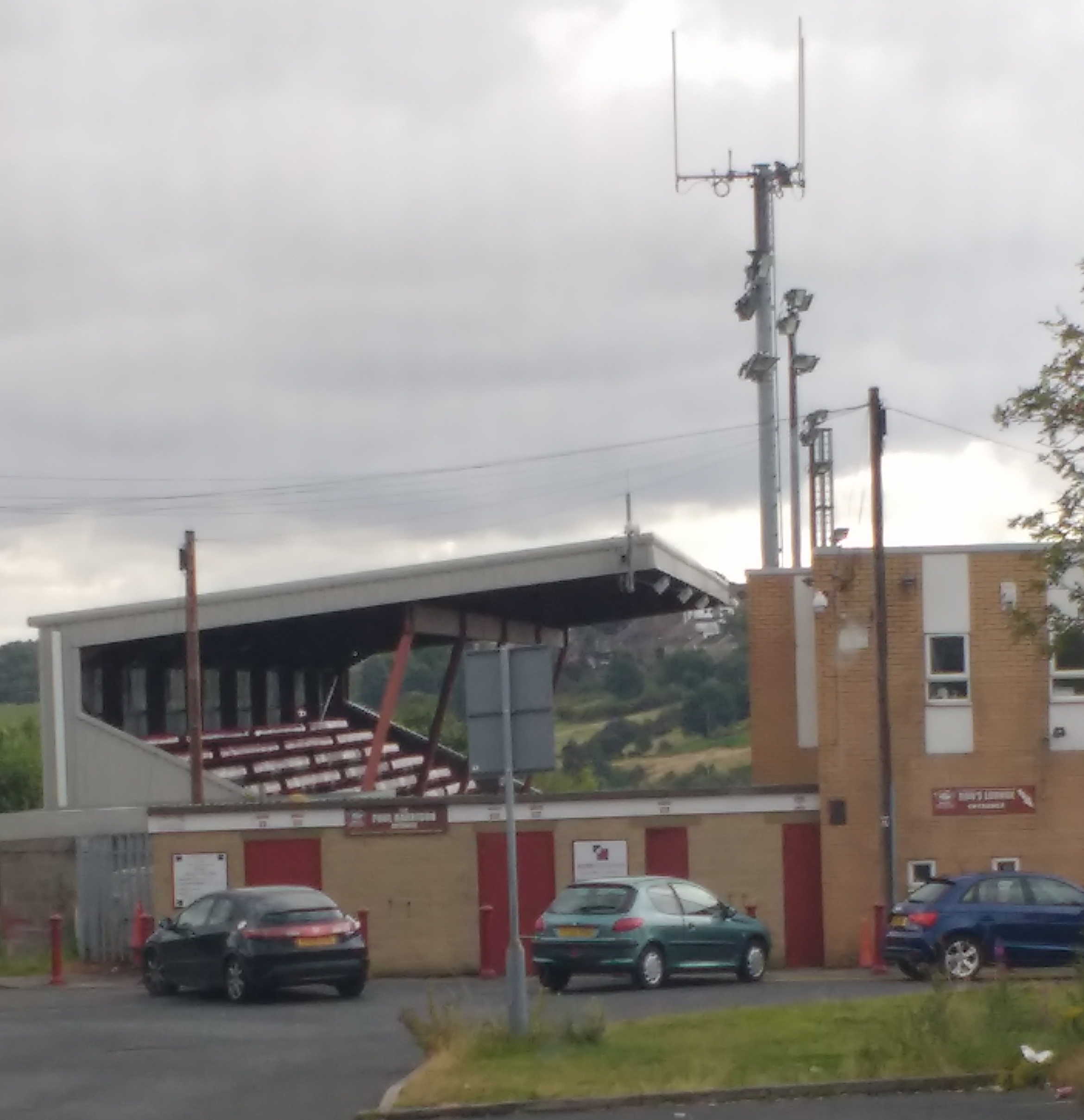
Batley Bulldogs' Mount Pleasant in 2016

The town is home to the professional rugby league club Batley RLFC and junior football club Batley Juniors F.C. (formerly Carlinghow Boys F.C.) Carlinghow is also located in Batley.

In cricket, Batley has several local teams, and is also part of the cricket association for the Heavy Woollen District. The original definition of the latter area was to within a 6 miles (9.7 km) radius of Batley Town Hall. The Heavy Woollen Cup can now be entered by any team within 18 miles (29 km) of Batley, but there is an upper limit of 64 teams.

The Mount Cricket Club play at Staincliffe and currently in the Halifax Cricket League.

== Culture ==
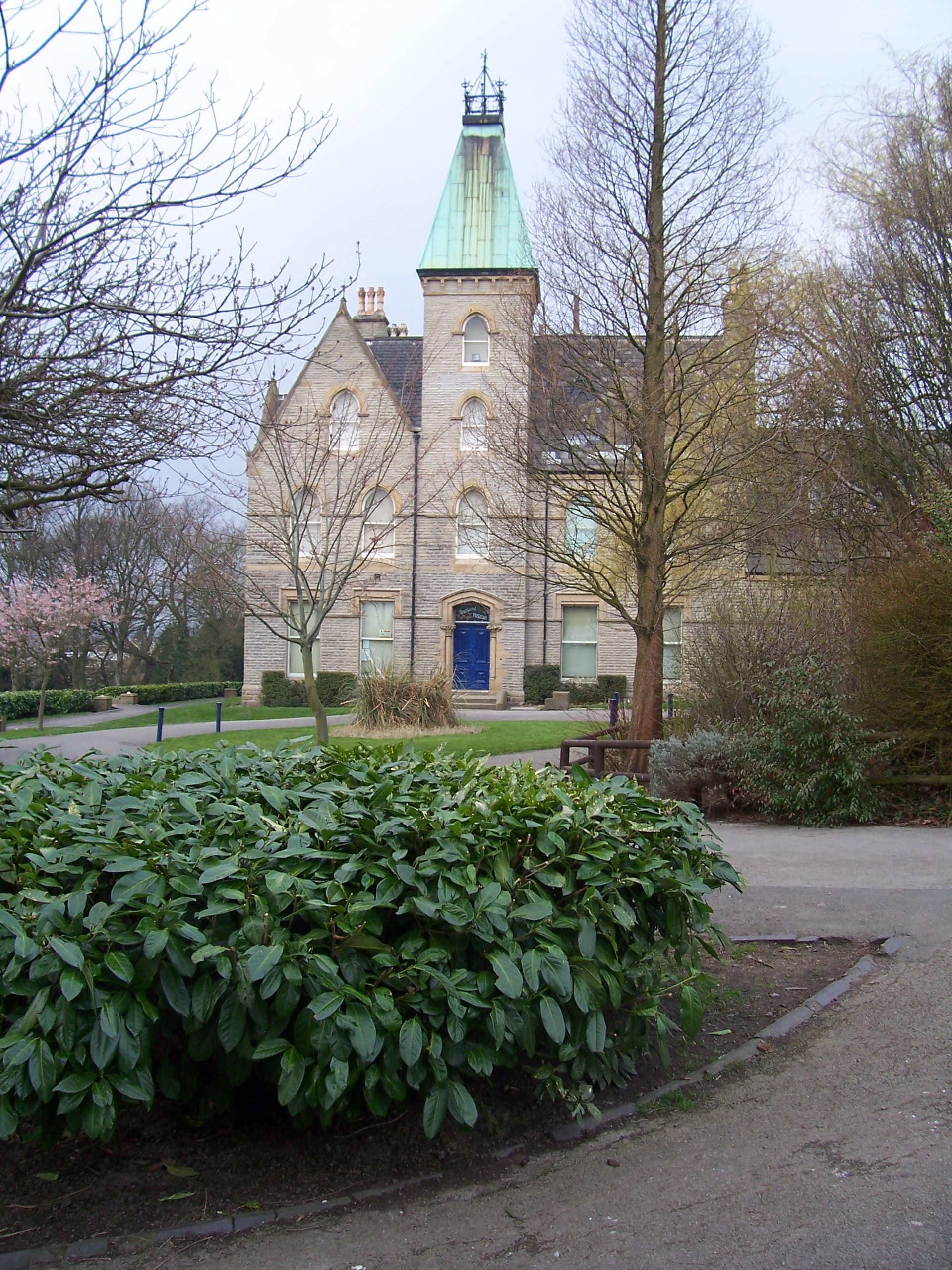
Bagshaw Museum, with its distinctive copper tower, was originally the home of the Sheard family

Wilton Park (Batley Park) is a large park between the town centre and Birstall. In its grounds are the Milner K. Ford Observatory (built in 1966 and home to the Batley & Spenborough Astronomical Society) and Bagshaw Museum. The museum is located in a house built by the "shoddy baron", George Sheard, and features local history, natural history, curios from around the world, and an Ancient Egyptian exhibition. The museum (originally the Wilton Park Museum) is named after its first curator Walter Bagshaw, a Batley councillor and extensive traveller.

The Yorkshire Motor Museum had a small but varied collection of cars dating back to 1885, and reflecting local car makers as well as more famous marques. The museum closed in 2010.

Batley Art Gallery, in the Batley Library building, features contemporary art, craft and photography.

Between 1966 and 1977 the Batley Variety Club was frequented by many notable acts including Louis Armstrong, Johnny Mathis, Eartha Kitt, the Bee Gees, Roy Orbison, the Hollies and Cliff Richard among others. For a brief period it was named Crumpets, after which it was closed for four years surviving numerous applications to have the building demolished. The club was then known as the Frontier nightclub from the late 1970s onwards. The Frontier was sold to businessmen in April 2005 and continued to operate as a nightclub whilst hosting variety shows and sporting events such as boxing, snooker and darts. The Frontier closed its doors for the final time in 2016 and following a £2 million refurbishment was successfully transformed into JD gym.

A dramatic society was founded in October 1913 at Shelton's café at 53 Commercial Street to present dramatic works to raise funds for Batley and District Hospital. On 8 January 1914 at a meeting in the Temperance Hall, it was decided that it would be known as the “Batley Amateur Thespian Society” and it became affiliated with the National Operatic and Dramatic Association.

== Media ==
Local news and television programmes are provided by BBC Yorkshire and ITV Yorkshire. Television signals are received from the Emley Moor transmitter and the local relay transmitter situated in the town centre.

Local radio stations are BBC Radio Leeds, Heart Yorkshire, Capital Yorkshire, Hits Radio West Yorkshire, Greatest Hits Radio West Yorkshire, and Rhubarb Radio, a community based station that broadcast from Wakefield.

The town is served by the local newspaper, Dewsbury Reporter.

== In popular culture ==
Batley was used for location filming of the fictional town of Barfield in the 1955 film Value for Money, starring John Gregson and Diana Dors. Monty Python's Flying Circus had a series of recurring sketches in which the members of the Batley Ladies Townswomen's Guild would present famous plays or musicals, or re-enact various historical battles (such as the Battle of Pearl Harbor), by charging at each other, swinging handbags and wrestling in the mud.

== Notable people ==
The following people are or were from Batley:

- Joseph Priestley (1733–1804), chemist, theologian, educator, and political theorist credited with the discovery of oxygen – born in Birstall and educated at Batley Grammar School.
- William Henry Colbeck (1823–1901), New Zealand politician – born in Batley.
- Titus Sheard (1841–1904), American businessman and politician – born in Batley.
- Theodore Taylor (1850–1952), businessman and politician known for his pioneering profit-sharing scheme at J. T. & J. Taylor – born in Carlinghow.
- Louis Hall (1852–1915), cricketer for Yorkshire County Cricket Club – born in Batley where he served as a councillor and Methodist lay preacher.
- Joseph Cookman (1899–1944), American journalist – born in Batley.
- Hugh Garner (1913–1979), Canadian novelist – born in Batley.
- Robert G. Edwards (1925–2013), physiologist who received a Nobel Prize for the development of in-vitro fertilisation (IVF) – born in Batley.
- Leslie V. Woodcock (born 1945), professor of chemical thermodynamics at the University of Manchester
- Robert Palmer (1949–2003), pop singer famous for the 1986 hit, "Addicted to Love" – born in Batley.
- Arthur Roche (born 1950), archbishop who served as the ninth Bishop of Leeds before being appointed Secretary of the Congregation for Divine Worship and the Discipline of the Sacraments by Pope Benedict XVI in 2012 – born in Batley Carr.
- Larry Hirst (born 1951), chairman of IBM Europe, Middle East and Africa between 2008 and 2010 – born in Batley.
- Tracy Brabin (born 1961), politician and first Mayor of West Yorkshire – born in Batley, served as Labour MP for Batley & Spen from 2016 to 2021.
- Mark Eastwood (born 1971), politician and Conservative MP for Dewsbury since 2019 – grew up in Carlinghow and educated at Batley Boys High School.
- Jo Cox (1974–2016), politician – born in Batley, served as Labour MP for Batley & Spen from 2015 until her murder in Birstall in 2016.
- Kim Leadbeater (born 1976), politician – born in Batley, has served as Labour MP for Batley & Spen since 2021.
- Ismail Patel (born 1985), runner – born in Batley, has taken part in over 35 10k races despite his family being told he would not wake up from a coma.

== See also ==
- Listed buildings in Batley
