= All Saints' Church, Batley =

Anglican church in Batley, West Yorkshire, England

All Saints' Church
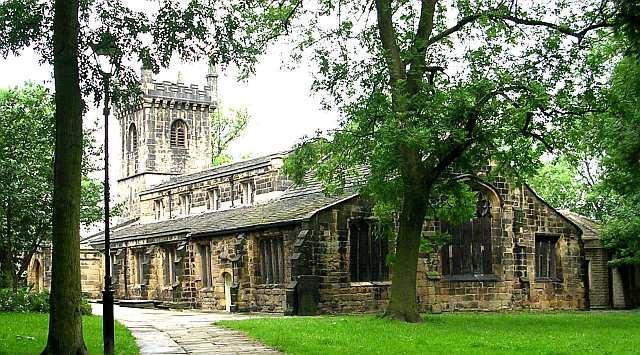
- All Saints' Church
- 53.715889°N 1.636198°W
- OS grid reference: SE 24130 24457
- Location: Stocks Lane, Batley, Kirklees, West Yorkshire
- Country: England
- Denomination: Anglican
- Website: www.batleyparishchurch.org.uk

History
- Status: Parish church

Architecture
- Functional status: Active
- Heritage designation: Grade I
- Designated: 29 March 1963
- Style: Decorated; Perpendicular
- Completed: c. 1485

Administration
- Province: York
- Diocese: Leeds
- Archdeaconry: Pontefract
- Deanery: Dewsbury
- Parish: Batley

All Saints' Church is the parish church of the town of Batley, Kirklees, West Yorkshire, England. It dates to the 15th century, was restored in the 19th century and is a Grade I listed building.

== History ==
There was a church at Batley when the Domesday Book was compiled in 1086. Parish records since 1559 are extant.

Adam de Oxenhope de Copley had a chantry chapel added to the south side of the church in 1334. The present building was completed around 1485, but incorporates elements from the 14th-century church. The interior was restored in 1872–73 by Walter Hanstock, who designed churches in Batley and Leeds. A vestry was subsequently added, and replaced in the 1960s. The first organ was installed in the chantry chapel in 1830; the present organ dates to 1965. The church was Grade I listed on 29 March 1963.

== Church ==
The church is stone, with Decorated features including the south arcade. It has a porch on the south side, a nave with clerestory and north and south aisles, and a Perpendicular west tower with tall corner pinnacles and a corbelled-out battlemented parapet that is characteristic of the Leeds area. The east window is Perpendicular. There is a Lady chapel on the south and on the north a chapel dedicated to St Anne with the late-15th century tomb of Sir William and Lady Anne Mirfield, with alabaster effigies. The vestry on the north side dates to the mid-1960s.

A recumbent effigy in the churchyard east of the porch was Grade II listed on 13 January 1984.

== See also ==
- Grade I listed buildings in West Yorkshire
- Listed buildings in Batley
