= Batley Town Hall =

Municipal building in Batley, West Yorkshire, England

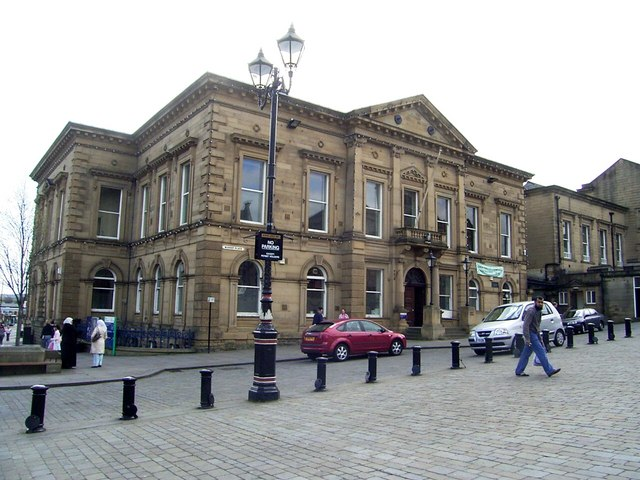
- Batley Town Hall

- Shown in West Yorkshire
- 53.7141°N 1.6332°W
- Location: Batley

History
- Built: 1854

Site notes
- Architectural style: Neoclassical style

Listed Building – Grade II
- Designated: 13 January 1984
- Reference no.: 1300324

Batley Town Hall is a municipal facility in the Market Place in Batley, West Yorkshire, England. It is a Grade II listed building.

== History ==
The building, which was designed in the neoclassical style, was paid for by public subscription and opened as the local mechanics' institute in 1854. The design involved a symmetrical main frontage with seven bays facing onto the Market Place; the central section of three bays, which slightly projected forward, featured a round-headed doorway with a fanlight flanked by engaged Ionic order columns; there was a balcony together with a projecting flagpole and three square-headed sash windows flanked by Ionic order pilasters on the first floor and there was a large pediment at roof level. The building incorporated a public library and, like other mechanics institutes, it provided adult education, particularly in technical subjects, for working men. Its activities led to the formation of the Batley Choral Society which continued to deliver performances into the early 20th century.

After Batley was incorporated as a municipal borough in December 1868, the borough council initially met in a room on the first floor of the Wilton Arms Hotel in Commercial Street. However, after finding this arrangement inadequate, civic leaders chose to lease and then acquire the former mechanics institute, which was only 350 yards (320 m) away, as their new headquarters from 1874.

In the 19th century the town hall defined the competition area for local sporting activities. The Heavy Woollen District Junior Cricket League Trophy was first competed for in 1883: competing teams, which came from the woollen mills and Sunday schools of the local area, were initially required to be located within a six-mile radius of the town hall: this requirement was subsequently relaxed and extended to an eighteen-mile radius of the building.

After the town hall was badly damaged in a fire in September 1902, civic leaders initially considered a proposal to build a completely new structure but eventually decided to refurbish the existing building; the local firm of Walter Hanstock & Son, which duly carried out the works, was also responsible for an extension to the rear which included a council chamber, a mayor's parlour and council offices which opened in July 1905. The town hall continued to serve as the headquarters of Batley Borough Council but it ceased to be the local seat of government on the formation of the enlarged Metropolitan Borough of Kirklees in 1974. The assembly hall on the first floor of the building continued to be used by the local community for concerts and theatrical productions. A blue plaque commemorating the history of the building was unveiled by the Batley History Group in September 2019.

== See also ==
- Listed buildings in Batley
