= Soothill =

Village in West Yorkshire, England

Coordinates: 53.713°N 1.617°W

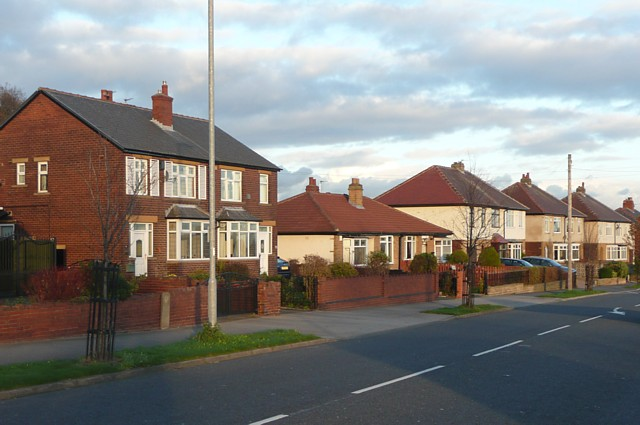
- Houses along Soothill Lane

- Location within West Yorkshire
- Metropolitan borough: Kirklees
- Metropolitan county: West Yorkshire
- Region: Yorkshire and the Humber
- Country: England
- Sovereign state: United Kingdom
- Police: West Yorkshire
- Fire: West Yorkshire
- Ambulance: Yorkshire

Soothill is a small village in the town of Batley, in the Kirklees district, in the county of West Yorkshire, England. Soothill is 1.5 miles (2.4 km) northeast from the town of Dewsbury and directly north of Hanging Heaton.

== History ==
The name derives from the Old English "sot" and means a place where wood was burnt.

Soothill was formerly a township in the parish of Dewsbury, in 1866 Soothill became a separate civil parish, in 1894 the parish was abolished and split to form Soothill Nether and Soothill Upper. In 1891 the parish had a population of 11,493.

Soothill was on the Great Northern Railway's Leeds to Batley branch line, although no station was provided. The colliery at Soothill, adjacent to the railway, was the scene of a rail accident in February 1920 between a goods train and a passenger train. The accident was not fatal with only injuries being recorded. The railway was closed in 1953 leaving a disused tunnel (Soothill Tunnel) north east of the settlement. This tunnel has been bricked up as it contains toxic gases.
