= Staincliffe =

District in West Yorkshire, England

Coordinates: 53.705°N 1.647°W

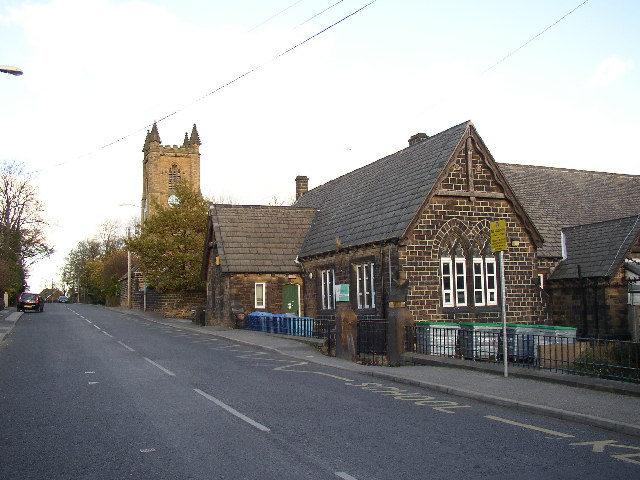
- Staincliffe Hall Road

- Location within West Yorkshire
- Metropolitan borough: Kirklees
- Metropolitan county: West Yorkshire
- Region: Yorkshire and the Humber
- Country: England
- Sovereign state: United Kingdom
- Post town: DEWSBURY
- Postcode district: WF13
- Post town: BATLEY
- Postcode district: WF17
- Dialling code: 01924
- Police: West Yorkshire
- Fire: West Yorkshire
- Ambulance: Yorkshire
- UK Parliament: Spen Valley

Staincliffe is a cross-over district of both Batley and Dewsbury, in West Yorkshire, England. Historically part of the West Riding of Yorkshire, the name is believed to derive from staine, meaning stone and cliffe, cliff.

The area is centred on top of a hill between Dewsbury, Batley and Heckmondwike, north and east of Halifax Road (A638 road) are in Batley (WF17). The section south of Halifax Road, including Dewsbury & District Hospital has a Dewsbury (WF13) postal addresses.

Until the 19th century, the hamlet of Staincliffe consisted of Staincliffe Hall (dating from at least the 17th century) a few farms and some 18th-century cottages, many of which survive amongst the later developments. Staincliffe expanded in the 19th century with the growth of the heavy woollen industry. In 1867, a new parish church of Christ Church Staincliffe was consecrated which, along with the vicarage and church school, was designed by William Henry Crossland.

Today Staincliffe has many 19th-century houses, but also contains a couple of council housing estates built during the 1950s, as well as a mix of small shops along Halifax Road.

== See also ==
- Listed buildings in Batley
