= Upper Batley High School =

Location
- Blenheim Drive; Batley Field Hill; Batley; West Yorkshire, WF17 0BJ; England; 53.7207°N 1.6354°W

Information
- Type: Academy
- Established: 9 September 1959
- Founder: West Riding County Council
- Local authority: Kirklees
- Department for Education URN: 142406 Tables
- Ofsted: Reports
- Headteacher: Samantha Vickers
- Gender: Boys
- Age: 11 to 16
- Website: http://www.ubhs.co.uk/

Upper Batley High School is a secondary school for boys located in Batley, West Yorkshire, England.

It was established by West Riding County Council in 1959 as Batley Boys High School. The school gained specialist status as a Business and Enterprise College in the 2000s and was renamed Batley Business and Enterprise College. The school was renamed Upper Batley High School in September 2015 and converted to academy status in April 2016.

== Notable former pupils ==
- Mark Eastwood, Conservative MP for Dewsbury
- Carl Gibson, former professional rugby league footballer
- Roy Powell, rugby league player 1965-98
- Robert Palmer, singer/songwriter, best known for the top 10 hit "Addicted to love"
