= Wilton Park, Batley =

Public park in West Yorkshire, England

Wilton Park
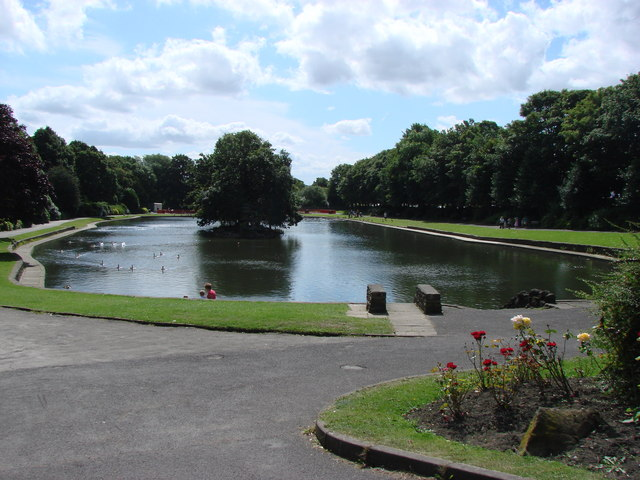
- Wilton Park Lake
- Interactive map of Wilton Park
- Type: public
- Location: Batley, West Yorkshire
- Nearest city: Leeds
- Coordinates: 53°43′36″N 1°38′56″W
- Created: 1909
- Operator: Kirklees Metropolitan Council

Wilton Park is a public park located in Batley, West Yorkshire, England.

Opened to the public in 1909 in the grounds of an old mansion (which now serves as the Bagshaw Museum) by the Batley Corporation, the park now serves the whole of the town.

The park contains a lake, formal gardens, a large area of natural woodland and open fields. Facilities include bowling greens, tennis courts and a paddling pool. A railway line once ran through the park. Despite being closed many years ago, its path is still evident, as is the bridge which lies directly in front of the park's main entrance.
