= Hanging Heaton =

Village in West Yorkshire, England

Coordinates: 53.704°N 1.615°W

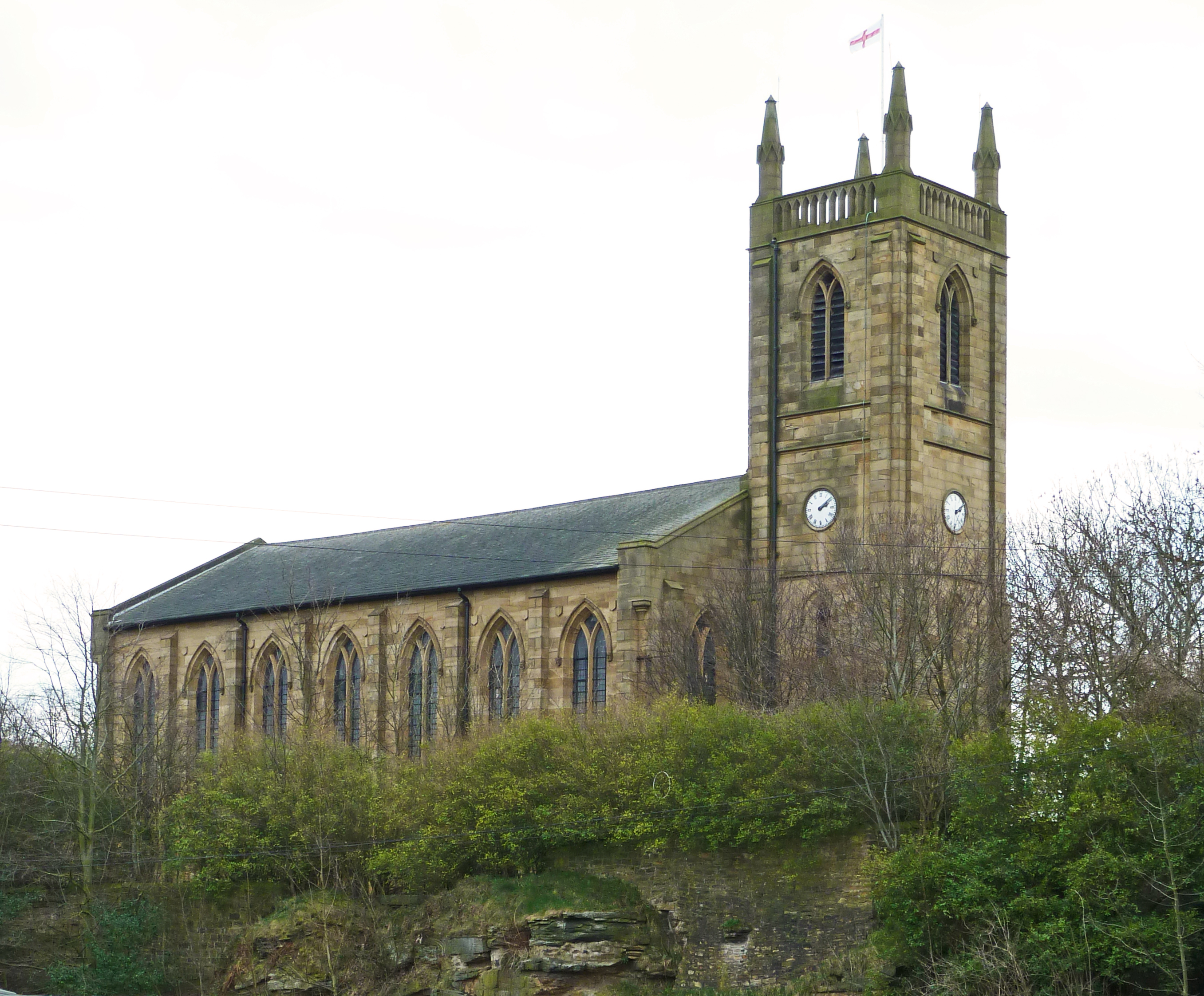
St Paul's Church in Hanging Heaton

Hanging Heaton is a village in West Yorkshire, England. Partly in both Batley and Dewsbury, it is an historic village mentioned in the Domesday Book under the name 'Etun'. The prefix 'Hanging' refers to a steep hillside hanging above lower ground, while 'Heaton' means 'High Farm', meaning the village was once a hillside farmstead.

With housing dating from the 16th century to the present day, it is a varied community with a successful cricket club, golf club, two churches, a pub and a community group. Hanging Heaton is also home to both Hanging Heaton CE (VC) J & I School and Mill Lane J I & EY School.

Hanging Heaton was the birthplace of physiologist Robert Edwards, who was the pioneer of in vitro fertilisation (IVF).

== See also ==
- Listed buildings in Dewsbury
