= Bagshaw Museum =

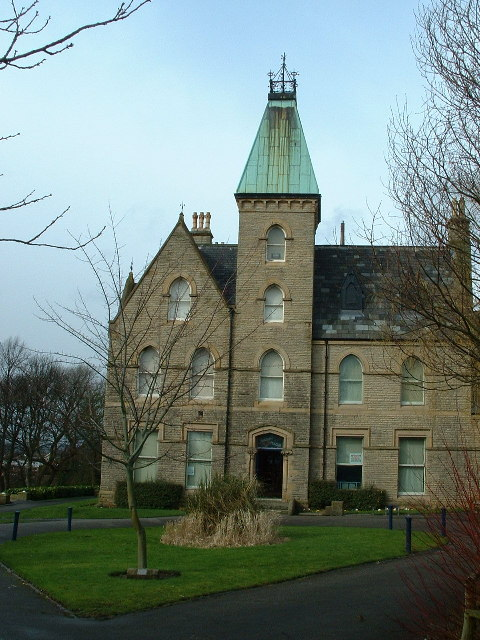
- Exterior of the museum

- Location within West Yorkshire
- Former name: Wilton Park Museum
- Established: 1911
- Location: Batley, West Yorkshire
- Coordinates: 53.727891°N 1.645363°W
- Type: Local museum
- Key holdings: Replica mummy; Figure Study II (Francis Bacon)
- Founder: Walter Bagshaw
- Owner: Kirklees Council
- Parking: On site (no charge)
- Website: www.kirklees.gov.uk/bagshawmuseum

Bagshaw Museum is a local museum in the town of Batley, West Yorkshire. Situated in Wilton Park, the elaborate Gothic Revival mansion was converted into a museum by Walter Bagshaw in 1911. Originally called the Wilton Park Museum, it was renamed after Bagshaw following his death in 1927.

Bagshaw's initial collection was expanded with subsequent donations from Violet Bagshaw and orientalist John Hilditch, and today comprises an eclectic set of antiquities and ethnographic objects. Unusually for a local museum, it has a dedicated Egyptology gallery, including a replica mummy reconstructed from an authentic Egyptian death mask. It also holds a substantial collection of Asian textiles, reflecting Batley's historical ties to the textile industry and significant South Asian community. A Francis Bacon painting (Figure Study II), today valued at between £19.5 million and £60 million, was donated to the museum in the 1950s, but was transferred to Huddersfield Art Gallery in the 1970s.

The museum is currently owned and operated by Kirklees Council, but owing to local government budget cuts, its future is uncertain.

== History ==
The museum building was originally a mansion called 'The Woodlands', built by mill owner George Sheard in 1875. When Sheard died in 1902, no buyer could be found for the elaborate Gothic revival structure—originally costing £25,000 (equivalent to £2,494,090 in 2025)—and so it was acquired by the local authority for a nominal price of £5. It was converted into a museum by Walter Bagshaw in 1911. Originally called the Wilton Park Museum, it was renamed in honour of its first curator following Bagshaw's death in 1927.

The museum was founded using Bagshaw's own private collection. After his death, his daughter Violet Bagshaw continued to travel and acquire objects to donate to the museum. The museum's holdings were significantly expanded in 1929, when it acquired 170 pieces from the collection of John Hilditch, a well known orientalist. Hilditch displayed a large part of his collection in a travelling exhibition, and his will bequeathed it to wherever the exhibition was when he died. In the event, this happened to be the Bagshaw Museum.

A portion of the museum's collection was stolen in 1997.

In early 2016, it was reported that Kirklees Council was considering closing the museum to meet budget cuts. As of 2017, it remains open, with the nearby Dewsbury Museum and Red House Museum closing instead. However, according to the Museums Association, Bagshaw's future remains "uncertain".

== Collections ==
The museum contains two local history galleries, a South Asia gallery, a temporary exhibition space, and, unusually for a local museum, an Egyptological gallery.

The centrepiece of the Egyptological display is a full size replica mummy, created by curator John Lidster in 1969, using a genuinely historic death mask, bandages and ground coffee. However the museum holds an eclectic collection of bona fide antiquities and ethnographic artefacts. These include a 7th century BCE Egyptian coffin inscribed with the name of its occupant in hieroglyphs; a carving of Sekhmet from the 26th Dynasty of Egypt; a wooden figurine of Han dynasty general Guan Yu; a carved coconut head from the South Pacific islands; a carving of the Hindu deity Garuda; a decorated box from British India; an Aboriginal Australian spear thrower; and a 19th century sword from Sudan.

The museum also holds a substantial collection of Asian textiles, including Japanese and Chinese pieces from the Hilditch collection, subsequent donations from private individuals, the Victoria and Albert Museum, and the Imperial Institute, and recent acquisitions from South Asia.

In the 1950s, the Contemporary Art Society donated a Francis Bacon painting (Figure Study II) to Bagshaw Museum, which now has an estimated value of between £19.5 million and £60 million. When ownership of the museum passed from Batley Borough Council to the amalgamated Kirklees Council in 1974, the painting was transferred to Huddersfield Art Gallery, where it is on permanent display when not on loan to other institutions. In 2016, it was reported that Kirklees Council were looking into selling the painting, which it considered "too valuable to be exhibited locally". They later conceded that the conditions of the Contemporary Art Society's donation meant that the work could not be sold.

== See also ==
- Listed buildings in Batley
