= Westborough High School =

Westborough High School may refer to:

- Westborough High School (Massachusetts), Westborough, Massachusetts
- Westborough High School, Dewsbury, West Yorkshire, England
