= Dewsbury =

Market town in West Yorkshire, England

Coordinates: 53.691°N 1.633°W

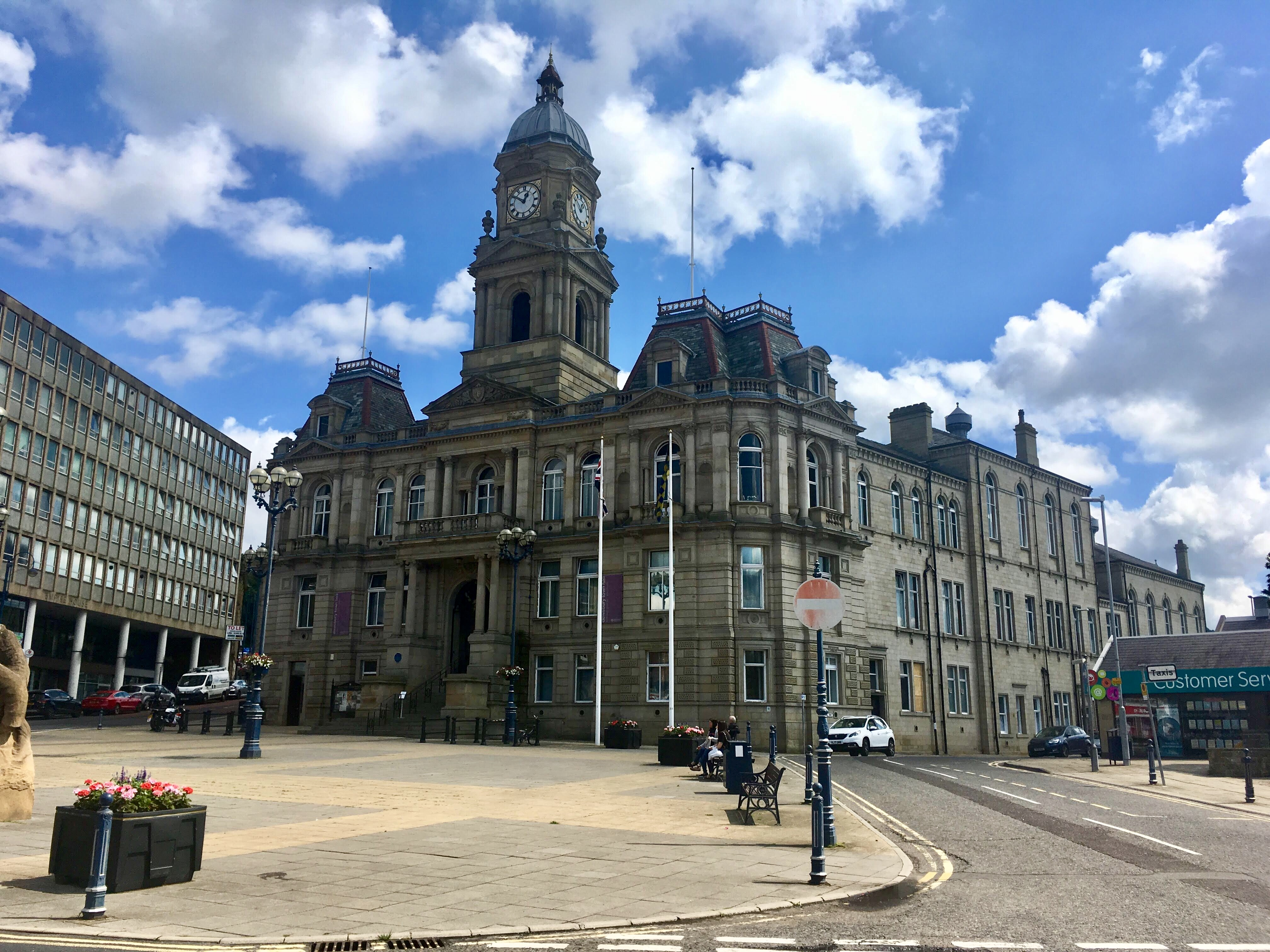
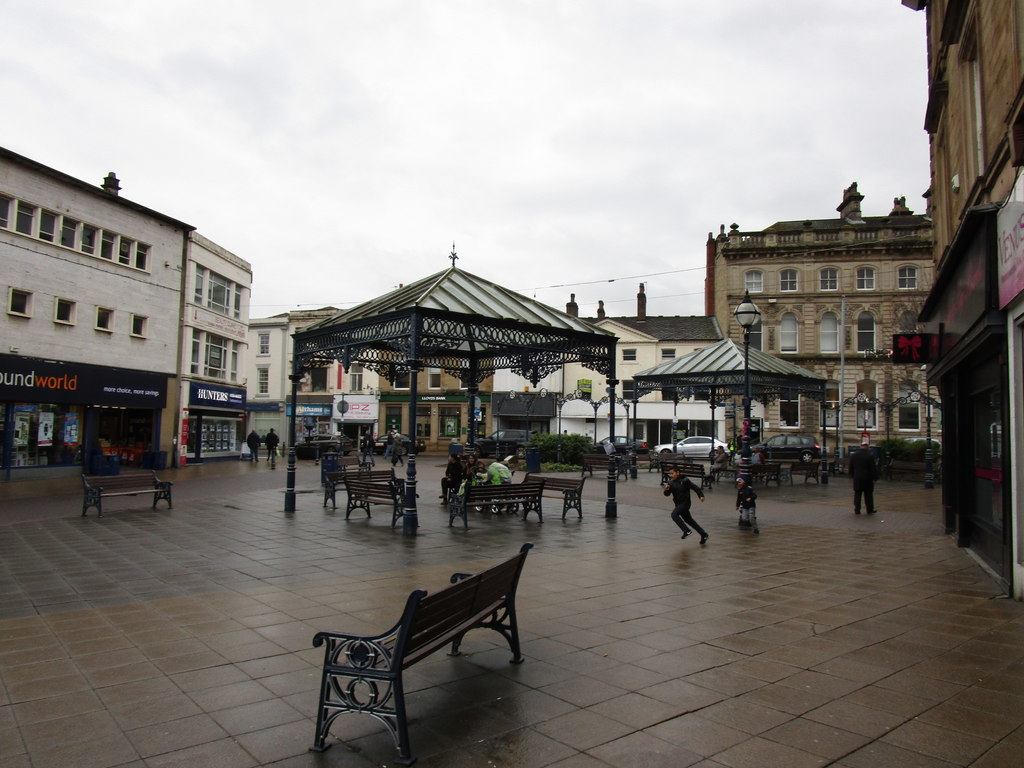
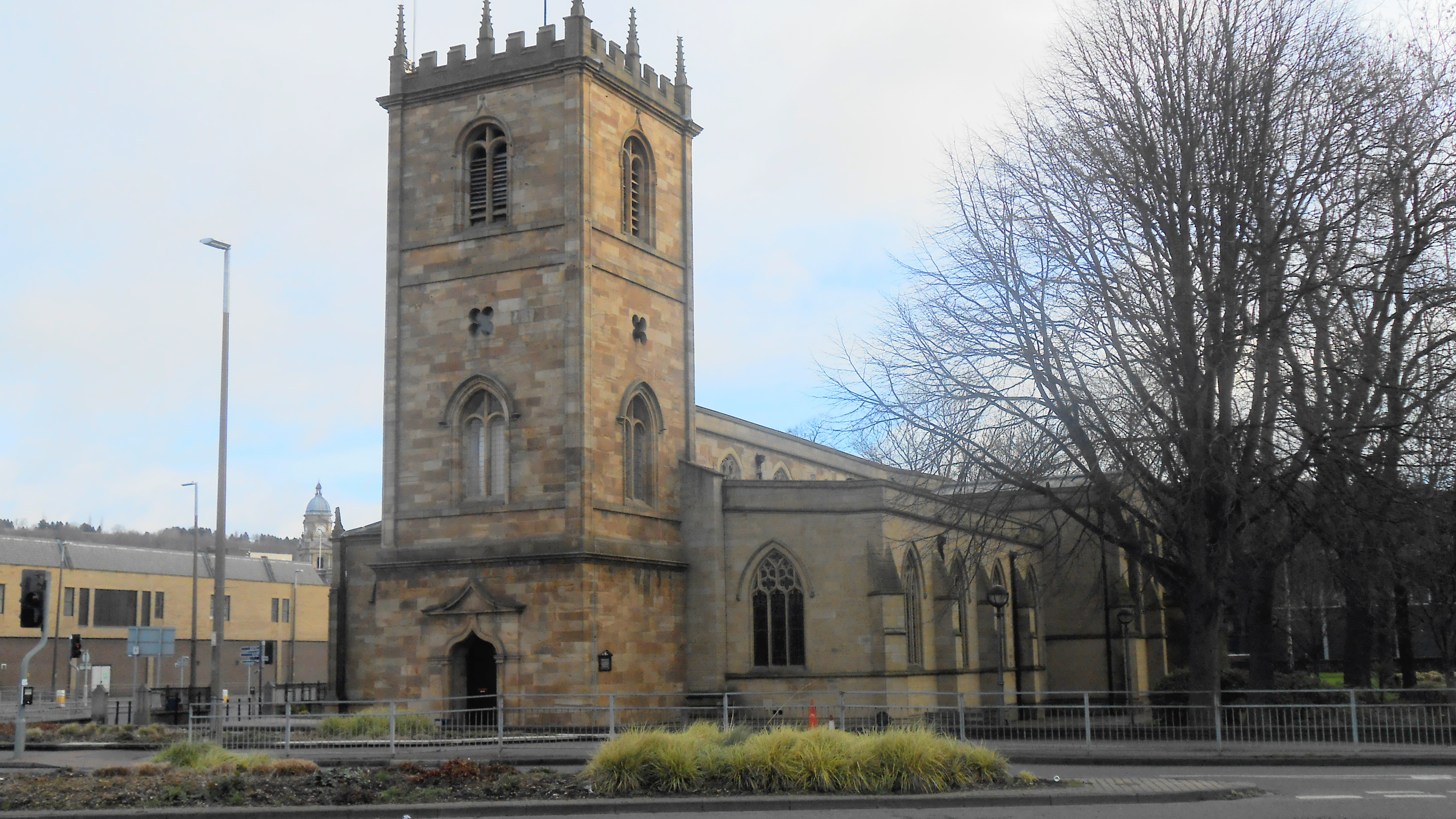
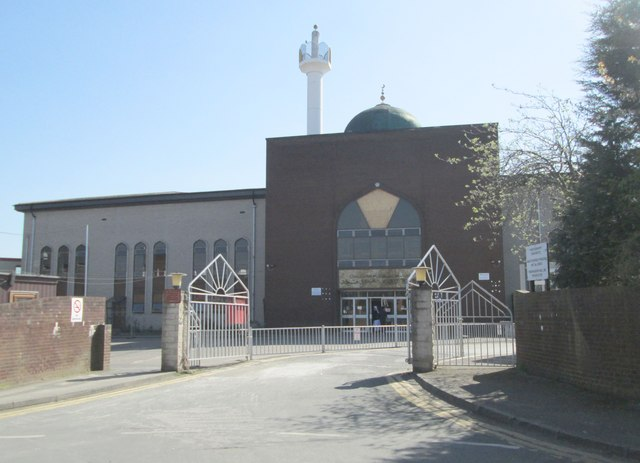
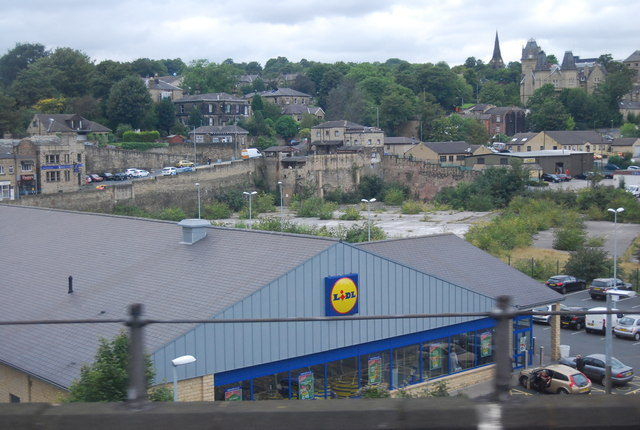
- Clockwise from top: Dewsbury Town Hall, Minster Church, Townscape, Markazi Masjid in Savile Town and Market Place

- Flag

- Location within West Yorkshire
- Population: 61,035 (Wards, 2021 Census)
- OS grid reference: SE245225
  - London: 188 mi (SE)
- Metropolitan borough: Kirklees
- Metropolitan county: West Yorkshire
- Region: Yorkshire and the Humber
- Country: England
- Sovereign state: United Kingdom
- Areas of the town: List: Boothroyd; Chickenley; Crackenedge; Dewsbury Moor; Earlsheaton; Eastborough; Flatts; Hanging Heaton (part); Overthorpe; Ravensthorpe (part); Savile Town; Thornhill; Thornhill Edge; Thornhill Lees; West Town
- Post town: DEWSBURY
- Postcode district: WF12-13
- Dialling code: 01924
- Police: West Yorkshire
- Fire: West Yorkshire
- Ambulance: Yorkshire
- UK Parliament: Dewsbury and Batley

Dewsbury is a market town in the Metropolitan Borough of Kirklees, West Yorkshire, England. It is sited on the River Calder and on an arm of the Calder and Hebble Navigation waterway. It lies to the west of Wakefield, east of Huddersfield and south of Leeds. Historically a part of the West Riding of Yorkshire, after undergoing a period of major growth in the 19th century as a mill town, Dewsbury went through a period of decline. It forms part of the Heavy Woollen District, of which it is the largest town. The population of the built-up area was 63,722 at the 2021 Census.

== History ==
=== Toponymy ===
The Domesday Book of 1086 records the name as Deusberie, Deusberia, Deusbereia, or Deubire, literally "Dewi's fort", Dewi being an old Welsh (native British) name (equivalent to David) and "bury" coming from the old English word "burh", meaning fort.

Other, less supported, theories exist as to the name's origin. For example, that it means "dew hill", from Old English dēaw (genitive dēawes), "dew", and beorg, "hill" (because Dewsbury is built on a hill). It has been suggested that dēaw refers to the town's proximity to the water of the River Calder.

In the past other origins were proposed, such as "God's fort", from Welsh Duw, "God". "Antiquarians supposed the name, Dewsbury, to be derived from the original planter of the village, Dui or Dew, who … had fixed his abode and fortified his "Bury". Another conjecture holds, that the original name is Dewsborough, or God's Town" (1837)

=== Early history ===
In Anglo-Saxon times, Dewsbury was a centre of considerable importance. The ecclesiastical parish of Dewsbury encompassed Huddersfield, Mirfield and Bradford. Ancient legend records that in 627 Paulinus, the Bishop of York, preached here on the banks of the River Calder. Numerous Anglian graves have been found in Dewsbury and Thornhill.

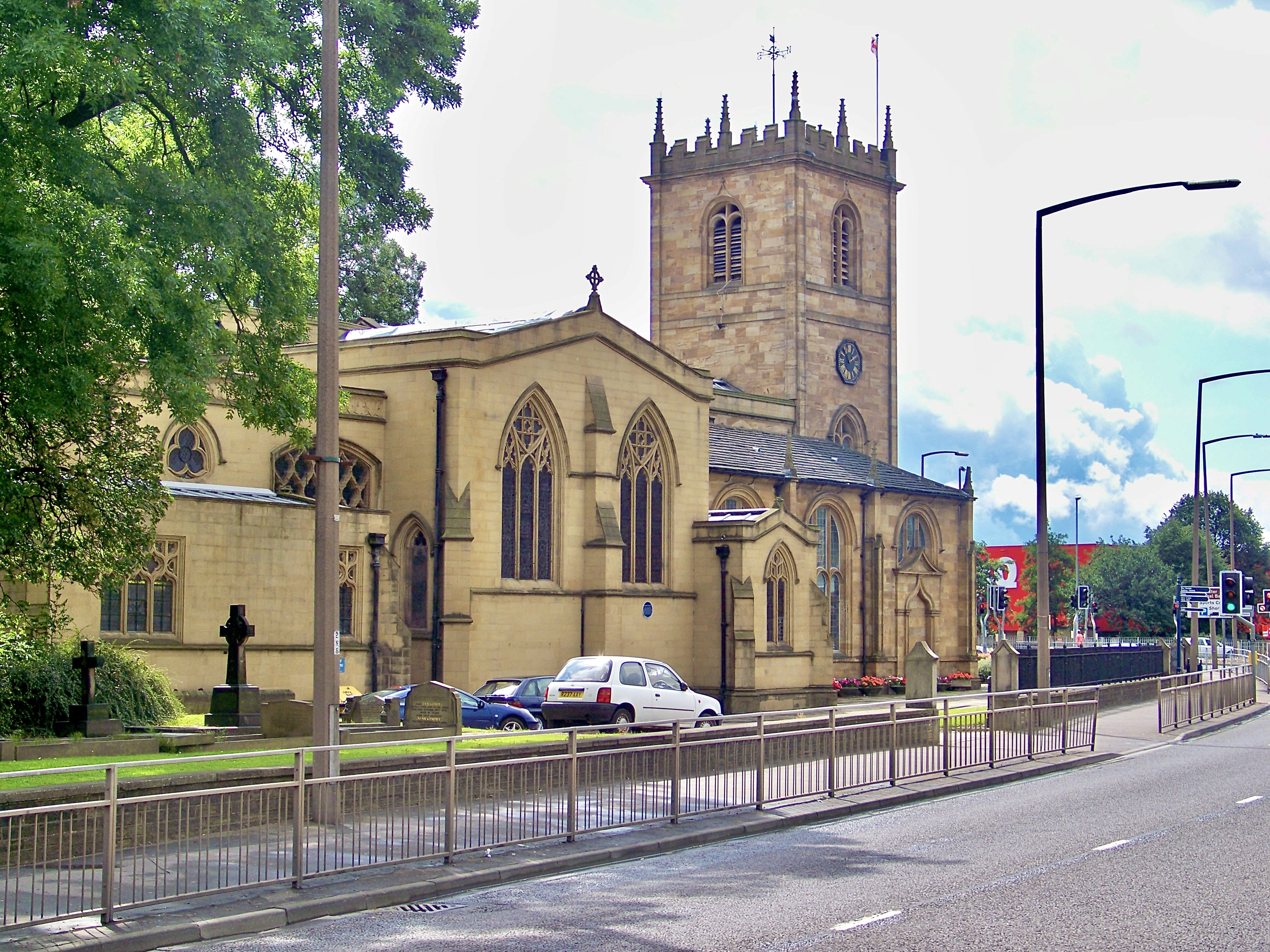
Dewsbury Minster

Dewsbury Minster lies near the River Calder, traditionally on the site where Paulinus preached. Some of the visible stonework in the nave is Saxon, and parts of the church also date to the 13th century. The tower houses "Black Tom", a bell which is rung each Christmas Eve, one toll for each year since Christ's birth, known as the "Devil's Knell", a tradition dating from the 15th century. The bell was given by Sir Thomas de Soothill, in penance for murdering a servant boy in a fit of rage. The tradition was commemorated on a Royal Mail postage stamp in 1986.

In the Domesday Book of 1086, Dewsbury was in Morley wapentake, but with a recorded population of only nine households it was a relatively small settlement at that time. The Agbrigg and Morley wapentakes were administratively combined into the Agbrigg and Morley wapentake in the 13th century. When they were separated for administrative purposes in the mid-19th century, Dewsbury parish had grown to straddle the border between both wapentakes, hence being mainly in the Lower Division of the Wapentake of Agbrigg.

Dewsbury market was established in the 14th century for local clothiers. Occurrences of the plague in 1593 and 1603 closed the market and it reopened in 1741.

Throughout the Middle Ages, Dewsbury retained a measure of importance in ecclesiastical terms, collecting tithes from as far away as Halifax in the mid-14th century. John Wesley visited the area five times in the mid-18th century, and the first Methodist Society was established in 1746. Centenary Chapel on Daisy Hill commemorates the centenary of this event, and the Methodist tradition remained strong in the town.

=== Industrial Revolution ===
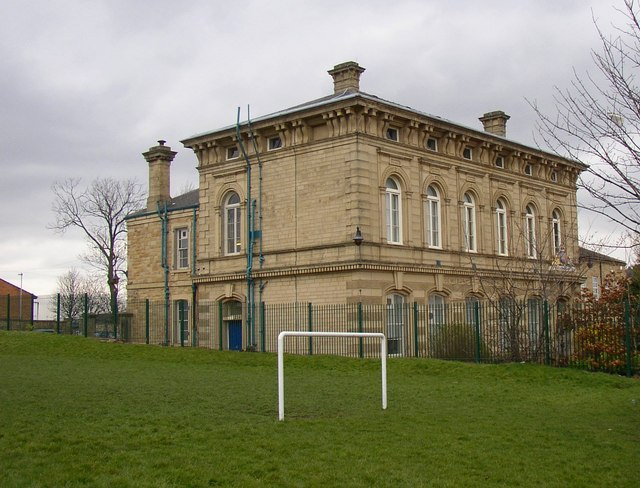
The Dewsbury County Court

In 1770, a short branch of the Calder and Hebble Navigation was completed, linking Dewsbury to the canal system giving access to Manchester and Hull. By the time of the Industrial Revolution, Dewsbury was a centre for the shoddy and mungo industries which recycled woollen items by mixing them with new wool and making heavy blankets and uniforms. The town benefited economically from the canal, its location at the heart of the Heavy Woollen District, and its proximity to coal mines. The railway arrived in 1848 when Dewsbury Wellington Road railway station on the London and North Western Railway opened. This is the only station which remains open.

Other stations were Dewsbury Central on the Great Northern Railway which closed in 1964 and Dewsbury Market Place on the Lancashire and Yorkshire Railway which closed in 1930. A fourth goods-only railway station was built in the early 20th century at Savile Town by the Midland Railway. In 1985 a bypass road was built on the site of Central Station and its adjacent viaduct, and nothing remains of Market Place railway station. The 19th century saw a great increase in population, rising from 4,566 in 1801 to around 30,000 by 1890.

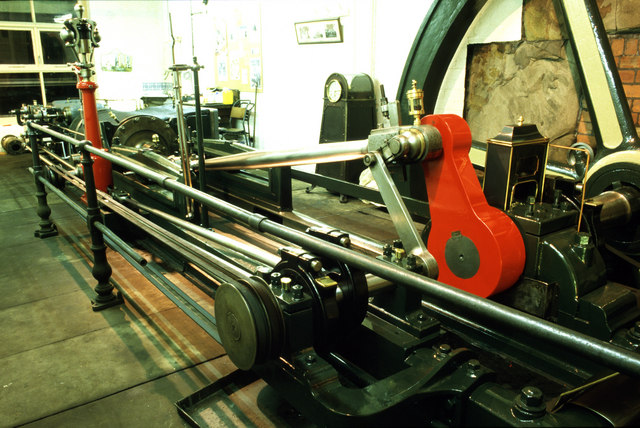
Steam engine, Providence Mills, Dewsbury

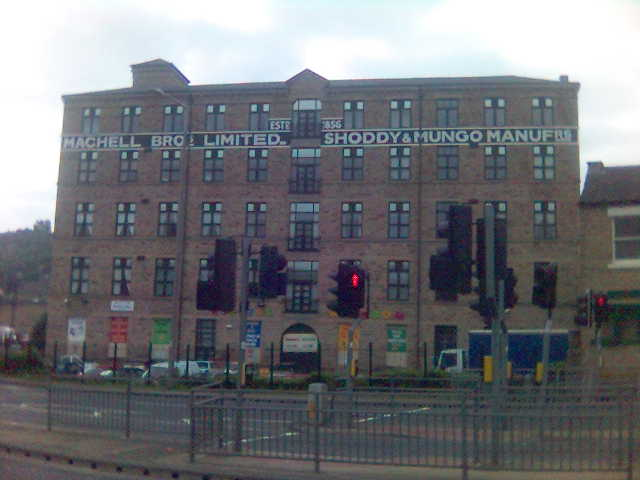
Machell's Shoddy and Mungo Mill in Dewsbury town centre

The town's rapid expansion and commitment to industrialisation resulted in social instability. In the early 19th century, Dewsbury was a centre of Luddite opposition to mechanisation in which workers retaliated against the mill owners who installed textile machinery and smashed the machines which threatened their way of life. In the 1830s, Dewsbury was a centre of Chartist agitation. In August 1838, after a speech by Chartist leader Feargus O'Connor, a mob of between five and seven thousand people besieged the Dewsbury Poor Law Guardians in the town's Royal Hotel. The mob was dispersed by troops.

Trouble flared in 1840 when radical agitators seized control of the town, and troops were stationed to maintain order. This radical tradition left a legacy in the town's political life: its first elected Member of Parliament (MP) in 1867 was John Simon, a Jewish lawyer from Jamaica and a Liberal. The tradition of firing the "Ten o'Clock" gun dates from 1815 and was a hangover from the Luddite problems. It was fired from Wormald and Walker's Mill to reassure that all was well, and could be heard all over the area. Eventually the actual gun was replaced with a specially made firework, but the tradition was discontinued in 1983 with the closure of the mill.

The mills were family businesses and continued manufacturing after the wool crisis in 1950–51, which saw Australian sheep farmers begin to charge higher prices. The recovery of the late 1960s was reversed by the 1973 oil crisis, and the textile industry in Dewsbury declined, with only bed manufacturing remaining a large scale employer.

=== Recent history ===
Significant immigration from the 1960s onwards left a huge demographic impact on the town, which continues today. Asian British and Muslims now make up roughly 45 percent of the population, and the percentage is expected to grow in the coming years.

After 2005, following negative press reports, Dewsbury was labelled a troubled town and became "the town that dare not speak its name" after high-profile crimes brought it into the media spotlight. In June 2005, a girl of 12 was charged with grievous bodily harm after attempting to hang a five-year-old boy from Chickenley. Mohammad Sidique Khan, ringleader of the group responsible for the 7 July 2005 London bombings, lived in Lees Holm, Dewsbury. In March 2015, Talha Asmal, a British teenager, travelled with his neighbour Hassan Munshi to Syria to join the Islamic State of Iraq and the Levant. Later in June, he became the youngest suicide bomber in the British history, aged seventeen at the time of his death.

On 19 February 2008, Shannon Matthews, a nine-year-old girl from the Moorside Estate, was reported missing. After a 24-day hunt which attracted huge media and public attention nationally, she was found hidden in a flat in the Batley Carr area on 14 March 2008. Her mother Karen Matthews, along with Michael Donovan, the uncle of her stepfather Craig Meehan, were later found guilty of abduction and false imprisonment, as part of a plot to claim the reward money for her safe return by pretending to have solved her disappearance; both were jailed for eight years.

In October 2010, the Dewsbury Revival Centre opened, in the refurbished former St Mark's Church on Halifax Road, the church attended by Wallace Hartley, bandmaster of the Titanic.

In July 2014, Kirklees Council enforced a media ban covering the visit of Princess Anne, who was due to deliver a speech on the importance of restorative justice. Kirklees Council later responded that the highly unusual media ban had been insisted upon by the Royal Household. Buckingham Palace, however, was mystified over the ban, with a Royal spokesman stating: "This visit has been openly listed in the future engagements section on the Royal website for the last eight weeks. There are no restrictions on reporting on the event from the Royal Household."

== Governance ==
Dewsbury was incorporated as a municipal borough in 1862. Its first mayor was Dr George Fearnley. The Representation of the People Act 1867 constituted Dewsbury a parliamentary borough, and Liberal candidate John Simon, serjeant-at-law, was returned as the borough's first MP. The Victorian town hall standing in front of the old marketplace dates from 1886 to 1889. Dewsbury's boundaries were expanded to include the urban districts of Ravensthorpe, Thornhill, and Soothill Nether, and part of Soothill Upper, in 1910, and in 1913 it was elevated to county borough status. "Soothill Nether" refers to the current east end of the town, although at that time Chickenley and Chidswell were hamlets, and Earlsheaton contained the bulk of the area's population.

In 1974, responsibility for local government passed to Kirklees Metropolitan Council, its headquarters being in Huddersfield. The population of Dewsbury has remained broadly static over the past century: the 1911 census recorded 53,351 people, and the 1971 census 51,326 people, making it the fourth-least populous county borough in England (after Canterbury, Burton upon Trent and Great Yarmouth).

The current Member of Parliament (MP) for Dewsbury and Batley is Iqbal Mohamed, who has represented the constituency since the 2024 general election. Mohamed was one of four independent candidates who won seats in heavily Muslim areas largely due to Labour's stance on the Gaza war.

== Geography ==
Dewsbury is situated between Leeds and Bradford 8 miles (13 km) to the north, Huddersfield a similar distance to the south west, and Wakefield 6 mi (10 km) east. Its proximity to these major urban centres, the M1 and M62 motorways and its position on the Huddersfield Line, served by the TransPennine Express, have contributed to its growth.

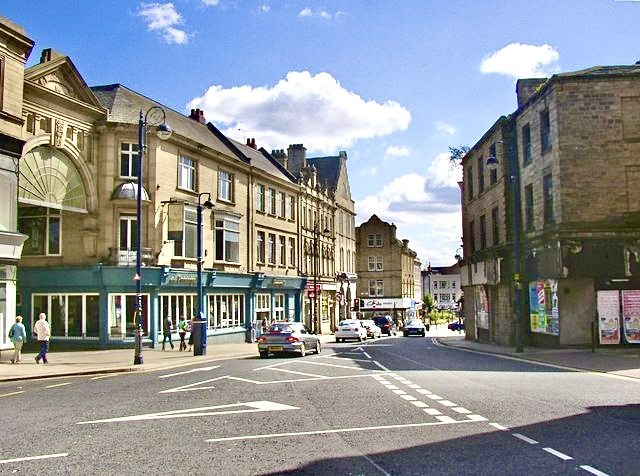
Junction of Northgate and Halifax Road

Dewsbury is part of the West Yorkshire Urban Area, although its natural boundaries are not well-defined, with built up areas of the town running into Batley, Heckmondwike and Ossett.

Geologically, the town is situated on rocks of the Carboniferous Period, consisting of coal measures and gritstones. Quaternary Period rock, glacial deposits and gravels exist in the Calder Valley. Coal, sandstone and gravel have been exploited commercially. Average rainfall is 100 cm per annum. The town is dominated by hills, notably Earlsheaton, Dewsbury Moor, Staincliffe and Thornhill. The town centre is between 130 and 180 feet (40 and 55 metres) above sea level, rising to 360 ft (110 m) at Earlsheaton and Batley Carr, and 755 ft (230 m) at Grange Moor. The approach from Earlsheaton through the Wakefield Road cutting, constructed in 1830, is dramatic with the view of the town centre in the Calder Valley opening up.

=== Divisions and suburbs ===
Dewsbury has a number of districts with different geographical and socio-economic patterns, they are, Chickenley, Crackenedge, Dewsbury Moor, Earlsheaton, Eastborough, Eightlands, Flatts, Ravensthorpe, Savile Town, Shaw Cross, Scout Hill, Thornhill Lees, Westborough, Westtown. Batley Carr, Hanging Heaton and Staincliffe have areas which lie in both Dewsbury and neighbouring Batley. Thornhill, Briestfield and Whitley Lower are part of Dewsbury unparished area. Thornhill was annexed in 1910.

== Demography and economy ==
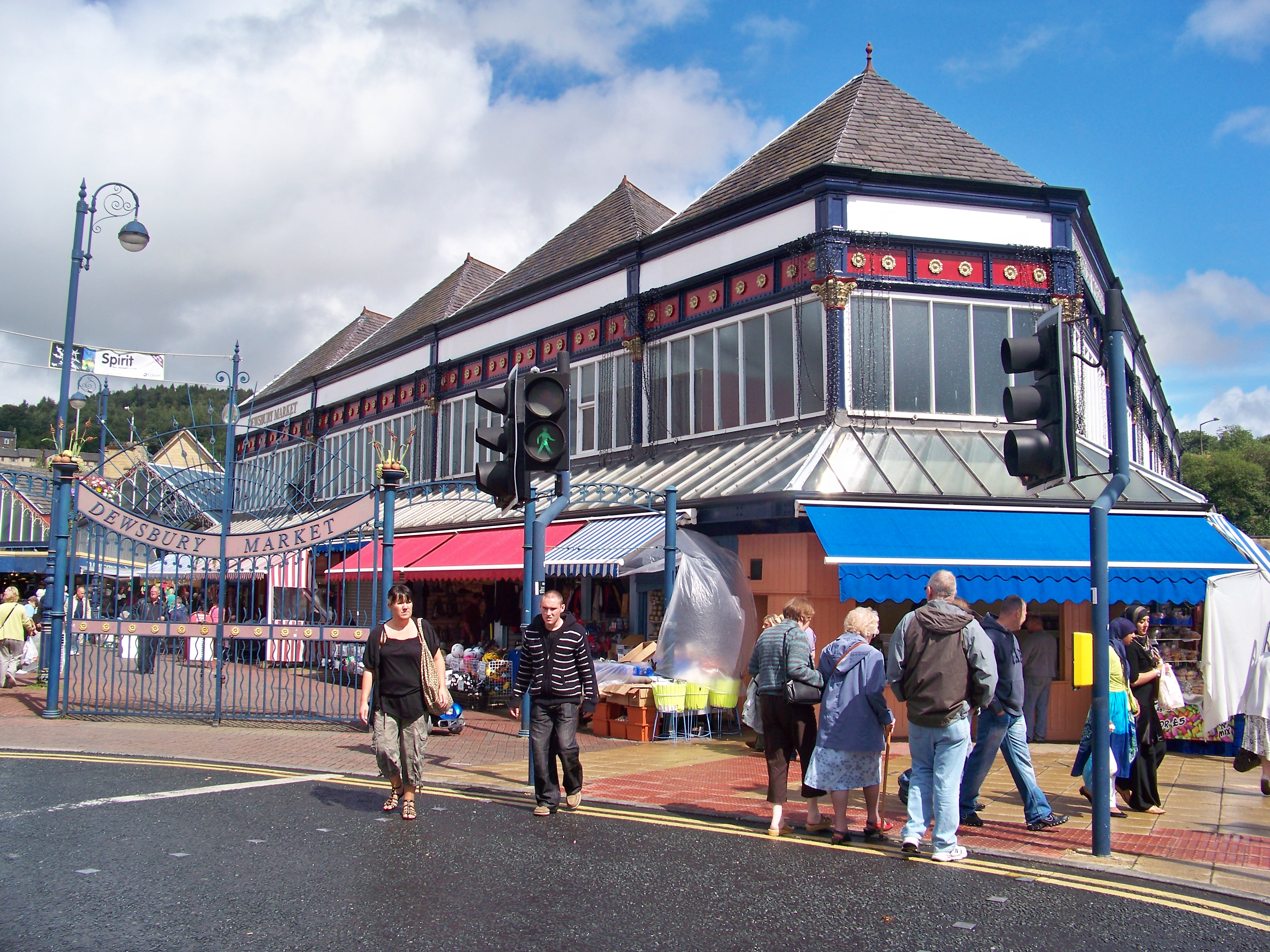
Dewsbury Market

The Westtown area has the large and imposing Our Lady and St. Paulinus Roman Catholic Church and its school, once run by the nuns of the area. The Irish National Club also is home to Dewsbury Celtic amateur rugby league club.

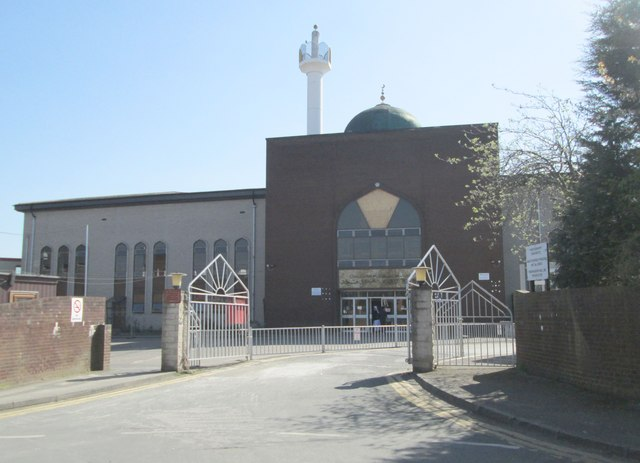
Markazi Masjid, Savile Town

The town has a large Muslim community. Savile Town and Ravensthorpe are populated mainly by Muslims of Indian and Pakistani origin. In recent years, there has also been an immigration of Iraqi Kurds and Hungarians into the town. Dewsbury has been accused of having a controversial Shariah arbitration court. Dewsbury Moor, Ravensthorpe and Chickenley are classed among the 10% most deprived areas in the UK. In contrast to some British towns and cities, the east side of the town is generally more affluent. The majority of houses in the town are in the cheapest band for council tax, for house prices are amongst the lowest in the country.

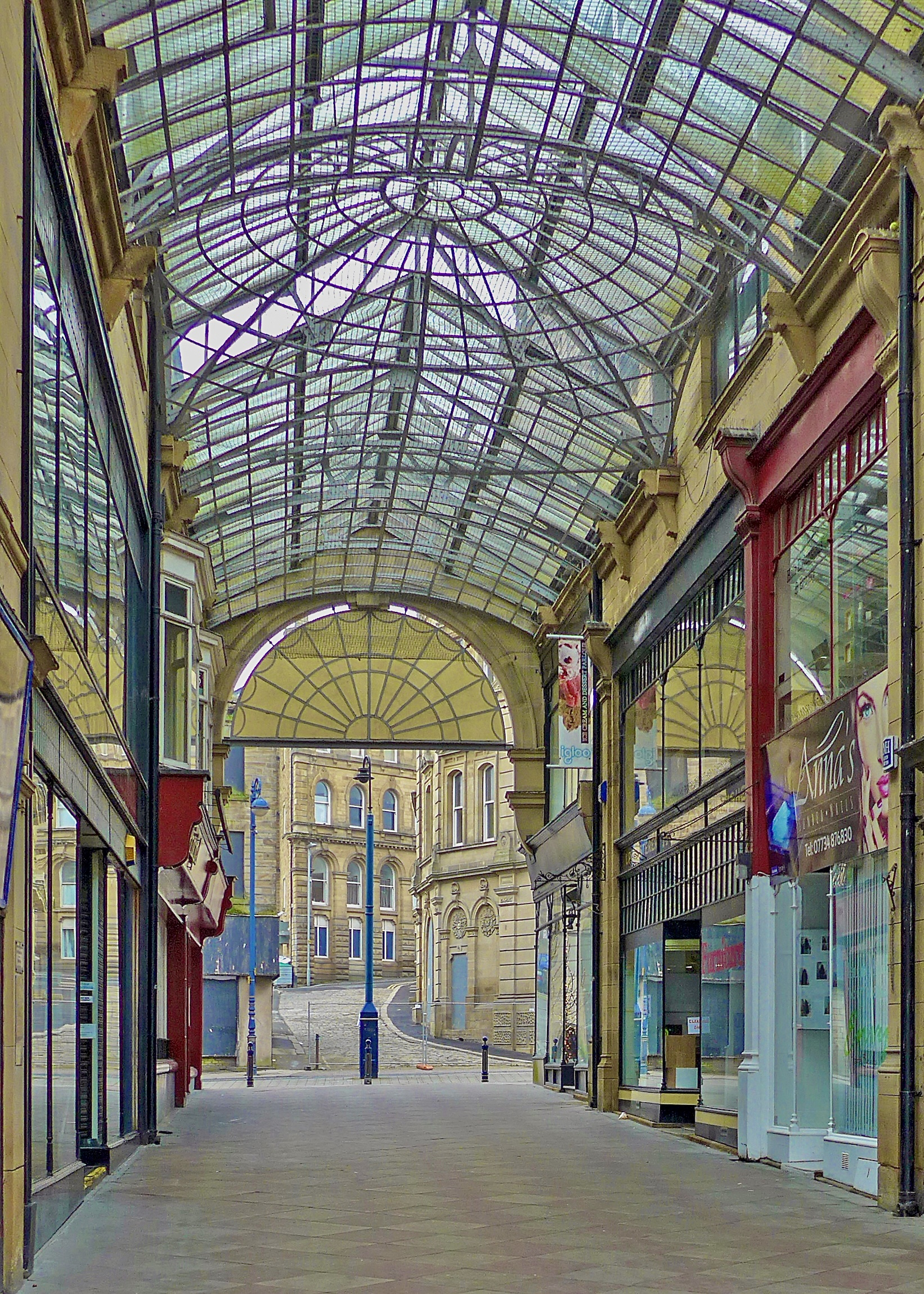
Kingsway Shopping Arcade

The local market once consisted of 400 stalls and was one of the busiest in Yorkshire and in years gone by drew large numbers of visitors to the town. Wednesdays and Saturdays are the normal market days with the popular flea market on Fridays. The town's mills were located just south of the River Calder in the town centre. As the mills closed this area became a large brownfield site. However, many of the units have been reoccupied and the town's largest employer, Carlton Cards, is based in this area.

=== Ethnic groups ===
As of 2021, Dewsbury's population was enumerated at 63,722, and its ethnic makeup was 50.8% White, 44.4% Asian, 2.3% Mixed, 0.8% Black, and 1.4% Other.

=== Religions ===
As of the 2021 census, Dewsbury's religious makeup was 46.4% Muslim, 28.9% Christian, 23.7% no religion, and the town has small Hindu and Sikh communities.

== Transport ==
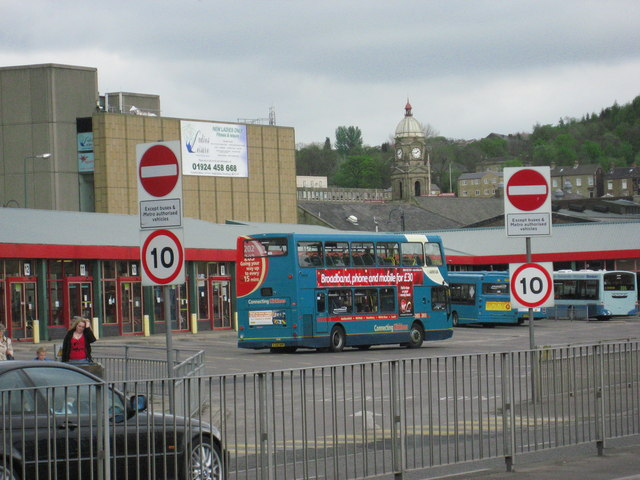
Dewsbury bus station

Dewsbury bus station is managed by West Yorkshire Metro; it was rebuilt in 1994 with a main passenger concourse and 19 bus stands. Services are operated primarily by Arriva Yorkshire. Routes connect the town with Bradford, Huddersfield, Leeds, Morley and Wakefield.

Dewsbury railway station is a stop on the Huddersfield line. It is served by two train operating companies:

- Northern Trains operates services to Bradford Interchange, Halifax, Leeds, Manchester Victoria and Wigan Wallgate
- TransPennine Express provides direct services to Huddersfield, Leeds, Manchester Victoria, Manchester Piccadilly, Manchester Airport, Redcar Central, Scarborough and York.

== Sport ==
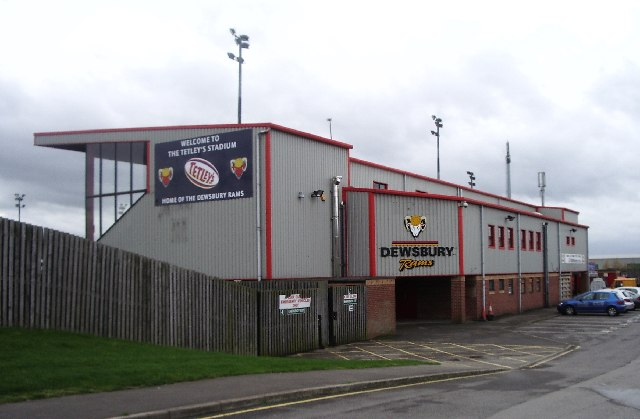
Crown Flatt stadium, also known as Tetley's Stadium for sponsorship purposes

Dewsbury Rams, formerly Dewsbury R.L.F.C., plays in rugby league's Betfred League One; it is based at Crown Flatt. Shaw Cross Sharks is an amateur Rugby League club, founded in 1947; it has produced several players into the professional game, including Mike Stephenson, Nigel Stephenson and David Ward. It operates from Shaw Cross Club for Young People and play their home fixtures at the adjacent Paul Lee Hinchcliffe Memorial Playing Fields.

The open age first team is the National Conference League. Dewsbury Celtic play in National League 3; their ground is on the west side of the town, in Crow Nest Park. The club's headquarters are at the Dewsbury Irish National Club on Park Parade. Dewsbury is also the home of Dewsbury Rangers Football Club. With over 300 members from the ages of six through to the old boys' teams, it is one of the largest in the area.

== Culture ==
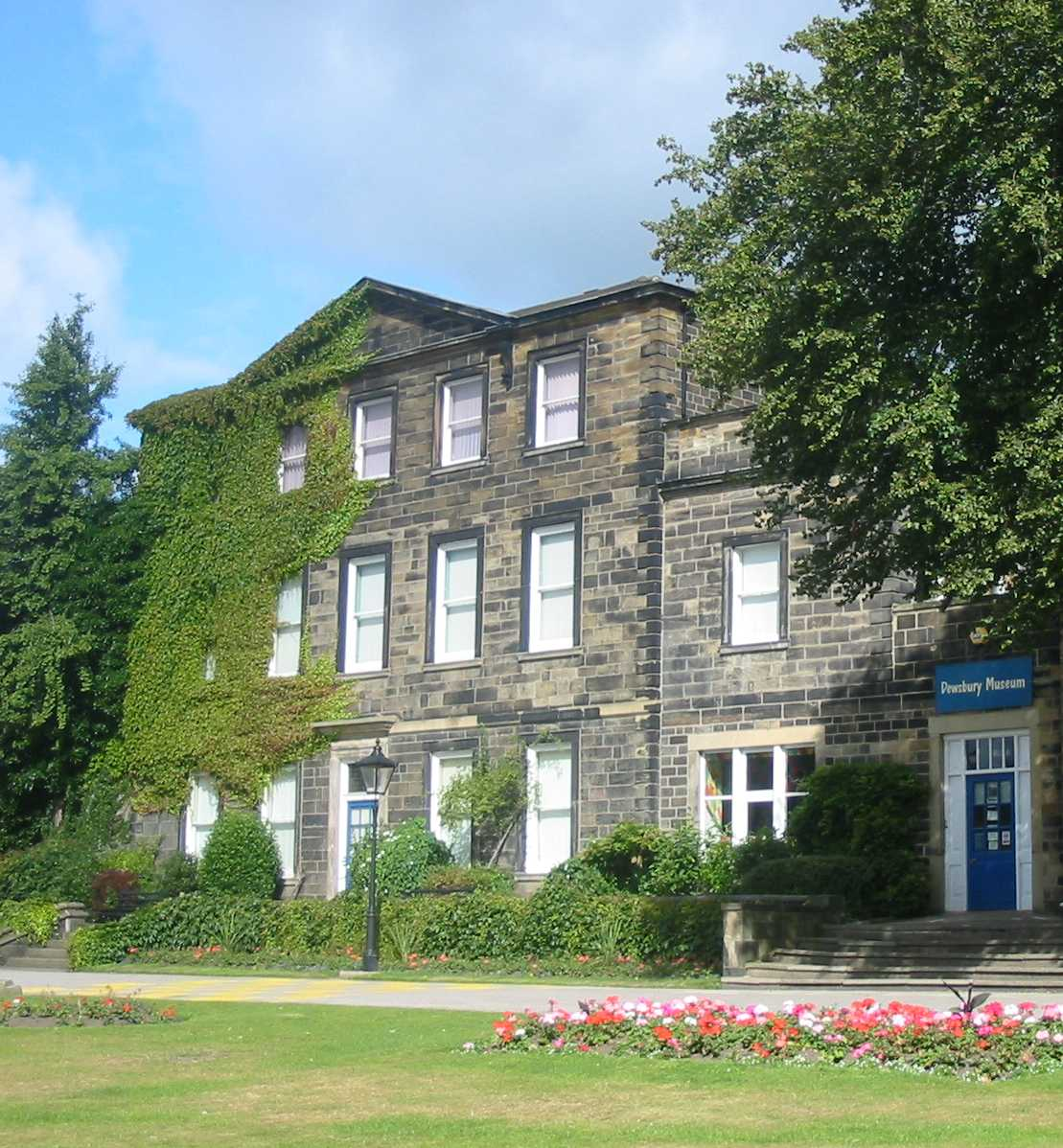
Dewsbury Museum, in Crow Nest Park

Dewsbury Museum was located within the mansion house in Crow Nest Park, before it closed to the public in November 2016. Nearby attractions include the National Coal Mining Museum for England, located in Overton, Wakefield.

Dewsbury Town Hall contains a 700-seater concert hall and regularly hosts concerts, exhibitions, live music, cabaret evenings and weddings.

The town also has an annual event called Spirit, a street theatre show every winter which takes place in the town centre.

The comedy film Destination: Dewsbury was filmed and partly set in the town. The production was shot in 2016 and premiered at the 2018 Beverly Hills Film Festival.

== Local media ==
Local news and television programmes are provided by BBC Yorkshire and ITV Yorkshire. Television signals are received from the Emley Moor TV transmitter.

Dewsbury's local radio stations are BBC Radio Leeds on 92.4 FM, Heart Yorkshire on 106.2 FM, Capital Yorkshire on 105.6 FM, Greatest Hits Radio Yorkshire on 96.3 FM, Hits Radio West Yorkshire on 102.5 FM, and Branch Radio, a community based radio station that broadcast from the town on 101.8 FM.

The Dewsbury Reporter is the town's local weekly newspaper.

== Education ==
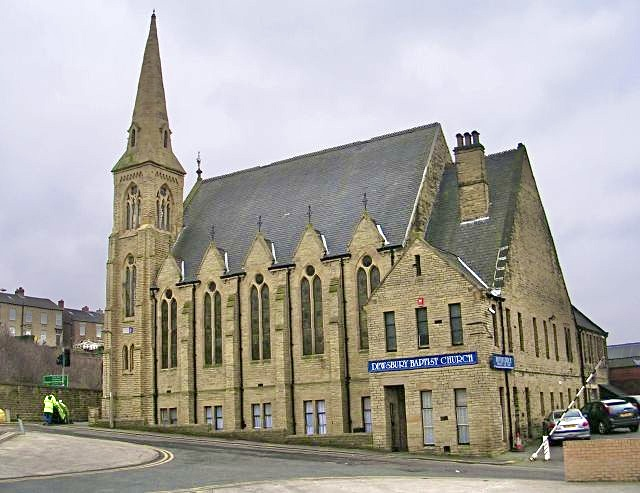
Dewsbury Baptist Church

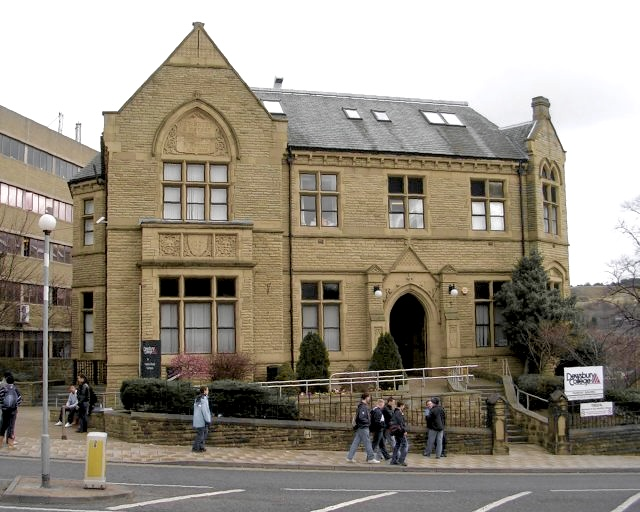
Dewsbury and District Technical School of Art and Science

Dewsbury had two grammar schools: Wheelwright Grammar School for Boys and Wheelwright Grammar School for Girls further up the hill. The 1970s education reforms converted these two establishments to high schools and they were renamed Dewsbury College and Birkdale High School. Dewsbury College was merged with Huddersfield Technical College to become part of Kirklees College in 2008, and is now known by that name.

Birkdale High School closed in July 2011. In the 2005 School League Tables, Dewsbury's Eastborough Junior, Infants and Nursery schools were reported to have the most consistently improved results over the past four years. However, the headteacher of the school, Nicola Roth, has been highly critical of School League Tables in the UK, and has been reported to have said, "It would be better if league tables did not exist".

Batley College of Art and Design, which is part of Kirklees College (Dewsbury Centre), has a strong reputation for print and textile-based art work, whilst St John Fisher Catholic Voluntary Academy is a specialist Sports College and is one of the few schools in the area with a Sixth Form.

== Notable people ==
Due to the placement of Dewsbury and District Hospital, many notable people have been born in the town. For a fuller list, see Category:People from Dewsbury

The following people are or were from Dewsbury:

- Sir Thomas Clifford Allbutt (1836–1925), physician; inventor of the medical thermometer.
- Betty Boothroyd, Baroness Boothroyd (1929–2023), politician; first female Speaker of the House of Commons between 1992 and 2000.
- Roger Burnley (born 1966), businessman, CEO of Asda
- Tim Fountain (born 1967), playwright and author.
- Joel Graham (born 1977), bassist for thrash metal band Evile.
- Brendon Grimshaw, (1925–2012), managing editor, the Standard, Dar es salaam, Tanzania.
- Bob Hardy (born 1980), bassist for popular Scottish post-punk revival band, Franz Ferdinand.
- Philip Hinchcliffe (born 1944), retired television producer, screenwriter and script editor.
- Tom Kilburn (1921–2001), computer engineer; co-inventor of the first stored-program computer.
- Betty Lockwood, Baroness Lockwood (1924–2019), politician and activist for women's rights.
- Andrew Morton (born 1953), writer, journalist and biographer of royalty and celebrities.
- Hafiz Patel (1926–2016), Muslim religious leader who founded the Markazi Masjid
- Kazia Pelka (born 1960), actress famous for roles in soap-operas.
- Valentine Pelka (born 1956) is an English actor who has starred in film and on television
- Sir Owen Willans Richardson (1879–1959), physicist, won the Nobel Prize in Physics in 1928 for his work of thermionic emission.
- Sayeeda Warsi, Baroness Warsi of Dewsbury (born 1971), Conservative politician.

=== Sportspeople ===
- Caitlin Beevers (born 2001), rugby league footballer for Leeds Rhinos Women.
- Leigh Bromby (born 1980), footballer for Leeds United.
- Alistair Brownlee (born 1988), triathlete, having won the gold medals at the 2012 London Olympics, the 2016 Rio de Janeiro Olympics and the 2014 Commonwealth Games.
- George Burgess (born 1992), professional rugby league player for South Sydney Rabbitohs of the National Rugby League and for England
- Luke Burgess (born 1987), former professional rugby league footballer
- Sam Burgess (born 1988), professional rugby league player for South Sydney Rabbitohs of the National Rugby League and for England, he is a dual-code rugby international.
- Tom Burgess (born 1992), professional rugby league player for South Sydney Rabbitohs of the National Rugby League and for England
- Francis Cummins (born 1976), professional rugby league coach and former player. He played for Leeds Rhinos and represented Great Britain, England and Ireland at international level.
- Matt Diskin (born 1982), rugby league footballer for Bradford; his career began at the amateur Dewsbury Moor ARLFC.
- Andrew Gale (born 1983), cricketer and captain for Yorkshire.
- Keith Mason (born 1982), actor and former rugby league footballer. He represented England (Under-21) and Wales at international level.
- John Pitt (born 1937), first-class cricketer
- Mike "Stevo" Stephenson (born 1947), Sky Sports commentator and former rugby league footballer.
- Tymal Mills (born 1992), cricketer for Sussex.
- Gary Sykes (born 1984), former super featherweight boxing champion.
- Richard Tracey (born 1979), footballer.
- Eddie Waring (1910–1986), rugby league coach, commentator and television presenter.
- Tommy Weston (1902–1981), jockey who rode eleven English Classic winners and was Champion Jockey in 1926.

== In popular culture ==
Dewsbury is referenced in the Beatles' 1967 film Magical Mystery Tour. A line of dialogue in the film has one of the magicians (all portrayed by the Beatles themselves) – who are keeping an eye on the whereabouts of the bus that is taking its passengers on the journey of the film's title – exclaim: "The bus is 10 miles [16 km] north on the Dewsbury road and they're having a lovely time!" Dewsbury is also referenced in the 1991 single "It's Grim Up North" by the Justified Ancients of Mu Mu (also known as the KLF).

The 1960 book A Kind of Loving is set in a fictional city named "Cressley", but its description was based upon Dewsbury. The author, Stan Barstow, was born in Horbury and grew up in Ossett – both of which are just to the east of Dewsbury.

More recently, the phrase "Dewsbury noir" has been used to describe the violent novels of David Peace, who was born in Dewsbury but lives in neighbouring Ossett.

== See also ==
- Listed buildings in Dewsbury
