= Listed buildings in Dewsbury =

Dewsbury is a town and an unparished area in the metropolitan borough of Kirklees, West Yorkshire, England. It contains 134 listed buildings that are recorded in the National Heritage List for England. Of these, two are listed at Grade I, the highest of the three grades, three are at Grade II*, the middle grade, and the others are at Grade II, the lowest grade. The list consists of the listed buildings in the town and the countryside to the south, and includes the districts, villages and smaller settlements of Boothroyd, Briestfield, Hanging Heaton, Overthorpe, Ravensthorpe, Thornhill, and Whitley Lower. (Note: The list contains the listed buildings in the wards of Dewsbury East, Dewsbury South and Dewsbury West, plus three buildings in Batley East Ward that are nearer to the town of Dewsbury than to Batley.)

Dewsbury was a market town until the arrival of the Industrial Revolution, which brought the woollen industry to the area. This was made possible by the communications provided by the River Calder and the Calder and Hebble Navigation which pass to the south of the town, and the railway, which passes through it. The listed buildings associated with water transport include locks, bridges, and a milestone, and those associated with the railway are a railway station, a viaduct, a bridges, and a series of underbridges. Crow Nest Park was developed in the grounds of Crow Nest House, which is listed together with structures in its grounds, and its three main entrances. The other listed buildings include houses and associated structures, cottages, farmhouses and farm buildings, churches and items in churchyards, schools, the base of a market cross and a memorial stone, shops, offices and warehouses, a road bridge, a textile mill and a former mill, a boundary stone, public houses and a hotel, a set of toll gates, banks, civic buildings, a former hospital, cemetery buildings, two war memorials, and telephone kiosks.

== Key ==
Grade	Criteria
I	Buildings of exceptional interest, sometimes considered to be internationally important
II*	Particularly important buildings of more than special interest
II	Buildings of national importance and special interest

== Buildings ==
Name and location	Photograph	Date	Notes	Grade
All Saints Church; 53.68967°N 1.62928°W		12th or early 13th century	The oldest parts of the church are the arcades. The church was largely rebuilt in 1765–67 by John Carr, there were extensive alterations in 1823, 1884–48, and 1895, and in 1994 the interior of the church was reordered. It is built in stone with roofs in stone slate and lead, and consists of a nave with a clerestory, north and south aisles, north and south transepts, a chancel with chapels and a north vestry, and a west tower. The tower has three stages, north and west doorways, and an embattled parapet with eight crocketed pinnacles. The east window has seven lights.	II*
Ruins of old Thornhill Hall; 53.66616°N 1.61355°W	—	1450	The hall was destroyed in an explosion in 1648 during the Civil War. It is on a moated site, and all that remains are a fireplace, and part of a wall containing the sill of a window and part of its moulded surround. There are also two eroded limestone eagles that have been moved from elsewhere.	II
St Michael's Church, Thornhill; 53.66566°N 1.61807°W		15th century	The oldest part of the church is the west tower, which possibly contains older fabric. The Savile (north) chapel dates from 1447 and was extended in 1493, the chancel and south chapel date from 1490, and alterations and additions were made in 1877 by G. E. Street. The church is built in stone with a stone slate roof, and consists of a nave with a clerestory, north and south aisles, a south porch, a chancel with a clerestory, north and south chapels, and a west tower. Most of the church is in Perpendicular style, and Street's alterations are in Decorated style. The tower has two tall stages with diagonal buttresses, a west doorway with a moulded surround, and an embattled parapet on corbel brackets with eight crocketed pinnacles. The Savile chapel contains an important collection of monuments.	I
Thornhill Lees Hall; 53.67593°N 1.64865°W		Late 15th to early 16th century	This consists of the remaining east wing and part of the hall range of a timber framed house, and the rest having been demolished. In the 17th century the hall range was extended and encased in stone, and the house was restored in 1962–64. The east wing has two storeys and two bays. The hall range has quoins and some brick infill, and there are 2½ bays.	I
Former Thornhill Grammar School; 53.66590°N 1.62083°W		1643	The former grammar school, which was extended in 1884, is in stone on a plinth, with quoins, and a stone slate roof with hollow chamfered gable copings on moulded kneelers with finials. The doorway has a moulded surround and a deep dated lintel, the windows in the gable ends are mullioned and transomed, and in the four-bay sides are cross windows.	II
17 and 19 Kirkgate, Hanging Heaton; 53.70419°N 1.61366°W	—	17th century	A house, later divided, it is in stone and rendered brick with a stone slate roof. There are two storeys, a three-bay hall range and a cross-wing. The doorway has a fanlight, and the windows are sashes. Attached is a stable and a hayloft.	II
Combs Hall Farmhouse; 53.66598°N 1.62046°W		Mid 17th century (probable)	The farmhouse is in stone, partly rendered, with string courses, and a stone slate roof with chamfered gable copings. There are two storeys and two gabled bays. In the centre are two Tudor arched doorways, and above is an ornamental dated rainwater head. Most of the windows are mullioned, and in the right gable end is a round-headed fire window.	II
Boundary wall, Combs Hall Farmhouse; 53.66610°N 1.62022°W	—	17th century	The wall encloses the garden at the front of the farmhouse. It is in stone, with stepped shaped coping, and includes an ornamental arched gateway.	II
Brewhouse, Combs Hall Farmhouse; 53.66593°N 1.62028°W	—	17th century	The former brewhouse in the garden of the farmhouse is in stone, and has chamfered gable copings on moulded kneelers. There is one storey and one bay, and in the gable end is a doorway with a moulded surround and a single-light window above.	II
Former gatehouse, Lees Hall; 53.67581°N 1.64835°W	—	17th century	The outbuilding, thought to have been a gatehouse, is derelict and without a roof. It is timber framed with brick infill, and stone on the south side. There is one storey and one bay.	II
Barn northeast of Lees Hall; 53.67594°N 1.64838°W	—	17th century	A timber framed barn, encased in stone, with quoins, and a stone slate roof. There is an outshut to the east, and the openings have been altered.	II
The Second House, Lees Hall; 53.67583°N 1.64884°W	—	17th century	Originally the west wing of the main hall, it was later detached, and expanded in the 19th century. The house is in stone on a plinth, and has a stone slate roof with hollow chamfered copings on the left. There are two storeys, a rectangular plan, and three bays. The left bay contains a twelve-light mullioned and transomed window, with a hood mould and a gable above. The other windows are mullioned with hood moulds, the doorway has a chamfered surround and a triangular lintel, and to its left is a projecting chimney breast.	II*
Main barn, Lodge Farm; 53.67203°N 1.61501°W	—	17th century (probable)	The barn is timber framed and encased in stone probably in the 18th century. It has a stone slate roof, 3½ bays, an aisle in a continuous outshut to the east, and a 1½-bay outshut on the west. The barn contains a square-headed cart entry.	II
Memorial stone and cross base 53.66545°N 1.62534°W		17th century (or earlier)	The base of the market cross consists of a round stone with a socket on the top. Alongside is a memorial stone dated 1835 that originated as a drinking fountain. It consists of a square red sandstone post with rendered panels, and a decoratively carved four-gabled cap. On one side is an iron bowl and former fountain, and on the opposite side is an inscribed brass plate.	II
Barn at rear of Orchard Farm House; 53.65321°N 1.65112°W	—	17th century	The barn is timber framed, it has been encased in stone, probably in the 18th century, and later extended; it has quoins and a stone slate roof. The barn contains a central square-headed cart entry with outshuts on each side, and in the left gable end are square vent holes.	II
The Old Rectory, Thornhill; 53.66586°N 1.61622°W		17th century	The rectory, later used for other purposes, was largely rebuilt in 1824. It is in stone with quoins, a sill band, dentilled gutter brackets, and a hipped slate roof. There are two storeys, a central block of three bays, a projecting two-bay hip-roofed block to the left, and a single-bay gabled block on the right. The outer blocks contain bow windows, the other windows are sashes, and in the left angle is a later conservatory.	II
Thornhill Hall; 53.66590°N 1.61274°W	—	17th century	The house, which was altered and extended in 1879, is in stone with quoins, and a stone slate roof with coped gables, cut kneelers, and finials. There are two storeys, and the extensions were added at right angles. The windows are mullioned or mullioned and transomed.	II
Thornhill Hall Cottages; 53.66681°N 1.61305°W		17th century or earlier	A pair of cottages that were altered in the 20th century, they are in stone with quoins and a stone slate roof. There are two storeys, the ground floor back to earth, and three bays. The windows are casements, and inside there is an upper-cruck truss.	II
Main farm building, Thornhill Hall; 53.66619°N 1.61177°W	—	17th century	The farm building, which has been altered and used for various purposes, is in stone with quoins, and a stone slate roof with coped gables and finials. It has an L-shaped plan, and is partly in two storeys. The openings include segmental-headed cart entries, some openings with massive lintels, there is a gabled cart entry, ventilation slits, and casement windows.	II
Chickenley Heath Farmhouse and Outbuildings; 53.69208°N 1.59918°W	—	Late 17th century	The farmhouse has been much altered and extended. The earliest part is in red brick, there is an 18th-century stone outbuilding extension to the north, and a 19th-century stone farmhouse extension at right angles to the south, partly rendered. The roofs are in stone slate, Welsh slate, and corrugated iron, and there are two storeys. The windows are a mix of sashes and casements, and there are the remains of some mullioned windows in the outbuilding.	II
Park House Farmhouse and outbuildings 53.66968°N 1.62028°W	—	c. 1700	The adjoining farmhouse and outbuildings were added to the original farmhouse in the 19th century. All the buildings are in stone with stone slate roofs and two storeys. The original farmhouse has two bays, a gabled porch, and an outshut. The later farmhouse forms a cross-wing, and has a symmetrical front of three bays and a central gable. The barn is in line with the original farmhouse, and it contains opposed elliptical-headed cart entries, square pitching holes, and vents, and the other outbuildings form a courtyard with the rear of the barn.	II
9 Chapel Lane, Overthorpe; 53.66458°N 1.62788°W	—	17th or early 18th century	A stone house, restored in the 20th century, it is in stone, and has a stone slate roof with chamfered gable copings and moulded kneelers. There are two storeys and two bays. The doorway has a Tudor arch and the windows are mullioned. The hood mould over the left window in the ground floor rises over the doorway.	II
2, 4 and 6 Combs Road, Thornhill; 53.66659°N 1.61749°W	—	17th or early 18th century	A house, later divided, it is in stone with quoins and coped gables with cut kneelers. There are two storeys, a double depth plan, and three bays. The doorway has a chamfered surround, and the windows are double chamfered and mullioned with three lights.	II
Crow Nest House; 53.68794°N 1.64797°W		Early 18th century	A large house in Crow Nest Park, it is in stone with rusticated quoins, a floor band, and a hipped roof. There are three storeys, five bays with a pediment over the middle three bays, and flanking two-storey, one bay extensions, each with a cornice and a blocking course. The central doorway has a rectangular fanlight, an architrave, a pulvinated frieze and a cornice, and the windows are sashes in architraves. At the rear is a central doorway with a stair window above, mullioned and transomed windows, and a canted bay window.	II
12, 14 and 16 Kirkgate, Hanging Heaton; 53.70375°N 1.61542°W	—	Mid 18th century	A house, later divided, it is in stone, with quoins and a stone slate roof with coped gables and moulded kneelers. There are two storeys and attics, and the main bock is flanked by single-storey extensions with hipped roofs. In the centre of the garden front is a doorway with a fanlight and a moulded flat hood. On each side is a canted bay window, there are similar bay windows in the extensions, and the other windows are a mix of sashes, casements and mullioned windows.	II
Barn and farm buildings, Headfield Farm; 53.67988°N 1.63144°W	—	c. 1753 (probable)	The buildings are in stone and some later brickwork, with quoins, and a stone slate roof with chamfered gable copings, cut kneelers and a finial. The openings include segmental-headed cart entries, arched entrances, and a window, now blocked, with a triangular lintel, and there are two re-used datestones.	II
Lodge Farmhouse; 53.67196°N 1.61438°W	—	Mid to late 18th century	The farmhouse is in stone, partly rendered, with quoins and a stone slate roof. There are two storeys, two bays, and a rear outshut. The windows are mullioned with three lights.	II
The Temple, Crow Nest Park; 53.68728°N 1.64799°W		Mid to late 18th century	A summer house in stone, consisting of a square building with a basement and one bay, with a continuous sill band, an eaves cornice, and a blocking course. On each face is a round-arched recess, one containing a doorway, and the others blocked windows, each with a chambranle, a pulvinated frieze, and a triangular pediment on small corbels. Stone steps lead to a doorway in the basement.	II
Low Mill Lane Bridge and entrance gate 53.67504°N 1.67172°W		c. 1769	The bridge carries a road over the Calder and Hebble Navigation at the west junction of the River Calder with the Greenwood Cut. It is in stone with copings, rendered under the arch, and consists of a single low segmental arch at an angle. The bridge and its parapets end in round capped buttresses. The adjacent lock is in stone, with a parapet to the north, and it contains wooden gates.	II
Greenwood Lock; 53.67385°N 1.66508°W		c. 1769	The lock is on the Calder and Hebble Navigation at the east junction of the River Calder with the Greenwood Cut. It is in stone with coping, and contains two pairs of wooden gates. There is a later wooden footbridge approached on both sides by setts.	II
Lock at New Cut Top; 53.67866°N 1.65193°W	—	c. 1769	The lock is on the Calder and Hebble Navigation at the junction of the River Calder with the New Top Cut. It is in stone with coping, and contains two pairs of wooden gates.	II
Double Locks at junction with Dewsbury Cut; 53.67449°N 1.62286°W		c. 1769	The two locks are at the junction of the Calder and Hebble Navigation with the Dewsbury Cut. They are in stone with concrete coping, and between them is an elliptical basin.	II
Lock east of Lodge Farm; 53.66947°N 1.60982°W		c. 1769	The lock on the Calder and Hebble Navigation has stone walls, with some repairs and concrete coping. There are two pairs of wooden gates.	II
Milestone on canal towpath 53.67078°N 1.61350°W		c. 1769	The milestone is on the towpath of the Calder and Hebble Navigation. It consists of a square stone post with a rounded top inscribed with the distance from Fall Ing.	II
Stables east of 17 and 19 Kirkgate, Hanging Heaton; 53.70446°N 1.61366°W	—	Late 18th century	The stables are in stone with stone slate roof, they have one storey and an L-shaped plan. The openings include a blocked cart entry, doorways some of which are blocked, and casement windows.	II
16 and 18 Market Place; 53.69181°N 1.62929°W	—	Late 18th century	A pair of stuccoed shops with a stone slate roof. There are three storeys and four bays, the left two bays projecting under a pediment. The right two bays have a frieze and modillion cornice. In the ground floor are modern shop fronts, and the upper floors contain sash windows.	II
Bottoms Farmhouse; 53.68531°N 1.63207°W	—	Late 18th century	The house is in red brick with stone dressings, quoins, and a stone slate roof with coped gables and cut kneelers. There are two storeys, three bays, an outshut at the rear, and a later two-storey extension at the rear on the left. In the centre is a doorway, and the windows are sashes.	II
Cleggford Bridge; 53.67864°N 1.63688°W		Late 18th century	The bridge, which was widened to the west in the 19th century, carries Thornhill Road (B6117 road) over the River Calder. It is in stone, and consists of five round arches with triangular cutwaters. The bridge has a cast iron balustrade, with round bars and a frieze pierced with quatrefoils and circles, and under it are corbels.	II
26 Bond Street and 9, 11 and 13 Wellington Road East; 53.69216°N 1.63169°W		c. 1800	A group of offices and warehouses in stone with slate roofs, with additions into later in the 19th century. No. 11 Wellington Road is an office with three storeys and two bays. To the left and at an angle is a warehouse with three storeys and three bays, the middle bay containing loading doors, and a Diocletian window in a gable above. To the right is a long range along Wellington Road with four storeys and nine bays. On its right is a curved corner bay, and in Bond Street are blocks of five and four bays, the latter containing a cart entrance.	II
63 Daisy Hill; 53.69110°N 1.63072°W		Late 18th to early 19th century	A house, later a shop and warehouse on a corner site, it is in sandstone, mainly stuccoed, with bracketed eaves, and a hipped sandstone slate roof. There are three storeys and a basement, and a wedge-shaped plan, with two bays on the front, a canted corner on the ground floor, and three bays on the right return. In the ground floor is a modern shop front with a fascia, and the upper floors contain sash windows.	II
Providence Mill; 53.68799°N 1.61012°W		1820	A textile mill complex that was later altered and expanded. It consists of an entrance range, a spinning mill with an attached engine house, boiler house and chimney, and single storey weaving sheds. The buildings are in stone with roofs of slate and stone slate.	II
St Paul's Church, Hanging Heaton; 53.70442°N 1.60901°W		1823–25	A Commissioners' church designed by Thomas Taylor in Gothic Revival style, it was restored and extended in 1893–94 by W. Swinden Barber, and rebuilt following a fire in 1916. The church is built in stone with a slate roof, and consists of a nave, a small chancel and vestries, and a west tower. The tower has three stages, a west arched doorway, a clock face on three sides, and a perforated parapet with octagonal pinnacles.	II
St John's Church, Boothroyd; 53.69198°N 1.65077°W		1823–27	A Commissioners' church designed by Thomas Taylor in Early English style, it is built in stone with a stone slate roof. The church consists of a nave, a short chancel, and a west tower. The tower has four stages, diagonal buttresses, an embattled parapet, and crocketed pinnacles. The windows are two-light lancets with Y-tracery and hood moulds, between them are buttresses rising to gabled pinnacles, and along the top is an embattled parapet.	II
Briestfield Wesleyan Methodist Church; 53.65029°N 1.65471°W	—	1825	A small chapel, later converted for residential use, it is in stone, rendered on the sides and rear, with moulded gutter brackets and a stone slate roof with coped gables. There is one storey at the front, and two at the rear, and a front of three bays. The central doorway and the flanking windows have round-arched heads.	II
85 and 87 Daisy Hill; 53.69087°N 1.63144°W	—	Early 19th century	A stone house in Classical style on a plinth, it has sill bands, an eaves cornice with a blocking course, and a stone slate roof. There are three storeys and a symmetrical front of three bays. In the centre is a doorway, and the windows are sashes, those in the ground floor with cornices, and in the upper floors with grooved lintels.	II
26 Market Place and 1, 3 and 5 Market Street; 53.69153°N 1.62922°W	—	Early 19th century	A shop in stone and in Classical style. There are three storeys, a front of one bay on Market Place, and eight bays along Market Street. On the front is a modern shop front, and above are giant pilasters, a frieze a cornice and a blocking course. The windows are sashes with voussoirs.	II
27 Market Place; 53.69202°N 1.62829°W	—	Early 19th century	A stuccoed shop with a sill band and a hipped slate roof, in Regency style. There are three storeys and one bay. In the ground floor is a modern shop front, and the upper floors are framed by Ionic-style pilasters, an entablature and a blocking course. The windows are casements with flat arches.	II
29 Market Place; 53.69205°N 1.62820°W	—	Early 19th century	A shop on a corner site, it is in stone with a moulded eaves cornice and blocking course, and a hipped slate roof. There are three storeys, three bays on the front, and four on the right return. In the ground floor is a modern shop front, and the windows are casements.	II
30 and 32 Market Place; 53.69156°N 1.62884°W	—	Early 19th century	A house, later divided into two shops, it is in Classical style. The building is in painted stone with sill bands, an eaves cornice and blocking course, and a Welsh slate roof. There are three storeys and two bays. The ground floor contains modern shop fronts, in the upper floors are sash windows with grooved lintels, and over the top windows are blank panels.	II
Boundary stone opposite St Paul's Vicarage; 53.70454°N 1.60786°W	—	c. 1830	The boundary stone is on the footpath on the east side of High Street, and marks with boundary between Dewsbury and Batley. It consists of a stone slab with a rounded top, and is incised with a vertical line flanked by the names of the towns.	II
Eightlands Well Public House; 53.69271°N 1.63295°W	—	Early to mid 19th century	A private house, later a public house, it is in stone on a plinth, with rusticated quoins, an eaves cornice, and a hipped stone slate roof. There are two storeys, five bays, and flanking lower wings. The central doorway has an architrave, a fanlight, a frieze, and a cornice, and the windows are sashes.	II
Central Methodist Church; 53.69126°N 1.63174°W		1839	The church is in stone on a plinth, the ground floor rusticated, with a string course, a frieze, a moulded eaves cornice, and a blocking course with an inscription. There are two storeys, the upper storey flanked by Tuscan pilasters, a front of five bays, and six bays along the sides. All the openings have round heads, and there are two doorways with fanlights in the ground floor. The ground floor windows have aprons, the apron in the central window being a war memorial. Between the windows in the middle bay is an inscribed tablet.	II
Wall, gate piers and railings, Central Methodist Church; 53.69097°N 1.63158°W	—	c. 1839	Enclosing the forecourt to the church are stone walls with spear-headed railings. The square stone gate piers are rusticated in the upper parts and have square caps, and between them are stone steps.	II
152 Bradford Road; 53.69956°N 1.63115°W		c. 1840	A warehouse in stone on a plinth, with quoins, sill bands, moulded eaves, and a hipped Welsh slate roof. There are four storeys and eight bays. The doorway has a fanlight and a flat hood, and the windows are sashes with wedge lintels. At the rear are seven bays, and in the middle bay are taking-in doors.	II
St Mary and St Michael's Church, Whitley Lower; 53.65495°N 1.66471°W		1842–46	The church, designed by Ignatius Bonomi in Neo-Norman style, is built in stone with slate roofs. The church consists of a nave, a chancel, and a west tower. The tower has four stages, a round-arched and decorated west doorway with colonnettes and scalloped capitals, above which is a four-light window, and a squat pyramidal roof. The windows have round arches, and in the east gable end is a wheel window. The nave windows have two lights separated by a mullion, colonnettes with scalloped capitals, and diapering in the tympani, and above them is a saw-tooth corbel table in the eaves.	II
Six-storey building, Batley Carr Mills; 53.69947°N 1.63268°W		1845	The former mill building, later converted for residential use, is in stone, and has a stone slate roof with coped gables. There are six storeys, a front of twelve bays, eleven bays at the rear, and sides of four bays. On the south side are loading bays, the windows are casements, and in the gable end is a Venetian window.	II
St Peter's Parish Centre; 53.68744°N 1.61281°W		1845	A school converted into a church and including a cottage, it is in stone and has a stone slate roof, partly tiled, with coped gables, moulded kneelers, and spear finials. The cottage has two storeys and the main building has one storey. The cottage has three bays and a single-storey extension, and contains a central doorway with a Tudor arched head and two-light windows, all with hood moulds. The main building consists of a long range with a wing to the right. Most windows are mullioned and transomed, and there are three lancet windows. The doorway has Tudor arches and fanlights, and on the front is an inscribed and dated plaque.	II
Railway underbridge, George Street; 53.69019°N 1.63595°W		1845–47	The bridge was built by the Leeds, Dewsbury and Manchester Railway to carry its line over George Street. It consists of a cast iron span carried on sandstone abutments with wrought iron balustrades between end piers.	II
Railway underbridge, Ming Hill; 53.68925°N 1.63741°W	—	1845–47	The bridge was built by the Leeds, Dewsbury and Manchester Railway as an accommodation bridge. It consists of a cast iron span carried on sandstone abutments with wrought iron balustrades between end piers.	II
Railway underbridge, Toad Holes; 53.68762°N 1.63976°W	—	1845–47	The bridge was built by the Leeds, Dewsbury and Manchester Railway as an accommodation bridge. It consists of a cast iron span carried on sandstone abutments with wrought iron balustrades between end pillars. The wing walls are curved and raked, and the abutments have a moulded cornice.	II
Railway underbridge, Thornhill Lane; 53.68606°N 1.64139°W	—	Mid-1840s	The bridge was built by the Leeds, Dewsbury and Manchester Railway as an accommodation bridge. It is in sandstone, and consists of a single semicircular arch with rusticated voussoirs, and impost bands. Above the arch is a string course and a blocking course. The wing walls are curving and ramped, with plain coping, and end in pilaster strips.	II
Wood Lane Bridge; 53.69864°N 1.62982°W	—	Mid-1840s	The bridge was built by the Leeds, Dewsbury and Manchester Railway, it carries a footpath over the line, and is in sandstone. The bridge consists of a single segmental arch with rusticated voussoirs, quoined jambs, and an impost band. Above the arch is a string course, and a parapet with rounded coping.	II
Railway Bridge over Calder and Hebble Navigation; 53.67890°N 1.65020°W		1847	The bridge was built for the London and North Western Railway to carry its line over the Long Cut of the Calder and Hebble Navigation. It consists if a single cast iron span on rusticated stone abutments. There are six arched girders, the spandrels forming a Gothic arcade, and the outer girders inscribed. On the top are Gothic arcaded parapets.	II
Railway Bridge over River Calder; 53.68081°N 1.64778°W		1847	The bridge was built for the London and North Western Railway to carry its line over the River Calder. It consists of two cast iron spans on rusticated stone abutments and a central pier. There are six arched girders, the spandrels forming a Gothic arcade, and the outer girders inscribed. On the top are Gothic arcaded parapets.	II
St Matthew's Church; 53.68697°N 1.64233°W		1847–48	The church was designed by Ignatius Bonomi and Cory in Decorated style, a chapel was added in 1898, and the church has been converted for residential use. It is built in stone with a stone slate roof, and consists of a nave with a clerestory, north and south aisles, a south porch, a chancel with a south chapel and a north vestry, and a west tower. The tower is squat, without buttresses, and has a stair turret and a stepped embattled parapet. The east window is transomed, and has 14 lights.	II
Dewsbury railway station 53.69205°N 1.63309°W		1848	The station was built for the London and North Western Railway, it is in stone with slate roofs, and in Tudor style. The entrance block has two storeys and four bays, Tudor arched entrances in the outer bays, mullioned and transomed windows between, and sash windows above. In front is a glass canopy and sides on dwarf walls. Inside are platform buildings with glass canopies on cast iron columns, and a covered footbridge. To the left is the former stationmaster's house, later a public house, with five bays, two storeys in the middle bay with a shaped gable, flanked by single-storey bays with shaped parapets, and recessed single-storey bays. The building contains mullioned and transomed windows.	II
Railway viaduct 53.69479°N 1.63075°W		c. 1848	The viaduct was built for the London and North Western Railway. It is in stone, and consists of ten round arches and one elliptical arch on a curving plan. The viaduct has a moulded cornice and parapet, rusticated vaults and voussoirs, and massive moulded bases to the piers.	II
Toll Gates; 53.70694°N 1.59991°W	—	c. 1850	The toll gate was built on the turnpike road from Dewsbury to Leeds. It consists of two pairs of circular cast iron posts with conical tops, and between the outer posts are panels in wrought iron in a lattice pattern.	II
150 Bradford Road; 53.69936°N 1.63117°W	—	Mid 19th century	A warehouse in stone on a plinth, with quoins, sill bands, and a Welsh slate roof. There are three storeys and a front of twelve bays, with a pediment over the middle two bays. On the front are three doorways with moulded surrounds, pilasters, fanlights and flat hoods, and the windows are sashes with rusticated voussoirs, and panelled aprons. At the rear are sets of taking-in doors.	II
Barn southeast of 17 and 19 Kirkgate, Hanging Heaton; 53.70417°N 1.61379°W	—	Mid 19th century	The barn is in stone with quoins, and a stone slate roof with coped gables. The front facing the street contains a segmental-headed cart entry with a keystone, and square and round-headed openings.	II
15, 17, 19 and 21 Market Place; 53.69201°N 1.62857°W	—	Mid 19th century	A row of shops in Italianate palazzo style. They are in stone with vermiculated quoins, sill bands, an entablature and a blocking course. There are three storeys and four bays. In the ground floor are modern shop fronts, each middle floor window has an architrave, a pulvinated frieze, and a cornice, and the windows in the top floor have segmental heads and bracketed sills.	II
22 Wellington Road; 53.69142°N 1.63265°W	—	Mid 19th century	An office block in stone with vermiculated quoins and dressings in the ground floor, an eaves cornice, and a hipped slate roof. There are two storeys and a symmetrical front of five bays. The central porch protrudes slightly and contains a doorway with a semicircular fanlight flanked by small round-arched niches, and the windows are casements.	II
Coach House, Crow Nest House; 53.68825°N 1.64831°W	—	Mid 19th century	The former coach house in Crow Nest Park is in stone, and has hipped slate roof. There is a single storey, a main range and two projecting wings. The main range contains three elliptical-arched carriage entrances, with an oculus over each outer entrance and a square window over the central one. In each wing are two entrances and a central window.	II
17 Wellington Road; 53.69140°N 1.63227°W		c. 1850	A warehouse on a corner site in buff sandstone on a plinth, with a sill band, a modillion eaves cornice, and a slate roof. There are three storeys and a basement, and sides of ten bays with a curved bay on the corner. The main entrance is on the corner and has Doric columns, and an entablature with triglyphs, metopes, paterae and guttae. Above it are windows with architraves, that in the middle floor with a cornice. The other ground floor openings are arched and have quoined surrounds. The windows are sashes, some horizontally-sliding, and in the upper floors they have flat heads.	II
Holy Innocents Church, Thornhill Lees; 53.67884°N 1.63552°W		1855–58	The church, which is in Decorated style, is built in stone with a slate roof. It consists of a nave with a clerestory, north and south aisles, a south porch, a chancel with a south vestry, and a west steeple. The steeple has a three-stage tower with angle buttresses, clock faces, a parapet pierced with trefoils, octagonal pinnacles and gargoyles, and it is surmounted by a broach spire with two tiers of lucarnes. The west window has three lights, and the east window has five.	II
Thornhill Lees Vicarage; 53.67835°N 1.63568°W	—	1855–58	The vicarage is in stone with buttresses, a string course, and a slate roof. There are two storeys, the fronts are asymmetrical, and the windows are mullioned and transomed. In the centre of the entrance front is an arched porch with a chamfered surround. The garden front has a projecting gabled bay on the left, with a canted bay window in the ground floor and a square bay window above.	II
Barclays Bank; 53.69189°N 1.62741°W		1856–58	The bank, which is in Italianate palazzo style, is in stone, with the ground floor rusticated and vermiculated. Over the ground floor and at the eaves are moulded and dentilled cornices. There are three storeys, a front of six bays, the left bay recessed, and three bays on the right return. The doorways are in the outer bays, and the ground floor windows are round-arched; all the ground floor openings have rusticated voussoirs, Ionic colonnettes, and keystones with carved heads. In the middle floor, each window has a cambered head, and an open segmental pediment on decorative consoles, and the top floor windows have square heads and shouldered architraves. On the ground floor side windows are wrought iron railings, and in front of the building are bulbous iron railings with pointed finials.	II
HSBC Bank; 53.69195°N 1.62935°W		1857–59	The bank, which is in Italianate style, is in stone, the lower two storeys rusticated, with a moulded eaves cornice on paired consoles, a balustraded parapet with urns and dies, and a hipped pantile roof. There are three storeys and four bays, the bays are separated by rusticated pilasters, there is an entablature on each floor, and each bay contains two windows. In the outer bays are doorways, the left one with a segmental pediment on decorative consoles. The ground floor windows have segmental heads, and all the openings on the ground floor have elongated keystones. The windows in the middle floor have round heads and spandrels carved with foliage and human and rams' heads, and the top floor windows have segmental heads.	II
Gates and gate piers, Holy Innocents Church; 53.67861°N 1.63554°W	—	1858	The gate piers are in stone, they are square and reducing in height, with steeply gabled caps.	II
Sundial, Holy Innocents Church; 53.67874°N 1.63532°W	—	c. 1858	The sundial is in the churchyard to the south of the church. It is in stone, and consists of an octagonal column with a foliated capital, on an octagonal slab and an octagonal base. On the top is a circular brass plate and a long gnomon.	II
Thornhill Lees School; 53.67799°N 1.63602°W	—	1858	The school is in stone, and has a slate roof with a bellcote. There is a single storey and a symmetrical front, with a central range of seven bays and flanking cross-wings, and a later extension in front of the left wing. Steps lead up to a central doorway, and the second and fifth bays are gabled and contain mullioned and transomed windows. The windows in the cross-wings have four lights, over which is a tympanum with a circular window containing a six-pointed star.	II
House south of Thornhill Lees School; 53.67767°N 1.63593°W		c. 1858	A school with a schoolmaster's house at the rear, later used for other purposes, it is in stone, and has slate roofs with coped gables, cut kneelers, and decorative wrought iron finials. The school has one storey and the house has two, and the school consists of a central range with gabled cross-wings. Steps lead up to the porch that has a moulded cusped arch and engaged colonnettes with foliate capitals. To the left of the porch is a six-light mullioned window with round-headed lights. In each gable end is a three-light window with an arched hood, the tympanum decorated, and above is a coat of arms.	II
Gates and gate piers, Thornhill Lees Vicarage; 53.67851°N 1.63556°W	—	c. 1858	The gate piers are in stone, they are square and reducing in height, with steeply gabled caps.	II
County Court Building; 53.69249°N 1.63333°W		1858–60	The building is in stone, the front is rusticated, alternate courses in the ground floor are vermiculated, and there is a dentilled cornice over the ground floor, a plain cornice over the upper floor, a broad eaves cornice on long consoles, and a hipped slate roof. There are two storeys and an attic, a front of six bays, three bays on the sides, and a lower two-bay extension at the rear. The doorway to the left has a segmental head and a fanlight, and above it is a Royal coat of arms. The ground floor windows have segmental heads, architraves, keystones, aprons, and a sill band on consoles, and above them is an inscribed frieze. In the upper floor are round-headed windows with pilaster jambs and guilloché decoration, and in the attic are small rectangular windows. The rear extension has a two-bay arcaded portico.	II
Gate piers and gates, Dewsbury Cemetery; 53.68635°N 1.64881°W	—	1859	Flanking the entrance to the drive are tall octagonal stone piers, on a moulded double plinth, each with a gabled buttress on each front, and surmounted by an octagonal stone spire with a finial. Outside the pedestrian gates are shorter piers, also with gabled buttresses and moulded double plinths, and with banded pyramidal that have lucarnes and finials. The gates are in cast iron and in Gothic style.	II
North Chapel, Dewsbury Cemetery; 53.68632°N 1.64945°W		1859	The former Non-Conformist chapel, now derelict, is in stone, and has a slate roof with coped gables, cross finials, and ornate ridge tiles. There is a cruciform plan, with a projecting porch, north and south wings, and a rear wing, all gabled. In the porch is a moulded arched entrance with a hood mould, over which is a triangular opening containing a circular cusped window, and the porch is flanked by lancet windows.	II
South Chapel, Dewsbury Cemetery; 53.68603°N 1.64919°W	—	1859	The former Church of England chapel, now ruinous, is in stone, and has a slate roof with coped gables, cross finials, and ornate ridge tiles. There is a cruciform plan, with a projecting porch, north and south wings, and a rear wing, all gabled. In the porch is a moulded arched entrance with a hood mould, over which is a triangular opening containing a circular cusped window, and the porch is flanked by lancet windows.	II
23 Bradford Road; 53.69551°N 1.63169°W	—	c. 1860	A stone warehouse, the ground floor rusticated, with quoins in the upper floors, moulded bands between the floors, a moulded eaves cornice, and a slate roof. There are three storeys and a front of three bays. The ground floor openings have round heads with vermiculated keystones, the central doorway has a fanlight, and the flanking windows have aprons. The middle floor contains three sash windows, the middle window with a segmental pediment and the outer windows with cornices, and in the top floor are paired round-headed sash windows.	II
25 Bradford Road; 53.69565°N 1.63166°W	—	c. 1860	A stone warehouse on a moulded plinth, with rusticated quoins and a dentilled eaves cornice. There are three storeys and three bays. In the centre is a doorway, and above are loading doors, all with segmental heads. The outer bays contain sash windows with moulded surrounds and keystones, in the ground floor with round heads, and in the upper floors with segmental heads.	II
21 Wellington Road; 53.69122°N 1.63235°W	—	c. 1860	A warehouse in buff sandstone with floor bands, a moulded eaves cornice and a modern roof. There are three storeys at the front, four at the rear, and two bays. In the right bay is an arched doorway, and to its left is a pair of arched casement windows with moulded surrounds, capitals and keystones. The middle floor contains casement windows with moulded sills and flat hoods, and in the top floor are sash windows with segmental heads.	II
128 Bradford Road; 53.69819°N 1.63132°W		1861	A stone warehouse that has sill bands, bracketed eaves, and a hipped Welsh slate roof. There are four storeys and a basement, a front of three bays, seven bays along the sides, and a three-bay extension on the left at the rear. The central round-headed window is flanked by panelled pilasters with rusticated plinths and moulded heads, above it is a circular cusped window, and a keystone carved with a head. The round-headed windows in the outer bays have two round-headed lights with a column between and a roundel above. The windows in the first floor have round heads, those in the first floor with keystones, and the basement windows and those in the top floor have segmental heads. The windows along the sides have flat heads, and the middle bay of the extension contains taking-in doors.	II
St Mark's Church; 53.69721°N 1.63922°W		1862–65	The church, later used as a school, is in Decorated style, and is built in stone with slate roofs. It has a cruciform plan, consisting of a nave with a clerestory, north and south aisles, a south porch, north and south transepts, a chancel with a north chapel and vestry, and a southwest steeple. The steeple has a four-stage tower, angle buttresses, a stair turret on the southwest, and a broach spire with two tiers of lucarnes.	II
23 and 25 Wellington Road; 53.69112°N 1.63247°W		Early 1860s	A pair of warehouses, later converted into apartments, in buff sandstone, the ground floor rusticated, with quoins, sill bands, and a hipped slate roof. There are three storeys and a basement, and an entrance front of four bays. The ground floor openings are arched and have keystones with carved heads. In the second bay is a doorway, the third bay has been converted from a doorway and windows inserted, and the outer bays contain windows with moulded aprons, and segmental arched basement windows. The windows in the upper floors have architraves, those in the middle floor with keystones. The south front is angled, it has four storeys and five bays, and contains taking-in doors.	II
Former Salem Methodist Church; 53.69342°N 1.63037°W		1863	The church, later a mosque, is in stone and has two storeys and a basement. There are five bays, the middle three bays projecting under a pediment that has carving and a dated central roundel in the tympanum. This is flanked by a balustraded parapet with urns. The basement windows have square heads, and the windows in the upper floors have round heads. The ground floor windows have decorated aprons, and the upper floor windows have pointed hood moulds and balustrades. Between the floors is a cornice, and at the top is a dentiled cornice. To the left steps lead up to a doorway with a cambered head, there are six bays on the sides and four at the rear, the middle two bays projecting under a pediment.	II
St Saviour's Church, Ravensthorpe; 53.67871°N 1.66398°W		1863–64	The church was originally designed by John Cory in Gothic Revival style, and was completed in 1899–1900 by C. Hodgson Fowler. It is in stone, the west part of the roof is slated, and the east part is tiled. The church consists of a nave, a south aisle of similar size, a north porch. a chancel with north and south transepts, and a small square northwest tower with an octagonal open bellcote. The west window has three lights, the east window has five, and in the south transept is a wheel window.	II
7 Wellington Road East and Croft Road; 53.69265°N 1.63100°W		Mid to late 19th century	A warehouse and offices, the building is in stone with a rusticated ground floor, quoins, sill bands, a bracketed eaves cornice, and slate roofs. There are three storeys and a basement, eleven bays along Wellington Road, eight on Croft Road, and one curved bay in the acute angle between them. In the curved bay is a round-arched doorway with a moulded surround. There are two basement doorways on Wellington Road, a taking-in door on Croft Road, and the other openings are windows. Those in the basement have segmental heads, in the ground floor they have round heads, in the middle floor flat heads and moulded surrounds, and in the top floor the windows have segmental heads.	II
27 and 29 Wellington Road and 8–16 Nelson Street; 53.69092°N 1.63250°W		1868	A warehouse on a corner site, later incorporating shops, and in the late 20th century converted into apartments. It is in buff sandstone with a slate roof, three storeys and a basement on Wellington Street, and four storeys on Nelson Street. There are six bays on Wellington Street, nine on Nelson Street, and three curved bays on the corner. Features include gableted turrets on twisted colonnettes, and on the corner is a roundel with a hood mould.	II
120 Huddersfield Road; 53.68741°N 1.64161°W		1871	The minister's house for St Paulinius' Church, it was designed by E. W. Pugin. It is in stone with string courses and a slate roof, hipped on the left. Most of the windows have arched lights and hood moulds, and there is a gabled dormer. At the rear are four storeys and two bays, the left bay gabled, and the right bay recessed with cross windows.	II
St Paulinius' Church; 53.68758°N 1.64123°W		1871	A Roman Catholic church designed by E. W. Pugin in Gothic Revival style, it is built in stone with a slate roof. It consists of a nave and a chancel under a single roof with a clerestory, the chancel has a polygonal apse and a porch. On the south side is an aisle, and to the left is a small baptistry. Most of the windows are lancets, and in the baptistry is a rose window.	II
Dewsbury Baptist Church; 53.69237°N 1.62599°W		1871	The church, which was extended in 1923, is in Gothic Revival style, and is built in stone with a slate roof. It has a buttressed nave with gabled bays, dormers and cast iron finials. At the entrance is a three-bay arcaded and gabled porch that has red granite columns with foliated capitals. To the right is a steeple with a square tower and a broach spire with lucarnes, and to the left is a squat square tower with a hipped roof. Further to the left is a single-storey hall with a three-arched porch.	II
3 Wellington Street; 53.69107°N 1.63218°W		1872	A warehouse in buff sandstone, with a hipped slate roof, flat and leaded in the centre. There are five storeys and an irregular pentagonal plan. The entrance front has a rusticated ground floor and five bays. Above the ground and first floors are bracketed cornices, and the upper floors have sill bands. In the right bay is an arched doorway, to its left are two replacement windows and a wide modern entrance, and the windows above are sashes. The window over the doorway has a shouldered architrave, and above it is foliate carving and a cartouche. The windows in the first floor have shouldered architraves, those in the third and top floors have segmental heads and in the fourth floor they have flat heads.	II
2–6 Nelson Street and 1 and 1a Wellington Street; 53.69089°N 1.63214°W		1873	A warehouse on a corner site, with offices and shops, converted into apartments in the late 20th century. It is in buff sandstone, with floor bands, eaves on moulded corbels, and a slate roof. There are four storeys, five bays on Nelson Street, four on Wellington Street, and a narrow bay on the corner, quoined at the angles. The corner bay contains a doorway with a fanlight and a shouldered lintel, above which is a blind gabled arch on twisted colonnettes, the tympanum containing a monogram. Over this is a blind window, a quatrefoil with the date, and a stepped cap. In the ground floor are replacement shop fronts, and the upper floors contain sash windows, some with single lights, others with three lights arranged as Venetian windows.	II
Westborough Methodist Church; 53.69805°N 1.64936°W		1874–76	The church is in Decorated style, and is built in stone with a slate roof. It consists of a nave, a gabled south porch, shallow north and south transepts, and a northwest steeple. The steeple has a tower with three stages, a corbel table, and an octagonal splay-footed spire with four lucarnes. The windows on the sides of the church are lancets, and in the transepts are wheel windows.	II
21 Bond Street; 53.69199°N 1.63152°W	—	Late 19th century	An office building in stone on a plinth, with a rusticated ground floor, and a cornice between each floor and at the eaves. There are four storeys and four bays. The ground floor openings are round-headed with keystones carved as heads, the doorway has a fanlight, and the windows have decorated aprons. The upper floor windows have vermiculated keystones, the first floor windows have elliptical heads and those above have segmental heads.	II
23 Bond Street; 53.69196°N 1.63171°W	—	Late 19th century	An office building in stone, with a cornice between each floor, pilaster strips between the bays, and a moulded eaves cornice on paired brackets. There are three storeys and a basement, and seven bays. The doorway has a segmental-headed fanlight, and a segmental pediment on decorative consoles, the tympanum containing a carved shield and foliage decoration. The windows have vermiculated keystones and aprons, those in the ground and top floors with segmental-arched heads, and in the middle floor with round-arched heads.	II
53, 55 and 57 Branch Road; 53.69281°N 1.63031°W		Late 19th century	A row of three houses in stone, with hipped slate roofs and two storeys. At the right, in No. 57 is an elliptical-arched carriage entrance, and all the other ground floor openings have triangular pediments. No. 57 has two bays, the left bay containing a doorway flanked by single lights with a transom and three single lights above. No. 55 is taller, with a bracketed and moulded eaves cornice, four bays, a doorway on the left, and sash windows, flat-headed in the ground floor and round-headed in the upper floor. No. 53 has two bays, a doorway and sash windows.	II
18 and 20 Corporation Street; 53.69254°N 1.62839°W	—	Late 19th century	A shop and offices in stone, with a bracketed eaves cornice, and a hipped slate roof. There are four storeys, four bays on the front, and two on the left return. In the ground floor are modern shop fronts, and the upper floors contain sash windows with moulded segmental heads.	II
15 Wellington Road; 53.69186°N 1.63203°W		Late 19th century	A commercial building angled round a corner site, in Italianate style, it is in stone with rusticated quoins, sill bands, and a bracketed eaves cornice and blocking course. There are four storeys and 14 bays. The doorway has a concave surround, and the ground floor windows have round arches, voussoirs, and vermiculated keystones. The windows in the first floor have architraves, pulvinated friezes, and triangular pediments, in the second floor they have square heads, friezes, and cornices, and in the top floor cambered heads, architraves with chambranles, and a cornice.	II
Boothroyd Gate, Crow Nest Park; 53.69099°N 1.64848°W	—	Late 19th century	At the entrance to the park are two pairs of square stone gate piers. Each pier has a large square base, and is panelled, with a segmental pedimented cap surmounted by a decorative wrought iron lamp bracket. Between the piers are decorative iron gates, double in the centre and pedestrian gates between the outer piers.	II
Burgh Lane Gate, Crow Nest Park; 53.68813°N 1.65084°W	—	Late 19th century	At the entrance to the park are two pairs of square stone gate piers. Each pier has a large square base, and is panelled, with a segmental pedimented cap surmounted by a decorative wrought iron lamp bracket. Between the piers are decorative iron gates, double in the centre and pedestrian gates between the outer piers.	II
West Town Gate, Crow Nest Park; 53.68753°N 1.64484°W		Late 19th century	At the main entrance to the park are two pairs of square stone gate piers. Each pier has a moulded square base, and is panelled, with a segmental pedimented cap on a cove cornice, surmounted by a decorative wrought iron lamp bracket. Between the piers are decorative iron gates, double in the centre and pedestrian gates between the outer piers.	II
Station Hotel; 53.69350°N 1.62773°W		Late 19th century	A hotel, later a public house, it is in Baroque style, and built in stone with a top cornice and a slate roof. The main block is pedimented and has three storeys and three bays, to the right is a single-storey four-bay curved wing, and to the left is a two-storey four-bay extension. The central doorway has a fanlight, above it is a panelled frieze with an inscription, and all the windows are sashes. The middle floor windows each has a architrave, a pulvinated frieze and a cornice, and the windows in the top floor have coved architraves, bulbous keystones and serpentine sills on curved brackets.	II
Lych gate and front wall, St Michael's Church; 53.66557°N 1.61761°W		c. 1877	The wall at the front of the churchyard is in stone, and is panelled with triangular copings. The lych gate has a stone base, a timber superstructure, and a pitched slate roof. There are two pairs of pairs of squat chamfered stone gate piers.	II
Bridge over Calder and Hebble Navigation; 53.67865°N 1.62200°W		1878	The bridge carries Bretton Street over the Calder and Hebble Navigation. It has dated wrought iron beams giving a flat span, and railings with Gothic arcading. The sides are in stone with a string course, parapets with rounded copings, and round end piers. Over the towpath is a round-arched vaulted passage with cut voussoirs.	II
Former Fox's auctioneers, gate piers and paving 53.69153°N 1.63090°W		1878	The building, originally an auction house, it was later extended and used as a factory, and is in yellow sandstone and brick, with slate roofs. It consists of a saleroom block and an extension, linked by a bridge to a stable block. The saleroom block has two storeys and three bays, a cornice over the ground floor, a sill band, and a hipped roof. The ground floor openings have round heads, the left is a doorway. To the right is an extension with a single-storey extension over a basement, with eight bays. The stable block has two storeys and two bays, and in the stable yard is paving with flags and setts, and square stone gate piers.	II
Former Co-Operative Society Building (Pioneer House); 53.69301°N 1.63019°W		1878–80	The building is built in sandstone with slate roofs, and was extended in 1896 and 1914. The first two phases are in Italian Renaissance style with three storeys and 16 bays, and the 1914 phase is in Baroque style with two storeys and four bays. In the ground floor are shop fronts, and the upper floors contain windows of various types. At the southeastern end is a clock tower with a domed top, a lantern and a finial, and at the northwestern end is a smaller tower.	II
Former Eastborough County School, gatepiers, gates and railings 53.69320°N 1.62543°W		1879	The former school is in stone with a slate roof, and in Gothic Revival style. There is a front of 13 bays, four of the bays gabled, and the right two bays form gabled cross-wings. The third bay has an octagonal tower containing a cartouche, and with louvred bell openings and an octagonal spire. This bay and the cross-wings contain entrances with red granite colonnettes, a moulded arch with a decorated tympanum, and an inscribed tablet. Enclosing the grounds is a dwarf wall with cast iron railings and three pairs of square gabled gate piers with conical caps.	II
24 Bond Street and 19 Croft Street; 53.69215°N 1.63126°W		c. 1880	A warehouse and offices, the fronts in stone and the side walls in brick, with moulded cornices between the floors, and a slate roof with coped gables. The Bond Street front has four storeys and a basement, and four bays. The basement and ground floor are rusticated and contain a round-headed doorway. The windows are sashes with keystones, in the basement and first floor with segmental heads, in the ground and second floors with round heads, and in the top floor with flat heads. The Croft Street Front has four storeys and five bays, quoins, and a rusticated ground floor containing a segmental-arched cart entry and a round-headed doorway. The arrangement of windows is similar to the Bond Street front.	II
41 (formerly 43) Bradford Road; 53.69649°N 1.63168°W		c. 1880	A warehouse, later used for other purposes, it is in stone on a plinth, with a moulded eaves band, and a hipped Welsh slate roof. There are three storeys and a basement, three bays on the front, and seven bays along the left return. In the centre of the front is a segmental-headed doorway with a fanlight, flanked by segmental-headed basement doorways. The windows are sashes, in the ground floor they have round heads and keystones, and in the other floors segmental heads. The windows on the front and the first bay of the return have bracketed sills, the left bay in the return contains a taking-in door in each storey, and most of the windows in the top floor are blocked.	II
43-45 (formerly 45) Bradford Road; 53.69655°N 1.63184°W		c. 1880	A warehouse, later used for other purposes, it is in stone on a plinth, with sill bands, a bracketed eaves band, and a hipped Welsh slate roof. There are three storeys and a front of five bays, The outer bays each contains a round-headed doorway with a moulded surround, a fanlight, and a bracketed keystone. Between them is a triple arched window containing round-arched sashes with a moulded impost, and moulded arches with roundels. In the middle floor are round headed windows, and the windows in the top floor have flat heads.	II
3 and 5 Wellington Road; 53.69275°N 1.63079°W		c. 1880	A warehouse and office on a corner site, it is in stone with a slate roof, and is in Italianate style. There are four storeys and a basement, six bays on Wellington Road, five bays to the left on the curved corner, nine bays on Branch Road, and six bays on Croft Road. Between the floors are cornices, the windows, apart from those in the curved corner, are round-headed in the lower two floors, segmental-headed in the second floor, and flat-headed in the top floor, and on the roof are ball finials. The doorway in the centre of the corner has a round head, a moulded surround, a fanlight, and a keystone. Above is it a Venetian window with a pediment over the middle light, the flanking windows have laurel wreaths carved above them, and at the top is an inscribed segmental pediment.	II
Municipal Buildings; 53.69623°N 1.63562°W		1881–83	Originally Dewsbury Infirmary, the building is in stone with hipped slate roofs, and is in Gothic Revival style. The main block has a T-shaped plan and there is a long wing to the right ending in square towers. The front has two storeys and an attic, and five bays, the outer bays gabled, and the central bay a clock tower containing an entrance flanked by buttresses and with a moulded cambered head. Above it is a canted oriel window, on the roof of which is a niche containing a statue. Over this are three crocketed gables, a four-light window, and a decorative corbel table. On the top is a pavilion roof with a clock face, a gabled dormer, and pinnacles. The left return has five bays, a gabled entrance and a glass canopy.	II
United Reformed Church; 53.69091°N 1.62828°W	—	1882–84	The church, which is in Decorated style, is built in stone with a Westmorland slate roof, and has two storeys. On the front are four bays, the middle two bays projecting under a gable, and flanked by buttresses rising to turrets. In the centre is an elaborate gabled portal with an arched entrance, and flanked by three grey granite colonnettes. In the tympanum of the arch is a carving of the Resurrection. Along the sides of the church are six gabled bays divided by buttresses, and in front of the church are steps flanked by walls and elaborate piers.	II
Town Hall, including Magistrates' Court; 53.69157°N 1.62697°W		1886–89	The town hall, which incorporates magistrates' courts, is in stone, the ground floor vermiculated, the middle floor rusticated, and it has slate roofs with a balustraded parapet. There are three storeys and attics, and a symmetrical front of seven bays, the outer bays curved. The middle bay projects, and steps lead up to an entrance in the middle floor that has a portico with paired Ionic columns, and a full dentilled entablature with a balcony above. The upper floor is similar and has a triangular pediment, the tympanum containing coat of arms. Above this rises a two-stage clock tower, the lower stage with an arched opening flanked by paired Composite columns, and with a pediment and urns at the corners. The top stage contains the clock and above it is a dome and a cupola. On the corners of the building are double pavilion roofs with segmental dormers and surmounted by iron crests. The windows in the ground floor have square heads and in the upper floors they are round-headed.	II*
Dewsbury Library; 53.69042°N 1.63367°W		1894–96	The library is in stone on a chamfered plinth, with pilasters, gables containing crests and with finials, and a hipped roof surmounted by an octagonal lead-clad cupola. There are two storeys and an asymmetrical front of six bays. The left two bays have gables, and contain flat-headed windows in the ground floor and round-headed windows above. To the right is a bay containing the entrance with a moulded surround, an open segmental pediment containing an inscribed panel, and iron gates over which is a three-light fanlight. Further to the right are three bays, the outer ones with shaped gables, each containing a large round-arched window in the ground floor and small windows above, and to the right of the building is a small round turret.	II
14 and 16 Corporation Street; 53.69247°N 1.62860°W	—	1899	A row of shops forming the northern entrance to The Arcade, they are in stone with a stone slate roof, and are in Renaissance style. There are three storeys and attics, and three bays, the outer bays with pedimented shaped gables and finials. In the centre is the round-arched entrance with an inscribed tablet above, and over that a cross window. Flanking the entrance are modern shop fronts, above them, in the middle floor are canted transomed oriel windows, the top floor contains transomed windows, and in the attics are cross windows.	II
23 and 25 Market Place; 53.69204°N 1.62841°W		1899 (probable)	A row of shops forming the southern entrance to The Arcade, they are in stone with a stone slate roof, and are in Renaissance style. There are three storeys and attics, and three bays, the outer bays with pedimented shaped gables and finials. In the centre is the round-arched entrance with an inscribed tablet above, and over that a cross window. Flanking the entrance are modern shop fronts, above them, in the middle floor are canted transomed oriel windows, the top floor contains transomed windows, and in the attics are cross windows.	II
1–22 The Arcade; 53.69230°N 1.62853°W		1899	A shopping arcade with shops on each side, it has a glazed roof with decorative cast iron frames, and there are two storeys. In the ground floor are shop fronts, some contemporary and others modern, and in the upper floor canted oriel windows alternate with sash windows.	II
South African War Memorial; 53.68809°N 1.64626°W		c. 1902	The memorial in Crow Nest Park commemorates those lost in the South African War. It consists of a bronze statue of a life-size soldier holding a rifle. The statue stands on a square stepped base of red granite, and on the sides are bronze plaques with the names of those lost.	II
The Black Bull Public House; 53.69203°N 1.62886°W		Early 20th century	The public house, curving round a corner site, is in Arts and Crafts style, and built in stone with a tile roof. There are two storeys, a front of three bays, and a further bay canted to the right. Above the central doorway is a cartouche, in the ground floor are square bay windows, and the outer upper floor windows that rise to break through the eaves as hipped dormers. On the corner, the upper floor overhangs, with the corbel carved as a grotesque.	II
World War Memorial; 53.69055°N 1.64862°W		1923–24	The memorial to the two World Wars is in Crow Nest Park. It consists of a circular stone two-stage tower with eight giant square columns carrying a deep frieze and a blocking course inscribed with the names of battles in the First World War. Inside the upper stage is a tripod with a central column on round, stepped podium. The tower stands on a stepped base, and between the columns in the lower stage are bronze plaques inscribed with the names of those lost in the First World War. On the base are plaques with the names of those lost in the Second World War.	II
Telephone Kiosk outside Salem Methodist Church; 53.69326°N 1.63024°W		1935	The telephone kiosk is of the K6 type, designed by Giles Gilbert Scott. Constructed in cast iron with a square plan and a dome, it has three unperforated crowns in the top panels.	II
Telephone Kiosk outside the Town Hall; 53.69167°N 1.62648°W	—	1935	The telephone kiosk is of the K6 type, designed by Giles Gilbert Scott. Constructed in cast iron with a square plan and a dome, it has three unperforated crowns in the top panels.	II
Pair of telephone kiosks, Market Place; 53.69184°N 1.62845°W		1935	The telephone kiosks are of the K6 type, designed by Giles Gilbert Scott. Constructed in cast iron with a square plan and a dome, they have three unperforated crowns in the top panels.	II
