= Westborough High School, Dewsbury =

Westborough High School

Location
- Stockhill Street; Dewsbury, West Yorkshire, WF13 2JE; England; 53.6933°N 1.6473°W

Information
- Type: Foundation school
- Local authority: Kirklees
- Department for Education URN: 107775 Tables
- Ofsted: Reports
- Headteacher: Jennifer Napper
- Gender: Mixed
- Age: 11 to 16
- Website: http://www.w-h-s.org.uk/

Westborough High School is a mixed secondary school located in Westborough, Dewsbury, West Yorkshire, England. It is situated on Oxford Road, and shares its grounds with St John Fisher Catholic High School. The school was founded in the 1960s and has had close links with the other nearby secondary schools. The current (2013) headteacher of Westborough is Jennifer Napper

The school admits pupils from the ages of 11–16. Its catchment areas are Ravensthorpe, Savile Town and the local areas of Boothroyd.

Over the past 5 years the school's music department, in the new performing arts block at Westborough, has developed a public profile with concerts performed by pupils in the summer and winter. Bands originating at Westborough are the Samba Band and Drumline, which have performed in Batley Park, York and on Sky TV during a rugby match.

Westborough High School achieved the third successive year of record rises in GCSE results, with 54% of pupils gaining 5 or more GCSE passes at A* to C, and 34% of these being in English and Maths, a 6% rise on last year, exceeding a 30% target set by the Government.

In 2011 Birkdale High School was formally closed, with Westborough High School taking over its site. Some pupils from Birkdale transferred to the Westborough campus immdemiately. However the former Birkdale High School campus was still used to educate a number of pupils under Westborough High School management, and renamed as the Halifax Road Campus. The Halifax Road Campus closed down when the final set of year 11 students finished their GCSEs in 2014.
