= Birkdale High School =

Secondary school in West Yorkshire, England

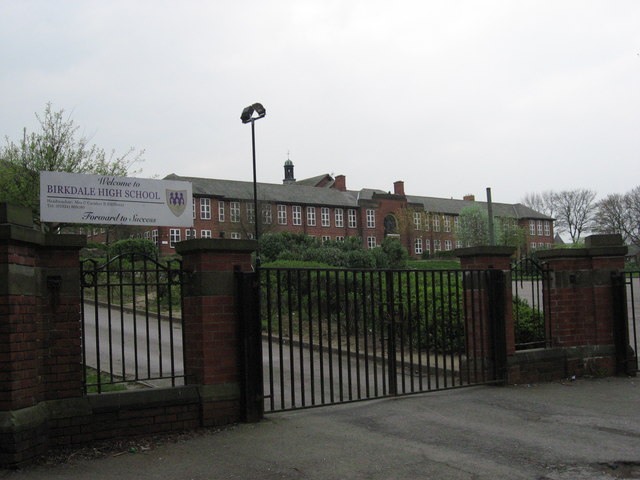

Location
- Wheelwright Drive; Dewsbury, West Yorkshire, WF13 4JB; England
- 53.69986°N 1.64696°W

Information
- Motto: Forward to Success
- Closed: 2011
- Local authority: Kirklees
- Department for Education URN: 107774 Tables
- Ofsted: Reports
- Age: 11 to 16
- Website: www.birkdalehigh.org.uk/

Birkdale High School was a secondary school located in Kirklees, West Yorkshire, England.

== History ==
The school's buildings were constructed in two distinct phases; the older building, comprising mainly the former Wheelwright Grammar School for Girls and a newly built wing connected by a bridge c. 1980. The school was set amongst grassed grounds with a large playing and track area and more secluded grassed quadrangles located within the main building.

The school was located on Wheelwright Drive. near the Dewsbury/Batley border. The intake of the school was reflected by the surrounding area, most pupils were taken from the Batley/Dewsbury area due to the school's central location and its position on many bus routes through the surrounding towns. The school had a slightly higher male population due to the presence of an all-girls school in the school's catchment area as noted by OFSTED. The school became quite small in the years before closure, with just under 600 pupils in 2006/7. In May 2015 the CBBC show Hank Zipzer was filmed at the closed school premises after production was relocated from St Catherine's Catholic High School to Birkdale for Series 3 and onwards. The main entrance sign was carved as Westbrook Academy.

=== Closure ===
Despite a campaign by parents, staff, pupils and members of the local community to keep Birkdale High School open, Kirklees Council formally closed the school in August 2011.

The school was merged with Westborough High School, with some pupils from Birkdale transferring to the Westborough campus. However, the former Birkdale High School campus is no longer used to educate any pupils, as the final set of year 11s have left.

== Notable staff ==
- Maggie Atkinson, Children's Commissioner for England was Head of English in the 1980s.

== Notable former pupils ==
- Sayeeda Warsi, Baroness Warsi, politician.
- Gary Sykes, featherweight boxer.
