= Briestfield =

Village in West Yorkshire, England

Coordinates: 53.64°N 01.65°W

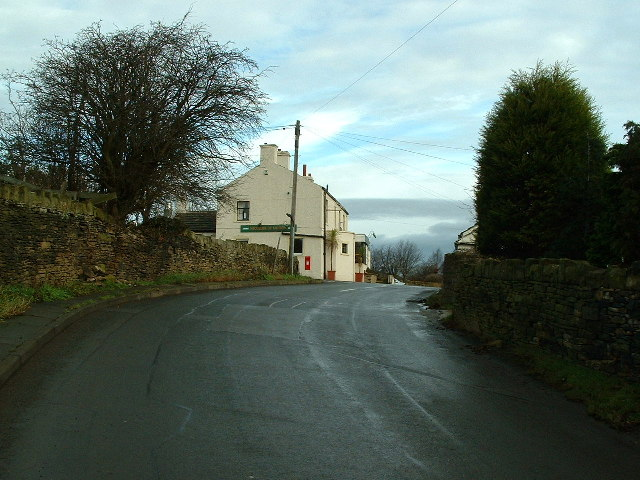
- The Shoulder of Mutton pub in Briestfield

- Location within West Yorkshire
- OS grid reference: SE2317
- Metropolitan borough: Kirklees
- Metropolitan county: West Yorkshire
- Region: Yorkshire and the Humber
- Country: England
- Sovereign state: United Kingdom
- Post town: DEWSBURY
- Postcode district: WF12
- Police: West Yorkshire
- Fire: West Yorkshire
- Ambulance: Yorkshire

Briestfield is a hamlet south of Dewsbury, in the Kirklees district of West Yorkshire, England.

It formed part of the township of Whitley Lower in the ancient parish of Thornhill. Whitley Lower was a separate civil parish after 1866, being absorbed back into Thornhill in 1896, which in turn was absorbed into the borough of Dewsbury in 1910.

== See also ==
- Listed buildings in Dewsbury
