= Dewsbury Town Hall =

Municipal building in Dewsbury, West Yorkshire, England

Coordinates: 53.6915°N 1.6269°W

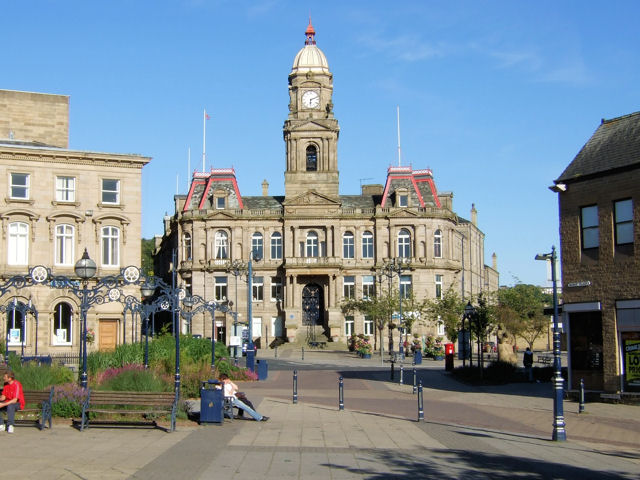
- Interactive map of the Dewsbury Town Hall area

General information
- Architectural style: Renaissance Revival
- Classification

Listed Building – Grade II
- Designated: 18 November 1977
- Reference no.: 1134707
- Location: Dewsbury, England
- Construction started: 1886
- Completed: 1889
- Cost: £40,000
- Client: Dewsbury Council

Technical details
- Structural system: Ashlar, Sandstone

Design and construction
- Architects: Henry Holtom; George Arthur Fox
- Engineer: Chadwick & Sons

Dewsbury Town Hall is a Victorian town hall that stands in front of the old marketplace in the centre of Dewsbury, West Yorkshire, England. It is a Grade II listed building.

== History ==
The site chosen for the town hall had previously been occupied by a hotel, a forge, a blacksmith and some other small businesses. The foundation stone was laid by Thomas Bateman Fox JP, mayor of Dewsbury, on 12 October 1886. The building was designed by local architects Henry Holtom and George Arthur Fox. The Cambridge quarter-chiming clock in the tower, which was financed by a gift from Alderman Mark Oldroyd, a later mayor, was supplied by William Potts and Son of Leeds and installed on 2 April 1889. The five bells, the largest of which weighed 35cwt, were supplied by Taylor of Loughborough. The building itself was built by Chadwick & Sons at a cost of £40,000 and was officially opened by Alderman John Walker JP, the next mayor, on 17 September 1889.

King George V and Queen Mary visited the town hall in July 1912 and returned in early 1918 to thank the people of Dewsbury for their efforts during the First World War.

In 1928, Charles Brook Crawshaw, a local colliery proprietor, left a collection of important paintings to the town hall including Joshua Commanding the Sun to Stand Still upon Gibeon, painted by John Martin in 1848, and "Stocks Closed Firmly with an Upward Tendency", painted by William Strutt in 1889. During the Second World War a bomb fell close to the town hall killing five residents and blowing out one of the stained glass windows in the building.

In January 1981, Peter Sutcliffe, the "Yorkshire Ripper", was held in the cells in the town hall following his arrest and he then appeared in the magistrates' court there. The magistrates' court in the town hall closed in the late 1980s.

More recently the building has been used in various television productions including the BBC series Spanish Flu: The Forgotten Fallen in August 2009, the ITV series Emmerdale in July 2011, the ITV series Eternal Law in May 2011 and the BBC series Love, Lies and Records in March 2017.

== Services ==
The town hall contains a 700-seat concert hall, function and meeting rooms, and an old court room.

== See also ==
- Listed buildings in Dewsbury
