= Dewsbury Minster =

Anglican church in Dewsbury, West Yorkshire, England

- All Saints' Church
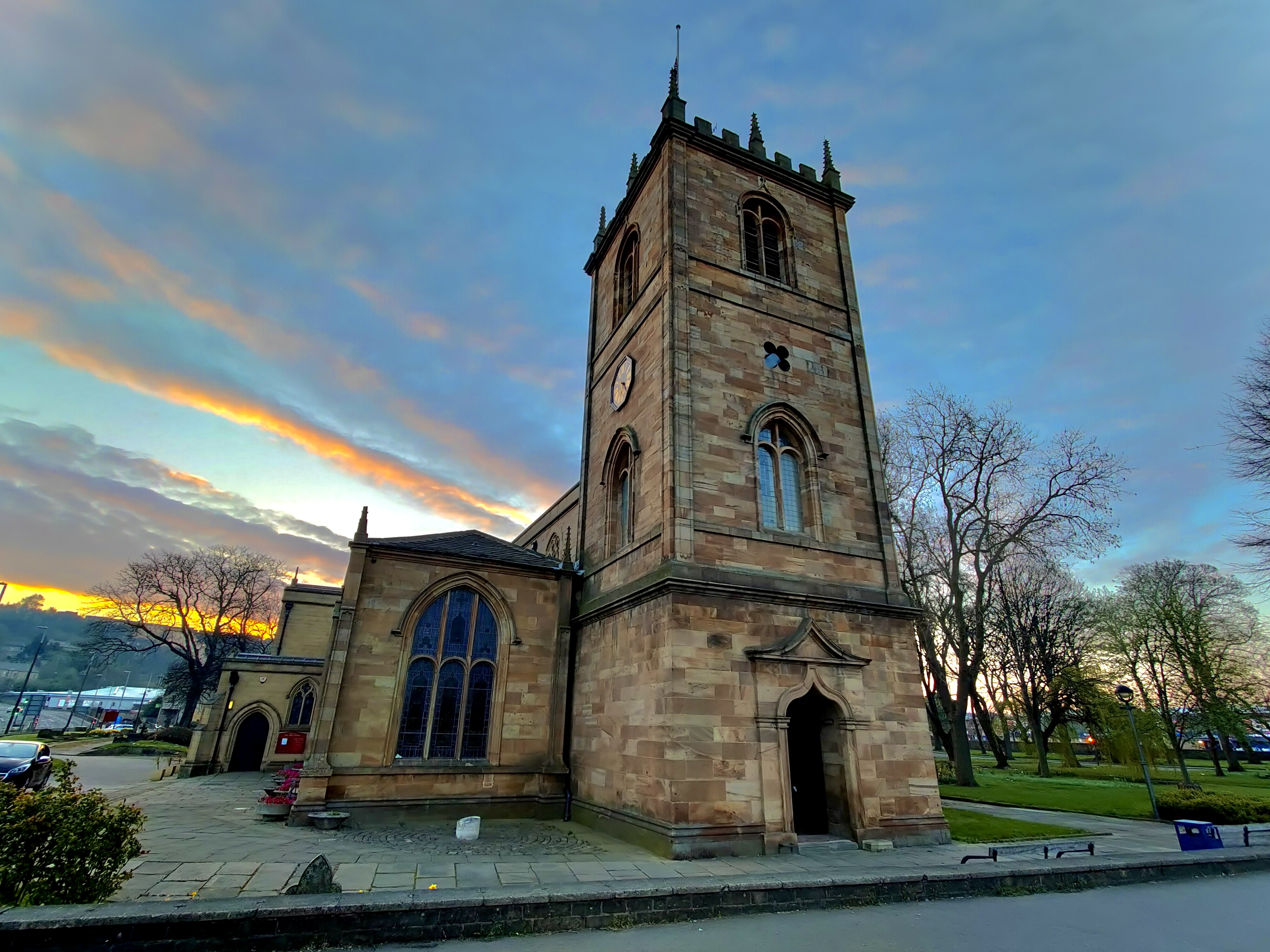
- Dewsbury Minster from the front
- Dewsbury Minster
- 53.6896°N 1.6291°W
- OS grid reference: SE 24590 21524
- Location: Dewsbury, Kirklees
- Country: England
- Denomination: Anglican
- Previous denomination: Catholic
- Website: DewsburyMinster.org.uk

History
- Status: Parish church

Architecture
- Functional status: Active
- Heritage designation: Grade II*
- Designated: 30 June 1949
- Style: Gothic revival

Administration
- Province: York
- Diocese: Leeds
- Archdeaconry: Pontefract
- Deanery: Dewsbury
- Parish: Dewsbury

Dewsbury Minster, the Minster Church of All Saints is the parish church in Dewsbury, Kirklees, West Yorkshire, England. It dates from the 13th century and was rebuilt in 1895. It is situated on Vicarage Road and Church Street in the centre of the town. In 1949 it gained Grade II* listed status. Dewsbury Parish Church was rededicated as a minster church in 1994. It is one of three churches in West Yorkshire to be given the honorific title "minster". The others are Halifax Minster and Leeds Minster.

== History ==
The north arcade of the church dates from 1220. The south arcade was built later that century. The ceiling of the nave was built in the 15th century. The tower and north aisle were built around 1767 and designed by John Carr. Patrick Brontë was a curate at Dewsbury from 1809 to 1811. In 1850, the ceiling was raised allowing more space for an organ loft to be installed. From 1884 to 1888, the church was extended to the designs of A. E. Street (the son of George Edmund Street) and A. H. Kirk. The east window and new pews were added during this time. In 1895, the south aisle was demolished and rebuilt in the Gothic revival style.

In 1912, a new carved-oak reredos was added, depicting Jesus Christ and the twelve apostles.

In 2013, the church received a grant from Kirklees Borough Council for £25,000 to build exterior lights to illuminate the church at night.

Dewsbury lies near the River Calder, traditionally on the site where Paulinus preached. Some of the visible stonework in the nave is Saxon, and parts of the church also date to the 13th century. The tower houses "Black Tom", a bell which is rung each Christmas Eve, one toll for each year since Christ's birth, known as the "Devil's Knell", a tradition dating from the 15th century. The bell was given by Sir Thomas de Soothill, in penance for murdering a servant boy in a fit of rage. The tradition was commemorated on a Royal Mail postage stamp in 1986.

== Gallery ==
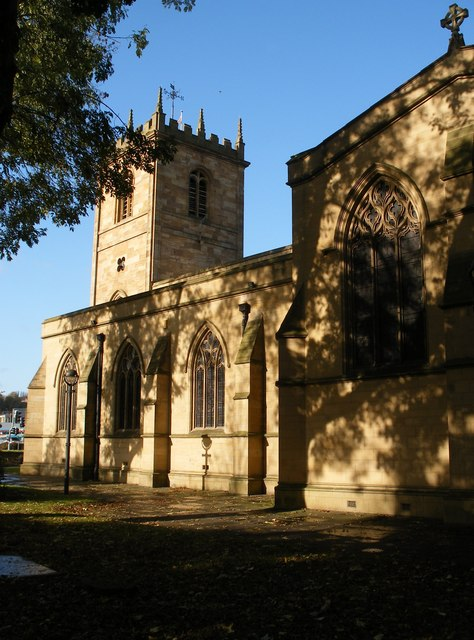
South side of the church

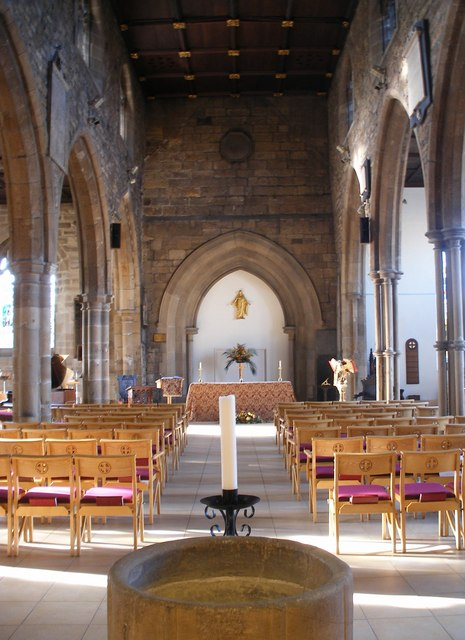
Interior

== See also ==
- Listed buildings in Dewsbury
- Grade II* listed buildings in Kirklees
- Diocese of Leeds
