= Boothroyd, West Yorkshire =

Village in West Yorkshire, England

Coordinates: 53.6894°N 1.6456°W

Boothroyd
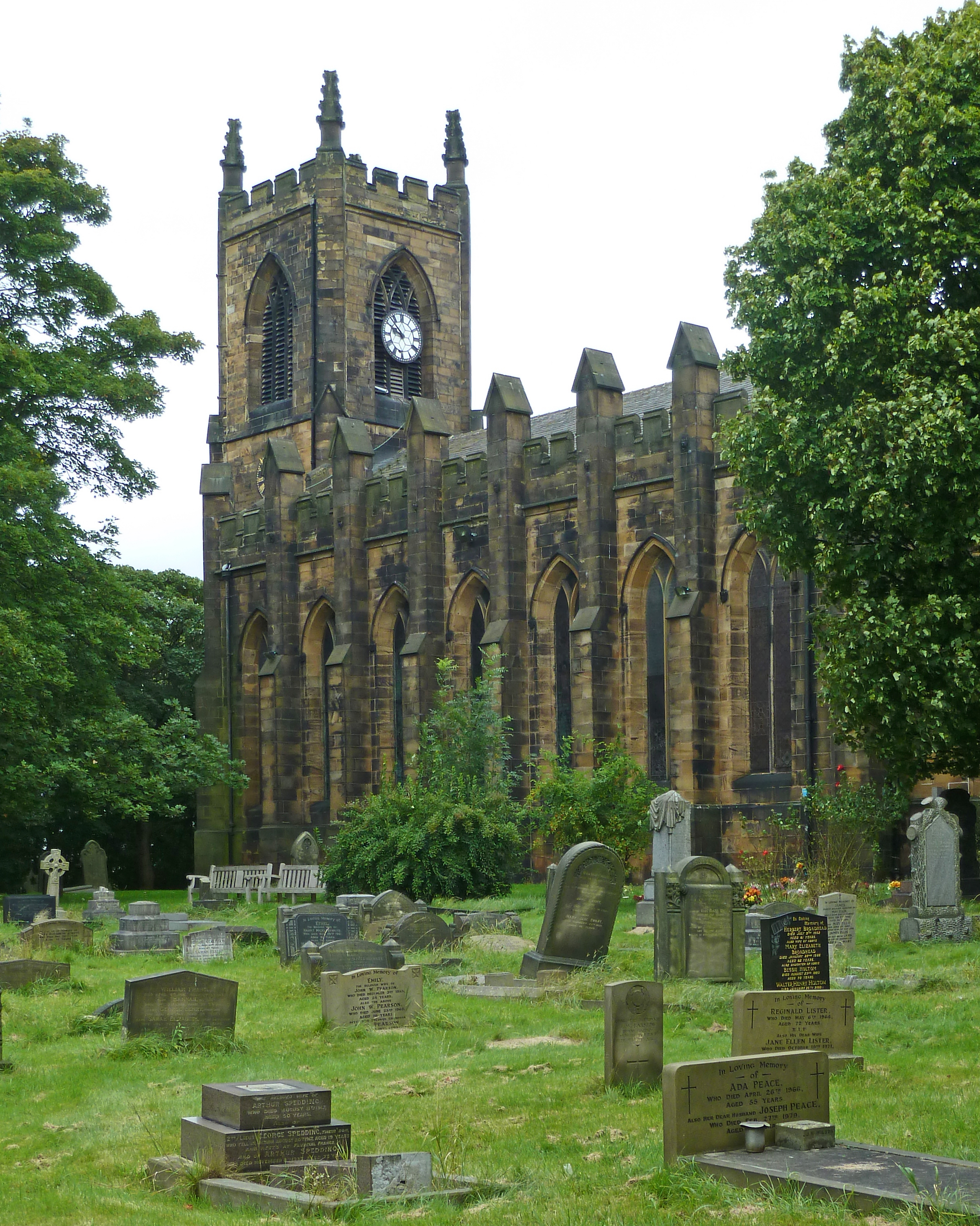
- Church of St John

- Location within West Yorkshire
- OS grid reference: SE235215
- Metropolitan borough: Kirklees
- Metropolitan county: West Yorkshire
- Region: Yorkshire and the Humber
- Country: England
- Sovereign state: United Kingdom
- Post town: DEWSBURY
- Postcode district: WF13
- Dialling code: 01924
- Police: West Yorkshire
- Fire: West Yorkshire
- Ambulance: Yorkshire
- UK Parliament: Dewsbury and Batley

Boothroyd is a village located west of Dewsbury in the Metropolitan Borough of Kirklees, West Yorkshire, England.

Boothroyd has a primary school. Grade II listed buildings in Boothroyd include the church of St John, the war memorial in Crow Nest Park, and the gate piers and gates to Crow Nest Park.

== See also ==
- Listed buildings in Dewsbury
