= Destination: Dewsbury =

2019 British film

- Directed by: Jack Spring
- Written by: Aaron Nelson
- Produced by: Jack Spring, Kate Dow
- Starring: David J. Keogh, Matt Sheahan, Dan Shelton, Tom Gilling
- Edited by: Carl Goldsmith, Kevin Chicken
- Release date: 2019
- Running time: 83 minutes
- Budget: £150,000

Destination: Dewsbury is a 2019 British comedy film directed by Jack Spring and written by David J. Keogh, Jonathan Marks, Aaron Nelson, Jack Spring, and John Spring.

== Cast ==
- Matt Sheahan as Peter
- David J. Keogh as Adam
- Dan Shelton as Gaz
- Tom Gilling as Smithy

== Production ==
The film was written in 2015 after director Jack Spring left The University of York. The budget for the film was raised over 12 months and production began in September 2016. The film was shot almost entirely in West Yorkshire. The BBC reported that this made Jack Spring the UK's youngest feature film director.

== Release ==
The film’s world premiere was at the 2018 Beverly Hills Film Festival. The film was released theatrically in the UK by Showcase Cinemas on 1 March 2019.
