= Crow Nest Park =

Public park in West Yorkshire, England

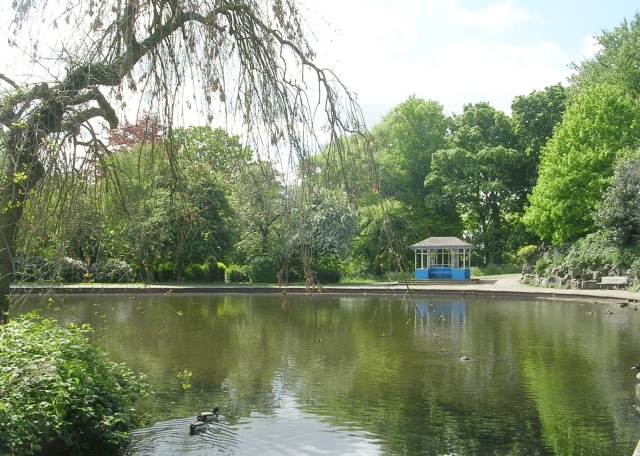
- Lake at Crow Nest Park
- Interactive map of Crow Nest Park
- Location: Dewsbury Moor, Dewsbury, West Yorkshire
- Nearest city: Wakefield
- Coordinates: 53°41′21″N 1°38′53″W
- Operator: Kirklees Metropolitan Council
- Open: 1893
- Awards: Green Flag

Crow Nest Park is a Green Flag awarded public park located in the Dewsbury Moor area of Dewsbury, West Yorkshire, England.

Opened to the public in 1893, the park originated on the grounds on a country house estate dating from the 16th century. It was created to bring a feel of the countryside into what was a heavily industrial area.

The park is situated on a hillside and offers views across the surrounding towns and countryside.

Attractions include an adventure playground, an ornamental lake, formal lawns, a walled wildflower garden, sports facilities, a greenhouse and a café.
