= Whitley Lower =

Village in West Yorkshire, England

Coordinates: 53.6568°N 1.6670°W

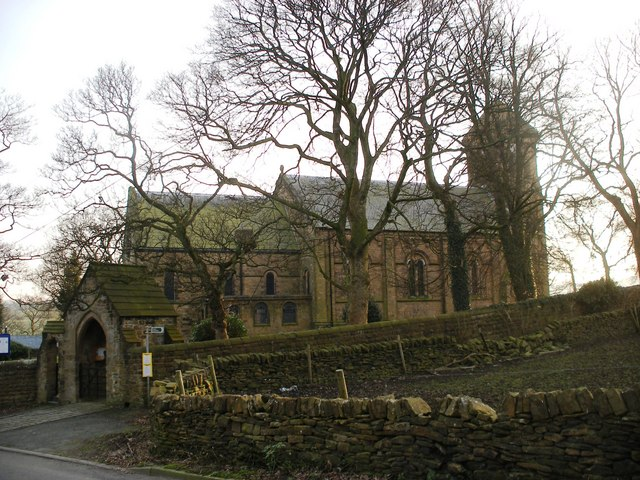
- St Mary and St Michael's Church Whitley Lower

- Location within West Yorkshire
- OS grid reference: SE221178
- Metropolitan borough: Kirklees
- Metropolitan county: West Yorkshire
- Region: Yorkshire and the Humber
- Country: England
- Sovereign state: United Kingdom
- Post town: Dewsbury
- Postcode district: WF12
- Police: West Yorkshire
- Fire: West Yorkshire
- Ambulance: Yorkshire

Whitley Lower is a village near Thornhill in Kirklees, West Yorkshire England. The parish church, dedicated to St Mary and St Michael, is part of the united benefice of Thornhill and Whitley which also includes Briestfield. The church was Grade II listed in 1985. In 1891 the civil parish had a population of 879.

== Governance ==
Whitley Lower was a township and chapelry in the parish of Thornhill, from 1866 Whitley Lower was a civil parish, on 26 March 1896 the civil parish was abolished and merged with Thornhill.

== See also ==
- Listed buildings in Dewsbury
