= Dewsbury Moor =

Coordinates: 53.6949°N 1.6554°W

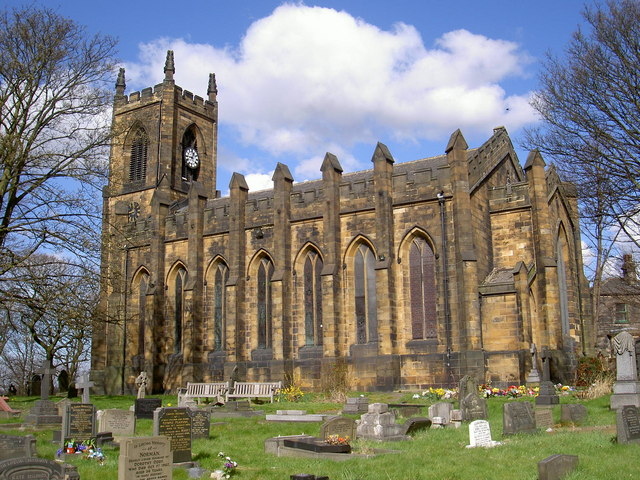
- St John the Evangelist Church, Dewsbury Moor

- Location within West Yorkshire
- Population: 5,650
- OS grid reference: SE 227 221
- Metropolitan borough: Kirklees
- Metropolitan county: West Yorkshire
- Region: Yorkshire and the Humber
- Country: England
- Sovereign state: United Kingdom

Dewsbury Moor is a district of Dewsbury, West Yorkshire, England. Historically part of the West Riding of Yorkshire, it lies to the west of the Dewsbury town centre. The population is around 5,650. Crime rates are higher than the national average.

== Sport ==
Dewsbury Moor ARLFC was founded in 1968 and is part of the wider Sports Club The club is based on Heckmondwike Road and boasts three pitches including the main pitch as well as a football pitch and a clubhouse The rugby club is one of the most well known amateur rugby league clubs and has turned out several notable rugby league professionals including Ryan Sheridan, Matt Diskin, Dean Lawford, The Burgess brothers, Sam Burgess, Luke Burgess, George Burgess and Tom Burgess. As well as the mens open age teams, the club also run junior teams.

The football team was formed in 2022 and are members of the West Yorkshire Football League.

== Schools ==
There are two schools, Knowles Hill Infant and Nursery School on Knowles Hill Road, and Westmoor Junior School on Church Lane.

== Shannon Matthews ==
The area was at the centre of national media and public attention in early 2008, when nine-year-old Shannon Matthews disappeared from near her home, in Dewsbury Moor, on the afternoon of 19 February 2008. After a 24-day search, she was found alive on 14 March 2008 at a flat in Batley Carr. Michael Donavan, the man whose flat she was found in, was (along with Shannon's mother Karen) later jailed for eight years for abduction and false imprisonment.

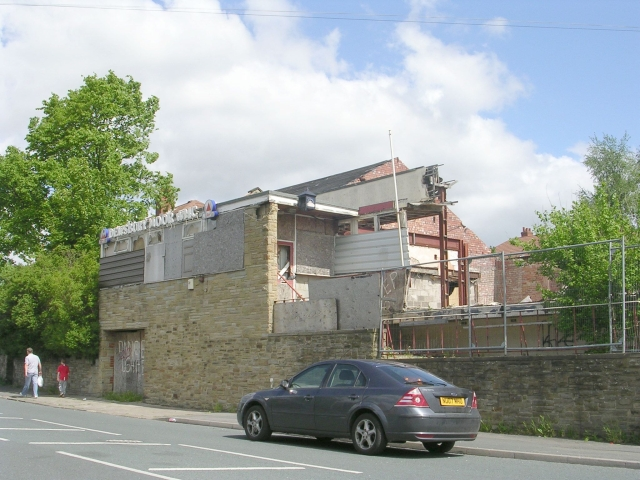
Derelict Dewsbury Moor Working Men's Club in 2009

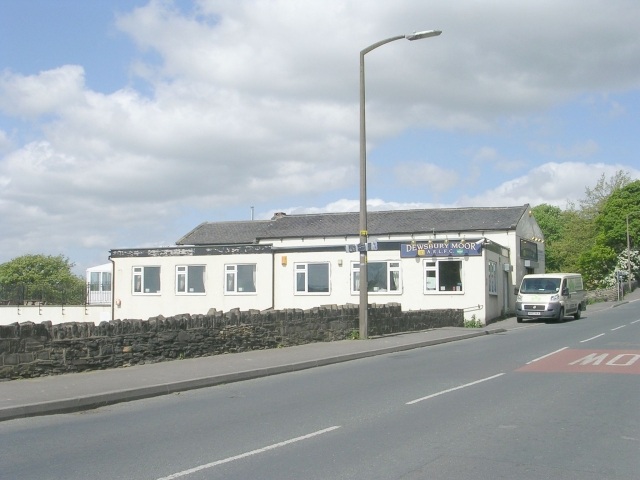
Dewsbury Moor Amateur Rugby League Club

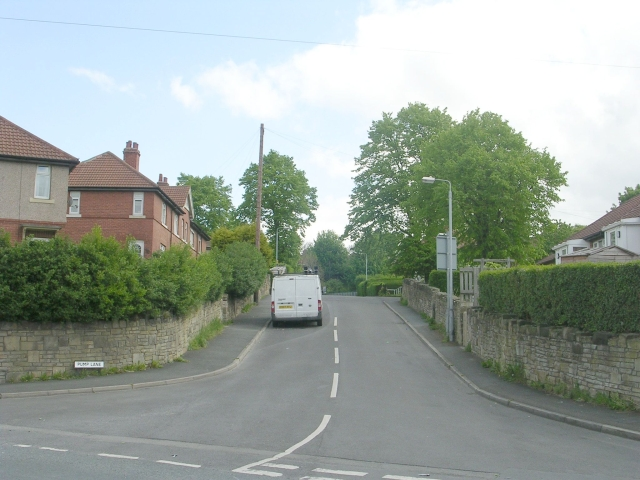
Pump Lane

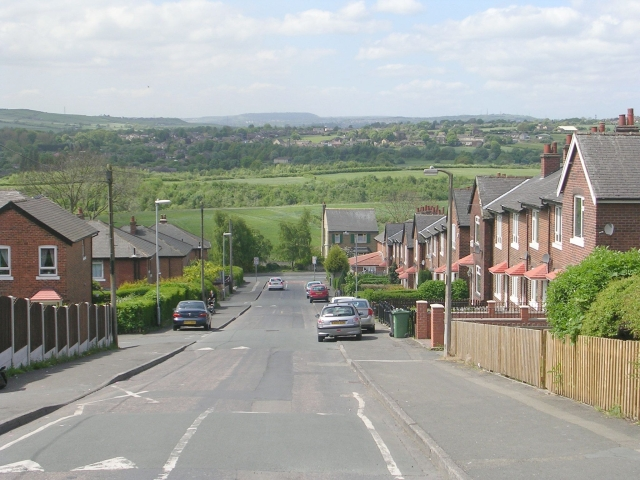
Beckett Lane
