= List of schools in Kirklees =

This is a list of schools in Kirklees in the English county of West Yorkshire.

== State-funded schools ==
=== Primary schools ===
- All Hallows' CE Primary School, Almondbury
- Ashbrow School, Huddersfield
- Batley Grammar School, Batley
- Batley Parish CE Junior and Infant School, Batley
- Battyeford CE Primary School, Battyeford
- Beaumont Primary Academy, Huddersfield
- Berry Brow Infant School, Berry Brow
- Birdsedge First School, Birdsedge
- Birkby Infant School, Huddersfield
- Birkby Junior School, Huddersfield
- Birkenshaw CE Primary School, Birkenshaw
- Birstall Primary Academy, Birstall
- Boothroyd Primary Academy, Dewsbury
- Brambles Primary Academy, Huddersfield
- Brockholes CE Junior and Infant School, Brockholes
- Bywell CE Junior School, Dewsbury
- Carlinghow Academy, Batley
- Carlton Junior and Infant School, Batley Carr
- Christ Church CE Academy, Huddersfield
- Clough Head Junior and Infant School, Golcar
- Co-op Academy Smithies Moor, Heckmondwike
- Crossley Fields Junior and Infant School, Mirfield
- Crow Lane Primary School, Huddersfield
- Crowlees CE Junior and Infant School, Mirfield
- Cumberworth CE First School, Upper Cumberworth
- Dalton School, Huddersfield
- Denby CE First School, Upper Denby
- Denby Dale First and Nursery School, Denby Dale
- Diamond Wood Community Academy, Dewsbury
- Earlsheaton Infant School, Dewsbury
- East Bierley CE Primary School, East Bierley
- Eastborough Junior and Infant School, Dewsbury
- Emley First School, Emley
- Farnley Tyas CE First School, Farnley Tyas
- Field Lane Junior and Infant School, Batley
- Fieldhead Primary Academy, Birstall
- Fixby Junior and Infant School, Huddersfield
- Flockton CE First School, Flockton
- Golcar Junior and Infant School, Golcar
- Gomersal Primary School, Gomersal
- Gomersal St Mary's CE Primary School, Gomersal
- Grange Moor Primary School, Grange Moor
- Hade Edge Junior and Infant School, Hade Edge
- Hanging Heaton CE Junior and Infant School, Hanging Heaton
- Hartshead Junior and Infant School, Hartshead
- Headfield CE Junior School, Dewsbury
- Headlands CE Junior and Infant School, Liversedge
- Healey Junior Infant and Nursery School, Batley
- Heaton Avenue Primary Academy, Cleckheaton
- Heckmondwike Primary School, Heckmondwike
- Helme CE Academy, Helme
- Hepworth Junior and Infant School, Hepworth
- High Bank Junior and Infant School, Hightown
- Highburton CE First Academy, Kirkburton
- Hightown Junior and Infant School, Liversedge
- Hill View Academy, Almondbury
- Hillside Primary School, Newsome
- Hinchliffe Mill Junior and Infant School, Holmbridge
- Holme Junior and Infant School, Holme
- Holmfirth Junior and Infant School, Holmfirth
- Holy Spirit RC Primary Academy, Heckmondwike
- Honley CE Junior and Infant School, Honley
- Hopton Primary School, Lower Hopton
- Howard Park Community School, Cleckheaton
- Hyrstmount Junior School, Batley
- Kaye's Academy, Clayton West
- Kirkburton CE First School, Kirkburton
- Kirkheaton Primary School, Kirkheaton
- Lepton CE Primary Academy, Lepton
- Lindley CE Infant School, Huddersfield
- Lindley Junior School, Huddersfield
- Linthwaite Ardron CE Junior and Infant School, Linthwaite
- Linthwaite Clough Junior and Infant School, Linthwaite
- Littletown Junior and Infant School, Liversedge
- Lowerhouses CE Junior and Infant School, Huddersfield
- Lydgate Junior and Infant School, Soothill
- Manorfield Infant and Nursery School, Staincliffe
- Marsden Infant and Nursery School, Marsden
- Marsden Junior School, Marsden
- Meltham CE Primary School, Meltham
- Meltham Moor Primary School, Meltham
- Mill Lane Primary School, Hanging Heaton
- Millbridge Primary Academy, Liversedge
- Moldgreen Community Primary School, Huddersfield
- Moorlands Primary School, Huddersfield
- Mount Pleasant Primary School, Huddersfield
- Netherhall Learning Campus, Huddersfield
- Netherthong Primary School, Netherthong
- Netherton Infant School, Netherton
- New Mill Infant School, New Mill
- New Mill Junior School, New Mill
- Newsome Junior School, Newsome
- Nields Junior and Infant School, Slaithwaite
- Norristhorpe Junior and Infant School, Norristhorpe
- Oak CE Primary School, Huddersfield
- Old Bank Academy, Mirfield
- Orchard Primary Academy, Chickenley
- Our Lady of Lourdes RC Primary Academy, Huddersfield
- Overthorpe CE Academy, Thornhill
- Paddock Junior and Infant School, Huddersfield
- Park Road Junior and Infant School, Batley
- Pentland Infant and Nursery School, Dewsbury
- Purlwell Infant School, Batley
- Ravensthorpe CE Junior School, Dewsbury
- Reinwood Community Junior School, Huddersfield
- Reinwood Infant School, Huddersfield
- Roberttown CE Junior and Infant School, Roberttown
- Rowley Lane Junior and Infant School, Lepton
- Royds Hall Academy, Huddersfield
- St Aidan's CE Academy, Skelmanthorpe
- St John's CE Infant School, Dewsbury
- St John's CE Junior and Infant School, Golcar
- St Joseph's RC Primary Academy, Dewsbury
- St Joseph's RC Primary Academy, Huddersfield
- St Mary's RC Primary Academy, Batley
- St Patrick's RC Primary Academy, Birstall
- St Patrick's RC Primary Academy, Huddersfield
- St Paulinus RC Primary Academy, Dewsbury
- St Peter's CE Junior and Infant School, Birstall
- St Thomas CE Primary School, Huddersfield
- Savile Town CE Infant School, Dewsbury
- Scapegoat Hill Junior and Infant School, Scapegoat Hill
- Scholes Junior and Infant School, Scholes
- Scholes Village Primary School, Scholes
- Scissett CE Academy, Scissett
- Shaw Cross Infant School, Dewsbury
- Shelley First School, Shelley
- Shepley First School, Shepley
- Skelmanthorpe Academy, Skelmanthorpe
- Slaithwaite CE Junior and Infant School, Slaithwaite
- South Crosland CE Junior School, Netherton
- Spring Grove Junior and Infant School, Huddersfield
- Staincliffe CE Junior School, Staincliffe
- Thornhill Junior and Infant School, Thornhill
- Thornhill Lees CE Infant School, Dewsbury
- Thurstonland Endowed First School, Thurstonland
- Upperthong Junior and Infant School, Upperthong
- Warwick Road Primary School, Batley
- Wellhouse Junior and Infant School, Golcar
- Westmoor Primary School, Dewsbury
- Whitechapel CE Primary School, Cleckheaton
- Wilberlee Junior and Infant School, Wilberlee
- Windmill CE Primary School, Batley
- Woodside Green Primary Academy, Huddersfield

=== Middle schools ===
- Kirkburton Middle School, Kirkburton
- Scissett Middle School, Scissett

=== Non-selective secondary schools ===
- All Saints Catholic College, Huddersfield
- Batley Girls' High School, Batley
- Batley Grammar School, Batley
- BBG Academy, Birkenshaw
- Castle Hall Academy, Mirfield
- Colne Valley High School, Linthwaite
- Creative and Media Studio School, Huddersfield
- Holmfirth High School, Thongsbridge
- Honley High School, Honley
- King James's School, Almondbury
- Manor Croft Academy, Dewsbury
- The Mirfield Free Grammar, Mirfield
- Moor End Academy, Huddersfield
- Netherhall Learning Campus, Huddersfield
- Newsome Academy, Newsome
- North Huddersfield Trust School, Huddersfield
- Royds Hall Academy, Huddersfield
- St John Fisher Catholic Voluntary Academy, Dewsbury
- Salendine Nook High School, Huddersfield
- Shelley College, Shelley
- Spen Valley High School, Liversedge
- Thornhill Community Academy, Thornhill
- Upper Batley High School, Batley
- Westborough High School, Dewsbury
- Whitcliffe Mount School, Cleckheaton

=== Grammar schools ===
- Heckmondwike Grammar School, Heckmondwike

=== Special and alternative schools ===
- Castle Hill School, Newsome
- Engage Academy, Batley
- Ethos College, Dewsbury
- Fairfield School, Heckmondwike
- Joseph Norton Academy, Scissett
- Ravenshall School, Dewsbury
- Reach Academy, Batley
- Southgate School, Almondbury
- Woodley School, Huddersfield

=== Further education ===
- Greenhead College
- Huddersfield New College
- Kirklees College

== Independent schools ==
=== Primary and preparatory schools ===
- Al-Furqaan Preparatory School, Dewsbury
- Dale House School, Batley
- The Mount School, Huddersfield
- Paradise Primary School, Dewsbury

=== Senior and all-through schools ===
- The Branch Christian School, Dewsbury
- Cambridge Street School, Batley
- Huddersfield Grammar School, Huddersfield
- Madni Academy, Dewsbury
- Rida Boys High School, Dewsbury
- Rida Girls High School, Dewsbury

=== Special and alternative schools ===
- Brian Jackson College, Heckmondwike
- ES Independent School Kirklees, Huddersfield
- Fields Rise School, Kirkheaton
- Holly Bank School, Mirfield
- Pivot Academy, Cleckheaton
