= Greenhead College =

Sixth form college in Huddersfield, West Yorkshire, England

- College logo

Location
- Greenhead Road; Huddersfield, West Yorkshire, HD1 4ES; England
- Coordinates: 53°38′49″N 1°47′31″W

Information
- Type: Sixth form college
- Established: 1980
- Local authority: Kirklees
- Department for Education URN: 130538 Tables
- Ofsted: Reports
- Chair: Richard Armstrong
- Principal: Mo Bunter
- Staff: 185 (approx.)
- Gender: Coeducational
- Age: 16 to 19
- Enrolment: 2,767
- Colours: Green & Gold
- Affiliations: Maple Group
- Website: www.greenhead.ac.uk

Greenhead College is a sixth form college, and former grammar school, in Huddersfield, in the county of West Yorkshire, England. The principal is Mo Bunter. With over 2,700 students, it is a large college, and students come from Wakefield, Manchester, Barnsley, Bradford, Leeds, Halifax, Wetherby and Wales, as well as from Huddersfield. It is next to Greenhead Park, one of the largest parks in Huddersfield.

== History ==
=== Grammar school ===
Greenhead High School for Girls was founded in 1909. The last O-levels were taken in June 1977. The girls grammar school incrementally became a sixth form college, from September 1973.

Graham Cooksey moved from Thomas Rotherham College to be headmaster from January 1973.

=== Sixth form college ===
It was a full sixth form college from September 1977, and celebrated 50 years of sixth form college education in the 2023-24 academic year.

== Reputation ==
The college was graded 'Outstanding' by Ofsted in 2025 - a status it has held and maintained since its very first report in 2004. It was also judged to be making a strong contribution to meeting skills needs. The college was awarded the Further Education College of the Year at the Educate North Awards in 2025.

Greenhead has a historically strong local and national reputation, topping both The Guardian and The Independent's A level college league tables in 2006 and was recognised as the Sunday Times's Sixth Form College of the Year, 2014-15.

== Subject choices ==
The college primarily offers A Level qualifications, with a few vocational courses. Prospective students choose from over 30 different subjects and usually study 3 courses as part of their study programme.

== Admissions ==
Students from local partner schools are given priority for places at the college, and are required to obtain a minimum of GCSE grades 4 in Maths and English language in addition to three GCSE grade 6s to gain a place at the college. Some subjects have more specific entry requirements.

Current local partner schools are All Saints Catholic High School, Colne Valley High School, Holmfirth High School, Honley High School, King James's School, Moor End Technology College, Netherhall Learning Campus, Newsome High School, North Huddersfield Trust School, Royds Hall Academy and Salendine Nook High School.

Students from other schools are considered based on their mock GCSE results, a one-to-one interview and the availability of subject places, this after local partner school students have been taken into consideration. Students from the Calderdale secondary schools, including The Brooksbank School, The Crossley Heath School and North Halifax Grammar School, can be accepted through the application process. In 2005, then-principal Martin Rostron said he believed the college has been criticised for selecting only the best students, which he denied, saying that Greenhead took those of all abilities.

== Campus ==
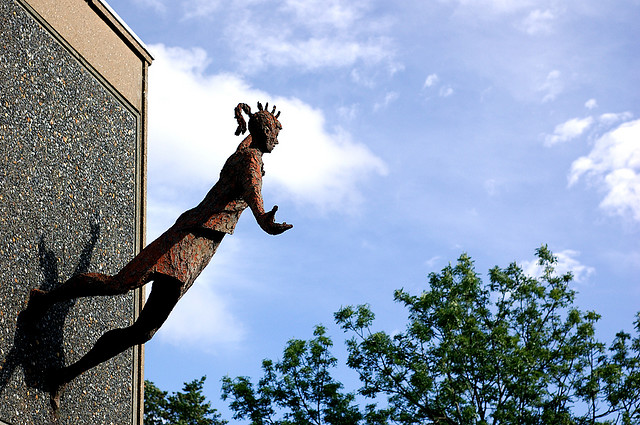
The wall art of the science block at Greenhead College

The Greenhead College campus is on one site, near the centre of Huddersfield, next to Greenhead Park. The college has eight main buildings. Each building represents a group of subjects.

On 26 May 2004, the college opened the Conway Building. The building was named after a former principal, Dr Kevin Conway. The Rostron Building opened in 2013 and the Cooksey Building opened in 2017 (named after former college principals Martin Rostron and Graham Cooksey respectively).

In November 2023 the college opened its new 'Hirst' building, named after former alumni and now biological scientist Judy Hirst. The Hirst building is a £25 million project funded by the Department for Education and built in collaboration between construction companies Galliford Try and Mace. The Hirst building provides facilities for the teaching of chemistry, biology and psychology. These subjects moved from the old Laingspan Science building, which was then demolished. There are large study and social areas with catering facilities. The building is carbon-neutral and has a bio roof and solar panels to generate electricity for the building.

Further work to construct 'The Quad', which connects the main building with the other buildings on site, was completed in August 2025, along with refurbishments to study rooms across the campus, a new library and the creation of 'The Hub', where students can access pastoral support.

== Enrichment ==
Greenhead's enrichment programme encourage students to take part in extracurricular activities. It was introduced in 1990, and awarded the Queen's Anniversary Prize in 2000, which stated that enrichment at Greenhead was "a national exemplar of what can be done at sixth-form level to extend students’ education and personal growth beyond their academic courses". Ofsted said in 2025 that "Students benefit from a rich and comprehensive enrichment programme which they take part in alongside their studies".

Enrichment is mandatory for all students. Activities include The Duke of Edinburgh's Award, sports, music and drama, information technology and volunteering. In 2025, over 100 different activities were available to students including sports and music groups. In 2018, the Greenhead College 'Carol for Yorkshire' raised over £700 for charity, and 2021 saw students participate in the Greenhead New Music Competition.

As part of their study programme, students take part in the college 'Step Into Your Future Week' in their first year. Students choose to explore one of 30 different career areas in more detail by undertaking a programme organised by college or can opt to carry out their own work placement.

== Awards ==
- Queen's Anniversary Prize for Excellence in 1996 and 2000
- The Educational Institution of the Year Award in 1999
- The Beacon College Award in May 1999 and in September 2004
- 'Outstanding' Ofsted inspections in 2004, 2008, 2022 and 2025
- Sunday Times's Parent Power Top State Sixth Form College of the Year 2014
- Music Mark Award in 2018 and 2025
- Quality Standard in Carers Support 2024
- Further Education Mental Health Award Gold 2024-27
- Educate North Awards: Further Education College of the Year 2025

== Notable alumni ==
- Lisa Head, first female bomb disposal officer in the British Army to be killed in operations
- Andi Durrant, radio presenter, music producer and disc jockey, best known as a presenter for Capital and Kiss
- Judy Hirst, FRS FRSC, a British scientist specialising in mitochondrial biology. Prof Hirst is interim director of the MRC Mitochondrial Biology Unit at the University of Cambridge
- Kieran Hodgson, actor and musician who co-wrote and starred in Prince Andrew: The Musical in 2022
- Jill Kemp, professional classical recorder player
- Jonathan Le Billon, actor best known for playing Brian Drake in Hollyoaks
- Janine Mellor, actress best known for playing Kelsey Phillips in BBC One's Casualty
- Kearnan Myall, rugby union footballer for London Wasps
- Neil O'Brien OBE, Conservative MP
- Matt Roberts, television presenter, best known for his work on BBC Sport's Moto GP coverage
- Mona Siddiqui OBE FRSE FRSA, British Muslim academic
- Harpreet Uppal, Labour MP, and first female MP representing Huddersfield
- Steven Woodcock, award-winning film director, writer, and producer
- Jessica Gunning, award-winning actress

=== Greenhead High School for Girls ===
- Catherine Aird
- Julia Annas, philosopher
- Cicely Pearl Blair
