= Leslie Julius Harris =

British biochemist and nutritionist

- Born: 1898; Liverpool
- Died: 1973 (aged 74–75)
- Education: Manchester University
- Spouse: Rosie Snowman
- Children: 2
- Awards: Chemical Society Medola medal (1925); Fellow of the Royal Institute of Chemistry
- Scientific career
- Doctoral advisor: Frederick Gowland Hopkins

Leslie Julius Harris (1898–1973) was a British biochemist and nutritionist. He was Director of the Dunn Nutritional Laboratory (now the MRC Mitochondrial Biology Unit) in Cambridge, UK, from its foundation in 1927 until his retirement in 1963. He was instrumental in setting up the (British) Nutrition Society, and the International Union of Nutrition Societies. His research focused primarily on vitamins, including developing the saturation test for assessing vitamin C levels in a urine sample, and showing that vitamins A and D are harmful in excess.

== Education and early life ==
Harris was born in Liverpool, the second son of pacifist rabbi John Solomon Harris. He was educated at Liverpool College and Manchester University where he studied science.

== Career and research ==
Harris was a research student under Cambridge biochemist Frederick Gowland Hopkins. His Ph.D. thesis (1923) was Titration of amino- and carboxyl- groups in amino-acids. In 1927 Harris was chosen as Director of the newly founded Dunn Nutritional Laboratory, a joint undertaking of the University of Cambridge and the Medical research council. His work at the Dunn concentrated on studies of the effects of deficiency and excess of vitamins A, B, C, and D in animals and humans, and the effects of preserving food on its dietary value. Harris’ research included the saturation test for assessing vitamin C levels in urine samples; showing that vitamins A and D are harmful in excess; and characterizing B complex vitamins in collaboration with Egon Kodicek, his successor as Unit director. He authored several books on vitamins, including the popular Vitamins in Theory and Practice.

During and after World War II, Harris advised the British government on nutrition, directing work in methods of preserving foods without loss of vitamins, and ensuring that rations supplied adequate vitamin levels.

In 1941 he was one of the founder members of the Nutrition Society of which he served as the first secretary, and later president. In 1946 he helped to set up the International Union of Nutrition Societies, of which he was secretary-general from 1946 to 1960.

== Personal life ==
In 1927 he married Rosie Snowman, daughter of Jacob Snowman. They had two sons: Michael Harris (born 1929), a medical doctor, and John Harris (born 1932), a physicist.
