= Rawthorpe =

District of Huddersfield, West Yorkshire, England

Coordinates: 53.657°N 1.757°W

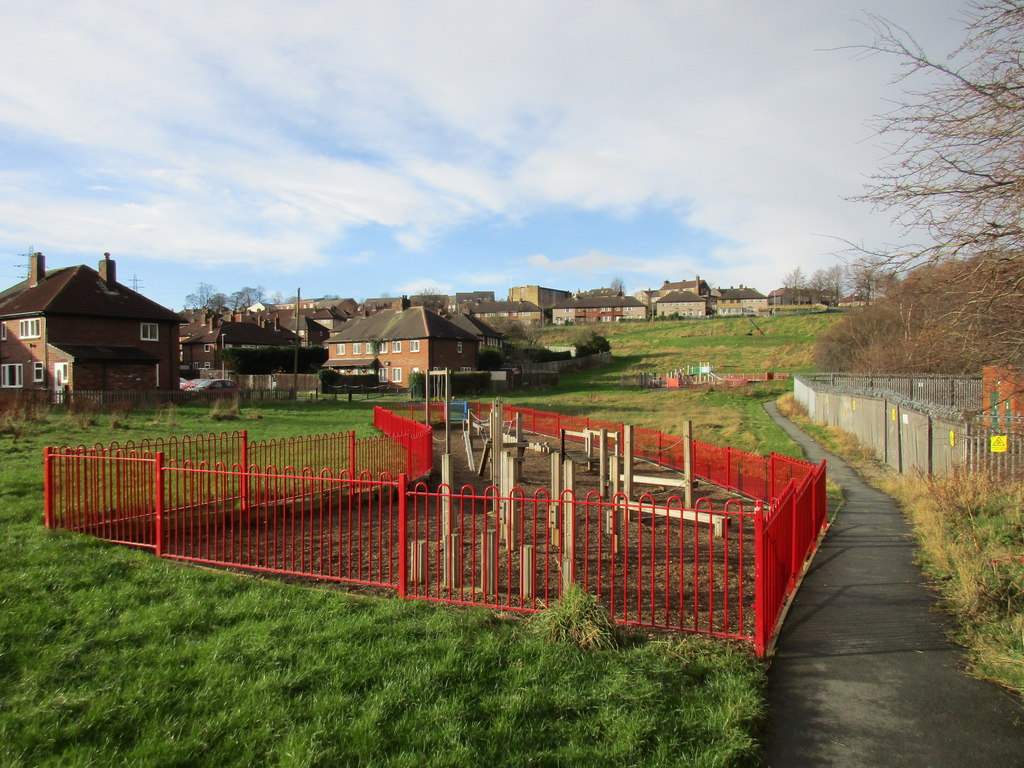
View from Dalton towards Rawthorpe

Rawthorpe is a district of Huddersfield, West Yorkshire, England.

It is situated at the top of Kilner Bank. A hill just to the east of Huddersfield town centre and close to the John Smith's Stadium. Its neighbouring area in the town is Dalton

Rawthorpe is mainly made up of a large council estate. The area also contains several notable buildings, including Nether Hall (now a riding school.) Netherhall Learning Campus (formerly Rawthorpe High School) is situated on Nether Hall Avenue, as is the Creative and Media Studio School.

Rawthorpe Hall, a Grade II listed building, now converted into dwellings gives its apparent Norse place name to the vicinity. Historically, Rawthorpe lies in the ancient civil parish of Kirkheaton and the township of Dalton.

== Transport ==
Bradley Mills Road in Rawthorpe has been the long time terminus of the First 370 bus route from Huddersfield Town Centre.
