= Mona Siddiqui =

British academic (born 1963)

Mona Siddiqui OBE FRSE FRSA
- Siddiqui in 2024
- Born: 3 May 1963 (age 63); Karachi, Pakistan
- Education: University of Leeds
- Occupation: Academic
- Website: www.kcl.ac.uk

Mona Siddiqui OBE FRSE FRSA (born 3 May 1963) is a British academic. She is Professor of Religion and Society at King's College London, a member of the Commission on Scottish Devolution and a member of the Nuffield Council on Bioethics. She is also a regular contributor to Thought for the Day, Sunday and The Moral Maze on BBC Radio 4, and to The Times, The Scotsman, The Guardian, and Sunday Herald.

== Early life ==
Siddiqui was born in Karachi, Pakistan. The family moved to England in 1965 when she was two years old. Her father was a psychiatrist and moved to England to carry out post-graduate work at Cambridge. His work eventually took the family to Huddersfield when he gained a substantive job. They lived in four successive houses in Huddersfield, moving partly because the family expanded from four to six, and finally into a 1930s detached house in a relatively prosperous area near the town centre. The household was very literary and there were many books in the house. Urdu was generally spoken at home, and so the children became bilingual. Her father also spoke Arabic and worked in Saudi Arabia for a few years, where he was visited by Siddiqui at the age of about 18 together with her sister.

At the age of 11, Siddiqui attended Salendine Nook High School, a multicultural school, where she excelled in English. She later moved to Greenhead College.

Siddiqui is fluent in French, Arabic, and Urdu and is married with three sons.

== Career ==
Siddiqui took her Bachelor of Arts degree in Arabic and French at the University of Leeds (graduating in 1984), and her Master of Arts in Middle-Eastern Studies and PhD in Classical Islamic Law at the University of Manchester (graduating in 1986 and 1992 respectively). She served as a member of the Advisory Boards for Glasgow's Gallery of Modern Art, Scottish Asian Arts, IB Tauris Religious Studies project and the Journal of the American Academy of Religion.

She has worked at the University of Glasgow since 1996, and in 1998 founded the Centre for the Study of Islam. In 2006, she was appointed Professor of Islamic Studies and Public Understanding, and served as a Senate Assessor on the University Court.

In 2011, Siddiqui became the first person to hold a chair in Islamic and Interreligious Studies at the University of Edinburgh's School of Divinity. She was subsequently appointed Dean International for the Middle East. In 2016, she delivered the Gifford Lectures on Struggle, Suffering and Hope: Explorations in Islamic and Christian Traditions at the University of Aberdeen.

Her areas of specialisation are classical Islamic law, law and gender, early Islamic thought, and contemporary legal and ethical issues in Islam. Professor Siddiqui is the author of 'How to Read the Qur'an' (Granta), a four-volume edited collection 'Islam' (Sage) and 'The Good Muslim' (CUP). She is currently working on two further monographs with Yale University Press and IB Tauris. She has published articles and chapters on classical Islamic Law and also writes and speaks frequently on Christian-Muslim issues.

Siddiqui is patron of The Feast, a pioneering youthwork charity which works for community cohesion between Christian and Muslim young people.

== Recognition ==
Siddiqui was elected a Fellow of the Royal Society of Edinburgh in March 2005 and of the Royal Society of Arts in October 2005. She also holds honorary D.Litt.s from the University of Wolverhampton and the University of Leicester. In addition. she was awarded an honorary Doctor of Civil Laws by the University of Huddersfield.

Siddiqui was appointed Officer of the Order of the British Empire (OBE) in the 2011 Birthday Honours for services to inter-faith relations.

In January 2013, Siddiqui was nominated for the Services to Education award at the British Muslim Awards.

She was elected to American Academy of Arts and Sciences - International Honorary Member (2019).

== Bibliography ==
Books

- Siddiqui, Mona (2007). How to read the Qur'an. London: Granta Books. ISBN 978-1-86207-945-8. LCCN 2007531519. OCLC 153559796. OL 16412049M.
- Siddiqui, Mona, ed. (2010). Islam. London: SAGE. ISBN 978-1-84787-360-6. LCCN 2009936870. OCLC 464585044.
- Siddiqui, Mona (2012). The good Muslim : reflections on classical Islamic law and theology. Cambridge: Cambridge University Press. ISBN 978-1-139-37934-2. LCCN 2011033316. OCLC 794669898. OL 25005310M.
- Siddiqui, Mona, ed. (2013). The Routledge reader in Christian-Muslim relations. London: Routledge. ISBN 978-0-415-68554-2. LCCN 2012045259. OCLC 731925305. OL 27586949M.
- Siddiqui, Mona (15 April 2013). Christians, Muslims, and Jesus. New Haven. ISBN 978-0-300-18926-1. LCCN 2013934407. OCLC 841216171. OL 26886833M.
- Siddiqui, Mona (2016). Hospitality and Islam : welcoming in God's name. New Haven: Yale University Press. ISBN 9780300223620.
