= Cicely Pearl Blair =

British dermatologist

Cicely Pearl Blair FRCP
- Cicely Blair
- Born: 20 May 1926; Huddersfield, West Yorkshire
- Died: 14 February 2005 (aged 78); London
- Spouse: Henry Blair (m. 1954–1984)
- Scientific career
- Fields: Dermatology

Cicely Pearl Blair FRCP (née Hopton; 20 May 1926 – 14 February 2005) was a British dermatologist. She discovered that people who had albinism did not get blackheads, as they did not produce melanin, the pigment that makes the comedones black. She also wrote about rashes caused by brown-tailed moth caterpillars. After her retirement, she turned her hand to art and especially silver smithing, fashioning a "chain of office" for the president of the British Association of Dermatologists.

== Early life ==
Blair was born Cicely Pearl Hopton on 20 May 1926 in Huddersfield, West Yorkshire. Her father, John Isaac Hopton, and her mother were both teachers. She attended Greenhead High School in Huddersfield before studying at the Royal Free Hospital School of Medicine in London. In 1951, she qualified as a medical practitioner, gaining posts first at the Royal Free Hospital and then at the London Jewish Hospital. In 1954, she married Henry Blair and the couple moved into general practice in Chingford, East London and remained in the role for 15 years. In 1969, the couple left general practice to focus on research, Cicely in dermatology and Henry in allergies.

== Dermatology ==
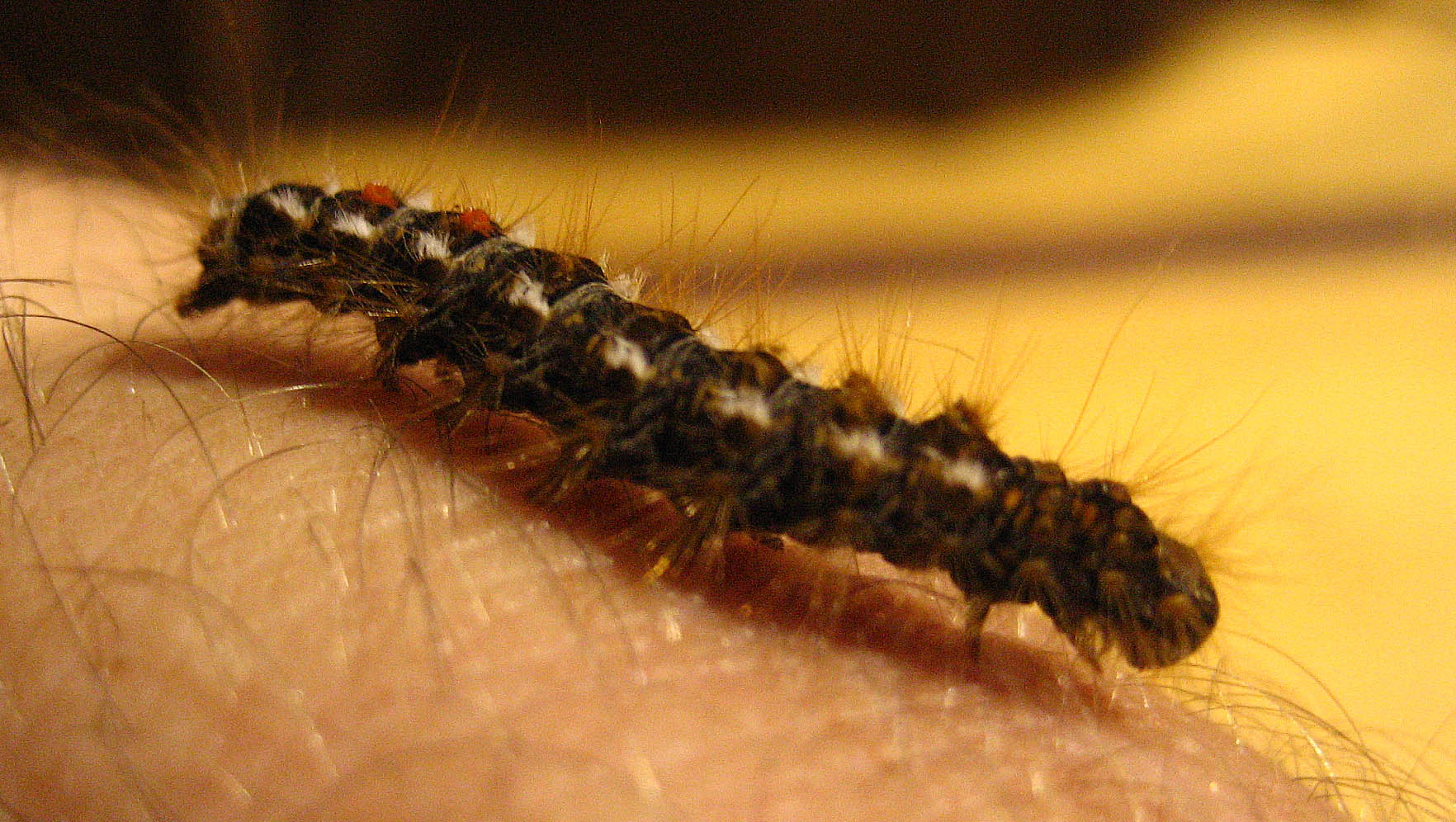
A caterpillar of the brown-tailed moth, similar to the ones studied by Blair

Blair left general practice in 1969 to focus on the study of dermatology. Over the next few years, she worked in a number of roles including a spell as a research assistant at St Bartholomew's Hospital. Whilst at St Bartholomew's, she focussed on acne research, discovering that the pigment in blackhead comedones is melanin and therefore that patients with albinism did not suffer from blackheads.

In 1974, she became a consultant at Oldchurch Hospital in Romford. There she continued her research, at one point publishing a paper on rashes which could be caused by caterpillars of the brown-tailed moth. Whilst at Oldchurch, Blair took an active interest in fundraising for the dermatology department. She is credited with setting up a number of events, which allowed the department to purchase an expensive PUVA machine.

== Retirement ==
Blair's husband, Henry, died in 1984 and as the couple had not had any children, she was free to focus on her own interests when she retired. She became an amateur silversmith, winning prizes for her sculptures and going on to make the "chain of office" for the president of the British Association of Dermatologists. She joined the Medical Art Society as a painter and spent time photographing flora and fauna, especially in the Galapagos and Falkland Islands. Blair died aged 78 on 14 February 2005 in London.

== Works ==
- Baker, Harvey; Blair, Cicely P. (6 June 1968). "Cell replacement in the Human Stratum Corneum in old age". British Journal of Dermatology. 80 (6): 367–372. doi:10.1111/j.1365-2133.1968.tb12322.x.
- Blair, Cicely (7 July 1968). "Morphology and thickness of the human stratum corneum". British Journal of Dermatology. 80 (7): 430–436. doi:10.1111/j.1365-2133.1968.tb11978.x.
- Blair, Cicely (8 August 1968). "The thickness of the stratum coeneum in acne vulgaris". British Journal of Dermatology. 80 (8): 516–519. doi:10.1111/j.1365-2133.1968.tb12340.x.
- Lewis, C.A.; Blair, Cicely (6 June 1970). "The Pigment of Comedones". British Journal of Dermatology. 82 (6): 572–583. doi:10.1111/j.1365-2133.1970.tb06098.x.
- Blair, Cicely (3 September 1970). "Angiokeratoma of the Vulva". British Journal of Dermatology. 83 (3): 408–411. doi:10.1111/j.1365-2133.1970.tb15727.x.
- Blair, Cicely (2 February 1976). "The action of a urea—lactic acid ointment in ichthyosis". British Journal of Dermatology. 94 (2): 145–153. doi:10.1111/j.1365-2133.1976.tb04363.x.
- Blair, Cicely P. (2 June 1979). "The browntail moth, its caterpillar and their rash". Clinical and Experimental Dermatology. 4 (2): 215–222. doi:10.1111/j.1365-2230.1979.tb01621.x.
- Blair, Cicely (2 April 1982). "The dermatological hazards of bowling Contact dermatitis to resin in a bowisgrip". Contact Dermatitis. 8 (2): 138–139. doi:10.1111/j.1600-0536.1982.tb04163.x.
