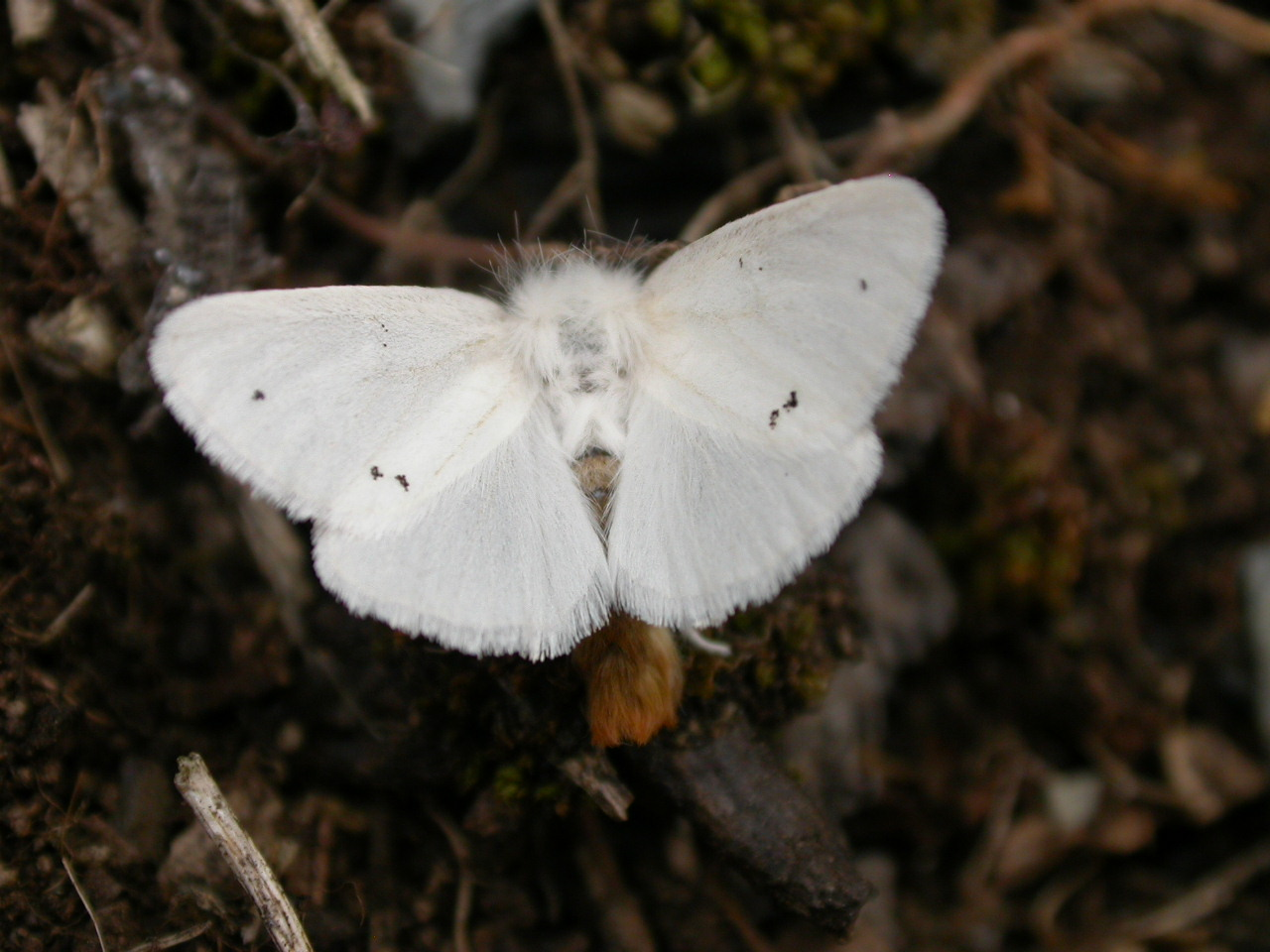
- Upperside
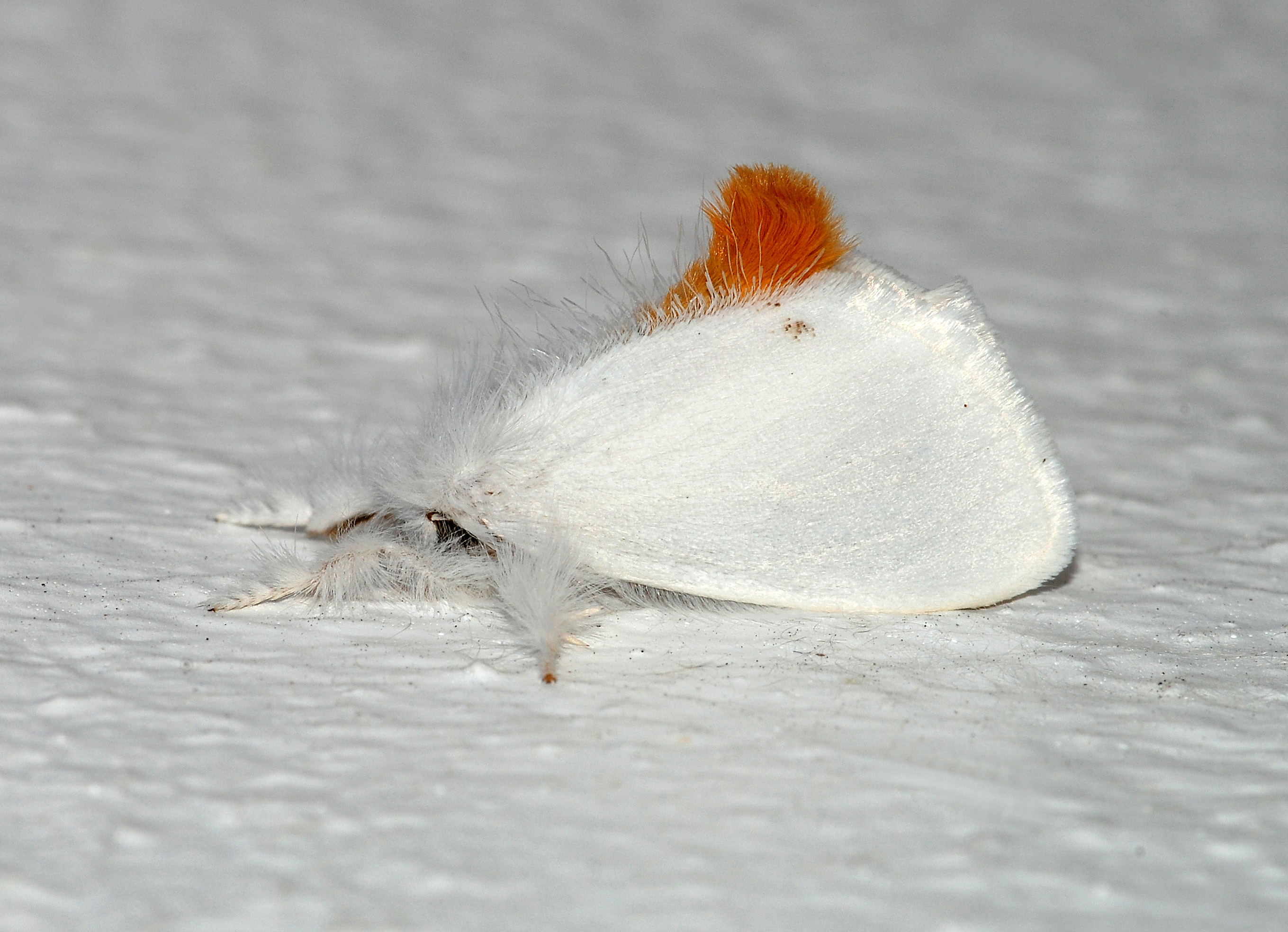
- Female with tail tuft of red/brown hairs

Scientific classification
- Kingdom: Animalia
- Phylum: Arthropoda
- Class: Insecta
- Order: Lepidoptera
- Superfamily: Noctuoidea
- Family: Erebidae
- Genus: Euproctis
- Species: E. chrysorrhoea

Binomial name
- Euproctis chrysorrhoea (Linnaeus, 1758)

= Brown-tail moth =

Euproctis chrysorrhoea

Species of moth

The brown-tail moth (Euproctis chrysorrhoea) is a moth of the family Erebidae. It is native to Europe, neighboring countries in Asia, and the north coast of Africa. Descriptions of outbreaks, i.e., large population increases of several years duration, have been reported as far back as the 1500s. The life cycle of the moth is atypical, in that it spends approximately nine months (August to April) as larvae (caterpillars), leaving about one month each for pupae, imagos and eggs. Larvae (caterpillars) are covered in hairs. Two red spots on the back, toward the tail, distinguish these species from other similarly hairy moth larvae. The winged adults have white wings and a hairy white body with a tuft of brown hair at the tip of the abdomen. Females lay one egg cluster, usually on the underside of a leaf of a host plant. The species is polyphagous, meaning that it feeds on many different species of trees, including pear, apple, maple and oak.

This species was accidentally introduced to the United States in the 1890s. During the early 20th century it was present from eastern Connecticut northward into New Brunswick, Canada, but a subsequent severe population collapse reduced the territory to parts of coastal Maine and Cape Cod, Massachusetts, by the late 20th century. One theory for the decline appeared to be parasitism by a fly introduced to combat spongy moths. Starting in 2015 there has been a population spike and territory expansion in coastal Maine. In Europe, there are multiple parasitic and predator species, yet there is still a history of population outbreaks.

Hairs from the caterpillars are toxic for humans, causing a poison ivy-like itchy rash of up to sometimes weeks-long duration due to mechanical and chemical irritation. Direct contact with larvae is not necessary, as the hairs are shed and can become windblown. Toxins in the hairs remain potent for up to three years. Outdoor activities such as mowing a lawn or raking leaves in the fall can cause exposure.

== Description ==
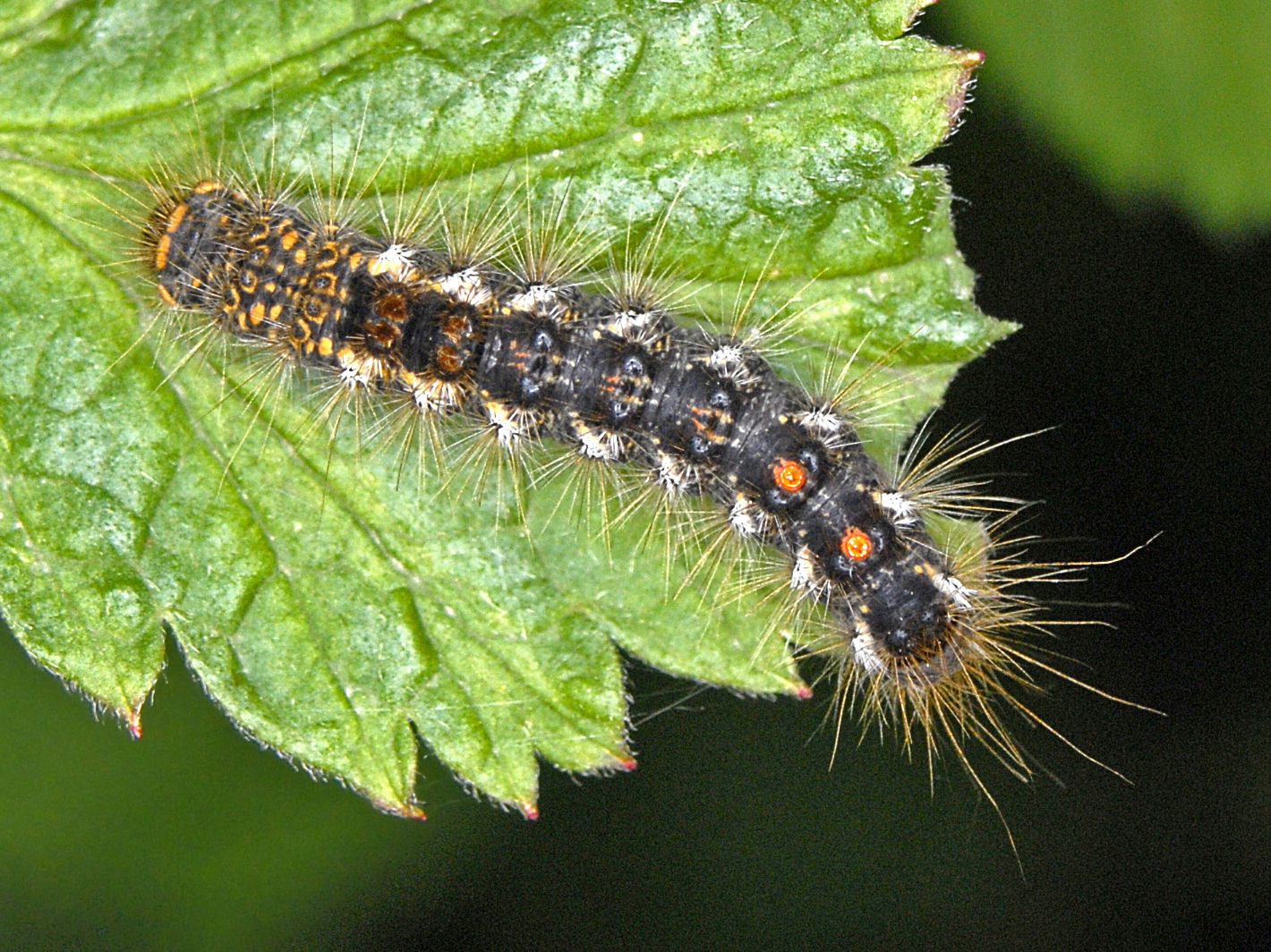
Caterpillar, dorsal view, showing two red dots near tail

The upper surface of the wings of this species is pure white. Males may have some brown color on the underside of the forewing. Wingspan is 36–42 millimetres (1.4–1.7 in). The body is very hairy and white except for the tail which is covered in reddish-brown hairs, much more prominent in the females. Males have larger antennae, used to detect pheromones released by unmated females. Females have a larger body. As winged adults, this species is superficially similar in appearance to Euproctis similis (native to Europe) and Hyphantria cunea (native to North America), but female E. similis have a yellow tail tuft and H. cunea lacks tail tuft coloration.

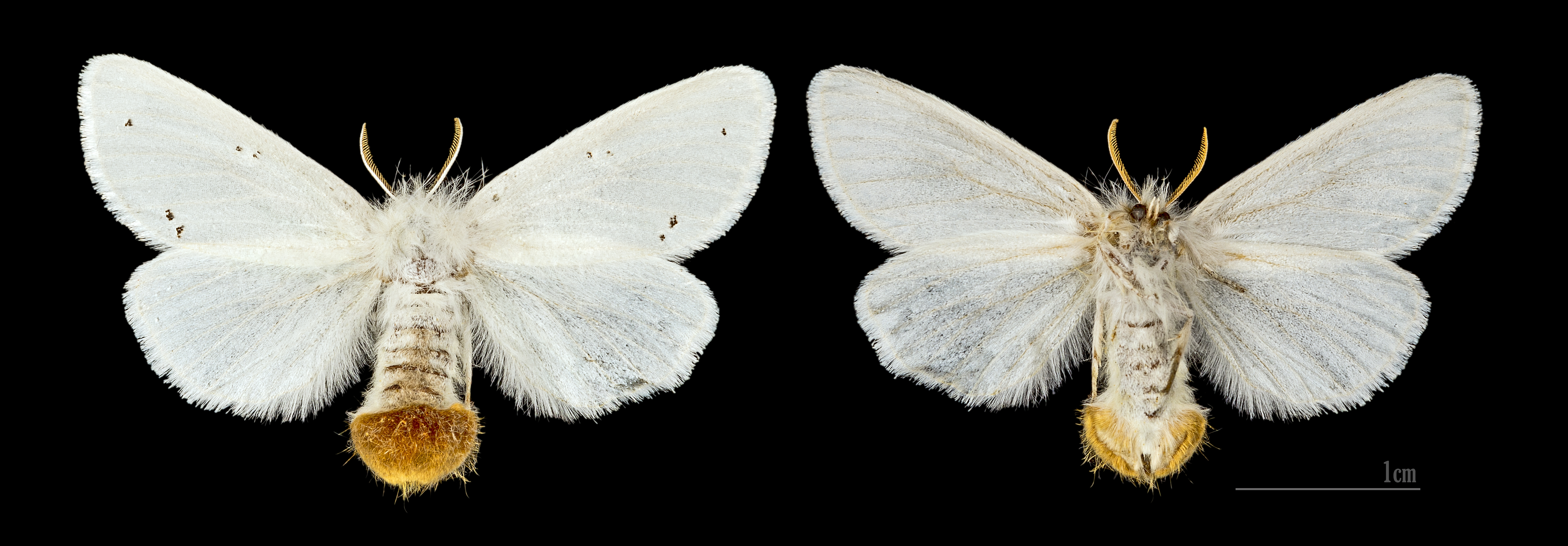
Female

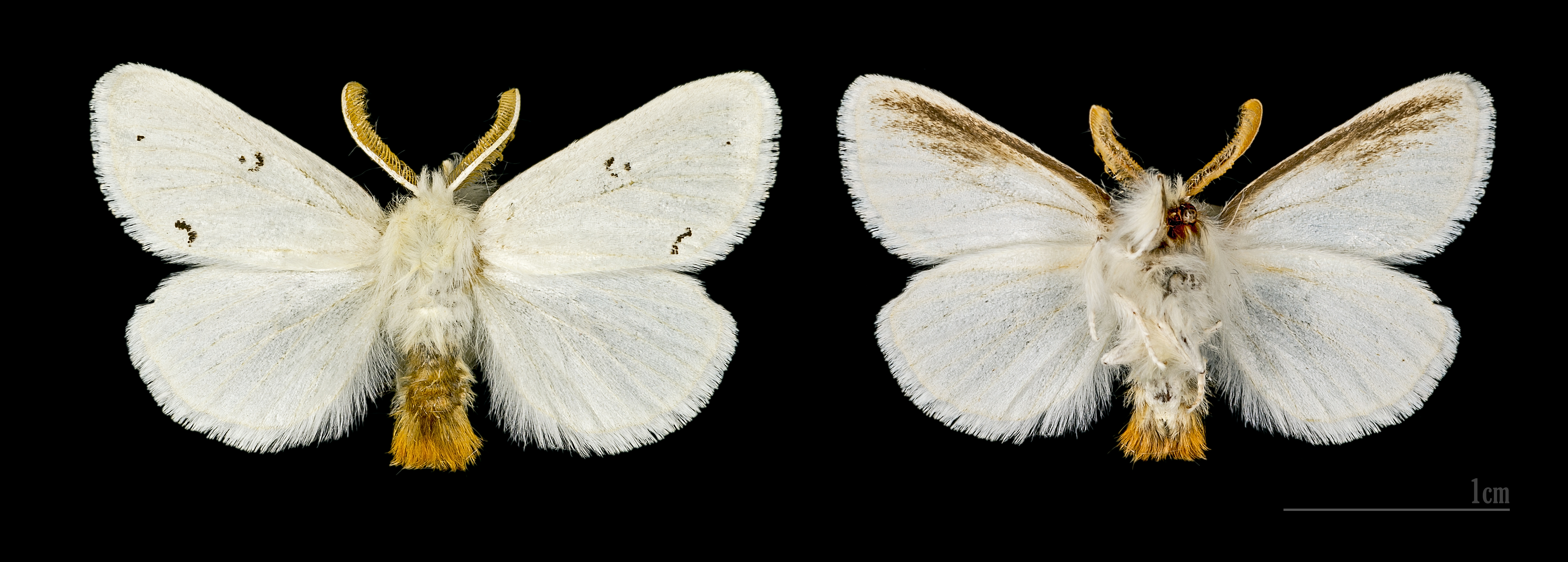
Male

The female lays one cluster of 200 to 400 eggs, typically on the underside of a leaf. The egg cluster is covered with hairs from her anal tuft. The larva is very hairy, brown with white markings, and two prominent red spots toward the tail end. The hairs provide protection from predators; the larva incorporates some into the cocoon within which it pupates. The species overwinters communally as larvae within a tough, silken tent constructed around branch-tip leaves and anchored to twigs. In areas where the species is abundant, these tents are a familiar sight, and can be seen on a huge range of plants, especially in late fall and winter when unaffected leaves have fallen.

== Distribution ==
=== Native ===
This species can be found throughout Europe, except in the most northern countries, also in the westernmost countries of Asia, such as Turkey, Syria and Israel, and the countries across the northern parts of Africa. Charles H. Fernald and Archie H. Kirkland recount historic mentions of brown-tail moths dating back to 1500s, describing outbreaks in Paris, London and Berlin so severe as to completely strip all trees of leaves. Carl Linnaeus described the species in the tenth edition (1758) of Systema Naturae.

=== Invasive ===
The brown-tail moth is an invasive species in the United States and Canada, having arrived in Somerville, Massachusetts, circa 1890 and becoming widespread there and in neighboring Cambridge by 1897. Initial outbreaks were most evident in pear and apple trees. Doctors reported "poisonings" (skin rash) far worse than poison ivy rash. Within a few years it was seen as a serious, fast-spreading, horticultural and health problem. Through the early parts of the 20th century it was present in much of New England from eastern Connecticut to Maine, and northward into New Brunswick, Canada, but the 1906 introduction of the parasitic tachinid fly Compsilura concinnata to counter spongy moths collaterally impacted brown-tail moths. By the late 20th century the habitat was reduced to the coast and islands of Maine, and also parts of Cape Cod, Massachusetts. Cold and wet weather hinders re-expansion of the population outside its current territories, although starting in 2015 there has been a population spike and territory expansion in coastal Maine, from Portland to Bar Harbor. In addition to North America, there have been reports of this species appearing in China, Japan and New Guinea.

=== Detection ===
Photographs taken from aerial fly-overs are used to identify areas where the trees have been denuded of leaves and where the branch-tip tents are present. The female sex hormone has been synthesized and field-tested in moth traps as a means of monitoring moth populations during the June/July flight season. The white-winged adults are nocturnal and strongly attracted to light; a report from 1903 likened their appearance around streetlights as being akin to heavy snowfall.

== Life cycle ==
The brown-tail moth produces one generation a year. It has four life stages; egg, larval, pupal, and adult. Eggs are laid in July and hatch in August. The annual cycle is approximately one month as eggs, nine months as larvae, one month as pupae, and one month as imagoes (winged, sexually mature adults).

1. Eggs are preferentially laid on oak trees.
2. Pre-diapausing larvae: Emerge and feed gregariously starting in August after about three weeks of egg incubation.
3. Diapausing larvae: As a response to shortened periods of daylight, larvae build communal winter nests in the fall, inside of which they overwinter. These involve webbing binding leaves together at tree-top branch tips. Distinct from other communal moth larvae such as eastern tent caterpillar which over-winter as eggs, then create webbed nests in branch crotches during spring and summer.
4. Post-diapausing gregarious larvae: The emerging larvae, approximately one centimeter long, resume feeding in early April synchronized with bud break, and still inhabit the winter nests as their resting places, or else make communal web-nests. These small larvae will also detach from trees and fall to the ground, then search for new trees.
5. Post-diapausing dispersive larvae: Once larvae reach late instars, colonies break up and larvae start feeding independently.
6. Pupation: Larvae pupate in June after six to eight instars.
7. Emergence: Imagoes (winged, sexually mature adults) appear about one month later; mate, lay eggs and die.

=== Predators, parasites and diseases ===
In the United States, many species of birds prey on the winged adults, including English house sparrow and blue jay. In a study conducted in England, egg, larvae and pupae deaths were attributed to several parasites, including microsporidia, cytoplasmic and nuclear viruses, and larvae predation by birds, specifically identifying the common cuckoo (Cuculus canorus) and titmice. A more recent review, conducted in Spain, identified 17 species of parasites, viral diseases, unspecified predation and other, unknown, causes of death spanning from eggs not hatching, during summer, winter and spring as larvae, finishing with pupae failing to produce winged adults. Generally, mortality increased with population density, although in outbreak regions there was some compensation by females laying 21.6% more eggs (cause not discussed).

Compsilura concinnata, a parasitic fly, pierces the brown-tail moth larva and deposits its own larva inside. This fly was introduced to North America in 1906 in an attempt to counter spongy moth, an invasive species. While not entirely successful for that purpose, one research group concluded that introduction of this fly had a great impact on brown-tail moths while not being as effective on spongy moths, the reason being that the fly larvae need to over-winter inside a host larvae. (Brown-tail moths over-winter as larvae, whereas spongy moths over-winter as eggs.) An older review describes other fly species that were confirmed as brown-tail moth larvae parasites, then released in U.S.: Apanteles lacteicolor, Metrous versicolor and Sturmia nidicola.

=== Control ===
Branch-tip webs can be clipped in winter and very early spring, and either dropped into a bucket of soapy water or burned. Gloves should be worn. Appropriate pesticides should be applied before early May because that is when the larvae start to develop harmful hairs. For organic garden and farm situations there are sprays that use a strain of Bacillus thuringiensis (Bt).

=== Population explosions ===
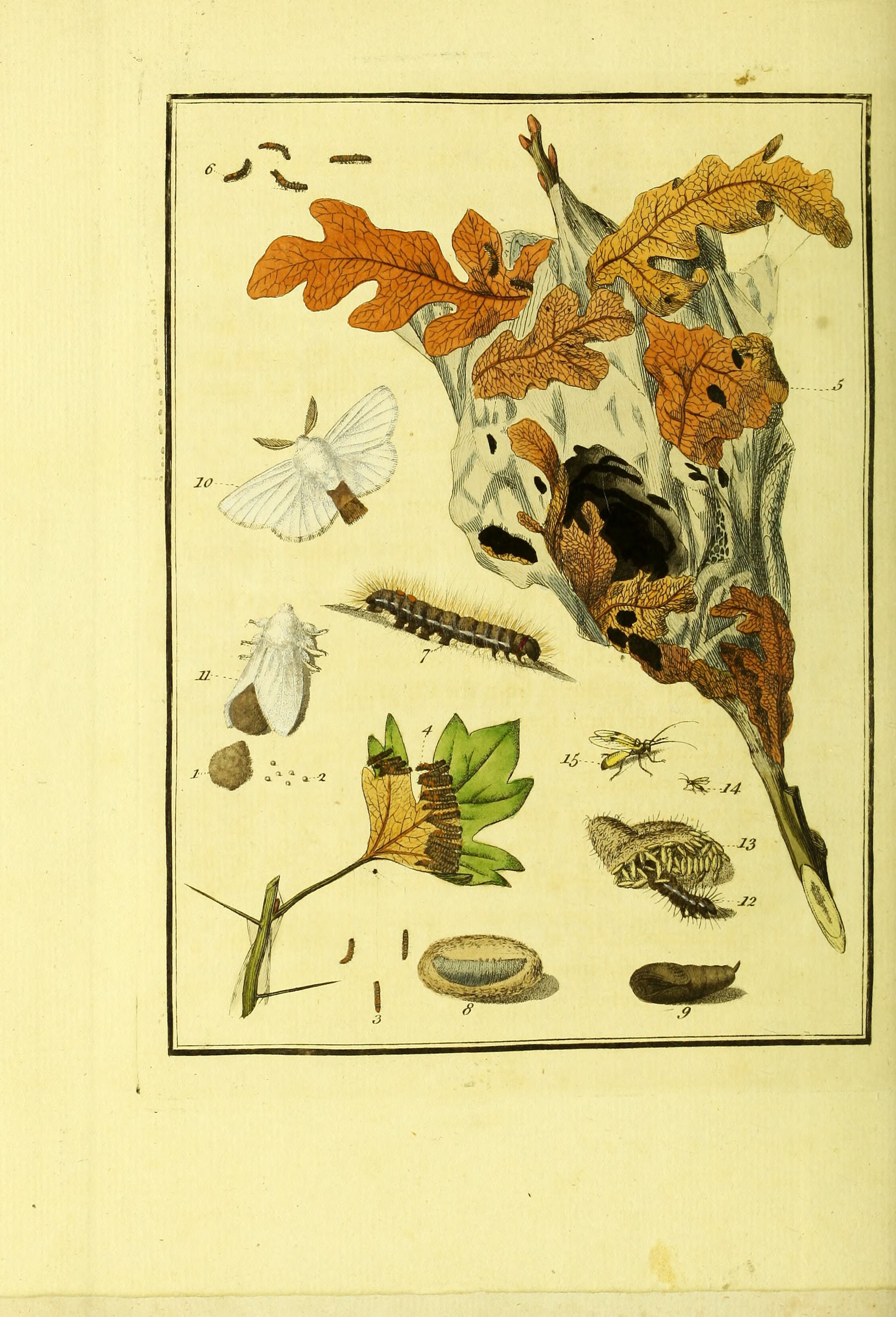
Colour plate from a pamphlet by William Curtis illustrating the moth's life cycle, intended to address public fear during a 1782 population explosion.

Historically the brown-tail moth has undergone periodic population outbreaks, each developing rapidly and lasting for months to years.

Population explosions in Maine in 2003 and 2016 caused widespread ecological damage, with more than 10,000 hectares affected in the latter case.

Réaumur recorded a devastating outbreak in France in 1730 near Paris.

An outbreak of caterpillars in London in 1782, when the city was still recovering from the Gordon Riots eighteen months before, caused widespread panic and fears of famine and plague. Contemporary scientists such as William Curtis attempted to calm public fears; it is unclear how much effect this had.

== Health issues ==
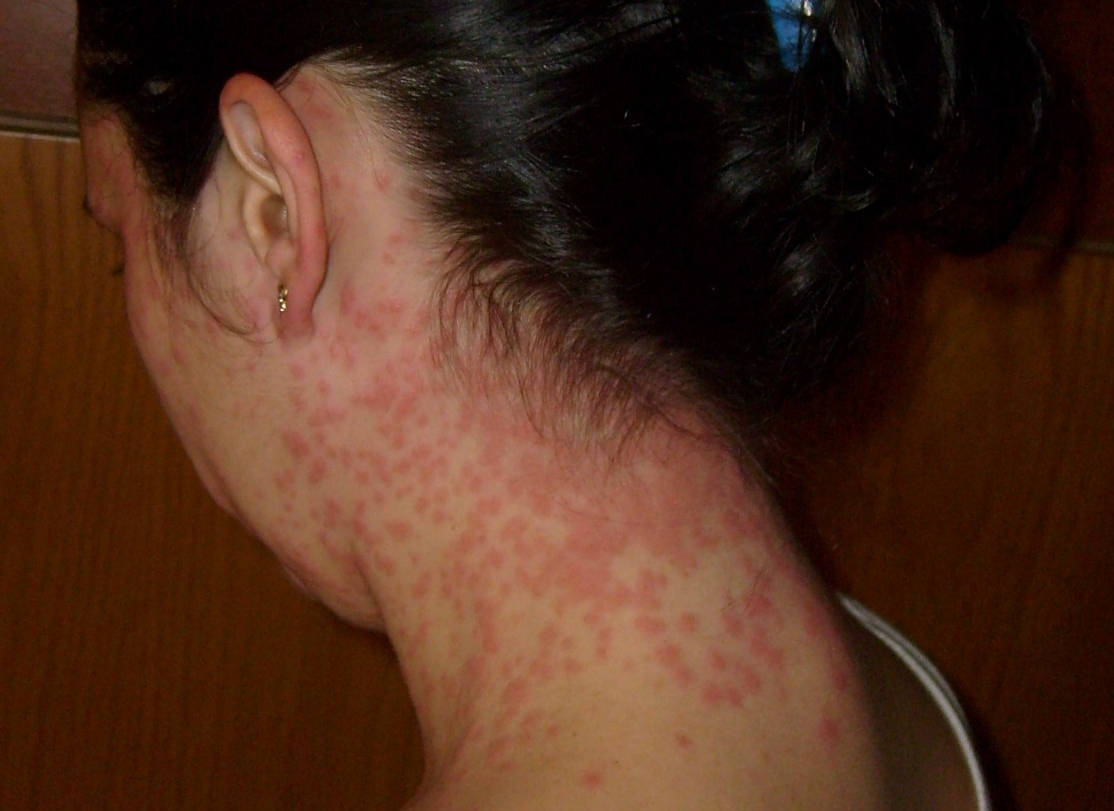
Skin rash caused by the exposure to hairs shed by brown-tail moth larva

Cicely Blair wrote a paper about the rash caused by the brown-tail moth caterpillar in the British Isles. It, and other descriptions, confirmed that loose hairs can break off and cause very itchy rashes on contact with skin, as well as breathing difficulties similar to asthma if inhaled. Rashes can persist for weeks. The same symptoms have been reported as far back as 1903. The reactions are due to a combination of mechanical and chemical stimuli, the barbed hairs in effect becoming lodged in and physically irritating the skin, and also functioning as microtubules to introduce irritating chemical compounds that have hydrolase, esterase and hemolytic activity. This rash reaction may be referred to as lepidopterism. The species should be handled using protective gloves at all stages of its life cycle. Shed hairs blow about, and can be brought indoors on clothing and shoes, so rashes can occur without the victim coming in direct contact with the caterpillars. The toxins in the hairs remain potent for up to three years after being shed. Outdoor activities such as mowing a lawn or raking leaves in the fall can cause exposure.

A related species, mistletoe browntail moth (Euproctis edwardsi), has been reported as causing a similar rash in Australia, in people working at or visiting a community center, attributed to caterpillars feeding on a tree outside the building. In addition to brown-tail and mistletoe browntail, several other Euproctis species are identified as causing rashes in humans, including Euproctis baliolalis, Euproctis limbalis and Euproctis lutea (all three native to Australia). Urticating hairs, i.e., itch and rash-producing, are also reported for caterpillars of other moth and butterfly species.

== Host plants ==
Brown-tail larvae have been reported as feeding on 26 genera of non-resinous trees and shrubs belonging to 13 different families. This polyphagy is considered unusual. Non-specific host plant feeding combined with its tendency to reach extreme outbreak densities makes this species a major pest of fruit orchards, ornamental trees and hardwood forests. Partial list of plant species: apple, cherry, beach plum (Cape Cod, Massachusetts), beech, elm, grape, hops, maple, oak, pear, raspberry, rose and willow, and even conifers like spruce and hemlock. An early description of the introduction to the United States in the 1890s identified pear and apple trees as most greatly afflicted, but mentioned that once trees were entirely bare of leaves, the larvae would descend to the ground in great numbers and move toward any leafy plant, including vegetable plants. A population explosion on Orford Ness, Suffolk, Uk in 2023-2024 has denuded wild bramble/blackberry bushes.

== Gallery ==
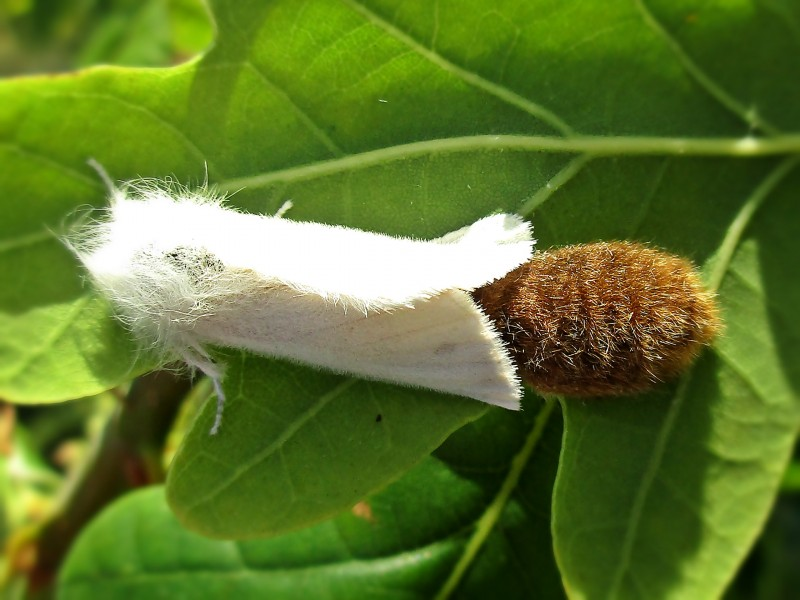
Oviposition of hair-covered egg mass containing 200-400 eggs

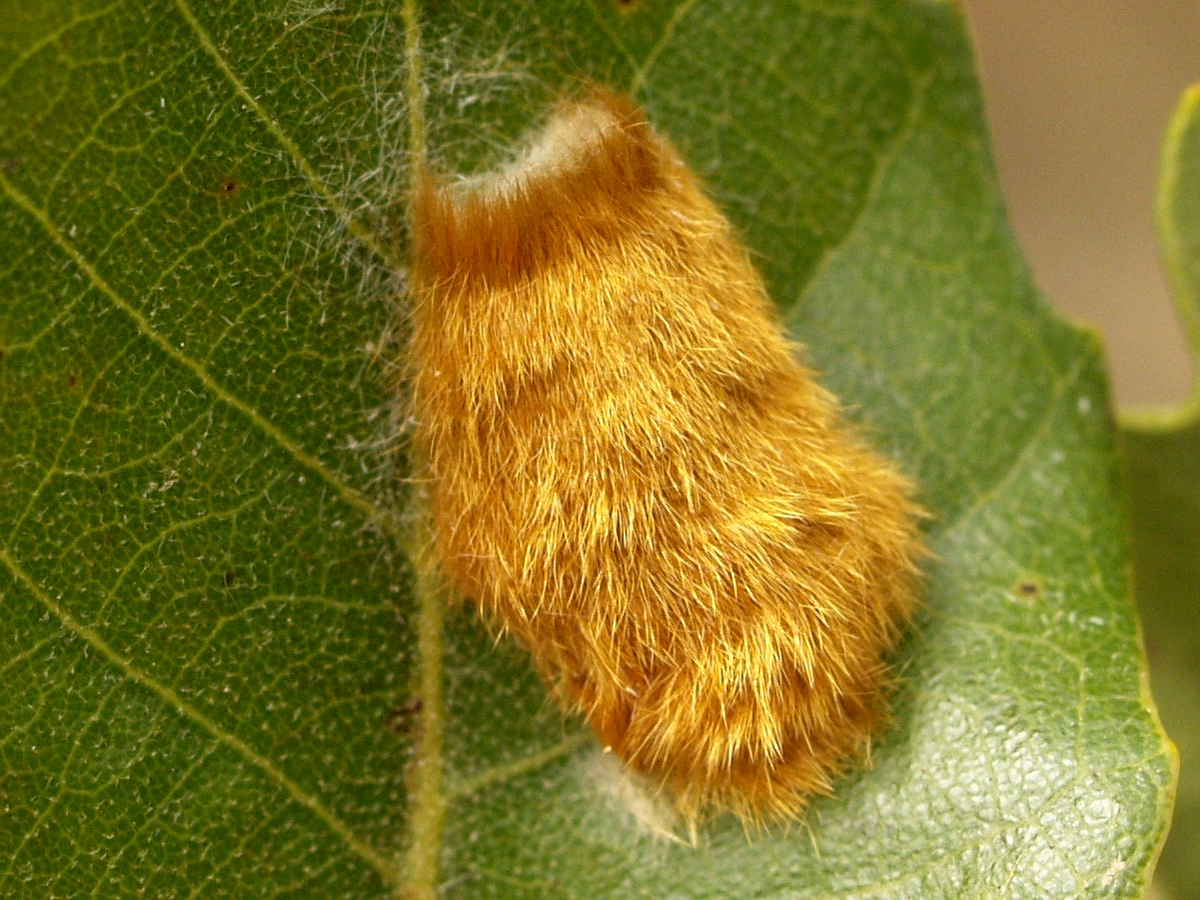
Egg mass covered with brown hairs from body of the egg-laying female

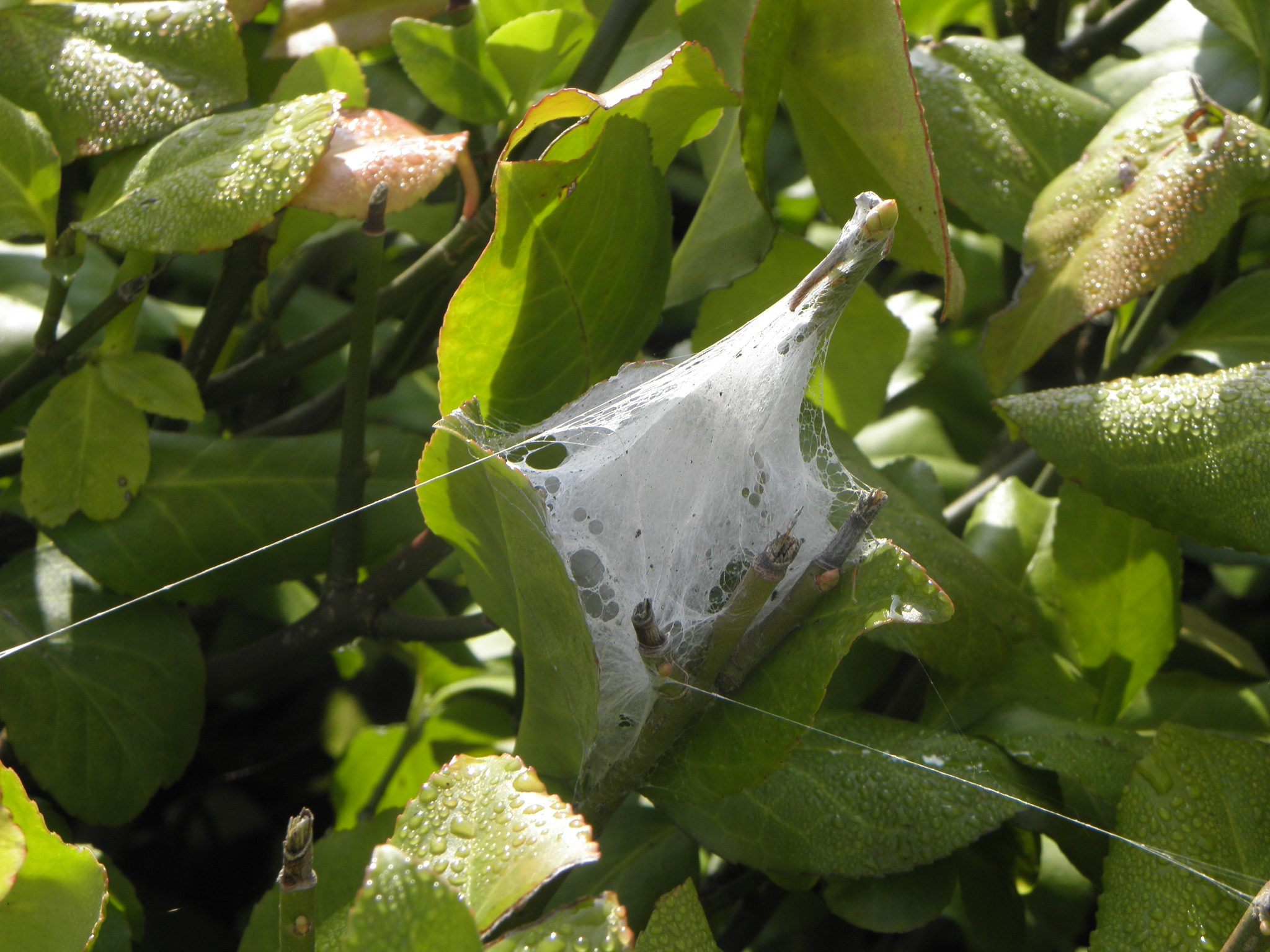
The protective communal silken tent. Created in the fall, the larvae over-winter inside, emerging in spring.

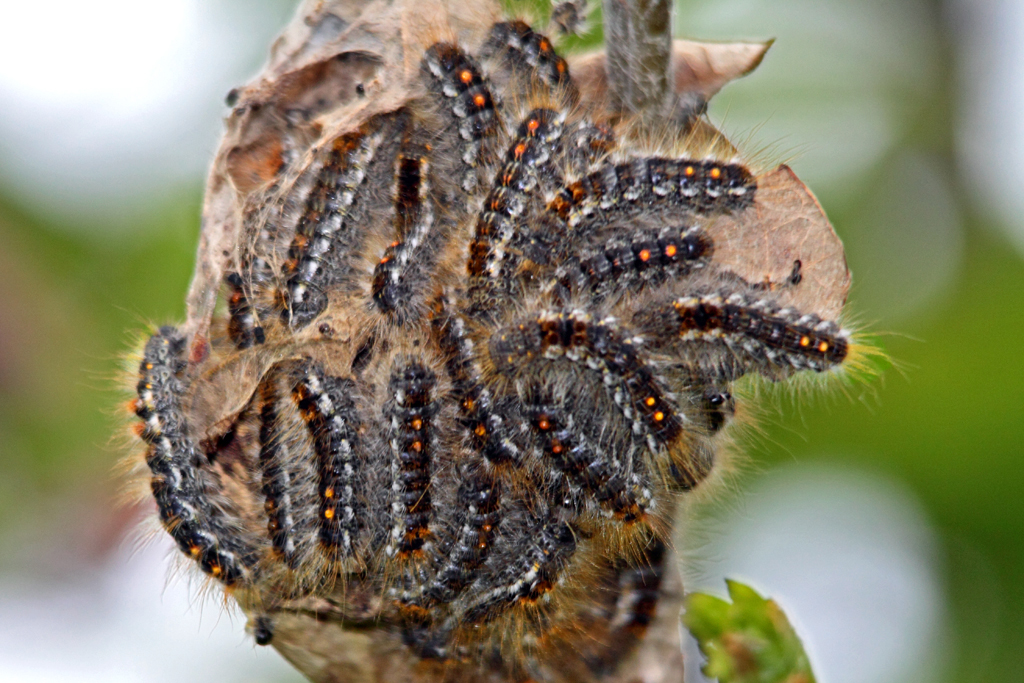
Group of larvae on branch-tip nest. Once larvae reach late instars, colonies break up and larvae feed independently.

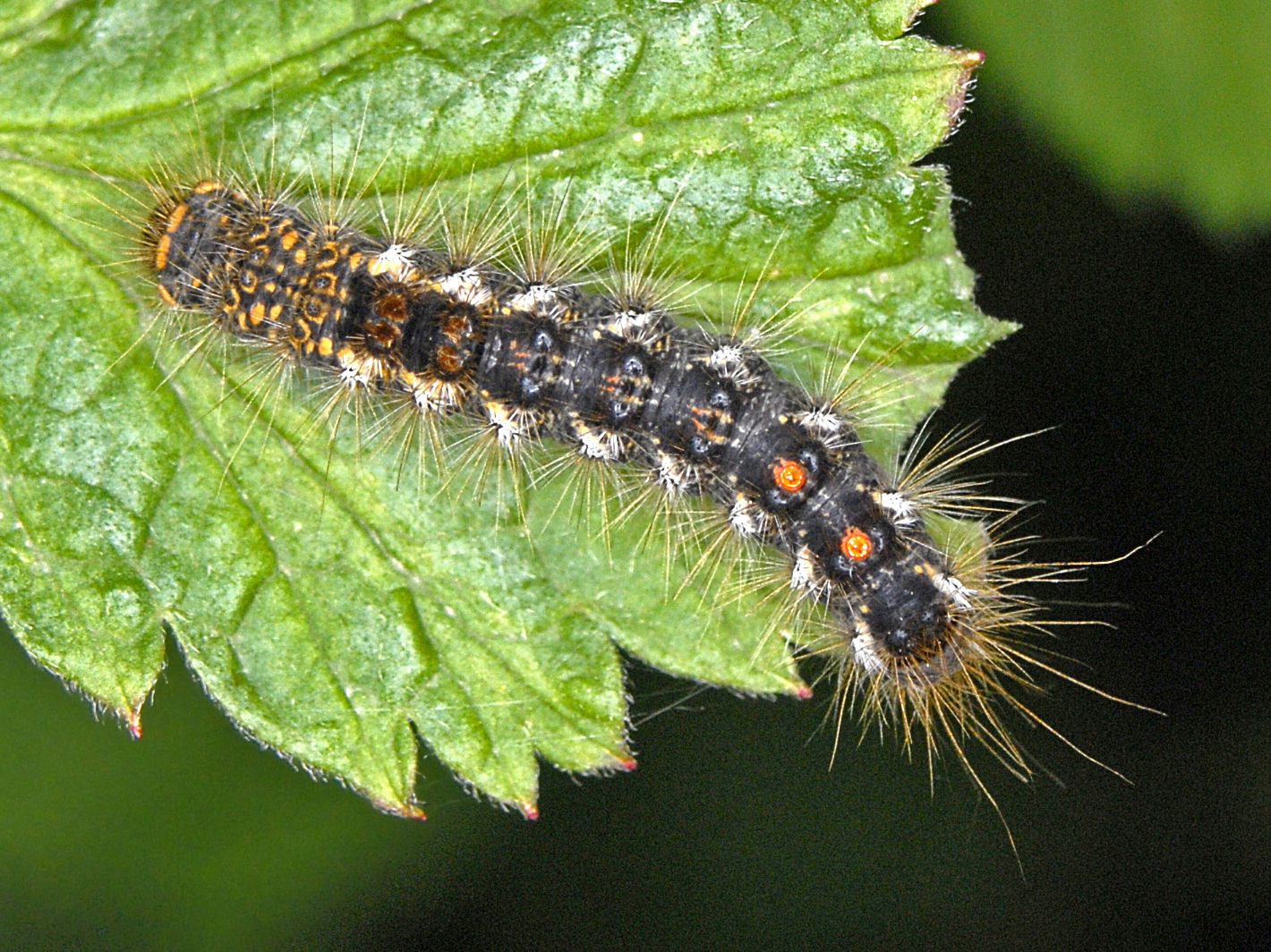
Caterpillar, dorsal view, showing two red dots toward tail end that differentiate it from other hairy caterpillars
