= Patrick Chinnery =

British neurologist

Patrick Chinnery FRS
- Born: Patrick Francis Chinnery; 11 February 1968 (age 58); Leeds, England
- Education: Newcastle University, Cambridge University
- Awards: Foulkes Foundation Medal, 2011, NIHR Senior Investigator, 2010, Fellow of the Academy of Medical Sciences, 2009, Association of British Neurologists, Charles Symonds Prize, 1997 & 2002 Worshipful Society of Apothecaries, Galen Medal, 2022
- Website: www.mrc-mbu.cam.ac.uk/research-groups/chinnery-group

Patrick Francis Chinnery is an English neurologist, clinician scientist, and Wellcome Trust Principal Research Fellow based in the Medical Research Council Mitochondrial Biology Unit and the University of Cambridge, where he is also professor of neurology and head of the department of clinical neurosciences.

In 2023, he was appointed executive chair of the Medical Research Council (United Kingdom). He is co-chair of the National Institute for Health and Care Research BioResource for Translational Research in Chronic and Rare Diseases.

== Early life and education ==
Chinnery attended Medical School at Newcastle University, where he graduated with a Bachelor of Medical Science degree in 1989 with first-class honours; and Bachelor of Medicine, Bachelor of Surgery with honours in 1992. He went on to complete his PhD in mitochondrial genetics in 2000 while training in clinical neurology and neurogenetics.

== Medical career and research ==
Chinnery trained as a physician and neurologist in the north east of England, becoming a member of the Royal College of Physicians in 1995, and completing his specialist clinical training in neurology in 2002 when he was appointed Honorary Consultant Neurologist at Newcastle upon Tyne Hospitals NHS Foundation Trust. He specializes in inherited disorders of the nervous system (neurogenetics) and established the north of England regional neurogenetics service between 2002 and 2015.

In 2015, he moved to the University of Cambridge as Professor of Neurology and Head of the Department of Clinical Neurosciences within the School of Clinical Medicine. He practices as a neurologist at Addenbrooke's Hospital. He became a Fellow of Gonville and Caius College in 2017 where he is Director of Studies in Clinical Medicine.

His research focuses on understanding the role of mitochondria in human disease. He has identified the genetic basis of several new diseases caused by genetic mutations affecting the genetic code within mitochondria (mtDNA) and the nuclear genome which code for mitochondrial proteins. In the first genetic epidemiology study he showed that mtDNA diseases were much more common than expected. People with mtDNA diseases often harbour a mixture of normal and abnormal mtDNA (heteroplasmy). His group showed that most healthy people also carry heteroplasmic mtDNA mutations, but at very low levels. They showed that a dramatic reduction in mtDNA levels within female germ cells during embryonic development leads to major shifts in heteroplasmy levels over one generation (the mitochondrial genetic bottleneck). The bottleneck explains how low level heteroplasmy in carriers can lead to mitochondrial diseases within one generation, and the different severity of mtDNA disease seen in siblings within the same family. Carrying out the first large-scale study in the UK 100,000 genomes project, he showed that the nuclear genetic background also influences the inheritance pattern of mtDNA mutations. He also showed that genetic variation of mtDNA influences the risk of developing common diseases and many human physiological traits, including kidney and liver function.

He has been supported by Wellcome Trust research fellowships since 1995, most recently as a Wellcome Principal Research Fellow. Additional research support has come from the Medical Research Council / UK Research and Innovation, and the National Institute for Health Research.

== Leadership ==
Chinnery was Director of the National Institute for Health Research (NIHR) Newcastle Biomedical Research Centre from 2008 to 2015, leading a doubling of funding. Since 2012, he has been co-chair of the NIHR Rare Diseases Translational Research Collaboration, then the NIHR BioResource with John Bradley.

In 2010, he was appointed Director of the Institute of Genetic Medicine at Newcastle University. In 2015 he moved to the University of Cambridge as Professor of Neurology and Head of the Department of Clinical Neurosciences.

In 2018, he became Clinical Director of the Medical Research Council within UK Research and Innovation, where is he was responsible for clinical translational research programmes.

He has advised two UK Government Chief Medical Advisors, and ministers and Secretaries of State within the Department of Health and Social Care and the Department of Business Energy and Industrial Strategy. In 2020, he was appointed National Core Study Lead for COVID-19 therapeutics by the UK Government Chief Scientific Advisor Sir Patrick Vallance. In 2020, he was asked by UK Government Chief Medical Advisor Professor Chris Whitty to established and chair the UK COVID-19 Therapeutics Advisory Panel (UK-CTAP) which recommended drugs into the UK national clinical trial platforms.

== Awards and honors ==
Chinnery was awarded several prizes as a training neurologist and researcher, twice being awarded the Charles Symonds Prize by the Association of British Neurologists (1997, 2002). In 2009, he was the youngest elected Fellow of the Academy of Medical Sciences, who awarded him the Foulkes Foundation Medal in 2011. He has been a Fellow of the Royal College of Physicians since 2006, and a Fellow of the Royal College of Pathologists since 2007. In 2010, he became a NIHR Senior Investigator (now emeritus), and is a corresponding member of the American Neurological Association. In 2022, he was awarded the Galen Medal by the Worshipful Society of Apothecaries. He was elected a Fellow of the Royal Society in 2024.
