= Jennie Gow =

British broadcaster

- Born: 20 May 1977 (age 49); Southampton, Hampshire, England
- Occupations: Journalist, television and radio presenter
- Employer: BBC / ITV / ESPN
- Spouse: Jamie Coley (m. 2012)
- Children: 1
- Website: jenniegow.co.uk

Jennie Gow (/ɡaʊ/; born 20 May 1977) is an English radio and television presenter and journalist. She was the presenter on BBC Sport's coverage of MotoGP motorcycle racing for 2010. She is currently BBC Radio 5 Live's F1 presenter and pit lane reporter, and F1 correspondent for BBC Sport reporting on BBC News Channel and BBC World Service.

== Early life and education ==
Gow lived in Dorset until her family moved to Wargrave, Berkshire when she was seven. Educated at The Piggott School, Gow took part in local theatre, and enjoyed sport, winning medals as a cox for several different rowing teams.

== Career ==
Gow worked as a chalet maid at a ski resort in France, and then for a day and a half as a temp at the Royal Berkshire Hospital in the filing and records department. She then joined the Henley Standard in 1992.

After studying Media and Communication Studies, she joined BBC Sport in 1999 as a production secretary for Sports Personality of the Century. In 2001, she became Traffic and Travel presenter on BBC Radio Solent, and then moved to the sports team as a journalist covering Southampton, Portsmouth and AFC Bournemouth.

Gow then left the BBC to initially work a brief spell at 107.4 The Quay in Portsmouth before becoming Breakfast Show host on Somerset's Orchard FM. Asked to present the speedway from the Somerset Rebels at Highbridge, a TV producer spotted Gow and asked her to present the FIM World Longtrack Championships. This led to presenting independently produced speedway and motocross productions, broadcast on Channel 4, Sky Sports, Men & Motors and Motors TV. From summer 2004 she became a continuity announcer for ITV, and from 2007 to 2008 for Five, and since 2006 been the presenter of the Jersey Rally. After joining Reading 107 FM, from 2006, Gow became a presenter on Sky Sports, eventually presenting both Sky Sports News and on-line bulletins.

After Suzi Perry decided to retire at the end of the 2009 series, in March 2010, Gow was announced as the new presenter of the BBC's MotoGP coverage, alongside pit reporter Matt Roberts and commentary team of Charlie Cox and former racer Steve Parrish. Gow was replaced by Roberts as main presenter for the 2011 season.

Gow subsequently temporarily filled in for Natalie Pinkham as BBC Radio 5 Live pit lane reporter for the 2011 Canadian Grand Prix, 2011 Hungarian Grand Prix and permanently on role starting 2012 season.

Gow was also reported to be on the BBC's shortlist of possible anchors to replace departing host Jake Humphrey for their F1 coverage across the 2013 season but lost to Perry. She did stand in for Perry on the Friday of 2013 Brazilian Grand Prix as deputy presenter Lee McKenzie was off ill and Perry was filming for the main programmes.

Gow joined ITV4 in 2014 as presenter of the channel's coverage of the FIA Formula E Championship. Following the rights transfer to the BBC in 2018 Gow has also presented the three races each season the BBC shows on BBC Two.

Gow appeared throughout series three of Netflix series Drive to Survive. Since the beginning of 2021, Gow has been the co-commentator for the English language world feed of Extreme E.

On 13 January 2023, Gow announced on social media that she had suffered a stroke, affecting her speech and ability to write. She returned to work part-time in July 2023 covering the British, Dutch and Las Vegas Grands Prix, before full-time as a presenter and correspondent in 2024.
