= Judy Hirst =

Physical Chemist

Judy Hirst FRS FMedSci
- Education: King James's School, Almondbury; Greenhead College
- Alma mater: University of Oxford
- Awards: Fellow of the Academy of Medical Sciences (2019)
- Scientific career
- Institutions: University of Cambridge; Scripps Research Institute
- Thesis: Electron transport in redox enzymes (1997)
- Doctoral advisor: Fraser Armstrong
- Website: www.mrc-mbu.cam.ac.uk/research-groups/hirst-group

Judy Hirst is a British scientist specialising in mitochondrial biology. She is Director of the MRC Mitochondrial Biology Unit at the University of Cambridge.

== Early life and education ==
Hirst grew up in Lepton near Huddersfield, West Yorkshire, and attended King James's School and Greenhead College, Huddersfield. She studied for an M.A. in chemistry at St John's College, Oxford, and then was awarded a Doctor of Philosophy degree at Lincoln College, Oxford, in 1997, for research supervised by Fraser Armstrong on electron transport in redox enzymes.

== Career and research ==
Following her D.Phil., Hirst held a fellowship at the Scripps Research Institute in California, before moving to Cambridge.

As of 2023 Hirst is a professorial fellow and Director of Studies in Natural Sciences Chemistry at Corpus Christi College, Cambridge, and since 2020 has been director of the MRC Mitochondrial Biology Unit having previously been its assistant director (2011-2014) and deputy director (2014-2020). Her main research interest is mitochondrial complex I.

Hirst has been published in 2018 on Open questions: respiratory chain supercomplexes – why are they there and what do they do? and working with Justin Fedor, published research on mitochondrial supercomplexes in Cell Metabolism. Recent research in her team includes a study, published in May 2020 by the American Chemical Society Synthetic Biology on 'Adenosine triphosphate (ATP), the cellular energy currency, is essential for life. The ability to provide a constant supply of ATP is therefore crucial for the construction of artificial cells in synthetic biology' which has developed a 'minimal system for cellular respiration and energy regeneration'.

== Awards and honours ==
Early in her career, Hirst was awarded EMBO Young Investigator Award (2001) and Young Investigator Award from the Royal Society of Chemistry Inorganic Biochemistry Discussion Group (2006).

Hirst was elected a Fellow of the Royal Society (FRS) in 2018. She was awarded an Interdisciplinary Prize of the Royal Society of Chemistry in the same year. In 2019, Hirst was elected Fellow of the Academy of Medical Sciences with the citation:

Judy Hirst, Professor of Biological Chemistry at the MRC Mitochondrial Biology Unit, Cambridge, has had a definitive hand in every advance towards defining the highly complex mechanism of complex I catalysis, and has developed new physical and biochemical methods to address the elusive coupling mechanism between the redox reaction and proton translocation. She established the mechanism of complex I inhibition by the anti-diabetic drug metformin, and has used kinetic and thermodynamic strategies to define how superoxide production by complex I, responds to the intramitochondrial NADH/NAD+ ratio to directly link two pathological effects of complex I dysfunction. This seminal work has brought understanding that is fundamental to critical issues of health and disease on a global stage.

Hirst was awarded Keilin Memorial Lecture and Medal in 2020 for research which:

has made pivotal contributions to understanding energy conversion in complex redox enzymes: how they capture the energy released by a redox reaction to power proton translocation across a membrane, or catalyse the interconversion of chemical bond energy and electrical potential. She is known particularly for her work on mammalian respiratory complex I (NADH: ubiquinone oxidoreductase), an energy-transducing, mitochondrial redox enzyme of fundamental and medical importance, and for solving its structure by electron cryomicroscopy.
