= All Saints Catholic College, Huddersfield =

Voluntary aided school in Huddersfield, West Yorkshire, England

All Saints Catholic College
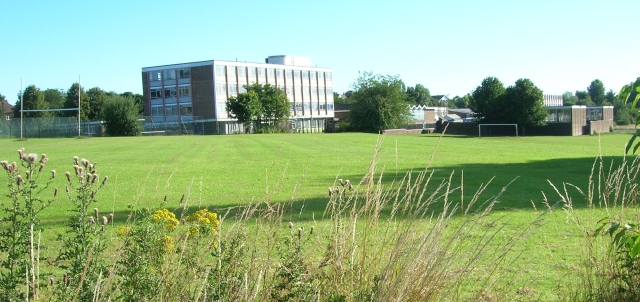

Location
- Bradley Bar; Huddersfield, West Yorkshire, HD2 2JT; England
- Coordinates: 53°40′41″N 1°46′17″W

Information
- Type: Voluntary aided school
- Motto: Love Serve Learn
- Religious affiliation: Roman Catholic
- Established: Academy Convert
- Local authority: Kirklees
- Specialist: Humanities
- Department for Education URN: 107782 Tables
- Ofsted: Reports
- Principal: Karen Colligan
- Staff: Approx. 100
- Gender: Coeducational
- Age: 11 to 16
- Enrolment: 750
- Colours: Red, Yellow, Gray
- Website: http://www.aschc.com

All Saints Catholic College is a Roman Catholic secondary school situated in Bradley Bar, Huddersfield, West Yorkshire, England.

== History ==
All Saints Catholic College was formed as a Comprehensive school in 1973 with the merger of St. Gregory's RC Grammar school and St. Augustine's RC Secondary Modern school, which had previously existed on the same site.

In 2006, it achieved specialist Humanities College status.

In 2009, joint headteachers Mary Nixon and Liam Harron resigned after being suspended for eight months. The duo had made headlines in 2004 when they became joint headteachers of the school, but were suspended 4 years later due to complaints from unions and official bodies.

=== Grammar school ===
Originally, St. Gregory's R.C. Grammar school was run as a catholic voluntary aided grammar school by Huddersfield Education Committee. It had around 500 students in the early 1960s, which rose to 800 by the early 1970s.

== Admissions ==
All Saints takes Catholic students from a number of Primary schools in the Huddersfield and Halifax areas of West Yorkshire. There are also a number of non-Catholic students at the school, and admission is not solely based on religion.

All Saints is a feeder school to a number of local colleges including Greenhead College, Huddersfield New College and Kirklees College.

== Academic performance ==
GCSE results have improved over the last few years with the percentage of students gaining 5 GCSEs at grade A*-C (including English and Maths) rising from 42% in 2010 to 57% in 2013 with the best results ever achieved in 2014 of 63%. This now places the school broadly in line with national averages.

Progress of students has been consistently high in English. Progress in Maths and Science has shown an improvement over recent years.

The school was ranked 18th in Kirklees secondary schools in the 2013 league tables.

Following improved results in 2014, the school is ranked 7th overall in Kirklees, and 4th when selective schools are removed.

== School site ==
The school building is now a huge rectangular, modern school setting with plenty of classrooms including practical rooms and computer rooms. They also have a Learning Resource Centre (LRC) equipped with plenty of books and a computer area. The school also has a PE building which has a large PE hall as well as a fitness studio. There is also an outside court for outdoor PE and there is a field for track and field.

There is currently a Prefect System in place at the school, as well as a Student Council.

== Activities ==
=== Sport ===
The school does generally well in sports events including Rugby, Football and Netball. The school has several competitive basketball teams, which have been successfully recently. The Upper School girls football team won the Yorkshire schools league in 2009.

The original Saint Augustine's excelled in Rugby League and between the mid 1960s to early 1970s won trophies in all age groups from under 12s to under 16s.

=== Choir ===
The All Saints Catholic College Choir recently achieved a bronze medal at the World Choir Games in Austria, having only been together a year. The students met choirs from all over the world and competed against the very best in their category, mixed youth choirs. Also, in November 2012, singers from the school travelled down to London's Royal Albert Hall as part of a massed choir called Huddersfield Fusion to sing in Music For Youth School's Prom 2012.

=== Other clubs ===
A lot of classes have their own type of club there are plenty of choices for years 7-8 to try the things that they would do if they chose to do that subject for their GCSEs (they choose in year 8) and for 9-11 they can do their homework / coursework. There is also a maths club to help the students of all years.

== Notable former pupils ==
- Luther Burrell, England Rugby Union and Rugby League player
- Chris Kendall, Rugby League Match Official
- Jermaine McGillvary, Rugby League Player
- Neil O'Brien, Conservative MP for Harborough and Parliamentary Under-Secretary of State for Primary Care and Public Health
- Geraldine O'Hara, infectious diseases specialist and honorary assistant professor at the London School of Hygiene and Tropical Medicine
- Andy Raleigh, Rugby League player
- Matt Roberts, BBC Sport's Moto GP presenter

=== St. Gregory's R.C. Grammar School ===
- David Miles, Chief Archaeologist from 1999 to 2005 of English Heritage.
