= John Solomon Harris =

World War I Pacifist

- Born: 1866; London, UK
- Died: 1945 (aged 78–79)
- Occupations: Reader/hazzan at princes road synagogue liverpool; minister at hammersmith synagogue
- Spouse: Edith Michaelson
- Children: Hugh Harris, born 1897; Leslie Julius Harris, born 1898

John Solomon Harris (1866–1945) was an English Jewish Pacifist, whose opposition to World War I and support of Jewish conscientious objectors cost him his job as Hazzan and Secretary of Liverpool's Princes Road Synagogue. Harris later abandoned Pacifism during World War II.

== Biography ==
In an era where anti-German and anti-Jewish sentiments often went together, many British Jews feared that opposition to World War I would lead to accusations of disloyalty. The Princes Road congregation, in particular, were keen to seem as British as possible: Harris' Hazzan position was known as "Reader", and could only be held by a British-born son of a British father. His attempts to provide Jewish conscientious objectors with the same support at their Military Service Tribunals as ministers of other religions, together with his sermons and writings in the press, brought him into conflict with his superior Samuel Friedeberg, who strongly supported the war and refused to testify at tribunals.

After losing the support of his congregation in 1916, Harris moved to London where became Minister of Hammersmith Synagogue and wrote a book justifying pacifism on the basis of Jewish Law. He was not charged under the Defence of the Realm Act 1914 although his son Hugh Harris, also a pacifist and conscientious objector, was jailed for refusing conscription.

Harris abandoned Pacifism during World War II, writing that "the cry of the tortured and persecuted victims of the Nazis has been too bitter to deny them what appears to be the only solution of their sufferings and the only alternative to their extermination."
