= Medical Research Council (United Kingdom) =

National medical research agency

Council overview
- Formed: 1913; 113 years ago
- Status: Council within UK Research and Innovation
- Headquarters: Swindon, Wiltshire, England
- Annual budget: £604 million (FY2024/25)
- Ministers responsible: Jonathan Reynolds MP, Secretary of State for Business, Innovation, Science and Trade; Chris McDonald, Minister for Science, Innovation and Investment
- Council executive: Patrick Chinnery, Executive Chair
- Parent department: Department for Business, Innovation, Science and Trade
- Parent body: UK Research and Innovation

The Medical Research Council (MRC) is one of nine councils of UK Research and Innovation (UKRI), a non-departmental public body sponsored by the Department for Science, Innovation and Technology. The MRC is responsible for funding medical research in the United Kingdom and supports world-leading discovery and translational research to accelerate diagnosis, advance treatment and prevent human disease.

Research supported by the MRC has contributed to major scientific advances including the development of penicillin and the discovery of the structure of DNA. Scientists supported by the MRC have received numerous Nobel Prize.

== History ==
The MRC was founded as the Medical Research Committee and Advisory Council in 1913, with its prime role being the distribution of medical research funds under the terms of the National Insurance Act 1911. This was a consequence of the recommendation of the Royal Commissions on Tuberculosis, which recommended the creation of a permanent medical research body. The mandate was not limited to tuberculosis, however.

In 1920, it became the Medical Research Council under Royal Charter. A supplementary Charter was formally approved by the Queen on 17 July 2003. In March 1933, MRC established the British Journal of Clinical Research and Educational Advanced Medicine, the first scientific published medical patrol, as a periodical publication intended to further the progress of science, usually by reporting new research. It contains articles that have been peer reviewed, in an attempt to ensure that articles meet the journal's standards of quality, and scientific validity, allow researchers to keep up to date with the developments of their field and direct their own research.

In August 2012, the creation of the MRC-NIHR Phenome Centre, a research centre for personalised medicine, was announced. The MRC-NIHR National Phenome Centre is based at Imperial College London and is a combination of inherited equipment from the anti-doping facilities used to test samples during the 2012 Olympic and Paralympic Games and additional items from the Centre's technology partners Bruker and Waters Corporation. The Centre, led by Imperial College London and King's College London, is funded with two five-year grants of £5 million from the Medical Research Council and the National Institute for Health and Care Research (NIHR) and was officially opened in June 2013.

=== Notable research ===
Important work carried out under MRC auspices has included:

- the identification of the dietary cause of rickets by Sir Edward Mellanby. Mellanby also carried out human experimentation regarding vitamin A and C deficiencies on volunteers at the Sorby Research Institute;
- the discovery, in 1918, that influenza is caused by a virus;
- the description of neurotransmission and the first neurotransmitter, acetylcholine, by Sir Henry Hallett Dale and Otto Loewi, leading to a Nobel Prize for Physiology or Medicine in 1936;
- the development of penicillin by Sir Alexander Fleming, Sir Ernst Boris Chain and Lord Florey, gaining them the 1945 Nobel Prize;
- linkage of lung cancer to tobacco smoking by Sir Richard Doll and Sir Austin Bradford Hill in the British doctors study, published in 1956;
- the discovery of the structure of DNA by James D. Watson, Francis Crick, Rosalind Franklin and Professor Maurice Wilkins. Three would receive the 1962 Nobel Prize for Physiology and Medicine for their discovery;
- the development of magnetic resonance imaging in 1973 by Professor Peter Mansfield and independently by Paul Lauterbur. This would lead to the 2003 Nobel Prize;
- the development of monoclonal antibodies at the MRC Laboratory of Molecular Biology by César Milstein and Georges Köhler in 1975 (1984 Nobel Prize);
- the development of DNA sequencing by Frederick Sanger of the MRC Laboratory of Molecular Biology in 1977 (1980 Nobel Prize);
- the identification, in 1983, of folic acid as a preventive measure for spina bifida and neural tube defects;
- the conducting of large studies in the 1970s and 1980s which established that aspirin can decrease the risk of cardiovascular disease;
- the publication of the genome of C. elegans, the first multicellular organism to receive this treatment, in 1998;
- the ongoing Heart Protection Study, showing benefits of primary prevention with simvastatin in patients at high risk for cardiovascular disease;
- Dr Venki Ramakrishnan of the MRC Laboratory of Molecular Biology winning the Nobel Prize for Chemistry in 2009 for showing how ribosomes, the tiny protein-making factories inside cells, function at the atomic level;
- the discovery that early treatment of HIV-infected babies with anti-retroviral therapy can dramatically increase their chances of survival;
- the development of a test for detecting infectious prions on surgical instruments which is more accurate than previous tests and 100 times faster;
- the identification of the second ever genetic variant associated with obesity; and
- the finding that high quality surgery combined with a short course of radiotherapy can halve the rate of recurrence of colorectal cancer.

Scientists associated with the MRC have received a total of 32 Nobel Prizes, all in either Physiology or Medicine or Chemistry.

== Organisation and leadership ==
MRC is a council of UK Research and Innovation, a non-departmental public body sponsored by the Department for Business, Innovation, Science and Trade. In the past, the MRC has been answerable to the Office of Science and Innovation, part of the Department of Trade and Industry and the later to the Department for Business, Energy and Industrial Strategy and the Department for Science, Innovation and Technology.

On 1 April 2028, the MRC became part of UK Research and Innovation (UKRI). Day to day leadership of MRC activities is provided by the Executive Chair. The MRC Council advises and supports the Executive Chair on scientific, research and innovation matters and provides independent scrutiny and challenge.

=== Chairmen ===
- 1913–1916: Lord Moulton
- 1916–1920: Major Waldorf Astor
- 1920–1924: George Goschen, 2nd Viscount Goschen
- 1924: E. F. L. Wood, 1st Earl of Halifax
- 1924–1929: Earl of Balfour
- 1929–1934: Edgar Vincent, 1st Viscount D'Abernon
- 1934–1936: Victor Hope, 2nd Marquess of Linlithgow
- 1936–1948: George John Gordon Bruce, 7th Lord Balfour of Burleigh
- 1948–1951: Christopher Addison, 1st Viscount Addison
- 1952–1960: Edmund Pery, 5th Earl of Limerick
- 1960–1961: Viscount Amory
- 1961–1965: Lord Shawcross
- 1965–1969: Viscount Amory
- 1969–1978: Hugh Percy, 10th Duke of Northumberland
- 1978–1982: Malcolm Shepherd, 2nd Baron Shepherd
- 1982–1990: George Jellicoe, 2nd Earl Jellicoe
- 1990–1998: Sir David Plastow
- 1998–2006: Sir Anthony Cleaver
- 2006–2012: Sir John Chisholm
- 2012–2018: Sir Donald Brydon

=== Chief executives ===
As Chief Executives (originally secretaries) served:

- 1914–33: Sir Walter Morley Fletcher
- 1933–49: Sir Edward Mellanby
- 1949–68: Sir Harold Himsworth
- 1968–77: Sir John Gray
- 1977–87: Sir James L. Gowans
- 1987–96: Sir Dai Rees
- 1996–2003: Professor Sir George Radda
- 2003–2007: Professor Sir Colin Blakemore
- 2007–2010: Professor Sir Leszek Borysiewicz
- 2010–2018: Professor Sir John Savill

=== Executive chairs ===
Following the formation of UK Research and Innovation, the executive chair role replaced the chief executive officer role, and has been held by:

- 2018–2022: Professor Fiona Watt
- 2022-2023 (interim post): Professor Sir John Iredale
- 2023–present: Professor Patrick Chinnery

== Institutes, units and MRC Centres of Research Excellence (MRC CoREs) ==
The MRC provides funding to research institutes, units and MRC CoREs across the UK. The MRC also supports research through its units in The Gambia and Uganda.

In 2022, the MRC announced changes to transition the way it funds long-term research through units and centres by introducing a challenge-led, time limited model known as MRC Centres of Research Excellence (MRC CoREs). The new model is intended to support ambitious and interdisciplinary research programmes with the potential to transform biomedical and health research within a 14-year timeframe. The following is a list of the MRC's institutes, centres and units as of June 2024.

Bristol

- MRC Integrative Epidemiology Unit, University of Bristol (IEU)

Cambridge

- MRC Biostatistics Unit, Cambridge (BSU)
- MRC Cognition and Brain Sciences Unit
- MRC Epidemiology Unit, University of Cambridge (EU)
- MRC Laboratory of Molecular Biology (LMB)
- MRC Metabolic Diseases Unit, University of Cambridge (MDU)
- MRC Mitochondrial Biology Unit at the University of Cambridge
- MRC Toxicology Unit at the University of Cambridge
- Wellcome-MRC Cambridge Stem Cell Institute, University of Cambridge

Dundee

- MRC Protein Phosphorylation and Ubiquitylation Unit at the University of Dundee

Edinburgh

- Institute of Genetics and Cancer at the University of Edinburgh
- MRC Centre for Reproductive Health, University of Edinburgh
- MRC Human Genetics Unit at the University of Edinburgh

Exeter

- MRC Centre for Medical Mycology at the University of Exeter

Glasgow

- MRC & CSO Social and Public Health Sciences Unit, University of Glasgow (SPHSU)
- MRC–University of Glasgow Centre for Virus Research

Harwell

- Research Complex at Harwell

London

- Centre for Environment and Health, Imperial College London
- Francis Crick Institute (partnership between the MRC, Cancer Research UK, Imperial College London, King's College London, the Wellcome Trust and University College London)
- MRC Centre for Neurodevelopmental Disorders (at King's College London)
- MRC Centre for Molecular Bacteriology and Infection at Imperial College London
- MRC Centre for Global Infectious Disease Analysis at Imperial College London
- MRC Clinical Trials Unit UCL (CTU)
- MRC Laboratory of Medical Sciences (at Imperial College London)
- National Institute for Medical Research
- MRC Prion Unit at University College London
- MRC Unit for Lifelong Health and Ageing, UCL (home of the National Survey of Health & Development
- MRC Unit The Gambia at London School of Hygiene & Tropical Medicine
- MRC/UVRI and LSHTM Uganda Research Unit

Oxford

- MRC Brain Network Dynamics Unit (at the University of Oxford)
- MRC Molecular Haematology Unit at the University of Oxford
- MRC Translational Immune Discovery Unit at the University of Oxford
- MRC Weatherall Institute of Molecular Medicine at the University of Oxford
- Population Health Research Unit, University of Oxford

Southampton

- Versus Arthritis/MRC Centre for Musculoskeletal Health and Work, University of Southampton
- MRC Lifecourse Epidemiology Unit at the University of Southampton (LEU)

Multiple sites across UK

- Health Data Research UK (central team in London)
- MRC/Versus Arthritis Centre for Integrated research into Musculoskeletal Ageing, Liverpool/Sheffield/NCL (universities of Liverpool, Sheffield and Newcastle) (CIMA)
- MRC/Versus Arthritis Centre for Musculoskeletal Ageing Research (CMAR), Birmingham/Nottingham (universities of Birmingham and Nottingham)
- UK Dementia Research Institute (hub at UCL; centres hosted by universities of Cambridge, Cardiff, Edinburgh, Surrey, Imperial College London and King’s College London)

== Facilities and resources ==
MRC facilities and resources include, as of June 2024: In the UK:

- Better Methods, Better Research guidance portal
- Central Laser facility at the Rutherford-Appleton Laboratory
- Clinical trials data sharing: ReShare (at the UK Data Service)
- Cohort Directory
- Diamond Light Source (UK national synchrotron facility, Harwell)
- Dementias Platform UK
- Electron Bio-imaging Centre at the Diamond Light Source
- Genomics England
- Health Data Research Innovation Gateway
- ISIS Neutron and Muon Source at the Rutherford-Appleton Laboratory
- LifeArc
- Mary Lyon Centre (UK national facility for mouse genetics, Harwell)
- MRC Biomedical Nuclear Magnetic Resonance (NMR) Centre
- MRC Centre for Macaques
- MRC scales (MRC dyspnoea scale; MRC muscle scale; neurological scle)
- MRC-Wellcome Trust Human Developmental Biology Resource (HDBR)
- Regulatory Support Centre
- Research Complex at Harwell
- UK Biobank
- UK Stem Cell Bank
- UK Clinical Research Collaboration (UKCRC) Tissue Directory

International collaborations:

- Beamtime at the European Synchrotron Radiation Facility, France
- Biobanking and Biomolecular Resources Research Infrastructure (European Research Infrastructure Consortium)
- Institut Laue-Langevin neutron source, France
- Instruct – European infrastructure for structural biology (European Research Infrastructure Consortium)

== See also ==
- National Institute for Health and Care Research
