= King James's School, Almondbury =

King James's School
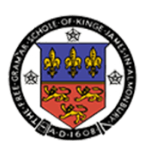

Location
- Saint Helen's Gate; Almondbury, West Yorkshire, HD4 6SG; England
- Coordinates: 53°37′46″N 1°44′32″W

Information
- Type: Academy
- Established: 1547; 479 years ago (royal charter, 1608)
- Local authority: Kirklees
- Department for Education URN: 138706 Tables
- Ofsted: Reports
- Principal: Ian Rimmer
- Gender: Coeducational
- Age: 11 to 16
- Website: www.kingjames.org.uk

King James's School is a coeducational secondary school located in Almondbury in the English county of West Yorkshire.

== History ==
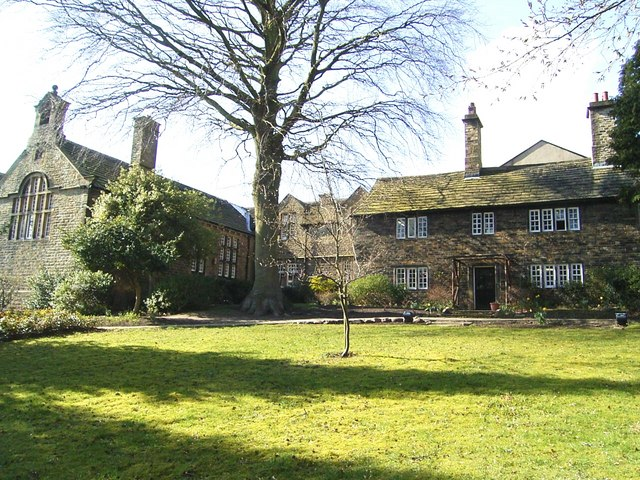
The school library 'The Big' (left) and headmaster's study (right)

King James's Grammar School was founded as chantry school in 1547 and received its name and a royal charter in 1608 thanks to the efforts of three men who travelled on horseback to London to get a royal charter from the king. They rode from Farnley Tyas, the nearby village, having been sent to London to get the charter by the local wealthy men from Almondbury who wanted a local school for their offspring to visit. Extensions were made to the school by William Swinden Barber between 1880 and 1883, in 1938/9 and 1963, and in 2022.

The grammar school era ended in 1976 when it became a comprehensive school: King James's School. The school was designated a specialist Science College in 2004. In September 2012 the school converted to academy status. The current principal is Ian Rimmer.

== The school today ==
King James's School is a comprehensive secondary school with a catchment area that includes Almondbury, Dalton, Grange Moor, Kirkheaton and Lepton. The school offers GCSEs, BTECs and Cambridge Nationals as programmes of study for pupils.

The school made headlines in 2017 after the issuing of its new rule book which contained 40 new rules. These rules claim students were not allowed to smile, look out of the window or use words such as 'dunno' when the school were approached for a comment on their new rules; they declined to comment. Various news sites titled the school 'Britain's strictest school.'

In Easter of 2022, a new building on site was completed after numerous delays in order to accommodate the new students who were previously situated at a different site following the closure of Almondbury Community School.

== Publications ==
The school is the subject of two histories: A History of King James's Grammar School in Almondbury (author: Gerald Hinchliffe) and King James's School in Almondbury: An Illustrated History (editors: Roger Dowling and John Hargreaves).

A book Morning Assembly (editor: Roger Dowling; text: Harry Taylor/Andrew Taylor) gives a detailed account of the life of former headmaster Harry Taylor together with a compilation in facsimile form of some 100 prayers collected by Harry Taylor for use each day at morning assembly.

A book No Beating about the Bush (editor: Roger Dowling) gives a diary-style account of the final teaching year of Head of Latin and deputy Headmaster David Bush.

== Notable former pupils ==
=== King James's Grammar School ===
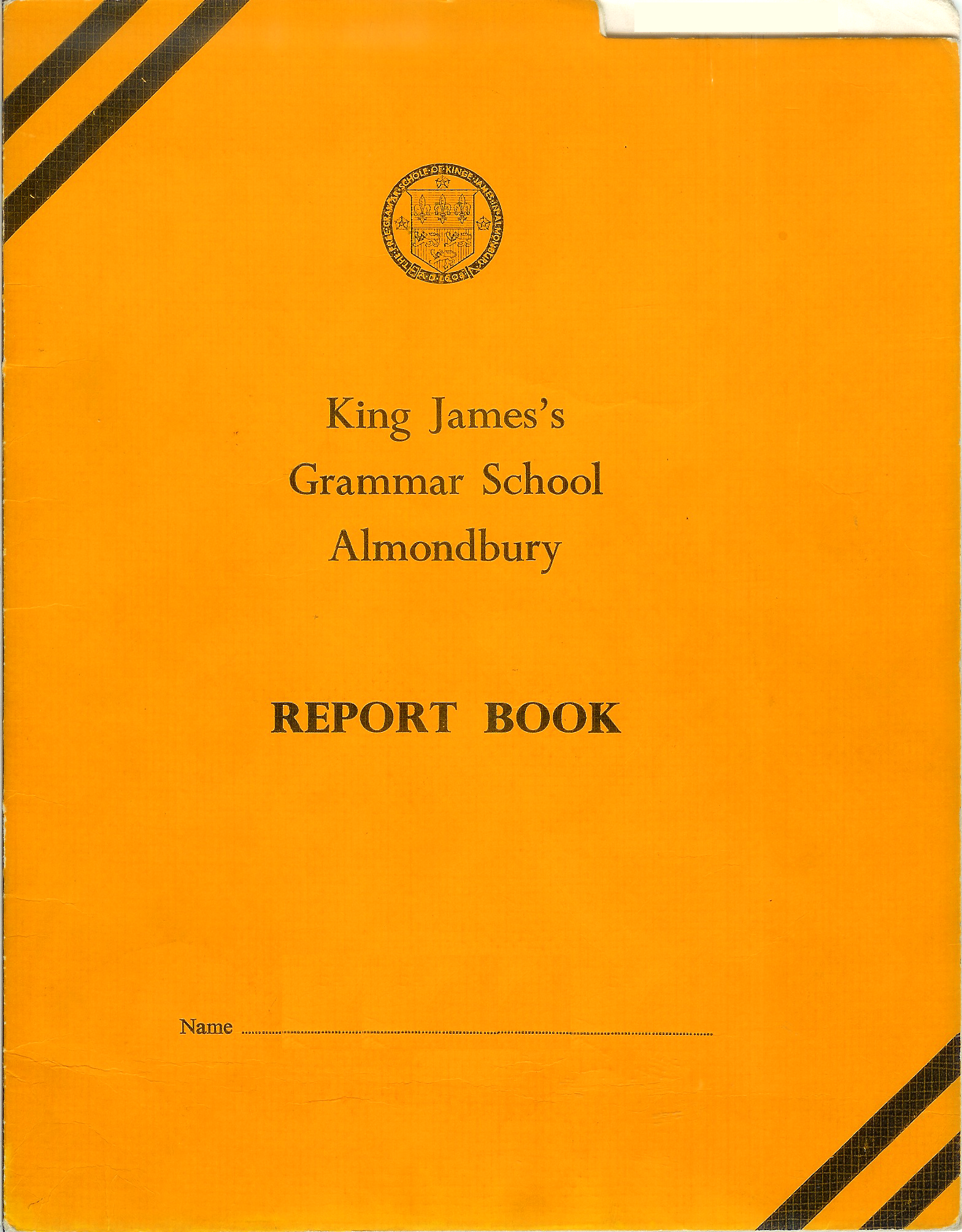
Cover of Report Book from King James's Grammar School Almondbury (student's name redacted)

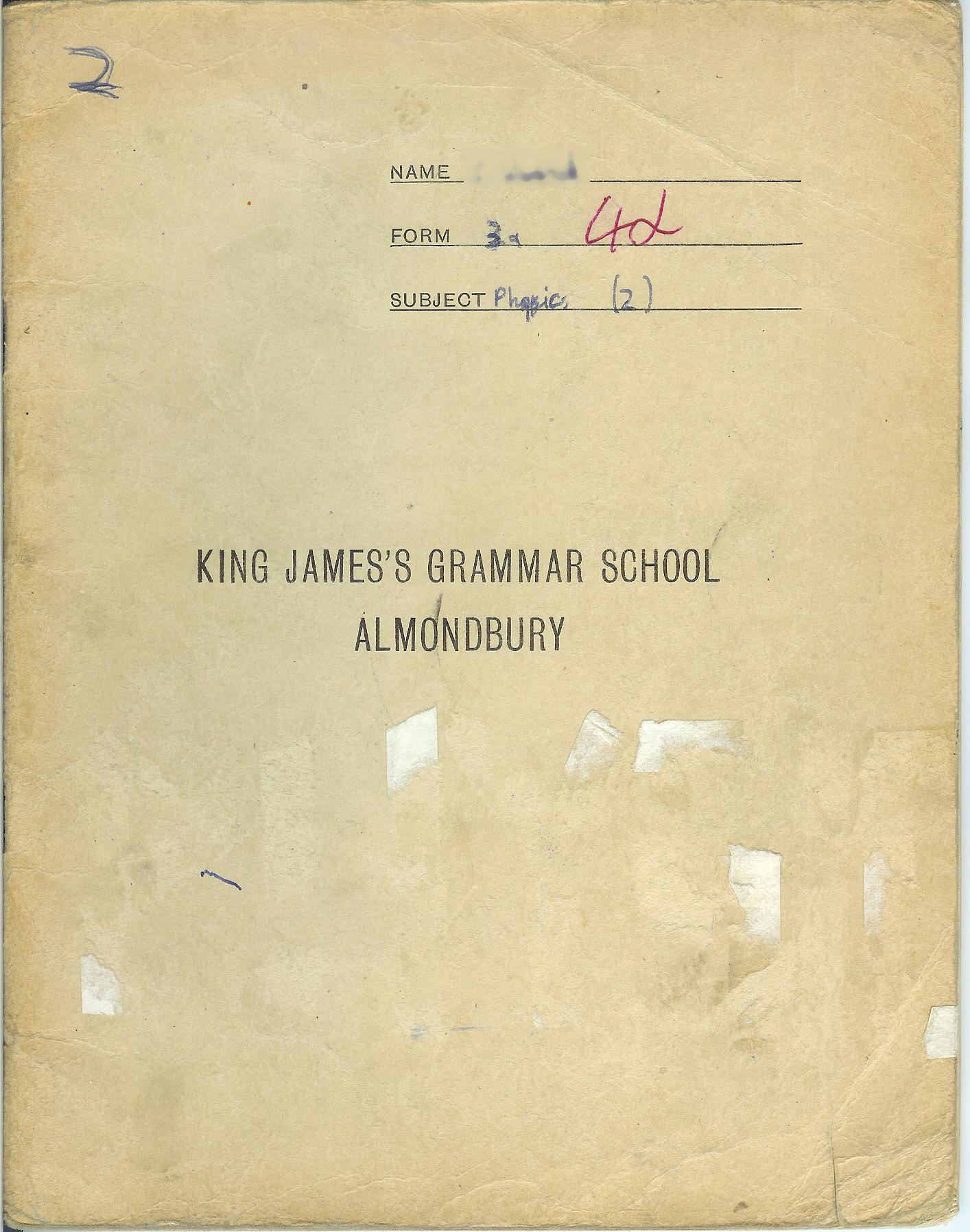
King James's Grammar School custom colour-coded exercise book c. 1972. Chemistry was dark blue, physics (shown here) cream, and so on.

- Felix Aylmer, actor
- Jon Barton, Editor from 1996 to 1998 of Today (Radio 4), and Editor from 1994 to 1996 of the One O'Clock and Six O'Clock TV news
- Sir John George Beharrell, former managing director of the Dunlop Rubber Company and a director of Imperial Airways
- David Brown, Managing Director David Brown & Sons and owner of Aston Martin Ltd.
- Prof Paul Crowther, Professor of Astrophysics, University of Sheffield
- Prof Alex Danchev, military, politics and art historian and biographer
- Maj-Gen Henry Evans CB, Director of Army Education from 1969 to 1972
- Prof Ian Graham Gass, Professor of Earth Sciences at the Open University from 1969 to 1982
- Philip Goldsmith, President of the Royal Meteorological Society from 1982 to 1985
- Michael Hardcastle prolific author of Children's literature
- Sir Harold Percival Himsworth, former Honorary Physician to the Queen
- Prof Judy Hirst, FRS FRSC is a British scientist specialising in mitochondrial biology. She is Director of the MRC Mitochondrial Biology Unit at the University of Cambridge.
- Derek Ibbotson, athlete
- Michael Jackson, writer and beer connoisseur
- Gorden Kaye, actor (star of the BBC Television programme 'Allo 'Allo!)
- Rev Ronald Lancaster, fireworks specialist and founder of Kimbolton Fireworks
- Prof Henry Laycock, Professor of Philosophy at Queen's University, Canada
- Herbert Morley CBE, Director General and Manager of Steel, Peech and Tozer from 1965 to 1968
- David Morphet, author and poet
- Prof Alan Prout, sociologist, University of Leeds
- Ryan Sidebottom, England cricketer
- Jeff Taylor, professional footballer / Nielsen Taylor, opera singer
- Prof Keith Vickerman, Regius Professor of Zoology from 1984 to 1998 at the University of Glasgow
- Prof James Pounder Whitney, Dixie Professor of Ecclesiastical History at the University of Cambridge from 1919 to 1939

== See also ==
- Listed buildings in Almondbury
