= Moor End Academy =

Academy in Huddersfield, West Yorkshire, England

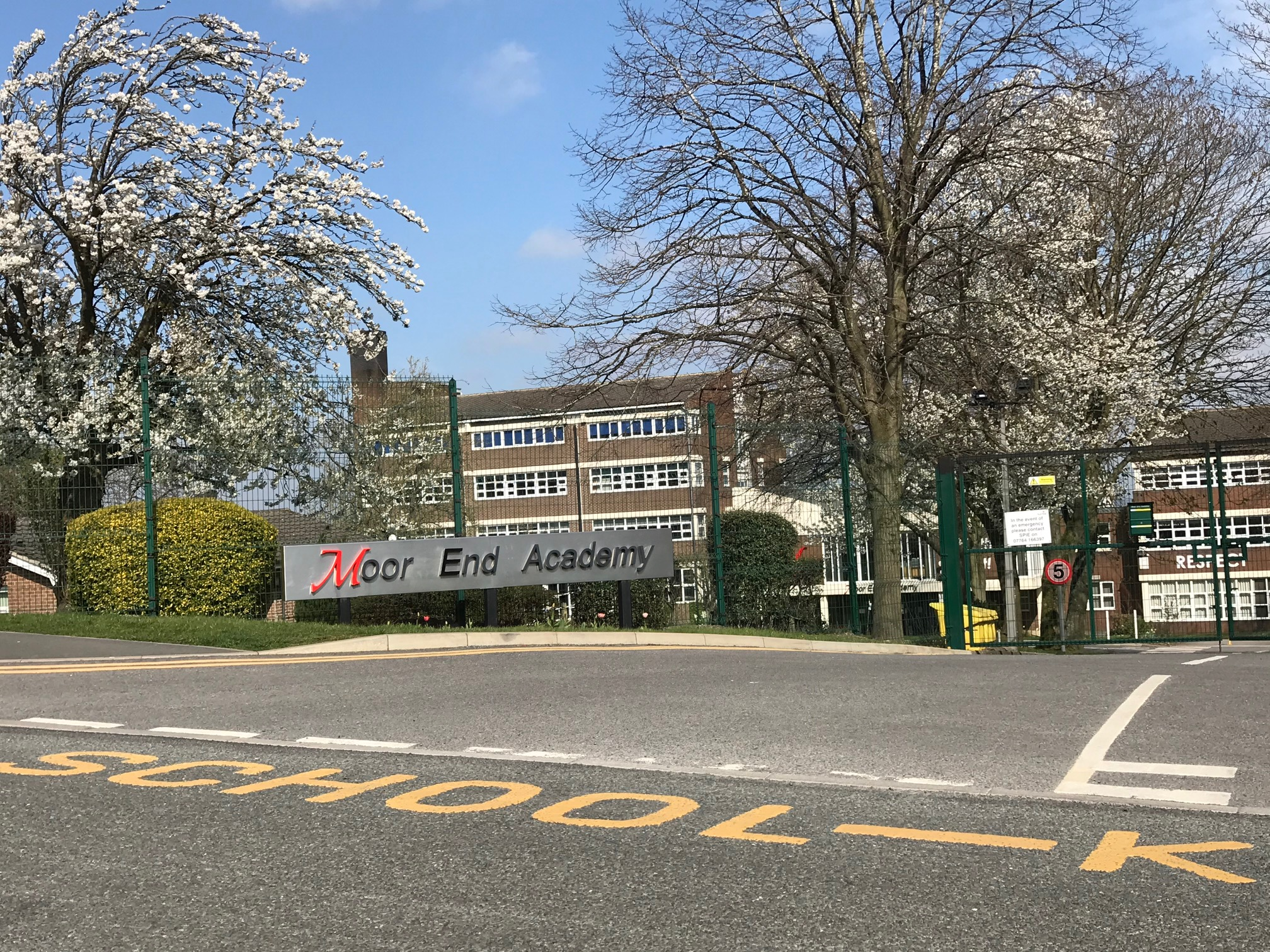
- Moor End building

Location
- Dryclough Road; Huddersfield, West Yorkshire, HD4 5JA; England; 53.629°N 1.810°W

Information
- Type: Academy
- Established: 1972
- Local authority: Kirklees
- Department for Education URN: 137500 Tables
- Ofsted: Reports
- Principal: Natasha Carman
- Age: 11 to 16
- Enrollment: 914
- Trust: South Pennine Academies
- Website: http://www.moorend.org/

Moor End Academy is a converter academy school located in Crosland Moor, Huddersfield in England. It educates students in ages 11–16. The school is operated by South Pennine Academies. The school is rated as 'Outstanding' by Ofsted.

== History ==
The school, that opened in Easter 1972, was originally known as Moor End High School. It became a Technology College, as part of the specialist schools programme, in 1999 and it was renamed to Moor End Technology College. Moor End converted into an academy as a part of the free schools programme, and was renamed again to Moor End Academy in September 2011.

Louise Couzens-Abbot resigned as Chair of Governors, in March 2013, when it was revealed that she was a vice girl.

The controlling body, Moor End Academies Trust, changed its name to South Pennine Academies in July 2017. This was due to the building of a new primary school on Moor End grounds, it was opened in 2016.

Kash Rafiq, a former pupil at the school, was appointed Principal in April 2018, and become 'Executive Principal' after gaining the role of Principal at other schools.

In July 2022, the start time of the school was pushed back by 10 minutes to 8:30, this was in line with Government guidelines set out in the government white paper, Opportunity for All.

== Organisation ==
The school previously had a system of four houses: Beaumont, Castle, Emley, Greenhead. The roles of Head Boy and Head Girl were introduced in the year 2013–14, but were replaced by "Head Student" in 2022.

== Academic standards ==
The latest Ofsted report, following an inspection in June 2012, rated the academy as 'Outstanding', grade 1 of four grades, for 'overall effectiveness' and for each of the four component measures. The report says "High aspirations, outstanding teaching and the rich curriculum result in outstanding achievement. Achievement is outstanding because students consistently make significantly more progress than students nationally in English, science and mathematics."

Following the previous inspection, in September/October 2009, the school was also assessed as being 'Outstanding'.

== Notable former students ==
- Clare Taylor (born 1965), English sportswoman
