= Creative and Media Studio School =

Creative & Media Studio School

Location
- Netherhall Learning Campus; Netherhall Avenue; Huddersfield, West Yorkshire, HD5 9PG; England; 53°39′18″N 1°45′28″W

Information
- Type: Studio school
- Established: 2010
- Gender: Co-educational
- Age: 14 to 19
- Website: studio-school.org.uk

The Creative & Media Studio School is a studio school located at the Netherhall Learning Campus in Huddersfield, in the English county of West Yorkshire, England.

The school was established in 2010. The school was initially housed in the premises of the other schools in the Netherhall Federation; however a dedicated building has been completed and was officially opened on 15 November 2013.

School specialisms include Drama, Music, Textiles, Graphics, Fashion and Media, with qualifications at GCSE, BTEC or A Level.
