= Matt Roberts =

English television presenter

- Born: 5 November 1977 (age 48); Huddersfield, West Riding of Yorkshire
- Education: All Saints High School
- Occupations: Television presenter, Journalist
- Employer: Scunthorpe United F.C.
- Known for: Television presenter and columnist

Matthew Nicholas Roberts (born 5 November 1977) is an English television presenter who specialises in motorcycle racing broadcast to the UK, and is CEO of Scunthorpe United football club.

== Education ==
Roberts attended All Saints High School in Huddersfield as well as Greenhead College and Huddersfield University.

During 2021, Roberts undertook a specialist post-graduate degree known as Master of Sport Directorship at Manchester Metropolitan University.

== MotoGP, Isle of Man TT and Superbike work ==
Roberts has been working in MotoGP since 2001, initially as a writer and then as a commentator. Since 2005 he has expanded his portfolio within the paddock, producing press material for several teams and contributing articles to publications in the UK, Spain, Italy, Germany and the USA.

In addition Roberts has worked extensively on the Isle of Man TT Races. This initially was in the form of conducting rider interviews, however the 2019 coverage saw Roberts taking over as the main anchor from Craig Doyle on the mainstream ITV4 coverage initially with co-presenter Jodie Kidd. Roberts has subsequently gone on to host the coverage alongside Grace Webb.

Roberts worked as a pit-lane reporter at MotoGP races for BBC Sport in 2008 before becoming the main presenter for some rounds in 2009.

In 2009 Roberts shared MotoGP presenting duties with Suzi Perry who presented the European rounds, but Roberts took over for all rounds outside Europe. When handed the responsibility Roberts said "It's a bit different to pit-lane reporting. If I'm interviewing someone or talking to Suzi from the pit-lane then I'm not really thinking about the camera, but with presenting I'm talking straight to it and the people back home and I'm a bit nervous about that."

In 2010 Jennie Gow replaced Perry as the main presenter with Roberts reverting to pit-lane duties, and no longer presenting part-time.

In February 2011, it was confirmed that Roberts would replace the departed Gow as full-time main presenter. His former job in the pitlane was taken by Azi Farni.

After the BBC's contract for MotoGP coverage was not renewed for 2014, Roberts joined Eurosport to anchor their coverage of the Superbike World Championship and the British Superbike Championship alongside James Haydon and fellow Huddersfield native James Whitham.

== Other broadcasting ==
In 2010 and 2011 Roberts hosted BBC Sport's American football coverage of the NFL play-off games. In November 2024, Roberts was appointed as Chief Executive Officer of Scunthorpe United F.C.

== Sports management ==
Roberts has established a partnership and new business with Shane Byrne to mentor young motorcycle racers.

== Personal life ==
Roberts lives in the village of Stainland, Calderdale. He plays football for Huddersfield YMCA in the Yorkshire Amateur League.

Roberts is a supporter of Huddersfield Town. In a MotoGP preview show Roberts interviewed champion racer Valentino Rossi over a game of table football. "I told Rossi beforehand that I was playing with my dream strike force of Gerrard, Gascoigne and Andy Booth. "He picked up on this and in the interview said that after Ibrahimovic, Andy Booth is the number two striker in the world."
