= Netherhall Learning Campus =

Nether Hall Learning Campus

Location
- Nether Hall Avenue; Rawthorpe; Huddersfield, West Yorkshire, HD5 9PG; England
- 53.65515°N 1.75730°W

Information
- Type: Community school
- Local authority: Kirklees
- Department for Education URN: 107756 Tables
- Ofsted: Reports
- Age: 3 to 16

Netherhall Learning Campus is a federation of 4 schools which share the same campus in Rawthorpe, Huddersfield, England. The federation was formed in 2008, and includes Netherhall St. James Infant & Nursery School (formerly Rawthorpe St James CE Infant and Nursery School), Netherhall Junior School (formerly Rawthorpe Junior School), Netherhall High School (formerly Rawthorpe High School) and the Creative and Media Studio School.

== Netherhall High School ==
Originally Rawthorpe County Secondary Modern, the school was built circa 1952. The first Head was "Jack" Timewell who remained with the school until 1975.

Mr Timewell indicated unusual difficulties attendant in the school's establishment. One edge of the school's playing fields overlooks the Kilner Bank. In pre-war times the Kilner Bank had been a local beauty spot. Industrial activity in the Huddersfield's Leeds Road area, particularly wartime munitions production, had left the Kilner Bank (and the playing fields) contaminated with high concentrations of soil copper. Only the importing of grass able to tolerate high copper concentrations, from Canada, enabled the school to have large sports fields adjacent.

The contamination had destroyed most of the tree life on the Kilner Bank and the school participated in an extensive replanting program starting in the early 1970s.

The school had a sixth form, and entered pupils for the GCE A-level examinations whilst still a secondary modern. This continued until three local grammar schools began a phased-transition into sixth form colleges in 1973. Renamed Rawthorpe High School, it lost its own sixth form and became a comprehensive "feeder school". The school continued to enter pupils for the GCE O-level examinations, replacing the Associated Examination Board exams with the far more demanding northern universities Joint Matriculation Board papers in 1974.

As of 1 September 2008 Rawthorpe High School became Netherhall High School, as it joined with Rawthorpe Junior School and Rawthorpe St James CE Infant and Nursery School to become Netherhall Learning Campus. The Netherhall High school is now known for its outstanding contribution to the arts community with their state of the art Music, Art & Design, Photography, Graphics, Textiles and Drama departments.

=== Notable former pupils ===
- Germaine Lindsay — one of the Islamic suicide bombers involved in the 7 July 2005 London bombings
- Paul Scriven — Liberal Democrat Member of the House of Lords and former Leader of Sheffield City Council

== Creative and Media Studio School ==
In 2010 the Creative and Media Studio School was established at the Netherhall Learning Campus, one of the first two studio schools to be established in England.
