= Salendine Nook High School =

Salendine Nook High School Academy
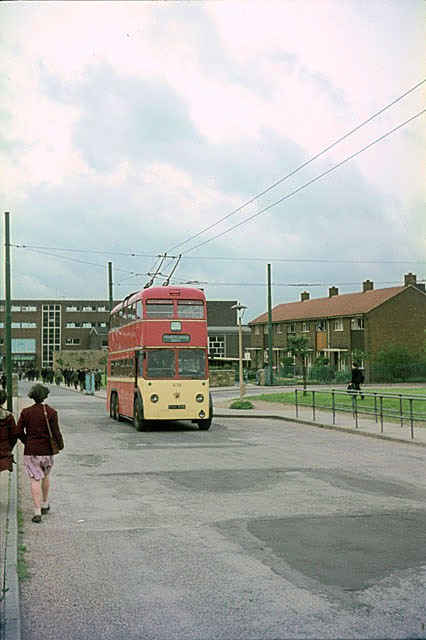
- Trolleybus terminus in front of the then new Salendine Nook High School (1966)

Location
- New Hey Road; Huddersfield, West Yorkshire, HD3 4GN; England; 53.653922°N 1.836695°W

Information
- Type: Academy
- Motto: Aspiration Unity Achievement
- Established: 1956
- Local authority: Kirklees
- Department for Education URN: 137869 Tables
- Ofsted: Reports
- Head teacher: J. Hornsby
- Gender: Coeducational
- Age: 11 to 16
- Enrolment: 1,319 (approx.)
- Houses: Neptune (Blue) Venus (Yellow) Saturn (Green) Mars (Red) Jupiter (Orange)
- Colours: Purple, black and white
- Website: http://www.snhs.kirklees.sch.uk/

Salendine Nook High School Academy is a large secondary school in Huddersfield, West Yorkshire, England. It is adjacent to Huddersfield New College.

== History ==
=== Secondary modern school ===
The three schools at Salendine Nook were designed by architect J G L Poulson of Pontefract. When the school was built, Huddersfield Corporation had a trolleybus terminus built next to it, serving only for the journeys of the school's pupils. This provision was unique in the British Isles.

Salendine Nook Secondary School opened in September 1956 for 600. Huddersfield New College was built to the west of the site, and Huddersfield High School, a girls grammar school, was built to the east. It was part of a campus.

The opening ceremony was performed by HRH Princess Margaret on 14 November 1958. It was the largest school project ever undertaken in the town at that time, covering 65 acres. The ultimate roll was anticipated to be 2,300 and included a swimming pool and accommodation for caretakers.

Work started in December 1955 by James Miller and partners of Edinburgh, costing around £233,000.

=== Comprehensive ===
Most of Huddersfield became comprehensive in 1973.

=== Academy ===
The school formally became an academy on 1 February 2012. This followed a resolution to seek academy status by the school governors at governors meeting on 6 July 2011.

=== School trip ===
The school had 25 pupils stranded in the US in April 2010; they were unable to return home due to the flying ban caused by the Icelandic volcanic ash cloud. The children and four staff went to Florida as part of a physics field trip that was scheduled to last a week but ended up over £15,000 over budget as they had to extend their stay.

== Notable alumni ==
- Zöe Lucker — actress
- Keith Senior — Leeds Rhinos player
- Mona Siddiqui — British Muslim academic
- Mick Walter — actor
- Patrick Kennedy — theatre director
