= MRC Mitochondrial Biology Unit =

Cambridge University medical school department

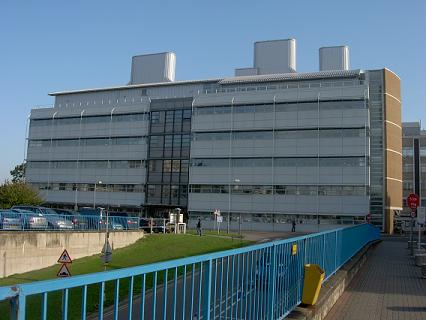
- The Keith Peters Building, housing the Cambridge Institute for Medical Research and the MRC Mitochondrial Biology Unit
- Abbreviation: MBU
- Formation: 1927
- Type: Research institute
- Legal status: University Unit
- Purpose: Mitochondrial research
- Headquarters: The Keith Peters Building
- Location: Cambridge Biomedical Campus, Hills Road, Cambridge CB2 0XY
- Director: Professor Judy Hirst
- Parent organization: Medical Research Council
- Website: MBU

The MRC Mitochondrial Biology Unit (formerly the MRC Dunn Human Nutrition Unit) is a department of the School of Clinical Medicine at the University of Cambridge, funded through a strategic partnership between the Medical Research Council and the University. It is located at the Addenbrooke’s Hospital / Cambridge Biomedical Campus site in Cambridge, England. The unit is concerned with the study of the mitochondrion, as this organelle has a varied and critical role in many aspects of eukaryotic metabolism and is implicated in many metabolic, degenerative, and age-related human diseases.

== History ==
The Unit was founded in 1927 using a donation from Sir William Dunn, who left £1 million to charity on his death in 1912. Part of this money was used to fund what was then called the Dunn Nutritional Laboratory, with its research supported by the Medical Research Council (MRC). Its original research focus was to investigate the role of vitamins in human health. Under the directorship of Egon Kodicek this focus changed to more general nutritional research. The Unit was restructured in 1998 under the directorship of Professor Sir John Walker to focus on mitochondrial research. The Unit was renamed in 2009 to the Mitochondrial Biology Unit to reflect its mitochondrial expertise. In March 2017 the Unit was transferred from the MRC to the University of Cambridge. The current director of the Unit is Professor Judy Hirst.

The Unit has three major scientific aims:

1. To understand the fundamental processes taking place in mitochondria
2. To understand the involvement of these processes in human diseases
3. To exploit knowledge of these fundamental processes for the development of new therapies to treat human diseases

== Research Groups ==
The MBU is organised into nine independent research groups and includes 30-40 graduate students who are members of the University of Cambridge:

- Professor Judy Hirst FRS - Understanding the molecular mechanism of complex I and its roles in human disease
- Professor Patrick Chinnery - Mitochondrial genomics and human diseases
- Professor Edmund Kunji - Understanding transport processes in mitochondria
- Dr Michal Minczuk - Discovering the genetic links between mitochondrial dysfunction and human disease
- Professor Mike Murphy - Targeting therapeutic and probe molecules to mitochondria, mitochondrial radical production and redox signalling
- Dr Julien Prudent - Interactions between mitochondria and the endoplasmic reticulum in cell physiology and disease
- Dr Jelle van den Ameele - Molecular mechanisms of tissue specificity in mitochondrial disease
- Dr Alex Whitworth - Genetic models of neurodegenerative disease
- Professor John E. Walker FRS - Understanding the molecular mechanism of how ATP is made

== Directors ==
Professor Judy Hirst FRS (2020 - )

Professor Massimo Zeviani (2013 - 2019)

Professor Sir John Walker FRS (1998 - 2013)

Dr Roger Whitehead (1973 – 1998)

Dr Egon Kodicek CBE FRS (1963 - 1973)

Dr Leslie Harris (1929 - 1963)

Sir Frederick Gowland Hopkins (1927 - 1929)

== See also ==
- Sir William Dunn Institute of Biochemistry - another beneficiary of Dunn's will
