= List of Cape Wrath characters =

The following are a list of descriptions for characters on the British television series Cape Wrath (Meadowlands in the United States). The complete Cape Wrath series was released on Region 2 DVD on 27 August 2007.

== The Brogans ==
=== Danny Brogan ===
Danny Brogan (played by David Morrissey) is married to Evelyn and father to Mark and Zoe.

Danny's real name was Eddie Foy. Three years before the move to Meadowlands, he opened a bar with the help of an investment from a criminal source. Though the bar was a success he fell in deep with his criminal backers, culminating in his house being set on fire with Mark inside. Eddie was able to get Mark out, though Mark's hands were left badly burned.

Eddie had to testify against his criminal associates and as a result he and his family had to enter a witness protection programme; changing their identities and moving to Meadowlands, a town for people in the witness protection programme.

=== Evelyn Brogan ===
Evelyn Brogan (played by Lucy Cohu) is married to Danny and mother to Mark and Zoe.

Evelyn's real name was Eileen Carrol Foy. A lower middle class girl, she met Eddie when she was seventeen. The two eventually married and had twins, Mark and Zoe, though a fertility test taken by Dr. David York would later suggest that Eddie was infertile and someone else was their father.

Eileen would open a bar with Eddie, though when his criminal backers burned down their house Eddie had to testify against them, and as a result he and his family had to enter a witness protection programme; changing their identities and moving to Meadowlands.

=== Mark Brogan ===
Mark Brogan (played by Harry Treadaway) is the son of Danny and Evelyn, and twin brother to Zoe.

Mark spent his first three weeks in an incubator, and he suffers from mental and behavioral disorders. He is very close to his sister Zoe, and the two instinctively know what the other is thinking.

Though his father was able to get him out of the house when it was set on fire, his hands were badly burnt and as a result he always wore gloves to cover them. Mark was left deeply traumatized after the incident, becoming mute and having Zoe speak for him.

Mark remained mute after the family entered a witness protection programme and moved to Meadowlands. He started to have a strange, voyeuristic relationship and sex with the family's neighbour, Brenda Ogilvie, despite the woman being in her late 40s, and started to speak again upon meeting Brenda's daughter Jezebel. He also began to experiment with cross-dressing, wearing makeup and his sister's clothes.

Mark's real name was Shaun Foy.

=== Zoe Brogan ===
Zoe Brogan (played by Felicity Jones) is the daughter of Danny and Evelyn, and twin sister to Mark.

Zoe's real name was Nikki Foy. She is very close to her brother Mark, and the two instinctively know what the other is thinking.

== Meadowlands neighbours ==
=== Jack Donnelly ===
Jack Donnelly (played by Tom Hardy) is the town's handyman.

Jack's real name was Lawrence Waters. When he was fourteen, he kidnapped a woman, subjecting her to sexual abuse and humiliation, and being aroused by her fear. On the seventh day she died. Being a minor, they couldn't send him to prison So He was then sent to live in Meadowlands under the assumed identity of Jack Donnelly.

=== Freddie Marcuse ===
Freddie Marcuse (played by Don Gilet) is Lori's husband and the personal trainer and fitness guru at the Leisure Centre in Meadowlands, though he secretly works for Samantha Campbell. He once told Mark that he was in Meadowlands because he testified against his criminal father, who later committed suicide, but this was all revealed to be a lie he used to try to gain Mark's confidence.

=== Lori Marcuse ===
Lori Marcuse (played by Sian Brooke) is Freddie's wife and the teacher at the Community Educational Establishment. Like her husband, she secretly works for Samantha Campbell.

=== Brenda Ogilvie ===
Brenda Ogilvie (played by Melanie Hill) is the mother of Jezebel and the Brogans' neighbour. Her real name was Briony Thompson. It was revealed in the last episode that before she had come to Meadowlands, Brenda had been going out with a man who'd asked her out to a party, however when the relationship became serious he mistreated Brenda (then Briony Thompson) and demoralised her and daughter Jezebel calling her chubby. But because he had invited her to parties and social events Brenda loved him because she could be accepted, but that soon turned sour as he'd cover her up.

It was revealed shortly that her partner had been going out late at night, picking up hitchhikers and murdering them. But he had brainwashed Briony into believing he was innocent, and begged her to give him an alibi. When he was caught, Briony was shocked to realise the repercussions of her giving him a false alibi, people hated her for covering it all up and she felt rejected and because of this moved to Meadowlands as Brenda Ogilvie.

In Meadowlands she continued to let her partner lead her life and in her head he was still ordering and shouting at her. In the last episode though, Jezebel gave her a choice 'It's him or me' Brenda chose her daughter. Brenda had also been seeing Mark Brogan, who was a number of years younger than her, at first, she felt bad about the relationship but soon developed feelings for him also then they have sex together. Only for her to discover he'd been sleeping with daughter Jezebel. But Jezebel encouraged Mark to invite her mother to the opening of Foy's and not her. Brenda told Mark everything about her past after he called her 'evil'.

=== Jezebel Ogilvie ===
Jezebel Ogilvie (played by Ella Smith) is the daughter of Brenda and the Brogans' neighbour. She had also been having a relationship with Mark, not realising her mother Brenda was too. Before coming to Meadowlands her mother's partner made fun of her weight and looks. Because of this Brenda has always made sure that people call Jezelbel beautiful because it gets her to build her esteem and believe it for herself. When she found out her mother had also been sleeping with Mark, she was upset but encouraged Mark to invite her to the opening of Foy's bar.

=== Tom Tyrell ===
Tom Tyrell (played by Scot Williams) is an American golfer. Before coming to Meadowlands he was an investigative journalist.

=== Dr. David York ===
Dr. David York (played by Tristan Gemmill) is Meadowlands' primary medical doctor. He is in a dysfunctional relationship with his wife Abigail. When he meets Evelyn the two bond, though David forms an attraction to her that becomes obsessive.

=== Abigail York ===
Abigail York (played by Emma Davies) is David's wife. She believes that David is repelled by her and had an abusive affair with Jack Donnelly, who she said made her feel attractive. She also seems to have a manipulative side.

=== Gordon Ormond ===
Gordon Ormond (played by Sean Harris)

== Meadowlands authority ==
=== Bernard Wintersgill ===
Sergeant Bernard Wintersgill (played by Ralph Brown)

Bernard's real name was Windsong. He was born in a pre-hippy nudist commune with no schooling or parental supervision. When he was twelve, he was deeply traumatized after he was taken to the woods as part of a "walkabout" and given the drug lysergic acid diethylamide.

He is Meadowland's only cop. As a result of his childhood, he believes in control and strictly follows the rules, though he is not above brutality to get his way.

=== Samantha Campbell ===
Samantha Campbell (played by Nina Sosanya) is the person behind Meadowlands.

Her parents were mentally disturbed, keeping her in a small box where she had no interaction with any humans. When she was four, the police rescued her and she was adopted by Professor Campbell. Essentially being a blank slate, he used her to test his theories on consciousness and identity, creating her personality and raising her as his daughter. When she became older, she took control of his Cape Wrath experiment, using the town Meadowlands as an experiment for his theses.

She is Danny's handler, and the one who arranged for him and his family to arrive in Meadowlands.
