= Francis Report =

Often refers to two different reports by Sir Robert Francis:

- Stafford Hospital scandal inquiry, report published in 2013
- Freedom to Speak Up Review, report published in 2015
