= Honours Committee =

Committee of the Government of the United Kingdom

Coordinates: 51°30′13.5″N 0°7′35.8″W

- Ceremonial Honours and Appointments Secretariat

Committee overview
- Formed: 2005 (reorganisation)
- Headquarters: 70 Whitehall, London SW1A 2AS
- Committee executive: Dame Antonia Romeo, Chair
- Parent department: Cabinet Office

The Honours Committee is a committee within the Cabinet Office of the Government of the United Kingdom formed to review nominations for national honours for merit, exceptional achievement or service. Twice yearly the Honours Committee submits formal recommendations for the British monarch's New Years and Birthday Honours. Members of the Honours Committee—which comprises a main committee and nine subcommittees in speciality areas—research and vet nominations for national awards, including knighthoods and the Order of the British Empire.

== History ==
The honours system is an ancient one, particularly in Britain; Æthelstan, King of the English in the 10th century, was knighted by his grandfather, Alfred the Great. Knighthoods were originally conferred as a military honour, often on the battlefield. Later it became customary for only the reigning monarch to bestow the honour. Other honours beyond knighthood were later established, including the Order of the Bath in 1725.

During the 20th century, the "Ceremonial Branch" of the government was created in 1937 with the sole purpose of overseeing the honours system. In 2001, the committee became officially known as the Ceremonial Honours and Appointments Secretariat.

Since 1993, members of the public have been eligible to nominate individuals; government agencies may also formally put forward candidates. All citizens of the United Kingdom and Commonwealth nations can be nominated. Non-citizens are eligible for honorary awards.

Following his retirement as Permanent Secretary to the Lord Chancellor's Office, Sir Hayden Phillips prepared a report in July 2004 to the Cabinet Secretary suggesting a reform of the current honours nomination system. The next year, following recommendations made in Phillips' report, a new system of eight committees was organised, with each committee focussing on a special area. (In 2012, an additional committee was added.) The committees are composed of senior civil servants and independent experts in specific fields. The majority of the honours committees are non-civil servants.

Each subcommittee oversees nominations for its specialised area: Arts and Media; Community, Voluntary and Local Services; Economy; Education; Health; Parliamentary and Political Service; Science and Technology; Sport; and State. The individual committees assess the nominations and pass the nominations to the Main Honours Committee, whose members select the final list of nominations that are passed to the King by the Prime Minister.

Following the Cash for Honours scandal, the Main Honours Committee is required to determine that an individual's nomination for an honour has not been influenced by campaign and political contributions. According to the Cabinet Office's 2011 report, "The Main Honours Committee must satisfy itself that a party political donation has not influenced the decision to award an honour in any way; the committee must be confident that the candidate would have been a meritorious recipient of an honour if he or she had not made a political donation."

The Cabinet's Honours Committee nominates civilians only; military honours, such as the Victoria Cross and the George Cross, are sent to the King by the Honours and Decorations Committee of the Ministry of Defence. The honours committee also does not make nominations for peerages, which are created directly by the monarch.

== Committees ==
(As at 24 August 2026)

=== Main committee ===
- The Cabinet Secretary: Dame Antonia Romeo
- Dame Sarah Healey
- Chair of Arts and Media Committee: vacant
- Chair of Community and Voluntary Services Committee: vacant
- Chair of Economy Committee: Dame Jayne-Anne Gadhia
- Chair of Education Committee: Sir Hamid Patel
- Chair of Health and Social Care Committee: Dame Jane Dacre
- Chair of Parliamentary and Political Service Committee: vacant
- Chair of Public Service Committee: Harris Bokhari
- Chair of Science, Technology and Research Committee: Stephen Kelly
- Chair of Sport Committee: Sir Ron Kalifa
- Chair of State Committee: Dame Anne Rafferty
- Chair of the Diversity and Outreach Committee: Moni Mannings
- The Permanent Under Secretary, Foreign, Commonwealth and Development Office
- The Chief of the Defence Staff

=== Arts and Media ===
- Chair: vacant

==== Independent members ====
- YolanDa Brown - Saxophonist, Broadcaster & Chair of BPI
- Ben Evans - Director of the London Design Festival & Executive Director of London Design Biennale
- Sir Richard Mantle - Cultural administrator, Chair of The Grange Festival, Chair of In Peace or War & former General Director of Opera North
- George Saumarez Smith - Director of ADAM Architecture
- Dr Jo Twist - CEO, BPI
- Lisa Opie - Managing Director, Ubisoft Reflections; Chair, ScreenSkills; Chair, Together TV
- Kate Mosse - Author, Arts Campaigner & Founder, Women’s Prize for Fiction & Women’s Prize for Non-Fiction
- Moira Sinclair - Chair, Clore Leadership and Chair, Factory International
- Indhu Rubasingham - Director, National Theatre

==== Official members ====
- Susannah Storey - Permanent Secretary, Department for Culture, Media & Sport
- Joe Griffin - Permanent Secretary, Scottish Government

=== Community and Voluntary Services ===
- Chair: vacant

==== Independent members ====
- Daryl Brown - Chief Executive, Magpas Air Ambulance
- Melanie Bryan - Founder, WhyNotChange
- Dr Wakkas Khan - Founder, Young Interfaith; Member, Lancashire Cricket Foundation Inclusion Advisory Board; Former Chair, Prince’s Trust Mosaic North West; Former Trustee, Oxfam GB
- Eddie Lynch - Equality, Diversity & Inclusion Group Chair, Abri; Board Member, London Travelwatch; Misconduct Hearings Independent Panel Member, Thames Valley Police
- Ruth Shaw - Independent Consultant, Affleck & Co
- Michelle Mitchell - Chief Executive, Cancer Research UK
- Jane MacLeod - Solicitor; Chair, Developing Young Workforce Argyll; Secretary and Treasurer, Mid Argyll Chamber of Commerce
- Dr Stefan Fafinski - Independent Chair, Parole Board for England and Wales; Chair, Prior’s Court Foundation; Chair, The Inside Out Trust

==== Official members ====
- Susannah Storey - Permanent Secretary, Department for Culture, Media and Sport
- Will Garton - Director General, Ministry of Housing, Communities and Local Government
- Dr Andrew Goodall - Permanent Secretary, Welsh Government

=== Economy ===
- Chair: Dame Jayne-Anne Gadhia (Independent Chair)

==== Independent members ====
- Dr Gerard Lyons - Chief Economic Strategist, Netwealth
- Peter Harrison - Chair Morgan Sindall plc, NED at Lazard Inc and Chair Business in the Community
- Dame Julia Hoggett - CEO, London Stock Exchange
- Steven Cooper - CEO, Aldermore Group; Chair, Experian UK

==== Official members ====
- Amanda Brooks - Interim Permanent Secretary, Department for Business and Trade
- Jonathan Brearley - Permanent Secretary, Department for Energy Security and Net Zero
- Joe Griffin - Permanent Secretary, Scottish Government
- James Bowler - Permanent Secretary, HM Treasury

=== Education ===
- Chair: Sir Hamid Patel - Chief Executive, Star Academies (Independent chair)

==== Independent members ====
- Dame Sally Coates - Director of Secondary Education, United Learning
- Dame Sally Dicketts - President, Association of Colleges
- Sir Martyn Oliver - HM Chief Inspector of Education
- Dame Nicola Dandridge
- Dame Janet Beer
- Clive Lawrence - Chief Education Officer at Esteem Multi-Academy Trust

==== Official members ====
- Jayne Brady - Head of Northern Ireland Civil Service
- Susan Acland-Hood – Permanent Secretary, Department for Education

=== Health and Social Care ===
- Chair: Professor Dame Jane Dacre - Professor of Medical Education, University College London and President, Medical Protection Society (Independent chair)

==== Independent members ====
- Dr Henrietta Hughes - lately National Guardian for the NHS
- Dame Til Wykes - Professor of Clinical Psychology and Rehabilitation, King’s College London
- Dame Ruth Beverley - Lately Chief Nursing Officer for England
- Dame Laura Lee - Chief Executive, Maggie’s
- Sir David Pearson - Lately President of the Association of Directors of Adult Social Services
- Wol Kolade - Managing Partner of Livingbridge, lately Deputy Chair of NHS England and lately Chair of the Guy’s and St Thomas’ Foundation

==== Official members ====
- Professor Sir Chris Whitty - Chief Medical Officer (England)
- Samantha Jones – Permanent Secretary, Department of Health and Social Care
- Judith Paget - Director General, Department for Health, Social Services and Children, Welsh Government

=== Parliamentary and Political Service ===
- Chair: vacant

==== Independent members ====
- Lord McNicol of West Kilbride
- Jonny Oates, Baron Oates
- Professor Stephanie Rickard - Professor of Political Science, London School of Economics
- Craig Stephenson - Trustee, Public Appointee and formerly Director at Welsh Parliament.

==== Official members ====
- Anneliese Midgley MP - Government Chief Whip
- Dame Rebecca Harris MP - Opposition Chief Whip
- Wendy Chamberlain MP - Liberal Democrat Chief Whip

=== Public Service ===
- Chair: Harris Bokhari - Trustee, Natural History Museum, Chair, National Citizen Service Trust (Independent Chair)

==== Independent members ====
- Tariq Shah - CEO, Vigo Group
- Sir David Thompson - Former Chief Constable, West Midlands Police
- Lord Young of Old Windsor - Independent senior corporate adviser; House of Lords Finance Select Committee; former Principal Private Secretary to the Sovereign
- Caroline Underwood - Founder & CEO, Philanthropy Company

==== Official members ====
- Susan Acland-Hood – Permanent Secretary, Department for Education
- Simon Ridley, Second Permanent Secretary, Home Office
- Dr Andrew Goodall – Permanent Secretary, Welsh Government
- Will Garton - Director General, Ministry of Housing, Communities and Local Government
- Dr Jo Farrar - Permanent Secretary, Ministry of Justice

=== Science, Technology and Research ===
- Chair: Stephen Kelly - Chair, Tech Nation (Independent chair)

==== Independent members ====
- Professor Dame Ottoline Leyser – CEO, UK Research & Innovation
- Professor Dame Muffy Calder - University of Glasgow
- Stian Westlake - Executive Chair, Economic and Social Research Council
- Professor Sarah Hainsworth - Pro-Vice-Chancellor for Research, Durham University
- Professor Dame Julia Black - Warden, Nuffield College & Professor of Law and Regulation, University of Oxford
- Professor Nola Hewitt-Dundas - Professor of Innovation Management and Policy & Pro Vice-Chancellor, Queen’s University Belfast
- Dr Shini Somara - Engineer, STEM Broadcaster / STEM Media Produce

==== Official members ====
- Professor Dame Angela McLean - Chief Scientific Adviser to HM Government & Head, Government Office for Science
- Emran Mian - Permanent Secretary, Department for Science, Innovation & Technology
- Professor Jas Pal Badyal - Chief Scientific Advisor for Wales

=== Sport ===
- Chair: Sir Ron Kalifa (Independent Chair)

==== Independent members ====
- Susan Barker - Former television presenter and professional tennis player
- Anthony Hamilton - British racing car manager
- Elena Narozanski - Board member, Football Foundation and Sport England
- Jennie Price - Former CEO of Sport England, Chair, International Tennis Integrity Agency
- Robert Sullivan - CEO, Football Foundation

==== Official members ====
- Susannah Storey - Permanent Secretary, Department for Culture, Media and Sport
- Jayne Brady - Head of Northern Ireland Civil Service

=== State ===
- Chair: Dame Anne Rafferty (Independent Chair)

==== Independent members ====
- Pavita Cooper - Portfolio Non-Executive Director and Chair, 30% Club UK
- Martyn Roper - Former Diplomat, lately Governor of the Cayman Islands
- Tony Poulter - Non-Executive Board member, Department for Transport Board; Civil Service Commissioner; Other NED roles
- Margaret Edwards - Former Chair of the Civil Service Pension Board and Civil Service Commissioner.

==== Official members ====
- Dame Sarah Healey - Permanent Secretary, Department, Ministry of Housing, Communities and Local Government
- Dame Antonia Romeo - Cabinet Secretary
- Dan York-Smith - Principal Private Secretary to the Prime Minister

=== Diversity and Outreach Committee ===
The Committee will assist the committee process in delivering an honours system which is representative of UK society through a programme of policy improvements and interventions; targeted regional and sectoral outreach and publicity of the honours system; and advice to both the independent committees and Government departments.

- Chair: Moni Mannings - Senior Independent Director & Committee Member (Remuneration and Nomination), The Co-operative Group Limited and Land Securities PLC (Independent Chair)

==== Independent members ====
- Lisa Opie – Managing Director, Ubisoft Reflections; Chair, ScreenSkills; Chair, Together TV (Arts and Media Committee)
- Eddie Lynch – Equality, Diversity & Inclusion Group Chair, Abri; Board Member, London Travelwatch; Misconduct Hearings Independent Panel Member, Thames Valley Police (Community & Voluntary Service Committee)
- Dame Julia Hoggett – CEO, London Stock Exchange (Economy Committee)
- Clive Lawrence – Chief Education Officer at Esteem Multi-Academy Trust (Education Committee)
- Wol Kolade – Managing Partner of Livingbridge, lately Deputy Chair of NHS England and lately Chair of the Guy’s & St Thomas’ Foundation (Health and Social Care Committee)
- Craig Stephenson – Trustee, Public Appointee & formerly Director at Welsh Parliament (Parliamentary and Political Service Committee)
- Caroline Underwood – Founder & CEO, Philanthropy Company (Public Service Committee)
- Professor Nola Hewitt-Dundas – Professor of Innovation Management & Policy and Pro Vice-Chancellor, Queen’s University Belfast (Science, Technology and Research Committee)
- Jennie Price – Former CEO of Sport England, Chair, International Tennis Integrity Agency (Sport Committee)
- Pavita Cooper – Portfolio Non-Executive Director & Chair, 30% Club UK (State Committee)

== See also ==
- Honours Forfeiture Committee
