= Siân Brooke =

British actress (born 1980)

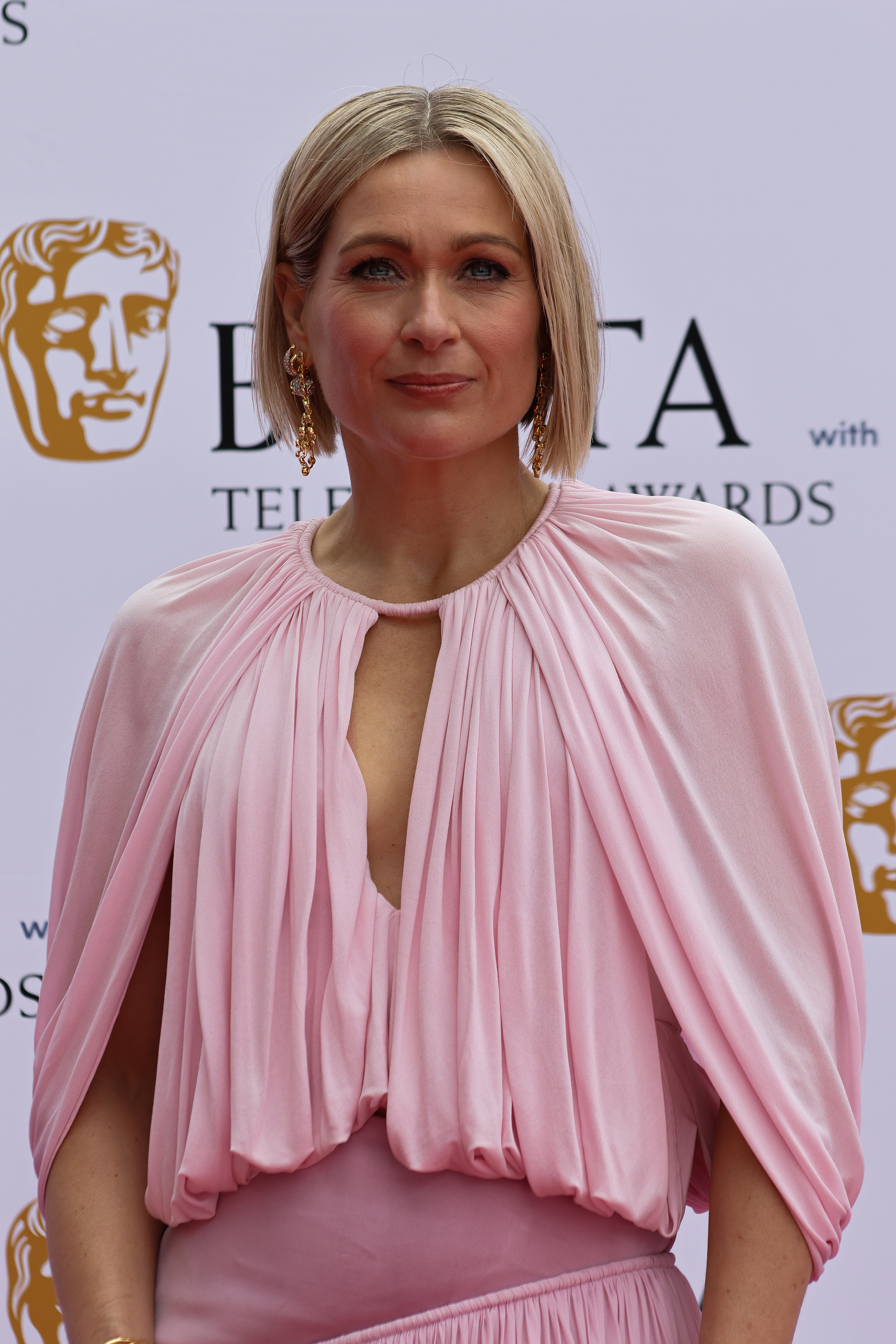
- Brooke at the 2026 British Academy Television Awards
- Born: Siân Elizabeth Phillips; 1980 (age 45–46); Lichfield, England
- Education: Royal Academy of Dramatic Art (BA)
- Years active: 2002–present
- Spouse: Bill Buckhurst
- Children: 2

Siân Elizabeth Phillips (born 1980), known professionally as Siân Brooke, is a British actress. She is best known as Constable Grace Ellis in Blue Lights (2023–present) earning her a BAFTA TV Award for Leading Actress nomination.

Brooke has also appeared in Cape Wrath (2007), Sherlock (2017), Doctor Foster (2017), Good Omens (2019), Guilt (2019), Trying (2020–), and House of the Dragon (2022).

== Early life and education ==
Siân Elizabeth Phillips was born in Lichfield, Staffordshire, England, in 1980 and is the youngest of three siblings. She took on a stage name to avoid confusion with Welsh actress Siân Phillips, choosing Brooke after an English Civil War general Lord Brooke who was killed at Lichfield. She is the daughter of a police officer and a teacher. Her parents are Welsh. Brooke's early education was at The Friary School in Lichfield. She initially joined the Lichfield Youth Theatre at the age of 11 before becoming a member of the National Youth Theatre, and subsequently training at the Royal Academy of Dramatic Art (RADA), graduating with a degree H Level in 2002.

== Career ==
Her acting debut was as Krista in television series Dinotopia in 2002. Brooke's television credits include A Touch of Frost, Hotel Babylon, Foyle's War, and The Fixer. As a child, she was featured in Strangers in Utah with Adrian Dunbar and Phyllida Law. She also played the lead roles of Laura in All About George and Lori Marcuse in Cape Wrath.

Brooke has lent her voice to the radio dramas Murder on the Homefront, A Pin to See the Peepshow, and Dreaming in Africa.

Brooke's theatre work includes Harvest, Dying City, Dido Queen of Carthage, In The Club, The Birthday Party, I’m Not Running and Absolutely Perhaps. She has also appeared in productions of Poor Beck, A Midsummer Night's Dream, King Lear, and Romeo and Juliet, with the Royal Shakespeare Company. From July to August 2008, Brooke played Dorothy Gale in the musical The Wizard of Oz at the Southbank Centre. The production was directed by Jude Kelly. During 2011 at the Almeida Theatre, London, she appeared in Stephen Poliakoff's My City and Neil LaBute's Reasons to be Pretty. From August to October 2015, Brooke played Ophelia alongside Benedict Cumberbatch in the Barbican's production of Hamlet.

In 2017, Brooke starred in the fourth series of the television crime drama Sherlock as Sherlock Holmes' secret sister, Eurus. She initially auditioned for several characters in the show before the showrunners told Brooke that all the characters were one, Eurus, who would be a master of disguise. Michael Hogan, writing for The Daily Telegraph in his review of the third episode of the series, commented that the role was "a star-making turn from Siân Brooke". Later in the year, she appeared with Sheridan Smith and Gemma Whelan in the BBC miniseries The Moorside, based on the kidnapping of Shannon Matthews. She starred as Karen in the first four series of Apple TV series Trying, which has been renewed for a fifth series.

Her lead role performance in the 2023–26 BBC series Blue Lights as Grace Ellis, a mother of a teenager who made the decision in her 40s to leave her job as a social worker to join the Police Service of Northern Ireland, has been critically acclaimed.

== Personal life ==
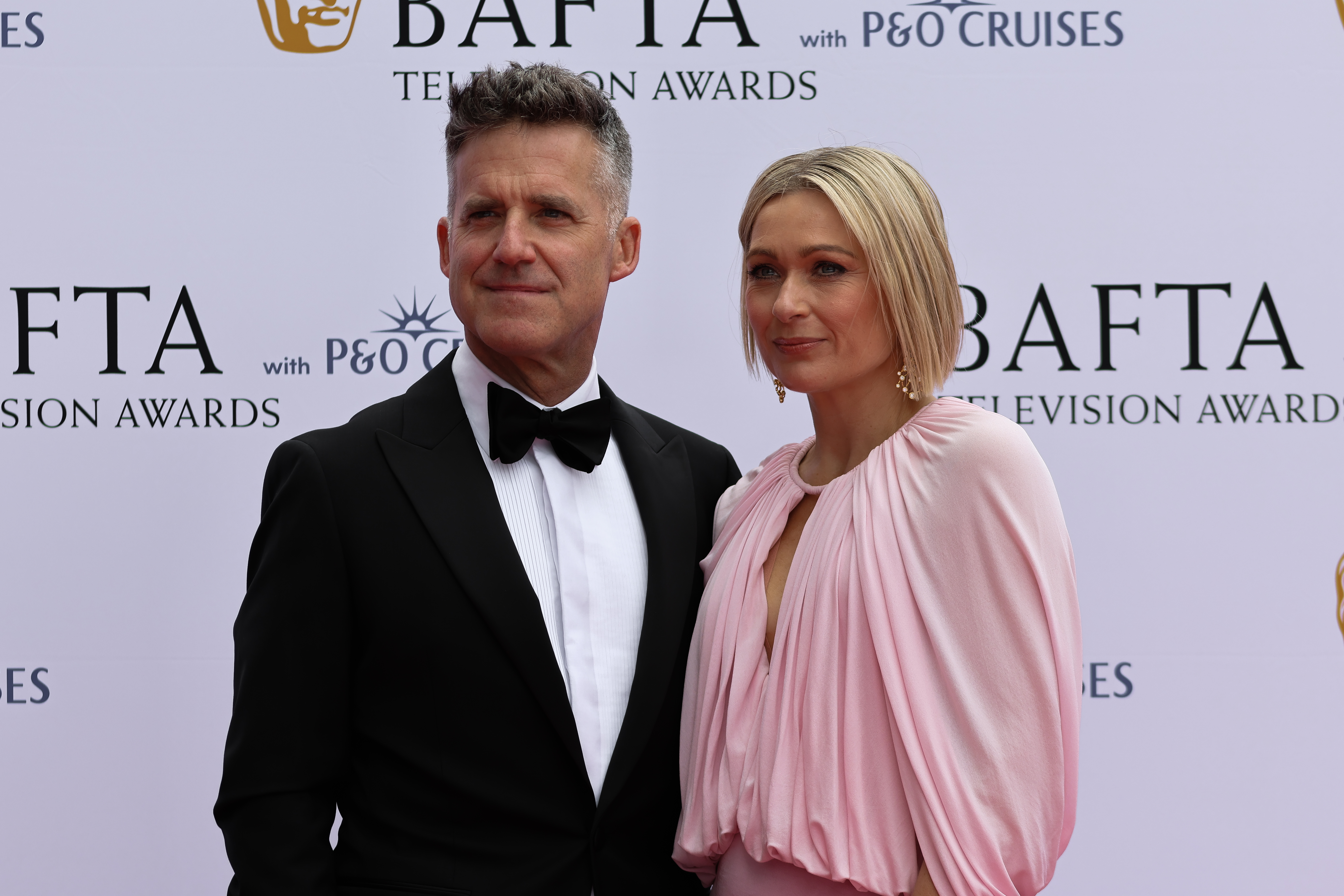
Brooke and Buckhurst in 2026

Brooke is married to Bill Buckhurst, a film, television and theatre director, with whom she has two children. She is an ambassador for the climate change adaptation charity The Glacier Trust.

== Filmography ==
=== Television ===
Year(s)	Title	Role	Notes	Ref(s)
2002–2003	Dinotopia	Krista	5 episodes	
2005	All About George	Laura	6 episodes	
2005	Under the Greenwood Tree	Susan Dewy	Television film	
2006	A Touch of Frost	Carol Haymarsh	Episode: "Endangered Species"	
2006	Housewife, 49	Evelyn Edwards	Television film	
2007	Foyle's War	Phyllis Law	Episode: "Bleak Midwinter"	
2007	Hotel Babylon	Lisa	1 episode	
2007	Cape Wrath	Lori Marcuse	Main cast	
2008	The Fixer	Melrose Cassidy	1 episode	
2008	Midsomer Murders	Christine Turner	Episode: "The Magician's Nephew"	
2008	The Commander	DC Marian Randall	Television film	
2009	Doc Martin	Claire	1 episode	
2010	Vexed	Suzie Miller	1 episode	
2010	New Tricks	Eileen Harrison	Episode: "Dark Chocolate"	
2011	Garrow's Law	Ann Hadfield	1 episode	
2011	Silk	Annie Laidlaw	1 episode	
2013	Man Down	Daisy	1 episode	
2014	Lewis	Jennie Brightway	Episode: "The Lions of Nemea"	
2015	Not Safe for Work	Martine McCutcheon	Main cast	
2017	Sherlock	Eurus Holmes	Main cast (Series 4)	
2017	The Moorside	Natalie Brown	Miniseries	
2017	Doctor Foster	Sian Lambert	Main cast (Series 2)	
2018	The Terror	Sophia Cracroft	Supporting role (Season 1)	
2019	Good Omens	Deirdre Young	Main cast	
2019	Guilt	Claire	Main cast (Series 1)	
2019	The Cure	Julie Bailey	Television film	
2020–present	Trying	Karen	Main cast	
2021	Stephen	Cressida Dick	Miniseries	
2022	No Return	Megan McGee	Miniseries	
2022–2024	House of the Dragon	Queen Aemma Arryn	Episodes: "The Heirs of the Dragon" and "Smallfolk"	
2023–present	Blue Lights	Constable Grace Ellis	Lead role	
2024	Supacell	Victoria Kesh	Television series	
2026	The Undeclared War	Barbara Napier	Main cast (Series 2)	

=== Film ===
Year(s)	Title	Role	Ref(s)
2019	Radioactive	Bronia Sklodowska	
2020	Body of water	Stephanie	

=== Stage ===
Year(s)	Title	Role	Theatre	Notes	Ref(s)
2002	Just a Bloke	Lisa	Royal Court Theatre	7 November – 23 November	
2002	The One with the Oven	Sarah	Royal Court Theatre	7 November – 23 November	
2003	Absolutely! (Perhaps)	Dina	Wyndham's Theatre	7 May – 13 September	
2004–2005	Romeo and Juliet	Juliet	Royal Shakespeare Theatre; Noël Coward Theatre	25 March 2004 – 8 October 2004; 16 December 2004 – 8 January 2005	
2004–2005	King Lear	Cordelia	Royal Shakespeare Theatre; Theatre Royal, Newcastle; Noël Coward Theatre	17 June 2004 – 14 October 2004; 16 November 2004 – 20 November 2004; 13 January 2005 – 5 February 2005	
2004–2005	Poor Beck	Myrrha	The Other Place; Soho Theatre	29 September 2004 – 7 October 2004; 11 March 2005 – 16 March 2005	
2005	Harvest	Laura	Royal Court Theatre	2 September – 1 October	
2006	A Midsummer Night's Dream	Hermia	Theatre Royal, Nottingham; Hackney Empire; St David's Hall	11 February; 12 February; 25 March	
2006	Dying City	Kelly	Royal Court Theatre	12 May – 10 June	
2007–2008	In the Club	Sasha	Hampstead Theatre; Richmond Theatre; Festival Theatre, Malvern; Wycombe Swan; Theatre Royal, Brighton; Belgrade Theatre; New Theatre, Cardiff	25 July 2007 – 25 August 2007; 12 February 2008 – 16 February 2008; 18 February 2008 – 23 February 2008; 25 February 2008 – 1 March 2008; 3 March 2008 – 8 March 2008; 10 March 2008 – 15 March 2008; 18 March 2008 – 22 March 2008	
2008	The Birthday Party	Lulu	Lyric Theatre	8 May – 24 May	
2008	The Wizard of Oz	Dorothy	Royal Festival Hall	23 July – 31 August	
2009	Dido, Queen of Carthage	Anna	Royal National Theatre	17 March – 7 May	
2009	Article 19		Royal Court Theatre	3 July – 4 July	
2010	Wanderlust	Clare Walsh	Royal Court Theatre	9 September – 9 October	
2010	Joseph K	Various	Gate Theatre	11 November – 18 December	
2011	Ecstasy	Jean	Hampstead Theatre; Duchess Theatre	10 March – 9 April; 12 April – 28 May	
2011	My City	Julie	Almeida Theatre	8 September – 5 November	
2011–2012	Reasons to Be Pretty	Steph	Almeida Theatre	10 November 2011 – 14 January 2012	
2013	Tartuffe	Elmire	Birmingham Repertory Theatre	1 November – 16 November	
2015	Hamlet	Ophelia	Barbican Centre	5 August – 31 October	
2018	I'm Not Running	Pauline	National Theatre		

== Awards and nominations ==
Year	Award	Category	Work	Result	Ref.
2020	National Film Awards UK	Best Actress in a TV Series	Good Omens	Nominated	
2026	BAFTA TV Awards	BAFTA TV Award – Leading Actress	Blue Lights	Nominated	
