= National Guardian's Office =

British non-statutory body

The National Guardian's Office is an independent, non-statutory body with the remit to lead culture change in the National Health Service in England.

The appointment of a National Guardian was a recommendation by Sir Robert Francis QC in the 2015 Freedom to Speak Up Review which investigated whistleblower detriment and barriers in the NHS in England.

The NGO's mission is to make speaking up becomes "business as usual" in healthcare.

The NGO uses the term "speaking up" rather than whistleblowing to support healthcare workers to raise ideas for improvement as well as concerns. It defines speaking up as "anything that gets in the way of patient care, or that affects your working life".

The office is sponsored by the Care Quality Commission, NHS England and NHS Improvement.

In July 2025, it was announced that the role of National Guardian would be abolished, but that Freedom to Speak Up guardians would remain in NHS provider organisations.[]

== National Guardian for the NHS ==
The first Freedom to Speak Up National Guardian for the NHS was Eileen Sills who resigned two months after being appointed, citing insufficient time to combine the role with her other work.

She was succeeded Dr Henrietta Hughes OBE, who was appointed in July 2016. Dr Hughes stepped down after five years in post in September 2021 She was subsequently appointed the first Patient Safety Commissioner for England.

Dr Jayne Chidgey-Clark was announced as the third National Guardian for Freedom to Speak Up on 11 November 2021. Her resignation was announced on 4 August 2025, following her absence from post since December 2024.

== National Guardian's Office ==
The National Guardian's Office trains and supports a network of Freedom to Speak Up Guardians throughout the healthcare sector in England. Its remit also includes advising and challenging the healthcare system by describing and sharing good practice and reviewing the way that speaking up is handled.

In response to the report from the Gosport Independent Panel looking into the deaths at Gosport War Memorial Hospital, the National Guardian is required to "publish an independent, annual report to be laid before Parliament to showcase best practice, hold the Government and the system to account and advocate for change."

== Freedom to Speak Up Guardians ==
Freedom to Speak Up Guardians provide an alternative route to support workers to speak up about patient safety issues or workplace matters. There are over 1,200 Freedom to Speak Up Guardians in over 700 organisations in the NHS and independent sector organisations, national bodies and elsewhere in England.

Freedom to Speak Up Guardians are appointed by the organisation that they support and are required to abide by the guidance issued by the NGO. As well as supporting workers, part of their role is to work proactively within their organisation to tackle any barriers to speaking up.

In 2020–21, over 20,000 cases were raised with Freedom to Speak Up Guardians - including nearly 6,000 by nurses and midwives.

By 2024-25 over 38,000 cases were raised annually with Freedom to Speak Up Guardians. They have handled over 172,000 cases since the National Guardian's Office began collecting data in 2017.

In December 2021, the UK's Department of Health and Social Care announced plans to explore ways in which Freedom to Speak up Guardians could be introduced in the social care sector.
