= The Moorside =

- Promotional photograph featuring the cast of The Moorside. L–R: Sian Brooke as Natalie Brown, Sheridan Smith as Julie Bushby and Gemma Whelan as Karen Matthews
- Genre: Drama
- Written by: Neil McKay
- Directed by: Paul Whittington
- Starring: Sheridan Smith; Gemma Whelan; Sian Brooke; Siobhan Finneran
- Country of origin: United Kingdom
- Original language: English
- No. of series: 1
- No. of episodes: 2

Production
- Executive producers: Neil McKay; Jeff Pope; Lucy Richer
- Producer: Ken Horn
- Running time: 60 minutes
- Production company: ITV Studios

Original release
- Network: BBC One
- Release: 7 February – 14 February 2017

The Moorside is a 2017 two-part British television drama. Written by Neil McKay and directed by Paul Whittington, it stars Sheridan Smith, Gemma Whelan, Sian Brooke and Siobhan Finneran and was broadcast on BBC One in two one-hour episodes in February 2017. The drama is based on the 2008 disappearance of 9-year-old Shannon Matthews and the successful search for her by police and volunteers in Dewsbury, West Yorkshire, along with the revelation of mother Karen's involvement in Shannon's kidnapping.

The title is in reference to the Moorside housing estate in Dewsbury, where the Matthews family lived.

== Episodes ==
=== Episode 1 ===
Originally aired 7 February 2017

In December 2007, Karen Matthews (Gemma Whelan) and Julie Bushby (Sheridan Smith) attend a parenting class organised by Kirklees Council. After passing the class, and receiving certificates for doing so, they run into Karen's neighbour Natalie Brown (Sian Brooke) on their way back to their homes on the Moorside estate (an alias for Dewsbury Moor) in Dewsbury. After a brief conversation, the women part with Karen and Natalie making their way home to the Moorside as Julie wishes them both a nice Christmas.

On the evening of 19 February 2008 on the Moorside estate, 9-year-old Shannon Matthews is reported missing by her mother, Karen. As police search for Shannon during the following days, Julie organises a search team of local volunteers, and Detective Constables Christine Freeman (Siobhan Finneran) and Alex Grummitt (Steve Oram) question Karen on Shannon's disappearance. Freeman tells Julie that, due to the increasing probability of Shannon being dead, Karen needs to be prepared for the worst, and police tell Julie to call off the volunteer search, because if Shannon is found dead, the crime scene will need to be preserved, otherwise the investigation may be compromised. However, Julie remains determined that Shannon will be found alive.

As Karen makes emotional appeals to the public for Shannon's return, Natalie becomes increasingly suspicious of Karen's behaviour: among other things, Karen dances to Freeman's phone's ringtone in front of Natalie and the DCs, and smiles during a march for Shannon. On 14 March, news reaches the community that Shannon has been found alive. Shannon is brought to the police station, where Karen identifies her. As Shannon is taken into care, rumours circulate that she was found at the home of Michael Donovan, the uncle of Karen's boyfriend Craig Meehan.

=== Episode 2 ===
Originally aired 14 February 2017

Freeman and Grummitt tell Karen that Shannon was found under a divan bed in a flat belonging to a man named Michael Donovan in Batley Carr. Karen denies knowing Donovan, but Craig's sister and brother-in-law argue that Karen was with Donovan (Craig's uncle) at Craig's father's funeral. While in police custody, Donovan tells police that he and Karen planned to hide Shannon in his flat, and later release her so they could claim the money being offered for her return. Karen admits to Freeman that she knows Donovan but still denies involvement in the crime.

Two weeks after Shannon is found, Craig is arrested after child pornography is found on his computer. Karen's other children are subsequently taken into care. A week later Natalie, still suspicious due to Shannon being found at Donovan's house and Karen being seemingly emotionless at Shannon being found, convinces Julie to come with her to confront Karen. Julie and Natalie meet up with Karen and Freeman in Freeman's car, and a hysterical Karen confesses to knowing where Shannon was during the time she was missing.

Karen is arrested and charged with child neglect and perverting the course of justice. Feeling betrayed, Natalie and other residents of the estate turn against Julie. When Freeman tells Julie that Karen has continued to change her story, Julie visits Karen in custody and tries to persuade her to tell the truth, but Karen continues to blame Donovan for the crime. When Karen and Donovan are put on trial in November, Karen is accused of conspiring with Donovan to fake Shannon's kidnapping in order to claim the reward money, but Karen continues to deny this. Natalie and Julie are called to give statements at the witness stand. Natalie expresses disgust at Karen's actions and lies, while Julie calls Karen "weak, cowardly and a liar" but states that Karen has been "damaged" by years of abuse. Julie adds that she still stands by Karen and will not join in with the "lynch mob" of people who scrutinise Karen to feel better about themselves. Karen and Donovan are found guilty of the kidnapping and false imprisonment of Shannon and perverting the course of justice, and are sentenced to eight years' imprisonment.

After Karen is sent to prison, Natalie moves out of the Moorside estate, having split from her husband. Natalie tells Julie that although she can never forgive Karen for what she did, she still admires Julie for standing by Karen. The aftermath of the events portrayed in the drama are detailed as the drama closes: Julie continued to visit Karen in prison until her release in April 2012.

== Cast ==
- Gemma Whelan as Karen Matthews
- Sheridan Smith as Julie Bushby
- Sian Brooke as Natalie Brown
- Tom Hanson as Craig Meehan
- Faye McKeever as Petra Jamieson
- John Dagleish as 'Scouse' Pete Brown
- Erin Shanagher as Debbie
- Siobhan Finneran as DC Christine Freeman
- Steve Oram as DC Alex Grummitt
- Darren Connolly as Neil Hyett
- Catherine Breeze as Alice Meehan
- Dean Andrews as PC Steve 'Kinchie' Kinchin
- William Hunt as Peter Bushby
- Cody Ryan as Tiffany Bushby
- Sally Carr as Sheryl
- Kirsty Armstrong as Stacey Bushby
- Macy Shackleton as Callie Brown
- Martin Savage as Ian
- Rebecca Manley as Rev. Kathy Robertson
- Paul Opacic as DS Paul Brennan
- David Zezulka as Inspector Ian Gayles
- Bill Maynard as Cecil

== Location ==
While set on the Dewsbury Moor estate (with the thinly veiled alias of the 'Moorside Estate') the drama was filmed on a similar looking inter-war council estate in Wyke, Bradford.

== Critical reception ==
In The Daily Telegraph, Jasper Rees gave the first episode five stars, writing, "[...] it is Smith’s honesty and sensitivity that makes her such an exceptional performer, and those qualities led to another scorching performance tonight in the opening episode of The Moorside [which] derived its stark power from stripped-back performances anchoring the story in reality. Wearing not an ounce of make-up on blanched, puffy cheeks, Smith exuded fiery faith in working-class bonds of loyalty in the face of society’s censure. Her searing intensity, a charismatic ability to pull focus, is what makes her a compelling presence in musical theatre: she seems to walk in her own spotlight".

In The Guardian, Sam Wollaston wrote, "I thought I knew this story. [...] But as he did with his drama Appropriate Adult, about Fred and Rosemary West, writer Neil McKay has found another way into a familiar, awful story". He added, "It's getting boring, plus hard to avoid cliches, when gushing about Smith – her range, her extraordinary humanness, her ability not just to play someone but to inhabit them, to be heroic without being sentimental. [...] Big shout-outs also must go to Sian Brooke (Sherlock's new secret sis) who plays Natalie Brown, the neighbour who begins to suspect Karen before Julie does. And to Game of Thrones's Gemma Whelan, whose Karen is not the evil woman the real one was made out to be – more immature, naive, weak, easily manipulated ... and yet she did manage to con a lot of people for a long time, so she can’t be stupid." Wollaston concluded by saying, "Anyway, The Moorside allows you to make up your own mind. It’s non-judgmental, as well as unsentimental, responsible ... God, I'm making it sound worthy and bland. It isn't, it's convincing and real".

Ellie Harrison, reviewing the first episode for Radio Times, noted, "In The Moorside, the key focus is not the abduction, nor the subsequent arrests, but the tireless hunt for Shannon and the seemingly boundless altruism of Julie Bushby. The BBC drama paints a bleak and evocative picture of the small Dewsbury estate [...]. It perfectly captures the collective feeling of anxiety when a crime like that shakes a small community." Harrison found that, "Gemma Whelan is very convincing in her portrayal of Karen as childlike, as someone who is way out of her depth, deluded and who begins to actually revel in the fame of having a missing child. [...] Karen's character is very purposefully presented as stupid, rather than evil. Smith's performance, though, is the tour de force."

Writing in The Spectator, James Walton began by noting the difficulties in finding a positive outlook on the drama's underlying events, adding, "The Moorside [...] is having a go nonetheless. Although touching at times, the result ultimately proves a rather awkward watch." He recalled that "Karen made a tearful televised appeal for the return of 'my beautiful princess daughter', but ended up serving four years in jail for being an accomplice in Shannon’s kidnapping. With her chaotic taxpayer-funded life, and her seven children by five fathers, Karen was duly turned into a sort of anti-poster girl for the tabloids. The Moorside [housing estate] itself became a symbol, including for David Cameron, of 'our broken society'". Walton found that the programme "sets out, very determinedly indeed, to stand up for the place", but decided that, "The obvious trouble, though, is that Julie’s version of events was completely wrong — and therefore the programme is essentially a portrait of group delusion. Yet, far from seeing itself that way, The Moorside seems not only to share the delusion, but to want us to do so as well."

Reviewing Episode 2 for The Daily Telegraph, Gabriel Tate wrote, "Sheridan Smith has taken the plaudits, and her performance as Bushby in the second episode was if anything even more fiercely convincing than last week, as the extent of Karen Matthews’s deceptions and inadequacies dawned. But Sian Brooke and Gemma Whelan were, in their different ways, her equals". He concluded, "[...] it was the intimate exchanges that really hit home, most notably when Bushby and Brown revealed their histories of sexual abuse to each other, almost by accident. Karen Matthews was a wretch, certainly, but no less a victim. It was hard not to be left wondering whether society does enough to support the marginalised and vulnerable".

== Viewing figures ==
According to the Broadcasters' Audience Research Board, the first episode achieved 9.93 million viewers. The second episode rose to 10.23 million viewers.

== Criticism ==
The Moorside received criticism from the family of Shannon Matthews. Matthews' grandmother told the Daily Mail: "Shannon deserves to live her life in peace. [...] What happened to her was a trauma, a tragedy. It is sick and disgusting that it is being turned into a TV show. It isn't entertainment. [...] If she sees it, Shannon is old enough now to understand that it is about her. [...] How is that fair? It will upset her. They shouldn't be dragging up the past and what happened. [...]". Karen Matthews' cousin told Good Morning Britain that the series "shouldn't go out because it's going to bring everything back. Family members will get grief like they have done in the past, I don't think it should go ahead. [...]". A spokesperson for BBC One said: "This drama is not focused on Shannon Matthews herself. Her abduction is not portrayed, nor are her experiences during the time she was missing. The drama tells the story of the women who led the campaign to find her."
