= Freedom to Speak Up Review =

2015 report on NHS whistleblowing in England

The Freedom to Speak Up Review, also known as the Francis Report, was an independent review into whistleblowing in the NHS in England. It was announced on 24 June 2014 and it was chaired by Sir Robert Francis. The review was originally expected to report in November 2014 but took longer because of a huge volume of input material: 17,500 online responses and 600 postal responses.

The report was published on 11 February 2015.

== Recommendations ==
Francis outlined twenty principles and associated actions, then concluded by making just two recommendations:

1. for all NHS organisations and regulators to implement all the principles and actions;
2. for the Secretary of State to review progress annually.

The twenty principles to allow a consistent approach to raising concerns, while still allowing some flexibility, included:

- Culture of raising concerns - to make raising issues a part of normal routine business of any well-led NHS organisation.
- Culture free from bullying - freedom of staff to speak out relies on staff being able to work in a culture which is free from bullying.
- Training - every member of staff should receive training in their trust's approach to raising concerns and in receiving and acting on them.
- Support - all NHS trusts should ensure there is a dedicated person to whom concerns can be easily reported and without formality, a "Freedom to Speak Up Guardian" .

There are now over 800 Freedom to Speak Up Guardians in over 500 organisations in the NHS and independent sector organisations, national bodies and elsewhere in England.

In 2020-21, over 20,000 cases were raised with Freedom to Speak Up Guardians - including nearly 6,000 by nurses and midwives. An observational and interviewed-based study of more than 80 Guardians found that a lack of resources, especially time, reduced their ability to respond to concerns, and to analyse and learn from data. Guardians struggled to develop their role, and create a more positive culture in which staff felt free to voice concerns. Bullying and harassment was raised with them frequently. Guardians found their role stressful and received little psychological support.

In December 2021, the UK's Department of Health and Social Care announced plans to explore ways in which Freedom to Speak up Guardians could be introduced in the social care sector.

- Support to find alternative employment in the NHS - where a worker who has raised a concern cannot, as a result, continue their role, the NHS should help them seek an alternative job.

== Reactions ==
Many campaigners claimed that the recommendations did not go far enough.

== National Guardian ==
The National Guardian's Office is an independent, non-statutory body with the remit to lead culture change in the NHS, so that speaking up becomes "business as usual". The office is sponsored by the Care Quality Commission, NHS England and NHS Improvement.

In January 2016 Eileen Sills was appointed as the first Freedom to Speak Up National Guardian for the NHS. She resigned two months later, citing that she did not have sufficient time to combine this role with her other work. Dr Henrietta Hughes was appointed as the second Freedom to Speak Up National Guardian in July 2016.

Dr Hughes stepped down after five years in post in September 2021

Dr Jayne Chidgey-Clark was announced as the third National Guardian for Freedom to Speak Up on 11 November 2021.

== See also ==
- Eileen Chubb
- National Guardian's Office
