= Henrietta Hughes =

British medical doctor

- Education: Queen Mary University of London (MBBS)
- Known for: Medical policies
- Medical career
- Profession: Medical doctor
- Field: General practice
- Institutions: National Health Service

Henrietta Hughes OBE FRCGP is a British medical doctor who had served various executive and non-executive roles in the National Health Service. In 2022, she became the first Patient Safety Commissioner, and independent authority set up by the British government for security and protection of healthcare recipients. Primarily working as a general practitioner in London, she had served as the National Guardian for the NHS and a Medical Director at NHS England. She had been a Visiting Professor at the Institute of Medicine, University of Greater Manchester.

== Biography ==
Hughes studied medicine at the Christ Church, Oxford, under the University of Oxford, and graduated in 1987. In 1994, she obtained an MBBS degree from the Medical College of St Bartholomew's Hospital, part of Queen Mary University of London. She became a practising general physician in central London. She had served as member of the Health Honours Committee and the guiding group of the Women's Health and Care Leaders Network. From 2013, she was appointed medical director for NHS England's north central and east London region. She had been a member of the Health Honours Committee and the guiding group of the Women’s Health and Care Leaders Network,

In 2016, she became the National Guardian for the NHS, following the resignation of Dame Eileen Sills, the first to hold that office, who had served only for two months. The National Guardian Office was established by NHS in 2015 for promotion of transparency and whistleblowing in the health services, and Hughes was responsible for maintaining the programme "Speaking Up Freely and Safely" among the health workers and also giving advice on a network of local "freedom to speak up guardians". According the Care Quality Commission, her duty was defined as to "lead a cultural change within NHS trusts and NHS foundation trusts, so that healthcare staff feel confident and supported to raise concerns about patient care at all times." She relinquished her role in 2021.

In 2019, Hughes was listed at number 40 among "Power 50" by Pulse. Hughes is elected Fellow of the Royal College of General Practitioners. In 2020, she was made an officer of the Order of the British Empire (OBE) in the Queen's New Year Honours List 2020. She is chair of Childhood First, a charity for severely traumatised children. She is also a Visiting Professor at the Institute of Medicine, University of Greater Manchester.

In 2022, the Department of Health and Social Care created an autonomous office called Patient Safety Commissioner. Hughes was selected for the position, which she took up since September. Her role was to investigate medical scandals spcifically revealed by Baroness Julia Cumberlege's report "First Do No Harm" in 2020 that recommended creation of an investigating body medical cases involving the careless use of valproate (a drug widely used for treating epilepsy and bipolar disorder), pelvic mesh, and Primodos oral pregnancy tests.
