= Gemma Whelan =

English actress (born 1981)

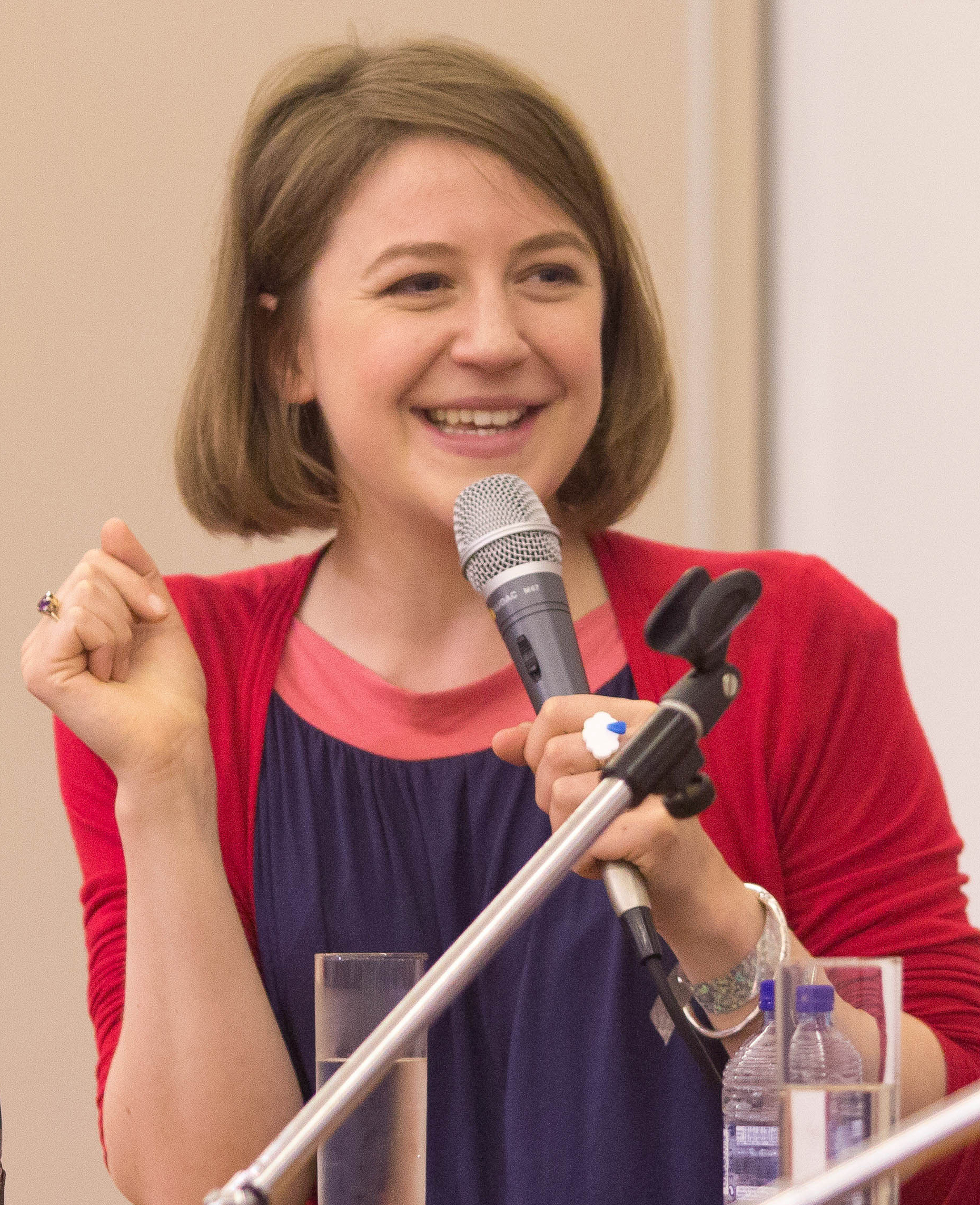
- Whelan at Antwerp Convention 2014
- Born: Gemma Elizabeth Whelan; 1981 (age 44–45); Leeds, England
- Occupations: Actress; comedian
- Years active: 2005–present
- Spouse: Gerry Howell
- Children: 2

Gemma Elizabeth Whelan (born 1981) is an English actress and comedian known for portraying Yara Greyjoy in the HBO fantasy-drama series Game of Thrones and as her stand-up character Chastity Butterworth. She also plays Kate in all 3 series of the comedy Upstart Crow (2016–2018), Detective Eunice Noon on the first series of The End of the F***ing World (2017), Geraldine on the third series of Killing Eve (2020), and DCI Kerry Henderson in both series of DI Ray (2022–2024).

== Early life and education ==
Gemma Elizabeth Whelan was born in Leeds in 1981 and grew up in the Midlands.

She attended The King's High School for Girls in Warwick and the London Studio Centre.

She was hospitalised for anorexia nervosa as a teenager. She regards her recovery from the illness as her greatest achievement, and says that the experience has shaped her personality and how she approaches things.

== Career ==
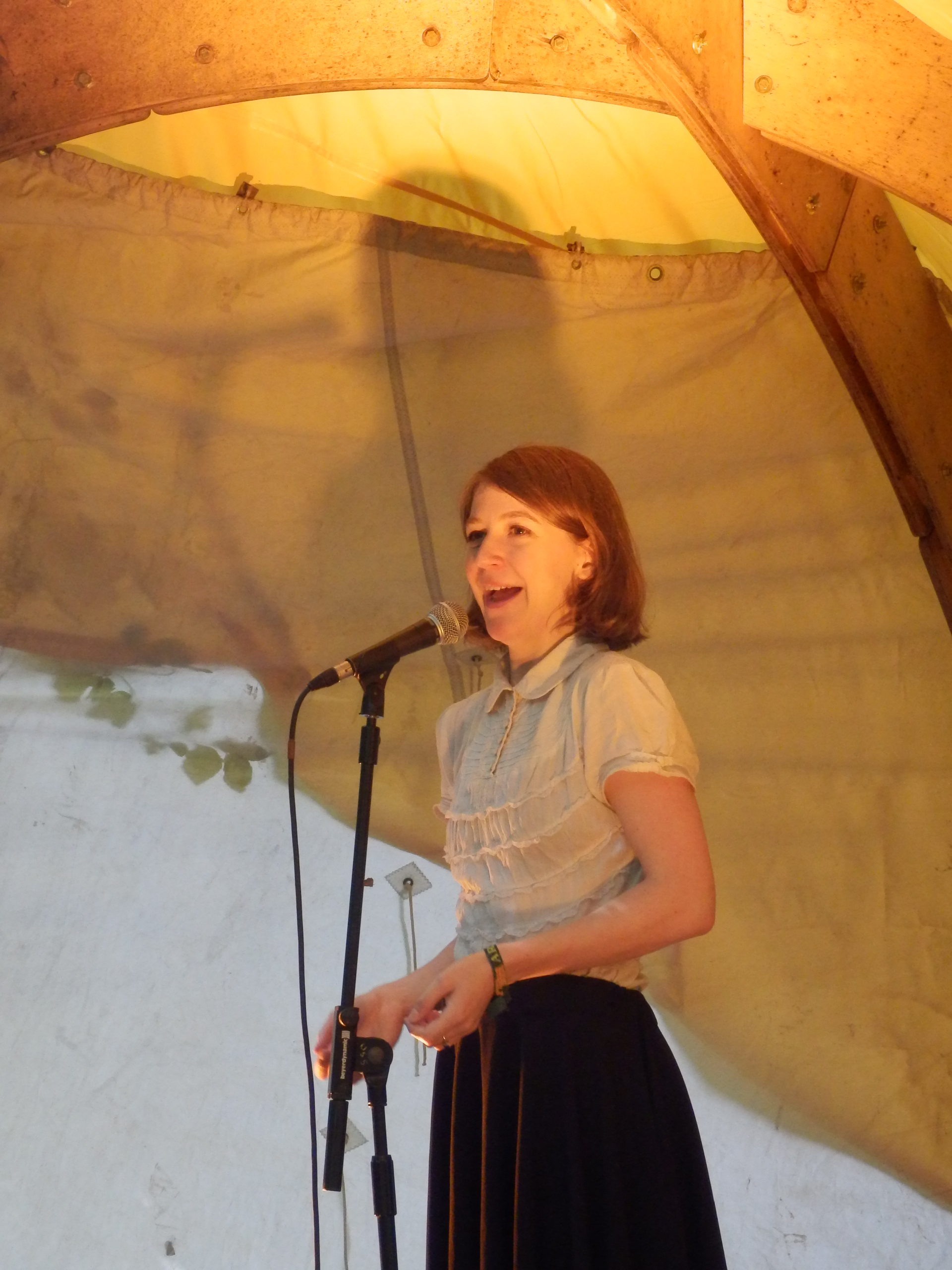
Whelan at the End of the Road Festival, 2013

As a stand-up comedian, Whelan won the 2010 Funny Women Variety Award. She performed at the 2013 Edinburgh Fringe with her show Chastity Butterworth & The Spanish Hamster. In 2014, she recorded a pilot chat show as her character Chastity Butterworth for BBC Radio 4, which was in development in October 2015. She also featured in other shows as this character.

On screen, she has played supporting roles in several films and TV shows, including in the 2010 films Gulliver's Travels and The Wolfman. She played Kate (appearing in all 18 main episodes, as well as two Christmas specials) in Ben Elton's BBC Two comedy Upstart Crow, and was a series regular on The End of the F***ing World. She also played roles in other comedies, including Uncle and The Agency.

In August 2011, she was cast as Yara Greyjoy, elder sister of Theon, of House Greyjoy of the Iron Islands, in the HBO fantasy-drama television series Game of Thrones, and appeared as a recurring cast member from the second season onward.

In 2017, she portrayed Karen Matthews in the two-part TV drama The Moorside, based on the 2008 disappearance of nine-year-old Shannon Matthews. In 2019, she appeared as Marian Lister in the BBC drama Gentleman Jack.

In 2020, she portrayed Mrs Weston née Taylor in a film adaption of Jane Austen's Emma, directed by Autumn de Wilde.

In February 2020, a stage adaptation of Upstart Crow opened at the Gielgud Theatre, London, Whelan reprising the role of Kate. Whelan returned to the West End stage as Kate when the play was revived at the Apollo Theatre in 2022.

Whelan appears as DCI Kerry Henderson in the police drama series, DI Ray, written by Maya Sondhi and produced by Jed Mercurio, as superior officer to DI Ray, played by Parminder Nagra. Her role extends from the first series in 2022 to series 2 in 2024.

== Personal life ==
Whelan lives in London with her husband, the comedian and actor Gerry Howell, and their two children.

In an Instagram post in July 2026, she revealed that her mother, Sue Whelan, died by drowning while overseas in 2025. Whelan described the sudden loss as a "catastrophic shock" and shared about the effects of grief on her life while also underlining that she is "happy and fulfilled and smiling most of the time". She also wrote:

"I suppose I'm looking to say that if you're in a similar position of sudden loss and reeling from shock, as I continue to, you're not alone. What terrible things we can endure, and be ok in the not ok".

== Filmography ==
=== Film ===
Year	Title	Role	Notes
2006	Madness of the Dance	Sister Grace	Short film
2008	Frites	Marie-Anne	Short film
2008	Shortbread and Tea	Mildred	
2009	Ding Dong	Dr. Pretty	Short film
2010	The Wolfman	Gwen's Maid	
2010	Gulliver's Travels	Lilliputian Rose	
c. 2011	Like Buses	Girl 1 on bench	Short film dir. by Gary Keller, written by James Acaster (Available to watch on YouTube)
2014	Santageddon	Gemma	Short film
2016	Prevenge	Len	
2016	Wise Girl	Noodles	Short film
2017	The Blue Door	Caretaker	Short film by Megan Joyce Pugh and Ben Clark of 13th Door Films with ALTER (Available to watch on YouTube)
2017	Tad the Lost Explorer and the Secret of King Midas	Tiffany / Henchwoman (voice)	English version
2017	Keyed Alike	Coley	Short film
2017	Sump	Kate	Short film
2018	Surviving Christmas with the Relatives	Miranda	
2020	Emma	Miss Taylor / Mrs. Weston	
2021	Hireth	Eve (voice)	Short film
2026	7 Miles Out	Bryn Westbourne	
TBA	The Last Disturbance of Madeline Hynde		Post-production

=== Television ===
Year	Title	Role	Notes
2006	The Enforcers	Holly	
2009	10 Minute Tales	Pretty Nurse	Episode: "Ding Dong"
2010	The Persuasionists	Josephine	3 episodes
2011	Threesome	Wendy	Episode: "It's Not Cheating"
2011	Living Doll	Moaning Mona	
2011	For the Win	Various	Pilot
2012	Comedy Blaps	Bar Waitress / Lost Woman in Park / Girlfriend	2 episodes: "Dr. Brown: Episodes 1 & 2"
2012	Ruddy Hell! It's Harry & Paul	Various	Series 4; Episode 5
2012	Cardinal Burns	Claire	
2012–2019	Game of Thrones	Yara Greyjoy	Recurring role, 16 episodes
2013	The Day They Came to Suck Out Our Brains!	(unknown)	Mini-series; Episode: "The Wrath of Ken"
2013	Nick Helm's Heavy Entertainment	Various	
2013	Claudia O'Doherty Comedy Blaps	Sarah	Mini-series, 3 episodes
2014	Live at the Electric	Chastity Butterworth	3 episodes
2014	Siblings	Ruth	Episode: "Vet Drugs"
2014	Badults	Juliet	Series 2; Episode 2: "Neighbours"
2014	Mapp & Lucia	Quaint Irene Coles	3 episodes
2014–2016	Almost Royal	Narrator (voice)	13 episodes
2015	Asylum	Journalist	Mini-series; Episode: "Strange Bedfellows"
2015	The Art of Foley	Pippa	Mini-series; 3 episodes
2015	Not Safe for Work	Davina	Mini-series; Episode 5
2015	Murder in Successville	Nurse Adele	Episode: "Dr. Death"
2015–2017	Uncle	Veronica	5 episodes
2016	Comedy Playhouse	Chloe	Series 17; Episode 2: "Broken Biscuits"
2016	Morgana Robinson's The Agency	Kat Cassidy	7 episodes
2016–2018	Hetty Feather	Ida Battersea	14 episodes
2016–2020	Upstart Crow	Kate	Recurring role, 18 episodes and 3 specials
2017	Decline and Fall	Diane Fagan	Mini-series; 2 episodes
2017	The Moorside	Karen Matthews	Mini-series; 2 episodes
2017	The Crown	Patricia Campbell	Series 2; Episode 5: "Marionettes"
2017	Queers	Bobby	Mini-series; Episode 7: "The Perfect Gentleman"
2017	The End of the F***ing World	DC Eunice Noon	5 episodes
2017	Eat Your Heart with Nick Helm	Herself	1 episode
2017–2022	Horrible Histories	Various	7 episodes
2018	Danger Mouse	Ego (voice)	Series 2; Episode 29: "For Your Insides Only"
2019	Star vs. the Forces of Evil	Additional voices	Series 4; Episode 20: "Pizza Party/The Tavern at the End of the Multiverse"
2019–2022	Gentleman Jack	Marian Lister	16 episodes
2020	White House Farm	Ann Eaton	Mini-series; 6 episodes
2020	Untitled Pajama Men Project	Glenda	
2020	Killing Eve	Geraldine Martens	Series 3; 6 episodes
2021	Frayed	Hannah	Series 2; 2 episodes
2021	Inside No. 9	Columbina, a Maid	Series 6; Episode 1: "Wuthering Heist"
2021–2024	The Tower	DI/DS Sarah Collins	Main role, 11 episodes
2022–2024	DI Ray	DCI Kerry Henderson	10 episodes
2024	Cristóbal Balenciaga	Prudence Glynn	6 episodes
2024	Inside No. 9	Party Guest	Series 9; Episode 6: "Plodding On"
2024	Funny Woman	Lynda Jay	Series 2; 2 episodes
2024	The Cleaner	Lara	Series 3; Episode 2: "The Baby"
2025	The Famous Five	Gertrude Drachmann	Episode 5 "Big Trouble on Billycock Hill"

=== Stage ===
Year	Title	Role	Notes
2005	Newsrevue	Various	Edinburgh Festival
2006	Shakespeare for Breakfast	Petruchio	C Venues
2006	Celebrity Love Panto Island	Various	Canal Cafe Theatre
2008	Red Death Lates	(unknown)	Gideon Reeling
2008	Improvathon	Bunny Valentine	The Sticking Place
2009	Infinite Variety	Various	Whoopee Productions New Players Theatre
2010	Stephen & the Sexy Partridge	Chanel	Trafalgar Studios
2013	One Man, Two Guvnors	Rachel Crabbe	Royal National Theatre
2013	Dark Vanilla Jungle	Andrea	Supporting Wall & Pleasance Theatre
2013	Chastity Butterworth & the Spanish Hamster	Chastity Butterworth	Pajama Men Productions
2014	Dark Vanilla Jungle	Andrea	Supporting Wall
2015	Radiant Vermin	Jill and others	Soho Theatre
2019	Pinter Seven: A Slight Ache	Flora	Harold Pinter Theatre
2020	The Upstart Crow	Kate	Gielgud Theatre
2024	Underdog: The Other Other Brontë	Charlotte Brontë	National Theatre

=== Video games ===
Year	Title	Role	Notes
2013	Soul Sacrifice	Terrwyn	Voice roles
2014	Dragon Age: Inquisition	Threnn / Maryden / Winterwatch Tower Cultist / Redcliffe Soldier / Redcliffe Villager / Emerald; Graves Civilian / Svarah Sun-Hair - Jaws of Hakkon DLC / Avvar - Jaws of Hakkon DLC	Voice roles
2015	Final Fantasy XIV: Heavensward	Igeyorhm / Vidofnir	Voice roles
2015	Dragon Age: Inquisition - Trespasser	Maryden	Voice roles
2015	Guitar Hero Live	(unknown)	Voice roles
2017	Mass Effect: Andromeda	Pathfinder Zevin Raeka	Voice roles
2017	Warhammer 40,000: Dawn of War III	Eldar	Voice roles
2021	Final Fantasy XIV: Endwalker	Ameliance / Galene	Voice roles
2022	Elden Ring	Lady Tanith	Voice roles
2026	The Sinking City 2	Faye Bennett	Voice roles
TBA	Squadron 42	Becca Farneway	Voice and motion capture

=== Audio ===
Year	Title		Role	Notes
2013	Vienna	Episode: "The Memory Box"	Mead	
2013	Counter-Measures Series 2	Episode: "Manhunt"	Emma Waverly	
2013	Counter-Measures Series 2	Episode: "Sins of the Fathers"	Emma Waverly	
2013	Doctor Who: The Monthly Adventures	Episode: "Persuasion"	Casta / Sylph / The Khlecht	
2021	Dalek Universe 1	Episode: "Buying Time"	The Meddling Nun	
2021	Dalek Universe 1	Episode: "The Wrong Woman"	The Meddling Nun	
2021	Doctor Who: The Ninth Doctor Adventures Series 1	Episode "Fright Motif"	Zazie Vincent	
2021	Missy Series 3: Missy and the Monk	Episode: "Two Monks, One Mistress"	The Meddling Nun	
2025	Harry Potter: The Full-Cast Audio Editions		Pomona Sprout	
2026	Dark Gallifrey: The Meddling Monks		The Meddling Nun	

== Awards and nominations ==
Year	Award	Category	Work	Result	Ref.
2010	Funny Women Awards	Best Variety	Herself	Won	
2016	Screen Actors Guild Award	Outstanding Performance by an Ensemble in a Drama Series	Game of Thrones	Nominated	
2017	WFTV Awards	The MAC Best Performance	Herself	Won	
