= Sold (TV series) =

- Genre: Comedy drama
- Starring: Kris Marshall; Bryan Dick; Christina Cole; Dan Johnston; Ella Smith
- Country of origin: United Kingdom
- Original language: English
- No. of series: 1
- No. of episodes: 6

Production
- Executive producer: Rob Pursey
- Producer: Philip Trethowan
- Production company: Touchpaper Television

Original release
- Network: ITV
- Release: 15 November – 20 December 2007

Sold is a British comedy drama television series produced by Touchpaper Television for ITV. The series stars Kris Marshall and Bryan Dick as Matt and Danny, employees of Colubrines Estate Agents] It is written by Steve Coombes and was broadcast between 15 November and 20 December 2007.

== Characters ==
- Danny, played by Bryan Dick — An estate agent "with a heart ... who makes [buyers' and sellers'] dreams come true."
- Matt, played by Kris Marshall — Danny's colleague, who seeks to exploit people for their money.
- Mr. Colubrine, played by Anthony Head — The owner of the company. Head bases his performance on Alan Sugar.
- Mel, played by Christina Cole
- Phoebe, played by Ella Smith
- Jonty, played by Dan Johnston

== Production ==
Filming began in the week beginning 25 June 2007 in and around London. It is directed by Cilla Ware and distributed internationally by RDF Media. Prior to the announcement of the series, it was referred to by RDF as "Homeboys". The set for the estate Agents was The Pub Studio in Battersea London.

== Episodes ==
No.	Title	Original release date	Viewers (millions)
1	"Episode 1"	15 November 2007	4.44
As the new flagship store opens, Danny is given just a few weeks to prove himself at Colubrine’s – or find a new job. His heartless colleagues relish his initial failure as he enrages a house hunting couple by exposing the husband’s infidelity, and upsets a struggling single mother already at her wits’ end. The rest of the gang will stop at nothing to make a sale as they compete with each other for commission. It is opening day at the flagship branch of "the fastest growing estate agency in the South East" but the Colubrine’s gang arrive at their new office to find themselves locked out. That’s because Danny (Bryan Dick), the only remaining member of staff from the agency that Colubrine’s has recently bought out, is busy showing a prospective buyer Kate around her dream house. There Danny glimpses Kate’s heart’s desire – to have a baby and a family home with her husband, Richard. Danny returns from his viewing to a less than warm welcome from his new boss, Matt (Kris Marshall). As he is introduced to his colleagues, Danny realises that Colubrine’s operate by a very different ethos to the one he’s used to.
2	"Episode 2"	22 November 2007	4.27
Matt is consumed with jealousy as the gang speculate on what happened between Danny and Mel after the Colubrine’s Big Night Out, much to Danny’s amusement. Mr Colubrine surprises his employees by appearing via webcam in the office, a new innovation allowing him to check in on his staff at any moment. Singling out Matt, he demands to be shown the properties they have for sale and is unimpressed by the empty display window. The gang must find property to sell – and fast. Left to hold the fort at the office while the team contrive to sign up more vendors, Danny is accosted by two sexy young sisters, first-time buyers pooling their resources and determined to secure his undivided attention. Phoebe heads off to local rival estate agents, Bonvilles, where she goes undercover as a buyer and is quickly shown around a succession of increasingly fabulous homes by Gavin, a sexy young estate agent. But as Gavin flatters and flirts with Phoebe, it is not just the properties she is falling for.
3	"Episode 3"	29 November 2007	3.1
Charged with the sale of Ellesmere Hall, Mel has her eyes set on the big prize, but risks more than anticipated when she falls for potential buyer, millionaire strip-club owner, Paul. Matt gets in over his head with his latest marketing scam involving the local school, but it is Danny who feels the repercussions as he struggles to find the perfect home for a single mother and her son. And hapless Jonty is bullied by the work experience kid. Ultimately the gang must pull together to save Matt’s job – and Mel’s pride.
4	"Episode 4"	6 December 2007	2.2
Danny’s troubled childhood comes back to haunt him when he shows a couple around his old family home and then discovers that developers are digging up his father’s grave. Matt sees this as an opportunity to make a fast buck, but his scheming backfires when Mel sides with Danny. Selling off an old gothic house ripe for redevelopment, Phoebe and Jonty are haunted by a different kind of ghost. At a brainstorming session presided over by Mr Colubrine (Anthony Head), the gang are each under pressure to impress the boss with a new idea to increase Colubrine’s market dominance. Only Matt’s (Kris Marshall) idea is greeted with enthusiasm when he proposes they concentrate their efforts on developing disused buildings and land for residential use. Back at the office the next day, Matt is alarmed to find Mr Colubrine keenly pursuing this idea and anticipating immediate results.
5	"Episode 5"	13 December 2007	2.3
The Colubrine’s team have secured a lucrative contract to handle sales for the Bay Tree Court Development. With just two more remaining flats on the site to be sold, Matt is in a triumphant mood, boasting to Mel that he’s destined for great things, but she’s distracted by Danny. Disturbed by their flirtatious banter, Matt charges them with the sale of the last two flats. The next day, Mel’s promising viewing at Bay Tree Court is interrupted when she discovers Jonty squatting in the show flat. He reveals that his house has been repossessed and, ashamed at being a homeless estate agent, has been camping at Bay Tree Court. When Phoebe hears of his plight, she offers to let him stay with her, a proposition that Jonty misreads as a sign of growing affection. Mr Colubrine drops a bombshell – the Bay Tree Court deal demanded a fifth of the flats be sold to key workers, something Matt had failed to realise. The gang find themselves up against the clock with just one week to find the necessary new buyers for Bay Tree Court or risk losing Colubrine’s valuable contract and wrecking their relationship with the influential developer, Lord Derek. Everyone is now focused on finding nurses and firefighters to buy these flats – against his will, Danny gets on board and leads the team in a fresh approach to selling the flats: an unusually honest and upfront approach which sees the team succeed at the eleventh hour. Saved by Danny’s last minute intervention, Matt is rewarded by Mr Colubrine at the Colubrine’s Big Night Out. But it is a hollow victory for Matt as he realises that things are hotting up between Mel and Danny.
6	"Episode 6"	20 December 2007	2.3
The gang are in relaxed mood in the office, all except for Matt who is notably unhappy at the easy and flirtatious teasing between Mel and Danny. The atmosphere is broken, however, by Mr Colubrine’s webcam announcement that he is opening a new flagship branch in Almeria – and he’ll be selecting a manager to oversee the Spanish office. The heat is on to impress the boss and land the plum job. In her efforts to impress Mr Colubrine, an enterprising Mel, who had promised to steal somebody’s business lease, succeeds in poaching the very office in Almeria that Mr Colubrine had earmarked for his flagship branch. Naturally, this earns Mr Colubrine’s full attention – prompting him to make a shock visit. A tax exile, he is making a flying visit to the UK, throwing the office into panic. While Matt remains convinced he is the man for the job, Mr Colubrine has designs on another member of staff, Mel, who has quietly proved herself worthy of the top job. Mel and Danny argue when she announces that she is seriously considering the job offer in Spain. Later, thanks to Matt’s manipulating, Danny clashes with his mother once more and learns some startling truths. At the final Colubrine’s Big Night Out of the series, the gang are brought together for some shocking revelations.

== Reception ==
The programme opened with strong ratings, securing 4 million viewers for the first and second episodes. That number had halved by the final episode. Writing in The Guardian, Gareth McLean called it "so atrocious in every possible way – from its dire script through cartoonish characters to music that will have you hankering for tinnitus".
