= All About George =

Television series

All About George is a British family "comedy drama" which followed the extended family of George Kinsey (Rik Mayall). The characters included five generations, from George's grandmother (Edna Doré) to his first granddaughter, Jasmine. One six-episode series was made; it aired in 2005. The Evening Standard's television editor Terry Ramsey described the show as "a swan among TV dramas; on the surface smooth and unruffled, and almost uninvolving; yet underneath those plots are working like mad to keep us interested."

== Cast ==
- Rik Mayall as George Kinsey
- Julia Ford as Annie Kinsey, George's current wife and mother of his son Ben
- Jack Shepherd as Gordon Kinsey, George's father
- Gemma Jones as Kay Kinsey, George's mother
- Aidan McArdle as Dave Kinsey, George's brother
- Edna Doré as Lily Kinsey, George's grandmother
- Penny Downie as Evelyn Kinsey, George's ex-wife and mother of his daughters Laura and Amy
- Sian Brooke as Laura Kinsey, the elder of George and Evelyn's daughters; mother to Jasmine
- Gemma Lawrence as Amy Kinsey, the younger of George and Evelyn's daughters
- Rory Jennings as Russell, Annie's son from a previous relationship
- Toby Mills Zivanovic as Ben Kinsey, George and Annie's son
- Christopher Simpson as Ash
- Lorraine Burroughs as Jess
- Clare Thomas as Katie
