= Horace Waller (soldier) =

Recipient of the Victoria Cross

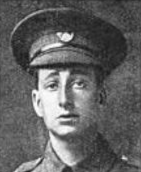
- Born: 23 September 1896; Batley Carr, West Riding of Yorkshire, England
- Died: 10 April 1917 (aged 20); Heninel, France
- Military career
- Allegiance: United Kingdom
- Branch: British Army
- Rank: Private
- Units: The King's Own Yorkshire Light Infantry
- Conflicts: World War I
- Awards: Victoria Cross

Horace Waller VC (23 September 1896 – 10 April 1917) was an English recipient of the Victoria Cross, the highest and most prestigious award for "gallantry in the face of the enemy" awarded to British and Commonwealth forces.

== Biography ==
Waller was born 23 September 1896, in Batley Carr, Dewsbury, Yorkshire, to John Edward and Esther Waller, of Dewsbury, Yorkshire.

Waller was educated at Miss Whitworth’s Seminary, Dewsbury, Purlwell Council School, Batley Carr 1905–1909, Batley Grammar School from 1909–1913, and Dewsbury Technical College from 1913. He was rejected for military service twice before enlisting at the age of 19 on 30 May 1916 and was sent to France in December 1916.

As a 20-year-old private in the 10th Service Battalion, The King's Own Yorkshire Light Infantry, British Army during the First World War, Waller was awarded a Victoria Cross for his valiant actions on 10 April 1917 south of Heninel, France. During the day, Waller continued for more than an hour to throw bombs and held off enemy attack. In the evening the enemy again counter-attacked and eventually killed Waller.

For most conspicuous bravery when with a bombing section forming a block in the enemy line. A very violent counter-attack was made by the enemy on this post, and although five of the garrison were killed, Pte. Waller continued for more than an hour to throw bombs, and finally repulsed the attack. In the evening the enemy again counter-attacked the post and all the garrison became casualties, except Pte. Waller, who, although wounded later, continued to throw bombs for another half an hour until he was killed. Throughout these attacks he showed the utmost valour, and it was due to his determination that the attacks on this important post were repulsed.

— The London Gazette," No. 30122, 8 June 1917.

He is buried at Cojeul British Cemetery, Pas-de-Calais, France.
