= Staincliffe and Batley Carr railway station =

Disused railway station in West Yorkshire, England

Staincliffe and Batley Carr
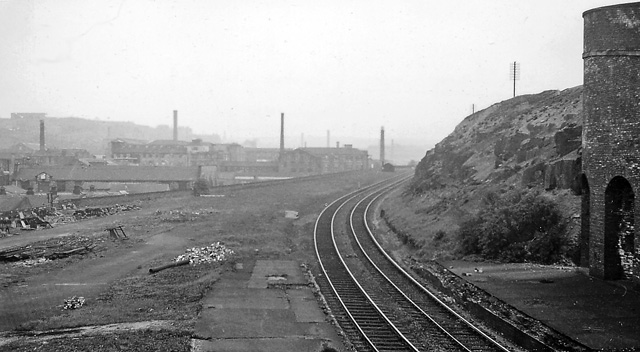
- Site of the station (1961)

General information
- Location: Staincliffe; Batley Carr, West Yorkshire; England
- Coordinates: 53.7022°N 1.6276°W
- Grid reference: SE246229
- Platforms: 2

Other information
- Status: Disused

History
- Original company: London and North Western Railway
- Pre-grouping: London and North Western Railway

Key dates
- 1 November 1878: Opened
- 1 January 1917: Closed as a wartime economy measure
- 5 May 1919: Reopened
- 7 April 1952: Closed
Location

Staincliffe and Batley Carr railway station served the hamlet of Staincliffe and the district of Batley Carr in West Yorkshire, England from 1878 to 1952 on the Huddersfield Line.

== History ==
The station opened on 1 November 1878 by the London and North Western Railway. It closed as a wartime economy measure on 1 January 1917 but reopened on 5 May 1919, only to close again on 7 April 1952.

Preceding station	Historical railways	Following station
Batley	London and North Western Railway; Huddersfield Line	Dewsbury
