= Batley Carr =

District in West Yorkshire, England

Coordinates: 53.703°N 1.635°W

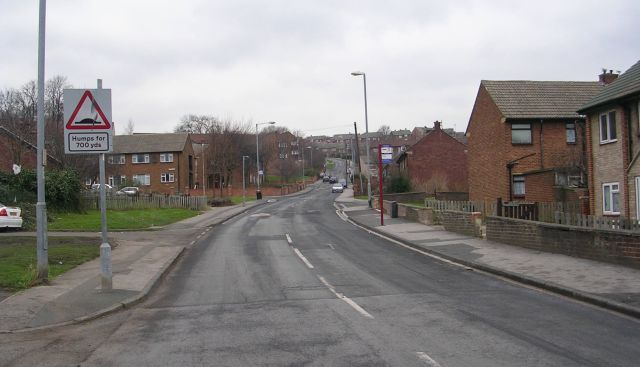
- Hyrstlands Road

- Location within West Yorkshire
- OS grid reference: SE235235
- Metropolitan borough: Kirklees
- Metropolitan county: West Yorkshire
- Region: Yorkshire and the Humber
- Country: England
- Sovereign state: United Kingdom
- Post town: BATLEY
- Postcode district: WF17
- Dialling code: 01924
- Police: West Yorkshire
- Fire: West Yorkshire
- Ambulance: Yorkshire
- UK Parliament: Spen Valley

Batley Carr is a district which includes parts of Dewsbury and Batley in West Yorkshire, England.

Batley Carr housed workers from the mills of Dewsbury and Batley. As the settlement expanded with the growth of the textile industry, it gained its own railway station, Staincliffe and Batley Carr. The red brick station master's house still stands, but is now a private residence.

Shannon Matthews, who disappeared from Dewsbury Moor on 19 February 2008, was found alive on 14 March 2008 in Lidgate Gardens, Batley Carr.

== Notable people ==
- Horace Waller, recipient of the Victoria Cross
- Cardinal Arthur Roche, Prefect of the Dicastery for Divine Worship and the Discipline of the Sacraments and ninth Roman Catholic Bishop of Leeds
