= Cape Wrath (TV series) =

2007 British TV series

- UK Ad Bumper
- Also known as: Meadowlands
- Genre: Thriller
- Created by: Robert Murphy; Matthew Arlidge
- Directed by: Duane Clark; Andrew Gunn; Paul Walker
- Starring: David Morrissey; Lucy Cohu; Ralph Brown; Tristan Gemmill; Melanie Hill; Nina Sosanya; Felicity Jones; Harry Treadaway; Don Gilet; Scot Williams; Ella Smith; Sian Brooke
- Composer: Adrian Johnston
- Country of origin: United Kingdom
- Original language: English
- No. of series: 1
- No. of episodes: 8

Production
- Executive producers: Matthew Arlidge; Douglas Rae; Francis Hopkinson
- Producer: Caroline Levy
- Cinematography: John Daly; Mark Waters
- Editors: Luke Dunkley; Paul Endacott
- Running time: 45 minutes
- Production company: Ecosse Films

Original release
- Network: Channel 4; E4 (First Look); Showtime (US)
- Release: 17 June – 5 August 2007

Cape Wrath (also known as Meadowlands) is a British thriller drama television series, created by Robert Murphy and Matthew Arlidge, that first broadcast in the United Kingdom on 10 July 2007 on Channel 4. Produced by Ecosse Films, the series focuses on the Brogan family, who are trying to escape their past while confronting an even more uncertain future.

The series was a co-production between Channel 4 in the UK and Showtime in the United States, where it received its world première on 17 June 2007, at 22:00 EST. During its original broadcast on Showtime, the series was accompanied by an interactive online experience, which following each episode, featured exclusive content detailing the background of a specific character from their life before they moved to Meadowlands, including their real name.

Due to low ratings, Channel 4 executives confirmed that a second series would not be commissioned. The complete series was released on Region 2 DVD on 27 August 2007. A quiz based upon the series is available to play on FunTrivia.

== Plot ==
The series opens with Danny (David Morrissey) and Evelyn Brogan (Lucy Cohu) and their two teenage children, Zoe (Felicity Jones) and Mark (Harry Treadaway), entering a witness protection programme and moving to a bucolic neighbourhood known as Meadowlands to begin a new life. Picturesque and crime-free, Meadowlands appears to be a suburban paradise where the Brogan family can start a new life. However, they soon realise that it is not so easy to escape the past, and their haven becomes a world of paranoia and psychological intrigue with shocking surprises around every corner, especially the particularly stunning revelation that they can never leave.

== Production ==
The series was filmed in Kent. Many of the interior sets were built in a warehouse close to The Maidstone Studios. The estate itself is in fact The Lakes, a new housing development built next to Leybourne Lakes Country Park. Kings Hill features as the local town centre. Other locations include The Kings Hill Golf Course, Wye College and Maidstone Leisure Centre.

== Cast ==
- David Morrissey as Danny Brogan
- Lucy Cohu as Evelyn Brogan
- Ralph Brown as Bernard Wintersgill
- Tristan Gemmill as David York
- Melanie Hill as Brenda Ogilvie
- Nina Sosanya as Samantha Campbell
- Felicity Jones as Zoe Brogan
- Harry Treadaway as Mark Brogan
- Don Gilet as Freddie Marcuse
- Scot Williams as Tom Tyrell
- Ella Smith as Jezebel Ogilvie
- Sian Brooke as Lori Marcuse
- Emma Davies as Abigail York
- Tom Hardy as Jack Donnelly
- Sean Harris as Gordon Ormond

== Episodes ==
No.	Title	Directed by	Written by	Original release date	UK airdate	UK viewers (millions)
1	"Episode 1"	Robert Murphy	Duane Clark	17 June 2007	10 July 2007 (Note: Episodes 1 & 2 were edited together into a single 77-minute episode when first broadcast on Channel 4.)	1.83
The Brogans arrive at Meadowlands and meet their neighbours: bad boy handyman Jack Donnelly, vivacious and bubbly Brenda and general practitioner Dr. York, all of whom harbour secrets as potentially devastating as the Brogans'.
2	"Episode 2"	Robert Murphy	Duane Clark	24 June 2007	10 July 2007	TBA
A day that begins with hope for the future ends with tragedy when Mark's experimenting with cross-dressing results in a brutal attack that leaves him traumatised again and Danny reeling from his own murderous rage.
3	"Episode 3"	Chris Dunlop	Duane Clark	30 June 2007	10 July 2007 (Note: From Episode 3 onwards, episodes were first broadcast on E4 as part of its "First Look" strand, immediately following the broadcast of the previous episode on Channel 4.)	TBA
Local cop Wintersgill becomes suspicious of Jack Donnelly's absence and begins investigating his disappearance, while Danny and Mark struggle to keep Jack's murder a secret.
4	"Episode 4"	Robert Murphy	Duane Clark	8 July 2007	17 July 2007	TBA
A vicious psychological game of cat and mouse ensues between Danny and Wintersgill, as Mark has a charged encounter with neighbour Brenda and Evelyn learns a shocking truth that affects her past and future.
5	"Episode 5"	Chris Denne & Joel Jenkins	Paul Walker	15 July 2007	24 July 2007	TBA
Danny's handlers frame Ormond for Jack's murder, while Evelyn pleads with Dr. York to lie about Danny's fertility test results and Zoe undertakes an investigation of Jack's death with the help of former journalist Tom Tyrell.
6	"Episode 6"	Robert Murphy	Paul Walker	22 July 2007	31 July 2007	TBA
Danny attempts to decipher the truth about Cape Wrath, while Samantha's visit with her dying father reveals more of the history behind Meadowlands and the romantic triangle between York, Abigail and Evelyn takes a disturbing turn.
7	"Episode 7"	Chris Dunlop	Andrew Gunn	29 July 2007	7 August 2007	TBA
Danny launches a desperate plan to escape from Meadowlands with his family, while York becomes increasingly unhinged and demands sexual favours from Evelyn in exchange for keeping her secret.
8	"Episode 8"	Robert Murphy	Andrew Gunn	5 August 2007	7 August 2007 (Note: Episode 8 was broadcast directly after Episode 7, meaning that it was technically shown on 8 August 2007, as it was broadcast at 00:05.)	TBA
The painful truth about Danny's relationship to his children is finally revealed, as is the shocking location of Meadowlands; his escape plan gets a hand from a most unlikely source.
