= Ella Smith (actress) =

English actress (born 1983)

- Born: Ella Smith; 6 June 1983 (age 43); Islington, London, England
- Occupations: Actor; writer; director; producer
- Years active: 2006–present

Ella Smith (born 6 June 1983) is an English actress.

== Early life ==
While at drama school, Smith was a winner of the Carleton Hobbs Bursary and has since performed in more than fifteen BBC Radio productions. Her family are Welsh.

== Career ==
Smith made her television debut in a 2006 episode of BBC hospital drama Holby City. She subsequently appeared in ITV drama Strictly Confidential, alongside Suranne Jones, in one episode as the character Tanya Melton.

Smith made her stage debut in the 2006 play The Pocket Orchestra at the Trafalgar Studios in London. She returned to the same venue in 2008 to play Helen, the love interest of Neil LaBute's Fat Pig.

In 2007, she was in Channel 4's Cape Wrath, in which she played the regular role of Jezebel Ogilvie, the daughter of Brenda Ogilvie (Melanie Hill). She also starred in ITV's series Sold as Phoebe.

In 2009, she appeared in the film St. Trinian's II: The Legend of Fritton's Gold, and in 2010, the film Womb and BBC TV's series Mistresses as Trudi's receptionist Steph. In 2011 she played various roles in Danny Boyle's production of Nick Dear's Frankenstein at the National Theatre.

In 2015 she played the role of Mia in the Channel 4 series Babylon. After a successful Kickstarter campaign, in 2016 Smith's short film Mdudu Boy premiered, featuring Kenyan footballer Victor Wanyama.

== Filmography ==
=== Film ===
Year	Title	Role	Notes
2009	St Trinian's 2: The Legend of Fritton's Gold	Lucy	
2010	Womb	Molly	
2010	Burke and Hare	Barmaid	
2012	The Wedding Video	Lauren	
2014	The Voices	Alison	
2015	Cinderella	Slipper Lady	
2015	Kill Your Friends	Nikki	
2016	Hot Property	Saskia Armitage-Munro	
2018	Ray & Liz	Liz	

=== Television ===
Year	Title	Role	Notes
2006	Holby City	Vanessa Robinson	
2006	Strictly Confidential	Tanya Melton	
2007	Cape Wrath	Jezebel Ogilvie	Main cast
2007	Sold	Phoebe	Main cast
2010	Mistresses	Steph	
2013	Call the Midwife	Dolly Smart	
2014	Babylon	Mia Conroy	Main cast
2015–2016	Hoff the Record	Harriet Fitzgerald	Main cast
2021-2023	The Nevers	Desirée Blodgett	Recurring cast
2023	The Tower	DC Elaine Lucas	Series two

=== Theatre ===
Year	Title	Role	Notes
2011	Frankenstein (2011 play)	Gretel, The prostitute; Clarice, The maid	
