= Stafford Hospital scandal =

English scandal

Coordinates: 52°48′40″N 2°5′52″W

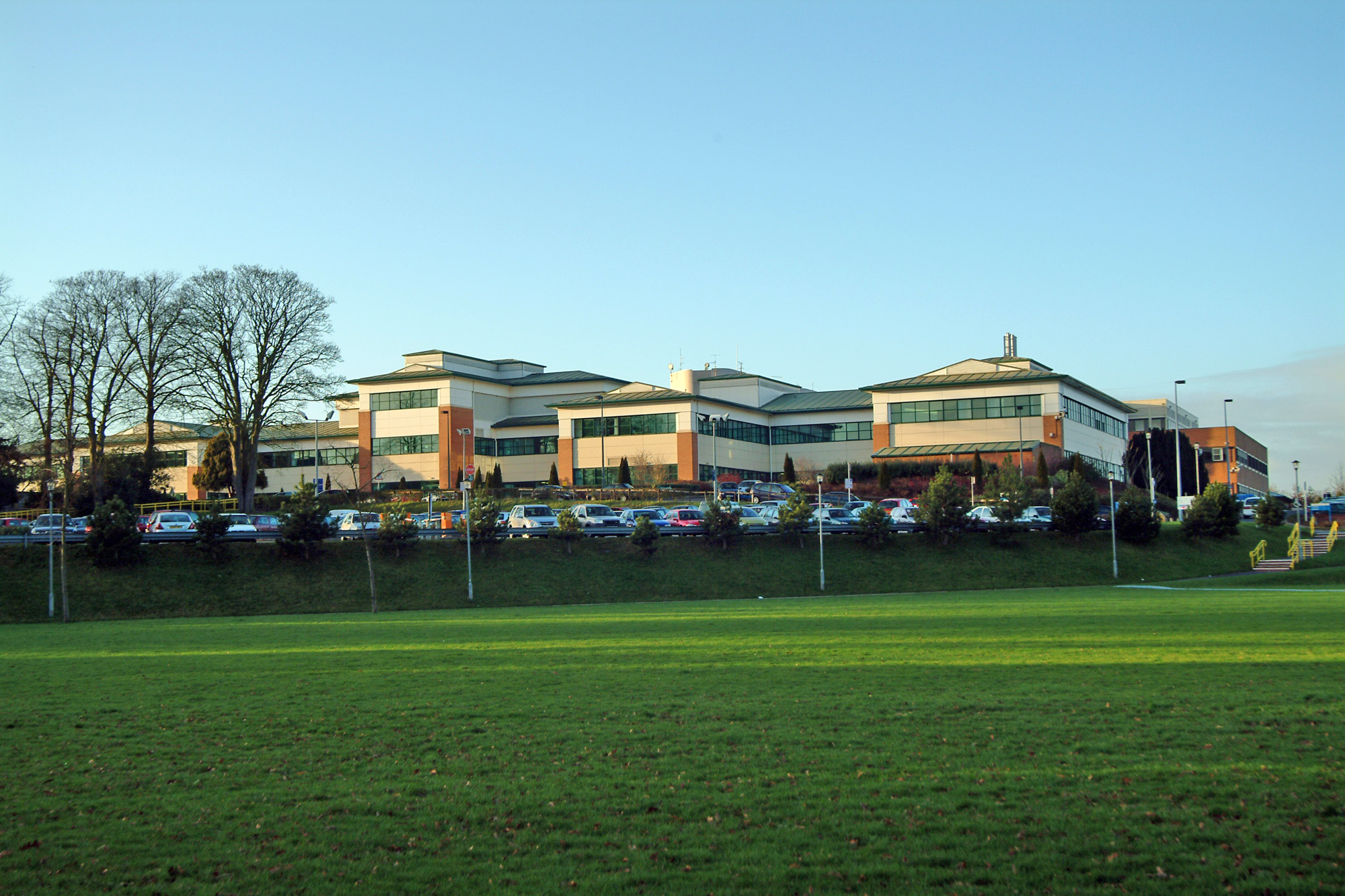
Stafford Hospital now renamed County Hospital

The Stafford Hospital scandal concerns poor care and high mortality rates amongst patients at the Stafford Hospital, Stafford, England, during the early 2000s. The hospital was run by the Mid Staffordshire NHS Foundation Trust and supervised by the NHS West Midlands strategic health authority. It has been renamed County Hospital. The scandal also resulted in the resignation of NHS Chief Sir David Nicholson in 2013.

== History ==
=== Discovery of scandal ===
Julie Bailey, whose mother died in Stafford Hospital in 2007, started a campaign called Cure the NHS to demand changes to the hospital. She was supported by the Staffordshire Newsletter, but the Public and Patient Involvement Forum and the governors of the trust were defensive.

The scandal came to national attention because of an investigation by the Healthcare Commission in 2008 into the operation of Stafford Hospital in Stafford, England. The commission was first alerted by the "apparently high mortality rates in patients admitted as emergencies". When the Mid Staffordshire NHS Foundation Trust, which was responsible for running the hospital, failed to provide what the commission considered an adequate explanation, a full-scale investigation was carried out between March and October 2008. Released in March 2009, the commission's report severely criticised the Foundation Trust's management and detailed the conditions and inadequacies at the hospital. Press reports suggested that because of the substandard care, between 400 and 1,200 more patients died between 2005 and 2008 than would have been expected for the type of hospital, based on figures from a mortality model, but the final Healthcare Commission report concluded that it would be misleading to link the inadequate care to a specific number or range of numbers of deaths.

The Healthcare Commission criticised the foundation trust board, which was led by chief executive Martin Yeates and chair Toni Brisby, for holding in camera board meetings and "for making cutbacks to staffing and services in order to make millions of pounds' worth of surplus at the end of each year," because "bosses focused on the Trust achieving millions of pounds surpluses over a three year period, in order to gain Foundation status", a goal which had been fostered by successive governments setting target dates by which all NHS trusts were supposed to have reached NHS foundation trust status. For example, in 2009, the Department of Health was announcing "A new type of NHS hospital".

The trust's chief executive, Martin Yeates, was suspended with full pay and its chairwoman, Toni Brisby, resigned. On 15 May 2009, Yeates resigned. Prime Minister Gordon Brown and Health Secretary Alan Johnson apologised to those who suffered at the hospital. In response to the scandal, the mortality rates of all National Health Service hospitals have been made accessible on a website.

Cynthia Bower, who was from 2006 chief executive of NHS West Midlands, was recruited to run the Care Quality Commission quango in March 2009, a move which was criticised.

On 21 July 2009, the Secretary of State for Health, Andy Burnham, announced a further independent inquiry into care provided by Mid Staffordshire Foundation Trust. The generally critical inquiry report was published on 24 February 2010. The report made 18 local and national recommendations, including that the regulator, Monitor, de-authorise the foundation trust.

In February 2010, Burnham agreed to a further independent inquiry of the commissioning, supervisory and regulatory bodies for foundation trusts.

As early as October 2010, compensation payments averaging £11,000 were paid to some of the families involved.

=== Public inquiry ===

The revelations of the neglect to patients at Stafford hospital were widely considered to be deeply shocking by all sections of the mainstream UK press; for example, patients were left in their own urine by nurses. In June 2010, the Cameron–Clegg coalition announced that a full public inquiry would be held.

The inquiry began on 8 November 2010, chaired by Robert Francis QC, who had chaired the fourth inquiry which he had criticised for its narrow remit. The inquiry considered more than a million pages of previous evidence as well as hearing from witnesses. Former chief executive Martin Yeates, who "resigned with a pay-off of more than £400,000 and a £1 million pension pot", escaped cross-examination at the inquiry due to self-reported ill-health "with post-traumatic stress disorder, a condition often associated with soldiers returning from war zones" but did participate with a written statement.

Helene Donnelly, a nurse at the hospital, complained that the two Sisters running the department had told staff to lie about waiting times. The Sisters were suspended and Donnelly was harassed. She subsequently gave evidence to the Francis inquiry and was later appointed ambassador for cultural change at Staffordshire and Stoke-on-Trent Partnership NHS Trust.

The final report of the Francis inquiry was published on 6 February 2013, making 290 recommendations.

Academics at the University of Oxford and King's College London have criticised the recommendations of the Francis inquiry to legally enforce a new duty of openness, transparency and candour amongst NHS staff, arguing that increasing 'micro-regulation' may produce serious unintended consequences.

Medical lawyers offered their assistance to distraught and angry families who waited for proof that lessons had been learned. Many families of the victims felt that crucial questions have been left unanswered.

=== Actions against nurses ===
The Nursing and Midwifery Council (NMC), the UK's regulator of nurses and midwives, held hearings about nurses working in the trust following allegations that they were not fit to practise. Acting to protect the public, the NMC has struck off from their register or suspended several nurses as a result of these hearings. This includes two who falsified accident and emergency discharge times, two involved in the death of a diabetic patient and a nurse who physically and verbally abused a dementia patient.

=== Other sequels ===
Yeates was appointed to be Chief Executive of Impact (Alcohol and Addiction Services Shropshire and Telford) in November 2012. It later emerged in November 2013 that a "compromise agreement" had been agreed with him, whereby he had left the NHS with a non-disclosure agreement in place.

In April 2013, the Stafford Hospital was placed into administration by Monitor. This action "was taken after a review team concluded that its services were clinically and financially unsustainable... [and also] concluded that the Trust was unlikely to be able to repay its debts."

In April 2013, Yeates and Brisby were referred to the Crown Prosecution Service by the Stafford Borough Council "over allegations of misconduct in public office by knowingly giving false and misleading evidence relating to death rates to the council's statutory overview and scrutiny committee".

Sir David Nicholson, who was in charge of the NHS which was responsible for the hospital at the height of the failings between 2005 and 2006, resigned in May 2013 in connection with this scandal.

An independent 2008 study into hospital standardised mortality ratios found that the mortality measure developed by the Foster Unit at Imperial College London is prone to methodological bias, and that it was not credible to claim that variation in mortality ratios reflects differences in quality of care. In 2015, The Guardian amended an article from 2013:

...subsequent investigations into the poor care at Stafford hospital, including the two reports by Sir Robert Francis QC, said that this disputed estimate, which appeared only in a draft report from 2009 by the Healthcare commission and was based on mortality statistics, was an unreliable measure of avoidable deaths. The Francis report of February 2013 concluded that it would be unsafe to infer from these statistics that there was any particular number of avoidable or unnecessary deaths at the trust.

According to Jeremy Hunt the enquiry described a systematic failure by both the NHS and the Department of Health to deal with such problems. Protecting the reputation of the NHS had become more important. Concentrating on national targets led to managers deprioritising the safety and well-being of patients.

== Television ==
On 30 January 2019, Channel 4 announced that they had commissioned a drama of the Stafford Hospital scandal from the perspective of Julie Bailey.

== See also ==
- Institutional abuse
- Patient abuse
- Winterbourne View hospital abuse
