= Eileen Sills =

British chief nurse and NHS national guardian

Dame Eileen Sills, DBE FRCN (born June 1962) is the Chief Nurse, Director of Patient Experience and Infection Control and a member of the board at Guy's and St Thomas' NHS Foundation Trust. She was the first Freedom to Speak Up National Guardian.

== Career ==
Before taking up the National Guardian post, she was additionally senior nursing advisor at the Nursing and Midwifery Council and chair of the nurses group for the Shelford Group of leading NHS foundation trusts. She was previously the Clinical Director of London's Strategic Clinical Network for Dementia.

She qualified as a nurse in 1983 at Stepping Hill Hospital. She moved from there to work in A&E at North Middlesex Hospital as a Sister and then became director of nursing at the Royal National Orthopaedic Hospital and then Whipps Cross Hospital. She chaired the London Standing Conference group on Homelessness. She trained medical practitioners to be "dementia friends".

Sills was appointed Chief Nurse at Guy's and St Thomas' NHS Foundation Trust in 2005. She sat on the Prime Minister's independent commission into nursing and midwifery that published the Front Line Care (Report) in 2010.

== Honours ==
She was elevated to Dame Commander of the Order of the British Empire (DBE) in the 2015 New Year Honours having been appointed a CBE in the 2004 New Year Honours. She was awarded Fellowship of the Royal College of Nursing in 2012.

== Controversy ==
In January 2016, she was appointed as the first Freedom to Speak Up National Guardian for the NHS.

Some reactions were hostile as she would be working two days a week while retaining her three roles at the Guy's and St Thomas' NHS Foundation Trust for the other three days. Activist Julie Bailey described her appointment as "disappointing". Roy Lilley described her appointment as "an affront" and "waving two fingers".

On 4 March 2016, she resigned from her National Guardian post as she felt unable to do it justice together with her other responsibilities.

On 20 February 2020, it was announced that Dame Eileen would step down from her chief nurse post towards the end of the summer.

== Links ==
- Profile, checkcompany.co.uk; accessed 16 June 2016.
