= Kidnapping of Shannon Matthews =

2008 crime in West Yorkshire, England

- Date: 19 February – 14 March 2008
- Location: Dewsbury, West Yorkshire, England
- Accused: Michael Donovan; Karen Matthews
- Charges: Abduction, false imprisonment (Donovan); Child neglect, perverting the course of justice (Matthews)
- Trial: 11 November – 4 December 2008
- Verdict: Guilty
- Convictions: Abduction, false imprisonment, perverting the course of justice
- Sentence: 8 years

On 19 February 2008, Shannon Louise Matthews (born 9 September 1998), a nine-year-old girl, was reported missing in Dewsbury, West Yorkshire, England. The search for her became a major missing person police operation which was compared to the disappearance of Madeleine McCann, a 3 year old child, who disappeared the year before while on holiday. Shannon was found alive and well on 14 March 2008 at a Batley Carr house belonging to 39-year-old Michael Donovan. Donovan was the uncle of Craig Meehan, the boyfriend of the kidnapped girl's mother, Karen Matthews.

The kidnapping was planned by Matthews and Donovan to generate money from the publicity. Donovan—also known as Paul Drake—was to eventually "find" Shannon, take her to a police station, and claim the reward money, which would be split between Donovan and Matthews. Donovan was charged with kidnapping and false imprisonment. Matthews was charged with child neglect and perverting the course of justice on 8 April 2008. Their joint trial at Leeds Crown Court commenced on 11 November 2008 and concluded on 4 December with both defendants found guilty. They were both given eight-year prison sentences.

Meehan was convicted of possessing child sexual abuse material which was discovered on his computer during the investigation, but had nothing to do with the kidnapping. On 16 April 2024, Donovan died of cancer in hospital at the age of 54.

== Disappearance ==
=== Investigation ===
Nine-year-old Shannon Matthews was seen at 15:10 GMT on 19 February 2008, outside her school, Westmoor Junior School, Dewsbury Moor, after a visit to the Dewsbury Sports Centre swimming pool for a swimming lesson. The school was about half a mile (800 m) from her home. At 18:48, Karen Matthews rang the police to report her daughter missing after she had not returned home from school. West Yorkshire Police started the search which eventually involved more than 200 officers.

The investigation into her disappearance was led by Detective Superintendent Andy Brennan. West Yorkshire Police questioned 1,500 motorists and searched 3,000 houses. By 5 March, more than 250 officers and 60 detectives, about 10% of the West Yorkshire force's operational strength, were involved in the investigation. It became the largest police investigation in West Yorkshire since the Yorkshire Ripper case 30 years earlier. Of 27 specialist victim recovery dogs in the UK, 16 were involved in the search.

=== Publicity ===
The Sun newspaper offered a reward of £20,000 for information leading to Shannon's safe return. It was increased to £50,000 on 10 March, by which time she had been missing for 20 days. A business in Huddersfield – nine miles (14 km) from Dewsbury – offered £5,000.

West Yorkshire Police created a web page, 'Missing Shannon Matthews Appeal', and on 7 March, released a photograph of Shannon on the website. The police released the recording of the 999 call made by Matthews reporting Shannon's disappearance. An official website, 'Help Us Find Shannon', including the 'Shannon Matthews Appeal', was launched on 11 March. Both websites were removed after Shannon was found.

=== Media reaction ===
A comparison was drawn between publicity given to the disappearance of Madeleine McCann and the much lower level of publicity for Shannon. Roy Greenslade, writing for The Guardian blog, explained, "Overarching everything is social class" but added that Shannon's disappearance in the UK made a difference. The Independent took the same line saying, "Kate and Gerry McCann had a lot: they were a couple of nice middle-class doctors on holiday in an upmarket resort... Karen Matthews is not as elegant, nor as eloquent".

The Times noted that the local community had pulled together but that the hunt appeared less newsworthy than the most minor developments in the search for McCann. The Brisbane Times said that Karen Matthews and Kate McCann represented two sides of the social class coin in Britain. The Daily Telegraph speculated that had Shannon been part of a middle-class family, in which articulate parents were conversant with the mechanics of mobilising a slick public awareness campaign, then more public attention would have been focused on the effort to find her.

On 7 March, Matthews said on GMTV that she was certain that her 22-year-old boyfriend Craig Meehan was not involved in the kidnapping and he "would not hurt anybody". Meehan was defended by Shannon's father, Leon Rose. Matthews and Meehan, in an interview on BBC Radio 4's Today programme on 12 March, were questioned about suggestions by her parents that Meehan had been violent towards Shannon, and on Matthews having seven children by at least five fathers (two of the children were registered as having unknown fathers). Commenting on the interview, The Independent said that the case had developed a cruel overtone and that such questions went far beyond necessity and lifted the lid on an uncomfortable hypocrisy in British society.

=== Discovery ===
West Yorkshire Police found Shannon alive at 12:30 on 14 March 2008, 24 days after she went missing. She was concealed in the base of a divan bed in a flat in Lidgate Gardens, Batley Carr. Michael Donovan, the 39-year-old tenant of the flat, was arrested at the scene.

Shannon was placed under police protection and cared for by the local social services department. The police exercised powers under section 46 of the Children Act 1989 which allows a child to remain subject to police protection for 72 hours. She ceased to be subject to police protection on 17 March. Subsequently, she remained in the care of Kirklees Family Services on a voluntary basis. On 15 March, the police reported that Shannon had begun to recover after her ordeal. Specially trained officers questioned her to establish what had happened. The questioning, which lasted for several weeks, took place in ten-minute sessions at a special children's suite resembling a classroom.

== Pre-trial events ==
Donovan was charged with kidnapping, false imprisonment, and committing acts intended to pervert the course of justice on 17 March 2008. He appeared before Dewsbury Magistrates on 18 March, and was remanded in custody. He appeared at Leeds Crown Court, via a video link from his prison cell, on 26 March. The provisional trial date was fixed for 11 November. He made a suicide attempt on 6 April.

Meehan was arrested on 2 April on suspicion of possessing indecent images of children, after police had examined computers in the home. He was remanded in custody by Dewsbury Magistrates, at a hearing on 3 April charged with 11 offences of possessing indecent images of children. On 18 April, Meehan pleaded not guilty, and elected to be tried by magistrate rather than by jury. On 16 September 2008, he was convicted by Dewsbury Magistrates of 11 counts of possessing child pornography, relating to 49 images of level one, two, three and four found on his computer after it was seized from the house he lived in with Matthews, on Moorside Road. On the same day, he was sentenced to 20 weeks' imprisonment but was released, as he had spent longer on remand than the length of the sentence.

Karen Matthews was arrested on 6 April on suspicion of attempting to pervert the course of justice. She was charged with child neglect and perverting the course of justice on 8 April. At a hearing on 5 September 2008, she was also charged with kidnapping and false imprisonment.

Amanda Hyett, Meehan's sister, was arrested on suspicion of assisting an offender on 4 April 2008. Meehan's mother Alice Meehan, sister of Michael Donovan, was arrested on suspicion of attempting to pervert the course of justice, on 4 April. Hyett and Alice Meehan were released on police bail on 4 April but were rearrested with Meehan's sister Caroline on 10 April and held on suspicion of perverting the course of justice before being released on bail. Hyett and Alice Meehan were later released without charge, although Hyett was jailed the following year in an unrelated conviction for benefit fraud.

On 8 April, the police announced they were investigating approaches to the Madeleine's Fund for money to assist the search for Shannon.

Karen Matthews was remanded to face trial alongside Donovan in November 2008.

== Trial and convictions ==
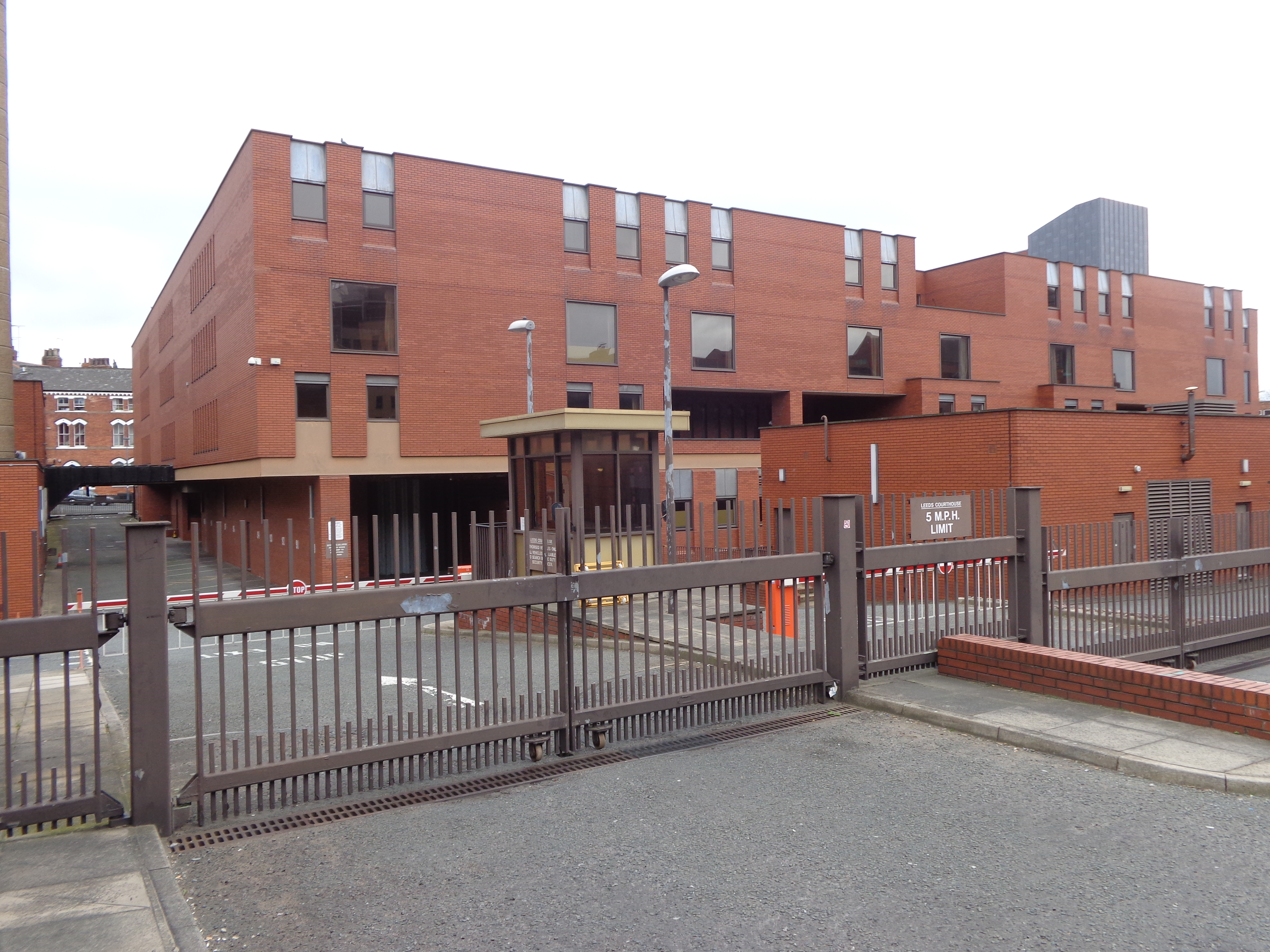
Matthews and Donovan were tried at Leeds Crown Court

In November 2008, the trial heard evidence that Shannon had been drugged to subdue her while held. The Daily Telegraph reported that "The jury was told Shannon was drugged and restrained with a strap tied to a roof beam after her mother hatched a plan to make £50,000 from her faked kidnap."

On 13 November, Detective Constable Mark Cruddace and Detective Superintendent Andy Brennan gave evidence at Leeds Crown Court. A forensic toxicologist told the court that tests on Shannon's hair indicated she had been given temazepam for up to 20 months before her disappearance.

Donovan claimed that Karen Matthews had asked him to look after her daughter for several days and that they would make money from newspaper rewards. He told the court that she had threatened him with violence.

On 27 November, Karen Matthews gave evidence. Sobbing throughout, she denied having anything to do with her daughter's disappearance, claiming that Meehan told her to "take the blame" for what had happened. She said she did so because she was scared of him. In cross-examination, Julian Goose QC said that she had told police a total of five versions of the story and accused her of "telling lie after lie, after lie".

On 4 December 2008, Karen Matthews and Michael Donovan were found guilty of kidnapping, false imprisonment and perverting the course of justice. The plan had been for Donovan to release Shannon at Dewsbury Market, drive around the corner to "discover" her, then take her to a police station and claim the £50,000 reward, which would be split between Donovan and Karen Matthews.

On 23 January 2009, Donovan and Karen Matthews were sentenced to eight years in prison by Mr Justice McCombe.

Karen Matthews was released in April 2012 after serving half her sentence. Donovan had already been released. She reportedly moved to the south of the country and became a born-again Christian.

During the trial, the prosecution revealed that Shannon Matthews regularly had nightmares and needed psychotherapy sessions. Shannon was later given a new identity and placed with a foster family.

== Post-trial media reaction ==
In the aftermath of the trial, revelations about the life that Shannon Matthews and her siblings had endured with their mother were widely highlighted and politicised by the media. The "welfare state" was heavily scrutinised. The Daily Telegraph claimed they were a "dysfunctional family where children equalled benefits".

Writer and political activist Owen Jones later proposed in his 2011 book Chavs: The Demonization of the Working Class that for both the Conservative Party and those parts of the media traditionally supportive of its agenda, "Karen Matthews had become a convenient political prop"; that the case was cynically used to garner public support for the party's subsequent programme of austerity and cut-backs to spending on welfare.

== Serious case review ==
On 16 June 2010, a Kirklees Safeguarding Children Board report found that social services could not have anticipated the abduction. It stated: "The Serious Case Review concluded that the historical and current knowledge available to professionals involved with this family could not have led them to anticipate the third child's abduction from her home or her mother's involvement in this. The only way to have avoided her abduction was through her prior removal from home under a Care Order and there is no evidence to suggest that this was warranted on the basis of professional knowledge about this case."

== In the media ==
A film of the search for Shannon, and her homecoming, was shown in an episode of the Channel 4 documentary series Cutting Edge on 20 March 2008.

A BBC One Panorama special: Shannon: The Mother of All Lies was broadcast on the night of the trial verdict, (4 December 2008), about the disappearance and investigation, featuring the testimony of friends of the family and the police. The special was watched by 5.6 million viewers.

On 18 May 2009, an ITV programme, Tears, Lies and Videotape, documented cases of people who manipulated the media for personal attention. The Shannon Matthews case was the main focus of the show.

In 2010, dark comedy act Kunt and the Gang wrote a musical based on the case and released it on CD that same year. Tuppence Ha'penny Productions subsequently worked with Kunt to produce a live version which premiered in August 2022 at the Edinburgh Fringe Festival as Shannon Matthews: The Musical. This was adapted into a film which was released in October 2024 to considerable media attention.

The Moorside, a two-part dramatisation of the case, aired on 7 and 14 February 2017 on BBC One. The drama focuses on the publicity campaign preceding Shannon's discovery and her mother's involvement in the scheme. Episode one was watched by 9.93 million viewers and the second by 10.23 million viewers.

On 28 February 2017, Channel 5 broadcast a documentary entitled Shannon Matthews: What Happened Next that followed the key people in the investigation nine years later.

On 11 February 2021, Channel 5 broadcast a documentary mini-series entitled The Disappearance of Shannon Matthews, including an interview with Shannon's best friend.

On 8 December 2022, Channel 5 aired the documentary The Man Who Took Shannon Matthews, which focused on Michael Donovan and included a look at his background prior to and his whereabouts following the kidnapping.

Amazon launched its own documentary, The Hunt for Shannon Matthews, in September 2025.

== See also ==
- List of kidnappings (2000–2009)
- List of solved missing person cases (2000s)
