= Julie Bailey =

British activist

CBE Julie Bailey
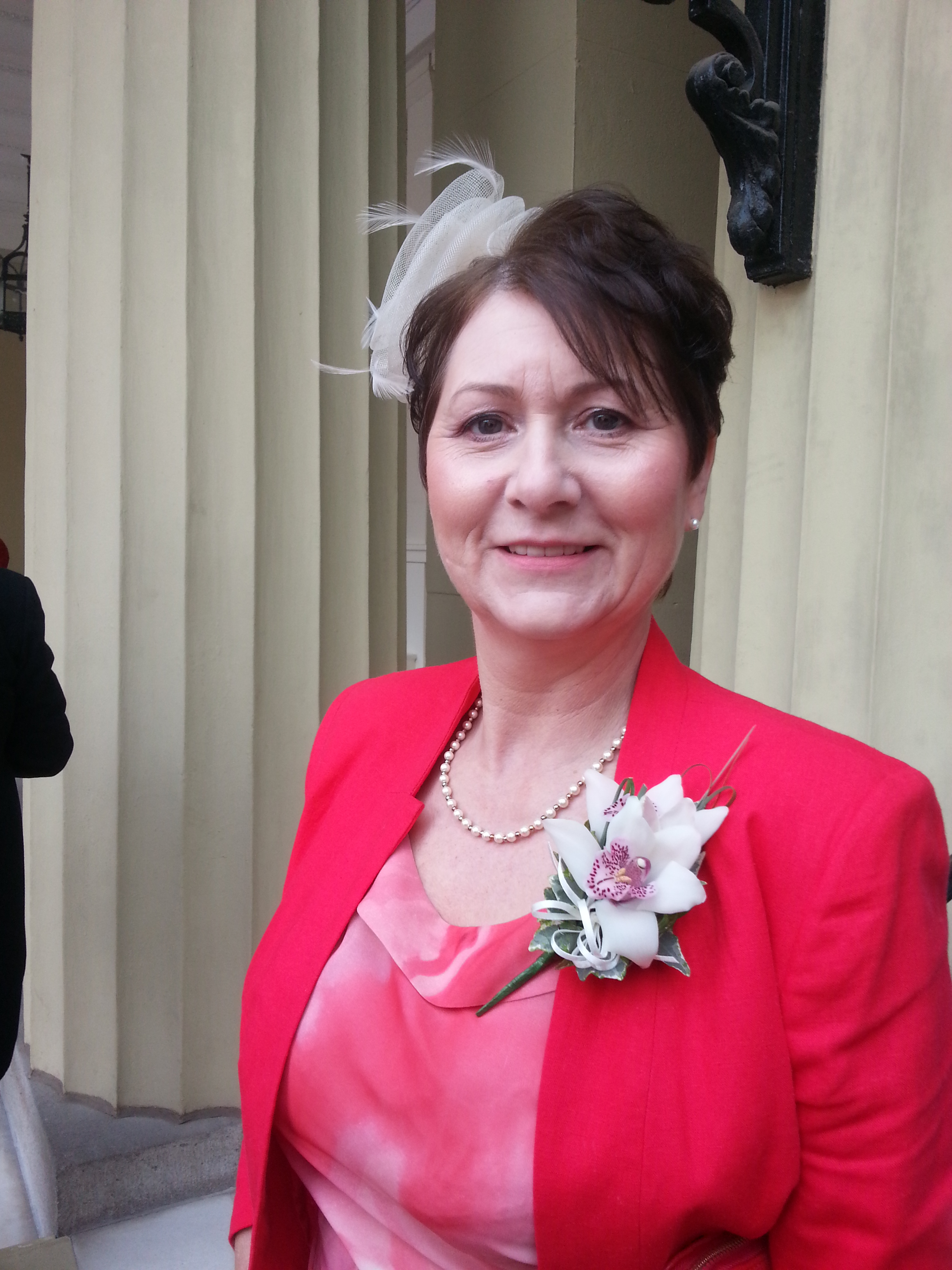
- Bailey in 2014
- Born: Stafford, Staffordshire, England
- Known for: Activism

Julie Dawn Bailey CBE is a British café owner who was a central figure in the Stafford Hospital scandal.

== Biography ==
Born in Stafford, England, Bailey moved to Wales in 1983 before moving back home to care for her mother, Bella Bailey.

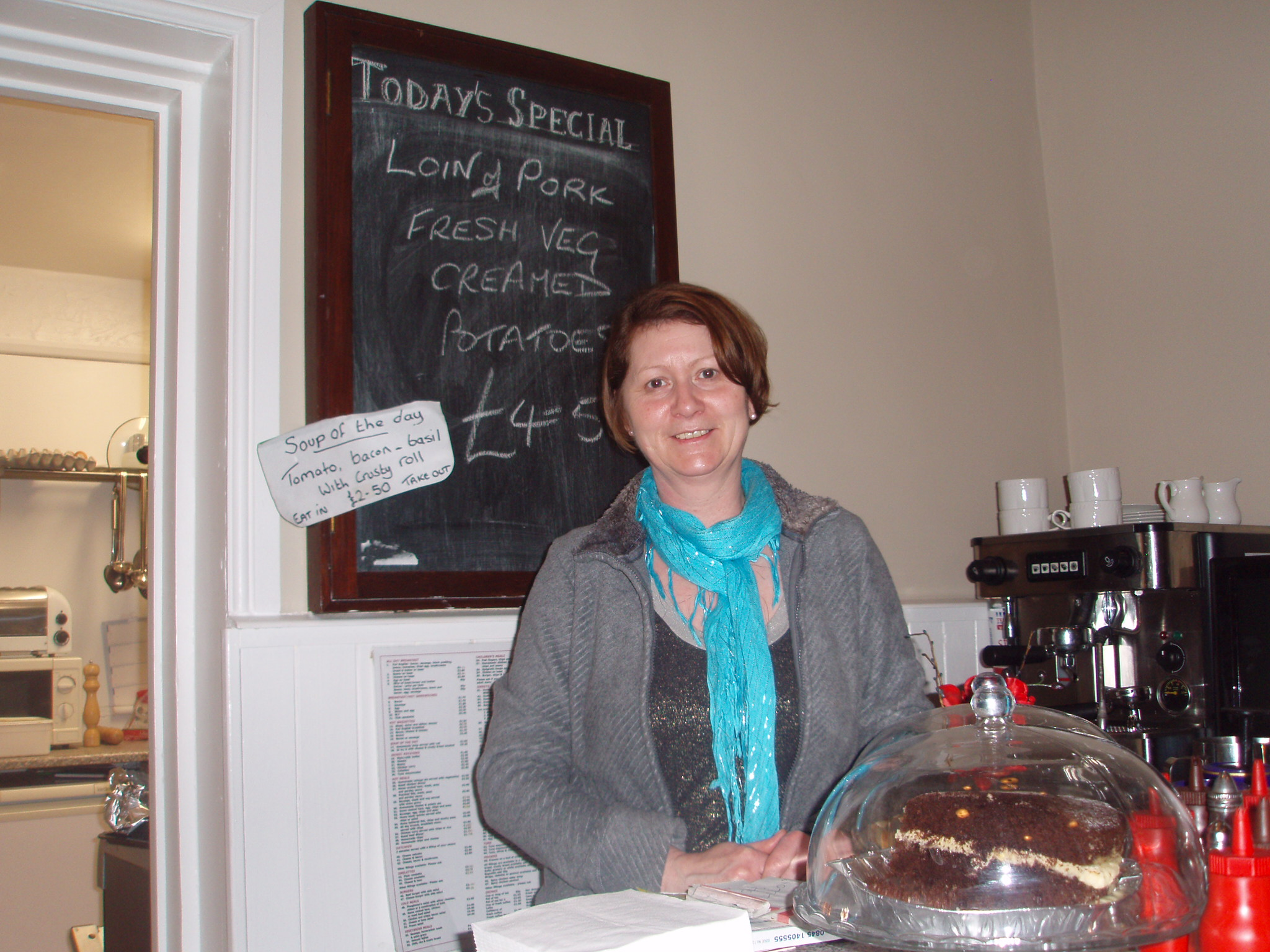
Bailey at her former cafe in Stafford, March 2010

Bailey helped to form an organisation, Cure the NHS, which successfully campaigned for a public inquiry into the failings at the hospital.

She ran a dog grooming parlour and a small cafe, Breaks, on Lichfield Road in the centre of town, which became the headquarters of the campaign. She and her supporters plastered the walls with photographs of dozens of elderly men and women – husbands and wives, fathers and mothers, brothers and sisters – who they claimed had died unnecessarily at the hospital because of lack of care.

She was nationally praised for her determination to shine a light on the failings of the Trust. In Stafford, some people have blamed her for a planned downgrade of the town's hospital. She says she suffered abuse in the streets. However police dropped the investigation into the alleged harassment claim as they could not find sufficient evidence.

== Recognition ==
Bailey was appointed Commander of the Order of the British Empire (CBE) in the 2014 New Year Honours. She received abuse during and subsequent to her campaign, particularly through the Support Stafford Hospital Facebook page.

On 9 April 2014, Bailey was named as the second most powerful woman in Britain by The Independent newspaper and in the BBC Woman's Hour power list 2014.

On 30 January 2019, Channel 4 announced that they had commissioned a drama of the Stafford Hospital scandal from the perspective of Bailey.

Jeremy Hunt credits her for bringing to attention the cultural defects which meant that health provision became cruel and heartless.
