= Robert Francis (barrister) =

British barrister

Sir Robert Anthony Francis KC (born 4 April 1950) is a British barrister. He specialises in medical law, including medical and mental health treatment and capacity issues, clinical negligence and professional discipline. He has appeared as a barrister for and chaired several high-profile inquiries into medical controversies/scandals.

On 21 May 2024, the UK Government announced that Francis had been appointed as the Interim Chair of the Infected Blood Compensation Authority (IBCA).

== Education ==
Robert Francis was educated at Uppingham School, a boys' independent boarding and day school in the market town of Uppingham in Rutland, followed by the University of Exeter, where he qualified as Bachelor of Laws (LL.B) (Hons).

== Career ==
Francis has been a barrister since 1973 and became a Queen's Counsel in 1992. He is a Recorder (part-time Crown Court judge) and authorised to sit as a deputy High Court Judge. He is a governing Bencher of the Honourable Society of the Inner Temple, where he has chaired its Education and Training Committee.

== Notable inquiry work as barrister ==
He appeared as a barrister in inquiries for various NHS scandals:

- investigation on behalf of the GMC over the activities of the disgraced gynaecologist Richard Neale. He was struck off in 2000 after botching operations on women for more than a decade.
- the Alder Hey organs scandal at Alder Hey Children's Hospital in Liverpool, report published on 30 January 2001
- the Bristol heart scandal at Bristol Royal Infirmary, report published on 18 July 2001

== Notable inquiry work as chairman ==
He chaired various independent inquiries:

- the care of Michael Stone who murdered Lin and Megan Russell, report published in 2006
- on behalf of NHS London, the care and treatment of Peter Bryan and Richard Loudwell at Broadmoor Hospital, report published in September 2009
- the first Stafford hospital inquiry report published on 24 February 2010
- the full public Stafford Hospital scandal inquiry The inquiry began on 8 November 2010 and published on 6 February 2013.

== More recent events ==
On 27 November 2013, it was announced that he had become the president of the Patients Association.

On 4 June 2014, it was announced that he had become a non-executive board member of the Care Quality Commission.

On 14 June 2014, it was announced that he had been knighted in the 2014 Birthday Honours.

On 24 June 2014, it was announced that he would be chairing an NHS whistleblowing review, the Freedom to Speak Up Review. The report was published on 11 February 2015.

On 19 September 2018, it was announced that he would be the new Chair of Healthwatch England.

On 14 June 2021, it was announced that he would lead a compensation framework study for those impacted by Contaminated Blood.

== Publications by Francis ==
- Medical Treatment: Decisions and the Law (co-author, 2001, 2nd edition 2010)

== See also ==
- Serjeant's Inn
