= Ravensthorpe railway station =

Railway station in West Yorkshire, England

Ravensthorpe
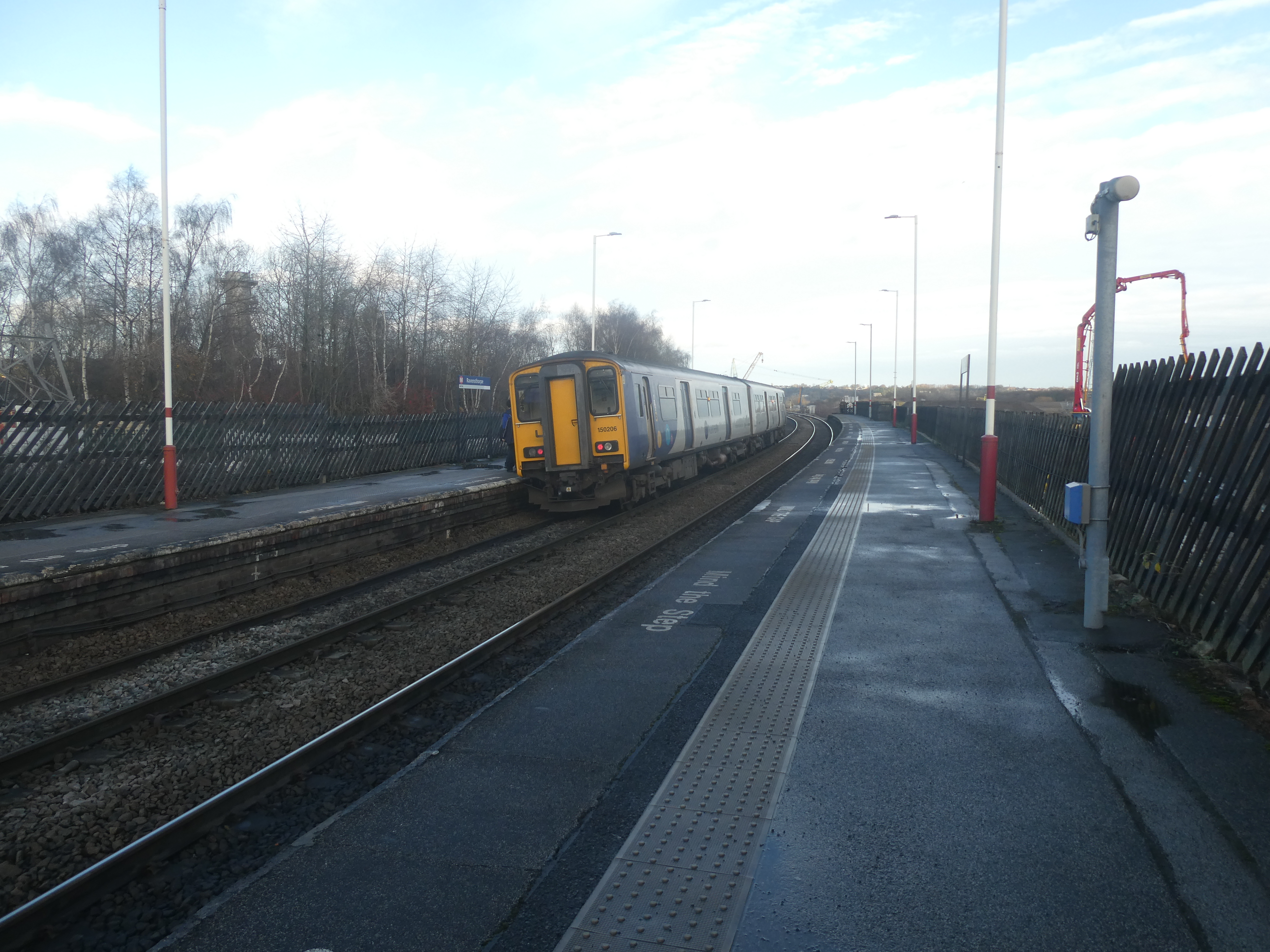
- Ravensthorpe station, looking towards Dewsbury and Leeds

General information
- Location: Ravensthorpe, Kirklees; England
- Coordinates: 53.675660°N 1.655550°W
- Grid reference: SE228199
- Manager: Northern
- Transit authority: West Yorkshire Metro
- Platforms: 2

Other information
- Station code: RVN
- Fare zone: 3
- Classification: DfT category F2

History
- Opened: 1890
- Closed: 13 December 2025

Passengers
- 2021/22: ▲31,784
- 2022/23: ▲38,324
- 2023/24: ▼35,926
- 2024/25: ▼31,442
- 2025/26: ▼21,774
Location
Notes
- Passenger statistics from the Office of Rail and Road

Ravensthorpe railway station served the Ravensthorpe suburb of Dewsbury in West Yorkshire, England. It was situated on the Huddersfield line between Leeds and Manchester, 8 miles (13 km) north-east of Huddersfield.

The station was managed by Northern Trains, although almost all services, except a handful of peak-time Leeds to Wigan Trains, were provided by TransPennine Express.

Ravensthorpe station was situated just north-east of Thornhill LNW (London North Western) Junction, where a line branches to Wakefield Kirkgate. The station will be rebuilt to the west of the junction, on the route built by the former Manchester and Leeds Railway.

== History ==
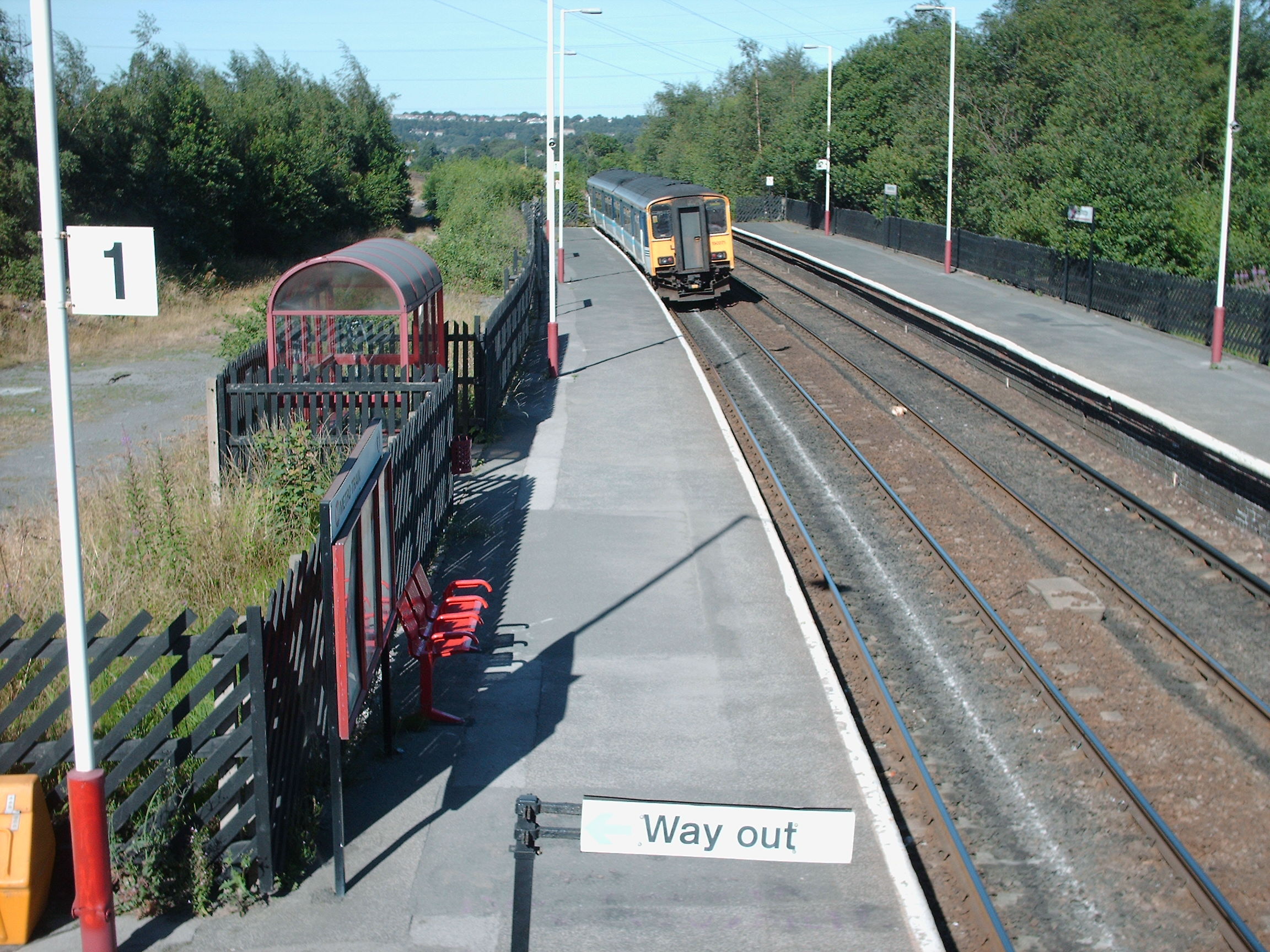
Ravensthorpe station with a regional railways class 150 departing

Ravensthorpe was a late addition to the London and North Western Railway, with the station and goods shed built in 1890 to attract freight traffic in the area. The line itself had opened some 42 years earlier. Originally, the station was called "Ravensthorpe and Thornhill" as L&Y had opened a station, Ravensthorpe, on their railway branch between Thornhill and Heckmondwike.

== Upgrade ==
As part of a wider upgrade to the route between Huddersfield and Dewsbury, Network Rail proposes to partially grade separate the junction between the two lines and increase capacity for express trains by 4-tracking the route to the west. The new junction design would move the alignment of the Leeds route slightly to the south, meaning the existing station would have to be largely demolished and rebuilt. Network Rail therefore plans to abandon the current station site, and build a replacement approximately 330 yards (300 m) to the west, which would turn Ravensthorpe into a junction station, allowing trains to and from Wakefield to call in addition to the existing Leeds services. A TWAO -Transport Work Act Order was submitted for the 4-tracking in April 2021. The Integrated Rail Plan for the North and Midlands (IRP) announced November 2021, calls for full electrification of the line and thus the station.

The station closed on 13 December 2025, and is expected to reopen 200 metres to the west in Summer 2028.

== Facilities ==
Ravensthorpe station was unstaffed. The former station buildings, having been damaged by fire, were demolished and replaced with basic shelters. There were no facilities to purchase tickets and so passengers must purchase tickets on the train.

There were timetable posters and a telephone available to obtain train running information, along with a digital information screen on the eastbound (towards Leeds) platform, but not on the westbound platform (towards Huddersfield / Manchester. Step-free access was limited to the eastbound platform, as the westbound platform could only be reached by steps.

Ravensthorpe was one of West Yorkshire's least used stations due to its relatively remote location, although it did also serve the nearby village of Thornhill.

== Services ==
Ravensthorpe was served each day (including Sundays) by an hourly combined TransPennine Express / Northern Trains service running between Leeds and Huddersfield. This replaced the former local Transpennine-run Manchester to Leeds stopping service at the December 2024 timetable change. There were also a limited number of peak time calls (Monday to Saturday) on the hourly Wigan and Manchester Victoria to Leeds via Brighouse service.

The former Manchester Piccadilly to Leeds stopper no longer calls, as after Mirfield that service now goes to York via Wakefield Kirkgate and Castleford.

Preceding station	National Rail	Following station
Mirfield	TransPennine Express; North TransPennine (Manchester–Leeds)	Dewsbury
Mirfield	Northern Trains; Wigan Wallgate–Leeds	Dewsbury

== See also ==
- Huddersfield line
- Transpennine north railway upgrade
