= Heckmondwike Spen railway station =

Disused railway station in West Yorkshire, England

Heckmondwike Spen
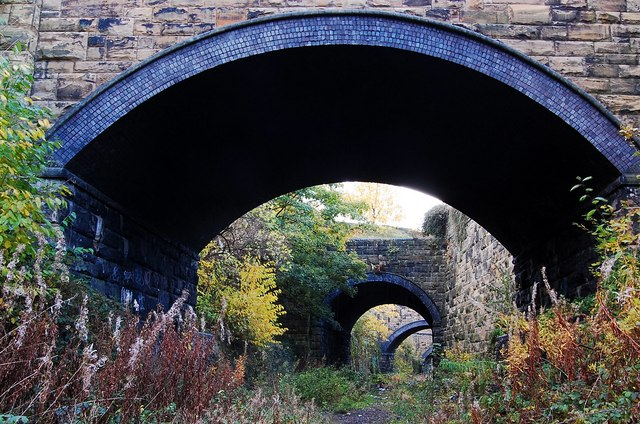
- Heckmondwicke cutting; a view of the Leeds new line before the cycleway was installed

General information
- Location: England
- Coordinates: 53.7080°N 1.6721°W
- Platforms: 2

Other information
- Status: Disused

History
- Pre-grouping: London North Western Railway
- Post-grouping: London Midland & Scottish Railway

Key dates
- 1 October 1900: Station opened as Heckmondwike
- 2 June 1924: Renamed Heckmondwike Spen
- 5 October 1953: Station closed
Location

Heckmondwike Spen was a railway station opened by the London & North Western Railway (LNWR) in Heckmondwike, West Yorkshire, England. The station was one of two in the town, the other being Heckmondwike railway station which was opened by the Lancashire & Yorkshire Railway (L&Y) (though at the time of the LNWR station being opened, local people referred to the L&Y station as Heckmondwike Old). Both stations have been closed and the lines they served have closed too, although the formations that they occupied have both been converted into greenways.

== History ==
Heckmondwike Spen was located on the Leeds New Line, which ran from Farnley & Wortley to Bradley. The station opened to traffic in October 1900, after the London and North Western Railway (LNWR) built the line as an alternative route to their existing line from Mirfield to Leeds through Morley Tunnel. This had become very busy and, due to geological issues arising from previous mining activity, a new tunnel and four-tracking the existing line was not possible; the Leeds New Line was then opened to reduce the pressure on that line.

The line passed under nine bridges on its way through the town. The station was set in a cutting and had two through platforms and a bay facing towards the Leeds direction. The bay platform was closed in 1920 at the time that the station signalbox was removed. The station was opened as Heckmondwike, but was renamed to 'Heckmondwike Spen' in 1924 to avoid confusion with Heckmondwike Central station on the Lancashire & Yorkshire line between Low Moor and Mirfield.

Most buildings on the line were constructed of wood which led to some losses to lineside fires caused by passing steam trains. In 1915, the goods warehouse at Heckmondwike burnt to the ground and was not replaced (whereas Northorpe station, which burnt to the ground in 1921, was replaced by Northorpe Higher in the same year).

At the grouping of 1923, the line, along with most other LNWR lines, became part of the London Midland & Scottish Railway. The LMS appended the name Spen to the station (and to the Cleckheaton and Liversedge stations on the same line) to avoid confusion with the station named Heckmondwike on the parallel Low Moor to Mirfield line (the Spen Valley Line).

The intermediate stations closed to passengers in October 1953, but the route stayed open for long-distance non-stopping passenger trains and freight until 1960. Thereafter, a small section through Heckmondwike stayed open to serve an oil terminal in Liversedge. This was made possible by a spur built by British Rail in 1966, connecting the line just south of Heckmondwike with the Heckmondwike Central to Thornhill line; this allowed all other sections of the former Leeds New Line to be closed by July 1965.

Preceding station	Disused railways	Following station
Liversedge Spen; Line and station closed	LNWR; Leeds New Line	Northorpe Higher; Line and station closed

== The site today ==
A 1.6-mile (2.5 km) section of track heading north-westwards from Heckmondwike station towards Cleckheaton has been converted into the Spen Valley Ringway, a small side path to the Spen Valley Greenway, which runs from Low Moor to Thornhill on the former Lancashire & Yorkshire Railway between the two stations. Both paths are part of the National Cycle Route 66.

The impetus for opening the path was that Yorkshire Water were installing a £90 million sewer beneath the Greenway path through Heckmondwike, so foot and cycle traffic was diverted onto the Ringway path until this construction was completed. The Ringway path is tarmacked and was opened in 2003. Heckmondwike Spen station was demolished in 2006 and its site is now a housing estate.
