= Low Moor Explosion =

1916 industrial disaster in Bradford, England

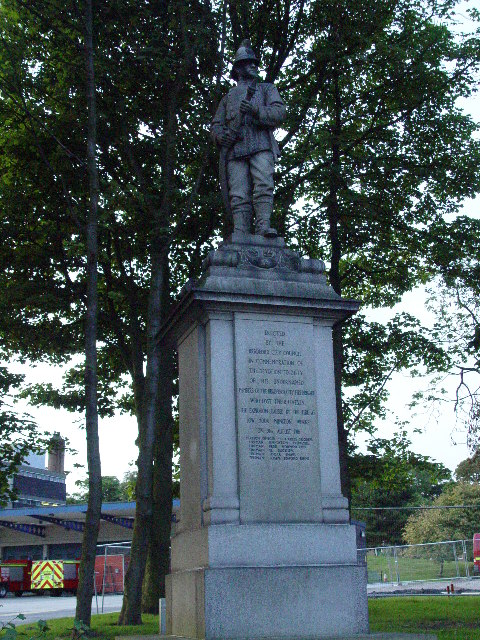
- The firefighters memorial at Birkenshaw
- Date: 21–24 August 1916
- Location: Low Moor, Bradford, West Riding of Yorkshire; 53°44′49.8″N 1°45′14.9″W
- Also known as: The Low Moor Disaster; The Low Moor Munitions Company Explosion
- Type: Explosion; Fire
- Cause: Incorrect storage of Picric acid
- Deaths: 40
- Injuries: 100 (estimated) (Note: Many more were injured in the surrounding area, but records are incomplete and a blanket ban on reporting was also imposed because of the war effort)
- Inquest: 16 September 1916
- Coroner: Mr J G Hutchinson

The Low Moor Explosion was a fire and a series of explosions at a munitions factory in Low Moor, Bradford, West Riding of Yorkshire in August 1916. The factory was manufacturing picric acid to be used as an explosive for the First World War effort and was well alight when the Bradford Fire Brigade arrived. A massive explosion and a series of smaller ones killed 40 people including on-site workers, a railwayman and six firemen who had attended the fire from the Odsal and Nelson Street fire stations.

The investigation after the event initially focussed suspicion on some Belgian workers at the plant, who were accused of having German sympathies. This was refuted completely with the cause being determined as poor storage of materials on site allowing for combustion. The disaster was not widely reported at the time due to reporting restrictions. Similar blanket bans on reporting these incidents affected other factories that suffered disasters such as the Ellisons plant in Heckmondwike in 1914 (Note: Known as the White Lee Disaster, it killed ten workers and injured six more.) and the Barnbow plant in Leeds later in 1916.

A monument to the dead firefighters was unveiled at Scholemoor Cemetery in Bradford in 1924, but the workers from the plant did not have a dedication to them until the 100th anniversary in 2016, when a plaque was unveiled near to the former plant on the Spen Valley Greenway.

== History ==
The factory was originally a plant that made chemicals for dyeing under the name Low Moor Chemical Company (LMCC). When the company was started in the latter half of the 19th century, Bradford was a world leader in textile production and the LMCC produced dyestuffs for companies around the Bradford area. The company had applied to produce picric acid in 1898, some 16 years before the outbreak of the First World War. Its strong yellow colour was perfect for dyeing carpets. A variant of picric acid had been tested by the British Army at Lydd in 1888 and was known as Lyddite.

During the First World War, many factories like Low Moor were converted to producing shells, explosive or components for the war effort, especially during the Shell Crisis of 1915. As Low Moor Chemical Company was already producing picric acid, it was taken over by the Ministry of Munitions and renamed as Factory No, 182, Yorkshire. Before the First World War, the LMCC was producing an average of 35 tonnes (39 tons) of acid per week; by the time of the explosion two years later, the plant was producing nearly 200 tonnes (220 tons) per week and was listed as being an important supplier of picric acid for the war effort. The plant was connected by rail to the local network of lines between Bradford and Halifax and was in close proximity of another dye works, the Low Moor Ironworks and the Bradford Corporations' Gasworks.

The production plant and the magazine storage for the picric acid had been increased exponentially due to the war effort. As up until the outbreak of the war, the production at the plant was safe and so licences to increase production were granted without investigation. Six months before the explosion at the works, numerous small fires broke out in the magazines, which were ignored, presumably because production was of paramount importance. On the day of the explosion, 21 August 1916, the works had a complement of about 250 staff, although there were about 30 absentees, mostly Belgian refugees. At around 2:25 pm, one of the workers was moving open drums from a rail wagon to one of the magazines. There are conflicting accounts from eyewitnesses about what happened next, but a fire started in one of the magazines which resulted in an explosion that threw the worker there onto the ground. A series of smaller explosions rocked the plant, and the fires were initially tackled by the on-site fire brigade, but the fire service from Odsal and at Bradford Nelson Street were mobilised to the site with eighteen City of Bradford firefighters.

At 3:16 pm, a huge explosion rocked the site which killed six of the fire-fighters and destroyed their fire engine, pieces of which were found at Heckmondwike railway station (Note: Heckmondwike had two railway stations; Spen and Central. It is not clear as to which station is intended.) several miles away. Chief Fire Officer Scott was wounded and unconscious, he was pulled away from the fire by his deputy, Superintendent Forbes. Forbes later returned for many of his colleagues and took them to safety, before collapsing himself. The explosion caused flying debris to puncture one of the gas holders nearby which caused a greater explosion as 270,000 cubic metres (9,500,000 cu ft) of gas ignited, the heat of which could be felt over a 1 mile (1.6 km) away. Eyewitnesses describe the gas holder collapsing like a "deflated balloon" and workers from the site fleeing with bleached hair and yellowed skin from being covered in picric acid. The exploding gas created a fireball that could be seen as far away as York, whilst the sound carried for well over 100 miles (160 km). By 6:00 pm, most of the packing sheds were alight or had exploded and significant damage had been caused to the nearby ironworks, dye works, the Lancashire & Yorkshire Railway lines (including rolling stock) and the gasworks had been completely destroyed. All in all, there had been over 20 explosions on the first day and the fires were not fully extinguished until three days later. By the fourth day after the fire, twenty bodies had been recovered.

Over 2,000 homes in the local area had been damaged and all houses within a 2-mile (3.2 km) radius had their windows shattered with 50 of them so badly damaged that they needed to be demolished. The explosions also damaged the local railway network destroying 30 wagons and damaging 100 more. One of the dead was a Lancashire & Yorkshire Railway Fire Brigade fireman, (Note: The L&YR had small numbers of men employed as Firefighters in Locomotive Fire Brigades; this should not be confused with the normal use of the term fireman on the railway.) Henry Richard Tunks, who had been engaged in trying to extinguish property belonging to the Lancashire & Yorkshire Railway that was on fire as a result of the blast. The signaller in the signal box controlling the railway lines to the east, managed to get all his signals to red and escape the signal-box before it was destroyed.

The dead were variously said to have numbered between 34 and 39, but an updated tally states that 40 is the correct number. Some of the six dead firemen had to be identified by the numbers on their axes. 35 of the dead had their bodies recovered from the site, but five others died elsewhere as a result of the injuries they sustained at Low Moor. The plant's manager, John Majerus, (Note: Sometimes spelt as Majerous. He was of French descent and was highly respected by the directors and workers alike.) was engaged early on with helping to fight the fire. Between 5:00 and 6:00 pm, he was found crawling around the wreckage on his hands and knees, but only slightly injured. He died at his home in nearby Wyke that same night. Bodies found at the site were housed in a temporary mortuary set in up the school on New Works Road in Low Moor.

One reason for the inaccurate tally is that of one unidentified worker, so the named dead totalled 39, but the number of bodies was 40. A local group of historians in Low Moor (Low Moor History Group) has tentatively identified the unnamed man as Thomas Woodfine, who was single and from Kent. No-one saw him leave, and his whereabouts after the event were not accounted for, so the group think he is the last unidentified body. Similar disasters befell other plants such as Barnbow, Faversham and Chilwell, which like Low Moor, all had the same low-key press coverage because of the war effort and the effect on morale, with the Ministry of Munitions classifying the event as "war-sensitive". All in all, around 600 people died during accidents in munitions factories during the 1914–1918 period. Some have argued that had the disaster occurred during peacetime, the reporting would have been more in-depth and far-reaching. A report in the Yorkshire Observer two days later (23 August 1916) stated;

“The explosion began with a small fire outside one of the small magazines, which shortly afterwards exploded, and this explosion was followed at short intervals by other explosions until the largest magazine exploded and caused the greater part of the damage. The loss of life was not so serious as at first seemed probable, and this was due to the fact that the fire which preceded the first explosion gave sufficient warning to enable most of the men and all of the women workers to get out of danger.”

In the same issue, the main news report was the death of some 2,588 officers and men killed at the Battle of the Somme.

Estimations of injuries were conservatively placed at 100 people with 60 being serious injuries including the twelve firefighters who survived the 3:16 pm explosion. A bride who had just stepped out of the church after her wedding service was lacerated by flying glass. Other accounts of injuries range to higher numbers because of the damage caused many miles away by the explosions.

== Aftermath ==
Four days after the disaster, questions were raised in Parliament about why the location, number of dead and cause had not been mentioned either in government circles or the press. Dr Christopher Addison, the director of the Ministry of Munitions, replied that they had only located so many bodies and that investigations into the cause were ongoing. The issue was raised in Parliament several times in the latter half of 1916, but the location was never revealed. Many of the subsequent exchanges in the House of Commons were about how people could claim compensation and if the process could be speeded up. It was during these exchanges that Dr Addison revealed that the works were not part of the official Ministry of Munitions, but they belonged to a "Joint Stock Company". (Note: Also, the factory does not appear on any texts relating to Munitions factories during the First World War.)

An investigation, authorised by the Secretary of State to be carried out by Major Cooper-Key, an explosives inspector, was started soon afterwards and labelled "Accident 379/1916". It revealed that the company was storing twice the amount of picric acid than it was licensed for. This investigation was used during the coroners' inquest into the disaster held in Bradford Town Hall in September of the same year. The issue of the missing Belgians and a sabotage plot was investigated carefully, and the Belgians were all asked to account for their absenteeism on the day. All could give satisfactory explanations for their whereabouts on the day and the jury decided that the disaster was an accident, though they did produce a small note indicating that the company should have been storing their goods properly. The fire was most probably started by the ignition of iron picrate which was on the top of the drums. (Note: Picric acid reacts with most metals, but not with tin. The drums were made with iron that was lined with tin. As the drums had no external strops or protective frames (such as wood) the malleable tin was easily worn away exposing the iron underneath which would have reacted with the picric acid to form iron picrate. As iron picrate is sensitive to being struck or hit, this could have been as source of ignition when the drums made contact with the stone setts around the magazines. Another possibility is that the drums caused a spark whilst being rolled across the stone floor.)

"Died from … the result of an explosion of Picric Acid and consequent fire at the Low Moor Munition Works, Low Moor, Bradford aforesaid on the said 21st day of August last such explosion and consequent fire having been caused by the ignition of Picric Acid probably due to the presence of iron picrate on the receptacle containing such Picric Acid which was immediately outside a Magazine at such works where Picric Acid was being manipulated and that there was no negligence of a culpable or criminal character on the part of any person or persons" (The jury's verdict delivered in September 1916).

Correspondence between the clerk of the coroners' court and Cooper-key details how the company was criticised for not using a rubber loading platform and just removing the drums straight from wagons onto the stone floor. The company employees were also not using special overboots to prevent sources of ignition. The drums containing the acid were not covered over in good weather; the covers should have been applied whatever the circumstances to prevent dust and hot clinker being able to come into contact with the product and cause ignition (the nearby buildings were heated by open coal fires).

In 1919, 29 brand new houses were built in First Street in Low Moor to allow some of the displaced families to take up a new home.

Another chemical plant, Allied Colloids, that was situated very close to the site of the Low Moor Chemical Company, suffered a severe fire in 1992.

The site of the works is now a landfill that has since been landscaped, but when it was first dug out, the digging crew found cellars from houses that had been destroyed in the original explosion.

== Awards and memorials ==
The City of Bradford awarded 40 medals out to those who had tried to stop the explosions. Most were handed out to the eighteen firefighters who attended on the day and the commonly became known as the Low Moor Medal.

In March 1917, Superintendent Forbes was awarded the Albert Medal by King George V at a ceremony in Buckingham Palace. Forbes' quick reactions after the explosion saved the lives of many and he also rescued several colleagues including a senior fire officer. He collapsed after driving a fire engine away from the flames. (Note: The write up in The London Gazette states that seven firefighters were killed; this accounts for Tunks, the L&YR fireman.) Forbes' role in the explosion was not fully discovered until the 21st century when historians were looking into the subject. This is possibly because he and his family emigrated to Australia in the 1920s and he stopped attending memorial services.

In March 1924, a memorial was erected near to the graves of the six dead firemen in Scholemoor Cemetery in Bradford. (Note: The memorial's inscription reads: "Erected by the Bradford City Council in commemoration of the devotion to duty of the under named members of Bradford City Fire Brigade who lost their lives in the explosion caused by the fire at Low Moor Munitions Works on the 21st August 1916.") Due to vandalism, this was moved in 2003 to the West Yorkshire Fire and Rescue Service headquarters at Birkenshaw after serving firemen raised £25,000 for its refurbishment and re-location. In 2019, the memorial was listed as a grade II structure.

In 1921 the Bradford Dyers Association purchased Bleasdale House at Silverdale in Lancashire as a convalescent home for employees. This is recorded on the Imperial War Museum's War Memorials Register as WMR 884. At some stage a plaque was erected in the building to commemorate employees of the Association killed in both the World Wars, 'and the 37 men who lost their lives in the disaster at the works of the Low Moor Munitions Company Limited in 1916' - this is recorded as WMR 28984. The following reference is therefore incomplete.

There was no memorial to the other 34 people who were killed in the explosion, but on the 100 year anniversary of the disaster, a metal plaque commemorating all 40 victims was affixed to the firefighters memorial after a short service of thanksgiving. The Low Moor History Group paid for the plaque and researched all the dead as wartime reporting restrictions meant that not all of the dead had been identified. These were listed on the plaque as 28 workers from the plant, the six firefighters, three workers from Sharps Dyeworks, a policeman, a Lancashire & Yorkshire Railway fireman and a member of the public. The plaque is on a boulder that is on the Spen Valley Greenway; a cycle path that runs between Bradford and Dewsbury and passes the site of the chemical works at Low Moor.

== In popular fiction ==
Frances Brody, a former resident of Wibsey in Bradford, penned a novel entitled "Dying in the Wool" which has the 1916 explosion at Low Moor as a backstory.

== See also ==
- List of disasters in Great Britain and Ireland by death toll
- Largest artificial non-nuclear explosions
