= Dewsbury railway station =

Railway station in Kirklees, West Yorkshire, England

Dewsbury
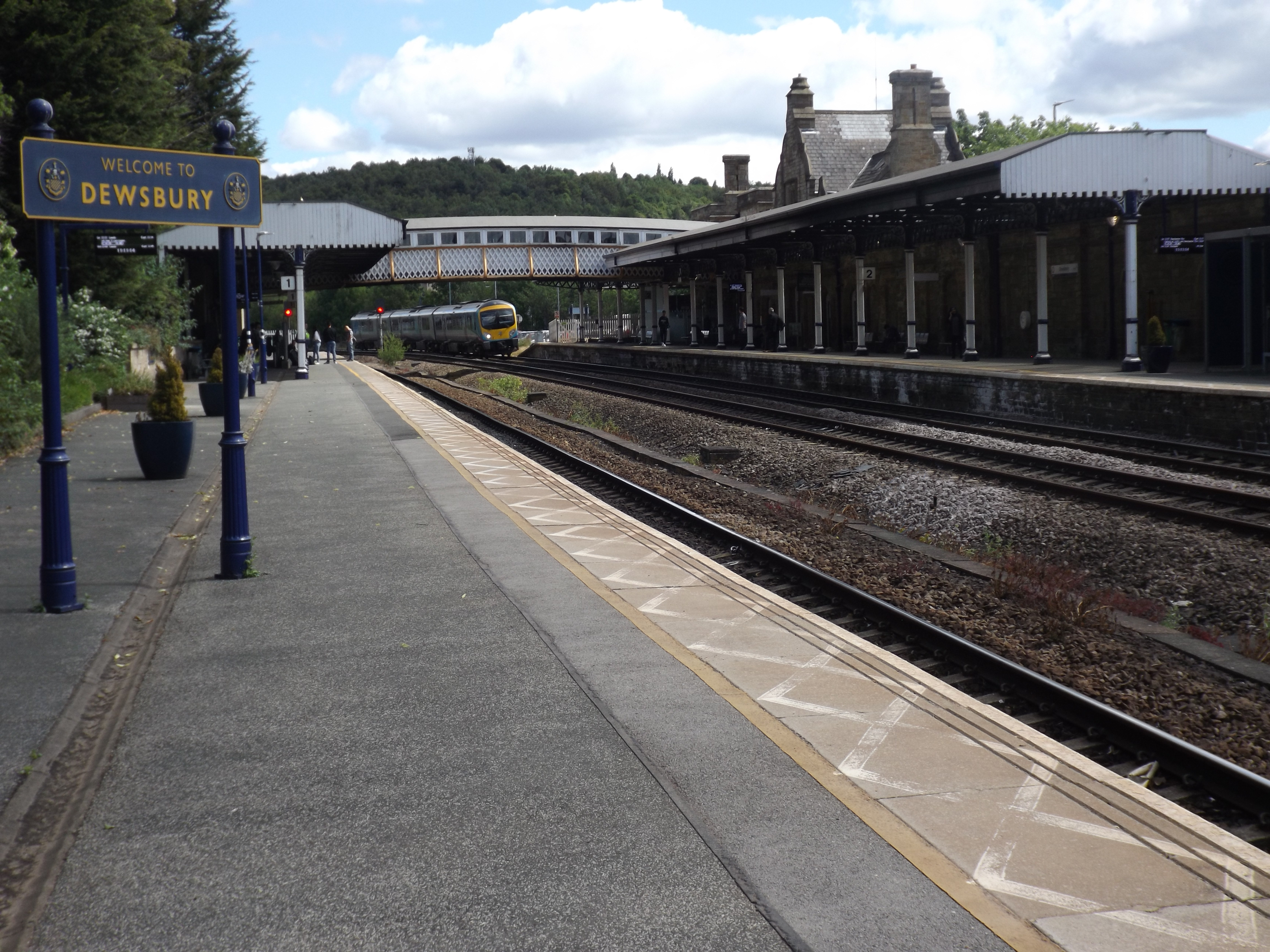
- Dewsbury railway station, in June 2018

General information
- Location: Dewsbury, Kirklees; England
- Coordinates: 53.692°N 1.633°W
- Grid reference: SE243217
- Managed by: TransPennine Express
- Transit authority: West Yorkshire Metro
- Platforms: 2
- Tracks: 3

Other information
- Station code: DEW
- Fare zone: 3
- Classification: DfT category D

History
- Original company: London and North Western Railway
- Pre-grouping: London and North Western Railway
- Post-grouping: London, Midland and Scottish Railway

Key dates
- 18 September 1848: Station opened as Dewsbury
- 2 June 1924: Renamed Dewsbury Wellington Road
- 20 February 1969: Renamed Dewsbury

Passengers
- 2020/21: ▼0.434 million
- 2021/22: ▲1.061 million
- 2022/23: ▼1.032 million
- 2023/24: ▼1.002 million
- 2024/25: ▼0.947 million
Location
Notes
- Passenger statistics from the Office of Rail and Road

Dewsbury railway station serves the town of Dewsbury in West Yorkshire, England. Situated 9.25 miles (15 km) south west of Leeds on the main line to Huddersfield and Manchester, the station was opened by the London and North Western Railway in 1848.

The station is managed by TransPennine Express, who provide trains to Leeds, Huddersfield, Manchester, York, Hull and Redcar Central.

Northern Trains also serve the station with trains on the Calder Valley line.

== History ==
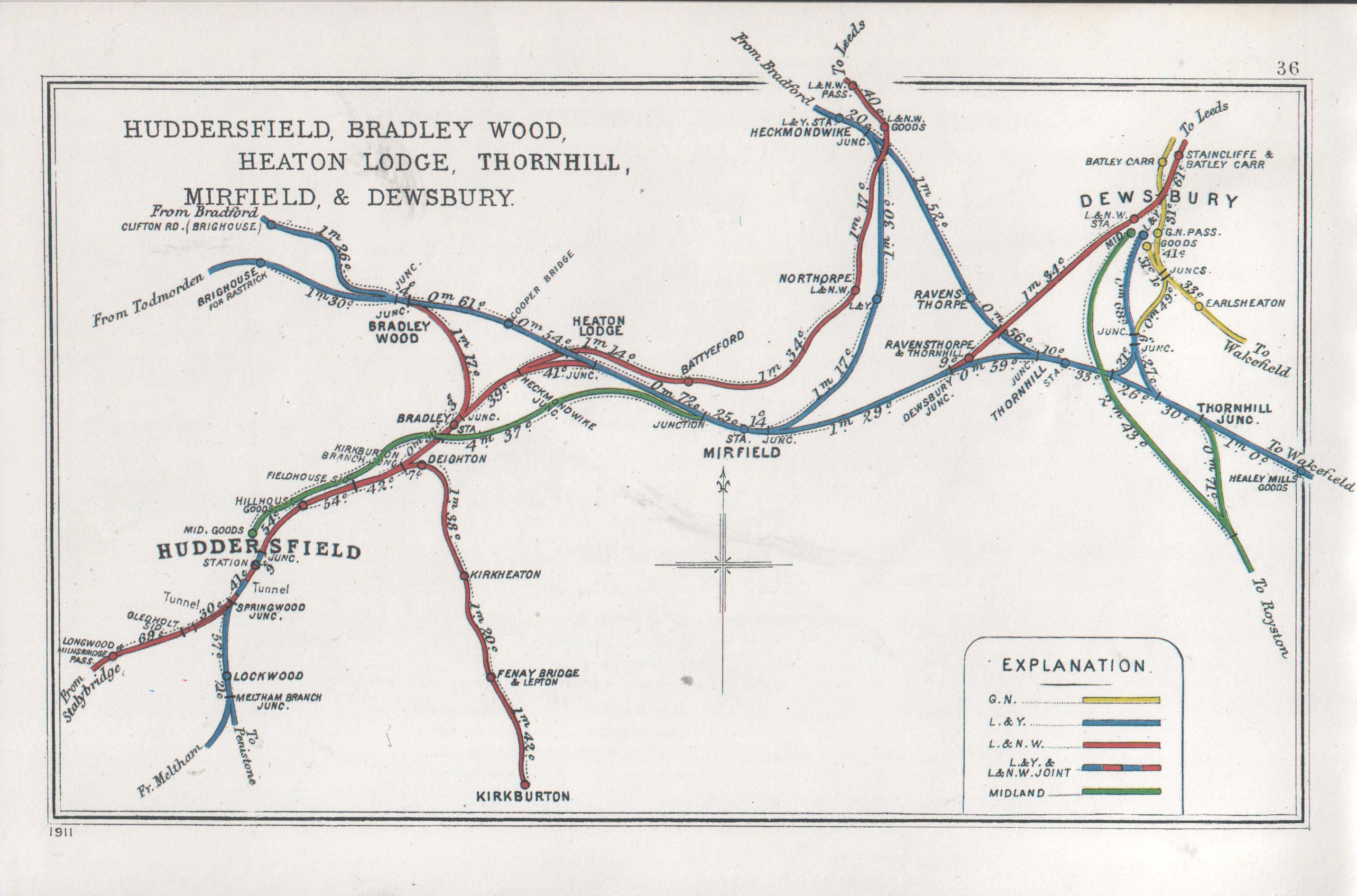
A 1911 Railway Clearing House Junction Diagram showing railways in the vicinity of Dewsbury (upper right). The current station is the one on the red (LNWR) line.

The line between Leeds and Ravensthorpe was built by the Leeds, Dewsbury and Manchester Railway, which was absorbed by the London and North Western Railway prior to opening. Dewsbury railway station was opened on 18 September 1848 and was subsequently named Dewsbury Wellington Road from 2 June 1924 until 20 February 1969, when it reverted to the original name.

Dewsbury was also served by three other stations which have since closed:

- Dewsbury Central, served by the Great Northern Railway on the Bradford Exchange to Wakefield line, closed in 1964.
- Dewsbury Market Place, built by the Manchester and Leeds Railway, closed in 1930.
- Thornhill, also built by the Manchester and Leeds Railway, closed in 1961.

No trace of Market Place station remains, but the façade of Dewsbury Central was incorporated into a bridge supporting the Dewsbury Ring Road in 1985.

== Facilities ==
The station is staffed throughout the day, with the ticket office on Platform 1. Self-service ticket machines are also provided in the booking hall.

There are waiting rooms on each platform, along with digital display screens, customer help points, timetable poster boards and automated announcements to offer train running information. There are accessible toilets and standard toilets available, of which access is granted by station staff or telecommunications. Lifts integrated into the footbridge provide step-free access to both platforms. The footbridge is also a public right of way.

On Platform 1, there is a piece of art called Horizons. The art club from Carlton Junior and Infant School "worked alongside artist Candida Wood from Can Do Art, and over 10 weeks they designed a piece of art aiming to attract members of the local community to visit the station".

Ticket barriers were installed in 2018.

In summer 2018, Kirklees Council started work on making improvements to the outside of the station. Plans included pedestrianising the area directly outside the station and redesigning the car park entrances to improve traffic flow. The improvements are part of the "North Kirklees Growth Zone" initiative, intended to be a kick-start to improvements to the town.

As part of the TransPennine Route Upgrade project, Network Rail plans to upgrade the line west of here towards Mirfield and Huddersfield to four tracks by 2030. This will enable express and local stopping trains to be segregated over this section, increasing line capacity and service frequency.

== Services ==
As of May 2025, the weekday off-peak service pattern is as follows:

TransPennine Express

- 1 tph to Liverpool Lime Street via Huddersfield, Manchester Victoria and Newton-le-Willows
- 1 tph to Manchester Airport via Huddersfield, Manchester Victoria and Manchester Piccadilly
- 1 tp2h to Huddersfield via Ravensthorpe, Mirfield and Deighton
- 1 tph to Newcastle Central via Leeds, York and Durham
- 1 tph to Redcar Central via Leeds, York and Middlesbrough
- 1 tp2h to Leeds via Morley

Northern

- 1 tph to Wigan Wallgate via Hebden Bridge, Manchester Victoria and Walkden
- 1 tph to Huddersfield via Mirfield
- 3 tp2h to Leeds via Morley

On Sundays, the Northern Trains services do not run.

Preceding station	National Rail	Following station
Huddersfield	TransPennine Express; Huddersfield line (Liverpool - Newcastle)	Leeds
Huddersfield	TransPennine Express; Huddersfield line (Liverpool - Hull)	Leeds
Ravensthorpe	TransPennine Express; Huddersfield line (Huddersfield - Leeds)	Batley
Ravensthorpe	Northern Trains; Calder Valley Line (Wigan - Leeds)	Batley

== See also ==
- Listed buildings in Dewsbury
