= Bradford Exchange railway station =

Former railway station in Bradford. Yorkshire, England

Bradford Exchange
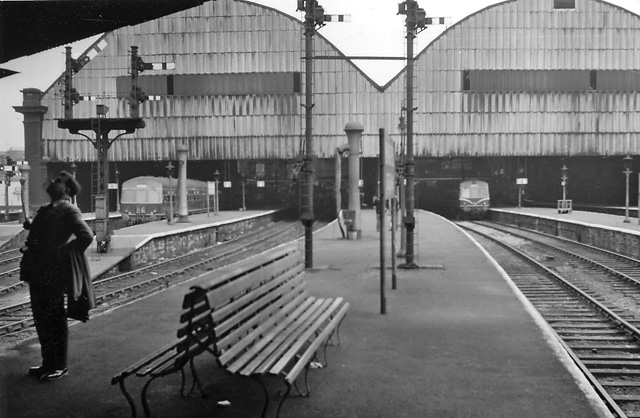
- Bradford Exchange railway station pictured from the centre island platform

General information
- Location: Bradford, West Riding of Yorkshire; England
- Coordinates: 53.792°N 1.749°W
- Grid reference: SE166329
- System: Heavy rail
- Lines: Calder Valley line; Leeds, Bradford & Halifax Junction Railway; Spen Valley Line; Queensbury Lines; Shipley Great Northern Railway branch line
- Platforms: 2 (1850 – 1867); 4 (1867 – 1888); 10 (1888 – 1973)

History
- Opened: 9 May 1850
- Closed: 14 January 1973
- Original company: Lancashire & Yorkshire Railway
Location

Bradford Exchange railway station served the city of Bradford, West Riding of Yorkshire, England, from 1850 to 1973, before being replaced by a smaller, new-build station, which was later called Bradford Interchange. Railway lines from Halifax, Queensbury, Wakefield and Leeds met south of the city centre with services terminating in the station. In the British Rail era, many services did not terminate at Exchange station but became through services which reversed in the station to carry on their journey. Exchange station was originally opened in 1850 by the Lancashire & Yorkshire Railway (L&YR) as Drake Street, becoming Exchange in April 1867 with the arrival of services from the Great Northern Railway (GNR).

It was enlarged in 1888 and closed in 1973, with the station moving to a new 4-platform site a little further south.

== History ==
An Act of Parliament from 1846, authorised the Manchester & Leeds Railway (later the Lancashire & Yorkshire Railway) to build a line from Sowerby Bridge to Bradford (and Leeds). Trains ran initially as far as the Low Moor or Bowling stations until the final section downhill from Bowling Junction could be completed. Bradford Drake Street railway station (later called Exchange) was opened by the Lancashire & Yorkshire Railway on 9 May 1850. The station was designed in an "Italianate-style" by a local architect, Eli Milnes, and was furnished with an island platform underneath a train shed that was 120 feet (37 m) long and 63 feet (19 m) wide. One of the local newspapers, the Bradford Observer, described the station as being "..somewhat low and has a deficiency of glass".

In January 1867, a sinuous s-shaped connection (Note: The s-shaped connection is 65 chains (4,300 ft; 1,300 m) in length and took over two years to construct due to the various mines, the topology in the region and the necessity to tunnel underneath Wakefield Road 132 yards (121 m).) from the Leeds, Bradford and Halifax Junction Railway (LB&HJR) at Hammerton Street, allowed the diversion of services from that railway line, now operated by the Great Northern Railway, (Note: The LB&HJR was absorbed completely into the GNR in 1865.) to operate into Drake Street instead of the original LB&HJR terminus at Adolphus Street. Adolphus Street was deemed to be too far out of the city centre, and passengers were using the Midland station (Market Street, later Forster Square) instead. The s-shaped link between Mill Lane Junction and Hammerton Street was an uphill gradient of 1 in 49 in a cutting 60 feet (18 m) deep in places. This was known to be challenging for steam trains leaving Exchange in the Leeds direction.

The initial improvements at Drake Street to accommodate the LB&HJR/GNR services amounted to just one more additional island platform, giving four lines available for services. (Note: An accident report from May 1884, states that the station had six lines of platforms available for services. It's possible that some of the goods lines were accounted for in this report as most other sources state that the station had four platforms available for passengers.) This was deemed to not be enough space to accommodate all existing services, even when the works were ongoing and improvements could have been implemented. 125 services made use of Drake Street/Exchange on a daily basis, being split with about 60 GNR services, and the others operated by the L&YR in the form of timetabled, goods, and market days traffic. The cost was given as £8,000, which some have stated was quite a small sum for effectively doubling in size, especially as to how the later 1888 expansion scheme, cost £300,000.

On 16 January 1871, a train descending from Low Moor through Bowling Tunnel, arrived at Exchange station going too fast, with one witness stating that he could see sparks coming from the brake blocks on the engine wheels. The engine ploughed into the station platform end (no. 4 lines) and mounted up the buffer blocks crushing a man between the engine and the back wall of the station. He died soon afterward, whilst the fireman was fatally injured when he jumped from the train and had his ribs punctured by a "switch handle". He died a week later.

The 1888 expansion saw the station furnished with 10 platforms, and an overall glass roof in two sections, each spanning 100 feet (30 m) in width designed by William Hunt, an L&YR engineer. The height from the rails to the apex of the glass sheds was 52 feet (16 m), and the shed was supported from girders in the walls, the extreme edge platforms and a row of centre girders down the middle of the station. Apart from the very centre island platform, which was 24 feet (7.3 m), the platforms were 17 feet 6 inches (5.33 m) wide. The centre island platform was wider to accommodate the girders supported the glass roof.

Bradford Exchange railway station layout 1920

The new station was operated as two halves, with platforms 1 – 5 belonging to the L&YR at the western end, and platforms 6 – 10 operated by the GNR at the eastern end. Both sides of the station had their own turntable and sidings, with the GNR side having a small goods area and warehouse. This was known as Vicar Lane, with the entire GNR section being built on the former L&YR goods area. The L&YR operated their own larger 5-road large warehouse on the other side of Bridge Street, which opened in 1884 before the 1888 renovations, and retained ownership of the station completely. The access and exit lines from the station mirrored the platform layouts, with two tracks at the west used by the L & Y, with two tracks at the eastern side used by the GNR. Crossovers between the lines was effected at Mill Lane Junction, which is still the dividing point to this day for the lines towards Leeds and Halifax.

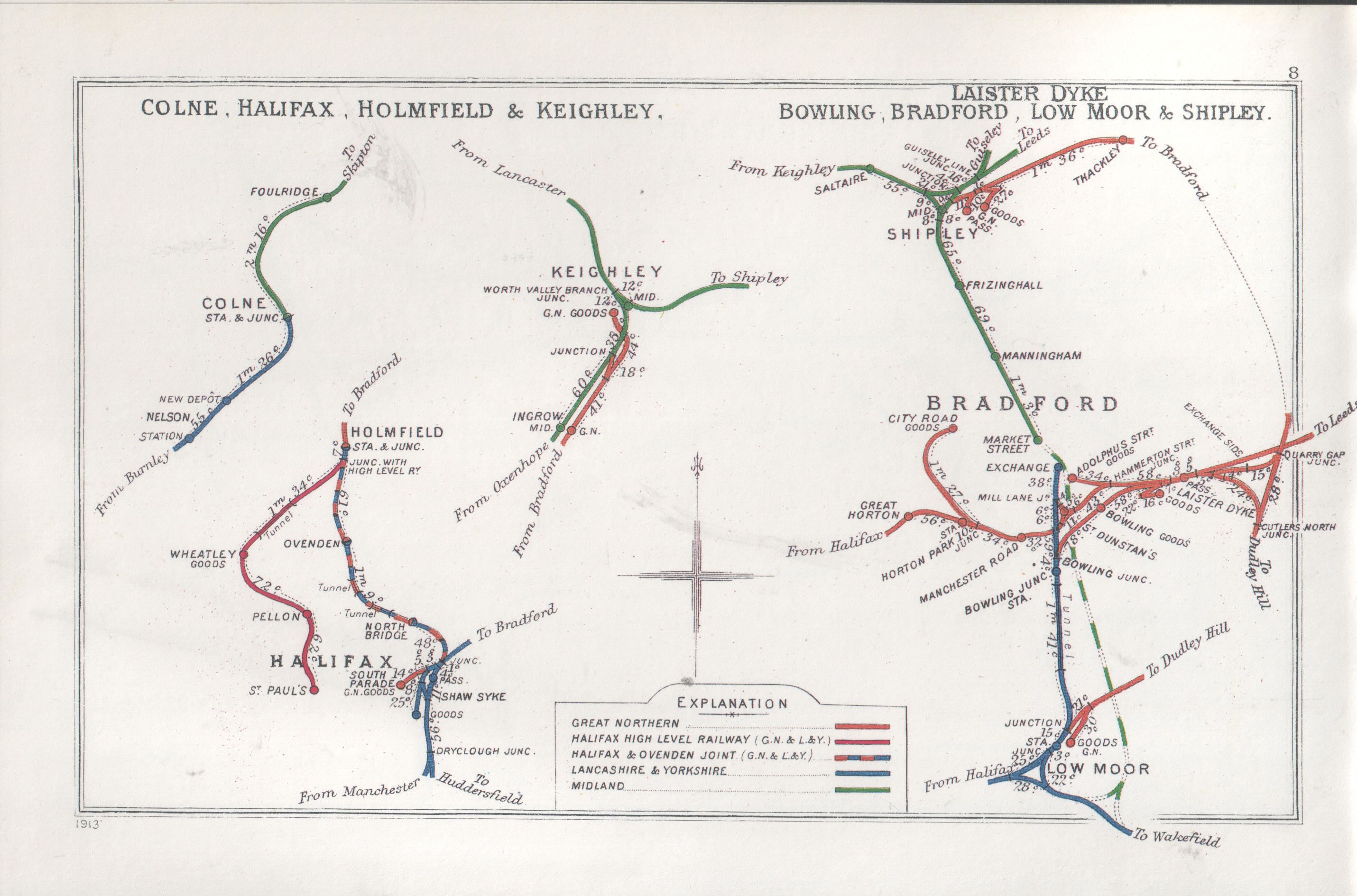
Colne, Halifax, Holmfield & Keighley Laister Dyke, Bowling, Bradford, Low Moor & Shipley

On 3 June 1964, a DMU from Manchester Victoria to Leeds Central railway station collided with a stationary parcels train in the station. The driver and another railway employee were killed, with a further 16 people being injured, and 12 of those needing hospitalisation.

The loss of rail traffic throughout the 20th century and the run-down of longer-distance services, led to a downturn in traffic at Exchange. In 1967, inspections of the bridge immediately to the south of the station (originally known as Wakefield Road, then later as Bridge Street), revealed some severe corrosion which would take some time to repair. Maintenance issues were also cited for the station, and so a proposed new £7 million interchange station, combining bus and rail, was announced in 1969. In 1972, the five lines leading to the L&YR portion of the station were disconnected to allow for the new station to be built on their formation, and allowing the former GNR lines to be kept open for residual traffic until the new station could be opened.

The former Exchange railway buildings were demolished in 1976, though a retaining wall on the north side is still in situ. The site was later used as a car park, before Bradford Law Courts were built on it.

== Services ==
From opening, the Lancashire & Yorkshire railway services were sending trains up and down the Spen Valley line between Low Moor and Mirfield. In April 1910, this amounted to 29 services through Cleckheaton Central railway station, with services heading for Dewsbury (Market Place), (Note: Dewsbury station was opened by the L & Y in 1867. It was renamed Market Place in 1924.) Huddersfield and Mirfield.

Great Northern services increased in 1878 with the introduction of the services along the Queensbury lines to Halifax and Keighley. Initially, five trains a day left Exchange station for the Queensbury direction and two left Laisterdyke. These were later changed to all run from Exchange station and by 1947 when the LNER was running the former GNR services, 19 trains were heading towards Queensbury per day; with most going to Halifax.

Under British Rail in the early 1950s, Exchange station was one of the first stations in Britain to receive services with the new DMUs which operated between Exchange and Leeds Central.

== Closure ==
Dependent on the author, differing opinions are given about the closure of the Bradford Exchange railway station, as in 1973, the station was moved 0.25 miles (0.40 km) south of its original location. (Note: Body states that the station was moved in 1977.) Some state that the station merely moved as it retained its name of Exchange, not becoming Bradford Interchange until a later date (which is also disputed as to when that name change occurred). Those who list the closure of the 10-platform Exchange station include Cobb, and Joy. Bairstow states that Exchange opened in May 1850, and has never closed.

The date of the name change for the 1973 station from Exchange to Interchange is listed as being in either 1983, or 1986.

== Architecture ==
The 10-platform station, with its twin-roof shed, was noted for its architectural style, and many have stated regret over its demolition. Unlike other contemporary railway stations of their era, none of the city centre stations survives intact, save for some retaining and cutting walls. Biddle described the station as having a "..short, straight, double-arched roof, notable for its fan-like glazing bars in the gables, and delicate iron whorls and curves in the brackets." Allen Jackson labelled Exchange station as a "cathedral to railways."

The demolition of Bradford Exchange station, along with the Euston Arch, Glasgow St Enoch, and the Crumlin Viaduct, was listed by Binney and Pearce as putting "British Rail into its own category of vandal".

== Chronology ==
Chronology of Bradford Drake Street/Exchange/Interchange stations
Date	Name	Platforms	Ownership	Notes	Ref
May 1850	Drake Street	2	L&YR	Opened by the Lancashire & Yorkshire Railway (L&YR)	
January 1867	Drake Street	4	L&YR	Expanded to two island platforms to accommodate services diverted from the GNR station at Aldophus Street	
March 1867	Exchange	4	L&YR	Name change; new name derived from the nearby Wool Exchange	
1888	Exchange	10	L & Y	Expanded further due to increase in traffic	
1923	Exchange	10	LMS/LNER	The Great Northern Railway was amalgamated with other companies, forming the London and North Eastern Railway. The Lancashire & Yorkshire amalgamated with the LNWR to become the LMS.	
1948	Exchange	10	British Railways	Most railway companies and lines in mainland Great Britain were nationalised as British Railways	
1972	Exchange	5	British Rail	The westernmost platforms (1–5) were closed to allow the new station to be built on the formation of lines leading into those platforms.	
January 1973	Exchange	4	British Rail	With a decrease in traffic, and closure of the lines to Wakefield (via Dudley Hill) and the former GNR line to Queensbury, station was closed and re-sited further south (14 January 1973), later called Bradford Interchange	
March 1977	Exchange	4	British Rail	The interchange was fully opened, with the bus service area being built on the former Bridge Street goods depot which used to cover 8 acres (3.2 ha)	
May 1983	Interchange	4	British Rail	Listed as the name change as 16 May 1983	
