= Ravensthorpe Lower railway station =

Disused railway station in Ravensthorpe, West Yorkshire

Ravensthorpe
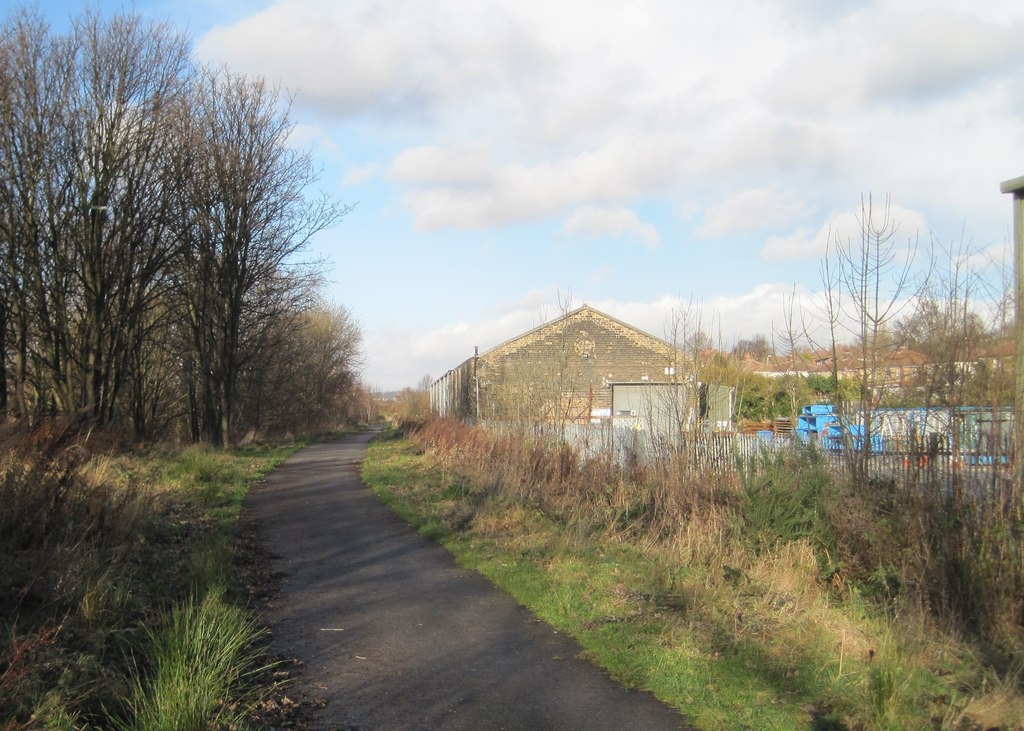
- The site of the station, looking northwest, in December 2013

General information
- Location: Ravensthorpe, West Riding of Yorkshire; England
- Coordinates: 53.6834°N 1.6543°W
- Grid reference: SE229208
- Platforms: 2

Other information
- Status: Disused

History
- Original company: Lancashire and Yorkshire Railway
- Pre-grouping: London and North Western Railway
- Post-grouping: London, Midland and Scottish Railway; British Railways (London Midland Region)

Key dates
- 1 July 1869: Opened as Ravensthorpe
- 30 September 1951: Name changed to Ravensthorpe Lower
- 30 June 1952: Closed
Location

Ravensthorpe Lower railway station served the area of Ravensthorpe, in the historical county of West Riding of Yorkshire, England, from 1869 to 1952 on the Ravensthorpe Branch.

== History ==
The station was opened as Ravensthorpe on 1 July 1869 on the Lancashire and Yorkshire Railway. To the northwest was the goods yard. Its name was changed to Ravensthorpe Lower on 30 September 1951. It closed to passengers on 30 June 1952, and goods on 1 January 1962.

== Oil Terminal ==
With the closure of the LNWR line via Liversedge Spen, British Rail opened a spur, in 1966, from the Ravensthorpe Branch through to the Liversedge Spen to still operate the Charrington Hargreaves Oil Terminal. The Charrington Hargreaves Oil terminal was mothballed in 1986 and the line was ripped up in 1992.

== Now ==
Sustrans and Kirklees Council have opened a cycle route, Spen Valley Greenway, on the track bed.

Only the goods shed is left of the Ravensthorpe Station, and the remains of a 4-aspect light signal stand just north of the existing railway line from Dewsbury to Mirfield.

== Route ==
Preceding station	Disused railways	Following station
Heckmondwike Central; Line and station closed	Ravensthorpe Branch; Lancashire and Yorkshire Railway	Thornhill; Station closed
