= Northorpe North Road railway station =

Disused railway station in Northorpe, West Riding of Yorkshire, England

Northorpe North Road
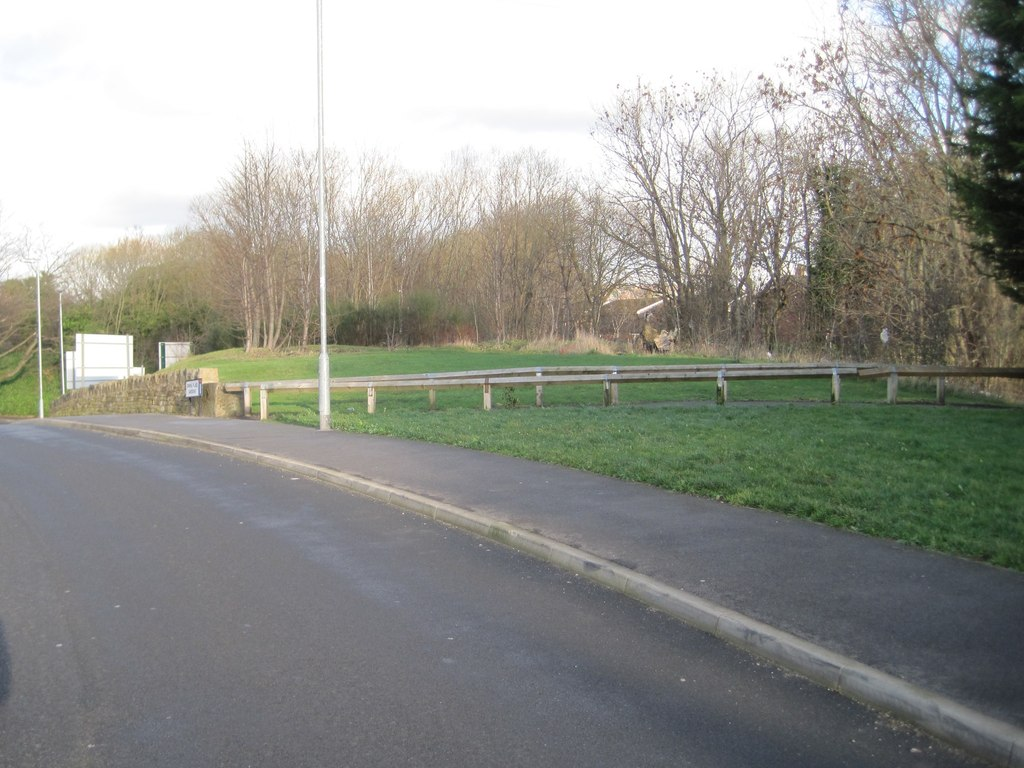
- The site of the station, looking north-east towards Heckmondwike, in December 2013

General information
- Location: Northorpe, West Riding of Yorkshire; England
- Coordinates: 53.6833°N 1.6717°W
- Grid reference: SE217208
- Platforms: 1

Other information
- Status: Disused

History
- Original company: Lancashire and Yorkshire Railway
- Pre-grouping: London and North Western Railway
- Post-grouping: London, Midland and Scottish Railway; British Rail (London Midland Region)

Key dates
- 1 December 1891: Opened as Northorpe
- 2 April 1917: Closed temporarily
- 5 May 1919: Reopened
- 2 June 1924: Name changed to Northorpe North Road
- 14 June 1965: Closed
Location

Northorpe North Road railway station served the town of Northorpe, West Riding of Yorkshire, England, from 1891 to 1965 on the Spen Valley Line.

== History ==
The station was opened as Northorpe on 1 December 1891 by the Lancashire and Yorkshire Railway. It was closed temporarily on 2 April 1917 but it reopened on 5 May 1919. Its name was changed to Northorpe North Road on 2 June 1924. The station closed permanently on 14 June 1965.

Preceding station	Disused railways	Following station
Heckmondwike Central; Line and station closed	Spen Valley Line; Lancashire and Yorkshire Railway	Mirfield; Line closed, station open
