= Spen Valley Line =

Disused railway line in West Yorkshire, England

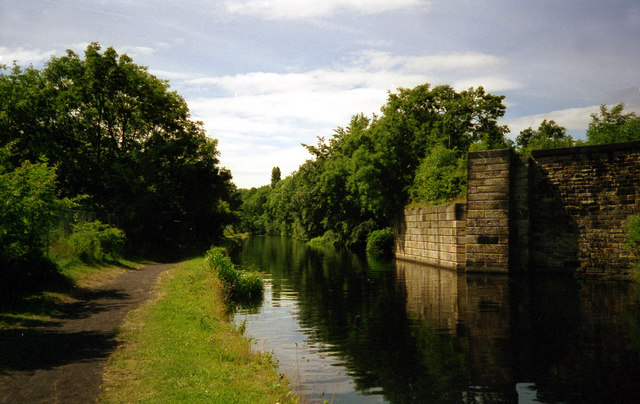
- Remains of a railway bridge over Mirfield Cut

Overview
- Other names: Mirfield and Low Moor railway
- Owner: Lancashire and Yorkshire Railway; London and North Western Railway; London Midland and Scottish Railway; British Railways
- Termini: Low Moor; Mirfield Thornhill

History
- Opened: 18 July 1848 (Mirfield to Low Moor); 1 June 1869 (Heckmondwike to Thornhill)

Technical
- Line length: 7 miles (11 km) (Mirfield to Low Moor); 2 1/2 miles (4 km) (Heckmondwike to Thornhill); 7 1/4 miles (12 km) (Thornhill to Low Moor)
- Number of tracks: 2
- Track gauge: 4 ft 8 1/2 in (1,435 mm) standard gauge

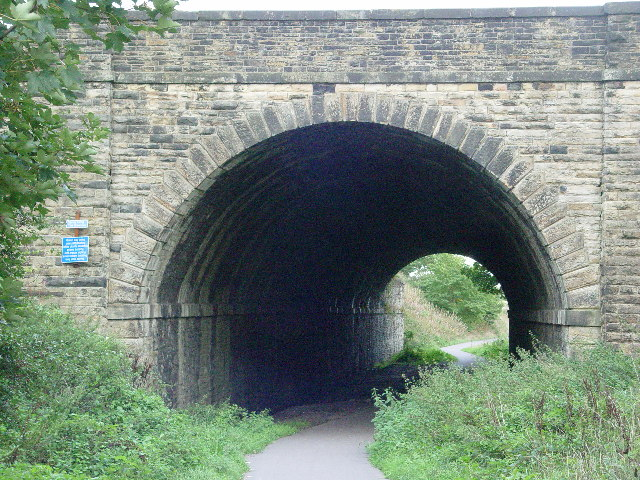
Railway tunnel

The Spen Valley Line (also known as the Mirfield and Low Moor railway) was a railway that connected Mirfield with Low Moor through the Spen Valley in West Yorkshire, England. Opened up by the Lancashire and Yorkshire Railway in 1847, with full opening to Low Moor in 1848, the line served a busy industrial and textile area (known as the Heavy Woollen District (HWD)) and allowed a connection for trains between Huddersfield and Bradford. The line was absorbed by the London and North Western Railway, the London, Midland and Scottish Railway (LMS) (on grouping) and British Railways on nationalisation. A separate link between Heckmondwike Central and Thornhill that opened later and was known as the Ravensthorpe Branch, allowed through running to Wakefield and beyond. The line was closed down to passengers in 1965 with freight continuing sporadically until 1981. A spur onto the former Leeds New Line from the Ravensthorpe Branch kept the very southern end open until the late 1980s. The majority of the route is now the Spen Valley Greenway cycle path.

== History ==
The railway was first proposed by the West Riding Union Railways (WRUR), who submitted a bill to parliament in 1846 to build 45 miles (72 km) of railways around the south west of Bradford connecting with Halifax, Huddersfield and Mirfield. The WRUR was absorbed by the Manchester and Leeds Railway, who in turn became a constituent of the Lancashire and Yorkshire Railway (L&YR) a year later. The railway's initial section between Mirfield and Cleckheaton Central opened in 1847, with full opening to Low Moor in July 1848. However, it would be two years before through running was achieved from Low Moor into Bradford, so Low Moor acted as the northern terminus; delays in tunnelling under the hill at Bowling meant that the section to Bradford Exchange did not open until May 1850. (Note: Passengers to and from Bradford had to connect to Low Moor via an omnibus; the opening of the station at Bradford Exchange (known as Bradford L & Y in its early days) was reportedly met with "welcome relief" by passengers interchanging between the two destinations.)

The distance of the line extended to almost 7 miles (11 km) between the two points with a small 2 1/2-mile (4 km) spur extending from Heckmondwike to Thornhill that had one intermediate station at Ravensthorpe. (Note: Trains Illustrated became Modern Railways in 1962.) This was part of the original WRUR bill passed in August 1846, but abandoned by the L&YR on grounds of cost. Because of the need to reverse at Mirfield to head towards the Wakefield direction, the 1846 plan for the line between Heckmondwike and Thornhill was re-submitted to parliament and approved. The line opened to traffic in June 1869.

The line was double track throughout with a triangular junction in the Low Moor area to allow trains to access the line west to Halifax. The topography of the line was fairly flat with the steepest gradient being a 1 in 100 north of Heckmondwike and the line only required two tunnels. The spur between Heckmondwike and Thornhill cut 25 minutes from the journey time between Bradford and Wakefield and also reduced the congestion at Mirfield station. The spur line had a twelve-arch viaduct across the River Calder just east of Ravensthorpe Lower station. (Note: The line was furnished with a new bridge in the early 1970s across the M62 motorway, though by then, it had closed to passengers.) The west facing curve at the northern end of the line was built by the Lancashire and Yorkshire railway in 1893 after an agreement in 1882 with the Great Northern Railway about the sharing of running powers. The L&YR used the agreement to prevent the GNR building a line through the Spen Valley which would have duplicated their route. The 1882 agreement provided the L&YR with access to GNR lines in the Wakefield and Pudsey areas. The GNR were, in return, afforded the ability to run trains from the Doncaster and Wakefield areas to Halifax either via Brighouse or Cleckheaton.

The line lost its local passenger services in July 1965 and despite Low Moor being on a line that would stay open serving trains between Halifax and Bradford, it too closed completely. (Note: Low Moor reopened to passengers in April 2017) In the 1980s, the West Riding Transport Museum, had intended to electrify the line between Low Moor and Heckmondwike to 1,500 volt direct current. This was so they could run a newly acquired Class 506 EMU on the line. The course of the line is now a cycle and footpath named the Spen Valley Greenway. There have been proposals for the railway to re-open to provide a separate service from Bradford to Huddersfield or Wakefield, however, the greenway that occupies the trackbed was dug up by Yorkshire Water in two stages during 2011 when a pipeline was installed. This was preferable to crossing roads and other means of communications but has also meant that the prospect of re-opening the line to rail traffic is diminished as the cost of moving the pipeline was estimated at £15 million in 2011.

This line has been identified by Campaign for a Better Transport as a priority 1 candidate for reopening.

=== Stations ===
From north west to south east;

- Low Moor
- Cleckheaton Central
- Liversedge Central
- Heckmondwike Central
- Northorpe North Road
- Mirfield
- Ravensthorpe Lower
- Thornhill

The stations at Cleckheaton, Liversedge Heckmondwike and Northorpe opened in July 1848. Cleckheaton, Liversedge and Heckmondwike were later renamed in 1924 each having the suffix Central appended to their names to avoid confusion with Cleckheaton Spen, Liversedge Spen and Heckmondwike Spen stations on the Leeds New Line. Bairstow, writing in the Manchester and Leeds Railway, states that in the case of Cleckheaton, the term central was very appropriate for the Spen Valley Line station as the one on the Leeds New Line was quite far from the town. Similarly, Northorpe and Ravensthorpe were renamed in 1924 by the LMS to avoid confusion with other stations in the same locations.

== Spen Valley Light Railway ==
Approval was granted to British Electric Traction (BET) by the Spen Valley Light Railway Order 1901 to the Spen Valley Light Railway for the construction of nearly 19 miles (31 km) in the Spen Valley between Dewsbury, Cleckheaton, Thornhill and Heckmondwike. This was actually a tramway and a BET subsidiary company was formed under the name Yorkshire (Woollen District) Electric Tramways Company (YWD) to run trams on the network.

== Transperience ==
Transperience, a museum dedicated to the experience of passenger transport in West Yorkshire was built on the site of Low Moor station in 1995. It also had a small section of line that used the former trackbed of the Spen Valley Railway which the museum used to run trams up and down on. The museum failed to attract the visitor numbers that it had hoped for and closed down in 1997, just two years after opening.

== Spen Valley Greenway ==
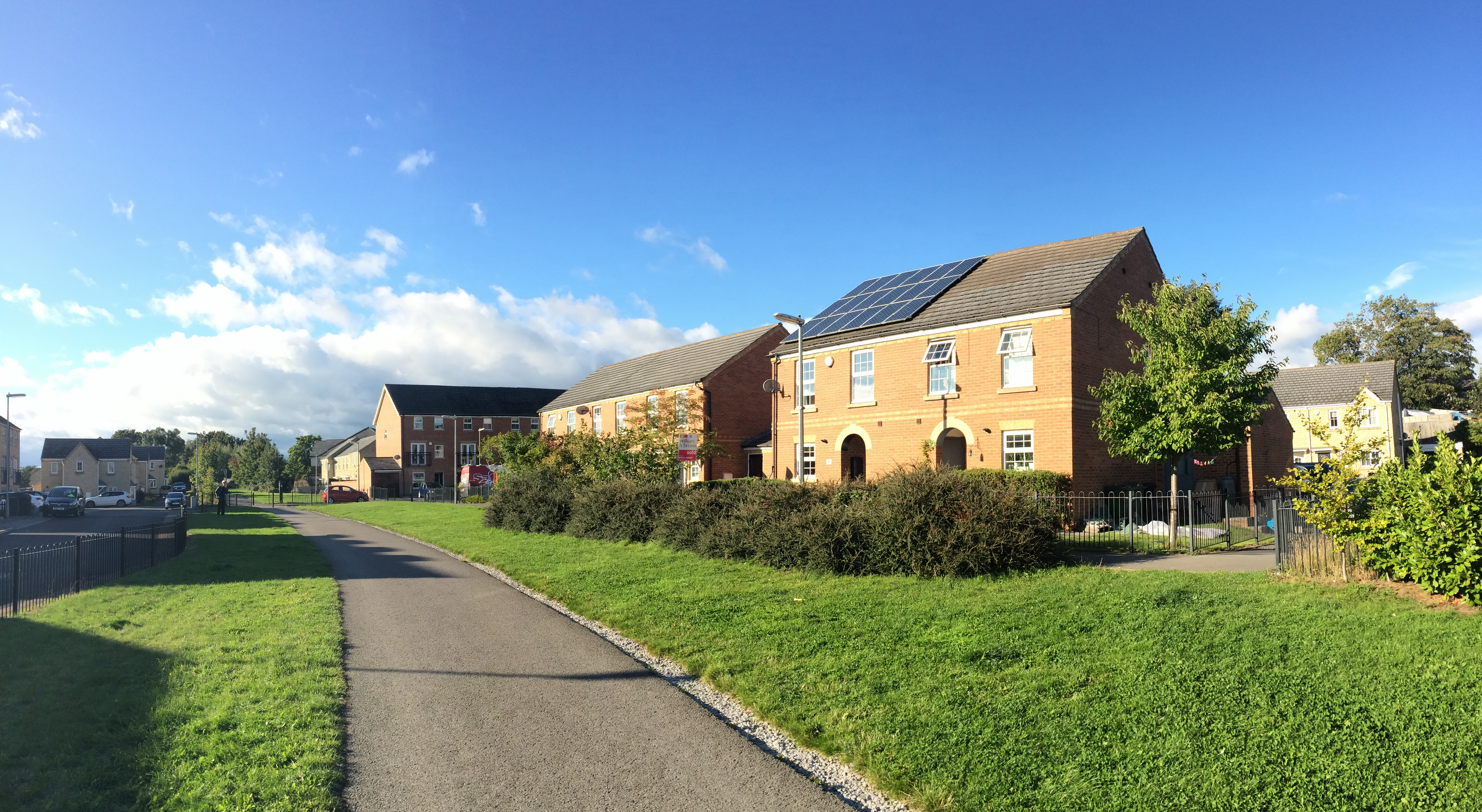
The Spen Valley Greenway passing through Heckmondwike

In 1998, Sustrans acquired the trackbed and converted it into a greenway for people on horses, foot or bicycle. The greenway is equally maintained by Sustrans and Kirklees Council, who between them, have paved the route. The greenway runs for 7 miles (11 km) on the former trackbed but the length of the route between Dewsbury and Low Moor extends to 8 miles (13 km) and is estimated to carry over 200,000 non-motorised journeys per year. In 2007, the route won first prize for mobility in the European Greenway Awards. The greenway has access to Low Moor railway station at its northern end as well as alternative routes into Bradford, and at the southern end it connects into the Calder Valley Greenway. It is part of National Cycle Route number 66 which runs between Manchester and Hull, and has been furnished with a flock of metal Swaledale Sheep and a ring of metal hoops that the walker or biker goes under whilst navigating the route.
