= Liversedge railway station =

Disused railway station in Liversedge, West Yorkshire, England

Liversedge
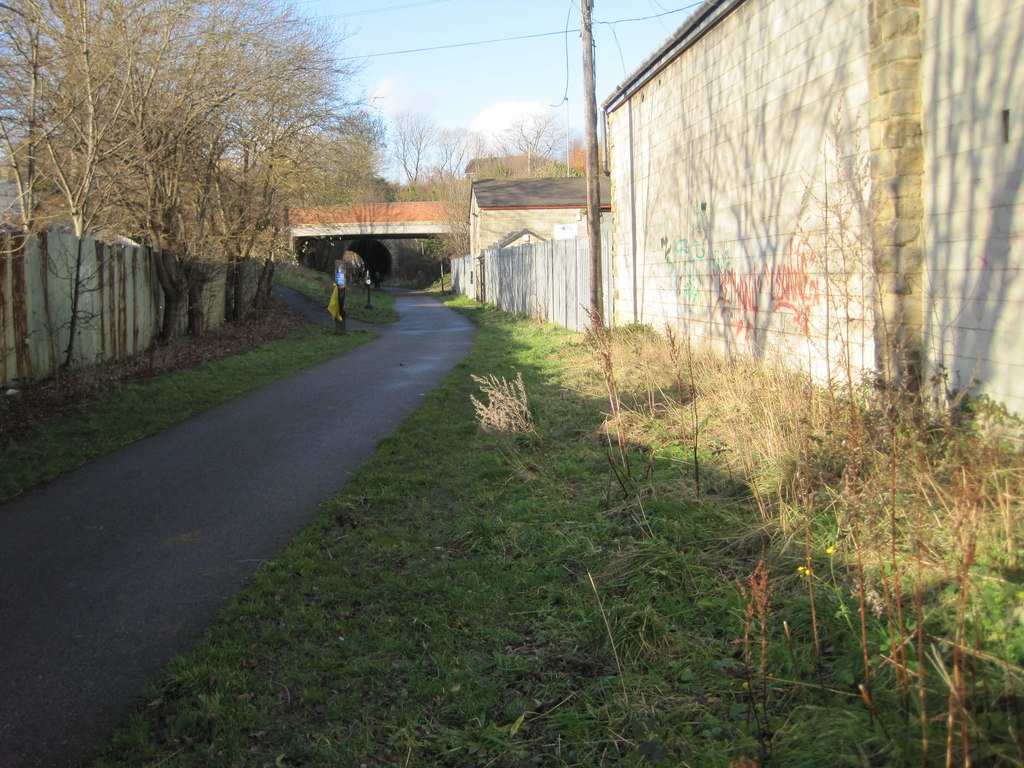
- The site of the station in December 2013

General information
- Location: Liversedge, West Riding of Yorkshire; England
- Coordinates: 53.7106°N 1.6959°W
- Grid reference: SE201238
- Platforms: 2

Other information
- Status: Disused

History
- Original company: Lancashire and Yorkshire Railway
- Pre-grouping: London and North Western Railway
- Post-grouping: London, Midland and Scottish Railway; British Rail (London Midland Region)

Key dates
- 18 July 1848: Opened as Liversedge
- 2 June 1924: Name changed to Liversedge Central
- 12 June 1961: Name changed back to Liversedge
- 14 June 1965: Closed
Location

Liversedge railway station served the town of Liversedge, in the historical county of West Riding of Yorkshire, England, from 1848 to 1965 on the Spen Valley Line. It is one of two disused stations in Liversedge, the other being Liversedge Spen.

== History ==
The station was opened as Liversedge on 18 July 1848 by the Lancashire and Yorkshire Railway. 'Central' was added onto its name on 2 June 1924 but it was later dropped on 12 June 1961. It closed on 14 June 1965. The Goods Shed has remained, however the building has been added to since the railway has gone.

Preceding station	Disused railways	Following station
Cleckheaton Central; Line and station closed	Spen Valley Line; Lancashire and Yorkshire Railway	Heckmondwike Central; Line and station closed
