= Ravensthorpe, West Yorkshire =

Area of Dewsbury in West Yorkshire, England

Coordinates: 53.6795°N 1.6614°W

Ravensthorpe
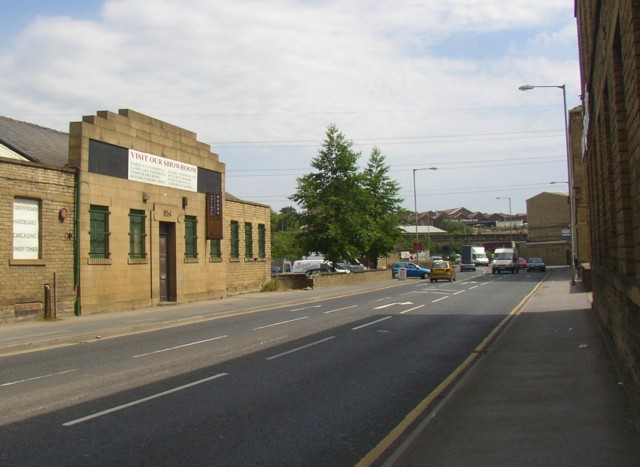
- Huddersfield Road

- Location within West Yorkshire
- Metropolitan borough: Kirklees
- Metropolitan county: West Yorkshire
- Region: Yorkshire and the Humber
- Country: England
- Sovereign state: United Kingdom
- Post town: DEWSBURY
- Postcode district: WF13
- Police: West Yorkshire
- Fire: West Yorkshire
- Ambulance: Yorkshire

Ravensthorpe is an area of Dewsbury, in West Yorkshire, England. Historically part of the West Riding of Yorkshire, Ravensthorpe is on the western outskirts of Dewsbury and is part of the "Dewsbury West" ward in the district of Kirklees. The area has always been heavily industrial and was once bustling with textile mills.

== History ==
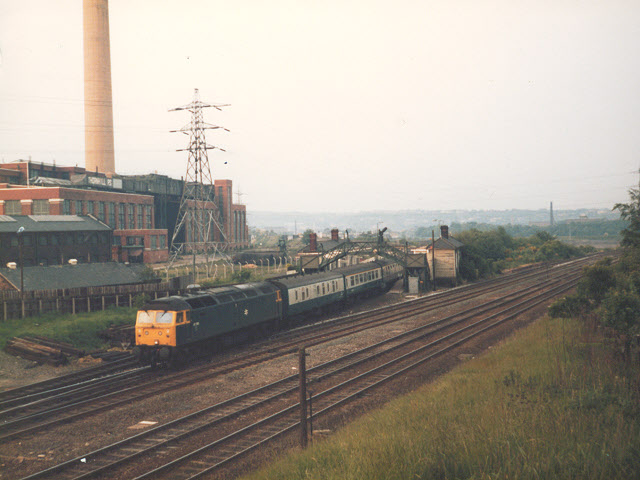
Ravensthorpe power station and railway station.

Despite its appearance, Ravensthorpe is not in fact a Norse name, but was coined in the 19th century by a local clergyman and historian to fit in with other Norse-named settlements in the area. It was formerly called Newtown and a large gasworks was built here in 1857. Ravensthorpe did not exist as a community until the middle of the 19th century when large numbers of houses were constructed alongside the new textile mills. The Church of St Saviour was built in 1864 but was replaced in 1901 by a large Gothic revival church (Grade II listed).

Before the building of textile mills in the 1870s the main economic activity in the area was the production of malt for the brewing industry and coke production based around the mine in the Shill Bank area.

Following the Second World War, large areas of Ravensthorpe were demolished as part of the slum clearance programme.

On 31 December 1894 Ravensthorpe became a civil parish, being formed from the part of the parish of Mirfield in Ravensthorpe Urban District, on 1 April 1925 the parish was abolished and merged with Dewsbury. In 1921 the parish had a population of 6719. From 1894 to 1910 Ravensthorpe was an urban district.

There is a railway station in Ravensthorpe, off Calder Road, opened in the 19th century, near the Thornhill power station. The station is on the Huddersfield Line and has a regular service to Huddersfield, Dewsbury and Leeds.

== See also ==
- Listed buildings in Dewsbury
