= Heckmondwike railway station =

Disused railway station in Heckmondwike, West Yorkshire, England

Heckmondwike

General information
- Location: Heckmondwike, West Riding of Yorkshire; England
- Platforms: 1

Other information
- Status: Disused

History
- Original company: Lancashire and Yorkshire Railway
- Pre-grouping: London and North Western Railway
- Post-grouping: London, Midland and Scottish Railway; British Rail (London Midland Region)

Key dates
- 18 July 1848: First station opened as Heckmondwike
- 9 August 1888: Resited
- 2 June 1924: Name changed to Heckmondwike Central
- 12 June 1961: Name changed back to Heckmondwike
- 14 June 1965: Closed

Heckmondwike railway station was one of two stations to serve the town of Heckmondwike, in the historical county of West Riding of Yorkshire, England, the other being Heckmondwike Spen.

== History ==
=== First station ===
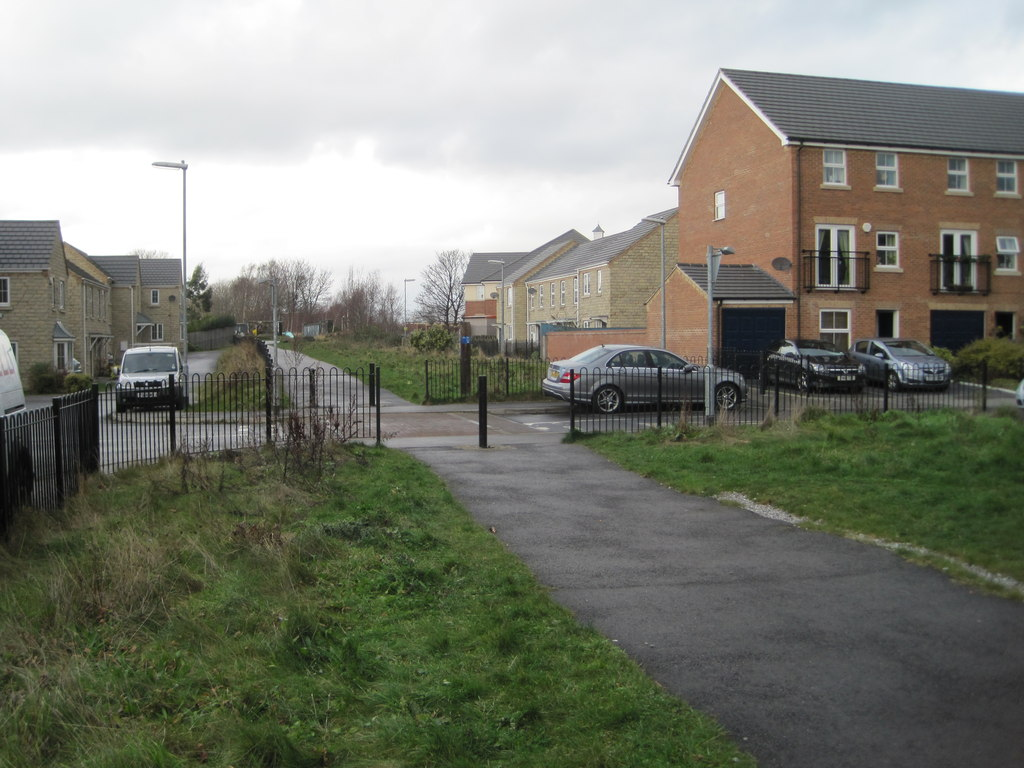

Coordinates: 53.7041°N 1.6747°W
The first station was opened as Heckmondwike on 18 July 1848 by the Lancashire and Yorkshire Railway. It had a goods yard and a station building. The station closed on 9 August 1888 and was resited.

=== Second station ===
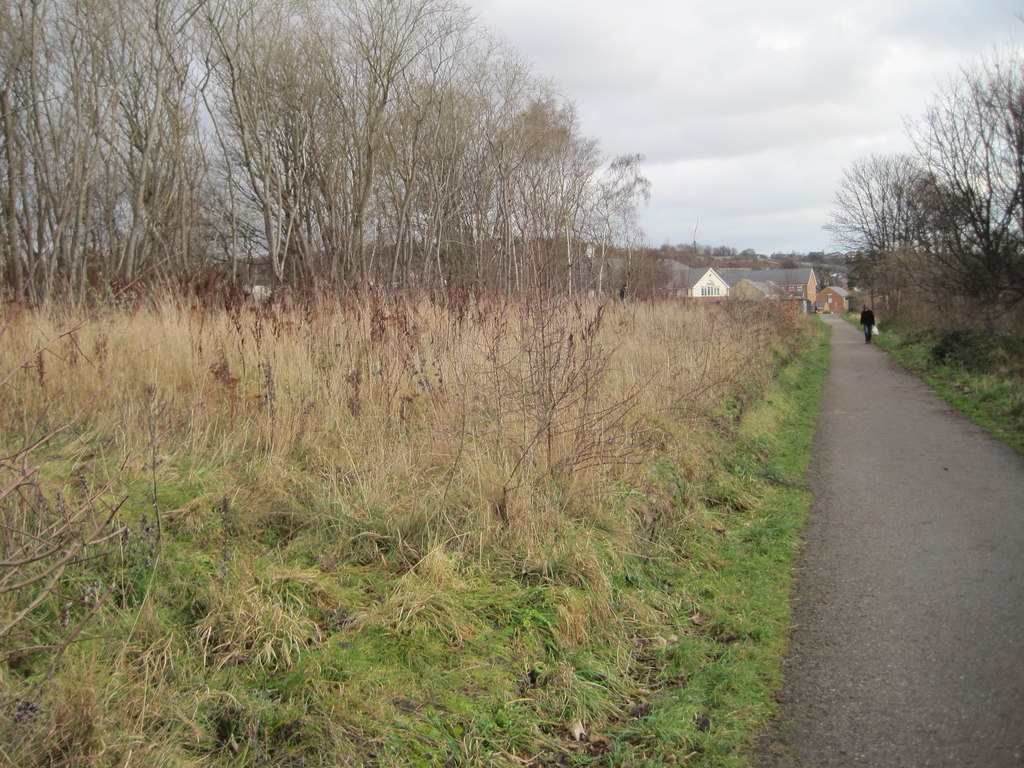

Coordinates: 53.7045°N 1.6764°W
The station was resited to the west and opened as Heckmondwike on 9 August 1888. The goods yard was not moved from the original station. Its name was changed to Heckmondwike Central on 2 June 1924 but it was changed back to Heckmondwike on 12 June 1961 (As the other railway station in Heckmondwike, Heckmondwike Spen closed the previous year). It closed on 14 June 1965 but excursions later ran: one to Scarborough on 18 June 1978 and a working man's excursion to Morecambe on 17 June 1979. There was no platform by then so the work men had to use the steps to board the train.

== Route ==
| Preceding station | Disused railways | Following station |
|---|---|---|
| Liversedge; Line and station closed | Spen Valley Line; Lancashire and Yorkshire Railway | Northorpe North Road; Line and station closed |
| Liversedge; Line and station closed | Ravensthorpe Branch; Lancashire and Yorkshire Railway | Ravensthorpe Lower; Line and station closed |

== Now ==
Sustrans with Kirklees Council have opened a cycle route, National Cycle Route 66, on the old railway track
