= Liversedge Spen railway station =

Disused railway station in Liversedge, West Yorkshire

Liversedge Spen
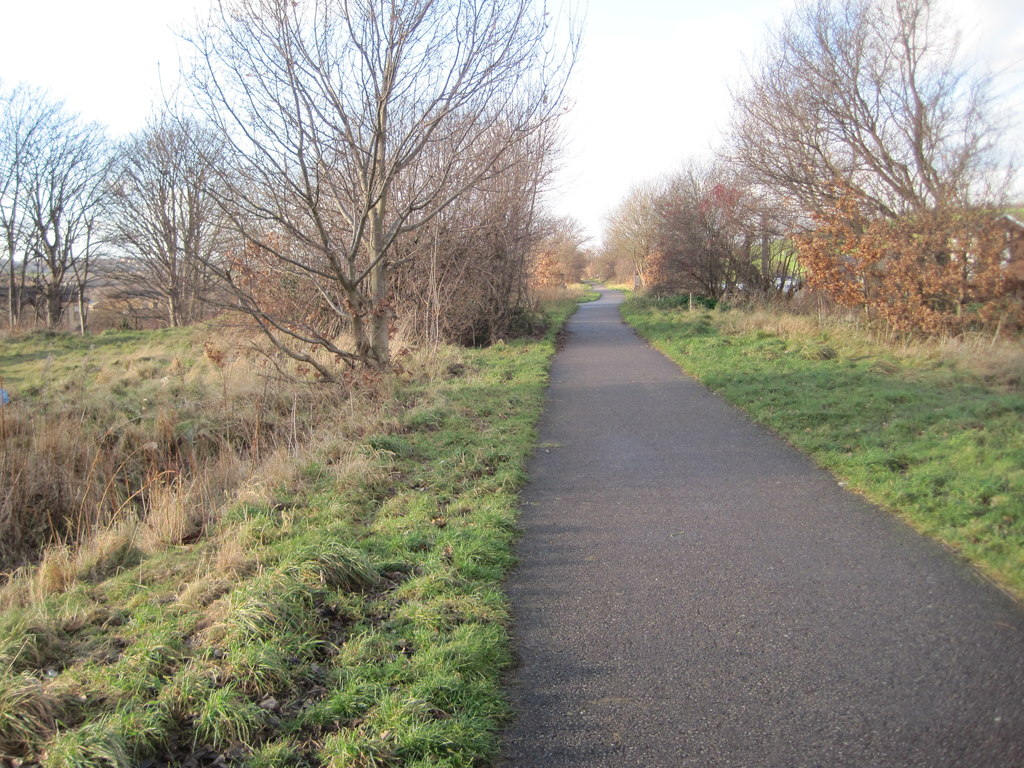
- The site of the station, looking northwest towards Cleckheaton Spen, in 2013

General information
- Location: Liversedge, West Riding of Yorkshire; England
- Coordinates: 53.7145°N 1.6884°W
- Grid reference: SE206242
- Platforms: 2

Other information
- Status: Disused

History
- Original company: London and North Western Railway
- Pre-grouping: London and North Western Railway
- Post-grouping: London, Midland and Scottish Railway; British Railways (London Midland Region)

Key dates
- 1 October 1900: Opened as Liversedge
- 2 June 1924: Name changed to Liversedge Spen
- 5 October 1953: Closed
Location

Liversedge Spen railway station served the town of Liversedge, in the historical county of West Riding of Yorkshire, England, from 1900 to 1953 on the Leeds New Line. It is one of two disused stations in Liversedge, the other being Liversedge station.

== History ==
The station was opened as Liversedge on 1 October 1900 by the London and North Western Railway. It was briefly known as Liversedge Littletown. The goods yard, which opened on 1 November 1900, consisted of seven sidings and had stables and warehouses. Stanley Colliery was also nearby. 'Spen' was added to the station's name on 2 June 1924. It closed on 5 October 1953.

Preceding station	Disused railways	Following station
Cleckheaton Spen; Line and station closed	Leeds New Line; London and North Western Railway	Heckmondwike Spen; Line and station closed
