= Cleckheaton Central railway station =

Disused railway station in West Yorkshire, England

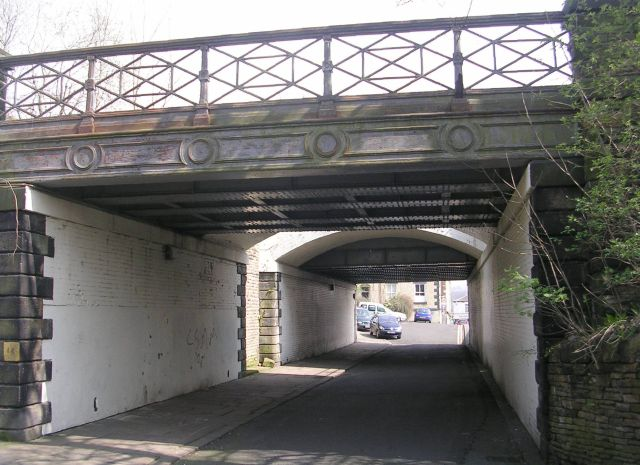
- The entrance to the central island platform was on the left between the two bridges, photo taken in April 2008.

General information
- Location: Cleckheaton, Kirklees; England
- Coordinates: 53.724380°N 1.715723°W
- Grid reference: SE188253
- Platforms: 2 (removed)

Other information
- Status: Disused

History
- Original company: Lancashire and Yorkshire Railway
- Pre-grouping: LNWR
- Post-grouping: LMS

Key dates
- 1847: opened
- 14 June 1965: closed (passengers)
- May 1969: closed (goods)
Location

Cleckheaton Central railway station was a railway station serving the West Yorkshire town of Cleckheaton, England, until it was closed in the Beeching era, which saw the closure of many minor lines and stations around the United Kingdom through the 1960s. It has the distinction of being the only British railway station to have been stolen. It is one of two disused stations in Cleckheaton, the other being Cleckheaton Spen.

== History ==
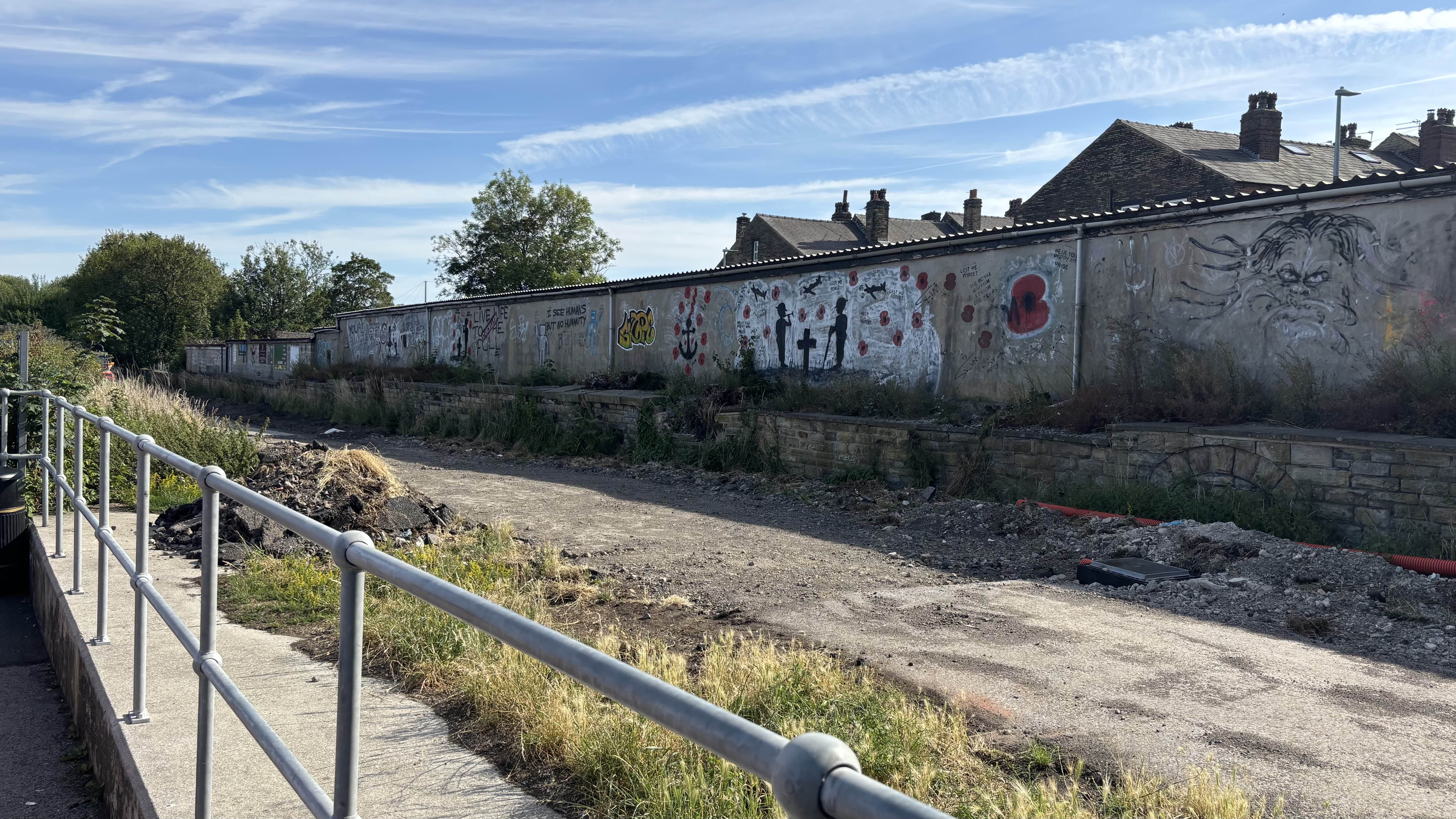
The existing remains of the station platform, now adjacent to a Tesco car park. Photo taken July 2025.

The station was originally constructed by the Lancashire and Yorkshire Railway, which was absorbed by the LNWR in 1922 and subsequently the LMS in 1923 at grouping and finally to British Rail on nationalisation. It served traffic from Heckmondwike, Low Moor (near Bradford) and Mirfield. The Mirfield line opened in 1848 and through to Low Moor in 1849. The last passenger train working was the service from Bradford on 12 June 1965 arriving at Cleckheaton at 11:21 p.m.; the station closed to freight traffic some four years later.

In 1998, the remains of the station's railway bed were converted into part of the Spen Valley Greenway, a greenway for people on horses, foot or bicycle.

The land that the station once stood is now occupied by a series of garages, and the car park of the local Tesco Superstore. As of July 2025, the site remains unmarked, with no mention of the station at its original location.

== Theft case ==
The passenger station buildings were demolished by British Rail in February 1968 - but the stone-built island platform remained in situ for a few years more.

In 1972 a Dewsbury man appeared at Wakefield Crown Court accused of stealing stone, timber, metal, track, chairs and even the buffer stops from the site; in the words of the prosecution counsel "what the case really comes to is that this man last August in effect stole Cleckheaton station". In August 1971 British Rail had made a contract with another contractor who would clear the site and had the permission to sell and retain the proceeds from disposal of all materials and any scrap. However, on arrival, the firm discovered that the station and most of the material had already gone. It transpired that the defendant had been contracted by another company to clear the site. After he had been given an advanced sum to hire plant equipment, he had spent three weeks clearing the site. Subsequent efforts to trace the second firm failed. The court found the man not guilty deciding that he had been duped and left significantly out of pocket. The case is cited as an example of how the Theft Act 1968 can be extended to cover goods forming part of a property.

Preceding station	Disused railways	Following station
Low Moor	L&Y	Liversedge
