= Low Moor railway station =

Railway station in West Yorkshire, England

Low Moor
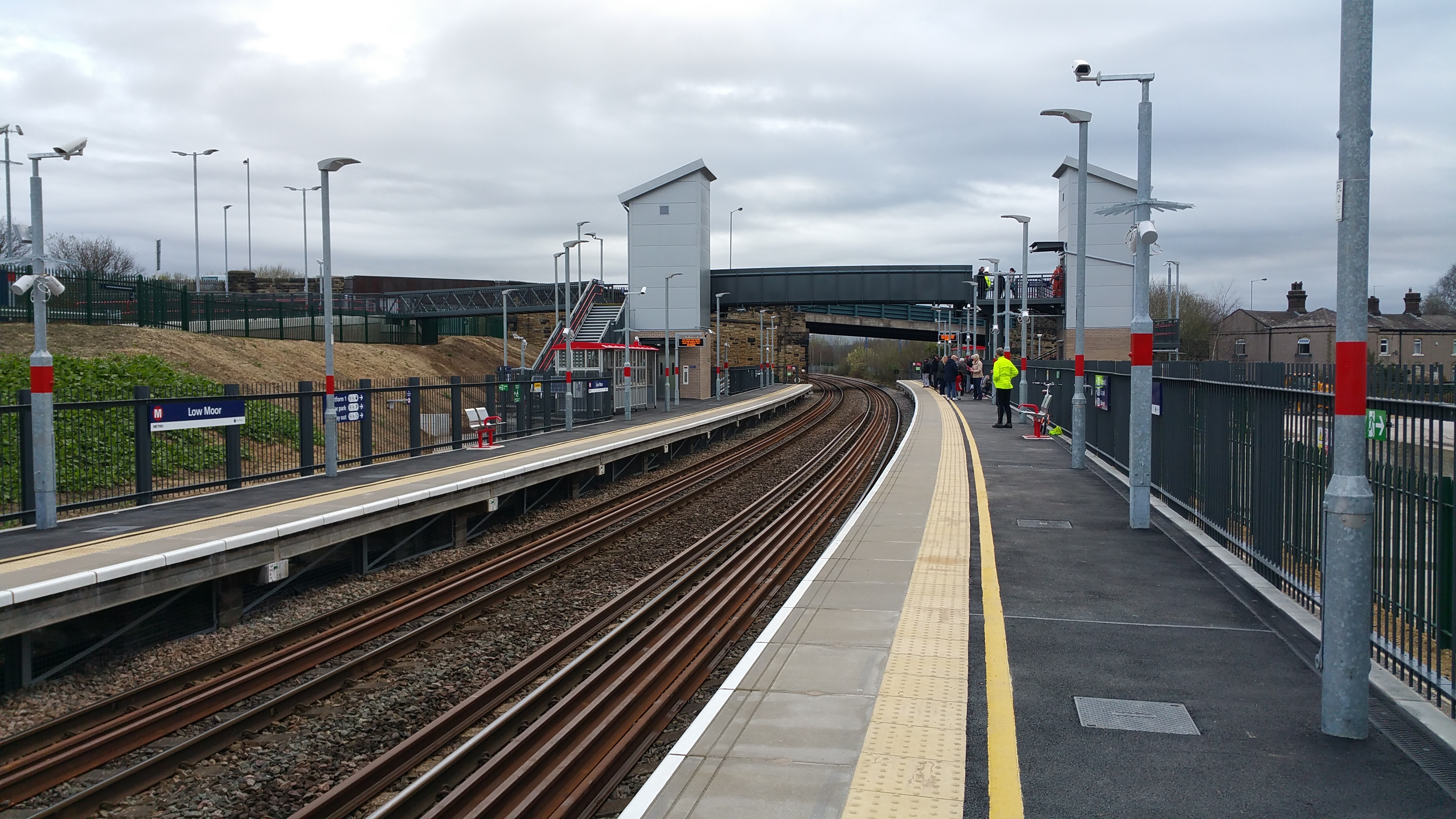
- Low Moor station on the day of re-opening

General information
- Location: Low Moor, City of Bradford; England
- Coordinates: 53.74924°N 1.750517°W
- Grid reference: SE164281
- Manager: Northern
- Transit authority: West Yorkshire (Metro)
- Platforms: 2

Other information
- Station code: LMR
- Fare zone: 3

History
- Pre-grouping: Lancashire and Yorkshire Railway

Key dates
- 18 July 1848: Opened
- 14 June 1965: Closed
- 2 April 2017: Re-opened

Passengers
- 2020/21: ▼49,294
- 2021/22: ▲0.152 million
- 2022/23: ▲0.199 million
- 2023/24: ▲0.250 million
- 2024/25: ▲0.292 million
Location
Notes
- Passenger statistics from the Office of Rail and Road

Low Moor railway station serves the villages of Low Moor and Oakenshaw in the south of Bradford, West Yorkshire, England. The station is situated on the Calder Valley Line between Bradford Interchange and Halifax.

The present station at Low Moor was opened on 2 April 2017. One train per hour serves the station in both directions, and there are also four direct Grand Central services to London King's Cross each day.

Station facilities include 128 car parking spaces, CCTV, accessible platforms, waiting shelters, passenger information displays and public address system.

== Transport links ==
The station is promoted as a Park and Ride facility, being close to the M62 and M606 motorways. There is also direct access to the Spen Valley Greenway cycle track, part of National Cycle Route 66.

Bus service 268, operated by Arriva provides regular onward connections towards Bradford city centre, Cleckheaton, Liversedge, Heckmondwike, Dewsbury and Wakefield.

== Original station ==
The original station at Low Moor was situated at the junction of two routes - the line to Halifax and Greetland through the Calder Valley and that via the Spen Valley to Mirfield via Cleckheaton, both built by the Manchester and Leeds Railway. It opened in 1848 and initially acted a terminus for both lines, as the continuation towards Bradford Exchange was not yet complete (the tunnels north of the station and at Bowling were still under construction at this point). Through running to Bradford eventually began in 1850, to Manchester Victoria in January 1852 and to Leeds via Stanningley (over the Leeds, Bradford and Halifax Junction Railway) in 1854. Low Moor quickly became an important interchange station, as there was initially no direct route between Bradford Exchange and the LB&HJR route to Leeds and so many trains to/from Halifax and Manchester carried portions for both cities that were attached or joined here (a practice that continued even after Exchange was expanded and linked to the Leeds route in 1867).

A connection to Dudley Hill was later built by the GNR in 1892 and facilities extended accordingly - by the turn of the century there were four platforms in use, along with a large goods yard and loco depot.

The introduction of DMUs over the Calder Valley route in January 1962 saw the loss of much of its interchange traffic and in June 1965, it was closed to passenger traffic under the Beeching axe along with the Spen Valley Line. Goods traffic ceased two years later and the station was then demolished.

The station site was later used for the Transperience museum which was open for a brief period in the 1990s. The Spen Valley Greenway was built on the route of the Spen Valley line after its closure to freight in 1981, as far as Thornhill Junction in Dewsbury.

== Present station ==
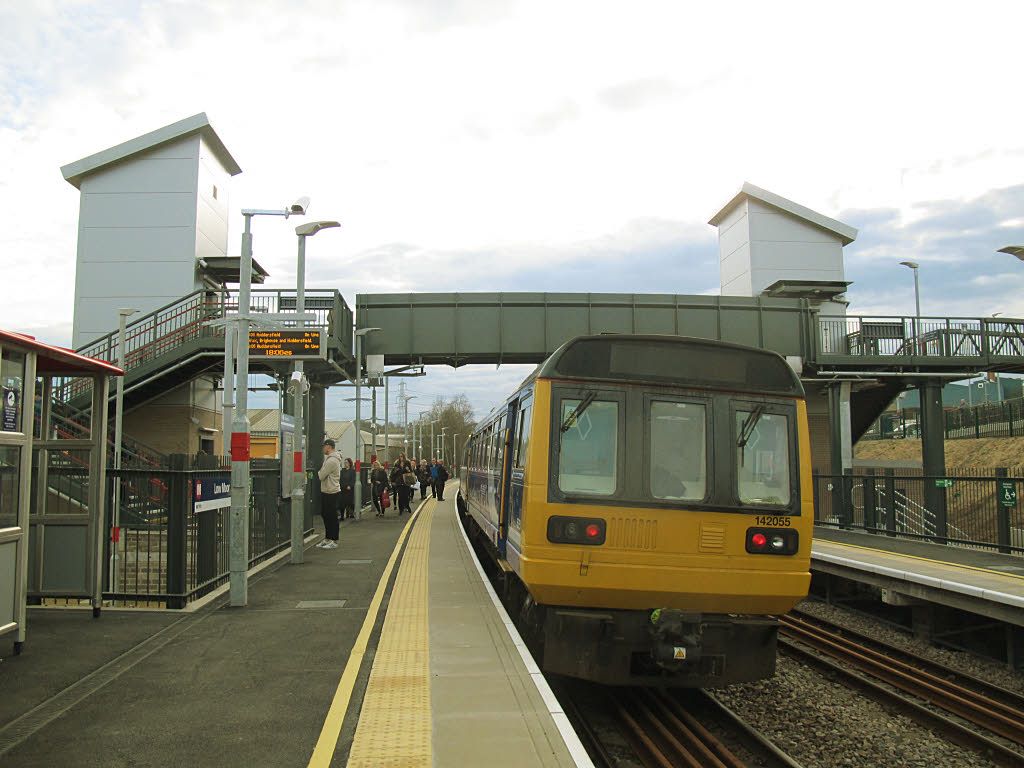
A Class 142 at the station shortly after opening

Metro planned to build a new station at Low Moor by 2011–2012, despite then-local operator Northern Rail opposing the proposal due to the time constraints on services. A lack of capacity on the line meant that development was put on hold through 2008–09, until track improvement work at Mill Lane Junction in Bradford was completed and a new timetable introduced.

In June 2009, £5.5 million funding was allocated for the station and it was announced that a detailed design plan and business case would be developed. These were completed in May 2010, confirming the station's location on New Works Road.

After the 2010 general election and subsequent Spending Review, a further assessment of the West Yorkshire Strategic Programme of Schemes confirmed that the new station at Low Moor remained a key priority within the transport aspirations of West Yorkshire. The public consultation for the scheme was held in November 2011.

Estimated completion was delayed into 2015, as the curvature of the track led to complications meeting engineering safety requirements for the new platforms. West Yorkshire Integrated Transport Authority (WYITA) released funding for the station in March 2014 and submitted a planning application to Bradford Council.

There were further delays during construction of the car park over suspected disused mine workings. Exhaustive surveys initially could not verify their precise locations, but two were eventually discovered under the station site.

Opening was delayed to summer 2016, and then to May 2017. This date was revised again, and the station opened to passenger trains on Sunday, 2 April 2017. The total cost of the project was £10.8 million.

== Service pattern ==
Currently, Low Moor has the following service pattern:

- One train per hour to Leeds
- One train per hour to Huddersfield via Brighouse
- One train per hour to Bradford Interchange only
- One train per hour to Chester via Manchester Victoria
- Four direct trains per day to London Kings Cross via Wakefield Kirkgate

From the winter 2019 timetable change, the Huddersfield service starts/terminates at Bradford rather than running through to Leeds on weekdays and Saturdays, but to compensate for this the hourly Leeds - Manchester Victoria - Chester service started calling throughout the day. Sunday services remain unchanged (hourly services to Leeds and Huddersfield, plus three London trains).

Preceding station	National Rail	Following station
Halifax	Northern; Calder Valley Line	Bradford Interchange
Halifax	Grand Central; London - Bradford	Bradford Interchange
	Disused railways	
Bowling Junction; Line open, station closed	L&Y; Calder Valley Line	Wyke and Norwood Green; Line open, station closed
Bowling Junction; Line open, station closed	L&Y; Calder Valley Line	Dudley Hill; Line and station closed
Terminus	L&Y; Spen Valley Line	Cleckheaton Central; Line and station closed
