= Mirfield railway station =

Railway station in West Yorkshire, England

Mirfield
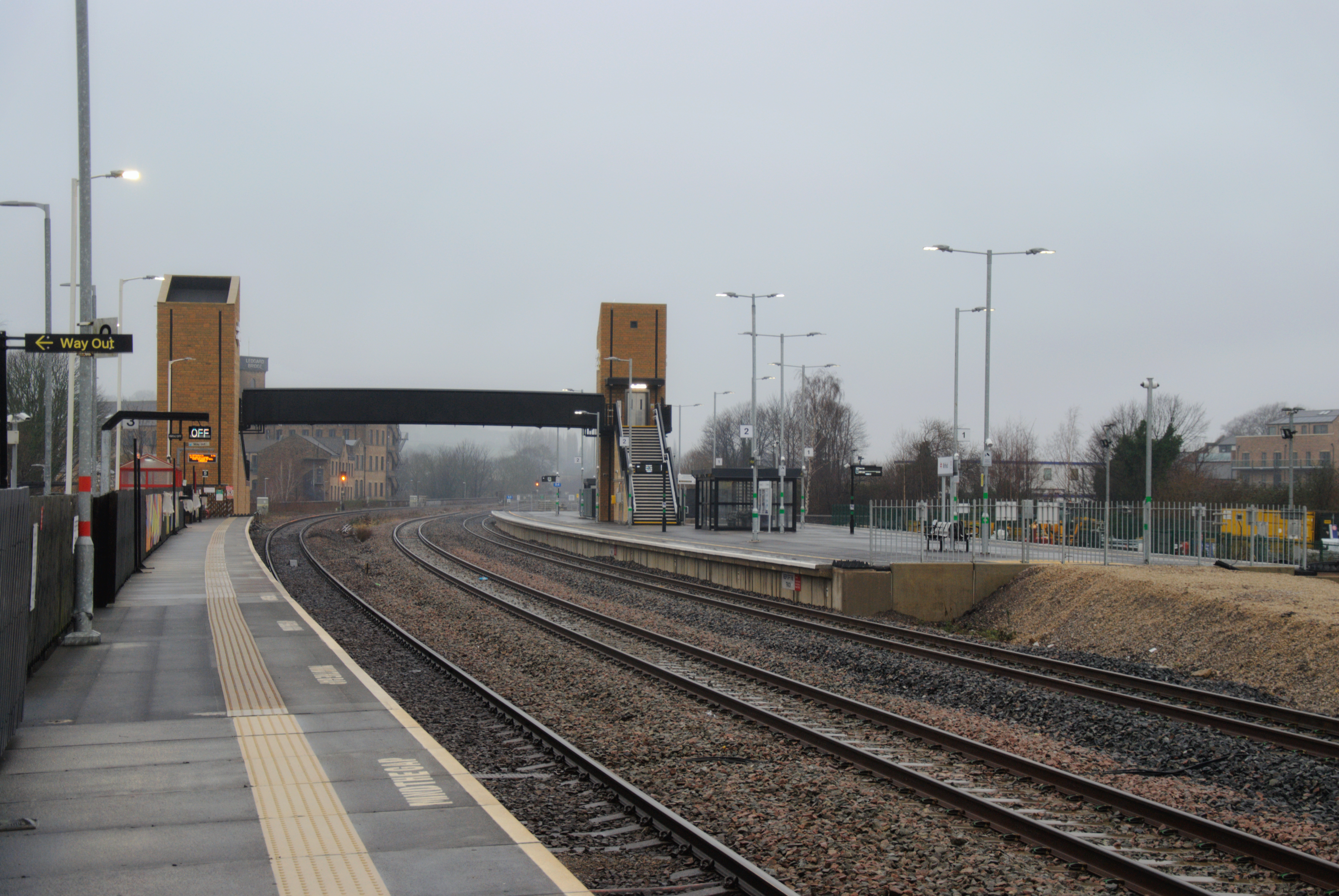
- Mirfield Station, facing west, taken from platform 3 in January 2026

General information
- Location: Mirfield, Kirklees; England
- Coordinates: 53.6716°N 1.6933°W
- Grid reference: SE203195
- Manager: Northern
- Transit authority: West Yorkshire Metro
- Platforms: 3 (platform 3 soon to be demolished)

Other information
- Station code: MIR
- Fare zone: 3
- Classification: DfT category F1

History
- Original company: Manchester and Leeds Railway
- Pre-grouping: Lancashire and Yorkshire Railway
- Post-grouping: London, Midland and Scottish Railway

Key dates
- April 1845: First station opened
- 5 March 1866: Station resited

Passengers
- 2020/21: ▼0.102 million
- 2021/22: ▲0.323 million
- Interchange: 24,263
- 2022/23: ▲0.375 million
- Interchange: ▼20,168
- 2023/24: ▼0.357 million
- Interchange: ▲22,330
- 2024/25: ▲0.364 million
- Interchange: ▲43,652
Location
Notes
- Passenger statistics from the Office of Rail and Road

Mirfield railway station serves the town of Mirfield in West Yorkshire, England. It lies on the Huddersfield Line and Calder Valley line and is managed by Northern and also receives services by Grand Central and TransPennine Express. The station is 4 miles (6 km) north east from Huddersfield.

The platforms have an unusual configuration. Platforms 1 and 2 form an island platform on the western side of the bridge over Station Road/Hopton New Road. Trains from Platform 1 go to Leeds and Wakefield Kirkgate (eastbound); Platform 2 has rarely been used for normal scheduled services since the 1990s and, until December 2025, temporarily had no track serving it. Platform 3 is a side platform on the eastern side of the bridge; trains are towards Huddersfield, Halifax, Bradford Interchange and Brighouse (westbound). The train to Leeds takes around 25 minutes, and to Huddersfield takes around 10 minutes.

== History ==
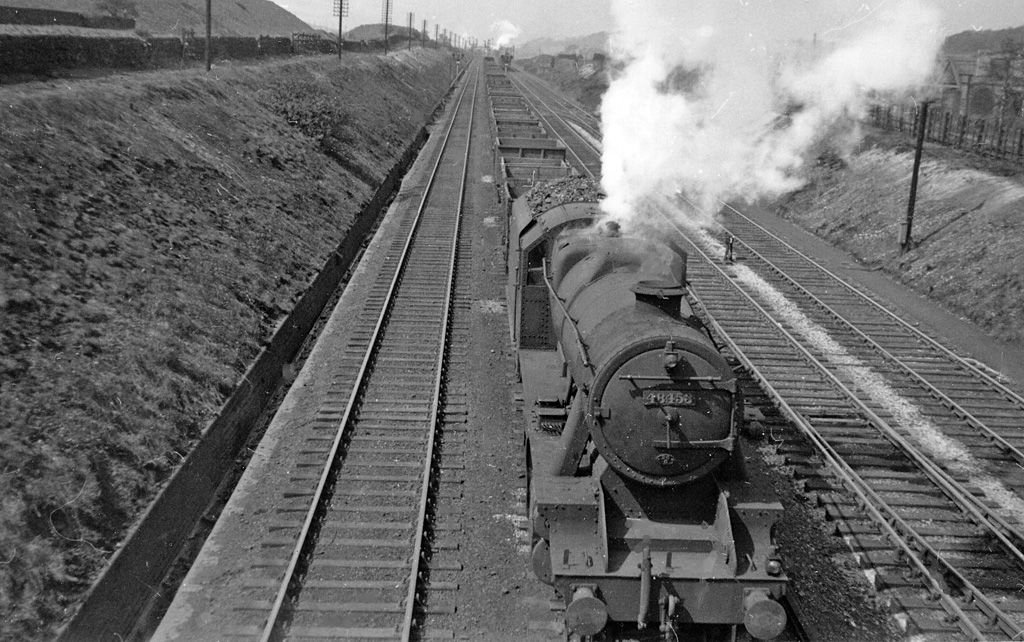
Eastbound empties west of Mirfield in 1950

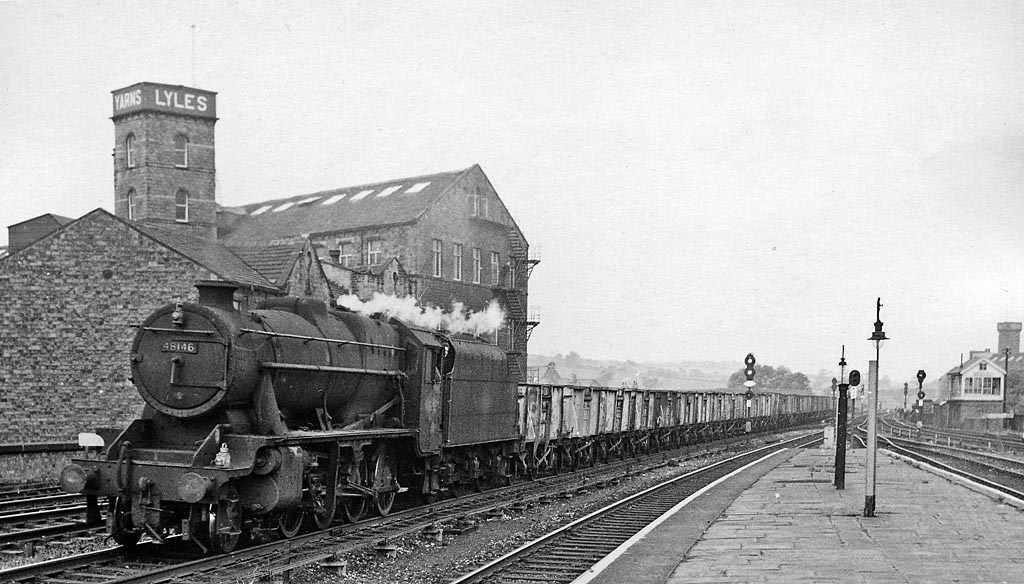
Eastbound empties passing Mirfield Station in 1964

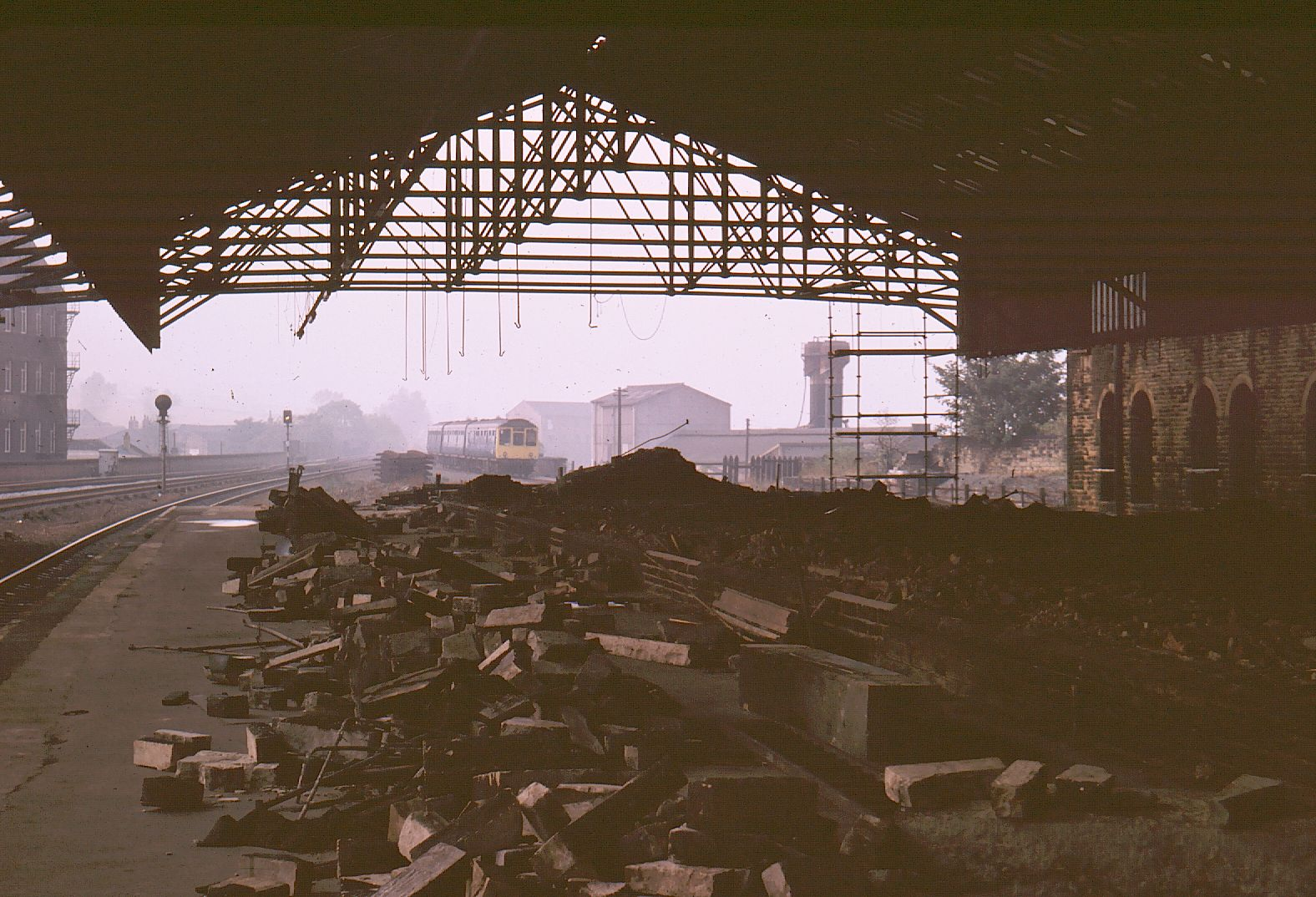
Overall roof being demolished, October 1977

The town received its first railway in 1840, when the Manchester and Leeds Railway opened the first section of its cross-Pennine main line between Normanton and Hebden Bridge (completing it through to Manchester on 1 March 1841). It did not actually get a station though until April 1845, when the company opened one shortly before submitting plans to Parliament to build a branch line from the town along the Spen Valley to Bradford via Cleckheaton. Approval was granted for the route the following year and it was opened as far as Low Moor on 12 July 1848 and through to Bradford two years later. By this time further lines had been opened from nearby Heaton Lodge Junction to Huddersfield by the Huddersfield & Manchester Railway (opened on 3 August 1847) and from Thornhill to Leeds by the Leeds, Dewsbury & Manchester Railway (opened 18 September 1848). The LNWR (which had absorbed both the H&M and LD&M by 1849) had originally planned to build its own route through Mirfield, but after negotiations with the Lancashire and Yorkshire Railway (successors to the M&L) agreed not to go ahead in return for the granting of running powers over the Thornhill to Heaton Lodge section (and also allowing the L&Y access to Huddersfield). This meant that the railway passing through the town soon became extremely congested, carrying as it did the traffic on two main trunk routes between Manchester and Leeds (the Huddersfield & Manchester company having completed its route through Stalybridge in August 1849) and it led to the station gaining a notorious reputation for delays. This persisted even after the Heaton Lodge - Thornhill section was quadrupled in 1884, and it was not until the LNWR opened an alternative Huddersfield to Leeds route at the turn of the century that the situation began to improve. To facilitate interchange, a new station was built 202 yd (185 m) to the east of the original; the contract for the station (excluding roof) was placed on 25 May 1864, the roof contract being placed on 26 April 1865. The new station centred on a large island platform with overall roof, and facilities included a hotel, buffet and billiard room; it opened on 5 March 1866.

Today the station remains busy, despite the loss of the Spen Valley service to Bradford from 14 June 1965 and the links to Normanton and York on 5 January 1970 (the line via Brighouse also closed at the same time, but this reopened in 2000 for peak hour services). It has also lost its buildings to demolition (in the mid-1980s) and one of its four tracks, but gained the aforementioned third platform as part of a set of capacity improvements in the late 1980s.

== Facilities ==
The station is unstaffed and has a ticket machine available on the main island platform. Digital display screens, timetable posters and automated announcements provide train running information. Shelters are provided on each platform. With the recent upgrade in late 2025, the station now has full step-free access via a ramp from the car park (to platform 3) and lifts installed with the new footbridge. Two braille maps have also been installed beside the lifts. With the aforementioned station upgrade, the island platform has been fully remodelled to cater for 6 car services. Platform 3 is expected to be removed by 2027 to allow for space for overhead line equipment installation.

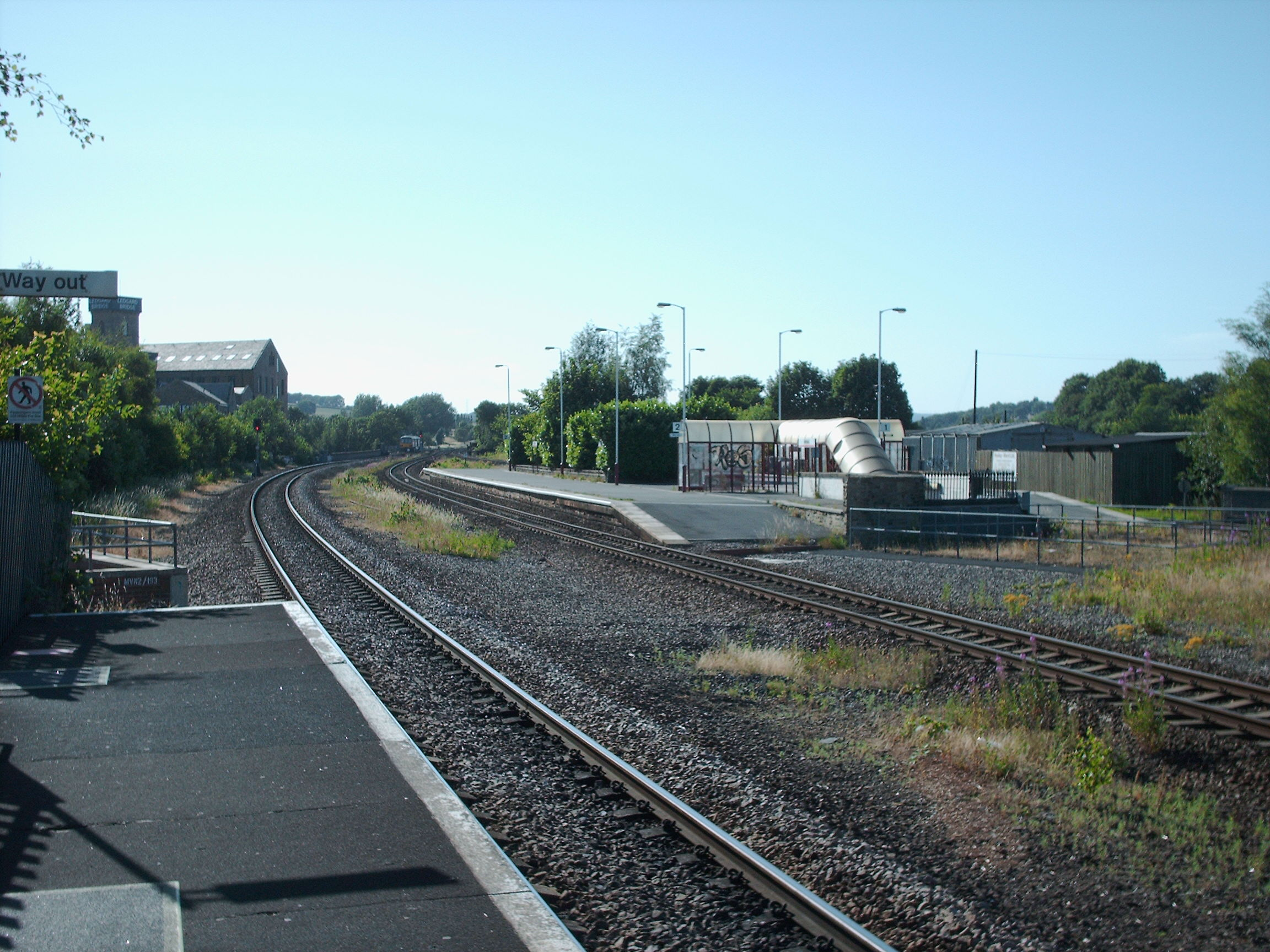
Mirfield June 2006

== Services ==
=== Northern ===
Eastbound from Mirfield, an hourly service to Leeds. Services to Wakefield and Castleford no longer run - the regular service that once ran was suspended during the COVID-19 pandemic and was never properly reinstated TransPennine Express now serves this route and stops here (see below) with a through service between York and Manchester Piccadilly.

Westbound - there is an hourly daytime service to Manchester Victoria and Wigan Wallgate via Brighouse and Hebden Bridge - this was introduced as part of the December 2008 timetable alterations on the Calder Valley Line. During the TRU upgrade, the local Northern stopping service to Huddersfild isn't operating; it runs instead to Brighouse (where a bus link is available to Huddersfield), Halifax and Bradford Interchange.

There are no Northern services on a Sunday.

=== TransPennine Express ===
Since the May 2018 timetable change, TransPennine Express services now call here twice each hour in each direction seven days per week. Eastbound, there is an hourly stopping service calling at local stations to Leeds, whilst westbound trains call at Deighton and Huddersfield; alternate services continue to Stalybridge and Manchester Piccadilly. There is now also a regular service to York via Wakefield Kirkgate, which replaces the now defunct Northern local service to Wakefield and was introduced at the December 2023 timetable change.

=== Grand Central – West Riding ===
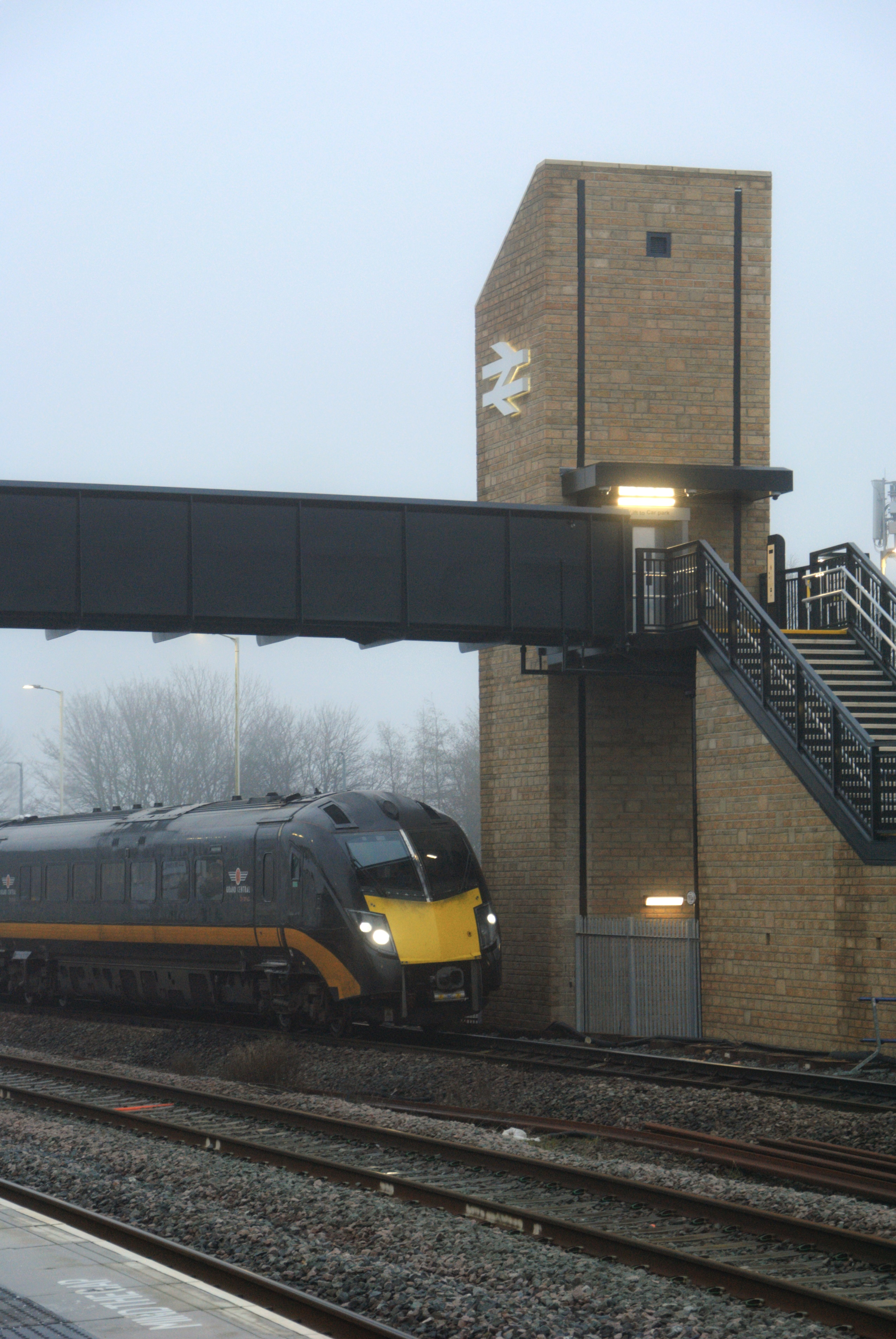
Grand Central Class 180 departing Mirfield Station in January 2026

The station sees several direct services to London Kings Cross via Wakefield Kirkgate, Pontefract and Doncaster, which commenced on 23 May 2010, however, Mirfield was not a calling point until the December 2011 timetable change. In January 2009, Grand Central Railway had their application for train paths to run a Bradford Interchange (via Halifax and Brighouse) to London service accepted by the Office of Rail Regulation. In the December 2017 timetable, four trains call in each direction throughout the week (including Sundays). This service temporarily stopped during the COVID-19 pandemic but resumed in December 2020.

== Future ==
In February 2019, it was revealed that Mirfield was in line for a new station as part of the £3 billion TransPennine Route Upgrade. The plans involve the reconstruction and lengthening of the current platforms 1 and 2 on what will become the 'slow' lines between Heaton Lodge and Thornhill LNW junctions, along with the restoration of the fourth line to complete the 'fast' lines between those two points. The existing platform 3 will be demolished under this scheme.

The rebuilt island platform, which is fully accessible via lift, opened to traffic on 27 December 2025.

== Notes ==
Preceding station	National Rail	Following station
Deighton	TransPennine Express; North TransPennine (Manchester - Leeds)	Ravensthorpe
Deighton	Northern; Huddersfield Line (Huddersfield - Wakefield Kirkgate)	Wakefield Kirkgate
Brighouse	Grand Central; West Riding (Bradford Interchange - London Kings Cross)	Wakefield Kirkgate
Brighouse	Northern; Calder Valley Line (Southport - Leeds)	Dewsbury
	Disused railways	
Northorpe North Road (Line and station closed)	LYR Spen Valley Line	Terminus
