= Thornhill railway station =

Disused railway station in West Yorkshire, England

Thornhill
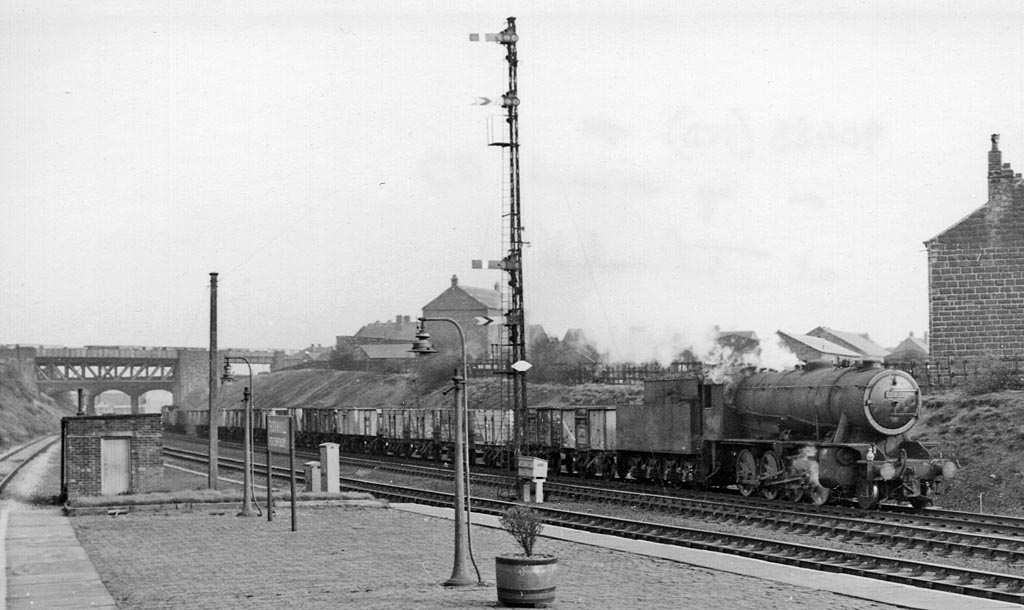
- Eastward from Thornhill Station in 1961

General information
- Location: Thornhill, Kirklees; England
- Coordinates: 53.67598°N 1.63344°W
- Grid reference: SE243200

Other information
- Status: Disused

History
- Original company: Manchester and Leeds Railway
- Pre-grouping: Lancashire and Yorkshire Railway
- Post-grouping: London, Midland and Scottish Railway

Key dates
- 5 October 1840: Opened as Dewsbury
- January 1851: Renamed Thornhill
- 1 January 1962: Closed
Location

Thornhill (for Dewsbury) Railway station, as it was latterly known since the closure (1930) of its sister Market Place Passenger Station in the town centre; was located between Mirfield and Horbury and Ossett stations.

== History ==
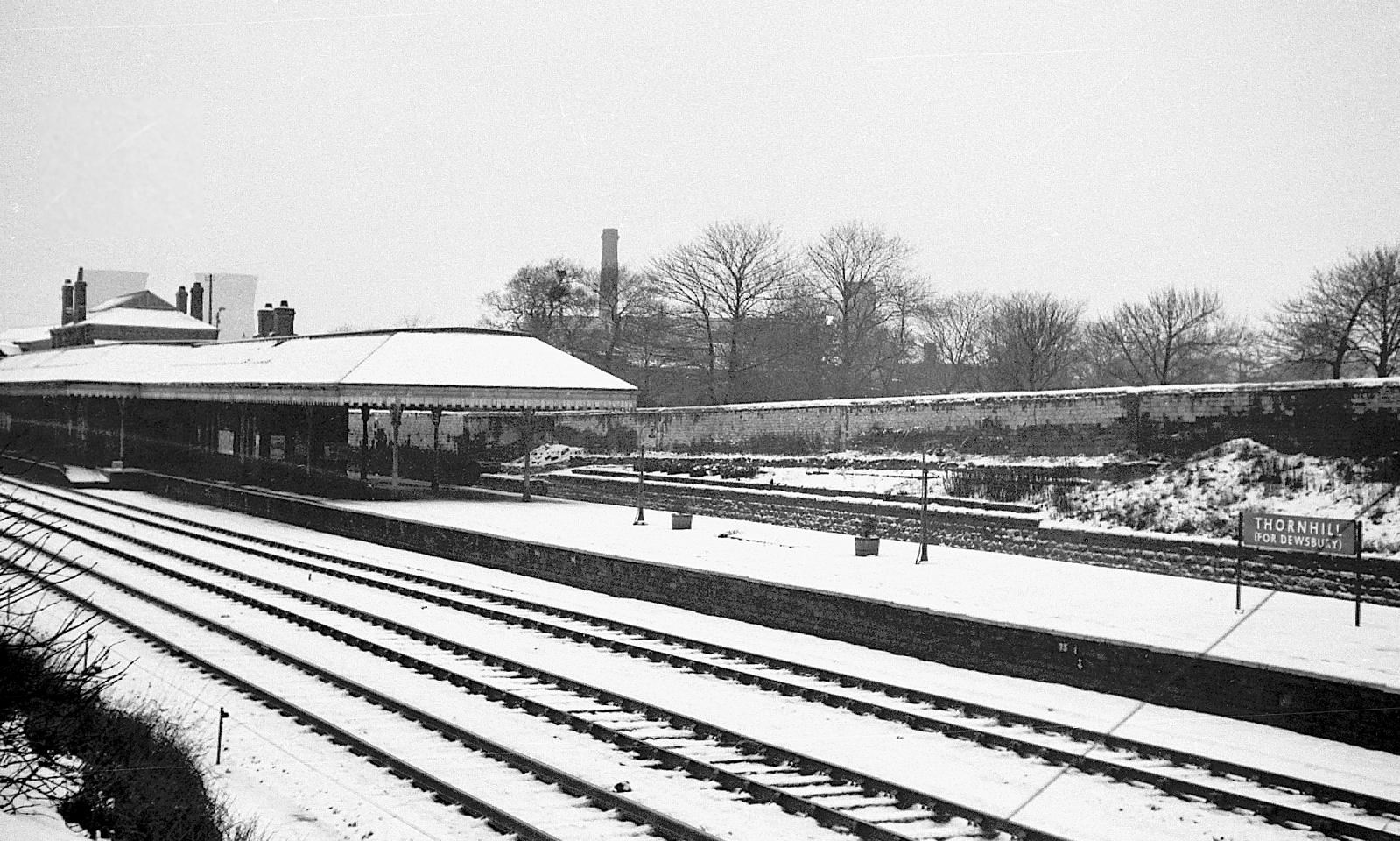
Station platforms

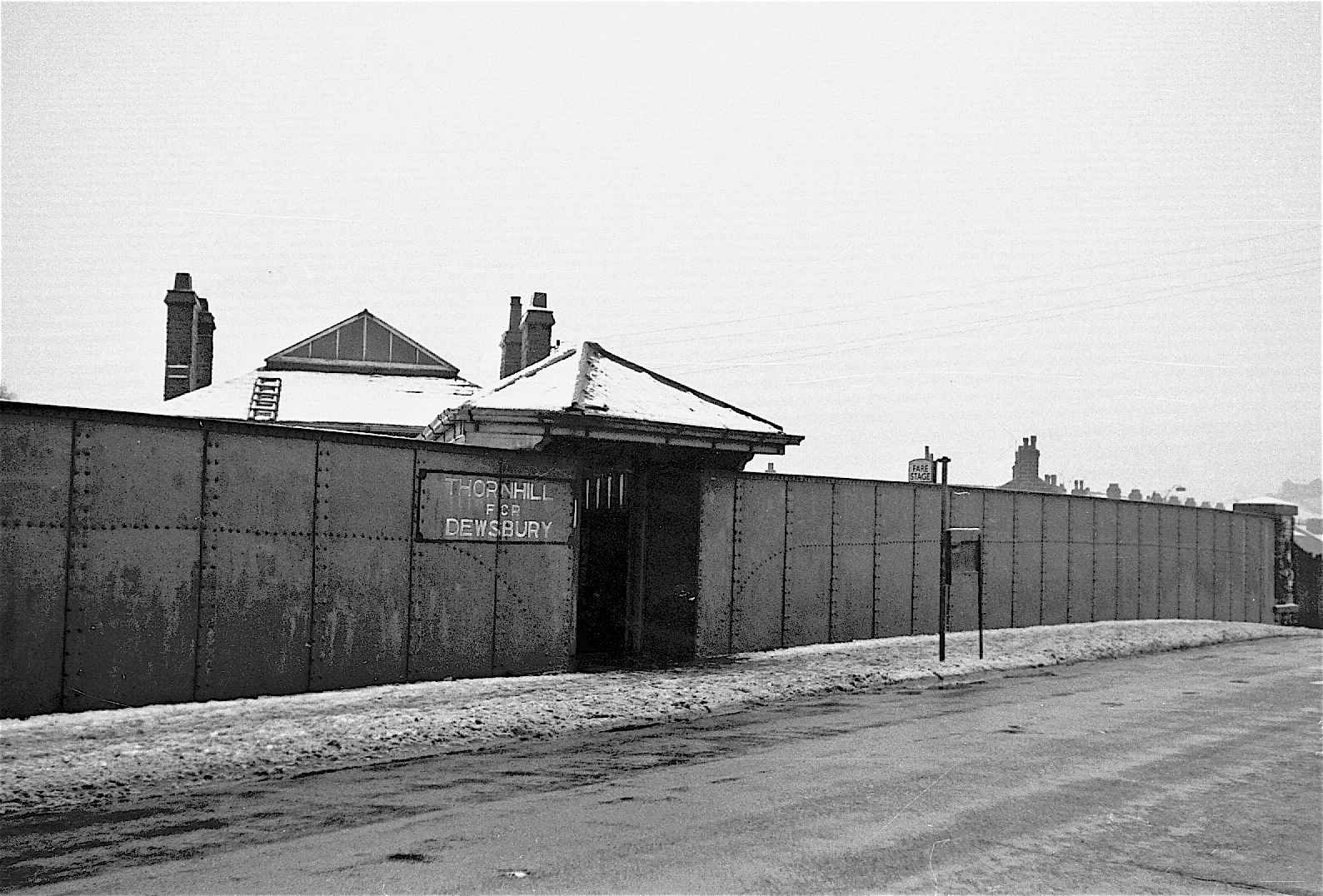
Station Road entrance.

The station was the first to arrive in the town, being built by the Manchester and Leeds Railway and opened in 1840. It was built on the main line and had the status of such, not least because of its substantial adjacent goods-handling facility, but within ten years of having been built, its importance was somewhat reduced by the arrival of town centre competition. Its lower volume of business naturally contributed to its lower status generally. It was often confused with other Dewsbury stations, or entirely disregarded. It closed just three years prior to Beeching's closure of Dewsbury central, on the last day of 1961.

Its impressive passenger station was located in what is better known today as Thornhill Lees, on the surviving main line. The original access is still there, albeit with a steel barrier bolted in place, on station road level, between the two bridges, on the east side of the road.

There is on official record, a possible interest in re-opening this facility in the future.

== Route ==
Preceding station	Historical railways	Following station
Mirfield	Lancashire and Yorkshire Railway; Huddersfield Line	Horbury and Ossett
Mirfield	Lancashire and Yorkshire Railway; Dewsbury Branch Line	Dewsbury Market Place
