= Listed buildings in Cleckheaton =

Cleckheaton is a town and an unparished area in the metropolitan borough of Kirklees, West Yorkshire, England. Cleckheaton ward contains 31 listed buildings that are recorded in the National Heritage List for England. Of these, one is listed at Grade II*, the middle of the three grades, and the others are at Grade II, the lowest grade. In addition to the town of Cleckheaton, the ward contains the smaller settlements of Hightown, Hunsworth, Oakenshaw, and Scholes. The listed buildings include houses and cottages, farmhouses and farm buildings, churches, chapels and associated structures, public houses, a market cross, a warehouse, a bank, a town hall, a library, a viaduct, a former post office, and a war memorial.

== Key ==
Grade	Criteria
II*	Particularly important buildings of more than special interest
II	Buildings of national importance and special interest

== Buildings ==
Name and location	Photograph	Date	Notes	Grade
414 and 414A Whitechapel Road, Scholes; 53.73044°N 1.74672°W	—	Late 15th or early 16th century	A barn converted into two houses in 1989, it has a timber framed core clad in stone, and a stone slate roof. The gabled front faces the road, there are three bays, and a continuous outshut along the entrance front. The building contains doorways, and mullioned and single-light windows.	II
406 and 408 Whitechapel Road and Barn Cottage, Scholes; 53.73054°N 1.74646°W	—	1631	A row of houses and a converted barn, in stone with a stone slate roof and two storeys. There are two doorways, one dated 1631, and the other with a moulded arched lintel dated 1638. The windows are mullioned, with some mullions removed.	II
Barn, Hunsworth Lodge; 53.74157°N 1.70818°W	—	17th century or earlier	The barn has a timber framed core, it was later encased in stone, and has a stone slate roof. There are five bays and an outshut, and the barn contains an elliptical-arched doorway.	II
Lower Blacup Farmhouse, 2 and 3 Quaker Lane; 53.71934°N 1.72060°W	—	17th century (probable)	A group of farmhouses in two blocks at right angles, the later block dating from the 18th century. They are in stone with quoins, and have stone slate roofs with coped gables and cut kneelers, and two storeys. The windows are chamfered, most are mullioned and there is one sash window.	II
Westroyd Farmhouse; 53.74054°N 1.71549°W	—	17th century	A stone house on a plinth, that has a stone slate roof with chamfered copings on the right. There are two storeys, a main range, and a gabled cross-wing on the left with a buttress between. The doorway has a chamfered surround and a triangular lintel with a datestone above. Most of the windows are mullioned with hood moulds, and there is a twelve-light mullioned and transomed window in the ground floor.	II
4 and 5 Mazebrook; 53.73712°N 1.70790°W	—	1654	A large farmhouse in stone with quoins, and a stone slate roof with coped gables on cut kneelers. There are two storeys, and an L-shaped plan, with a wing and outshut to the rear. The doorway has an initialled and dated lintel with a cambered arch. There is a round-headed fire window, and the other windows are mullioned. Over the ground floor openings is a continuous hood mould.	II
Lands Farmhouse; 53.73312°N 1.70657°W	—	1693	A house with a cottage recessed to the left and a rear outshut. The building is in rendered stone, with a tile roof and two storeys. The house has a central doorway with a deep inscribed and dated lintel, and mullioned windows with some mullions removed. The cottage has a porch and at the rear is a round-headed fire window.	II
Egypt; 53.73157°N 1.70679°W	—	17th or early 18th century	A house, later divided, in stone, partly rendered, with quoins, a string course, and a stone slate roof with chamfered gable copings and moulded kneelers. There are two storeys, three bays, and a rear outshut. Near the centre is a doorway with a chamfered surround and an arched lintel. The windows are double chamfered and mullioned with most mullions removed.	II
Savile Arms Public House; 53.73981°N 1.71529°W		Early 18th century	The public house is in stone, with quoins, a stone slate roof, and two storeys. The near-central doorway has a chamfered surround and a hood mould, and the windows are mullioned, with four and five lights in the ground floor.	II
Oldfield Nook; 53.72267°N 1.74582°W	—	1739 (presumed)	The house, which was altered and extended in the 19th century, is in stone and has an irregular plan. The windows are mullioned, with up to seven lights, and the later windows also have transoms.	II
The Cross, Oakenshaw; 53.74619°N 1.73838°W		Late 18th century	A market cross in stone, consisting of a slender column with four colonnettes, and standing on a podium of four circular steps. On the top is an elaborate finial with a sundial on each face.	II
Warehouse; 53.72379°N 1.71144°W	—	c. 1800	The warehouse and former textile building are in sandstone with a stone slate roof. There are three storeys and four bays, and a two-storey projection to the east under a catslide roof. The doors have jambs with tie-stones, the windows are mullioned, and there are three taking-in doors with a crane above.	II
Barn west of the Old Vicarage; 53.73050°N 1.74858°W	—	Late 18th or early 19th century	A stone barn with quoins, an eaves band, and a stone slate roof with coped gables and moulded kneelers. On each side is an elliptically headed cart entry with a keystone and an impost block, and smaller doorways. There are blocked ventilation slits on each face.	II
Wellands Farm; 53.72200°N 1.73194°W	—	Late 18th or early 19th century	A stone farmhouse with rusticated quoins, sill bands, and a stone slate roof with coped gables. There are two storeys, and a symmetrical front of three bays. The central doorway has a small cornice, above it is a single-light window, at the rear is a staircase window, and the other windows are mullioned.	II
Whitechapel Church, Cleckheaton; 53.72874°N 1.72974°W		1821	The church was restored by William Henry Howorth in 1887–88, and altered later. It consists of a nave and a chancel as one unit, and a south porch. At the west end is a corbelled-out polygonal bellcote with a short spire and a finial. The windows are lancets with Y-tracery.	II
1, 2 and 3 Mazebrook; 53.73720°N 1.70764°W	—	Early 19th century	A terrace of three cottages in stone with quoins, and a stone slate roof. There are two storeys and lean-to extensions. The doorways and some windows have been altered, and the other windows are mullioned.	II
St John's Church, Cleckheaton; 53.72463°N 1.70983°W		1830–32	A Commissioners' church designed by Peter Atkinson, (junior), the chancel was added in 1864–65, and the nave was completely rebuilt in 1886–88 by W. Swinden Barber. The church is built in stone with a slate roof, and consists of a nave with a clerestory, north and south aisles, a south porch, a chancel with a vestry, and a west tower. The tower has three stages, buttresses, a south doorway, a blind clock face, and a small parapet on moulded corbel brackets. Most of the window are lancets, and the east window has five lights and a circle in the head.	II
13 Wyke Lane, Oakenshaw; 53.74614°N 1.73737°W	—	Early to mid 19th century	A stone house with a stone slate roof, two storeys and two bays. The doorway is near the centre, and in each floor are two three-light mullioned windows.	II
West House; 53.73816°N 1.69204°W	—	Early to mid 19th century	A large stone house with a band, a moulded eaves cornice and blocking course, rising to form a parapet with three urns, and a hipped slate roof. There are two storeys and a symmetrical front of five bays, the middle three bays projecting, and two recessed two-storey, one-bay wings. Five steps lead up to a central doorway with a semicircular fanlight, an entablature and a pediment, and the windows are sashes.	II
George Hotel; 53.72336°N 1.71271°W		Mid 19th century	The hotel, then a public house, was later extended. It is in stone with quoins in the earlier part, and a stone slate roof. There are two storeys and an L-shaped plan, both parts with a double pile. On the front are three bays, with a central doorway and sash windows. The extension has six bays, and contains a large oculus, and a blocked carriage entrance.	II
Chapel, Cleckheaton Cemetery; 53.72561°N 1.72139°W		1853	The chapel is in stone with a stone slate roof, and is in Classical style. On the front is a Doric tetrastyle portico with a pediment. In the centre is a round-arched double doorway with a archivolt and a keystone, and above are niches. Along the sides are Doric pilasters, round arched windows with archivolts, and a continuous sill band, and at the rear is a lean-to extension.	II
Former Providence Place United Reformed Church, gate piers and gates 53.72745°N 1.71231°W		1857–59	The church, later used for other purposes, was designed by Lockwood and Mawson in Classical style. It is built in stone with a roof of blue slate, it has two storeys and a basement, a five-bay front, and nine bays along the sides. On the front is a portico consisting of vermiculated quoins, a modillioned pediment, six giant unfluted Corinthian columns on a podium, arches with archivolts, and decorated keystones. Above is a vermiculated frieze and consoles carrying the pediment. In the tympanum is an inscribed roundel surrounded by carved foliage. There are three round-arched doorway with vermiculated surrounds and voussoirs. The outer bays are also arched and contain pedestals, and in the upper storey are round-arched windows with pilasters and archivolts. On each side is a bracketed eaves cornice and windows, square-headed in the basement and ground storey and round-arched above. In front of the church are five squat square gate piers, each with a cornice and a square cap, and ornamental cast iron gates.	II*
St Luke's Church, Moorbottom; 53.72244°N 1.72953°W		1887–89	The church, which is in Gothic Revival style, is built in stone with a slate roof. It consists of a nave with a clerestory, north and south aisles, a chancel with a south vestry and organ chamber, and a southwest steeple. The steeple has a tower with three stages, angle buttresses, clock faces, and a hexagonal broach spire with louvred lucarnes. The east window has five lights and a hood mould.	II
St Andrew's Church, Oakenshaw; 53.74609°N 1.73601°W		1888–89	The church is in Early English style, and built in stone with a slate roof. It consists of a nave with a clerestory, a south aisle, a south porch, a chancel, a south vestry, and a northwest tower. The tower has two stages, angle buttresses, clock faces, octagonal pinnacles, an octagonal bell chamber, and a short spire. Most of the windows are lancets.	II
Midland Bank; 53.72512°N 1.71172°W		1890	The bank, later HSBC, was designed by William Henry Howorth, and is on a corner site. It is in stone, with a moulded cornice between the floors, a moulded eaves cornice and blocking course, and a slate roof. There are four bays on Bradford Road, five on Pavement Street, and an angled bay on the corner. There is a doorway in the corner bay and on the two right bays on Pavement Street, each with an inscribed panel above. Between the ground floor windows are pilasters, and the windows in the upper floor have moulded architraves and scrolled pediments. On the roof are three dormers, each with a pediment, carving on the front and in the tympanum of the pediment, and a ball and stalk finial.	II
Town Hall; 53.72486°N 1.71163°W		1890–92	The town hall is in stone with a slate roof, two storeys with attics at the front, and three storeys and basements on the sides. There are two bays in the centre, and flanking projecting gabled wings with ball and spike finials. The right bay has a clock tower, and steps flanked by a wall with ornamental piers, leading up to a round-headed doorway with pilasters and a carved frieze. There are clock faces on three sides, and above are round-arched dormer openings and a copper domed lantern. The left wing has a canted mullioned and transomed oriel window over which is a balcony, and in the gable apex is a cartouche. The right bay has a shaped gable, and in the attic are two round-arched windows with a balcony on large console brackets.	II
St Barnabas' Church, Hightown; 53.71418°N 1.72320°W		1892–93	The church, designed by W. Swinden Barber in Gothic Revival style, is built in stone with a slate roof. It consists of a nave with a clerestory, north and south aisles, a south porch, a south vestry, and a chancel. On the west gable is a bellcote containing two bells with a quatrefoil above. The windows are lancets, and the east window has triple lancets with a hood mould.	II
Cleckheaton Viaduct; 53.72571°N 1.70760°W		c. 1899	The viaduct was built by the London and North Western Railway over the valley of the River Spen to connect the town with its Spen Bank station. It is carried on twelve lattice piers on brick plinths with stone copings. The deck has six barrel vaults between iron beams, and there are coped stone parapets.	II
Old Post Office; 53.72494°N 1.71317°W		1908	The former post office is in stone with a bracketed eaves cornice and a stone slate roof and two storeys. There is a four-bay central range, flanked by slightly projecting wings, the left wider. In the ground floor of the central range are four arched openings, the second a doorway with a dentilled segmental pediment on fluted brackets. The other bays contain windows with hood moulds and keystones, and in the upper floor are paired windows with colonnettes. The left wing contains a doorway with a moulded swept head, an oculus above, and a window to the left with a keystone. Above is another window with a keystone, flanked by small lights, and at the top is an open segmental pediment. The right wing has a window with a keystone in both floors, and an open triangular pediment.	II
War memorial 53.72286°N 1.71241°W		1922	The war memorial by George Frampton is in King Edward VII Memorial Park. It is in Portland stone, and consists of square base with a square column inscribed on two sides and with scrolls on the other sides. On the top are segmental pediments, and a sculpture of seated male and female figures carrying shields with lowered flags. Surrounding the memorial are octagonal walls with copper plaques inscribed with the names of those lost in the First World War.	II
Cleckheaton Library; 53.72612°N 1.72223°W		1929–30	The public library, which was extended in 1973, is in stone on a chamfered plinth, with a moulded eaves band, a coped parapet, and a slate roof. There is a single storey and a front of nine bays. The middle three bays form a projecting portico with Doric columns, and an entablature with a parapet and a central panel. The outer bays contain cross casement windows. Above the central space is a glazed dome.	II
