= Cleckheaton bus station =

Bus station in Cleckheaton, West Yorkshire, England

Cleckheaton
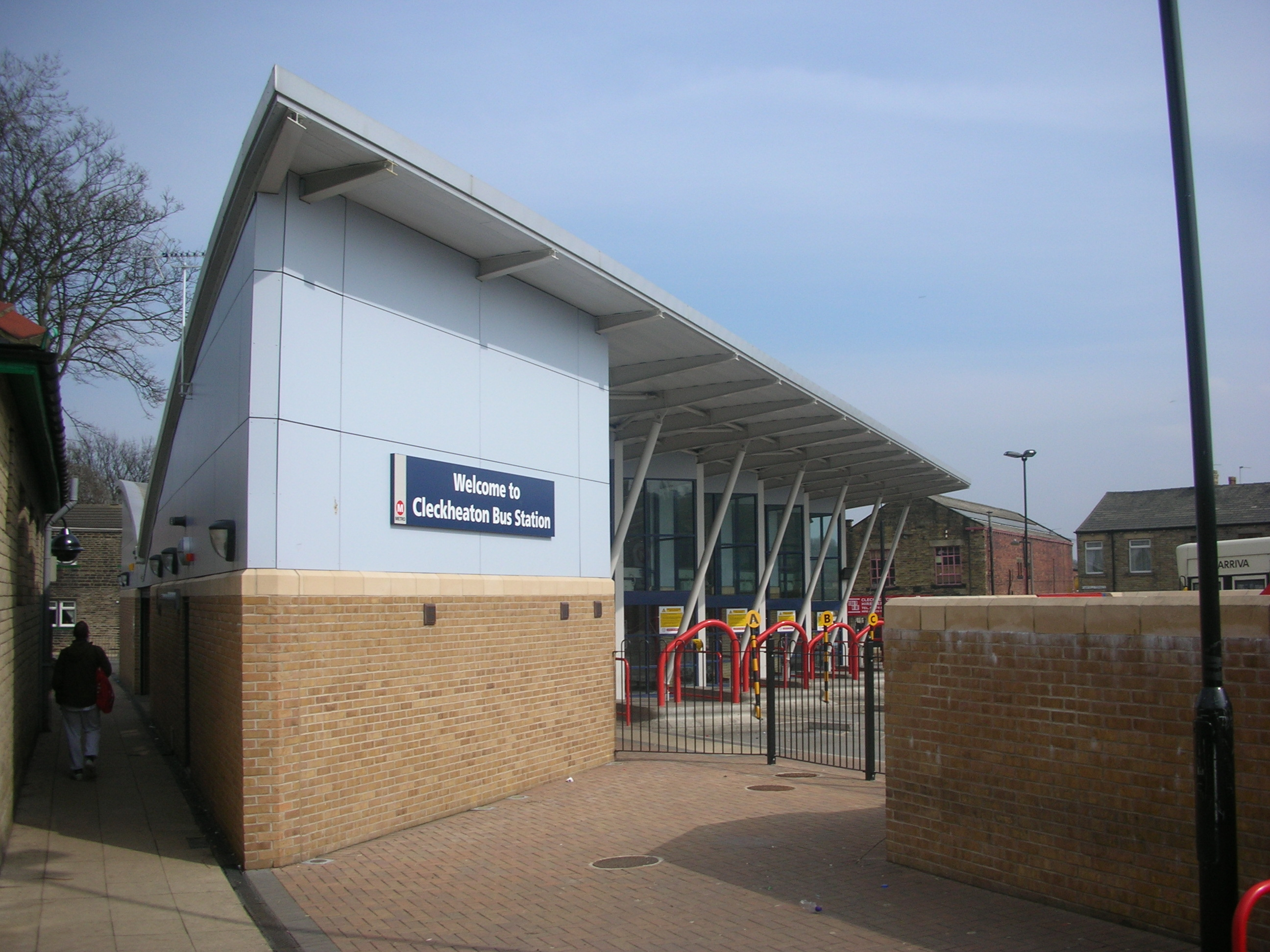
- Cleckheaton bus station in March 2006

General information
- Location: Dewsbury Road, Cleckheaton; Kirklees
- Coordinates: 53.722°N 1.712°W
- Owner: West Yorkshire Metro
- Operator: West Yorkshire Metro
- Bus routes: 10 (July 2021)
- Bus stands: 6
- Bus operators: Arriva Yorkshire; First West Yorkshire; TLC Travel

Other information
- Website: www.wymetro.com

History
- Opened: 24 April 2005
Location

Cleckheaton bus station serves the town of Cleckheaton, West Yorkshire, England. The station is owned and maintained by West Yorkshire Metro. It is situated in the town centre with entrances from Dewsbury Road and Greenside. It was rebuilt in April 2005 replacing the previous Arriva Yorkshire owned site.

== History ==
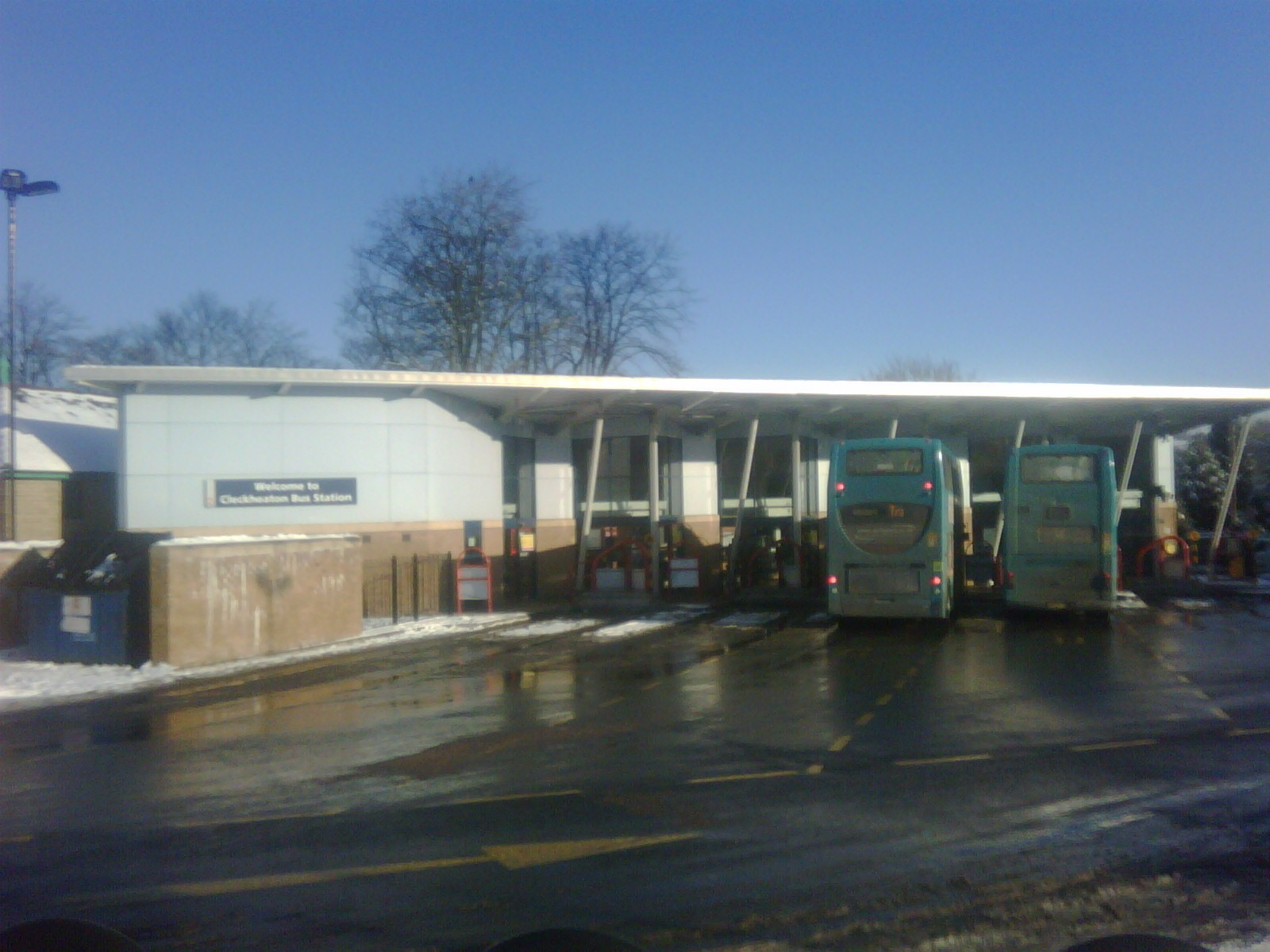
Cleckheaton bus station stands in January 2010

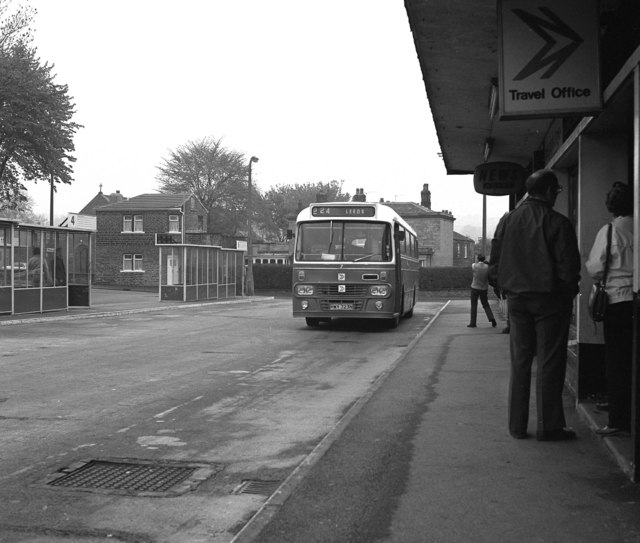
The earlier station in May 1983

The previous station was built in 1959 for the Yorkshire Woollen District Transport Company. This cost £22,000 and had 12 stands on four platforms. It closed in July 2004.

The bus station opened on 24 April 2005. In 2010, the closure of the bus station was proposed by West Yorkshire Metro in an attempt to reduce costs. However, in February 2011, it was announced that the bus station would remain open.

In 2013, West Yorkshire Metro began playing classical music at the bus station in an attempt to improve its atmosphere.

In July 2021, Tracy Brabin, the mayor of West Yorkshire, made facemasks mandatory on West Yorkshire's bus stations, including Cleckheaton.

Planning approval has been sought to replace retail space at the station with an online pharmacy and consultation room and to add window-mounted advertising panels.

In 2021, an estate broker advertised that the station was under offer, although it was unclear whether this meant for sale or for rent.

== Facilities ==
There are six stands at the bus station with a real-time information board. The main operator at the bus station is Arriva Yorkshire. In line with all other recently built West Yorkshire Metro bus stations, the passenger waiting area is fully enclosed. The bus station contains a shop.

== Services ==
Arriva Yorkshire, First West Yorkshire and TLC Travel run services around the Heavy Woollen District and as far as Dewsbury, Huddersfield, Halifax, Bradford, Leeds and Wakefield.

== Incidents ==
In June 2009, a man was injured when he mistakenly drove his car into the bus station. The following year, the bus station was targeted by thieves, who crashed their car into the bus station.
