= Spen Valley =

Spen Valley may refer to:

- River Spen, in West Yorkshire, England
- Spen Valley (UK Parliament constituency) (1885–1950 and 2024–)
- Spen Valley Line, a railway connecting Bradford with Mirfield via the Spen Valley
