= Providence Place United Reformed Church, Cleckheaton =

Providence Place United Reformed Church
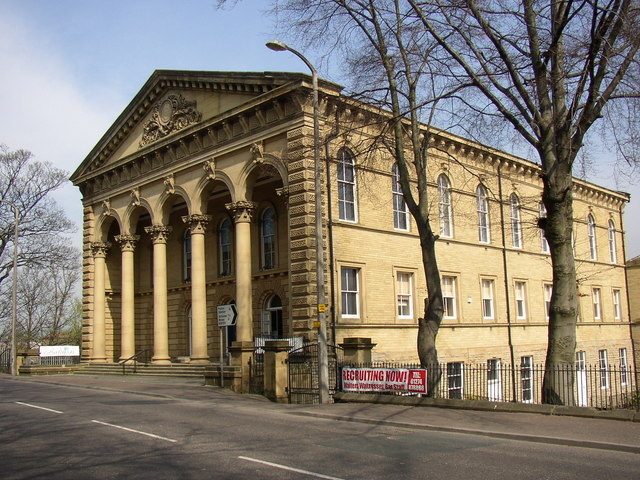
- The building in 2007
- Interactive map of the Providence Place United Reformed Church area
- Alternative names: Providence Place Congregational Church

General information
- Status: Commercial reuse
- Type: Church
- Architectural style: Classical
- Location: Bradford Road, Cleckheaton, England
- Coordinates: 53.7274°N 1.71231°W
- Current tenants: The Monal (wedding venue)
- Groundbreaking: 1857
- Opened: 1859

Technical details
- Floor count: Two, plus basement

Design and construction
- Architects: Henry Francis Lockwood and William Mawson
- Designations: Grade II* listed

The former Providence Place United Reformed Church, also known as Providence Place Congregational Church, is a Victorian church building in Cleckheaton, West Yorkshire, England, completed in 1859 to Classical designs by Lockwood and Mawson. It is now used as a wedding venue, having previously been used as an Indian restaurant. The building is Grade II* listed.

== History ==
Dissenting services were held in Cleckheaton as early as the 1660s. A Presbyterian chapel was built in Scott Yard in the first decade of the 18th century. Its services became Congregational in the 1770s. The current building was constructed alongside this, from 1857 to 1859, and enlarged in 1886. It could accommodate up to 3,000 people. A Sunday school was held in the basement.

The church closed in 1991; its congregation joined Grove United Reformed Church at Gomersal and the church's war memorial, commemorating the fallen of World War I, was relocated there.

The church's records are held by the West Yorkshire Archive Service. (Note: Reference numbers KC949, KC1007)

== Architecture ==
The church was designed by Bradford architects Henry Francis Lockwood and William Mawson in Classical style. It is built in stone with a roof of blue slate, and has two storeys and a basement, a five-bay front, and nine bays along the sides. On the front is a portico consisting of vermiculated quoins, a modillioned pediment, six giant unfluted Corinthian columns on a podium, arches with archivolts, and decorated keystones. Above is a vermiculated frieze and consoles carrying the pediment. In the tympanum is an inscribed roundel surrounded by carved foliage. There are three round-arched doorway with vermiculated surrounds and voussoirs. The outer bays are also arched and contain pedestals, and in the upper storey are round-arched windows with pilasters and archivolts. On each side is a bracketed eaves cornice and windows, square-headed in the basement and ground storey and round-arched above. In front of the church are five squat square gate piers, each with a cornice and a square cap, and ornamental cast iron gates.

The building was Grade II* listed, the second-highest possible category, in April 1982, giving it legal protection from unauthorised alteration or demolition. The gate piers and gates were included in the designation.

== Other uses ==
After it ceased to be used as a church, the building was included by English Heritage on their Buildings at Risk Register. It was restored and converted for use as restaurant in 2000–2001, and housed an Indian restaurant, "Aakash" (meaning "sky" in Urdu). Seating 800, this was said to be one of the largest in the UK. That closed in November 2022 after the building and its adjacent car park were sold at auction in the previous month. As of 2025, it is a wedding venue, "The Monal".

== Incident ==
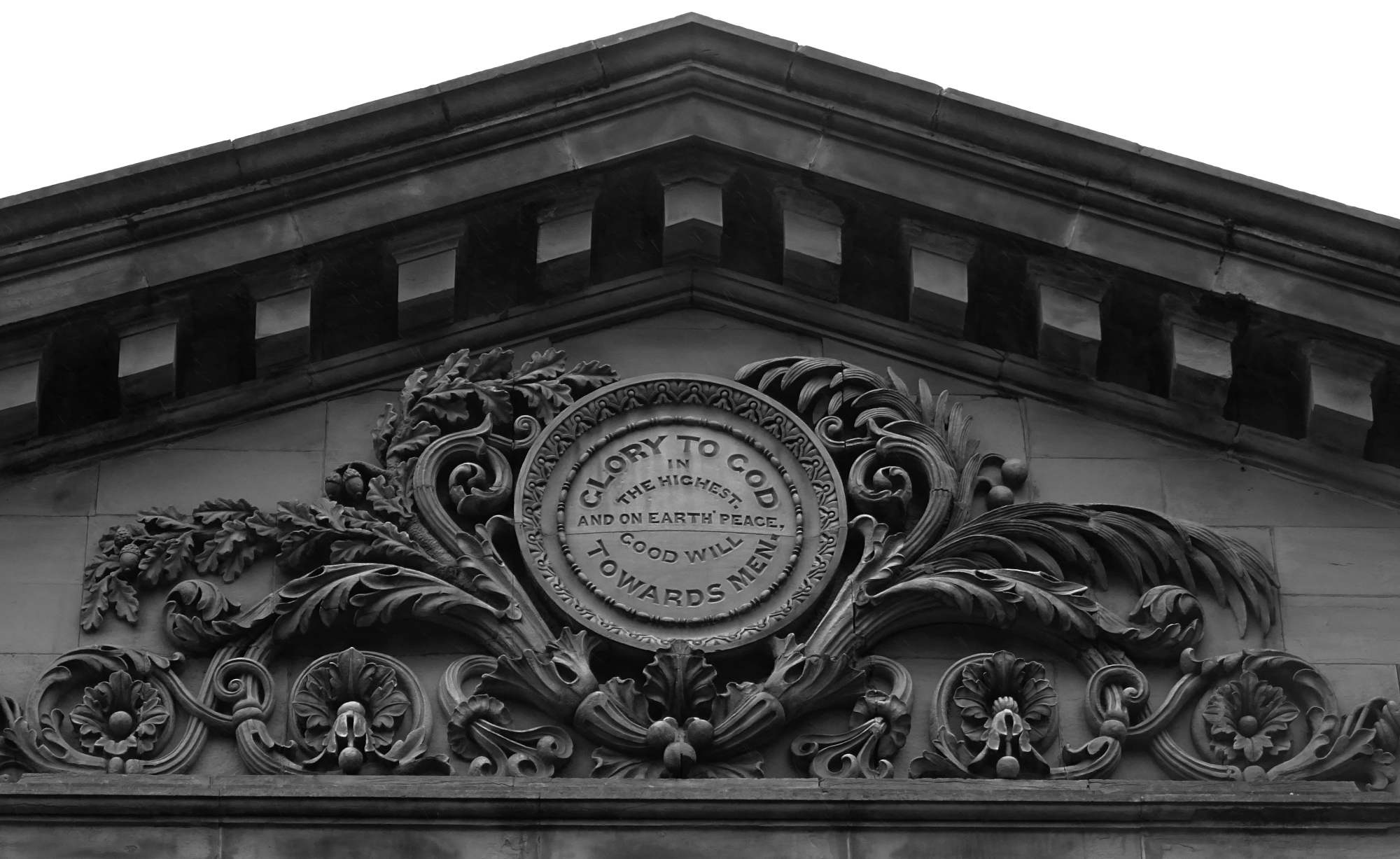
Pediment, seen in 2016

On 6 September 2025, part of the building collapsed onto the street below. No-one was injured. Pictures on news sites showed rubble in the road, and part of the pediment missing.
