= Oakenshaw, West Yorkshire =

Village in West Yorkshire, England

Coordinates: 53.746330°N 1.736846°W

Oakenshaw
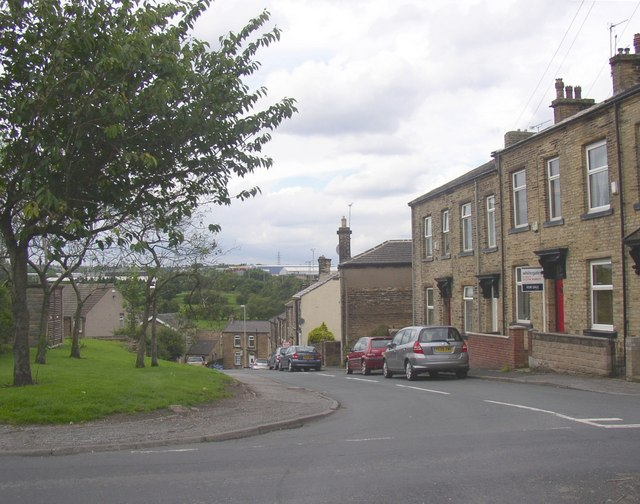
- Cross Street, Oakenshaw (2007)

- Location within West Yorkshire
- OS grid reference: SE174278
  - London: 169.33 mi (272.51 km)
- Metropolitan borough: City of Bradford
- District: Kirklees
- Metropolitan county: West Yorkshire
- Region: Yorkshire and the Humber
- Country: England
- Sovereign state: United Kingdom
- Post town: BRADFORD
- Postcode district: BD12
- Dialling code: 01274
- Police: West Yorkshire
- Fire: West Yorkshire
- Ambulance: Yorkshire
- UK Parliament: Spen Valley
- Website: kirklees.gov.uk

Oakenshaw is a village located in both the City of Bradford and Kirklees in West Yorkshire, England. It is located midway between the town of Cleckheaton in Kirklees and the suburb of Wyke in Bradford. The village is close to the M606 motorway. The village's main shopping centre is on Bradford Road and its main church, dedicated to St Andrew, is a grade II listed building.

== Transport ==
The village is served by Low Moor railway station on the Calder Valley line with services to Leeds, Bradford Interchange and Manchester Victoria. Another line serving the village was the Spen Valley Line which ran from Low Moor to Mirfield via Cleckheaton and Heckmondwike. Another branch of the line connected to Dewsbury but this line closed in 1965 to all traffic. It is now the Spen Valley Greenway.

=== Gallery ===
Images of Oakenshaw

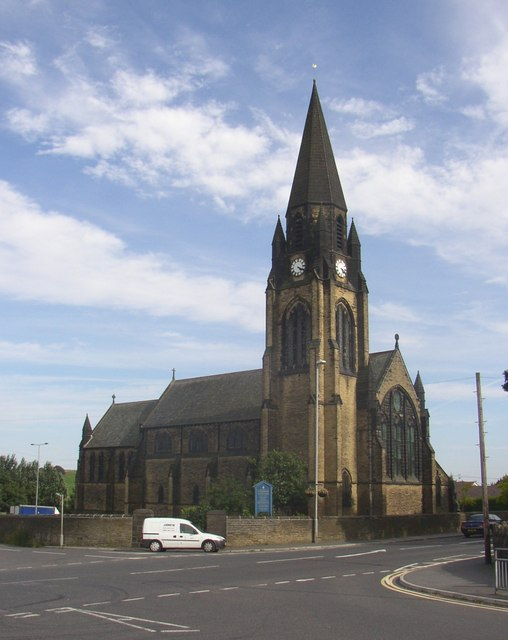
St Andrew's Church, Grade-II listed building (2007).

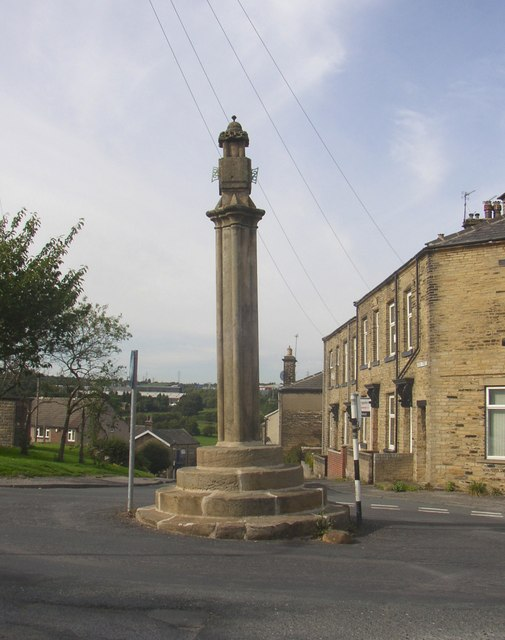
The Oakenshaw Cross (2007).

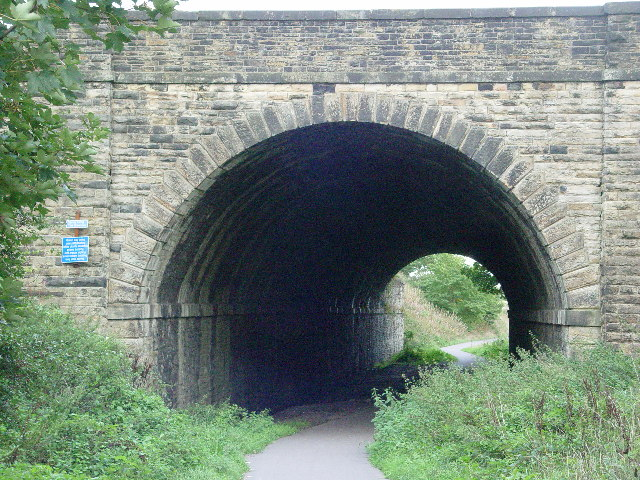
Old disused railway tunnel on the Spen Valley Greenway between Low Moor and Mirfield (2005).

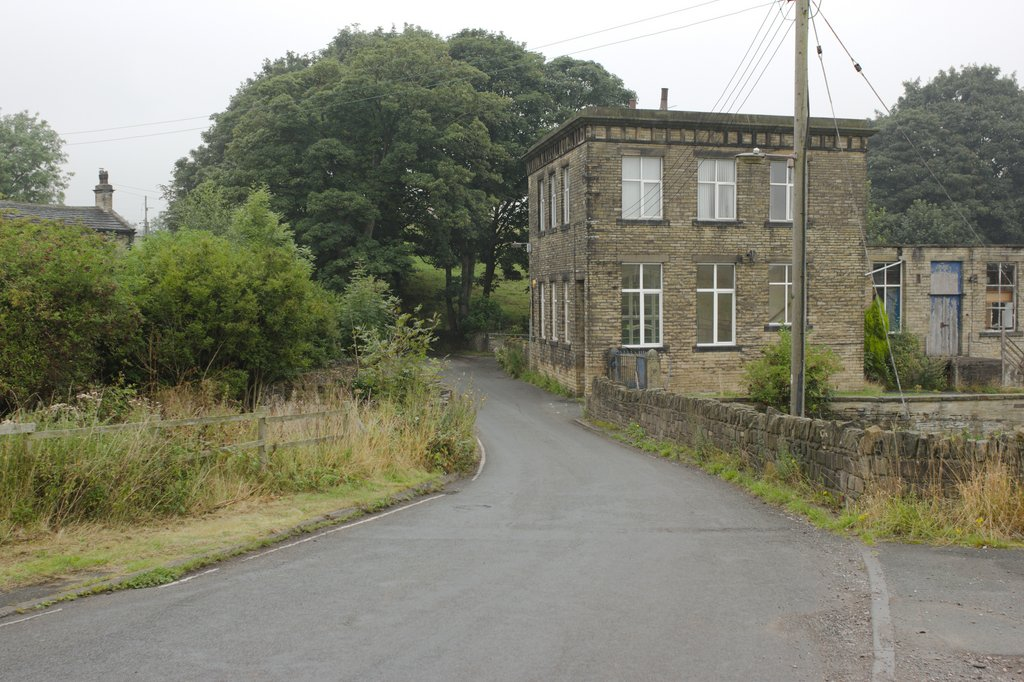
Old Waterworks, Oakenshaw (2016).

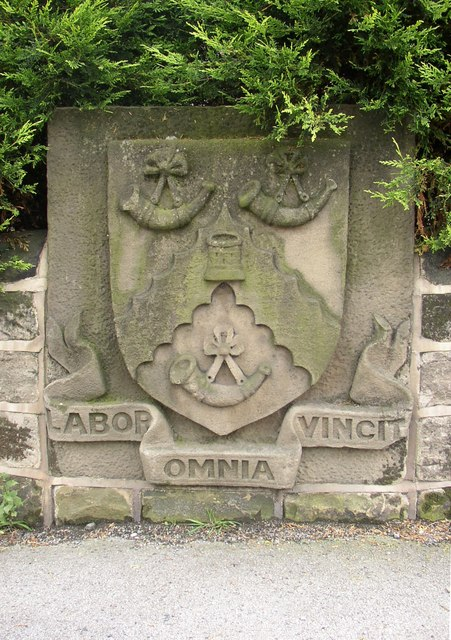
Arms of Bradford, Wyke Lane (2011).

== Sport and leisure ==
=== Cricket ===
Woodlands Cricket Club, established in 1894, is an amateur cricket club based on Albert Terrace. They have two Senior XI teams in the Bradford Premier League and an established junior section that play competitave cricket in the Bradford Junior Cricket League.

== See also ==
- Listed buildings in Cleckheaton
- Listed buildings in Wyke
