= Hightown, West Yorkshire =

Hamlet in West Yorkshire, England

Coordinates: 53.710°N 1.723°W

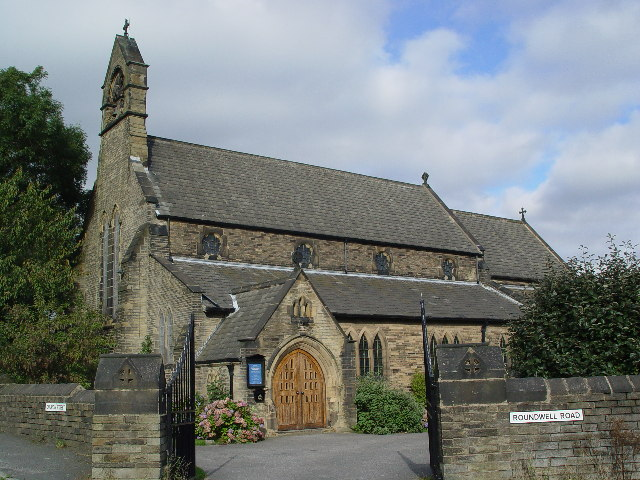
Parish Church of Hightown

Hightown is a village within the parish of Liversedge, West Yorkshire, England, with a diverse socioeconomic culture. Historically part of the West Riding of Yorkshire, to the north, neighbouring the border with Calderdale, is the Windybank council estate. To the east is Hightown Road, where some houses are valued at over one million pounds, and to the south bordering Mirfield and Roberttown is a very middle class private housing estate.

Nearby towns include Cleckheaton, Heckmondwike, and Gomersal, as well as the cities of Bradford and Leeds.

The most notable residents of Hightown were the Brontë family, who lived here before they moved to Haworth.

== See also ==
- Listed buildings in Cleckheaton
