= Cleckheaton =

Town in West Yorkshire, England

Coordinates: 53.725°N 1.719°W

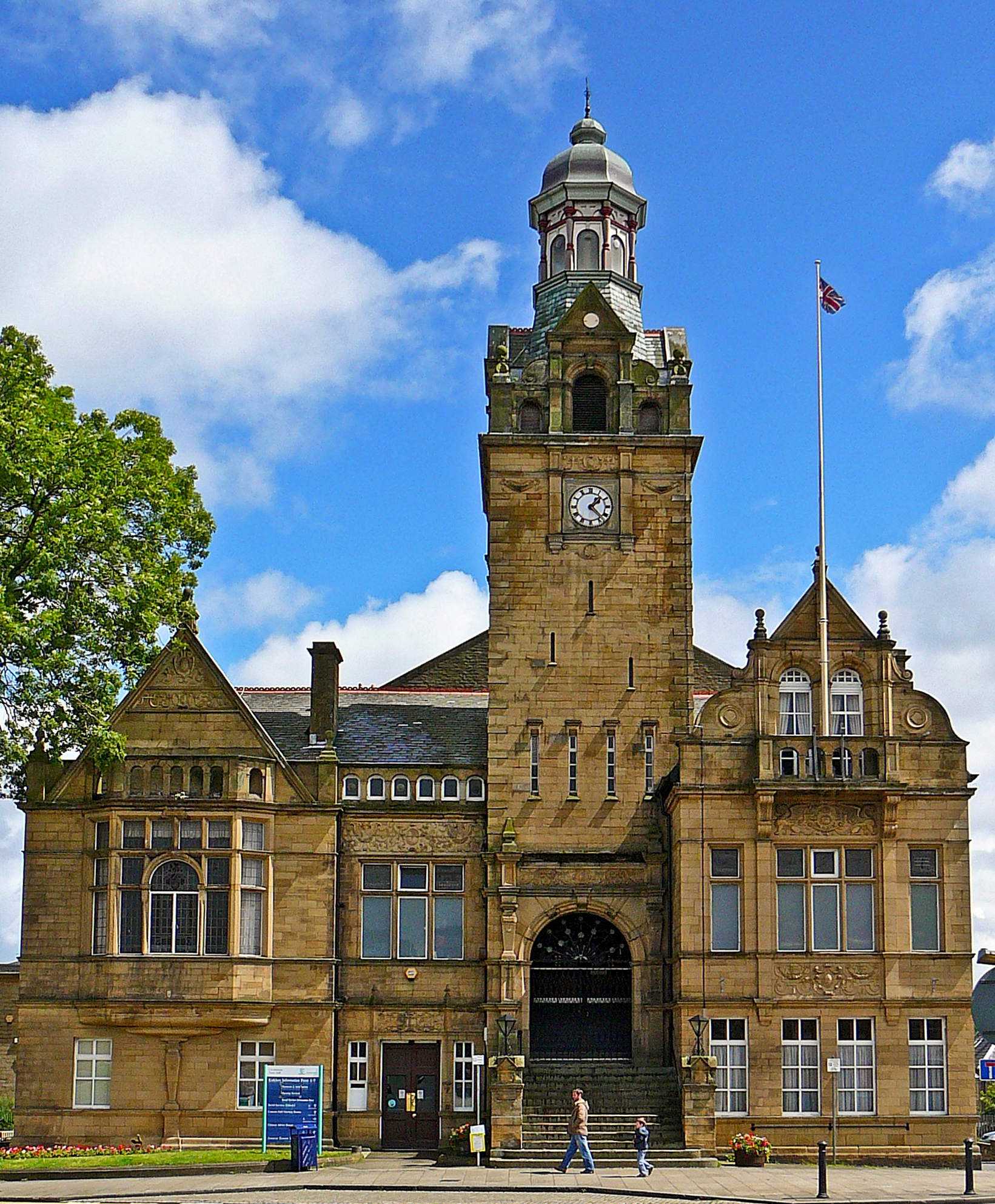
- Cleckheaton Town Hall

- Location within West Yorkshire
- Population: 16,622 (Ward, 2011 census)
- OS grid reference: SE185256
- Metropolitan borough: Kirklees
- Metropolitan county: West Yorkshire
- Region: Yorkshire and the Humber
- Country: England
- Sovereign state: United Kingdom
- Post town: CLECKHEATON
- Postcode district: BD19
- Dialling code: 01274
- Police: West Yorkshire
- Fire: West Yorkshire
- Ambulance: Yorkshire
- UK Parliament: Spen Valley

Church of St John The Evangelist

Cleckheaton is a town in the metropolitan borough of Kirklees, West Yorkshire, England. Historically part of the West Riding of Yorkshire, it is situated south of Bradford, east of Brighouse, west of Batley and south-west of Leeds. It is at the centre of the Spen Valley and was the major town in the former borough of Spenborough. Cleckheaton has a history as a mill town and forms part of the Heavy Woollen District.

== History ==
=== Early history ===
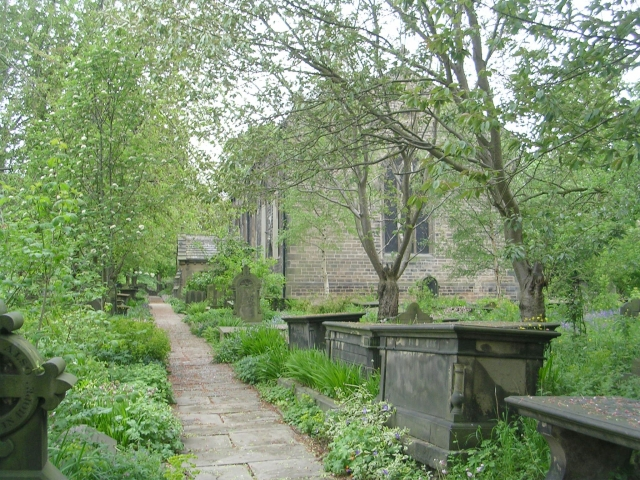
Whitechapel Church

The Spen Valley was once heavily wooded. Evidence of human habitation in Mesolithic and Neolithic times has been found in the area. Roman remains have been found in the valley and it is thought that roads from York to Chester, and from settlements in Halifax and Wakefield, passed through Cleckheaton.

The name Cleckheaton derives from the Old English hēahtūn meaning 'high settlement'. The Old Norse word klakkr meaning 'lump/hill' was added to the name later on.

Cleckheaton was in the ancient parish of Birstall. A chapel of ease, known as the White Chapel (later Whitechapel) was established.

=== Textile working ===
The area was very disorganised for a long time after the Norman Conquest and the richest townships at that time were still the richest 300 years later as the Poll Tax returns of 1379 show. They also demonstrate the lack of administration as only the richest four of the 227 families living in the Spen Valley were made to pay more than the 4d (approx. 2p) minimum tax. These tax returns also show the recent deviation from the traditional sources of wealth in the area (i.e. farming and allied trades). These were centred on textiles and included dyeing, weaving and fulling (common names in the area nowadays still recall these early trades: Lister- dyer, Webster- weaver, Walker- fuller).

After the Reformation, Kirklees Priory was largely destroyed, many families were driven from the area and new non-aristocratic lords of the manor who were sympathetic to Protestantism were introduced by Elizabeth I, as was a puritan clergyman who was installed at Birstall Church. By 1570, at the time of the Rising of the Northern Earls, the last of the old Norman noble families had been swept away. Sir John Neville went into exile and forfeited his estate and Thomas Hussey (heir to the de Tilly family of Oakwell Hall) was imprisoned in the Tower of London for some time before being pardoned.

By the 17th century land-owning farmers were finding it increasingly difficult as were their landlords and some payments were still in kind as farmers had no money to pay their debts. Meanwhile, the textile workers were becoming more and more prosperous and paid less and less attention to their hard up and increasingly impotent landlords. During the English Civil War the clothiers were on one side and the landlords on the other. Lords of the area were made Royalist officers and made some progress such as at the Battle of Adwalton Moor about a mile east of Birkenshaw and the siege of Bradford, before the Parliamentarians took control of the area.

=== Nonconformity ===
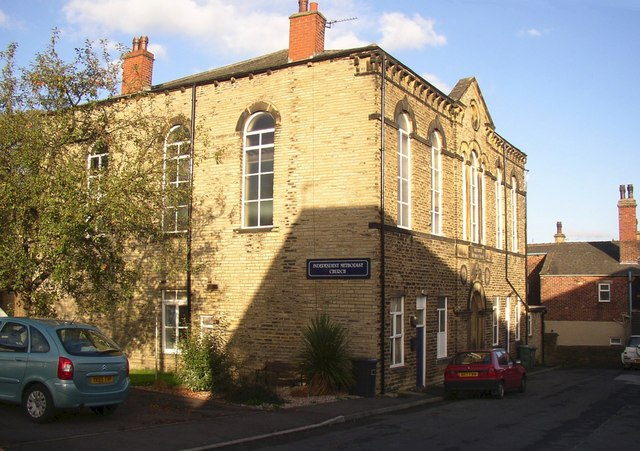
Independent Methodist Chapel, Chapel Street

After the restoration of the monarchy in 1660, Anglicanism was reintroduced. However, many people had found Puritan teachings more to their taste, and it took many years to re-install an Anglican vicar to Whitechapel. Despite the draconian nonconformist laws, there were many nonconformist meeting houses and nonconformity flourished; a fifth of the population of the Birstall Parish was estimated to be nonconformist. Quakers were widespread, and even now a number of 17th and 18th century Quaker burial grounds remain in the area. In the 18th century, Presbyterianism was widespread, but then it lost a large minority of its flock to Unitarianism and to the Baptist church. Methodism also flourished from the 1740s after visits from John Wesley and Charles Wesley, as did the Moravian Church. Indeed, John Wesley visited Birstall some 40 times.

In spite of the religious strength in the valley, the inhabitants were somewhat unconventional and still went to astrologers, quack doctors and prophets. Local religious leaders included people like Eli Collins, the "Wizard of Wyke", and Alvery Newsome, the "Wise Man of Heckmondwike".

=== Industrial Revolution ===
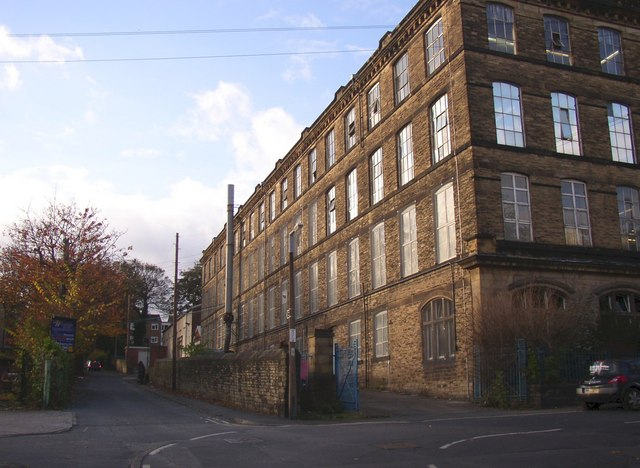
Prospect Mills in Prospect Road

In 1804 the Reverend Hammond Roberson, annoyed that the administration of Liversedge was disorganised, promoted a system of reform (the select vestry) which quickly spread to Cleckheaton and Heckmondwike. In 1810, after his wife's death, Roberson turned his attention to church building in the area. In 1818 Parliament voted £1 million for the building of new churches in the country, and Roberson was able to secure funding to build Cleckheaton Church: St John the Evangelist in Church Street.

=== Spen Valley ===
By the mid 19th century the Spen Valley entered its golden era. In 1800 children were paid starvation wages for putting staples into leather for carding wool, but by 1838 there were eleven carding factories in Cleckheaton and by 1893 the town was recognised as the carding capital of the world.

=== 20th century ===
Around 1900, many large and expensive buildings were erected and became symbols of the area's wealth; massive chapels and a new grammar school were built in Cleckheaton, and to mark the new urban district and the fact that it was the centre of it, Cleckheaton built a town hall in 1892, paid for in part by public subscription.

In 1903, Lion Confectionery began making "Midget Gems" in Cleckheaton, and 1904 saw the opening of the Phelon & Moore (Panther) motorcycle factory in the town, soon followed by a car factory. BBA (formerly British Belting & Asbestos), the large asbestos, friction material, and conveyor belting firm, built its headquarters at Moorend, where they manufactured automotive disc brake pads under the Mintex banner. A tourist industry developed to serve visitors to the area aware of its connection to Charlotte Brontë's novel Shirley and Luddite attacks. The philanthropic Mowatt family paid for Cleckheaton Library.

==== Cleckheaton railway station ====
The railway station closed to passenger traffic in 1965 and to goods four years later. In 1972, a singular case was heard at Wakefield Crown Court. A Dewsbury man was accused of, as counsel for the prosecution put it, effectively stealing the station. British Rail had contracted for the clearing of the site; part of the deal was that the contractors would sell and retain the proceeds from disposal of the materials and scrap. On arrival, they discovered that the station and most of the material were already gone. It transpired that the defendant had been contracted by another firm to clear the site, had been advanced a sum for hire of plant, and had spent three weeks clearing the site. Subsequent efforts to trace the second firm failed, and the court found the man not guilty, deciding that he had been duped and left significantly out of pocket.

==== Cleckheaton bus station ====
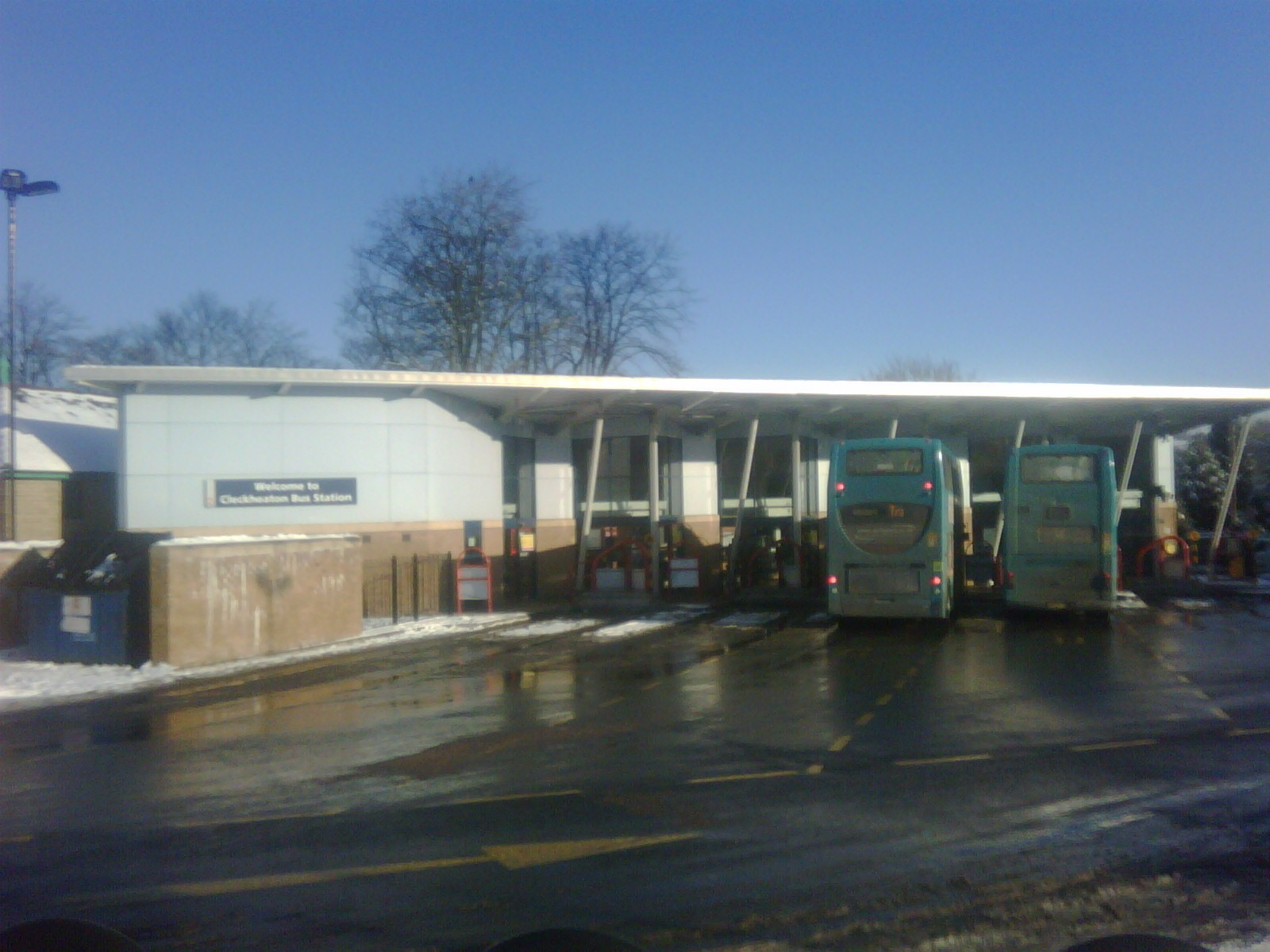
Cleckheaton bus station stands

Cleckheaton has a bus station in the town centre. It has six stands, and the main operator is Arriva Yorkshire. However, there is a regular service to Bradford Interchange with different operators and a school bus also operated here. It is owned and maintained by West Yorkshire Metro, who rebuilt it in April 2005, replacing the previous site owned by Arriva Yorkshire.

== Government ==
=== Local government ===
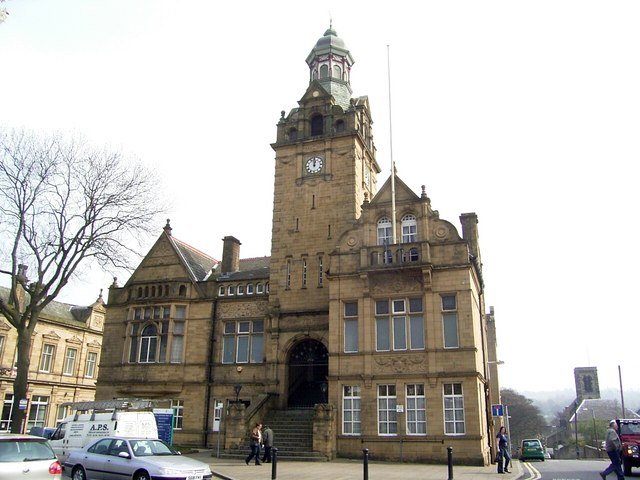
Cleckheaton Town Hall (1892) by Mawson & Hudson of Bradford

Cleckheaton was formerly a township in the parish of Birstall, in 1866 Cleckheaton became a separate civil parish. Cleckheaton adopted the Local Government Act 1858 in 1864 and a local board was formed. The Local Government Act 1894 reconstituted the area of the local board as Cleckheaton Urban District. There were at this time attempts to involve all the local authorities in the valley in joint projects such as installation of sewers and water. In 1915, the three urban districts of Cleckheaton, Liversedge and Gomersal were amalgamated to form Spenborough Urban District. In 1937, a county review order enlarged the urban district to include Birkenshaw, Hunsworth and Hartshead. Spenborough (which included all the Spen Valley except for Heckmondwike) was granted a charter of incorporation and became a municipal borough on 23 May 1955. The borough used the coat of arms which bore the motto "Industry Enriches" which it had been granted in 1949. In 1951 the parish had a population of 13,440. On 1 April 1974 the parish was abolished.

On 1 April 1974, the Local Government Act 1972 reorganised administration throughout England and Wales. The borough of Spenborough was abolished, and its area combined with that of ten other local authorities to form the Metropolitan Borough of Kirklees, one of five metropolitan boroughs of West Yorkshire. Cleckheaton is a ward of Kirklees and is unparished. The population of the ward at the 2011 Census was 16,622. It elects three of the borough council's 69 councillors. In 2007 all three councillors were members of the Liberal Democrats. Under the borough council's decentralisation scheme, Cleckheaton's councillors and those from Heckmondwike and Liversedge and Gomersal form the Spen Valley Area Committee. In August 2014, it was announced that Cleckheaton councillor Kath Pinnock was to be elevated to the House of Lords as a life peer taking the title Baroness Pinnock, of Cleckheaton.

=== Parliamentary representation ===
In 1885, Cleckheaton and the three neighbouring townships, Gomersal, Heckmondwike and Liversedge, were grouped to form the Parliamentary county constituency of Spen Valley and remained in that constituency until 1950. The seat was held at various times by the Liberal, National Liberal and Labour parties. From 1950 to 1983, Cleckheaton was included in the borough constituency of Brighouse and Spenborough. It was a marginal seat, changing hands between the Conservative and Labour parties on six occasions. Cleckheaton was in the Batley and Spen constituency, created in 1983. It was represented by a Conservative Member of Parliament (MP) from 1983 to 1997, then by Labour MP Mike Wood until 2015, when Wood retired and was succeeded by Jo Cox (Labour). After Jo Cox was murdered in 2016, she was replaced in a by-election (which was uncontested by the other major parties) by Tracy Brabin, who retained the seat in 2017 and 2019. When she became Mayor of West Yorkshire in 2021, there was another by-election which was won by Kim Leadbeater, sister of Jo Cox, of the Labour Party. At the time of the 2024 General Election, the Batley and Spen constituency was abolished and in its place a new Spen Valley constituency including Mirfield and Dalton was created. Leadbeater won the seat in 2024 with a majority of 6,000.

== Geography ==
Cleckheaton is at the centre of a number of villages in the Spen Valley: Oakenshaw, East Bierley, Hunsworth, Birkenshaw, Drub, Gomersal, Little Gomersal, Littletown, Millsbridge, Liversedge, Roberttown, Hartshead, Clifton, Hightown, Heckmondwike and Scholes. The town is made up of Moorend, Whitechapel, Whitcliffe, Moorbottom, Moorside, the Marsh and Rawfolds.

Cleckheaton is about four miles north-west of Dewsbury and six miles north-west of Huddersfield. A mile to the north is the M62 motorway accessed at Junction 26, Chain Bar.

Cleckheaton was on a railway line that connected Bradford via Mirfield to Huddersfield. It closed in the 1960s but its trackbed between Low Moor, south of Bradford, and Ravensthorpe, between Dewsbury and Mirfield, is a cycleway known as the Spen Valley Greenway.

== Media ==
Local news and television programmes are provided by BBC Yorkshire and ITV Yorkshire. Television signals are received from the Emley Moor and local relay transmitters.

Cleckheaton local radio stations are BBC Radio Leeds on 92.4 FM, Heart Yorkshire on 102.6 FM, Capital Yorkshire on 105.6 FM, Hits Radio West Yorkshire on 102.5 FM and Greatest Hits Radio West Yorkshire on 96.3 FM.

The local newspapers are the Spenborough Guardian, Dewsbury Reporter and Telegraph & Argus.

== Sports ==
Cleckheaton Sports Club, based at Moorend, is the home of the town's rugby union team, Cleckheaton RUFC., who play in the Regional 1 North East league at the fifth tier of English domestic rugby. The club is also home to Cleckheaton Cricket Club, who play in the Bradford Premier Cricket League Premier Division, the highest level of club cricket in the country. Yorkshire Captain Andrew Gale is a member of Cleckheaton. Also the club, are two bowling greens, home to Cleckheaton Sports Bowls Club, which has hosted the BCGBA Senior Merit "All England" Finals four times. It also hosts lesser annual competitions such as the John Smith's Classic.

Liversedge F.C. are the town's highest football club in the football league pyramid, currently playing in the Northern Premier League Division One East as of the 2021–22 in English football season. They play their home games at the Clayborn Ground, 0.6 miles (1 km) from the town centre.

Other cricket clubs from the local area include Spen Victoria, Gomersal, Hartshead Moor and East Bierley from the Bradford Cricket League, and Scholes and Liversedge from the Central Yorkshire Cricket League.

== Notable people ==
- William Baines (composer/pianist) (1899–1922), lived here from 1913 to 1918, when his father (later replaced by himself) was a cinema pianist at the Picture Palace.
- Wilfred Barber (1901–1968), born Cleckheaton, Yorkshire and England cricketer.
- John Barlow, novelist.
- John Bentley, was Captain of Cleckheaton RUFC (part of Cleckheaton Sports Club).
- Danny Cadamarteri, Huddersfield Town footballer, was born in Cleckheaton in 1979.
- Andrew Gale, captain of Yorkshire Cricket Club, was educated at Whitcliffe Mount School and played for Cleckheaton C.C. (part of Cleckheaton Sports Club).
- Roger Hargreaves, author of the Mr Men and Little Misses series of books, was born in Cleckheaton in 1935.
- Wendy Holden, novelist, attended Whitcliffe Mount School.
- Fred Lord (long-distance runner) (1879–1928), competed at the 1908 Olympics.
- Edward Wadsworth (artist) (1889–1949), "the only son of Fred Wadsworth and Hannah Smith, was born at Cleckheaton, West Yorkshire, on 29th October 1889. His mother, who was an amateur painter, died of puerperal fever soon after giving birth to Edward. His father was a worsted-spinning industrialist who owned the firm E. Wadsworth & Sons."

== See also ==
- Listed buildings in Cleckheaton
- Sugden Audio
- P. & C. Garnett Ltd, 19th-century innovators of metallic carding wire and garnetting.
