= Cleckheaton Town Hall =

Municipal building in Cleckheaton, West Yorkshire, England

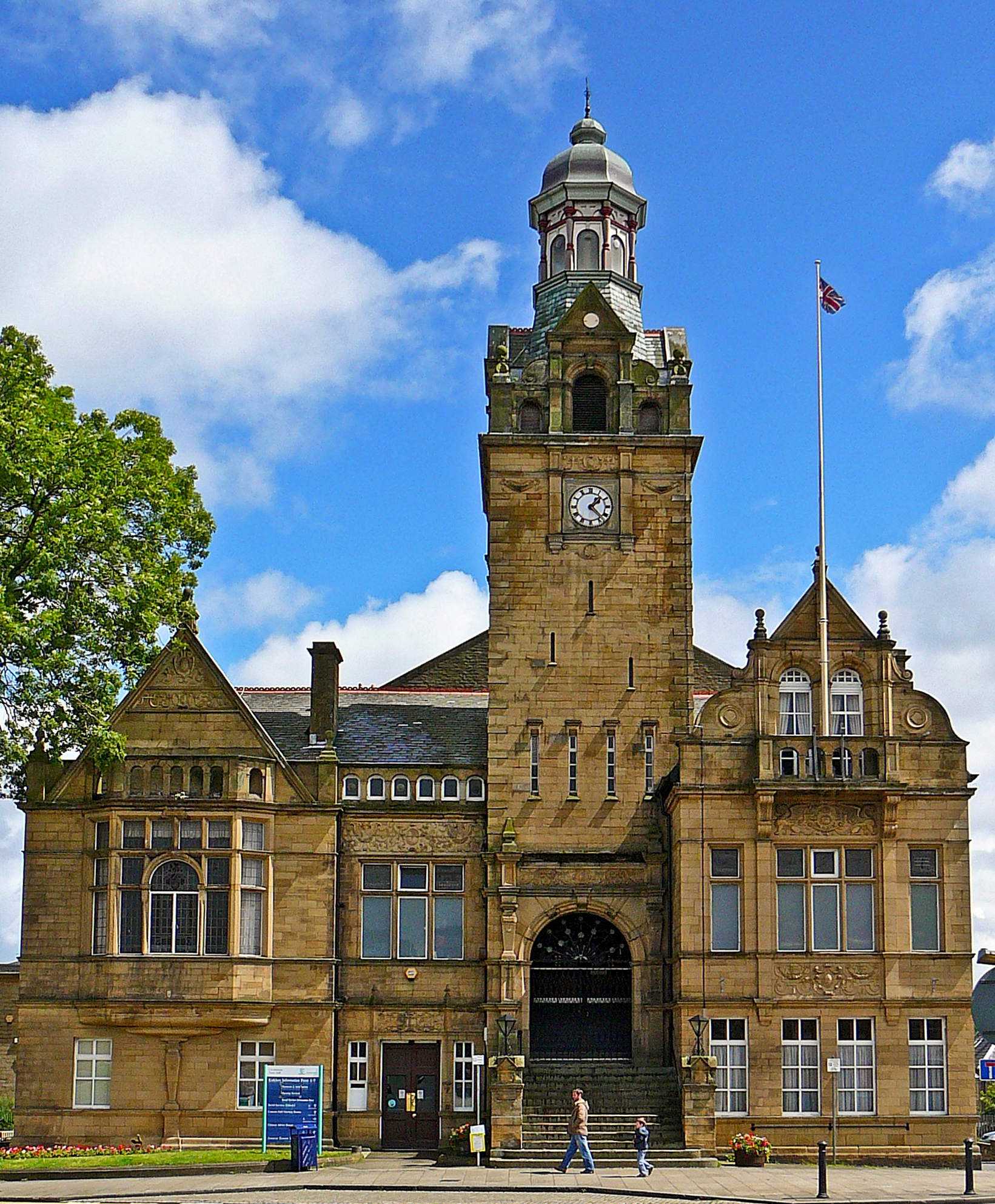
- Cleckheaton Town Hall

- Shown in West Yorkshire
- 53.7248°N 1.7115°W
- Location: Bradford Road, Cleckheaton

History
- Built: 1892

Site notes
- Architect(s): Mawson & Hudson
- Architectural style: Queen Anne style

Listed Building – Grade II
- Official name: Town Hall
- Designated: 11 June 1980
- Reference no.: 1313688

Cleckheaton Town Hall is a municipal building in Bradford Road, Cleckheaton, West Yorkshire, England. The town hall, which was the headquarters of Spenborough Urban District Council, is a Grade II listed building.

== History ==
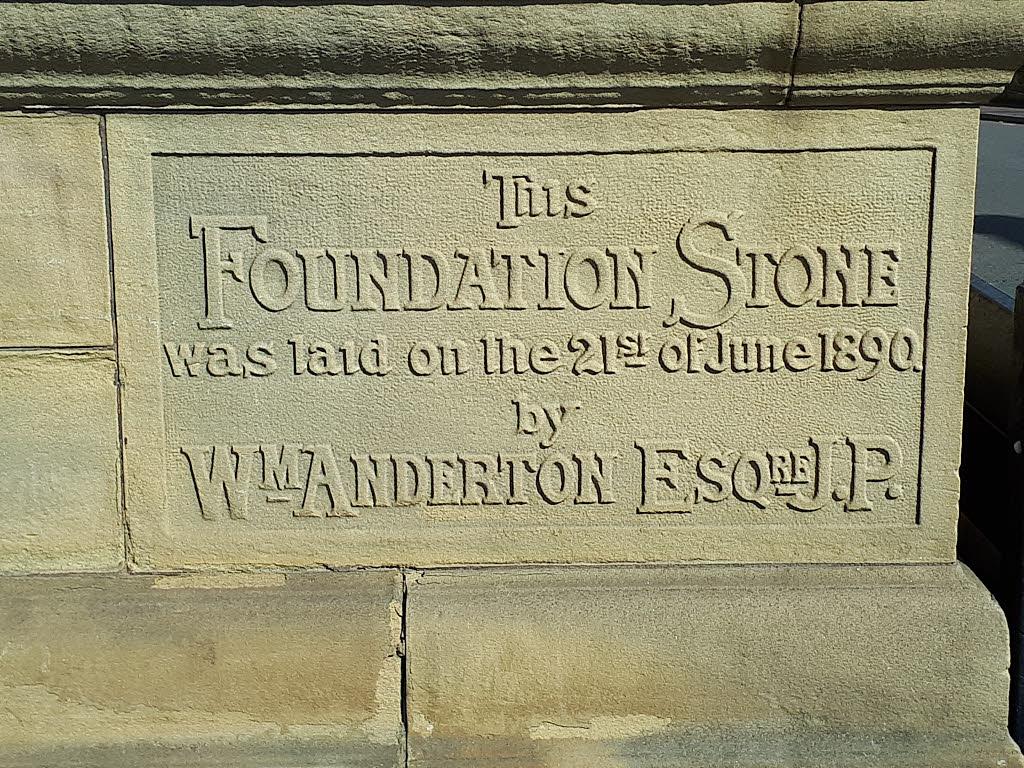
The foundation stone at the town hall

After significant population growth in the second half of the 19th century, particularly associated with carding (disentangling fibres) for the textile industry, civic leaders decided to procure a town hall to celebrate the Golden Jubilee of Queen Victoria: the site they selected had been occupied by a school and some residential properties on the north side of Church Street.

The foundation stone for the new building was laid by William Anderton of Elm Bank on 21 June 1890. It was designed by Mawson & Hudson of Bradford in the Queen Anne style and was built at a cost of £13,900, which was financed, in part, by public subscription. It was officially opened by the Chairman of the Town Hall Committee, Joseph Law, on 10 February 1892. A plaque was subsequently placed in the room adjacent to the assembly hall to commemorate the life of Elymas Wadsworth, Law's predecessor, who had chaired the committee throughout the development stage of the town hall.

The design involved an asymmetrical main frontage with four bays facing onto Bradford Road; the right hand of the two central bays featured a steep flight of steps leading up to an arched doorway with a square clock tower above. The end bay on the left featured an Ipswich window on the first floor with a gable above, while the end bay on the right, which projected forward, featured a small stone balcony with two tall sash windows and a flagpole on the second floor within the gable. Internally, the principal rooms were the council chamber and the assembly hall, the latter of which featured a proscenium arch. The Cambridge-chiming clock was designed and manufactured by Potts of Leeds and the bells were cast by John Taylor & Co of Loughborough.

The building became the headquarters of Cleckheaton Urban District Council, when it was formed in 1894, and of the enlarged Spenborough Urban District Council, when it was established in 1915. On 20 May 1926, the town hall was the venue for an important speech by the future leader of the National Liberal Party, Sir John Simon, who called for unity in the wake of the collapse of the General Strike: he said the British people should "retrace the false steps and acknowledge a grievous error ".

After the council was granted a charter of incorporation in July 1955, the town hall became the headquarters of the new municipal borough. However, it ceased to be the local seat of government when the enlarged Kirklees Council was formed in 1974. A stained glass window which depicted the coat of arms of Spenborough was installed in the town hall after the council was abolished. The town hall became a regular venue for the annual Cleckheaton Folk Festival which promoted local musical and literary initiatives after it was launched in 1988.

== See also ==
- Listed buildings in Cleckheaton
