= Kirklees =

Coordinates: 53.593°N 1.801°W

- Metropolitan borough
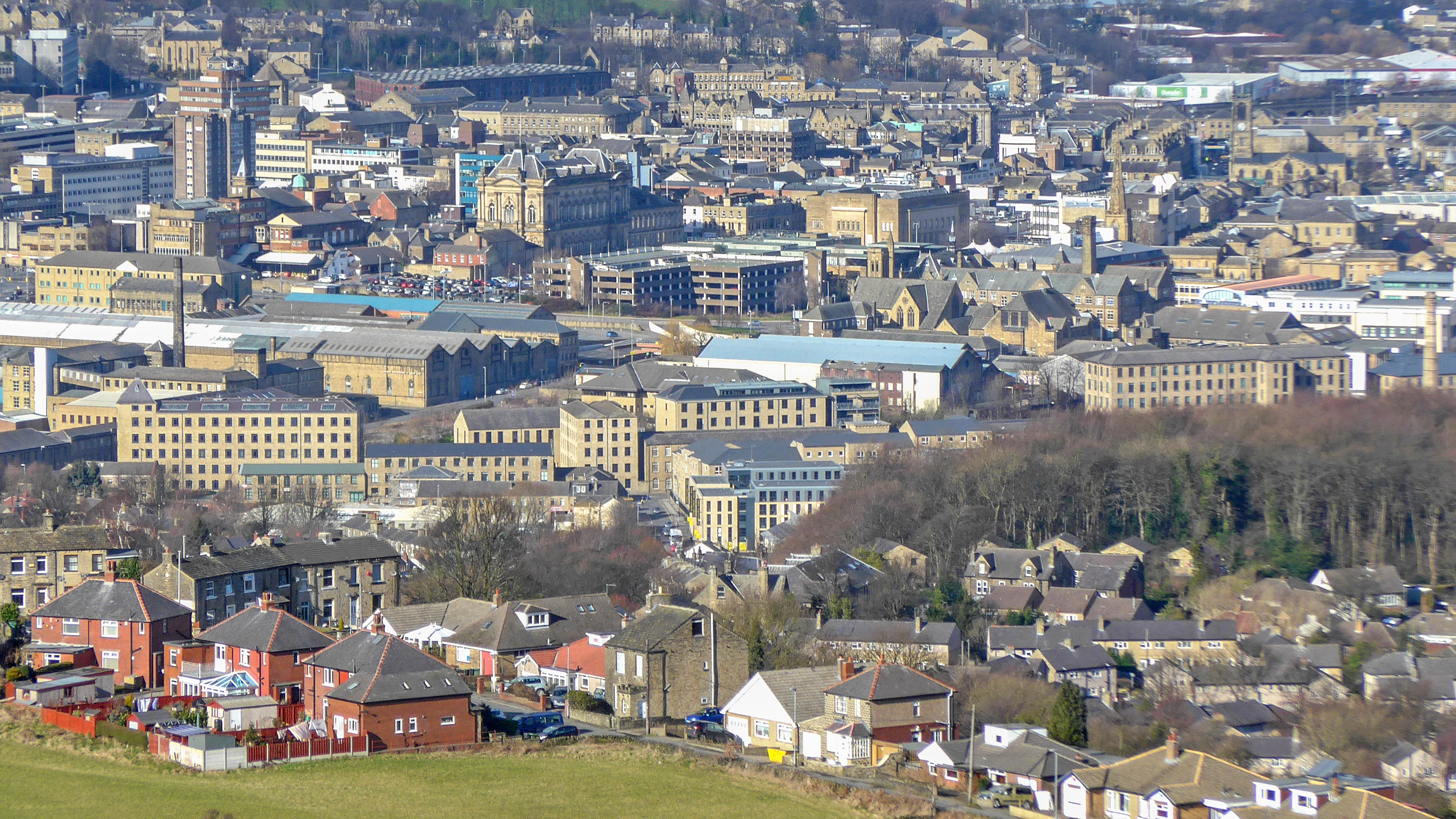
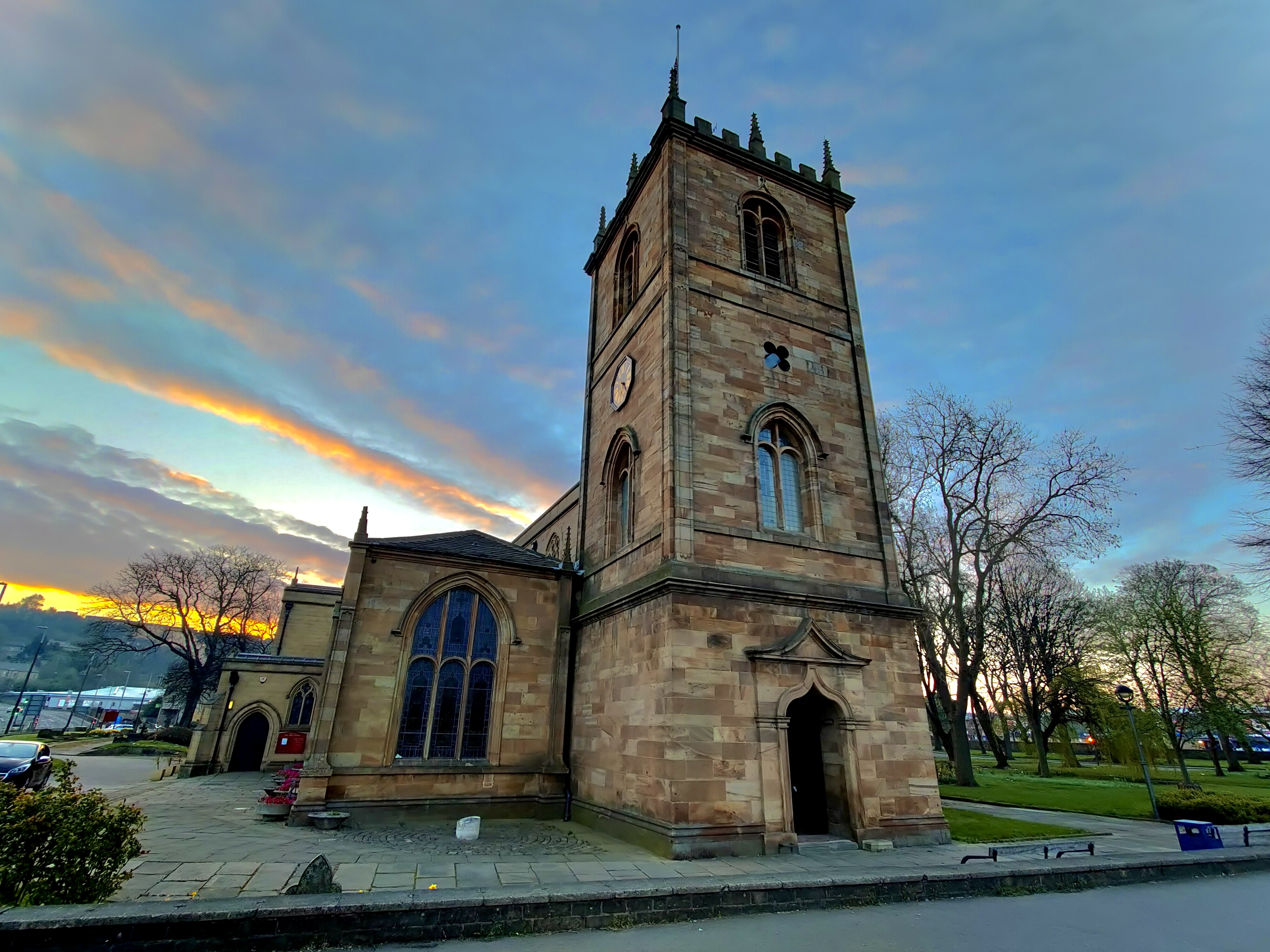
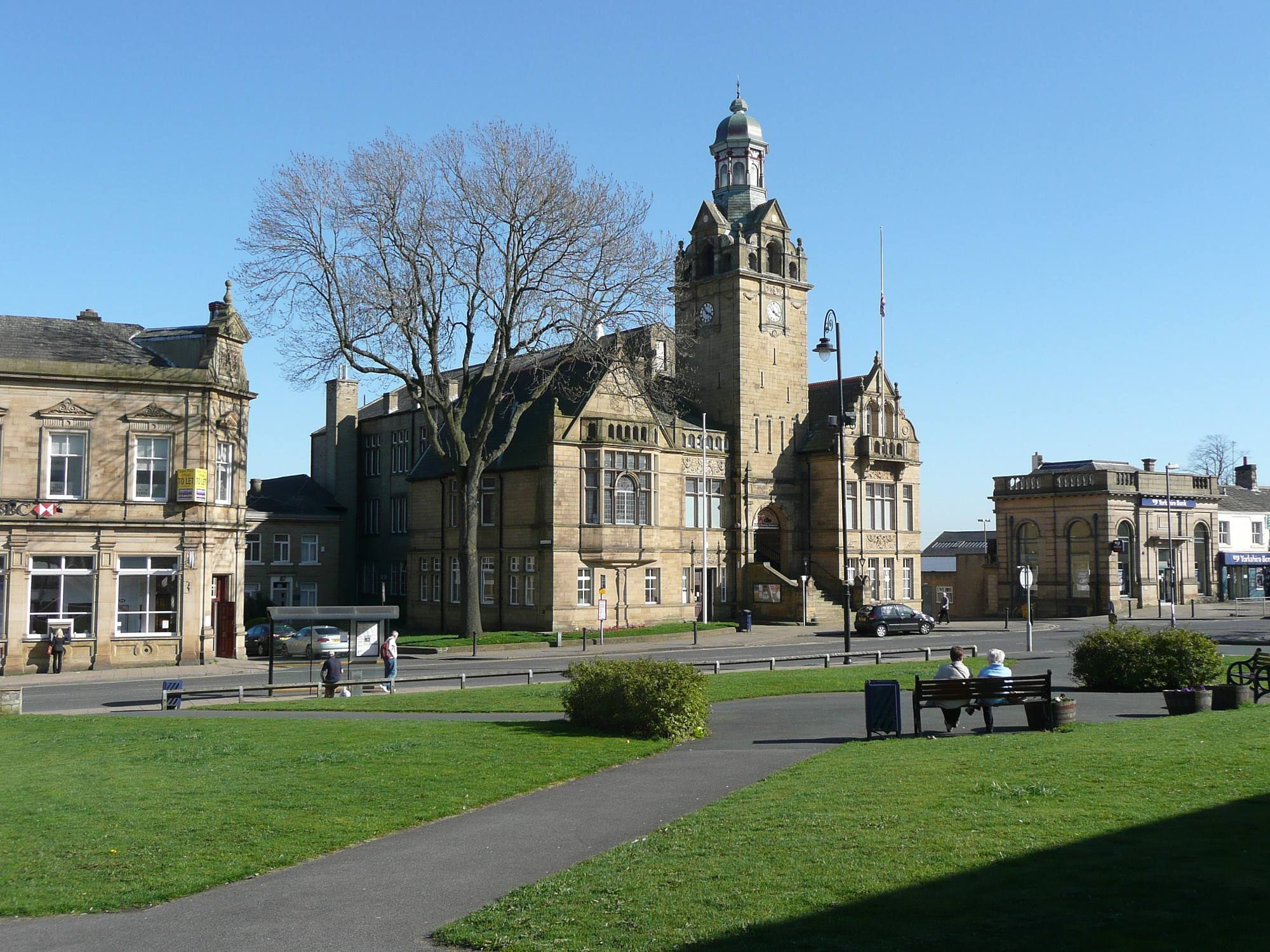
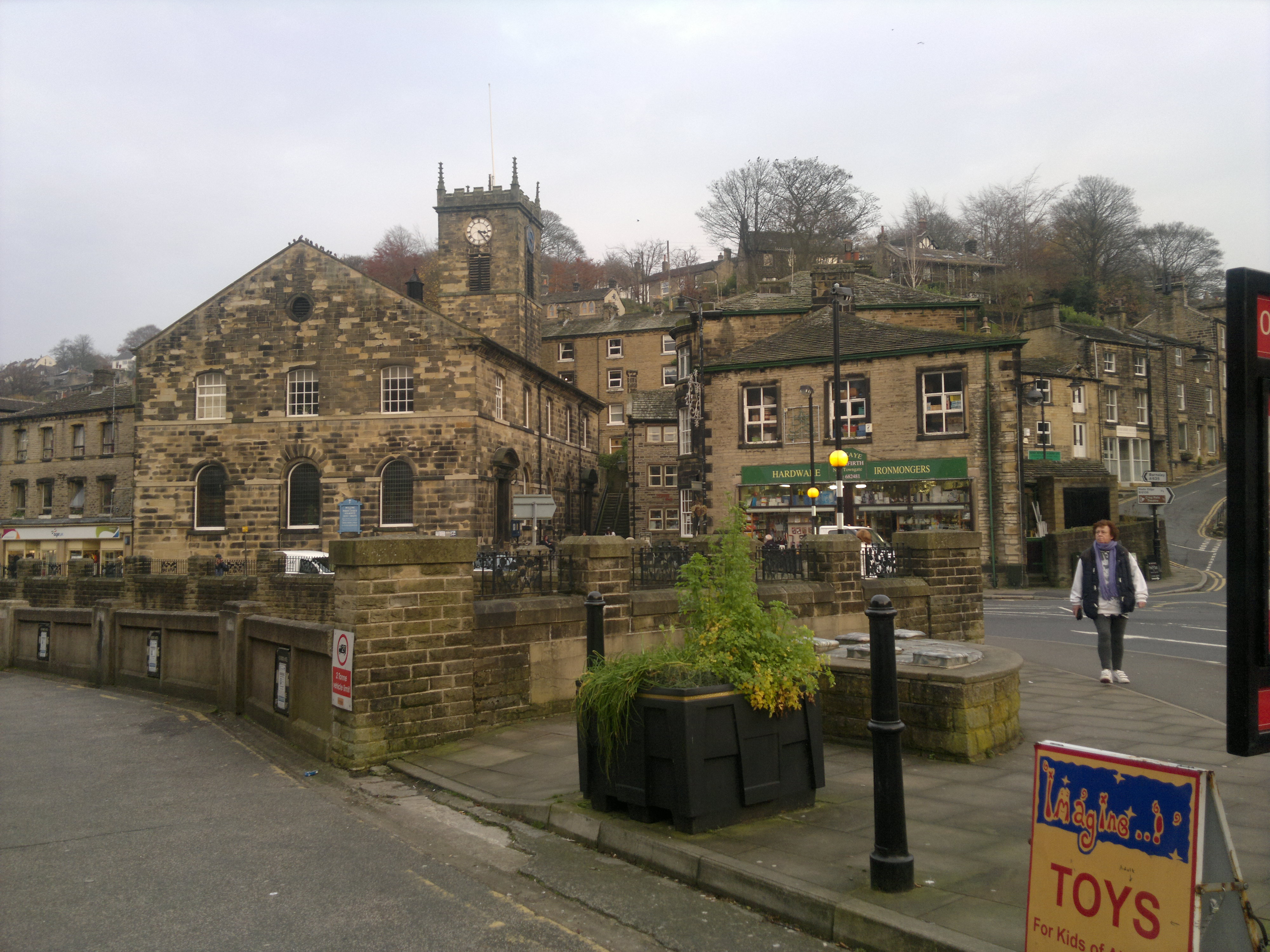
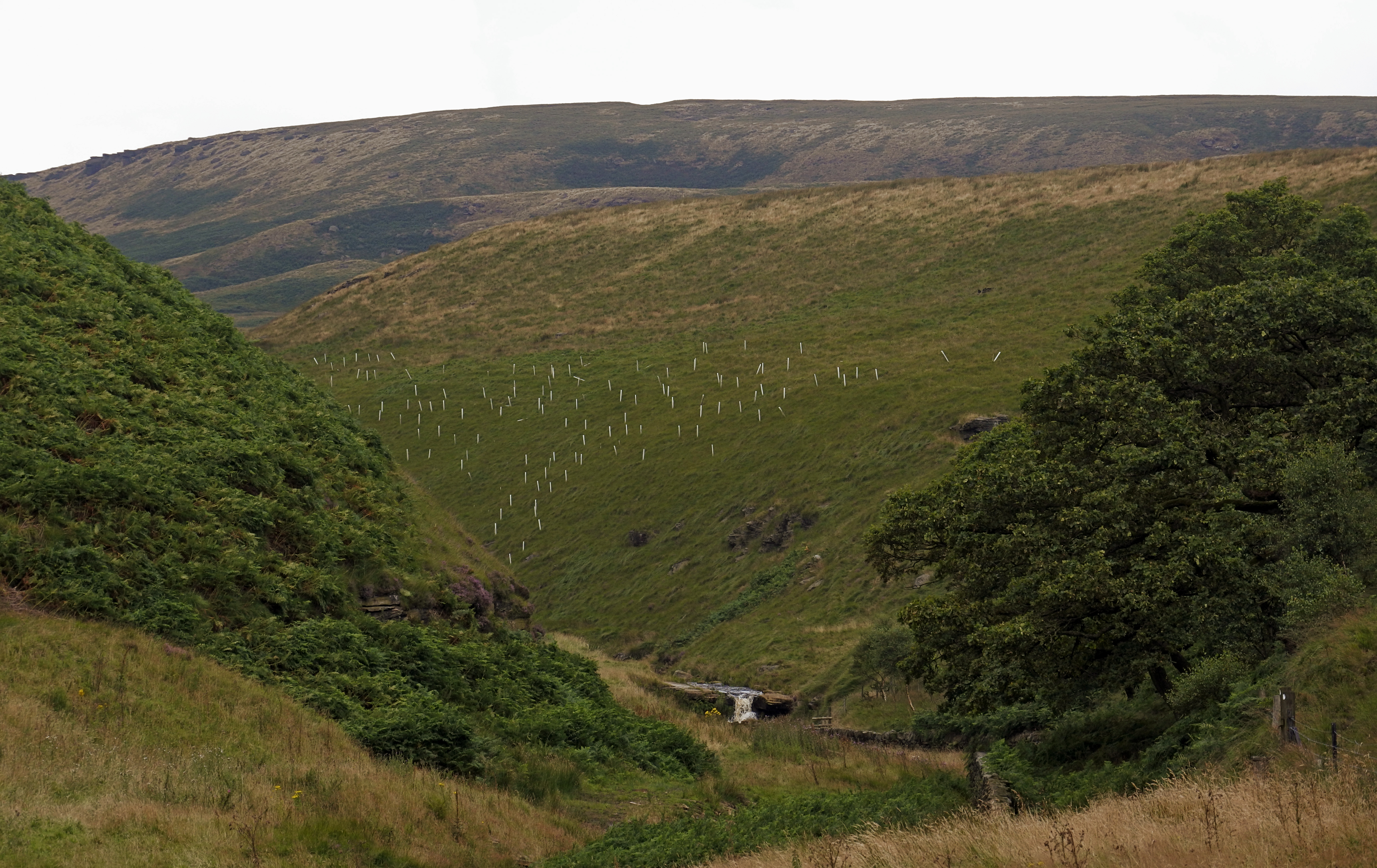
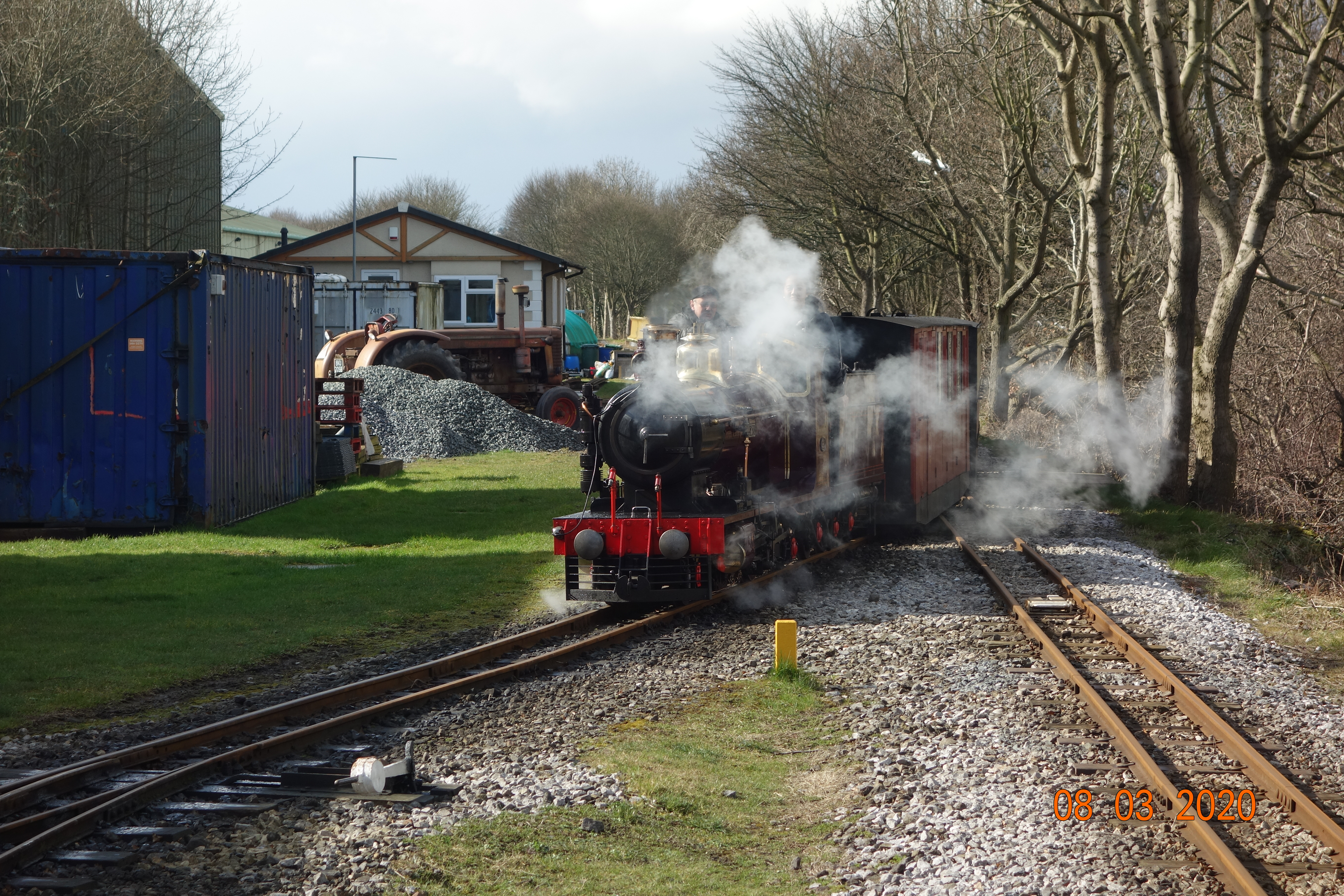
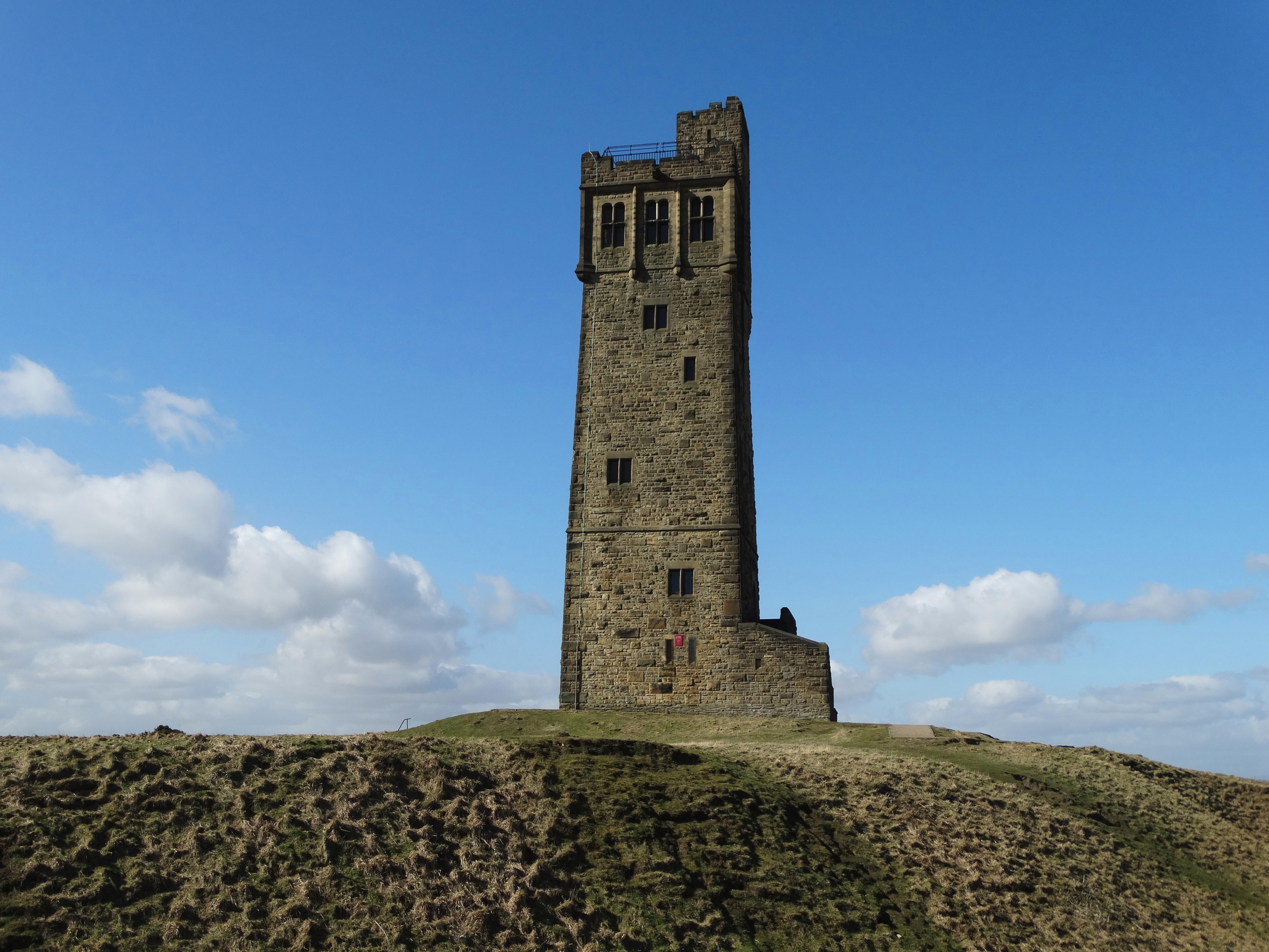
- From left to right; Top: Huddersfield skyline; Upper: Dewsbury Minster and Cleckheaton town hall; Lower: Holmfirth town centre and Marsden Moor; Bottom: Kirklees Light Railway and Castle Hill with the Victoria Tower

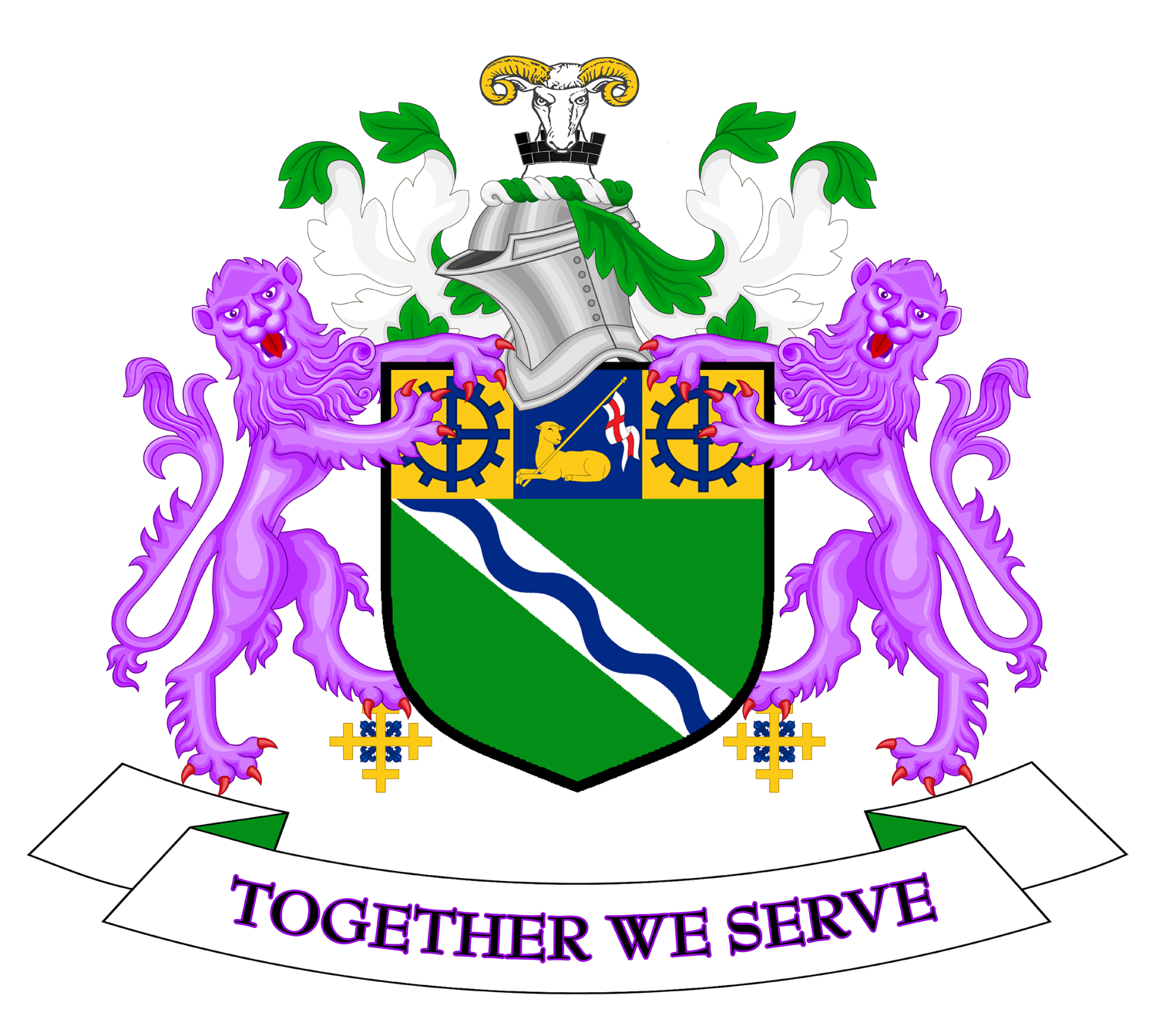
- Coat of arms

- Kirklees shown within West Yorkshire
- Sovereign state: United Kingdom
- Constituent country: England
- Region: Yorkshire and the Humber
- City region: Leeds
- Ceremonial county: West Yorkshire
- Established: 1 April 1974
- Administrative HQ: Huddersfield

Government
  - Type: Metropolitan borough
  - Body: Kirklees Council

Area
  - Total: 158 sq mi (409 km^{2})
  - Rank: 85th

Population (2025)
  - Total: 445,832
  - Rank: 14th
  - Density: 2,830/sq mi (1,091/km^{2})

Ethnicity (2021)
  - Ethnic groups: List: 73.6% White; 19.4% Asian; 3.1% Mixed; 2.3% Black; 1.5% other

Religion (2021)
  - Religion: List: 39.4% Christianity; 34.8% no religion; 18.5% Islam; 5.5% not stated; 0.8% Sikhism; 0.4% Hinduism; 0.4% other; 0.2% Buddhism; 0.1% Judaism
- Time zone: UTC+0 (Greenwich Mean Time)
  - Summer (DST): UTC+1 (British Summer Time)
- Postcode areas: BD, HD, WF
- Dialling codes: 01484 (Huddersfield); 01924 (Wakefield); 01422(Halifax)
- ISO 3166 code: GB-KIR
- Vehicle registration prefix: Y
- GSS code: E08000034
- NUTS 3 code: UKE44
- ONS code: 00CZ
- Councillors: 69
- MPs: Iqbal Mohamed (I); Kim Leadbeater (L); Paul Davies (L); Harpreet Uppal (L)
- Police area: West Yorkshire
- Fire service: West Yorkshire
- Ambulance service: Yorkshire
- Website: kirklees.gov.uk

Kirklees is a metropolitan borough of West Yorkshire, England. The borough comprises the ten towns of Batley, Birstall, Cleckheaton, Dewsbury, Heckmondwike, Holmfirth, Huddersfield, Meltham, Mirfield and Slaithwaite. It is governed by Kirklees Council. Kirklees had a population of 422,500 in 2011; it is the third-largest metropolitan district in Yorkshire by area, behind Doncaster and Leeds.

== History ==
The borough was formed on 1 April 1974 by the provisions of the Local Government Act 1972 as part of a reform of local government in England. Eleven former local government districts were merged: the county boroughs of Huddersfield and Dewsbury, the municipal boroughs of Batley and Spenborough and the urban districts of Colne Valley, Denby Dale, Heckmondwike, Holmfirth, Kirkburton, Meltham and Mirfield.

The name Kirklees was chosen by the merging councils from more than fifty suggestions, including Upper Agbrigg, Brigantia and Wooldale. It was named after Kirklees Priory, which is claimed to be site of Robin Hood's death, situated midway between Huddersfield and Dewsbury. The priory was located within the present-day Kirklees Park estate, most of which actually lies in the neighbouring borough of Calderdale.

Under the original draft of the Act, the district would have included Ossett, part of the Dewsbury Parliamentary constituency at that time. It was eventually decided that Ossett was too remote to be governed from Huddersfield and the town was included within the Wakefield district instead.

== Geography ==
Map showing parished and unparished areas of the borough

Kirklees sits in quite a central position to all the other surrounding unitary boroughs of West Yorkshire, with people living in the northern parts are closer to Leeds and York for work and education. People living in the western parts are closer to Bradford, Halifax and Huddersfield for education and work. People living in the southern and eastern parts are closer to Wakefield, Barnsley, Sheffield and Manchester for work and education. The largest towns in the borough are Huddersfield, Dewsbury, Batley, Heckmondwike and Cleckheaton.

The principal settlements of Kirklees are mill towns in the Colne Valley, Holme Valley, Calder Valley and Spen Valley. Those areas of the district with a more urban character bound Calderdale to the west, Bradford to the north-west, Leeds to the north-east and Wakefield to the east.

The district also includes several rural villages, with the largest rural area extending from the south of Huddersfield. The Pennine countryside to the south-west of Meltham and Holme lies within the Peak District National Park. This moorland area mostly bounds Saddleworth, a traditional part of Yorkshire but now locally governed from Oldham, Greater Manchester. There is also a relatively short border with the High Peak district of Derbyshire, running across the summit of Black Hill, and the main border to the south of Kirklees is with Barnsley.

The inclusion of two county boroughs resulted in a district without an obvious centre. Over the years there have been suggestions of splitting the district into two, administered from Huddersfield and Dewsbury. Graham Riddick, as MP for Colne Valley, campaigned for a split in the early 1990s. A similar ambition was mentioned by Elizabeth Peacock, MP for Batley and Spen in 1991. The boundaries of metropolitan boroughs were outside the remit of the Banham Commission appointed to review local government structures in 1992 or its successors, and only minor boundary changes were made with neighbouring districts in 1994.

The district includes parts of three postcode areas. Huddersfield and the rural areas to the south have HD postcodes, Birkenshaw, Cleckheaton and Gomersal have BD postcodes, and the rest of the Heavy Woollen area has WF postcodes. Similarly the district is split between several telephone dialling codes, with most residents in the 01484 (Huddersfield), 01274 (Bradford) and 01924 (Wakefield) codes. A small number of residents in Birchencliffe and Birkenshaw villages fall within the 01422 (Halifax) and 0113 (Leeds) codes respectively.

== Transport ==
Public transport information is provided by Metro, as is the case across the rest of West Yorkshire.

=== Rail ===
Kirklees lies along the core Huddersfield line of the TransPennine Express network, with services calling at Huddersfield and Dewsbury. Direct Grand Central services to London King's Cross call at Mirfield. Other railway stations in the district on these routes and on the Penistone line have local Northern Trains services. Some towns in Kirklees have not been served by rail transport since the Beeching cuts. Dewsbury and Batley are served by the Calder Valley Line and the TransPennine Express lines. These serve an important urban area around Leeds and Kirklees with services to further away stations including Manchester Victoria and Liverpool Lime Street.

=== Bus ===
Most bus services in the Huddersfield area are operated by Team Pennine and First West Yorkshire, and most bus services in the Heavy Woollen area are operated by Arriva Yorkshire.

=== Road ===
The urban areas of Kirklees are served by the M62 and M1 motorways. Parts of the local road network are considered to require improvement, such as the main route from Huddersfield to the southbound M1 which narrows as it passes through Flockton.

=== Bicycle ===
Kirklees Council has developed a number of traffic-free cycle paths called Greenways in partnership with Sustrans.

== Demography ==
=== Ethnicity ===
Ethnic Group	1981 estimations		1991 census		2001 census		2011 census		2021 census	
Ethnic Group	Number	%	Number	%	Number	%	Number	%	Number	%
White: Total	342,952	91.5%	340,246	89.1%	332,659	85.6%	334,270	79.1%	318,969	73.6%
White: British	–	–	–	–	325,348	83.7%	323,890	76.7%	305,579	70.5%
White: Irish	–	–			3,458	0.9%	2,635		2,335	
White: Gypsy or Irish Traveller	–	–	–	–	–	–	158		168	
White: Roma	–	–	–	–	–	–	–	–	314	
White: Other	–	–	–	–	3,853		7,587		10,573	
Asian or Asian British: Total	24,320	6.5%	32,257		44,716		67,782		84,202	19.4%
Asian or Asian British: Indian	9,809		12,379		15,829		20,797		22,739	
Asian or Asian British: Pakistani	13,267		18,185		26,536		41,802		54,795	
Asian or Asian British: Bangladeshi	168		234		388		731		1,065	
Asian or Asian British: Chinese	386		501		611		1,452		1,526	
Asian or Asian British: Other Asian	690		958		1,352		3,000		4,077	
Black or Black British: Total	5,808		6,842		5,246		7,905		9,948	
Black or Black British: Caribbean	4,026		4,613		4,203		4,626		4,324	
Black or Black British: African	348		396		476		2,364		4,180	
Black or Black British: Other Black	1,434		1,833		567		915		1,444	
Mixed: Total	–	–	–	–	5,414		9,790		13,588	
Mixed: White and Black Caribbean	–	–	–	–	2,927		5,167		6,433	
Mixed: White and Black African	–	–	–	–	268		641		1,035	
Mixed: White and Asian	–	–	–	–	1,557		2,714		3,980	
Mixed: Other Mixed	–	–	–	–	662		1,268		2,140	
Other: Total	1,681		2,154				2,711		6,506	
Other: Arab	–	–	–	–	–	–	1,214		1,915	
Other: Any other ethnic group	1,681		2,154		532		1,497		4,591	
Ethnic minority	31,809		41,254		55,908		88,188		114,244	
Total	374,761	100%	381,500	100%	388,567	100%	422,458	100%	433,213	100%

== Tourism ==
Tourism in Kirklees is based around the area's countryside and industrial heritage:

- All Saints' Church, Batley
- Bagshaw Museum
- Castle Hill
- Cleckheaton Town Hall
- Colne Valley Museum
- Dewsbury Minster
- Dewsbury Town Hall
- Holmfirth, setting of long-running sitcom Last of the Summer Wine
- Huddersfield Town Hall
- Kirklees Light Railway
- Kirklees Way, 72 miles (116 km) circular walking route
- Marsden Moor Estate
- Mount Pleasant, Batley
- Oakwell Hall
- Spen Valley Greenway
- St Peter's Church, Huddersfield
- Standedge Tunnels and Visitor Centre
- Tolson Museum

Kirklees Council closed Dewsbury Museum and Red House Museum at the end of 2016, claiming it could not afford to continue running them following cuts to its budget.

Tourist information in Kirklees can be obtained from major libraries.

== Sport ==
Huddersfield Town play football in the EFL Championship as of the 2022–23 season. They were the first English club to win three successive league titles. There are also 3 semi professional football teams within Kirklees, Liversedge, Emley and Golcar United.

The birthplace of rugby league was at the George Hotel, Huddersfield; local clubs include Super League side Huddersfield Giants, alongside Batley Bulldogs and Dewsbury Rams who both play in the Championship.

Kirklees Active Leisure is a charitable trust which operates sport centres.

== Media ==
Kirklees is served by BBC Yorkshire and ITV Yorkshire broadcasting from the Emley Moor transmitter which is situated near the village of Emley, in Huddersfield.

Local radio stations are:

- BBC Radio Leeds on 92.4 FM
- Heart Yorkshire on 106.2 FM
- Capital Yorkshire on 105.1 FM
- Pulse 1 on 102.5 FM
- Greatest Hits Radio West Yorkshire on 96.3 FM
- Branch FM on 101.8 FM (for Dewsbury)

Local newspapers are Huddersfield Daily Examiner, Yorkshire Evening Post and Yorkshire Post.

== Governance ==
=== Council ===
Kirklees Council is the local authority of the district. The council is composed of 69 councillors, three for each of the borough's 23 wards. Elections are held three years out of four, on the first Thursday of May. One third of the councillors are elected, for a four-year term, in each election.

=== Borough status and mayoralty ===
The shadow Kirklees District Council petitioned the privy council for a royal charter under section 245 of the Local Government Act 1972 granting the status of a borough from 1 April 1974. The grant of borough status entitled the chairman of the council to the title of "mayor", effectively continuing the mayoralties of the former boroughs of Dewsbury (1862), Huddersfield (1898), Batley (1869) and Spenborough (1955). The mayor is elected from among the councillors for a one-year term (the "civic year") at the council's annual meeting.

Kirklees is the most populated borough or district in England not to have city status. In 2001 it was announced that a grant of city status was to be made to an English town to mark the Golden Jubilee of Elizabeth II, and Kirklees council indicated that it was considering applying on behalf of Huddersfield. An unofficial telephone poll by the Huddersfield Examiner found a slim majority against the proposal, and the council did not proceed with the application.

==== Freedom of the borough ====
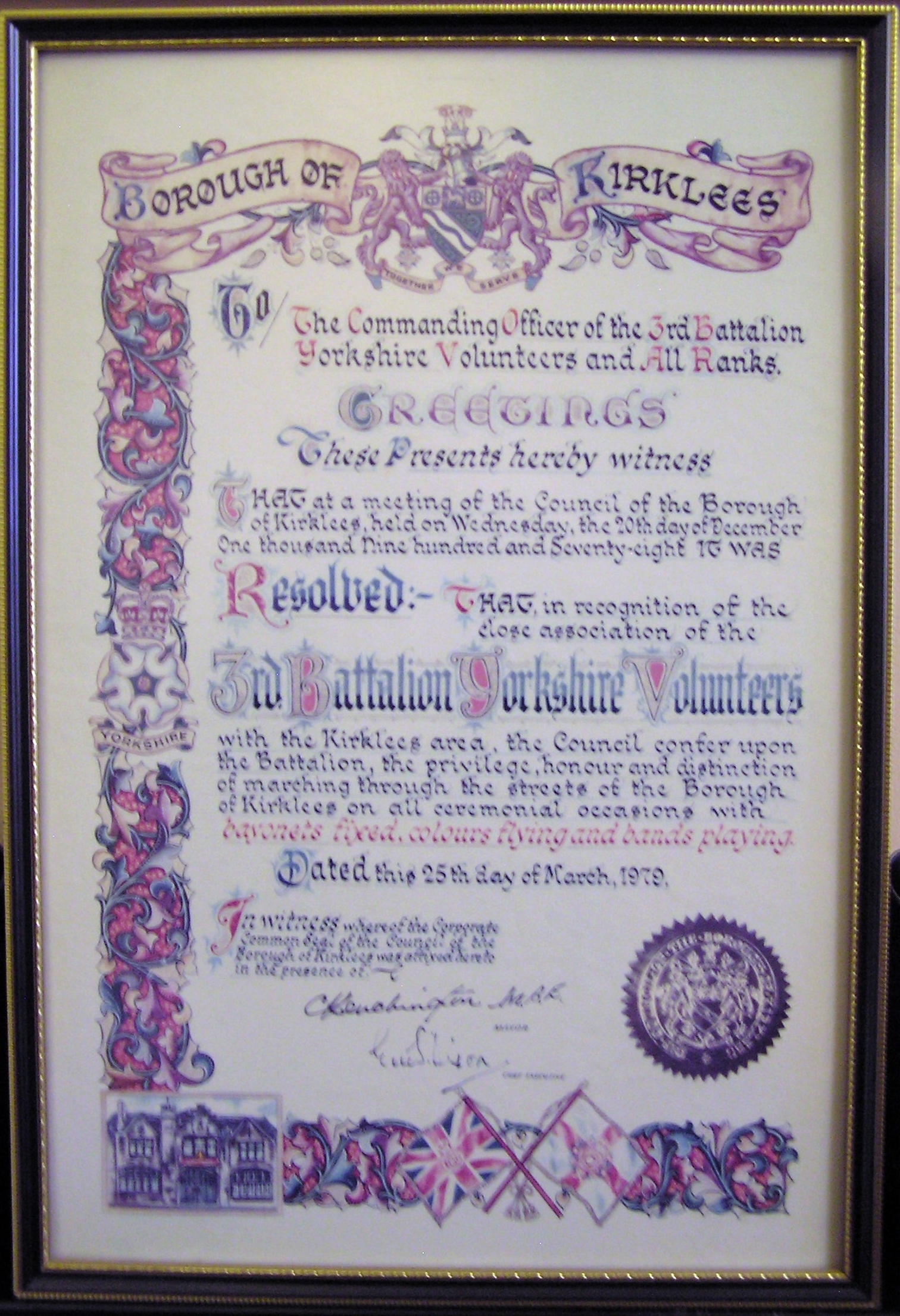
Yorkshire Volunteers Freedom Scroll

Borough status also allows the council to confer the freedom of the borough on "persons of distinction". Since its formation Kirklees Council has granted this right to two individuals and two groups:

- 3rd Battalion Yorkshire Volunteers - (25 March 1979) On 25 March 1979, Kirklees Metropolitan Borough Council gave the Freedom of Kirklees to the 3rd Battalion of the Yorkshire Volunteers. The 3rd Battalion was at that time the Duke of Wellington's Regiment (West Riding) Territorial Army unit. However the freedom given by Kirklees to the 3rd battalion of the Yorkshire Volunteers did not permit any transfer to heirs or successors and effectively that freedom ceased when the battalion was amalgamated into the East and West Riding Regiment on 1 July 1999. The East and West Riding Regiment ceased to exist on 6 June 2006, having been merged into the Yorkshire Regiment as its 4th Battalion. The Yorkshire Regiment requested the freedom to march to be transferred to them. On 25 October 2008 Kirklees Council transferred the Freedom of Huddersfield to the Yorkshire Regiment at a freedom parade held by the 3rd Battalion, formerly the Duke of Wellington's Regiment (West Riding).
- Sir William Mallalieu MP (27 January 1980)
- The Rt Hon Betty Boothroyd MP (20 November 1992)
- Citizens of Besançon, France (7 October 2005)
- The Yorkshire Regiment (25 October 2008)
- Simon Armitage (20 March 2024)
- Sir Patrick Stewart (20 March 2024)

=== Twin towns ===
Kirklees is twinned with:

- Besançon, France
- Kostanay, Kazakhstan 1989
- Bielsko-Biała, Poland 1997
- Kreis Unna, Germany 1967

=== Coat of arms ===
Kirklees Borough Council was granted armorial bearings by the College of Arms by letters patent dated 24 June 1974. the blazon of the arms is as follows:

Vert on a bend Argent a bendlet wavy azure on a chief Or a pale between two cog-wheels azure on the pale a Paschal Lamb supporting a staff of the fourth flying therefrom a forked pennon argent charged with a cross gules; and for a Crest, On a wreath of the colours a ram's head affronty couped argent armed Or gorged with a mural crown sable masoned argent.

Supporters: On either side a lion guardant purpure resting the inner hind leg on a cross crosslet Or embellished in each of the four angles with a fleur de lis azure. Badge or device: A roundel purpure charged with a Lacy Knot Or all within a circle of eleven roses argent barbed and seeded proper.

The green colouring of the shield represents the fields, woods and moorland of the borough. The white stripe or bend represents the M62 motorway, while the blue wave upon it is for the many waterways of the area. On the chief or upper third of the shield is a paschal lamb, symbol of St John the Baptist. John was the patron saint of woolworkers, and the inclusion of the emblem represents the historic woollen industry. The cogwheels are for the modern engineering industries. The crest is a ram's head, found in the arms of the County Borough of Huddersfield and the Mirfield Urban District Council. The black mural crown stands for the district's status as a borough, recalling a city wall. The supporters are purple lions from the arms of the de Laci family, medieval lords of Huddersfield. For heraldic "difference" from other lion supporters a distinctive cross has been placed below their inner feet. This device, combining the symbols of Christ and the Virgin Mary, represents the priory from which the borough took its name.

=== Parish and town councils ===
In five areas of the borough there is a second tier of local government: the civil parish. Parish or town councils have limited powers of a purely local character, such as owning or maintaining allotments, burial grounds, footpaths and war memorials. Four of the parishes were formed as successor parishes to urban districts abolished in 1974. The fifth was formed in 1988. The five town or parish councils are:

Council	Area covered	Number of councillors	Parish wards	Formed
Denby Dale Parish Council	Denby Dale, Upper and Lower Cumberworth, Upper and Lower Denby, Birdsedge and High Flatts, Scissett, Skelmanthorpe and the hamlet of Kitchenroyd, Emley and Emley Moor and Clayton West	17	Clayton West, Denby & Cumberworth, Emley, Skelmanthorpe	Successor to Denby Dale UDC 1973
Holme Valley Parish Council	Holmfirth and Honley, Brockholes, Cinderhills, Hade Edge, Hepworth, Hinchliffe Mill, Holmbridge, Holme, Jackson Bridge, Netherthong, New Mill, Scholes, Thongsbridge, Upperthong, Wooldale	23	Brockholes, Fulstone, Hepworth, Holmfirth Central, Honley Central and East, Honley South, Honley West, Netherthong, Scholes, Upper Holme Valley, Upperthong, Wooldale	Successor to Holmfirth UDC 1973, renamed Holme Valley 1975.
Kirkburton Parish Council	Farnley Tyas, Flockton, Grange Moor, Highburton, Kirkburton, Kirkheaton, Lepton, Shelley, Shepley and Thurston	25	Flockton, Kirkburton, Kirkheaton, Lepton, Lepton & Whitley Upper, Shelley, Shepley, Thurstonland/Farnley Tyas	Successor to Kirkburton UDC 1973
Meltham Town Council	Crosland Edge, Meltham, Helme, Wilshaw	12	None	Successor to Meltham UDC 1973
Mirfield Town Council	Battyeford, Mirfield, Northorpe, Lower Hopton and Upper Hopton	16	Battyeford, Crossley, Eastthorpe, Hopton, Northorpe	Formed 1988

The remainder of the borough is unparished, with the borough council exercising parish powers.

=== Parliamentary representation ===
==== 1997 to date ====
Since 1997 Kirklees has been divided into five constituencies: four being entirely within the borough, while one ward (Wakefield) is included in the Wakefield Council borough. The boundaries of two of the Colne Valley and Huddersfield constituencies were virtually unchanged from those defined in 1983. Denby Dale and Kirkburton wards were transferred from Dewsbury to Wakefield, with the former constituency receiving Heckmondwike ward from Batley and Spen.

The constituencies were first used at the 1997 general election, when the Labour Party came to power in a landslide, gaining all the seats in the borough. The party held the seats at the subsequent elections of 2001 and 2005. The incumbent MP for Batley and Spen, Jo Cox, was murdered on 16 June 2016. A constituency by-election took place on 20 October 2016 and Tracy Brabin was elected.

Constituency	Wards	Member of parliament	Party	Majority
Batley and Spen Borough Constituency	1997–2005: Batley East, Batley West, Birstall and Birkenshaw, Cleckheaton, Spen. 2010–present: Batley East, Batley West, Birstall and Birkenshaw, Cleckheaton, Heckmondwike, Liversedge and Gomersal.	Tracy Brabin	Labour Co-op	2017: 8,961 (over Conservatives)
Batley and Spen Borough Constituency	1997–2005: Batley East, Batley West, Birstall and Birkenshaw, Cleckheaton, Spen. 2010–present: Batley East, Batley West, Birstall and Birkenshaw, Cleckheaton, Heckmondwike, Liversedge and Gomersal.	Jo Cox	Labour Party	2015: 6,057 (over Conservatives)
Batley and Spen Borough Constituency	1997–2005: Batley East, Batley West, Birstall and Birkenshaw, Cleckheaton, Spen. 2010–present: Batley East, Batley West, Birstall and Birkenshaw, Cleckheaton, Heckmondwike, Liversedge and Gomersal.	Mike Wood	Labour Party	2010: 4,406 (over Conservatives)
Batley and Spen Borough Constituency	1997–2005: Batley East, Batley West, Birstall and Birkenshaw, Cleckheaton, Spen. 2010–present: Batley East, Batley West, Birstall and Birkenshaw, Cleckheaton, Heckmondwike, Liversedge and Gomersal.	Mike Wood	Labour Party	2005: 5,788 (over Conservatives)
Batley and Spen Borough Constituency	1997–2005: Batley East, Batley West, Birstall and Birkenshaw, Cleckheaton, Spen. 2010–present: Batley East, Batley West, Birstall and Birkenshaw, Cleckheaton, Heckmondwike, Liversedge and Gomersal.	Mike Wood	Labour Party	2001: 5,064 (over Conservatives)
Batley and Spen Borough Constituency	1997–2005: Batley East, Batley West, Birstall and Birkenshaw, Cleckheaton, Spen. 2010–present: Batley East, Batley West, Birstall and Birkenshaw, Cleckheaton, Heckmondwike, Liversedge and Gomersal.	Mike Wood	Labour Party	1997: 6,141 (over Conservatives)
Colne Valley County Constituency	Colne Valley West, Crosland Moor, Golcar, Holme Valley North, Holme Valley South, Lindley.	Thelma Walker	Labour Party	2017: 915 (over Conservatives)
Colne Valley County Constituency	Colne Valley West, Crosland Moor, Golcar, Holme Valley North, Holme Valley South, Lindley.	Jason McCartney	Conservative Party	2015: 5,378 (over Labour)
Colne Valley County Constituency	Colne Valley West, Crosland Moor, Golcar, Holme Valley North, Holme Valley South, Lindley.	Jason McCartney	Conservative Party	2010: 4,837 (over Liberal Democrats)
Colne Valley County Constituency	Colne Valley West, Crosland Moor, Golcar, Holme Valley North, Holme Valley South, Lindley.	Kali Mountford	Labour Party	2005: 1,501 (over Conservatives)
Colne Valley County Constituency	Colne Valley West, Crosland Moor, Golcar, Holme Valley North, Holme Valley South, Lindley.	Kali Mountford	Labour Party	2001: 4,639 (over Conservatives)
Colne Valley County Constituency	Colne Valley West, Crosland Moor, Golcar, Holme Valley North, Holme Valley South, Lindley.	Kali Mountford	Labour Party	1997: 4,840 (over Conservatives)
Dewsbury County Constituency	1997–2005: Dewsbury East, Dewsbury West, Heckmondwike, Mirfield, Thornhill. 2010–present: Denby Dale, Dewsbury East, Dewsbury South, Dewsbury West, Kirkburton, Mirfield.	Paula Sherriff	Labour Party	2017: 3,321 (over Conservatives)
Dewsbury County Constituency	1997–2005: Dewsbury East, Dewsbury West, Heckmondwike, Mirfield, Thornhill. 2010–present: Denby Dale, Dewsbury East, Dewsbury South, Dewsbury West, Kirkburton, Mirfield.	Paula Sherriff	Labour Party	2015: 1,451 (over Conservatives)
Dewsbury County Constituency	1997–2005: Dewsbury East, Dewsbury West, Heckmondwike, Mirfield, Thornhill. 2010–present: Denby Dale, Dewsbury East, Dewsbury South, Dewsbury West, Kirkburton, Mirfield.	Simon Reevell	Conservative Party	2010: 1,526 (over Labour)
Dewsbury County Constituency	1997–2005: Dewsbury East, Dewsbury West, Heckmondwike, Mirfield, Thornhill. 2010–present: Denby Dale, Dewsbury East, Dewsbury South, Dewsbury West, Kirkburton, Mirfield.	Shahid Malik	Labour Party	2005: 4,615 (over Conservatives)
Dewsbury County Constituency	1997–2005: Dewsbury East, Dewsbury West, Heckmondwike, Mirfield, Thornhill. 2010–present: Denby Dale, Dewsbury East, Dewsbury South, Dewsbury West, Kirkburton, Mirfield.	Ann Taylor	Labour Party	2001: 8,323 (over Conservatives)
Dewsbury County Constituency	1997–2005: Dewsbury East, Dewsbury West, Heckmondwike, Mirfield, Thornhill. 2010–present: Denby Dale, Dewsbury East, Dewsbury South, Dewsbury West, Kirkburton, Mirfield.	Ann Taylor	Labour Party	1997: 4,840 (over Conservatives)
Huddersfield Borough Constituency	Almondbury, Birkby, Dalton, Deighton, Greenhead, Newsome, Paddock.	Harpreet Uppal	Labour Party	2017: 12,005 (over Conservatives)
Huddersfield Borough Constituency	Almondbury, Birkby, Dalton, Deighton, Greenhead, Newsome, Paddock.	Harpreet Uppal	Labour Party	2015: 7,345 (over Conservatives)
Huddersfield Borough Constituency	Almondbury, Birkby, Dalton, Deighton, Greenhead, Newsome, Paddock.	Harpreet Uppal	Labour Party	2010: 4,472 (over Conservatives)
Huddersfield Borough Constituency	Almondbury, Birkby, Dalton, Deighton, Greenhead, Newsome, Paddock.	Harpreet Uppal	Labour Party	2005: 8,351 (over Conservatives)
Huddersfield Borough Constituency	Almondbury, Birkby, Dalton, Deighton, Greenhead, Newsome, Paddock.	Harpreet Uppal	Labour Party	2001: 10,046 (over Conservatives)
Huddersfield Borough Constituency	Almondbury, Birkby, Dalton, Deighton, Greenhead, Newsome, Paddock.	Harpreet Uppal	Labour Party	1997: 15,848 (over Conservatives)
Wakefield County Constituency	1997–2005: Denby Dale, Kirkburton, Wakefield Central, Wakefield East, Wakefield North, Wakefield Rural. 2010–present: Horbury and South Ossett, Ossett, Wakefield East, Wakefield North, Wakefield Rural, Wakefield West.	Mary Creagh	Labour Party	2017: 2,176 (over Conservatives)
Wakefield County Constituency	1997–2005: Denby Dale, Kirkburton, Wakefield Central, Wakefield East, Wakefield North, Wakefield Rural. 2010–present: Horbury and South Ossett, Ossett, Wakefield East, Wakefield North, Wakefield Rural, Wakefield West.	Mary Creagh	Labour Party	2015: 2,613 (over Conservatives)
Wakefield County Constituency	1997–2005: Denby Dale, Kirkburton, Wakefield Central, Wakefield East, Wakefield North, Wakefield Rural. 2010–present: Horbury and South Ossett, Ossett, Wakefield East, Wakefield North, Wakefield Rural, Wakefield West.	Mary Creagh	Labour Party	2010: 1,613 (over Conservatives)
Wakefield County Constituency	1997–2005: Denby Dale, Kirkburton, Wakefield Central, Wakefield East, Wakefield North, Wakefield Rural. 2010–present: Horbury and South Ossett, Ossett, Wakefield East, Wakefield North, Wakefield Rural, Wakefield West.	Mary Creagh	Labour Party	2005: 5,154 (over Conservatives)
Wakefield County Constituency	1997–2005: Denby Dale, Kirkburton, Wakefield Central, Wakefield East, Wakefield North, Wakefield Rural. 2010–present: Horbury and South Ossett, Ossett, Wakefield East, Wakefield North, Wakefield Rural, Wakefield West.	David Hinchliffe	Labour Party	2001: 7,954 (over Conservatives)
Wakefield County Constituency	1997–2005: Denby Dale, Kirkburton, Wakefield Central, Wakefield East, Wakefield North, Wakefield Rural. 2010–present: Horbury and South Ossett, Ossett, Wakefield East, Wakefield North, Wakefield Rural, Wakefield West.	David Hinchliffe	Labour Party	1997: 14,604 (over Conservatives)

==== 1983 to 1997 ====
The 1983 general election was the first at which constituencies based on the administrative areas created in 1974 were used. Kirklees was divided into four constituencies. The Conservative Party polled well in the 1983 election, and took two of the borough's constituencies. Labour held Huddersfield, while the Liberals, running in an alliance with the Social Democrats, held Colne Valley. In the following election in 1987 the Labour vote increased slightly, and they gained Dewsbury from the Conservatives. At the same time the Alliance vote fell, and the Conservatives took Colne Valley. The four MPs elected in 1992 were all returned in 1997.

Constituency	Wards	Member of parliament	Party	Majority
Batley and Spen Borough Constituency	Batley East, Batley West, Birstall and Birkenshaw, Cleckheaton, Heckmondwike and Spen	Elizabeth Peacock	Conservative Party	1992: 1,408 (over Labour)
Batley and Spen Borough Constituency	Batley East, Batley West, Birstall and Birkenshaw, Cleckheaton, Heckmondwike and Spen	Elizabeth Peacock	Conservative Party	1987: 1,362 (over Labour)
Batley and Spen Borough Constituency	Batley East, Batley West, Birstall and Birkenshaw, Cleckheaton, Heckmondwike and Spen	Elizabeth Peacock	Conservative Party	1983: 870 (over Labour)
Colne Valley County Constituency	Colne Valley West, Crosland Moor, Golcar, Holme Valley North, Holme Valley South and Lindley.	Graham Riddick	Conservative Party	1992: 7,225 (over Labour)
Colne Valley County Constituency	Colne Valley West, Crosland Moor, Golcar, Holme Valley North, Holme Valley South and Lindley.	Graham Riddick	Conservative Party	1987: 1,677 (over Liberal / Alliance)
Colne Valley County Constituency	Colne Valley West, Crosland Moor, Golcar, Holme Valley North, Holme Valley South and Lindley.	Richard Wainwright	Liberal / Alliance	1983: 3,146 (over Conservatives)
Dewsbury County Constituency	Denby Dale, Dewsbury East, Dewsbury West, Kirkburton, Mirfield and Thornhill.	Ann Taylor	Labour Party	1992: 634 (over Conservatives))
Dewsbury County Constituency	Denby Dale, Dewsbury East, Dewsbury West, Kirkburton, Mirfield and Thornhill.	Ann Taylor	Labour Party	1987: 445 (over Conservatives)
Dewsbury County Constituency	Denby Dale, Dewsbury East, Dewsbury West, Kirkburton, Mirfield and Thornhill.	John Whitfield	Conservative Party	1983: 2,068 (over Labour)
Huddersfield Borough Constituency	Almondbury, Birkby, Dalton, Deighton, Newsome and Paddock.	Barry Sheerman	Labour Party	1992: 7,258 (over Conservatives)
Huddersfield Borough Constituency	Almondbury, Birkby, Dalton, Deighton, Newsome and Paddock.	Barry Sheerman	Labour Party	1987: 7,278 (over Conservatives)
Huddersfield Borough Constituency	Almondbury, Birkby, Dalton, Deighton, Newsome and Paddock.	Barry Sheerman	Labour Party	1983: 3,955 (over Conservatives)

==== 1974 to 1983 ====
Parliamentary constituencies in England and Wales continued to be defined in terms of the boroughs and districts abolished in 1974 until a general redistribution of seats in 1983. Accordingly, Kirklees was divided between seven constituencies, which had first been used in the 1950 general election.

Constituency	Former administrative areas	Member of parliament	Party	Majority
Batley and Morley Borough Constituency	Municipal Borough of Batley; Also included the former Municipal Borough of Morley in the City of Leeds.	Kenneth Woolmer	Labour Party	1979: 5,352 (over Conservatives)
Batley and Morley Borough Constituency	Municipal Borough of Batley; Also included the former Municipal Borough of Morley in the City of Leeds.	Alfred Broughton	Labour Party	October 1974: 8,248 (over Conservatives)
Batley and Morley Borough Constituency	Municipal Borough of Batley; Also included the former Municipal Borough of Morley in the City of Leeds.	Alfred Broughton	Labour Party	February 1974: 7,091 (over Conservatives)
Brighouse and Spenborough Borough Constituency	Municipal Borough of Spenborough; Also included the former Municipal Borough of Brighouse in the Metropolitan Borough of Calderdale.	Gary Waller	Conservative Party	1979: 1,734 (over Labour)
Brighouse and Spenborough Borough Constituency	Municipal Borough of Spenborough; Also included the former Municipal Borough of Brighouse in the Metropolitan Borough of Calderdale.	Colin Jackson	Labour Party	October 1974: 2,177 (over Conservatives)
Brighouse and Spenborough Borough Constituency	Municipal Borough of Spenborough; Also included the former Municipal Borough of Brighouse in the Metropolitan Borough of Calderdale.	Colin Jackson	Labour Party	February 1974: 1,546 (over Conservatives)
Colne Valley County Constituency	Colne Valley Urban District, Holmfirth Urban District, Kirkburton Urban District, Meltham Urban District; Also included the former Saddleworth Urban District in the Metropolitan Borough of Oldham.	Richard Wainwright	Liberal Party	1979: 2,352 (over Labour)
Colne Valley County Constituency	Colne Valley Urban District, Holmfirth Urban District, Kirkburton Urban District, Meltham Urban District; Also included the former Saddleworth Urban District in the Metropolitan Borough of Oldham.	Richard Wainwright	Liberal Party	October 1974: 1,666 (over Labour)
Colne Valley County Constituency	Colne Valley Urban District, Holmfirth Urban District, Kirkburton Urban District, Meltham Urban District; Also included the former Saddleworth Urban District in the Metropolitan Borough of Oldham.	Richard Wainwright	Liberal Party	February 1974: 719 (over Labour)
Dewsbury Borough Constituency	Municipal Borough of Dewsbury, Heckmondwike Urban District, Mirfield Urban District; Also included the former Municipal Borough of Ossett in the City of Wakefield.	David Ginsburg	Labour Party (Defected to the Social Democratic Party in 1981 when he seemed unlikely to be reselected as Labour candidate for the next election.)	1979: 4,381 (over Conservatives)
Dewsbury Borough Constituency	Municipal Borough of Dewsbury, Heckmondwike Urban District, Mirfield Urban District; Also included the former Municipal Borough of Ossett in the City of Wakefield.	David Ginsburg	Labour Party (Defected to the Social Democratic Party in 1981 when he seemed unlikely to be reselected as Labour candidate for the next election.)	October 1974: 6,901 (over Conservatives)
Dewsbury Borough Constituency	Municipal Borough of Dewsbury, Heckmondwike Urban District, Mirfield Urban District; Also included the former Municipal Borough of Ossett in the City of Wakefield.	David Ginsburg	Labour Party (Defected to the Social Democratic Party in 1981 when he seemed unlikely to be reselected as Labour candidate for the next election.)	February 1974: 5,412 (over Conservatives)
Huddersfield East Borough Constituency	Seven wards of the County Borough of Huddersfield: Almondbury, Dalton, Deighton, Fartown, Newsome, North Central, South Central	Barry Sheerman	Labour Party	1979: 3,095 (over Conservatives)
Huddersfield East Borough Constituency	Seven wards of the County Borough of Huddersfield: Almondbury, Dalton, Deighton, Fartown, Newsome, North Central, South Central	J. P. W. Mallalieu	Labour Party	October 1974: 8,414 (over Conservatives)
Huddersfield East Borough Constituency	Seven wards of the County Borough of Huddersfield: Almondbury, Dalton, Deighton, Fartown, Newsome, North Central, South Central	J. P. W. Mallalieu	Labour Party	February 1974: 7,304 (over Conservatives)
Huddersfield West Borough Constituency	Eight wards of the County Borough of Huddersfield: Birkby, Crosland Moor, Lindley, Lockwood, Longwood, Marsh, Milnsbridge, Paddock	Geoffrey Dickens	Conservative Party	1979: 1,508 (over Labour)
Huddersfield West Borough Constituency	Eight wards of the County Borough of Huddersfield: Birkby, Crosland Moor, Lindley, Lockwood, Longwood, Marsh, Milnsbridge, Paddock	Kenneth Lomas	Labour Party	October 1974: 1,364 (over Conservatives)
Huddersfield West Borough Constituency	Eight wards of the County Borough of Huddersfield: Birkby, Crosland Moor, Lindley, Lockwood, Longwood, Marsh, Milnsbridge, Paddock	Kenneth Lomas	Labour Party	February 1974: 630 (over Conservatives)
Penistone County Constituency	Denby Dale Urban District; Remainder of constituency consisted of former urban and rural districts in the Metropolitan Borough of Barnsley and the City of Sheffield	Allen McKay	Labour Party	1979: 9,701 (over Conservatives)
Penistone County Constituency	Denby Dale Urban District; Remainder of constituency consisted of former urban and rural districts in the Metropolitan Borough of Barnsley and the City of Sheffield	Allen McKay	Labour Party	1978 by-election: 5,371 (over Conservatives)
Penistone County Constituency	Denby Dale Urban District; Remainder of constituency consisted of former urban and rural districts in the Metropolitan Borough of Barnsley and the City of Sheffield	John Mendelson	Labour Party	October 1974: 1,364 (over Conservatives)
Penistone County Constituency	Denby Dale Urban District; Remainder of constituency consisted of former urban and rural districts in the Metropolitan Borough of Barnsley and the City of Sheffield	John Mendelson	Labour Party	February 1974: 630 (over Conservatives)

== See also ==
- List of people from Kirklees
