= River Spen =

River in West Yorkshire, England

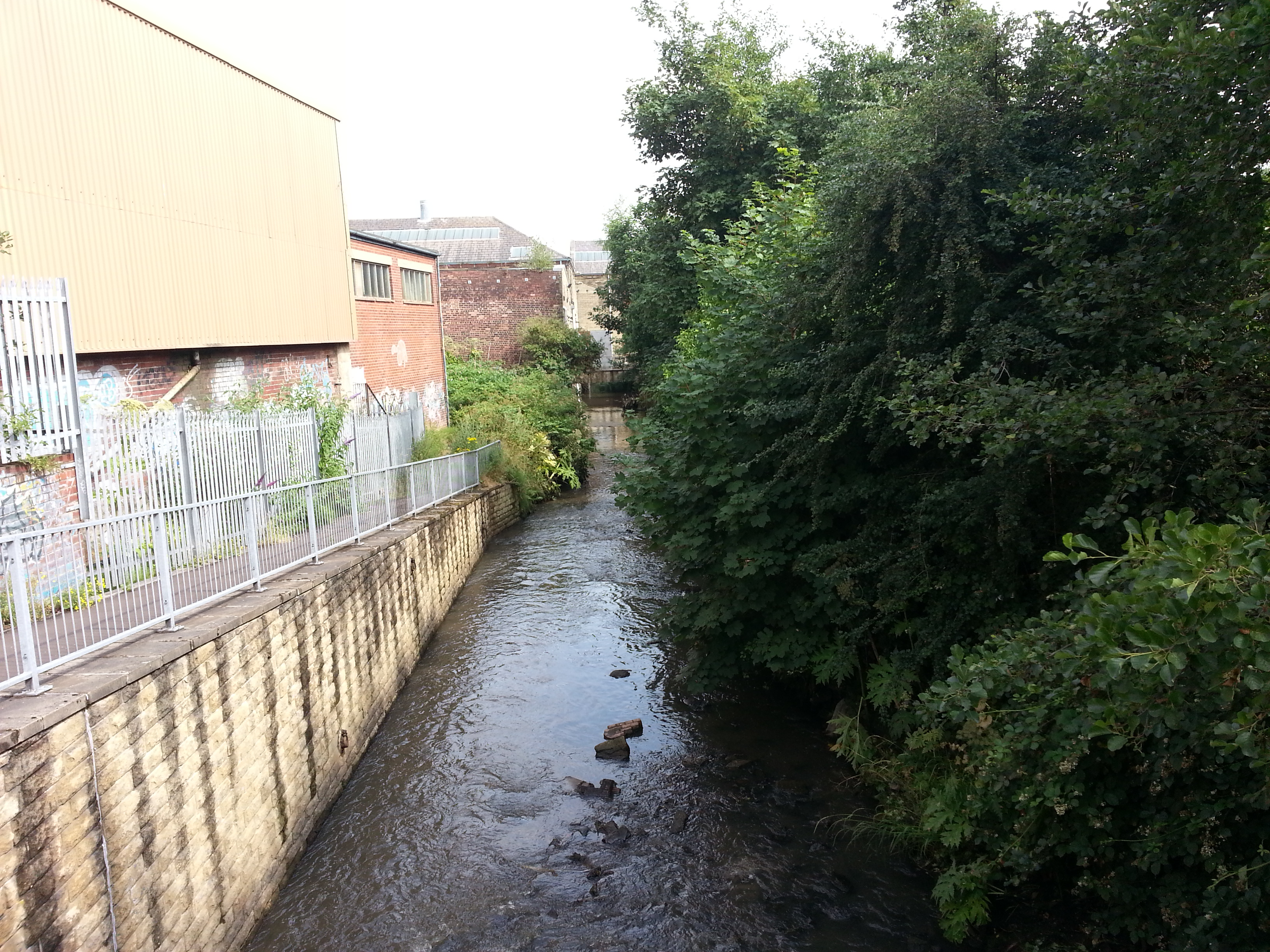
- Spen River running east through Millbridge, Liversedge into Heckmondwike

Location
- Country: England

Physical characteristics
- Source
  - location: Confluence of Hunsworth Beck and Nann Hall Beck in Cleckheaton
  - coordinates: 53°43′59″N 1°43′05″W
  - elevation: 81 metres (266 ft)
- Mouth
  - location: River Calder at Dewsbury
  - coordinates: 53°40′49″N 1°39′4″W
  - elevation: 42 metres (138 ft)
- Length: 8 km (5.0 mi)
- Basin size: 46.3 km^{2} (17.9 sq mi)

The River Spen or Spen Beck, in West Yorkshire, England, is a tributary of the River Calder. It rises north of Cleckheaton, runs through Liversedge and flows into the Calder to the south of Dewsbury at Ravensthorpe. The average rainfall for the river valley of between 600–1000mm per annum when combined with the steep narrow river channel, makes the Spen susceptible to regular flooding. It is referred to in the names of the local parliamentary constituency, Spen Valley and the former local government district of Spenborough.

== Course ==
The River Spen is formed at the confluence of Hunsworth Beck and Nann Hall Beck in Cleckheaton. The river flows south past industrial premises parallel to a dismantled railway line before turning south east on the outskirts of Liversedge. It continues south east through the industrial centre of the town before returning southwards along the edge of Heckmondwike. On the outskirts of Ravensthorpe, the river turns south east again before joining the River Calder.

== Natural history ==
The Spen is mainly an urban waterway and has been polluted by sewage effluent and industrial waste, though levels of pollutants and mine water discharges have decreased since 1999. Heavy rain can cause pollutant levels to rise and the river suffers from tipping and urban litter.

Several non-native species of plant are found along the river including giant hogweed, Himalayan balsam and Japanese knotweed. Bistort, wild garlic, nettles and dandelions are found in abundance in the meadows between the conurbations.

== Leisure ==
The disused railway line adjacent to the riverbank is part of the Spen Valley Greenway (National Cycle Route 66) from Dewsbury to Oakenshaw near Bradford. The greenway is home to a collection of artworks, including A Flock of Swaledale Sheep, constructed from recycled industrial scrap by Sally Matthews, and Rotate by Trudi Entwistle which comprises 40 giant steel hoops set in a circle.

== Lists ==
=== Tributaries ===
- Finching Dike
- Canker Dyke

=== Settlements ===
- Cleckheaton
- Liversedge
- Heckmondwike
- Ravensthorpe

=== Crossings ===
- A643, Cleckheaton
- Thornton Street, Cleckheaton
- A638, Rawfolds Bridge, Cleckheaton
- Cartwright Street, Cleckheaton
- Primrose Lane, Cleckheaton
- Radulf Gardens, Liversedge
- Knowler Hill, Liversedge
- Valley Road, Liversedge
- A62, Liversedge
- A649, Wakefield Road, Liversedge
- Wormald Street, Liversedge
- Union Street, Liversedge
- Beck Lane, Liversedge
- Smithies Bridge, Station Lane, Liversedge
- A644, Huddersfield Road, Ravensthorpe

== Sources ==
- Ordnance Survey Open Data https://www.ordnancesurvey.co.uk/business-government/tools-support/open-data-support
