= Marsden railway station =

Railway station in West Yorkshire, England

Marsden
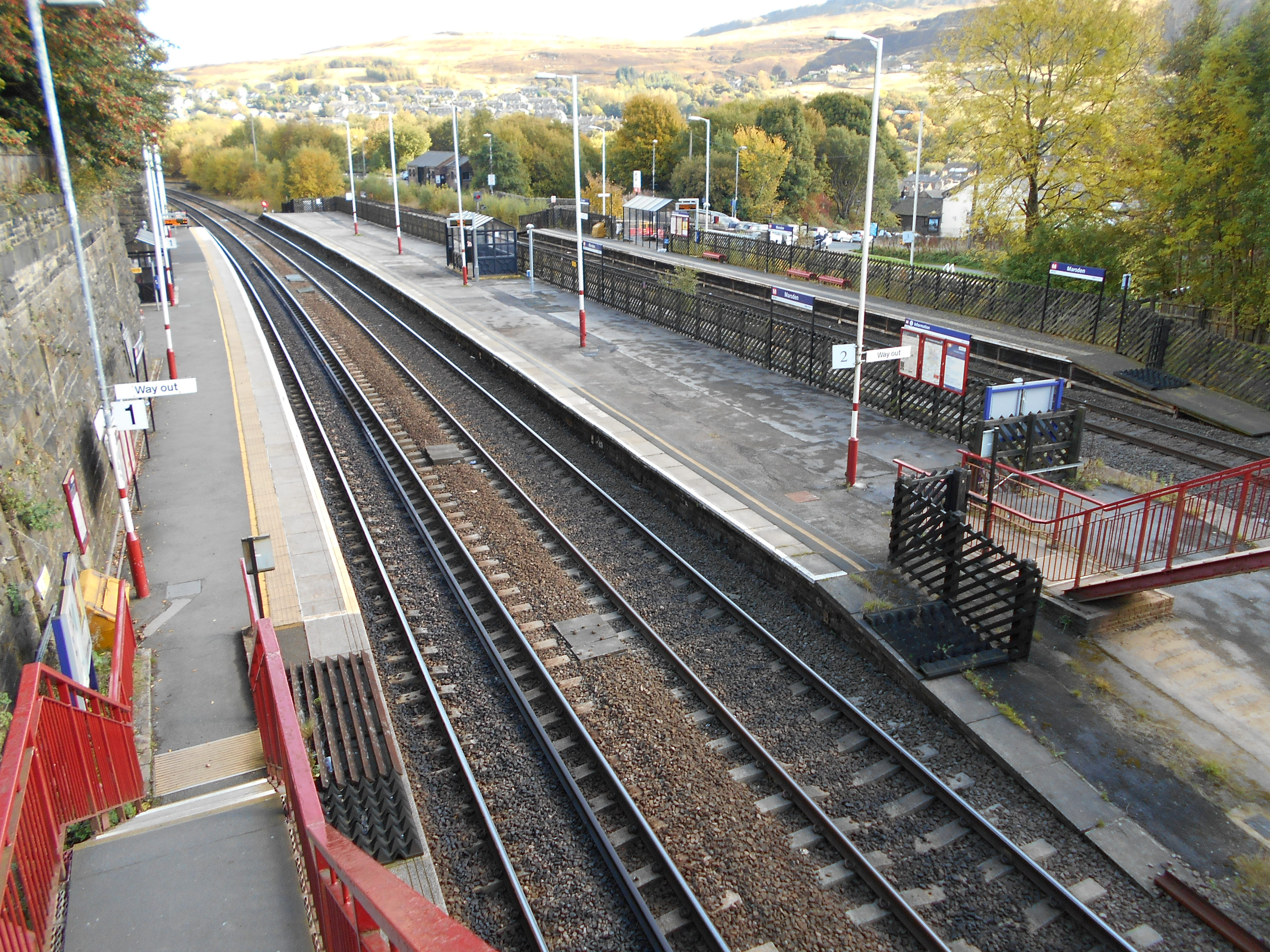
- The view from the road bridge

General information
- Location: Marsden, Kirklees; England
- Coordinates: 53.603230°N 1.930700°W
- Grid reference: SE046118
- Manager: Northern Trains
- Transit authority: West Yorkshire (Metro)
- Platforms: 3

Other information
- Station code: MSN
- Fare zone: 5
- Classification: DfT category F1

History
- Opened: 1 August 1849

Passengers
- 2021/22: ▲0.138 million
- 2022/23: ▲0.184 million
- 2023/24: ▼0.164 million
- 2024/25: ▲0.221 million
- 2025/26: ▲0.240 million
Location
Notes
- Passenger statistics from the Office of Rail and Road

Marsden railway station serves the village of Marsden near Huddersfield in West Yorkshire, England. The station is on the Huddersfield Line, operated by Northern and is about 7 miles (11 km) west of Huddersfield station. It was opened in 1849 by the London & North Western Railway and is the last station before the West Yorkshire boundary with Greater Manchester. The station is operated by Northern Trains, but only TransPennine Express trains call here.

== Description ==
The station has three platforms which have each their own entrance and exit. Platforms 1 and 2 (which were once an island platform) are accessed by separate flights of stairs from the road over bridge which crosses the line to the west of the station. Platform 3 is accessed from the same road by a bridge across the nearby canal. Only platform 3 (which was built on the former Up Goods Loop in the mid-1980s by British Rail) has step-free access to the street. Other than simple shelters on the platforms, there are no station buildings and the station is unstaffed. Train running information can be obtained via digital information screens, timetable posters and telephone.

The station did have two additional platforms up until the mid-1960s (the current platform 2 having an outer face, with the fourth side platform standing where platform 3 is now) when the line was quadruple all the way from Huddersfield to Diggle Junction, but these were decommissioned when the main line was reduced to two tracks in 1966. The station avoided closure in the wake of the 1968 cutbacks that claimed many others on this section of route, but for some years acted as the terminus for local stopping trains from the Leeds direction (hence the provision of signalling that allows trains to start back east from platforms 2 & 3) and had no regular service towards Stalybridge and Manchester.

The station is situated about 0.5 miles (0.8 km) to the east of the entrance to the Standedge rail and canal tunnels. The tunnel entrance, with its exhibition and boat trips, can easily be reached by walking along the towpath of the Huddersfield Narrow Canal, which runs adjacent to the station. The station's former goods yard is now the headquarters of the National Trust's Marsden Moor Estate, and the goods shed contains a public exhibition, Welcome to Marsden, which gives an overview of the area and its transport history.

There was formerly another area of sidings situated to the south of the railway and canal, to the west of the station, which was originally built to accommodate the heavy traffic generated during the building of the reservoirs in the nearby Wessenden Valley. The steeply graded Huddersfield Corporation Waterworks Railway connected these sidings to the reservoir works. The area is now a heavily wooded country park, but an abutment of the long demolished bridge by which the waterworks railway crossed the River Colne can still be found amongst the vegetation.

== Services ==
From Monday to Sunday, Marsden is served by an hourly stopping TransPennine Express service between Manchester Piccadilly and Huddersfield. Since the winter 2024 timetable was introduced, many of these are extended through to Wakefield Kirkgate and York via Castleford.

All other TransPennine Express services pass through at high speed and do not stop.

While Northern Trains manage the station, Northern services do not operate west of Huddersfield and thus do not serve it.

Preceding station	National Rail	Following station
Greenfield	TransPennine Express; North TransPennine; Manchester – Huddersfield	Slaithwaite
	Historical railways	
Diggle; Line open, station closed	London and North Western Railway; Huddersfield Line	Slaithwaite; Line and station open

== 21st Century upgrade ==
As part of the Transpennine Route Upgrade, the station is being modified and the line through it electrified. The section between Stalybridge to Huddersfield is being split up as follows:

- W2b – Stalybridge to Marsden
- W2c – Marsden to Huddersfield
