= Northorpe Higher railway station =

Disused railway station in West Yorkshire, England

Northorpe Higher
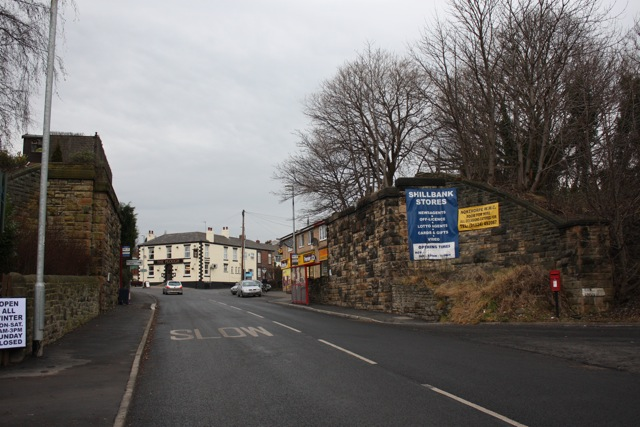
- Bridge abutments on the site of the former station

General information
- Location: Northorpe, West Yorkshire, Kirklees; England
- Coordinates: 53.6836°N 1.6766°W
- Platforms: 2

Other information
- Status: Disused

History
- Original company: London and North Western Railway
- Post-grouping: London, Midland and Scottish Railway

Key dates
- 1 October 1900: Station opens
- 11 July 1921: destroyed by fire
- 1921: rebuilt as Northorpe Higher
- 5 October 1953: Station closes
Location

Northorpe Higher railway station served the Northorpe area of Mirfield, in West Yorkshire, England.

== History ==
Northorpe Station was situated on the north side of Shillbank Lane, with its platforms, buildings and covered access stairs built of wood. On 11 July 1921, a passing Huddersfield goods train started a grass fire at around 6 p.m., which spread to the station buildings, destroying them and damaging the track when the canopy fell. The station was replaced the same year with Northorpe Higher station, this time south of the overbridge over Shillbank Lane. The station buildings were not new, but the former railway buildings at Gildersome East railway station, which were taken down and re-erected at Northorpe.

The station was closed to passengers on 5 October 1953.

Preceding station	Disused railways	Following station
Battyeford	LNWR; Leeds New Line	Heckmondwike Spen
