= Battyeford railway station =

Disused railway station in West Yorkshire, England

Battyeford
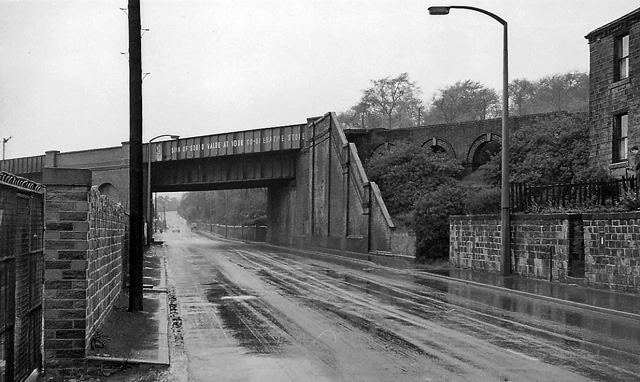
- Site of Battyeford railway station, to the right of the A644.

General information
- Location: Battyeford, Kirklees; England
- Coordinates: 53.6776°N 1.7039°W
- Grid reference: SE196201
- Platforms: 2

Other information
- Status: Disused

History
- Original company: London and North Western Railway
- Post-grouping: LMS

Key dates
- 1 October 1900: Station opened as "Battyeford and Mirfield"
- 2 May 1910: Station renamed "Battyeford"
- 5 October 1953: Station closed
Location

Battyeford railway station served the village of Battyeford in West Yorkshire, England.

== History ==
Built by the London and North Western Railway and opened in 1900, the Leeds New Line linked Huddersfield and Leeds via the Spen Valley. It diverged from the existing LNWR line at Heaton Lodge Junction and passed under the L&YR Manchester Leeds line before crossing the River Calder on a girder bridge and continuing onto the 193 yards (176 m) Battyeford viaduct. Battyeford station was situated at the northern end of the viaduct, with the platforms extending onto the span over Huddersfield road (now the A644). A goods yard and shed were situated on the Leeds side of the station. The station was 4.5 miles (7.2 km) north of Huddersfield, and 14.25 miles (22.93 km) south of Leeds.

The station closed to passenger traffic in October 1953, and the structure has been demolished, with only the embankment north of the A644 remaining. The line remained open for through traffic for almost twelve more years, finally closing completely in August 1965. The goods yard has been used for new housing (Littlemore Grove).

Preceding station	Disused railways	Following station
Bradley	LNWR; Leeds New Line	Northorpe Higher
