= Longwood and Milnsbridge railway station =

Disused railway station in West Yorkshire, England

Longwood and Milnsbridge
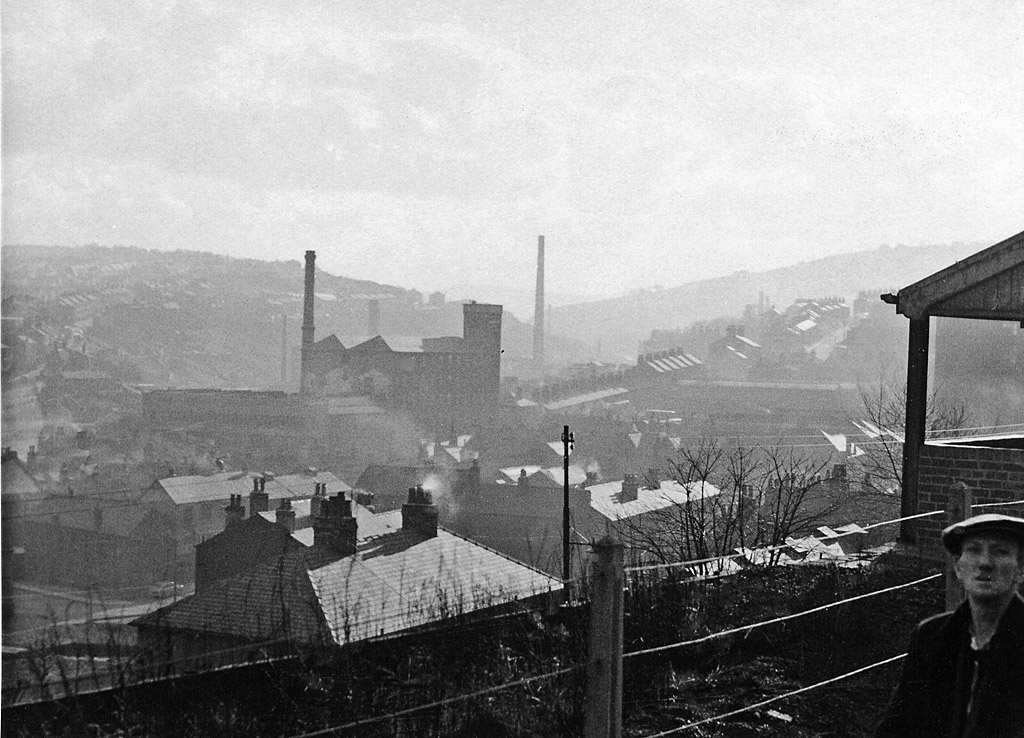
- Industrial scene up Colne Valley from Longwood & Milnsbridge Station

General information
- Location: Huddersfield, Kirklees; England
- Coordinates: 53.64233°N 1.82138°W
- Grid reference: SE119162
- Platforms: 4

Other information
- Status: Disused

History
- Original company: Huddersfield and Manchester Railway
- Pre-grouping: London and North Western Railway
- Post-grouping: London, Midland and Scottish Railway

Key dates
- 1 August 1849: opened
- 7 October 1968: closed
Location

Longwood and Milnsbridge railway station is a former railway station serving the Longwood and Milnsbridge areas of Huddersfield in West Yorkshire, England that was located between the existing Huddersfield and Slaithwaite stations. It closed on 7 October 1968 (along with many other wayside stations on the Huddersfield to Manchester line) as a result of the Beeching Axe.

Preceding station	Disused railways	Following station
Golcar	L&NWR; Huddersfield Line	Huddersfield; Line open, Station open
