= Golcar railway station =

Railway station in West Yorkshire, England

Golcar

General information
- Location: Golcar, Kirklees; England
- Coordinates: 53.63539°N 1.84844°W
- Grid reference: SE101154
- Platforms: 4

Other information
- Status: Disused

Key dates
- 1 August 1849: opened
- 7 October 1968: closed
Location

Golcar railway station is a former railway station serving Golcar in West Yorkshire, England that was located between the existing Huddersfield and Slaithwaite stations. Along with several other stations on this stretch of line, it was closed to passengers on 7 October 1968 – a result of the Beeching Axe. No trace of the station remains, though there have been calls to rebuild the station to serve the village and also neighbouring Milnsbridge.

Preceding station	Disused railways	Following station
Slaithwaite; Line open, Station open	L&NWR; Huddersfield Line	Longwood and Milnsbridge
