= Northorpe =

Northorpe may refer to the following places in England:

- Northorpe, East Riding of Yorkshire, deserted medieval village
- Northorpe, South Holland, a hamlet in the parish of Donington, South Holland, Lincolnshire
- Northorpe, South Kesteven, a hamlet in South Kesteven, Lincolnshire
- Northorpe, West Lindsey, a village in West Lindsey, Lincolnshire
  - Northorpe railway station, a disused railway station that served the village
- Northorpe, West Yorkshire, an area of Mirfield, West Yorkshire
  - Northorpe Higher railway station, a disused station
