= Battyeford =

Village in West Yorkshire, England

Coordinates: 53.681°N 1.712°W

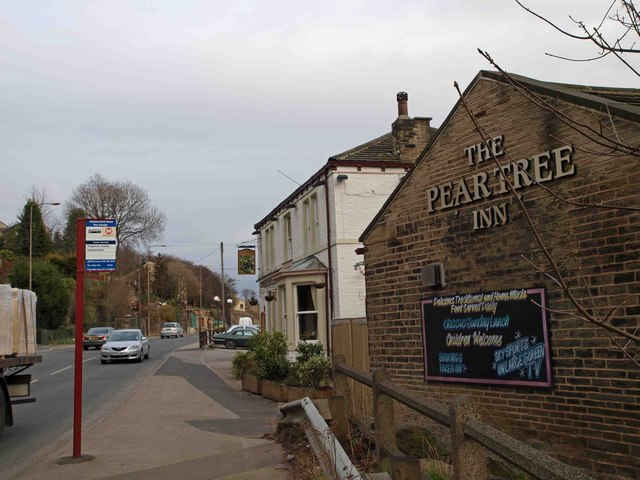
- The Pear Tree Inn, Battyeford

- Location within West Yorkshire
- OS grid reference: SE191205
- Civil parish: Mirfield
- Metropolitan borough: Kirklees
- Metropolitan county: West Yorkshire
- Region: Yorkshire and the Humber
- Country: England
- Sovereign state: United Kingdom
- Post town: MIRFIELD
- Postcode district: WF14
- Police: West Yorkshire
- Fire: West Yorkshire
- Ambulance: Yorkshire
- UK Parliament: Dewsbury

Battyeford is a village which is now part of the town of Mirfield in West Yorkshire, England.

== History ==
From 1900 to 1953 the village was served by Battyeford railway station on the Leeds New Line.

== Governance ==
The village is part of the civil parish of Mirfield, and part of the Mirfield ward of the metropolitan borough of Kirklees. The borough council is a metropolitan borough of West Yorkshire.

== Religious sites ==
Christ the King in Battyeford is an Anglican church and part of the Diocese of Wakefield. It was built in 1973 on the site of the original Christ Church which was built in 1841 and destroyed by fire in 1971.
