= Gildersome Tunnel =

Railway tunnel in England

- Gildersome disused railway tunnel
- Interactive map of Gildersome Tunnel

Overview
- Line: Leeds New Line
- Location: Gildersome, West Yorkshire, England
- Coordinates: 53.7525°N 1.6220°W
- OS grid reference: SE255289
- Status: Closed

Operation
- Work began: 1895
- Opened: 1900
- Closed: 1966

Technical
- Length: 1 mile 571 yards (2.131 km) (Note: The length of the tunnel is disputed between sources. Blower states it to be 1 mile 571 yards (2.131 km), whereas a journal from 1908 states its length as 1 mile 573 yards (2.133 km).)
- No. of tracks: 2
- Track gauge: 4 ft 8 1/2 in (1,435 mm) standard gauge
- Width: 23 feet (7.0 m)
- Grade: 1-in-70 (east to west)

Gildersome Tunnel is a former railway tunnel in Gildersome, West Yorkshire, England. The tunnel opened in 1900 taking the Leeds New Line through Gildersome, and it closed to railway all traffic in 1966. The tunnel has been proposed for re-opening as part of the West Yorkshire mass transit system.

== History ==
The tunnel is 1 mile 571 yards (2.131 km) long, and was built as part of the Leeds New Line between Heaton Lodge Junction (near Mirfield), and Farnley Junction in Leeds. The tunnel crossed the watershed between the Aire and Calder Valleys, and had a gradient of 1-in-70 upwards from east to west. Construction on the tunnel was started in 1895, and it was completed in the summer of 1899, but the line did not open for traffic until 1900. Spoil from building the tunnel was dumped on land at Howden Clough Road in Birstall.

The tunnel was built with double track, and its span was 23 feet (7 m) across. It was horseshoe-shaped, and built entirely of brick with stone portals. The construction of the tunnel necessitated four shafts, three of which were retained for venting steam. The deepest of these was 190 feet (58 m), and they all had a 14-foot (4.3 m) diameter.

The tunnel (and Leeds New Line) were built by the London and North Western Railway as a way to allow their trains to access Leeds without having to use the Lancashire and Yorkshire Railway lines through Mirfield. Gildersome tunnel runs parallel, albeit separated by 1.5 miles (2.4 km), to Morley Tunnel (on the other line between Heaton Lodge and Leeds), and both tunnels run through the same watershed ridge separating the two river valleys of Airedale and Calderdale. In part, the necessity for a new line, was the lack of available land to widen Morley Tunnel, or to build a new tunnel adjacent to the existing Morley Tunnel due to mining subsidence. so the tunnel at Gildersome was built, with as much difficulty and effort as it took to build Morley Tunnel. Both Morley Tunnel and Gildersome Tunnel were flooded in May 1925, with a gang of men having to drain the water away from Gildersome Tunnel.

The line saw a withdrawal of local passenger services in 1953, but expresses used the tunnel up until July 1965, with full closure coming in January 1966. In an open forum with the public, it was suggested that the tunnel could be re-opened as part of the proposed West Yorkshire mass transit system to provide a direct link between Leeds, Cleckheaton and Heckmondwike. However, when the M62 and M621 motorways were built over the formation of the tunnel, over 30,000 cubic yards (23,000 m^{3}) of colliery waste was placed over the western tunnel portal for re-inforcement.

The Great Northern Railway also had a railway line at Gildersome, which ran from Bradford to Wakefield and at a right angle to the LNWR line. This line also had a tunnel at Gildersome (though much shorter) which ran underneath a five-lane crossroads.

=== Accidents ===
- 2 October 1904 - the driver of a goods train from Leeds to Manchester was found dead in the tunnel. He had told the fireman to watch the engine whilst he went out onto the tender, but by the time the train had reached Heckmondwike, he had not returned. It was ruled as an accidental death by the coroner, who surmised that something struck the driver and knocked him off the engine.

== Portal locations ==
- Eastern portal: 53.453°N 1.364°W
- Western portal: 53.444°N 1.380°W
