= Leeds New Line =

Disused railway line in West Yorkshire, England

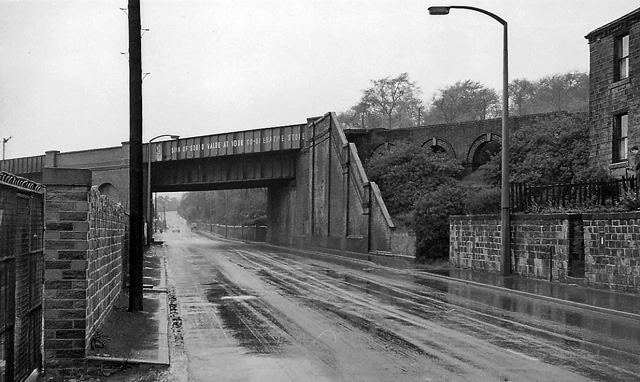
- The site of Battyeford station in 1961

Overview
- Owner: London and North Western Railway
- Locale: West Yorkshire
- Termini: Heaton Lodge junction; Farnley junction
- Stations: 8

History
- Opened: 1 October 1900
- Closed: 1960 to 1990

Technical
- Track gauge: 4 ft 8 1/2 in (1,435 mm)

The Heaton Lodge and Wortley Railway was constructed by the London and North Western Railway, to provide a duplicate route between Huddersfield and Leeds, leaving the existing line at Heaton Lodge Junction, east of Huddersfield and rejoining it at Farnley junction, south west of Leeds. During construction it became known as the Leeds New Line and following nationalisation it was referred to as the Spen Line. Passenger services ceased in the 1950s with full closure in stages between 1960 and 1990.

== History ==
An early casualty of the construction of the railway was Mirfield Cricket Club, who stated in the Report and Balance sheet of the Annual General Meeting held at the Black Bull Hotel on Wednesday 18 December 1895:

Owing to the construction of the Heaton Lodge and Wortley Railway; it became necessary at the end of the season 1894, to select a new ground, lay a new cricket pitch, and erect a new pavilion.

The line was opened on 1 October 1900.

== Route ==
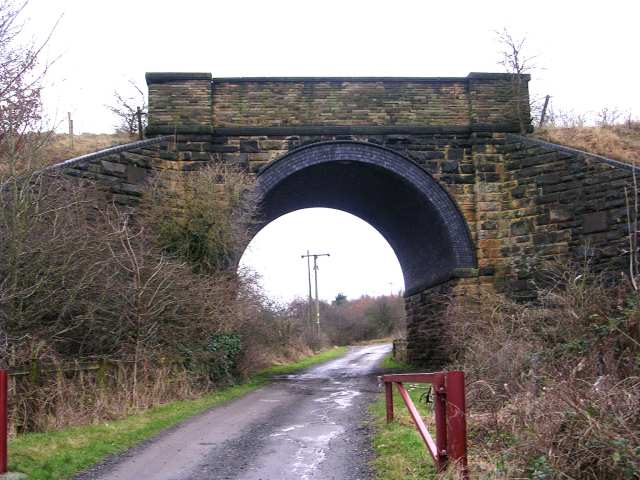
Bridge of the former line between Farnley & Wortley and Gildersome

Leaving the existing LNWR Huddersfield to Leeds line at Heaton Lodge junction, the line curved north, crossing the River Calder and Huddersfield Road on overbridges, to where Battyeford was reached. The line then crossed Mirfield viaduct before entering a cutting crossed by a series of road overbridges. The next station was Northorpe Higher which was originally built of wood, north of the bridge over Shillbank Lane. This station burnt down in 1921 and was replaced by a new station south of the overbridge. The line then ran parallel to the Lancashire and Yorkshire Railway Mirfield Branch, crossing it and the Lancashire and Yorkshire Railway Ravensthorpe Branch before entering Heckmondwike in a series of cuttings and a short tunnel. Heckmondwike Spen was itself in a cutting and was followed by a section of walled cutting with many overbridges, before passing through another cutting and reaching Liversedge Spen. The line then began a gentle curve to the east, passing through Cleckheaton Spen before reaching Gomersal shortly after exiting Gomersal Tunnel. The line then passed through Birstall Town and Gildersome Tunnel before reaching Gildersome East.

== Spen Valley Ringway ==
In 2007 the Spen Valley Ringway was a 3.3-kilometre (2.1 mi) greenway route linking two schools at Littletown and Millbridge. In 2010 it was extended along 500 yards (460 m) of the old Leeds New Line into Heckmondwike. This was part of a diversion of the Spen Valley Greenway whilst it was closed for water main construction and was financed by Yorkshire Water.
