= Birstall Town railway station =

Disused railway station in Birstall, West Yorkshire

Coordinates: 53.7365°N 1.6566°W

Birstall Town
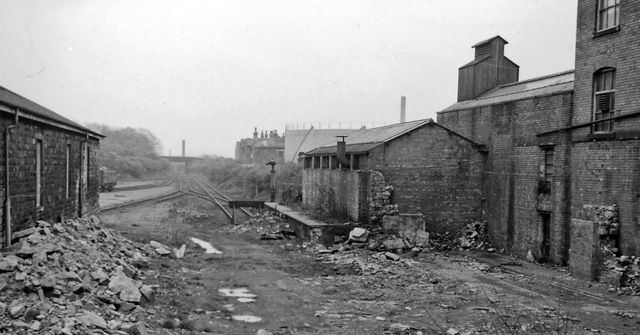
- The site of the station in 1961

General information
- Location: Birstall, West Riding of Yorkshire; England
- Platforms: 2

Other information
- Status: Disused

History
- Original company: London and North Western Railway
- Pre-grouping: London and North Western Railway
- Post-grouping: London, Midland and Scottish Railway; British Railways (London Midland Region)

Key dates
- 1 October 1900: Opened as Upper Birstall
- 8 July 1935: Name changed to Birstall Town
- 1 August 1953: Closed
Location

Birstall Town railway station served the town of Birstall, West Yorkshire, in the historic county of West Riding of Yorkshire, England, from 1900 to 1953 on the Leeds New Line.

== History ==
The station was opened as Upper Birstall on 1 October 1900 by the London and North Western Railway. It had a passenger subway nearby coal sidings. The station's name was changed to Birstall Town on 8 July 1935. Although the station closed on 1 August 1953, the railway still carried the Transpennine expresses until August 1965. Also, goods traffic finished on the same date - August 1965.

== Redevelopment ==
The station area is now an industrial estate. West of the station, the Raikes Lane overbridge has since been bricked up, and the cutting west of the station has been filled in. Going east, the bridge over the A62 Gelderd Road was removed.

The line from Birstall to Gildersome came very close now to the M62 Junction 27 Trading Estate, including Ikea, Showcase Cinemas, et al.

Preceding station	Disused railways	Following station
Gildersome; Line and station closed	Leeds New Line; London and North Western Railway	Gomersal; Line and station closed
