= Huddersfield line =

Inter-regional railway in Northern England

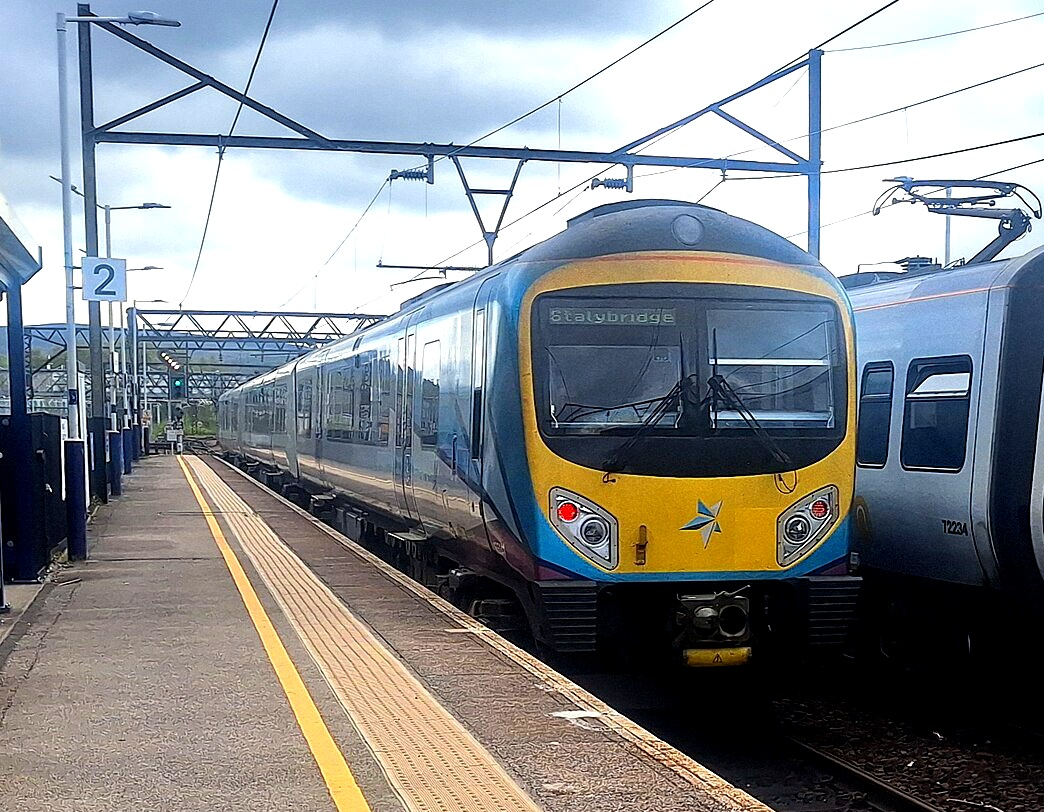
- TransPennine Express Class 185 passing Guide Bridge in 2025

Overview
- Owner: Network Rail
- Locale: West Yorkshire; North West England
- Termini: Manchester Piccadilly Manchester Victoria; Huddersfield

Service
- Operators: TransPennine Express; Northern Trains; DB Cargo UK; GB Railfreight; Freightliner; Direct Rail Services

Technical
- Line length: 49 miles (79 km)
- Track gauge: Standard gauge 4 ft 8 1/2 in (1,435 mm)
Route map
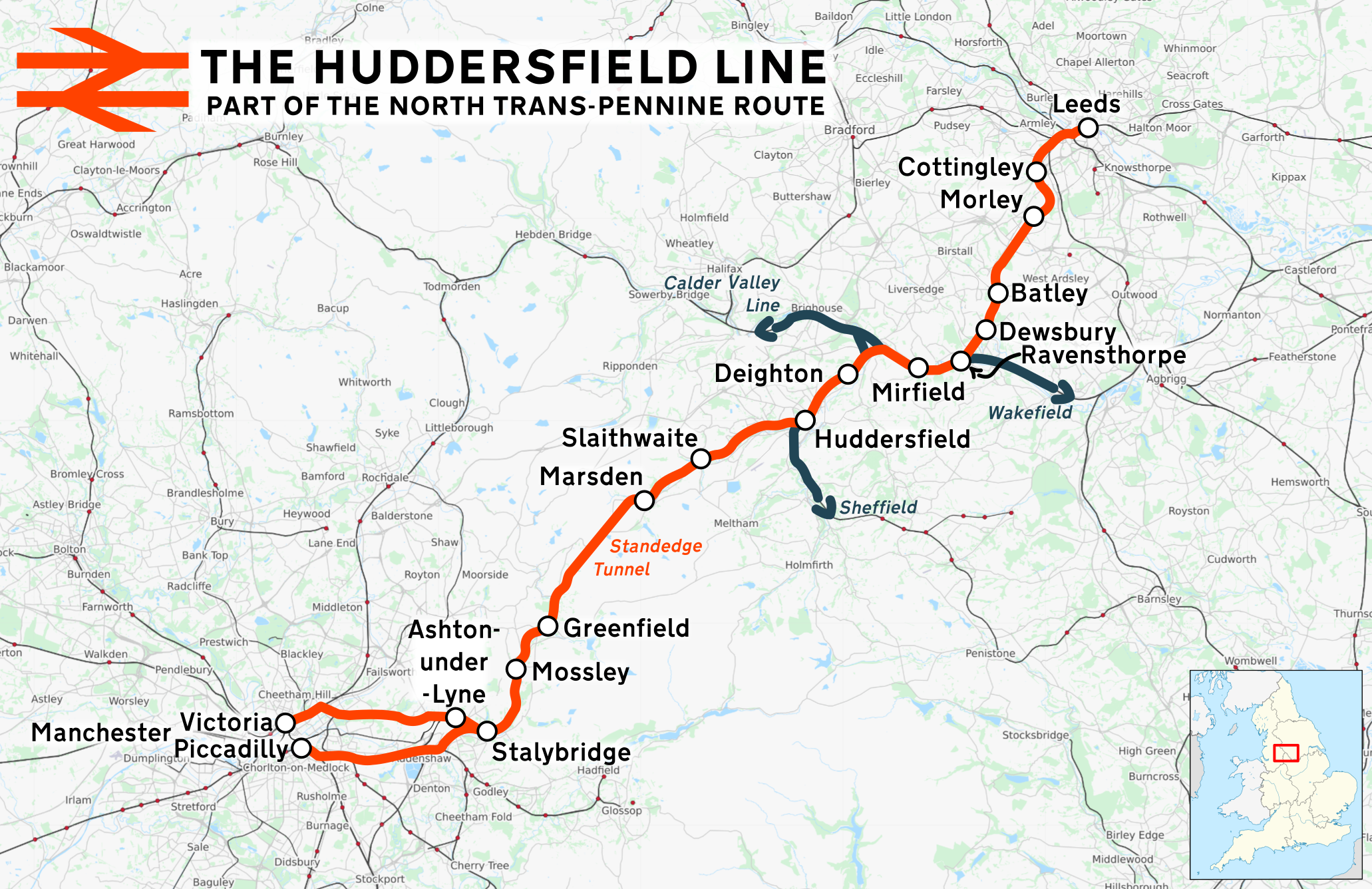
(Click to expand)

The Huddersfield line is the main railway line between the English cities of Leeds and Manchester, via Huddersfield. It is one of the busiest MetroTrain lines. The route travels south-south-west from Leeds through Dewsbury. After a short westward stretch through Mirfield, where it runs on the ex-L&YR section, it continues south-west through Huddersfield, using the Colne Valley to its headwaters. The long Standedge Tunnel, just after Marsden, crosses under the watershed; the majority of the run down to Manchester is in the Tame Valley. From Manchester, services either terminate, or continue to Manchester Airport or Liverpool.

In November 2011, the Government announced that this route would be electrified, to be completed by 2022; however, there have been multiple delays. It is currently subject to the Transpennine Route Upgrade, which is an element of the Integrated Rail Plan for the North and Midlands that was announced in November 2021.

== History ==
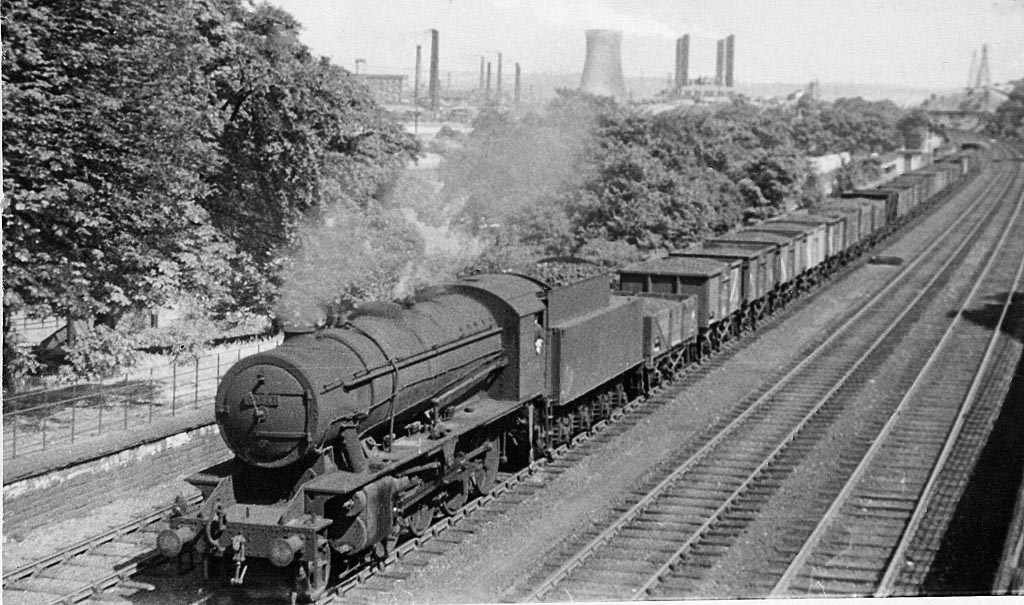
Westbound coal train between Ravensthorpe and Mirfield in 1953

At the time of the 1923 Grouping, most of the route followed by the line was over London and North Western Railway (LNWR) metals; the exception was a short stretch around Mirfield, which was the property of the Lancashire and Yorkshire Railway (L&YR). The first section of the line, between Huddersfield and Stalybridge, was opened by the Manchester, Stockport and Leeds Railway on 1 August 1849. The line became part of the London, Midland and Scottish Railway after 1923.

The route was furnished with two additional tracks in 1894, thus giving four tracks between Stalybridge and Leeds. The loss of traffic through the second half of the 20th century saw these cut back to just two lines and the closure of the Micklehurst (Friezland) loop.

The length of the line between Manchester Victoria and Holbeck Junction at Leeds is 49 miles (79 km), though the Transpennine upgrade work covers the additional section to York which accounts for 76 miles (122 km).

=== Future ===
From spring 2019, the whole route is being upgraded over the course of three control periods extending beyond 2029. Network Rail state that this will include doubling the track in some places and upgrading stations as well as some of the intended Transpennine north railway upgrade. The electrification was to have been curtailed in parts and, as such, the sections between Stalybridge and Huddersfield, with a further section of 12 miles (19 km) east of Leeds, was not to have been electrified. Emphasis was placed on the bi-modal power of the new trains using the line; this necessitated using diesel engines on the unelectrified sections of track.

In August 2019, Network Rail announced a proposal to upgrade the track between Huddersfield and Dewsbury from two tracks to four; at the same time, they also stated their intent to electrify the line between Huddersfield and Leeds. The plans were being put out for public consultation. In July 2020, the then Transport Minister, Grant Shapps, announced a £589 million upgrade to the line, including the reinstatement of an extra two tracks between Huddersfield and Thornhill Junction, to provide four tracks between the two points. These plans were submitted in April 2021 with the expectation of a decision on whether to proceed in 2023.

In March 2022, the first step in the Transpennine Route Upgrade programme was taken. A Transport and Works Act Order to begin works for electrification, track doubling in sections and station upgrades between Dewsbury and Huddersfield was submitted; approval was expected in early 2023. The TRU is an element of the Integrated Rail Plan for the North and Midlands that was announced in November 2021. This proposal includes full electrification of the Huddersfield line and, as well as the track quadrupling between Huddersfield and Westtown (Dewsbury), a grade-separated junction at Thornhill L.N.W. Junction, close to Ravensthorpe.

== Route details ==
Metro (West Yorkshire) pre-paid tickets and concessionary fares are available between Leeds and Marsden. Transport for Greater Manchester (TfGM) fares are available for the Greenfield-Manchester section. Several of the intermediate stations listed were closed in the 1960s, as a result of the Beeching Axe, including many of those between Huddersfield and Manchester. All stations that are still open are in bold:

=== Leeds–Huddersfield ===
- **Leeds**
- Copley Hill Goods
- Farnley & Wortley
- **Cottingley** (Leeds)
- White Rose, due to open in 2027
- Churwell
- **Morley**
- **Batley**
- Staincliffe and Batley Carr
- Dewsbury: previously Dewsbury (Wellington Road)
- **Ravensthorpe** was named Ravensthorpe and Thornhill
  - just after the station is Thornhill Junction with the L&YR. Trains from Wakefield (Westgate and Kirkgate railway stations) join the Huddersfield line here, giving connections from the Pontefract, Hallam and Wakefield lines.
- **Mirfield** L&YR junctions here to Low Moor and Halifax (the Caldervale Line): the service from the Huddersfield Line operates to **Brighouse**
- Heaton Lodge/Heckmondwike Junctions return the route to the ex-LNWR line
- Bradley
- **Deighton**
- Huddersfield Viaduct
- Huddersfield: served by the Caldervale and Penistone lines. The railway station here was LNWR/L&YR joint owned.

=== Huddersfield–Stalybridge ===
- here is Springwood Tunnel and Springwood Junction for the trains on the Penistone line
- Longwood and Milnsbridge
- Golcar
- **Slaithwaite**
- **Marsden**
- Standedge Tunnel: three parallel tunnels (two single-line and one double) 5,340 yards (4,880 m) in length
- Diggle
- Diggle Junction with line to Stalybridge via Friezland
- Saddleworth
- Moorgate (only served by Delph Donkey services)
- **Greenfield**
- **Mossley**
- **Stalybridge**

=== Stalybridge-Manchester Victoria and Manchester Exchange ===
- **Ashton-under-Lyne**
- Droylsden
- Clayton Bridge
- Park
- Miles Platting
- **Manchester Victoria**
- Manchester Exchange: opened by the LNWR and acted as the terminus for a vast majority of services until its closure in 1969, particularly all-stopping trains.

=== Stalybridge-Manchester Piccadilly ===
- shared with the former Woodhead Line and present-day Glossop and Hope Valley lines to Manchester Piccadilly
- **Manchester Piccadilly**

== Services ==
TransPennine Express (TPE) operate the majority of the passenger services over the line, as it is the core line linking the North West with Yorkshire and the North East. Since privatisation in the 1990s, local services on the route have been operated by the Northern franchise (Arriva Trains Northern, Northern Rail, Arriva Rail North and, since 2020, Northern Trains). The first incarnation, Arriva Trains Northern, also operated the express services between Liverpool, Manchester, Leeds, York, Middlesbrough and Newcastle before the Strategic Rail Authority spun the express train services off into a separate franchise operated by First TransPennine Express and, since 2016, by TransPennine Express.

At the May 2018 timetable change, the Northern services calling at the smaller stations on the section between Greater Manchester and Huddersfield were transferred to TPE; they were combined into an hourly Manchester Piccadilly to Leeds service. This also saw many of the TPE services diverted away from the Guide Bridge to Manchester Piccadilly corridor, so that through trains could use the newly opened Ordsall Chord. However, Northern still operate local services from Huddersfield to Sheffield, Leeds (via Bradford Interchange) and Wakefield. Due to the change of line on the through Manchester services, the Liverpool trains no longer run on the line through Warrington Central, but travel via Newton-le-Willows instead.

Six trains per hour provided by TPE in both directions run on the Huddersfield line between Stalybridge in Greater Manchester and Leeds:

- Liverpool Lime Street to Newcastle (via Manchester Victoria)
- Liverpool Lime Street to Scarborough (via Manchester Victoria)
- Manchester Airport to Newcastle (via Manchester Piccadilly and Manchester Victoria)
- Manchester Airport to Middlesbrough (via Manchester Piccadilly and Manchester Victoria)
- Manchester Piccadilly to Hull
- Manchester Piccadilly to Leeds

== Ale trail ==
An ale trail has become popular along the route owing to a large number of easily accessed and nationally acclaimed pubs along the route; this includes pubs on the station platforms at Dewsbury, Huddersfield and Stalybridge. The following are of particular interest:

- West Riding Licensed Refreshment Rooms: located on the platform at Dewsbury station, 2006 runner up CAMRA National Pub of the Year)
- The Kings Head, formerly known as The Station Tavern, in the east wing of Huddersfield station
- The Head of Steam: in the west wing of Huddersfield station
- The Commercial, The Shoulder of Mutton and The Hideaway Crafthouse in Slaithwaite
- Riverhead, Marsden: with the Riverhead Brewery in the basement, in the town a little down from the station and tunnels
- Station Buffet at Stalybridge: an original Victorian station buffet with marble counter, on the platform at Stalybridge station)

The trail featured on the BBC's Oz and James Drink to Britain programme and consequently became very popular for drinkers in Manchester and Leeds. This has prompted some concerns over anti-social behaviour in the villages along the trail.
