= Hoorn–Medemblik heritage railway =

Heritage railway in the Netherlands

Museum steam tram Hoorn-Medemblik
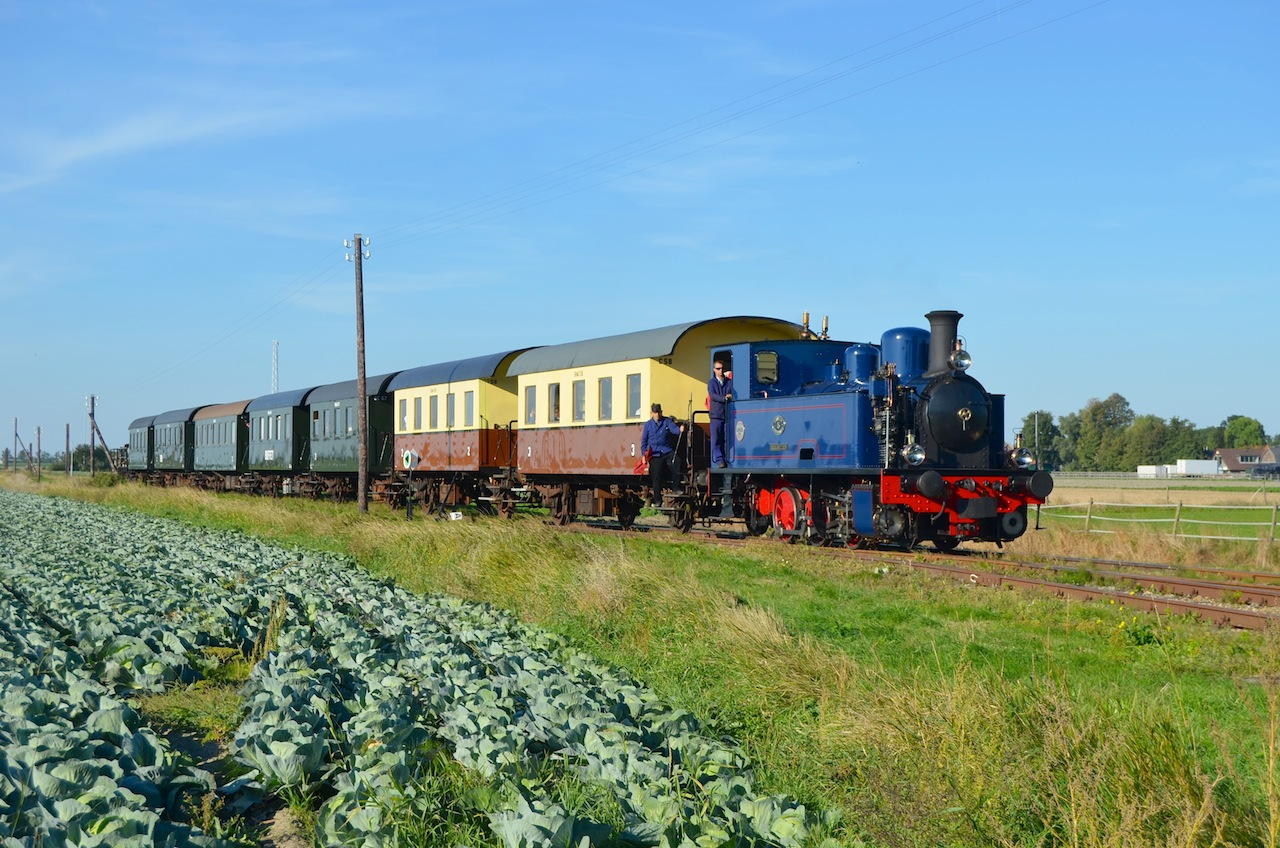
- Loco SHM 5 with local railway carriages on the way in Twisk
- Coordinates: 52.645555555556°N 5.0547222222222°E
- Connections: Nederlandse Spoorwegen

Commercial operations
- Built by: Locaalspoorwegmaatschappij Hollands Noorderkwartier
- Original gauge: 1,435 mm (4 ft 8 1/2 in) standard gauge
- Original electrification: None

Preserved operations
- Length: 20 km (12.4 mi)
- Preserved gauge: 1,435 mm (4 ft 8 1/2 in)

Commercial history
- Opened: 3 November 1887
- Closed to passengers: from 1 January 1936 to 29 May 1940
- Closed: 5 January 1941

Preservation history
- 23 May 1968: Reopen

The Hoorn–Medemblik heritage railway operated by the Museumstoomtram Hoorn Medemblik is a heritage railway in the Netherlands. It runs from Hoorn to Medemblik, a distance of about 20 km (12.4 mi).

== History ==
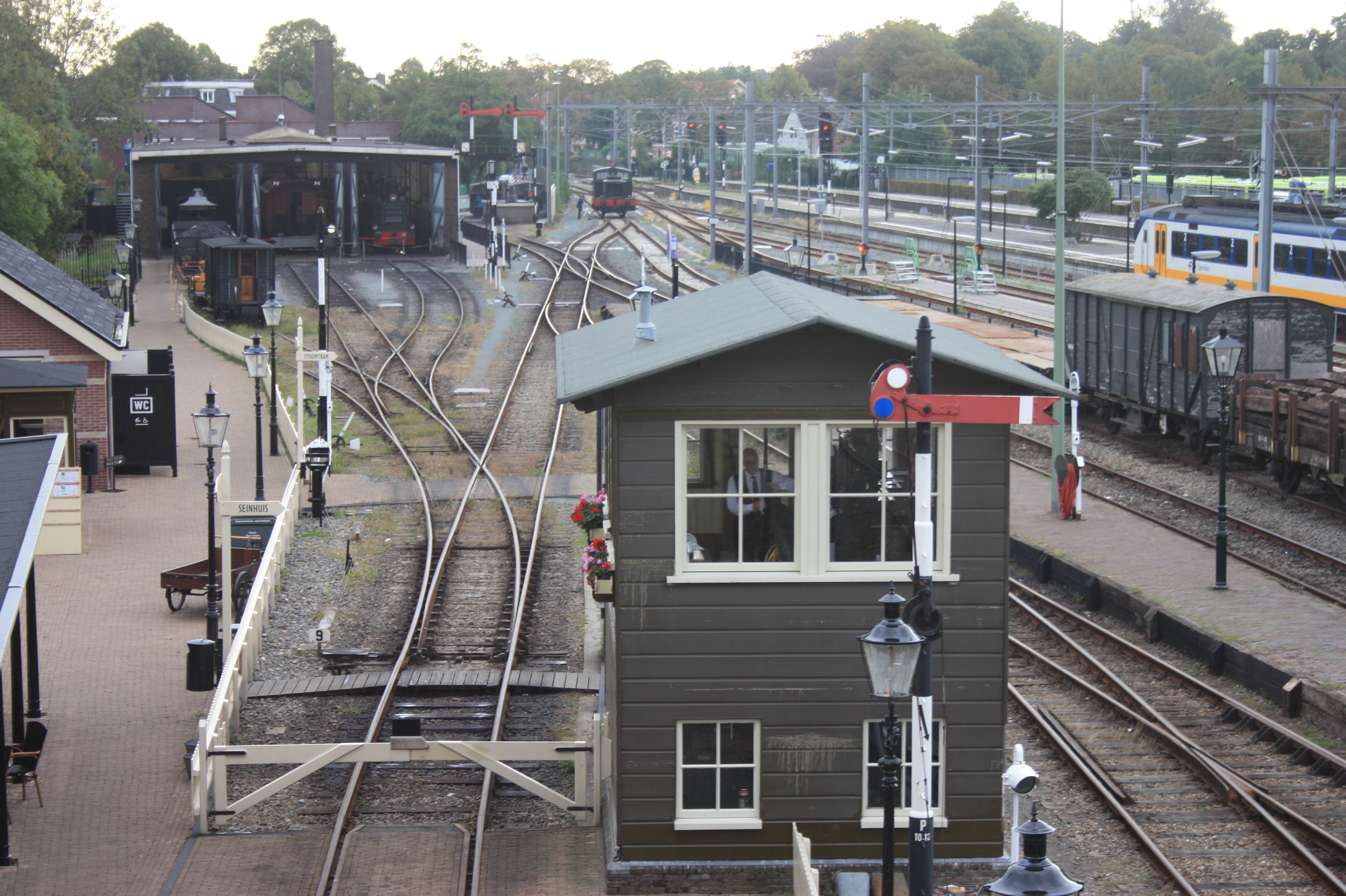
Signal hut and sidings, Hoorn Heritage Railway

The original railway line was operated by Locaalspoorwegmaatschappij Hollands Noorderkwartier (1884 - 1935). The line was opened on 3 November 1887. The track followed a circuitous route to reduce the amount of land that had to be compulsorily purchased. The line used steam traction; diesel traction being introduced in 1929.

The line was closed to passenger services from 1 January 1936 to 29 May 1940.

On 5 January 1941 the line was permanently closed to passenger services; as was the railway station in Medemblik.

== Heritage railway ==
Today, the railway is operated as a tourist attraction. The centrepiece of its collection is the former Nederlandse Spoorwegen locomotive 7742 Bello, the only preserved light steam engine in the Netherlands. Other steam locomotives in running order include three tramway engines, two of which are enclosed tram engines (steam dummies). The remaining ones are: three industrial engines; a German engine which is rebuilt as a replica of a Dutch railway shunting engine (of a series of which several also served on steam tramways); and a locomotive of industrial type which served at a steam tram company in Zuid-Holland, still awaiting restoration. One of the industrial locomotives is on a long-term loan to Museum Buurtspoorweg.

Seven of the ten steam locomotives are official Dutch railway monuments.

NS 7742 and the two enclosed tram engines are in regular use: Bello mainly in the peak season afternoon train. The regular 10.40 am train is pulled by tramloco LTM 26. The two steam dummies mainly in the peak season (Tue/Wed/Thu).

Eight steam tram carriages are in regular service, as well as several steam tram goods wagons.

Bello and the three tramway engines originate from the provinces North Holland, South Holland and Limburg. The serviceable steam tram carriages originate from the provinces Friesland, Gelderland, North Holland, South Holland and Zeeland.

The livery and presentation of the cars is as they were in 1926.

The station is twinned with the Bluebell Railway in England. The ride between Hoorn and Medemblik is often combined by tourists with a trip from Medemblik to Enkhuizen by boat.

On the disused side of platform 2 of Huddersfield railway station in northern England, an old carriage is bolted to the ground, and set in its window is a Dutch plaque commemorating 100 years of Stoomtram Hoorn - Medemblik.

== Film ==
The railway was used as film location for the 1979 movie The Riddle of the Sands: the station building of 'Emden' was in fact Medemblik, and Twisk was used to represent 'Bensersiel'.

== Video of locomotive 7742 in action ==
Locomotive 7742 is featured in a video by the Netherlands music group BZN as they perform 'Poor Old Joe'.

https://www.youtube.com/watch?v=R8xn1XJTzw4

== Route ==
Distance (km)	Station name
	Hoorn
2	Westerblokker
4	Zwaag
5	Zwaagdijk
6	Wognum- Nibbixwoud
7	Wijzend
9	Benningbroek- Sijbekarspel
10	Abbekerk- Lambertschaag
14	Midwoud- Oostwoud
16	Twisk
18	Opperdoes
19	Opperdoes Oosteinde
20	Medemblik

Stations in italics have been restored.

== Gallery ==
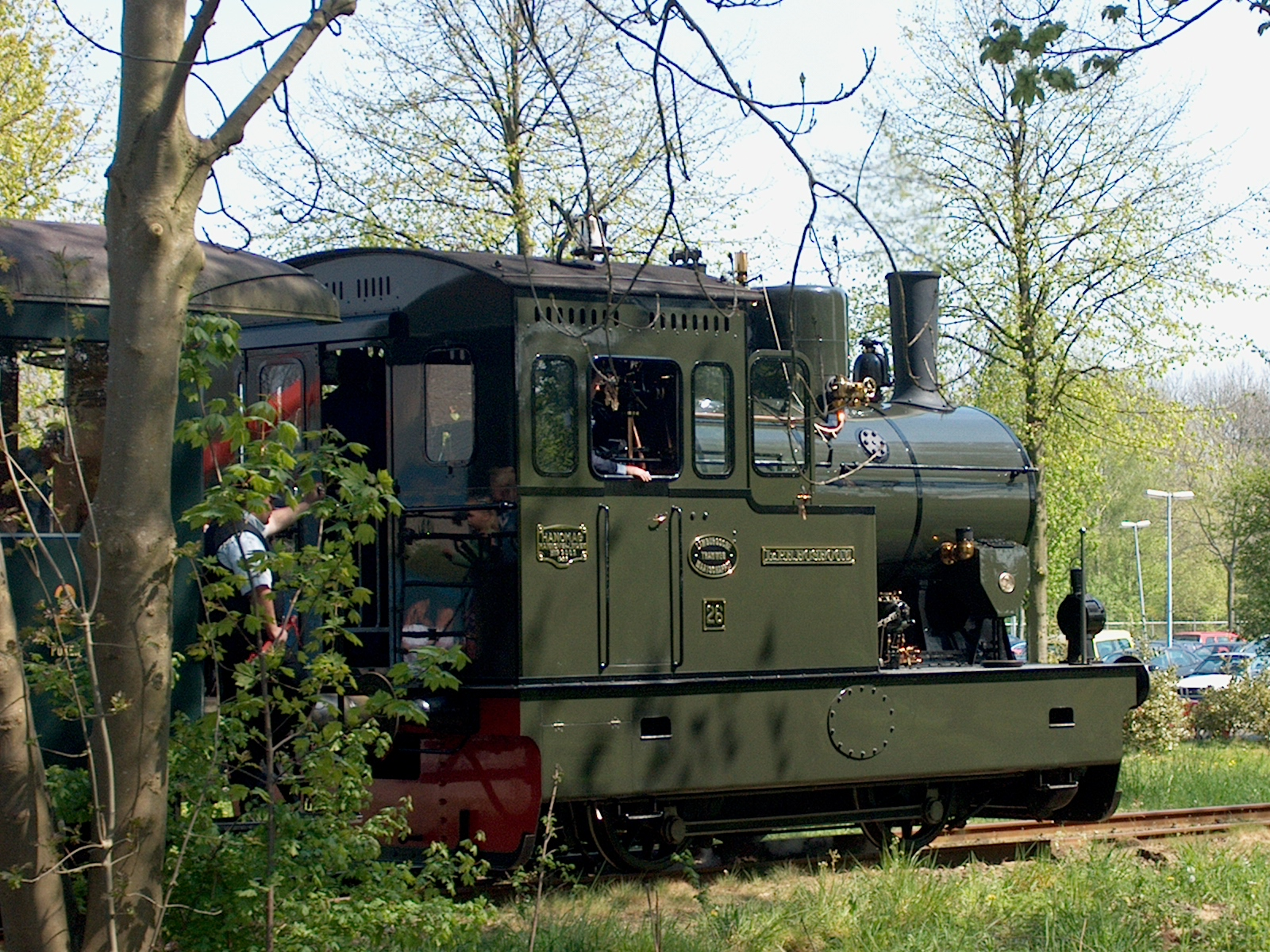
Loc 26 - "Ir. P.H. Bosboom"

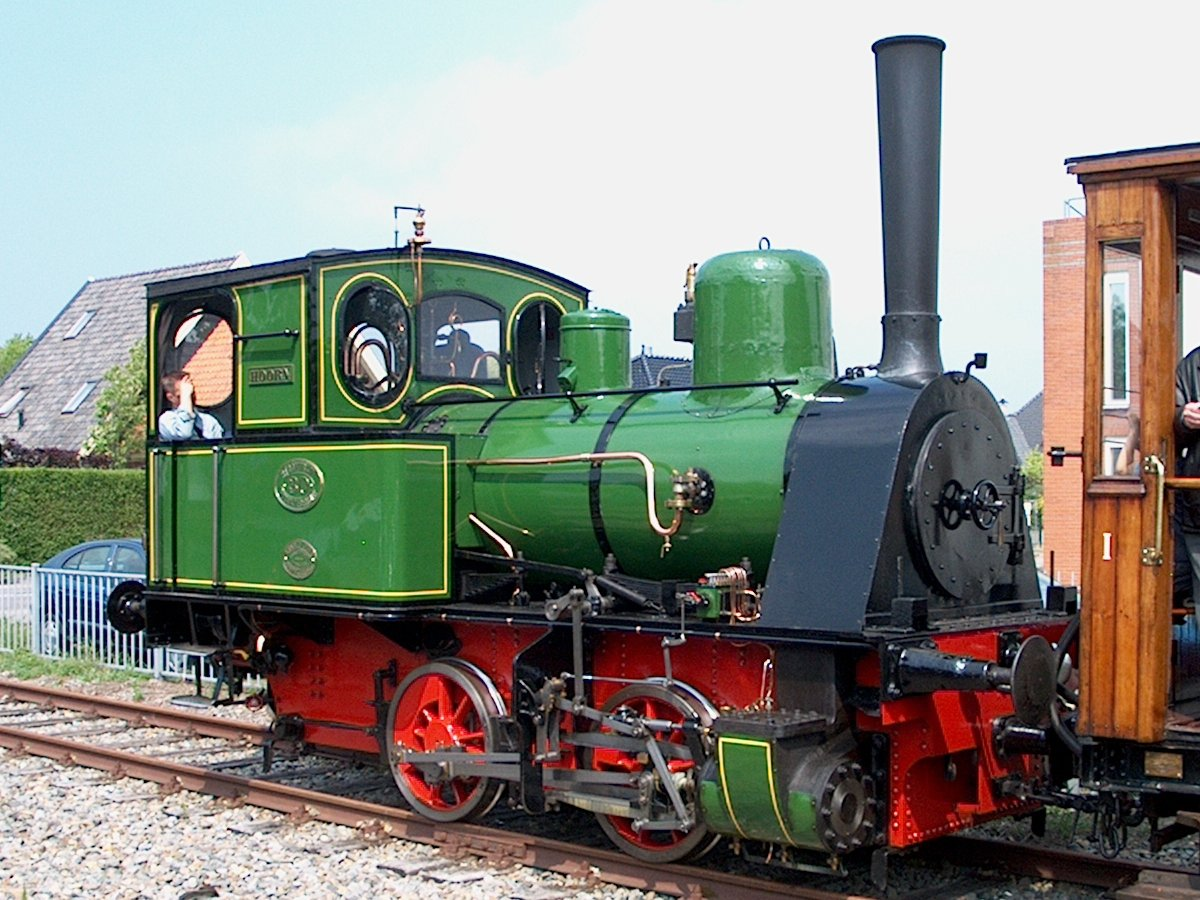
Loc 30 - "Hoorn"

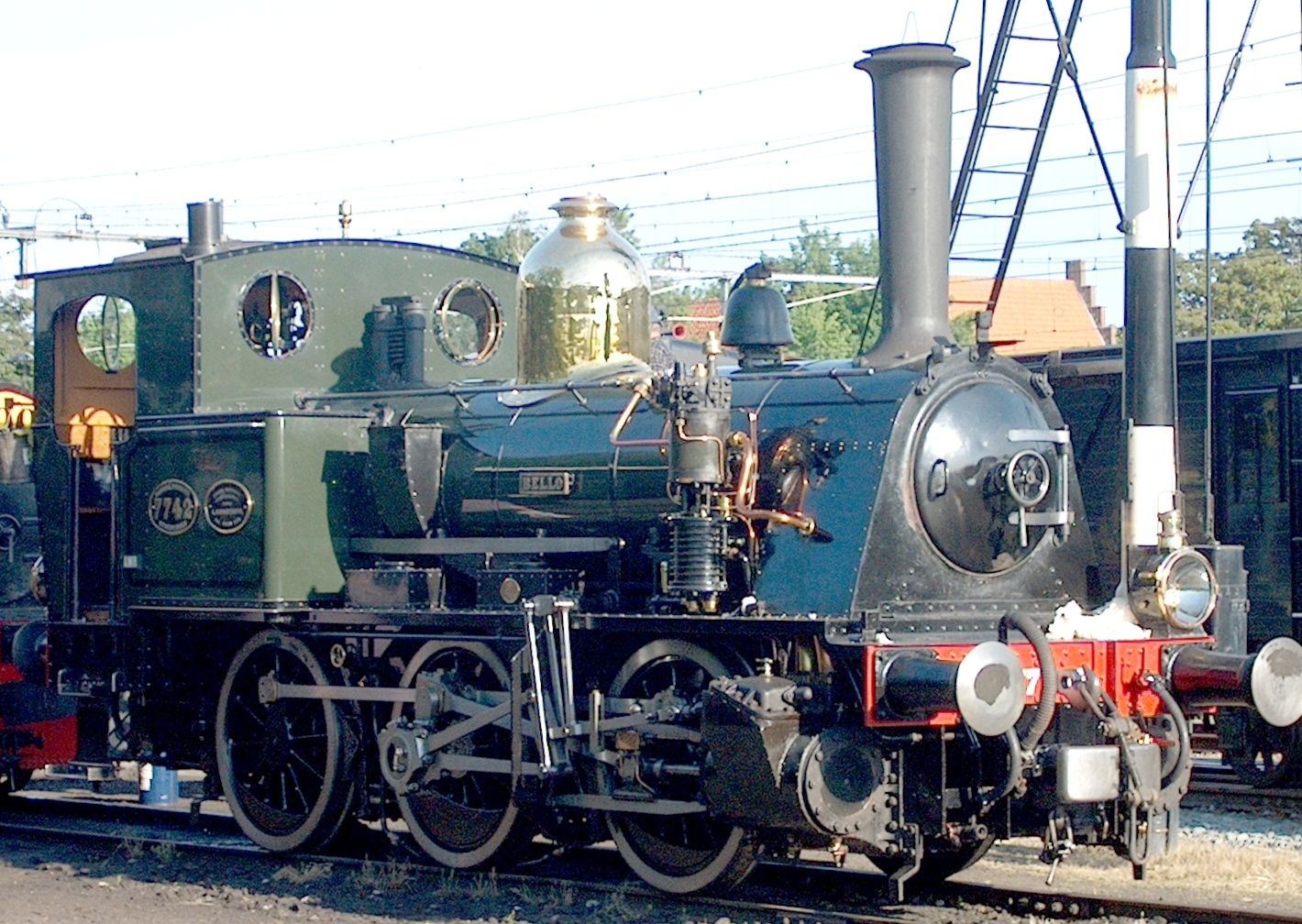
NS 7742 "Bello"

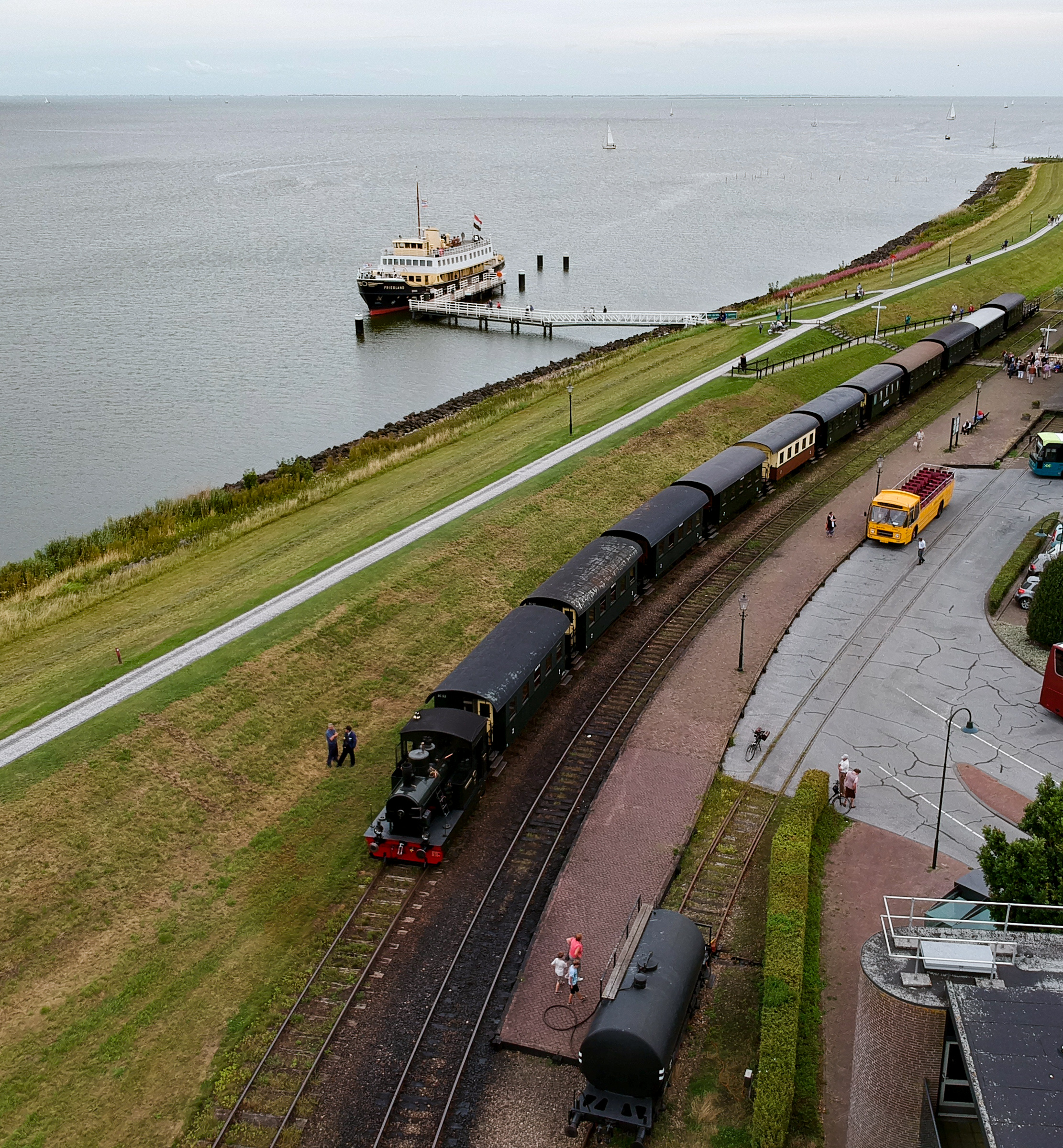
Train with "Friesland" museum ship

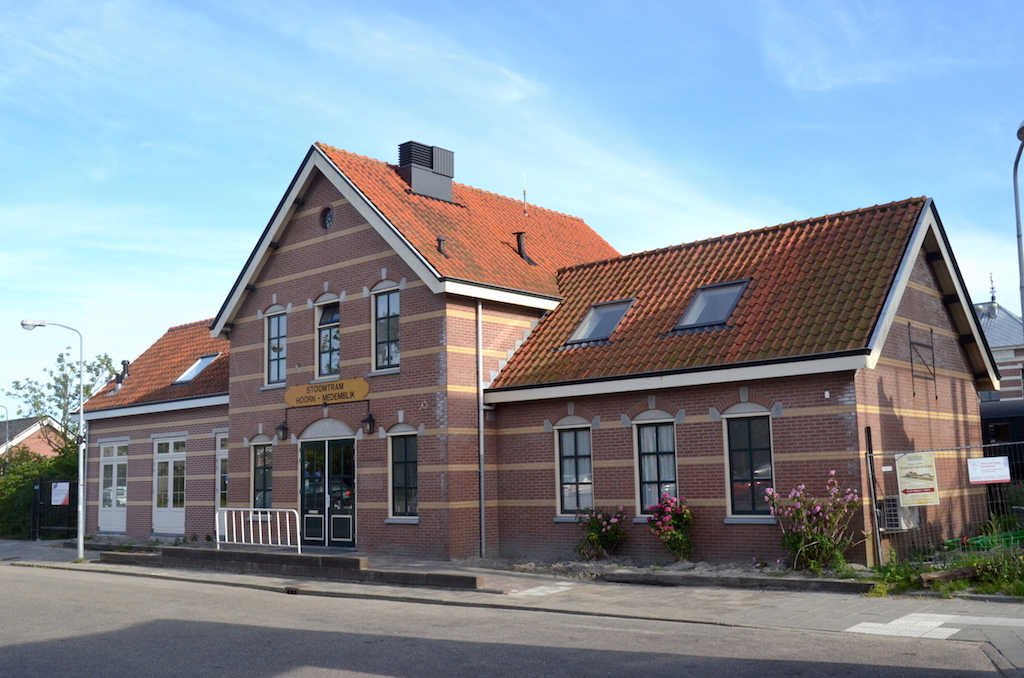
Tramstation Hoorn; july 2015.

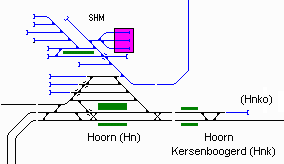
Track layout at Hoorn (HM in blue, NS in black).

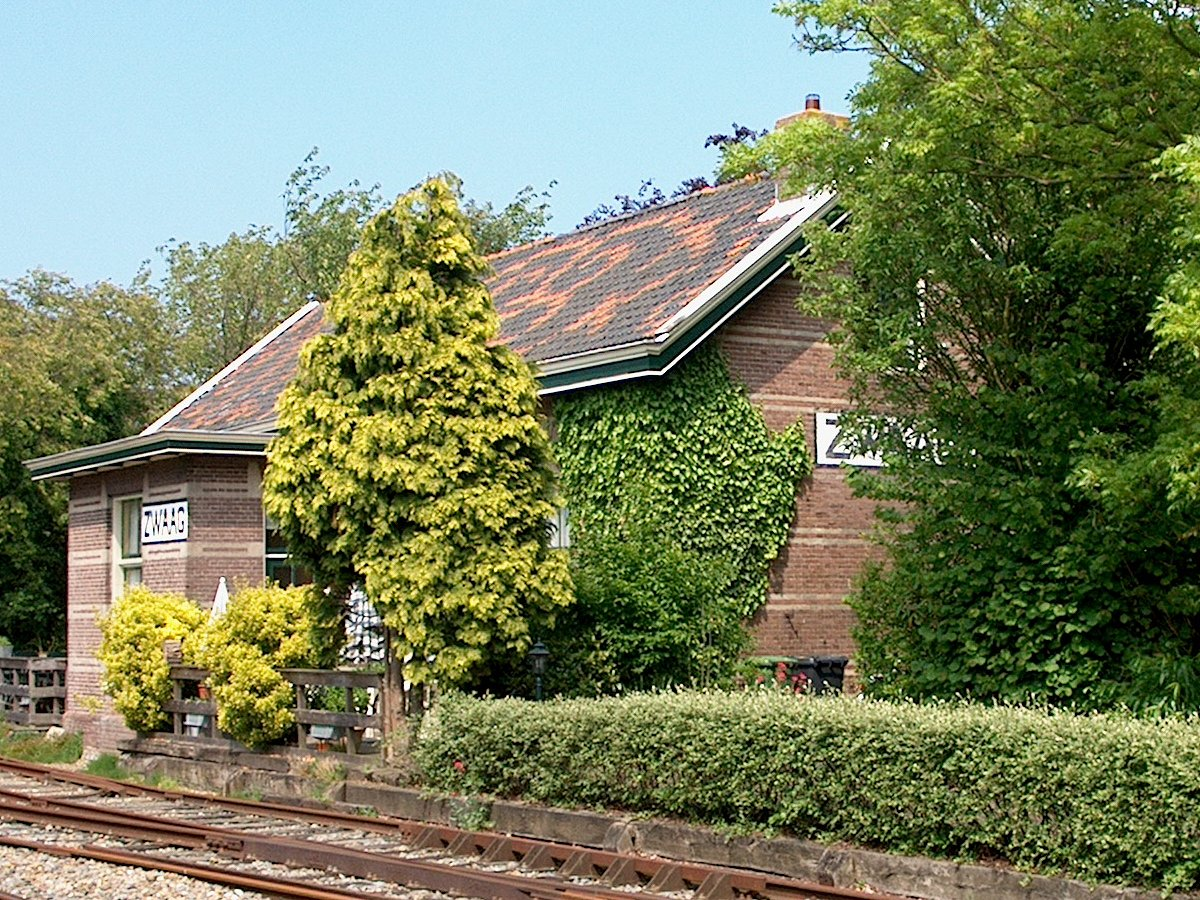
Station Zwaag

== See also ==
- List of heritage railways
- NS_7700
