= Cleckheaton Spen railway station =

Disused historical railway station in Cleckheaton, West Yorkshire

Cleckheaton Spen

General information
- Location: Cleckheaton, West Yorkshire; England
- Coordinates: 53.7249°N 1.7038°W
- Grid reference: SE196254
- Platforms: 2

Other information
- Status: Disused

History
- Original company: London and North Western Railway
- Pre-grouping: London and North Western Railway
- Post-grouping: London, Midland and Scottish Railway; British Railways (London Midland Region)

Key dates
- 1 October 1900: Opened as Cleckheaton
- 2 June 1924: Name changed to Cleckheaton Spen
- 5 January 1953: Closed
Location

Cleckheaton Spen railway station served the town of Cleckheaton, West Yorkshire, England, from 1900 to 1953 on the Leeds New Line. It is one of two disused stations in Cleckheaton, the other being Cleckheaton Central.

== History ==
The station was opened as Cleckheaton on 1 October 1900 by the London and North Western Railway. It had a large goods yard with a cattle dock and a warehouse. Access was controlled by two signal boxes. The station's name was changed to Cleckheaton Spen on 2 June 1924. It closed on 5 January 1953, except for occasional excursions.

Preceding station	Disused railways	Following station
Gomersal; Line and station closed	Leeds New Line; London and North Western Railway	Liversedge Spen; Line and station closed
