= Gomersal railway station =

Disused railway station in Gomersal, West Yorkshire

Gomersal
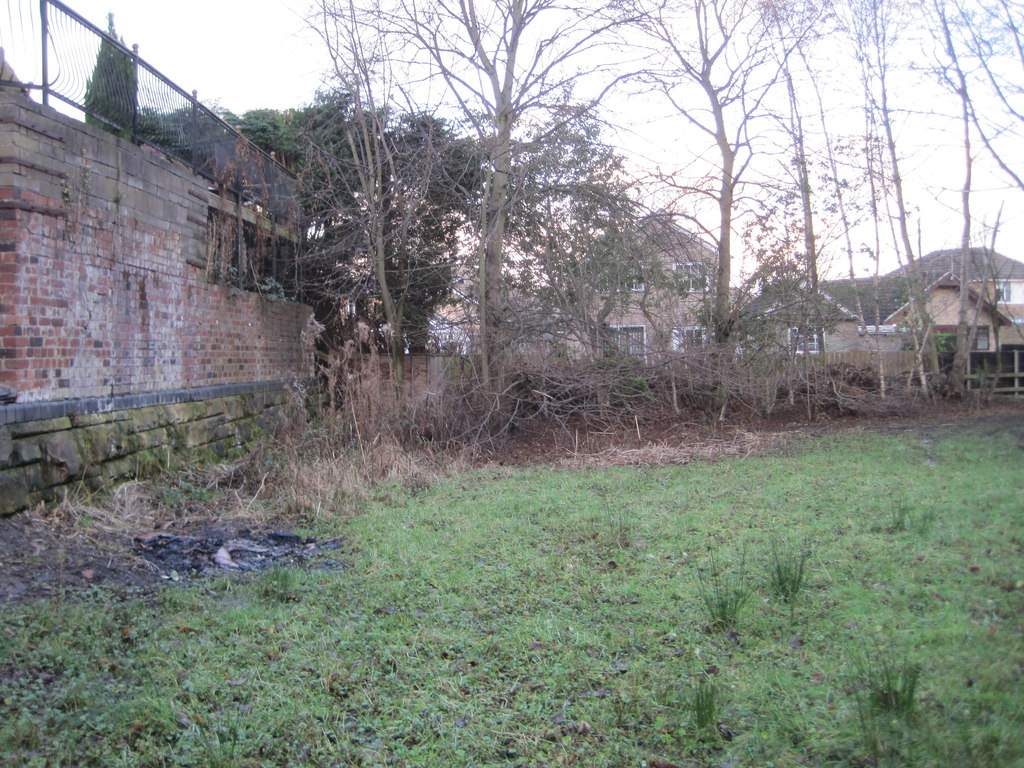
- The site of the station in 2013

General information
- Location: Gomersal, West Yorkshire; England
- Coordinates: 53.7364°N 1.684°W
- Grid reference: SE209267
- Platforms: 2

Other information
- Status: Disused

History
- Original company: London and North Western Railway
- Pre-grouping: London and North Western Railway
- Post-grouping: London, Midland and Scottish Railway; British Railways (London Midland Region)

Key dates
- 1 October 1900: Opened
- 5 October 1953: Closed
Location

Gomersal railway station served the town of Gomersal, West Yorkshire, England, from 1900 to 1953 on the Leeds New Line.

== History ==
The station was opened on 1 October 1900 by the London and North Western Railway. It closed on 5 October 1953. Most of the site is now a road.

Preceding station	Disused railways	Following station
Birstall Town; Line and station closed	Leeds New Line; London and North Western Railway	Cleckheaton Spen; Line and station closed
