= Churwell railway station =

Disused railway station in West Yorkshire, England

Churwell
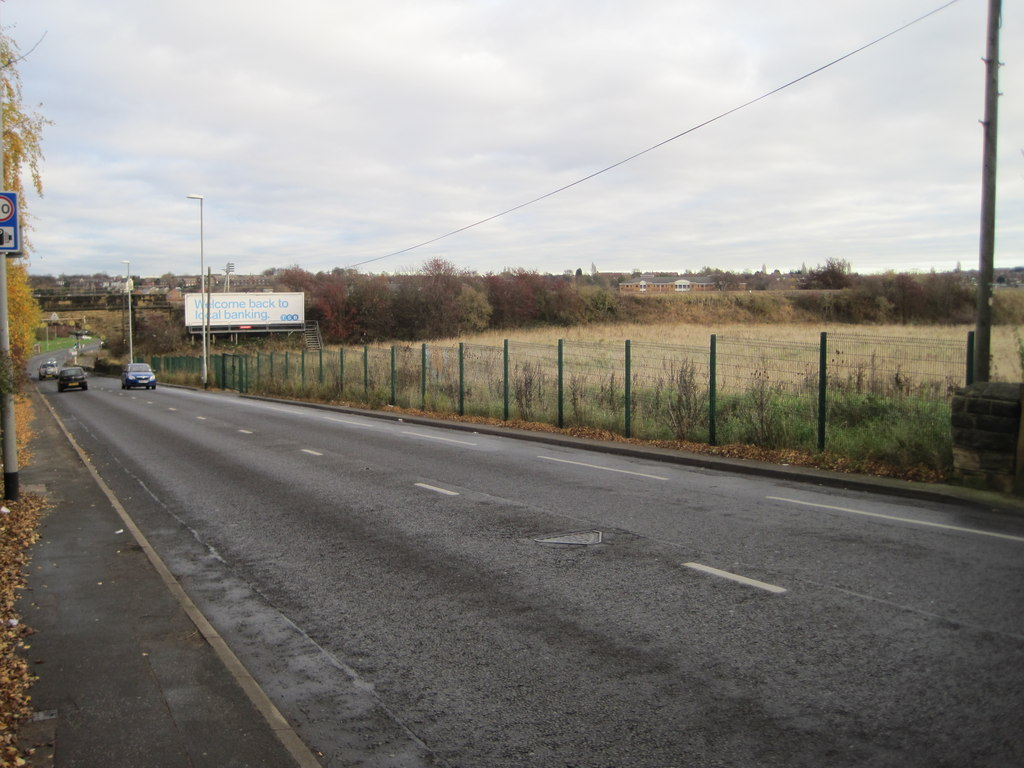
- Site of the former station (2013)

General information
- Location: Churwell, City of Leeds; England
- Coordinates: 53.7636°N 1.5827°W
- Grid reference: SE276297
- Platforms: 2

Other information
- Status: Disused

History
- Original company: London and North Western Railway
- Pre-grouping: London and North Western Railway
- Post-grouping: London, Midland and Scottish Railway

Key dates
- 18 September 1848: Opened
- 2 December 1940: Closed
Location

Churwell railway station served the village of Churwell, West Yorkshire, England, from 1848 to 1940 on the Huddersfield line.

== History ==
The station opened on 18 September 1848 by the London and North Western Railway. The station was situated on the embankment southeast of the railway bridge across Elland Road. H. H. Asquith and Sir Charles Scarth, the Mayor of Morley, both met at the station on 16 October 1895 and they both rode up Churwell Hill for the official ceremony of Morley Town Hall. The station was closed to both passengers and goods traffic on 2 December 1940.

Preceding station	Historical railways	Following station
Cottingley	London and North Western Railway; Huddersfield line	Morley
