= Gildersome East railway station =

Disused railway station in Gildersome, West Yorkshire

Coordinates: 53.7503°N 1.6329°W

Gildersome East

General information
- Location: Gildersome, West Riding of Yorkshire; England
- Platforms: 2

Other information
- Status: Disused

History
- Original company: London and North Western Railway
- Pre-grouping: London and North Western Railway

Key dates
- 1 October 1900: Opened
- 1 August 1917: Closed as a wartime economy measure
- 5 May 1919: Reopened
- 11 July 1921: Closed
Location

Gildersome East railway station served the village of Gildersome, West Yorkshire, England, from 1900 to 1921 on the Leeds New Line.

== History ==
The station was opened on 1 October 1900 by the London and North Western Railway. The goods yard consisted of three sidings as with stables and warehouses. It didn't bring in much revenue due to its remote location and it was only used by workers for the nearby St Bernard's. It closed as a wartime economy measure on 1 August 1917 but reopened on 5 May 1919, only to close again on 11 July 1921.

| Preceding station | Historical railways | Following station |
|---|---|---|
| Farnley and Wortley; Line open, station closed | Leeds New Line; London and North Western Railway | Birstall Town; Line and station closed |
