= Slaithwaite railway station =

Railway station in West Yorkshire, England

Slaithwaite
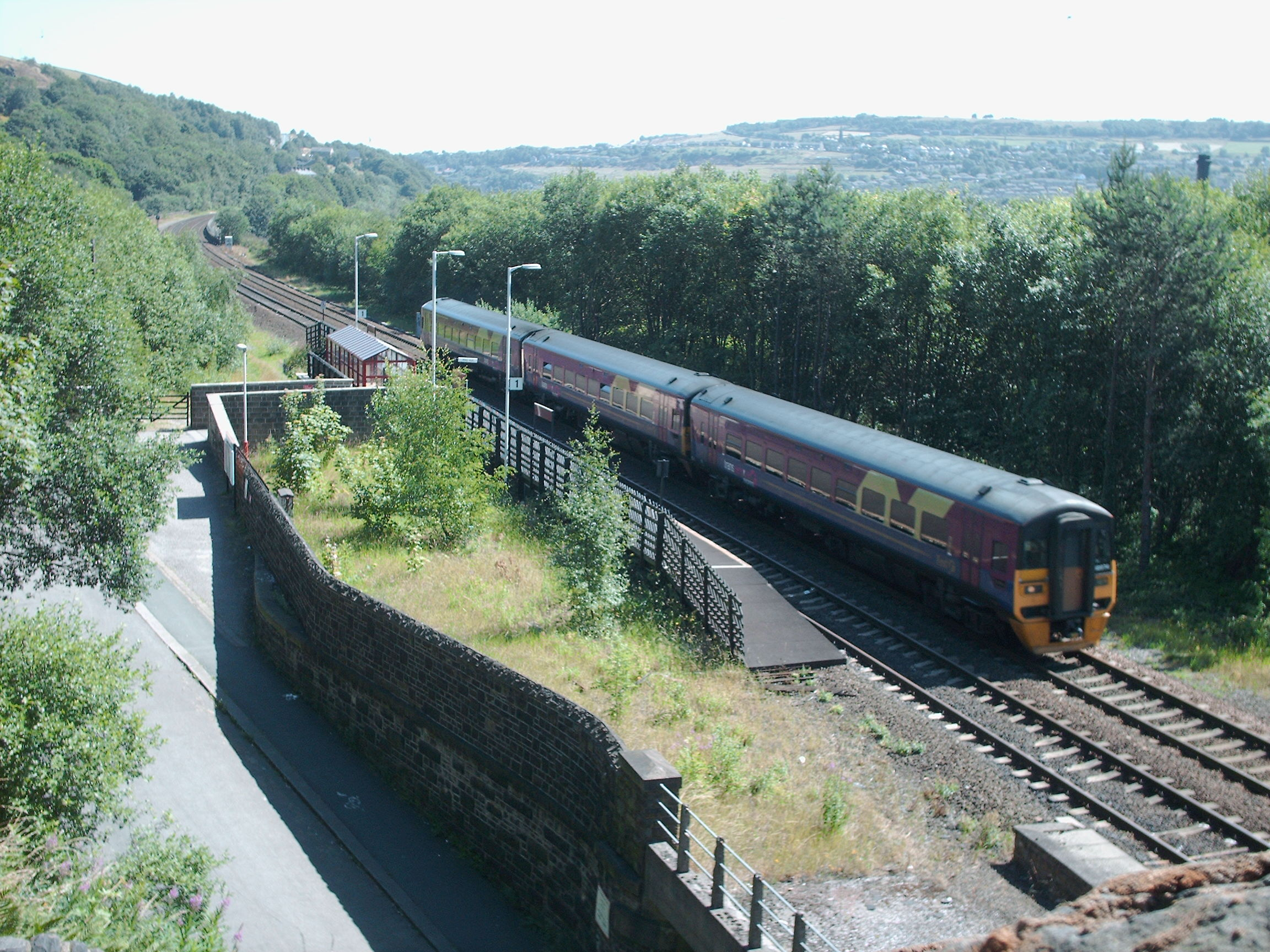
- Platform 1

General information
- Location: Slaithwaite, Kirklees; England
- Coordinates: 53.623800°N 1.881480°W
- Grid reference: SE079141
- Managed by: Northern Trains
- Transit authority: West Yorkshire (Metro)
- Platforms: 2

Other information
- Station code: SWT
- Fare zone: 5
- Classification: DfT category F2

History
- Original company: London and North Western Railway

Key dates
- 1849: Original station opened
- 7 October 1968: closed
- 13 December 1982: Present station opened

Passengers
- 2020/21: ▼55,108
- 2021/22: ▲0.186 million
- 2022/23: ▲0.188 million
- 2023/24: ▼0.183 million
- 2024/25: ▲0.235 million
Location
Notes
- Passenger statistics from the Office of Rail and Road

Slaithwaite railway station serves the town of Slaithwaite, West Yorkshire, England. The station is 4 miles (6 km) west of Huddersfield railway station on the Huddersfield Line between Huddersfield and Manchester Victoria.

The station is situated between the centre of the town and the "Hill Top" residential area. The station has two platforms with a car park and bus stop at the approach to Platform 2. The current station was opened on 13 December 1982 by Metro (the West Yorkshire Passenger Transport Executive) and British Rail. The Huddersfield-bound platform is on the site of an earlier four platform station which opened in 1849 and closed on 7 October 1968. The current Stalybridge-bound platform is on the site of the old goods yard.

This station is operated by Northern Trains but TransPennine Express is the sole operator serving the station.

== Facilities ==
The station is unstaffed. As of November 2018, tickets can be purchased from one of two Ticket Vending Machines situated on the station. These are located on each of the two platforms, offering a better provision than that which was removed from the eastbound platform in July 2018. There are shelters on both platforms, along with timetable poster boards and digital information displays. Train running information can also be obtained by telephone. Step-free access to both platforms (which are staggered) is available via ramps from the nearby road (westbound) or through the station car park (eastbound). Access to the westbound platform is via the car park, and to the eastbound from the nearby road by crossing under the railway bridge.

Platforms on both Eastbound and Westbound sides of the station were extended in May 2018 and can now accommodate up to four carriages, enabling the use of six-car trains (pairs of three-car sets). Following a period of having no shelters, in September 2018, new passenger shelters were erected on both the west and eastbound platforms by the station's operator Northern.

== Services ==
As of May 2025, Slaithwaite is served by an hourly TransPennine Express service between Manchester Piccadilly and Huddersfield throughout the week (including Sundays). These usually continue onward eastbound to York via Castleford.

Additional trains call at Slaithwaite during the AM and PM peak.

Preceding station	National Rail	Following station
Marsden	TransPennine Express North Transpennine Manchester–Huddersfield (stopping service)	Huddersfield
	Historical railways	
Marsden; Line and station open	L&NWR; Huddersfield Line	Golcar; Line open, Station closed

== Gallery ==
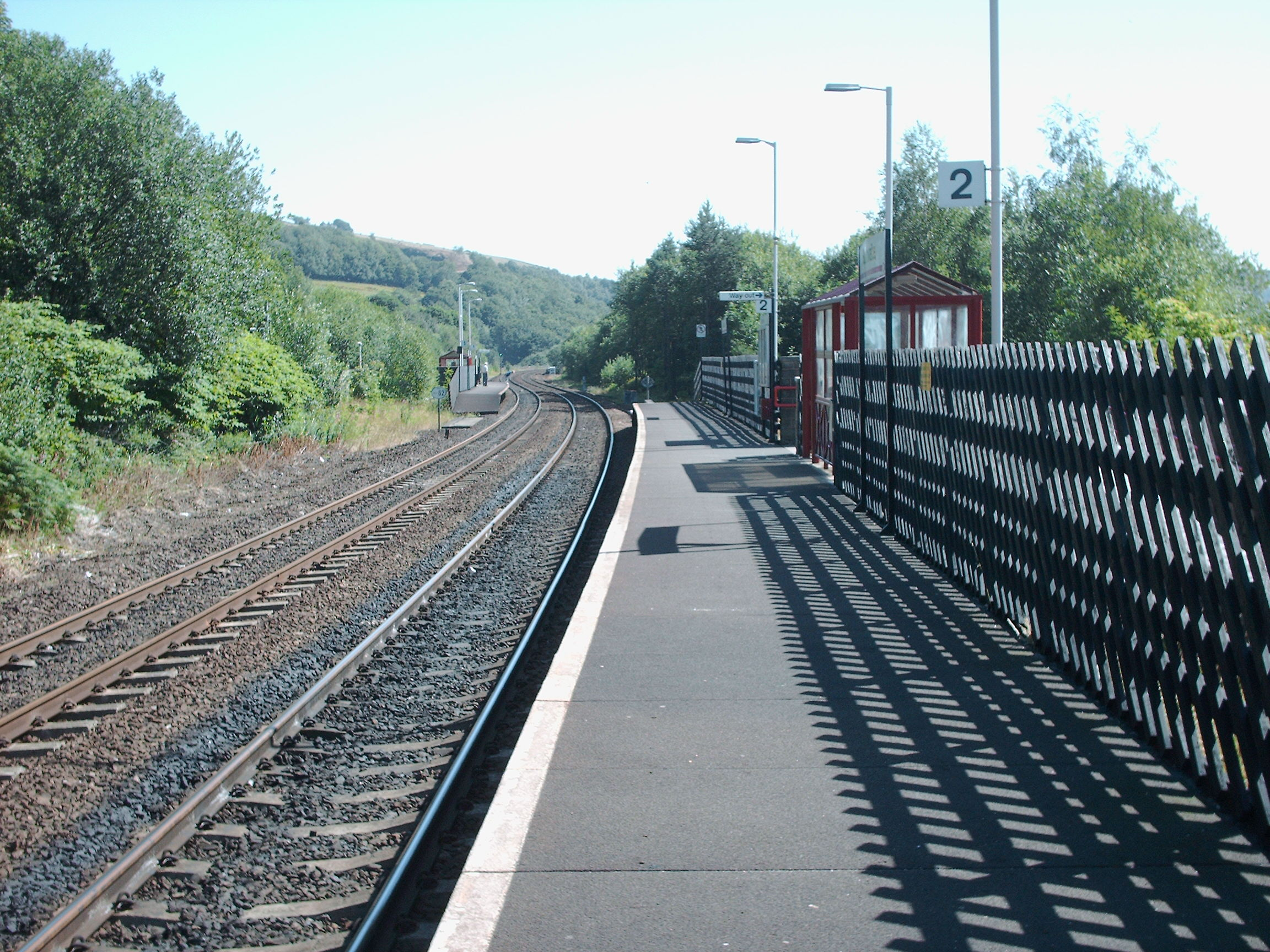
Platform 2
