= Farnley and Wortley railway station =

Disused railway station in West Yorkshire, England

Farnley and Wortley
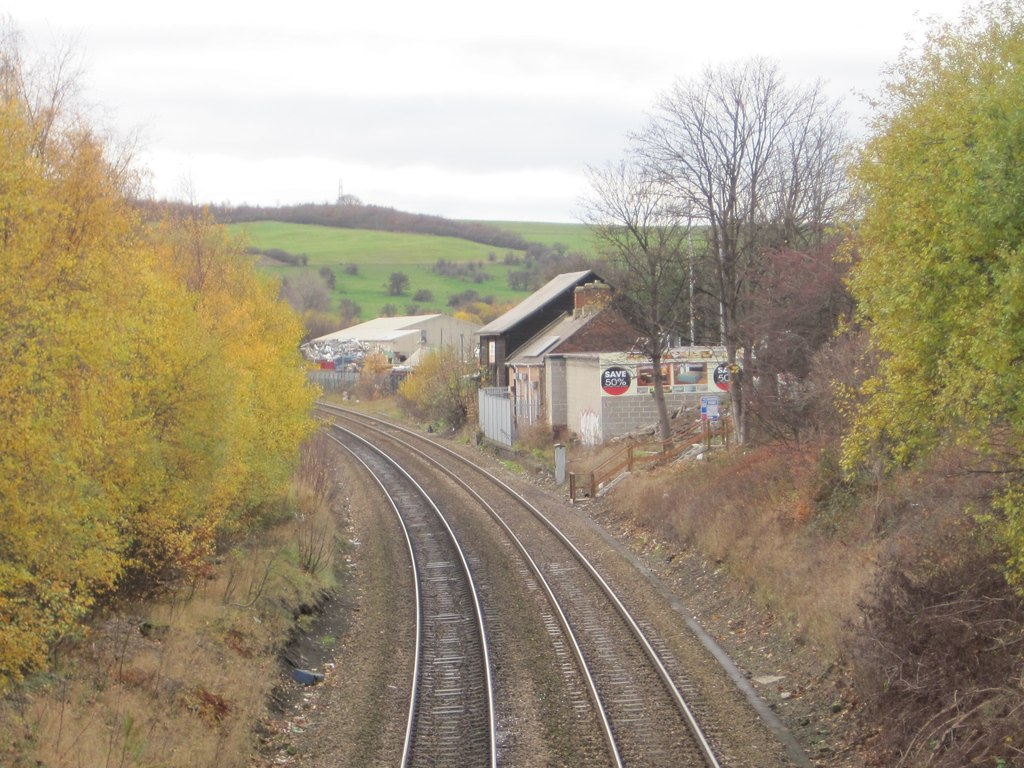
- Site of the station (2013)

General information
- Location: Farnley Wortley, Leeds 53.7823°N 1.5847°W; England
- Grid reference: SE274318
- Platforms: 2

Other information
- Status: Disused

History
- Original company: London and North Western Railway
- Pre-grouping: London and North Western Railway
- Post-grouping: London, Midland and Scottish Railway

Key dates
- 8 October 1848: Opened as Farnley and Wortley
- 1 February 1877: Name changed to Wortley and Farnley
- 1 March 1882: Resited
- 1891: Name changed to Farnley and Wortley
- 3 November 1952: Closed
Location

Farnley and Wortley railway station served the districts of Farnley and Wortley in Leeds, England from 1848 to 1952 on the Huddersfield line.

== History ==
The station opened on 8 October 1848 by the London and North Western Railway. The station's name was changed to Wortley and Farnley on 1 February 1877. It was resited on 1 March 1882 when the viaduct line was opened into Leeds. The original platforms were removed shortly after. The name was reverted to Farnley and Wortley in 1891. The station closed to both passengers and goods traffic on 3 November 1952.

Preceding station	Historical railways	Following station
Leeds Central; Line open, station closed	London and North Western Railway; Huddersfield line	Cottingley; Line and station open
