= Heaton Lodge Junction =

Railway junction in Yorkshire, England

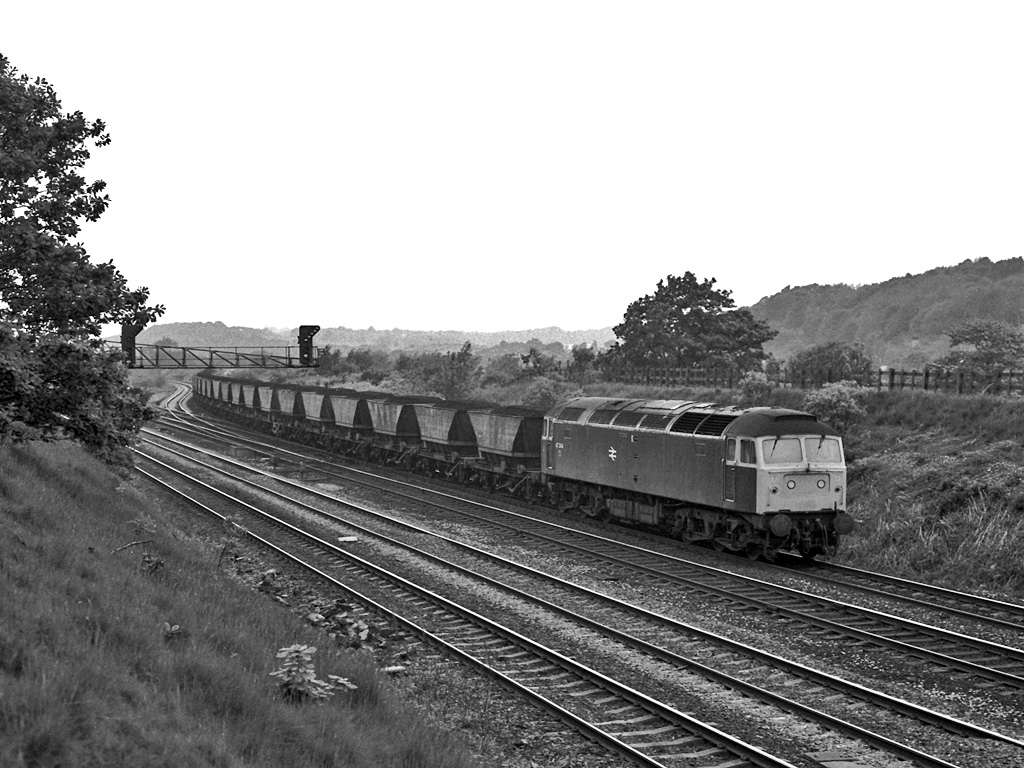
- Heaton Lodge East Junction; the train is coming off the spur built on the formation of the Leeds New Line

Overview
- Status: Open
- Owner: Network Rail
- Locale: Mirfield, West Yorkshire, England

Service
- Type: Railway junction
- Services: Calder Valley line; Huddersfield line; Leeds New Line (1900-1965)
- Operator(s): Grand Central; Arriva Rail North; TransPennine Express; Various freight operators
- Ridership: 50 million (yearly average)

History
- Opened: 1847 (as a junction)

Technical
- Track gauge: 1,435 mm (4 ft 8 1/2 in) standard gauge
Heaton Lodge Junction 1988-c. 2030

Heaton Lodge Junction is a railway junction on the Trans-Pennine line, which connects Manchester Piccadilly with Leeds via Huddersfield, and the Calder Valley Line through Sowerby Bridge to Wakefield. The line and junctions were historically important as they connected the industrialised areas of Lancashire and Yorkshire.

== History ==
The line through the Heaton Lodge area was first opened in October 1840 as part of the Manchester and Leeds Railway, (later the Lancashire & Yorkshire Railway (L&YR)). In 1847, the London North Western Railway's (LNWR) section of railway between Heaton Lodge and Huddersfield opened to traffic, which had an east-facing junction at Heaton Lodge. Initially, the route, which was part of the Standedge Line (the modern Trans-Pennine Line) was to have run through Mirfield on separate tracks, but the L&YR acknowledged that it could not oppose the route, so accepted the LNWR having running powers between Heaton Lodge and Thornhill. Due to a growth in traffic from both companies, the line between Heaton Lodge and Huddersfield was widened to four lines in 1884, and the section eastwards to Thornhill was completed at the same time, with the LNWR later building an independent line on the northern side of the quadrupled track. The 2.5-mile (4 km) section of line between Heaton Lodge and Mirfield was constrained by a two-track bridge over the River Calder. This was finally enlarged in 1932 into a four-track railway.

Despite the quadrupling of track, the line between Thornhill and Leeds via Dewsbury was still constrained by the two running lines. A secondary line was constructed between Heaton Lodge and Leeds via Gildersome, and became known as the Leeds New Line, opening in 1900.

In the 1930s, the section between Heaton Lodge and Thornhill Junction was fitted with an experimental signalling system installed by the LMS known as "speed signalling" and based on an American practice of signalling. The system indicated which direction the train was to take and the speed it was to assume on taking that route. However, the driver could be presented with red, yellow and green lights on the one signal as they approached. A major re-signalling project in the 1969 changed all of this back to normal UK practice. Further rationalisation occurred after the Leeds New Line had closed in 1965. The trackbed of the Leeds New Line, where it burrowed under the Calder Valley Line, was re-instated as a new chord connecting the dive-under line to the east direction of the running lines towards Mirfield. This was completed in 1970. The new chord allowed fast passenger services between Huddersfield and Leeds to use lines separate from those on the Calder Valley Line, so freight trains and passenger trains could remain separate. At the same time, the slow Calder Valley lines west of Heaton Lodge Junction were used for wagon storage. A further fall in traffic saw the double-track dive-under reduced to a single line, and the line between Heaton Lodge and Thornhill rationalised into a reduced three-track railway in 1988, with three platforms at Mirfield railway station.

Grand Central, Northern and TransPennine Express operate trains using the line and junction, carrying about 50 million passengers a year on average. Freight operators also use the section of line.

== Transpennine Route Upgrade ==
As part of the Transpennine Route Upgrade, the junction will be remodelled so that the line between Huddersfield and Thornhill Junction will have four lines. Two fast lines will run on the eastern to the southern side, whilst the slower lines, serving Deighton, Mirfield and Ravensthorpe, will be on the western and northern side. This part of the TRU project (known as contract W3) will include the restoration of over 7 miles (11 km) of quadruple track (currently at two lines to Thornhill Junction, three to Heaton Lodge Junction, and then two lines to Huddersfield). With the gauge clearance, track reinstatement, the re-siting of Mirfield and Ravensthorpe stations, and the electrification of the route, the final bill for the section between Dewsbury and Huddersfield is expected to be £3 billion (estimated in 2023).

== Chronology ==
Heaton Lodge in LNWR days c. 1911

Heaton Lodge post TransPennine Upgrade. The final layout may differ from the projected design dated 2023.

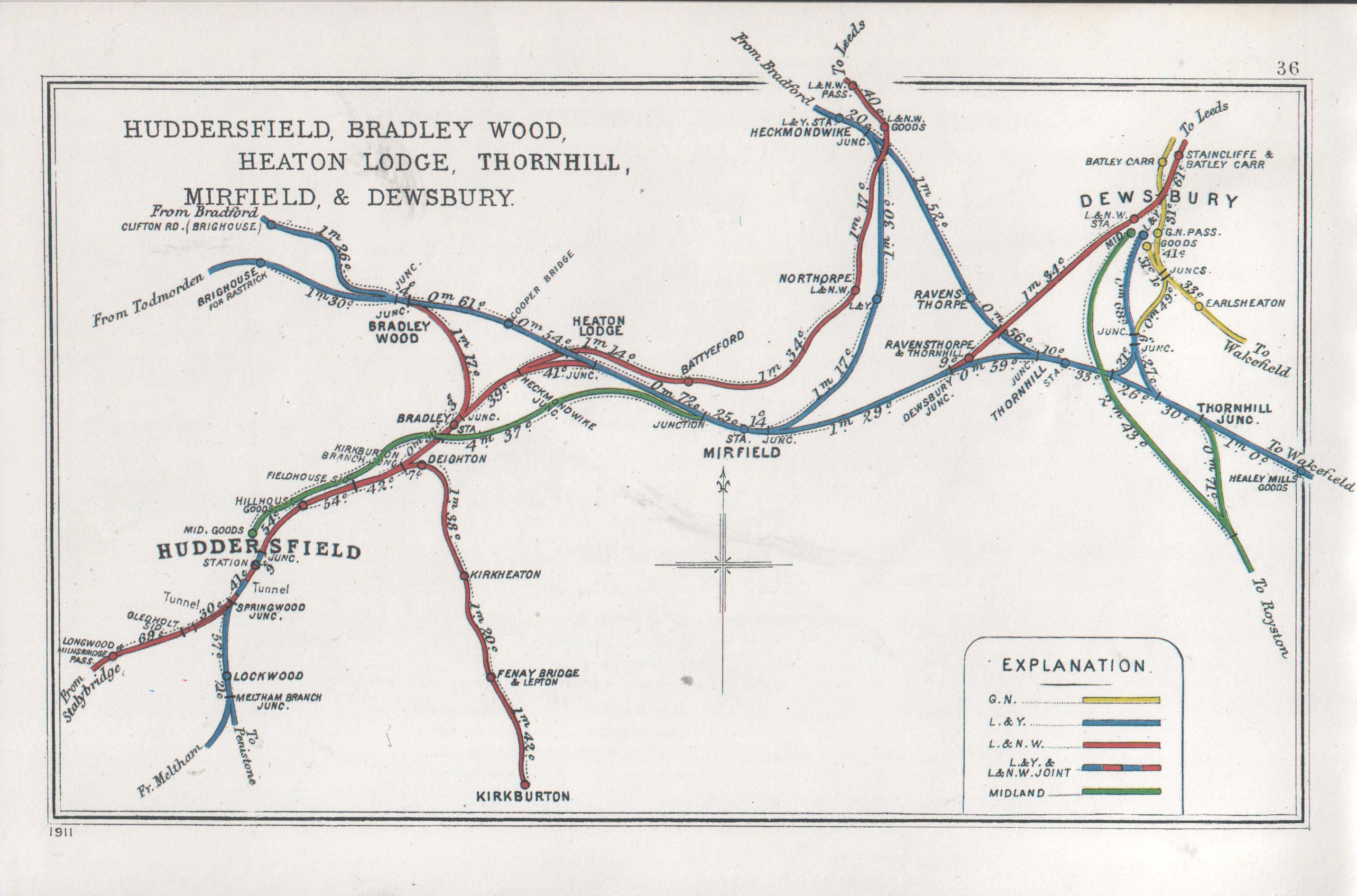
Huddersfield, Bradley Wood, Heaton Lodge, Thornhill, Mirfield & Dewsbury

- 1841 – the line through Heaton Lodge opens as a plain line between Hebden Bridge and Normanton
- 1847 – Heaton Lodge becomes a junction with the addition of the line to Huddersfield joining at Heaton Lodge
- 1884 – the section between Ravensthorpe and Heaton Lodge was quadrupled in February
- 1884 – the section from Heaton Lodge to Huddersfield was quadrupled in April
- 1900 – Leeds New Line opens
- 1965 – Leeds New Line closes in August
- 1970 – dive-under for Leeds New Line formation re-used to allow Huddersfield trains to access the Calder Valley Line without using the flat crossing Junction at Heaton Lodge
- 1988 – Thornhill to Heaton Lodge remodelled to three lines
- 2030s (estimated) – track between Huddersfield, Heaton Lodge and Thornhill Junction re-quadrupled, (and the whole TRU project completed)

Additionally, when the LNWR Leeds New Line opened in 1900, the junction with the main running lines north of Deighton was known as:

- Heckmondwike Junction (1899–1923)
- Spen Valley Junction (1923–1970)
- Heaton Lodge South Junction (1970– )

== Accidents ==
- On 3 November 1849, a passenger train collided into the rear of a goods train at Heaton Lodge Junction. The accident report's author criticised the amount of trains using the section between Mirfield and Heaton Lodge.
- 9 September 1864 - a local passenger train between Normanton and Huddersfield was running 16 minutes late and collided with a goods train at Heaton Lodge Junction. Four people were seriously hurt.
- 22 March 1865 - a passenger train collided with a goods train that was shunting out from Heaton Lodge sidings onto the main running lines. The goods train had been instructed to wait for the passenger train to pass.
- 7 July 1918, a collision between two trains. Two people were injured, but no fatalities.

At least two deaths of railwaymen occurred in the sidings at Heaton Lodge; on 30 November 1868, and 2 May 1914. Both men were run over by railway wagons and had their legs crushed. Both later died in hospital.

== See also ==
- Transpennine Route Upgrade
