= Huddersfield railway station =

Grade I listed railway station in West Yorkshire, England

Huddersfield
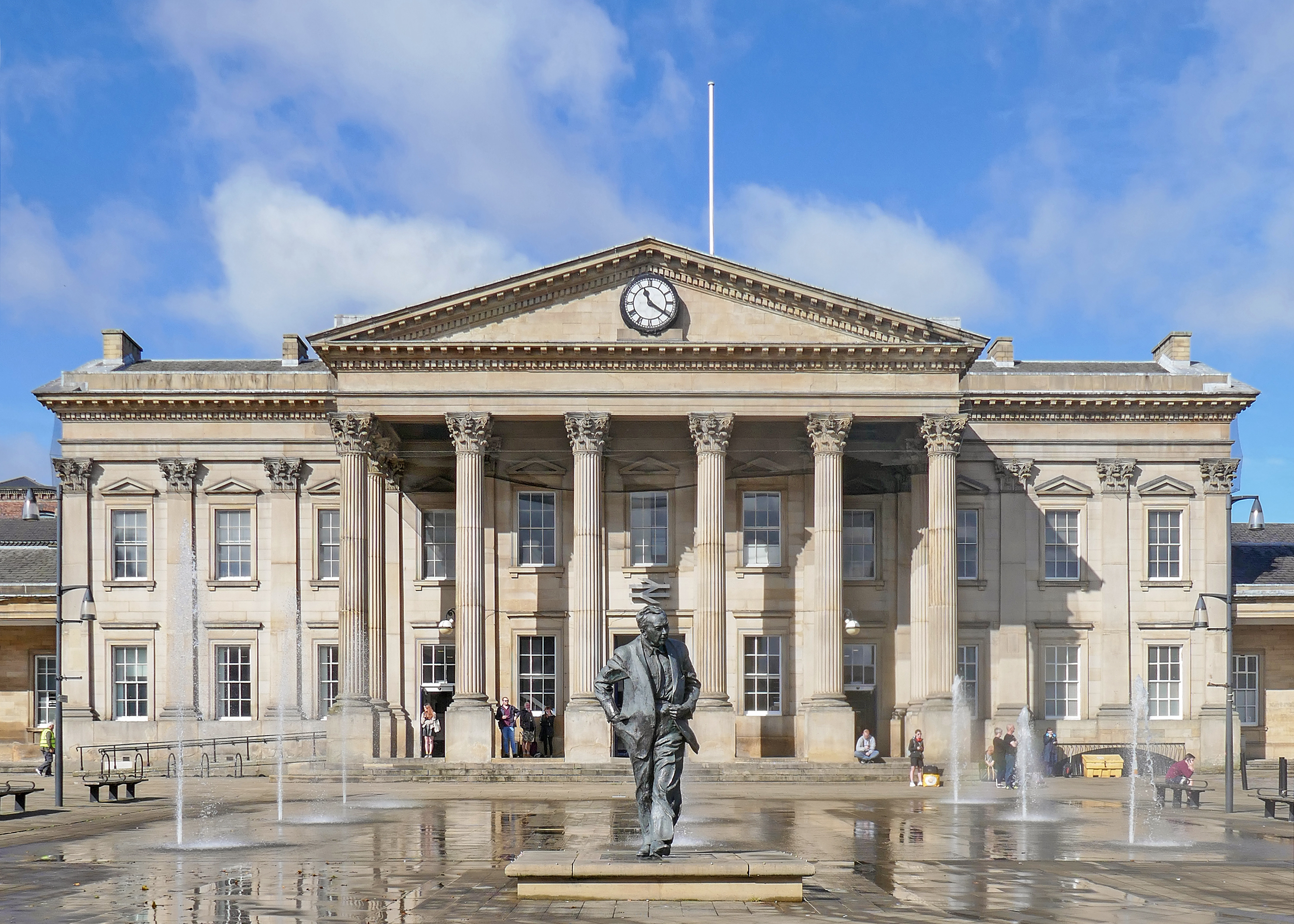
- St George's Square entrance

General information
- Location: Huddersfield, Kirklees, England
- Coordinates: 53.648°N 1.785°W
- Grid reference: SE143168
- Manager: TransPennine Express
- Transit authority: West Yorkshire (Metro)
- Platforms: 3 (4 - 6 under construction)

Other information
- Station code: HUD
- Fare zone: 5
- Classification: DfT category B

History
- Opened: 3 August 1847; 179 years ago
- Original company: London and North Western Railway
- Pre-grouping: London and North Western Railway/Lancashire and Yorkshire Railway (joint)
- Post-grouping: London, Midland and Scottish Railway

Passengers
- 2021/22: ▲3.042 million
- Interchange: 0.378 million
- 2022/23: ▼3.021 million
- Interchange: ▲0.456 million
- 2023/24: ▲3.022 million
- Interchange: ▲0.603 million
- 2024/25: ▲3.136 million
- Interchange: ▲0.751 million
- 2025/26: ▼2.853 million
- Interchange: ▼0.404 million

Listed Building – Grade I
- Feature: Railway station
- Designated: 3 March 1952
- Reference no.: 1277385
Location
Notes
- Passenger statistics from the Office of Rail and Road

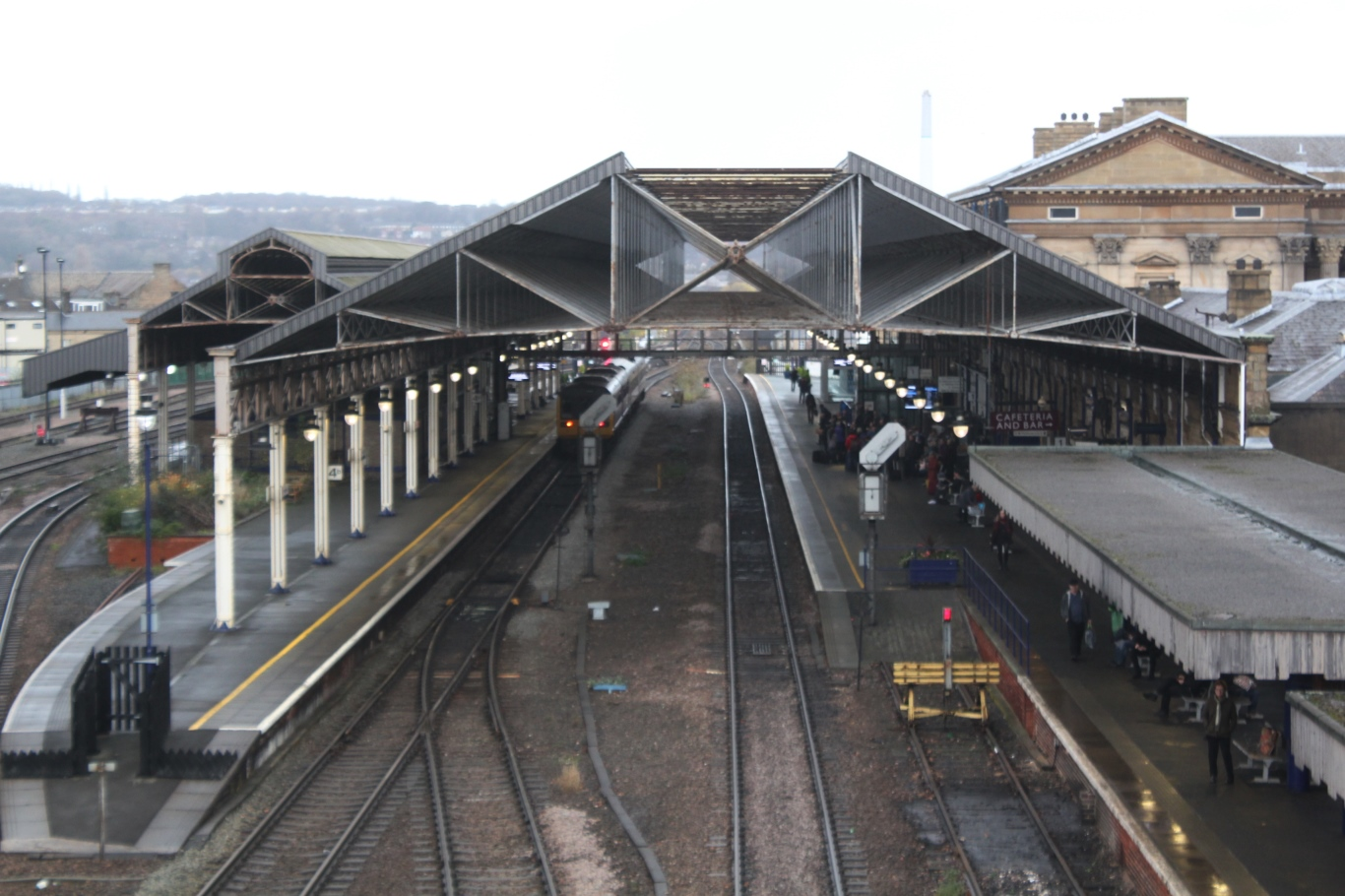
The view from the south with platforms 1 and 2 on the right

Huddersfield railway station serves the town of Huddersfield, in West Yorkshire, England. It is a stop on the Huddersfield line and is managed by TransPennine Express, which provides trains between the North West, Yorkshire and the North East. It is also served by Northern Trains, which operates trains on the Huddersfield, Penistone and Caldervale lines.

== History ==
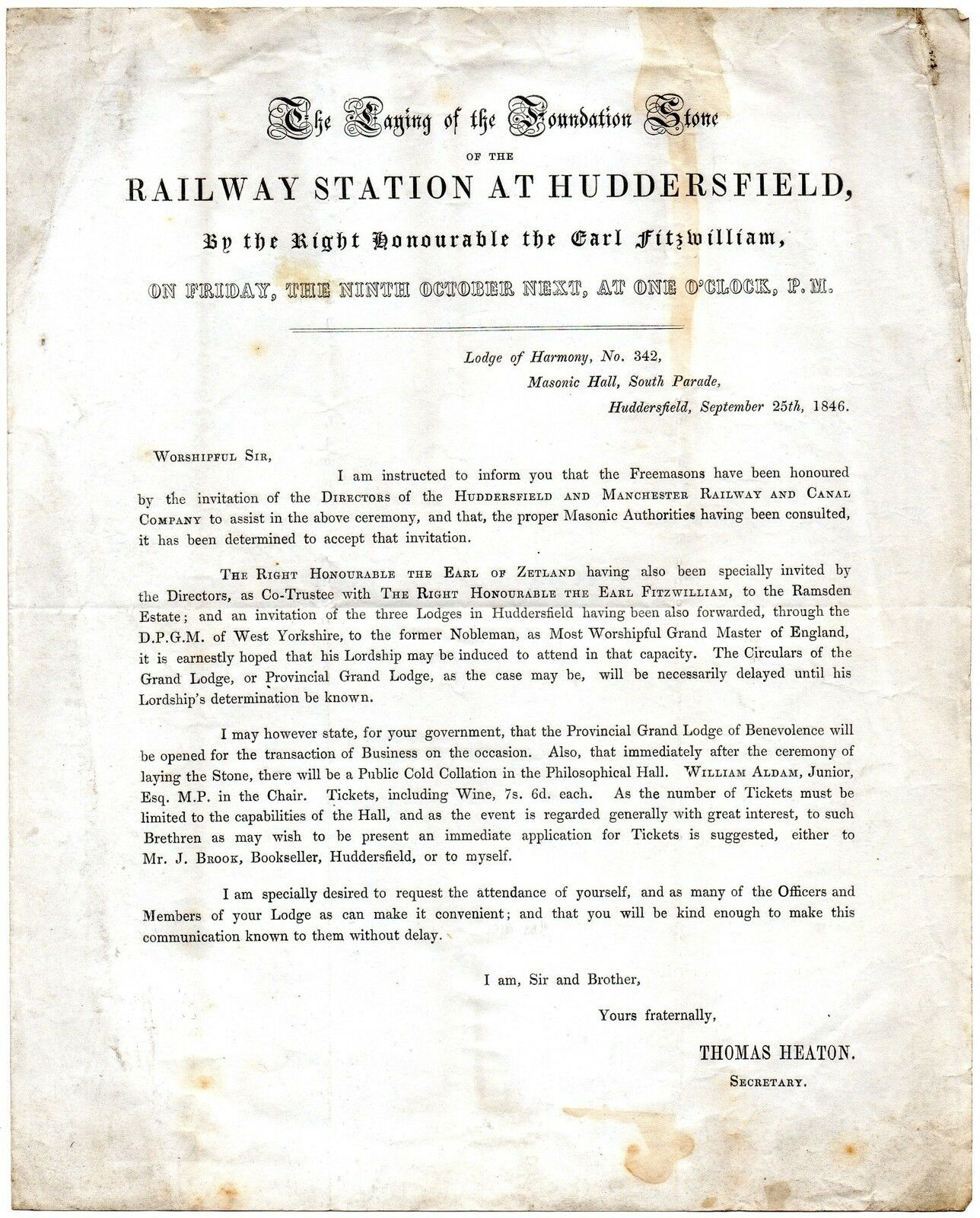
Freemasons' circular, dated 25 September 1846, regarding attendance at the laying of the station's foundation stone by the Earl Fitzwilliam (transcription)

Huddersfield station in 1987

Designed by the architect James Pigott Pritchett and built by the firm of Joseph Kaye in 1846–50 using the neo-classical style, the station is well known in architectural circles for its classical-style facade, with a portico of the Corinthian order, consisting of six columns in width and two in depth, which dominates St George's Square. It faces out towards Lion Buildings. It is a Grade I listed building. In the 1880s, the station was extended with the installation of an island platform with an overall roof. The roof partially collapsed on 10 August 1885, killing four people.

The station frontage was described by John Betjeman as "the most splendid in England" and by Sir Nikolaus Pevsner as "one of the best early railway stations in England" and "the only important Victorian railway station [in the West Riding]." Similarly, Simon Jenkins reported it to be one of the best 100 stations in Britain.

In 2010, Network Rail and First TransPennine Express completed a series of improvements to the station in order to provide better access for passengers. This consisted of two new lifts and a new staircase to the subway on platform 1. The new staircase replaced the existing staircase inside the booking hall; each platform received new information screens.

In early 2011, further improvement works were carried out to the concourse and waiting area. This phase of improvements was funded by the Railway Heritage Trust, Metro, Kirklees Council and the National Stations Improvement Programme. The main purpose of this was to reduce bottlenecks at peak times as well as general crowding. The redundant stable block on platform 1 was also turned into a staff training centre and toilets.

Automatic ticket barriers were installed at the station in May 2013.

Work is underway as of October 2025 on Network Rail's Transpennine Route Upgrade project, which will see electrification of the Huddersfield Line, allowing many of the services through the station to switch to newer, faster electric rolling stock. As part of this project the signal box on platform 4, which was decommissioned previously, is being removed, its control area already passed to the York Rail Operating Centre as a part of the Huddersfield Re-signalling project. To match the quadrupling of the line north of Huddersfield, the project will in effect split the existing island platform, extending the existing bay platforms 5 and 6 to form two new through platforms covered by a new roof, and add a new footbridge at the Leeds end. The process will also include relocating the 1880s island platform tea room, and rotating it through 180 degrees.

The station had been closed for some weeks during 2025 but was partially reopened on 29 September. The overall work programme continues until early 2027.

== Description ==
There are six platforms:

- Platform 1, serving express services to Manchester Piccadilly, Manchester Airport and Liverpool (via Manchester Victoria), now renamed platform 2.
- Platform 2, a terminal bay platform for Penistone Line services to/from Sheffield, now renamed platform 1.
- Platform 4, service stopping services to Leeds (4a) and Manchester Piccadilly (4b), now renamed platform 3. One evening train from Hull also terminates at Platform 4a.
- Platforms 5 and 6 are bay platforms for local services to/from Bradford Interchange via Halifax and Wakefield Kirkgate.
- Platform 8, serving express services to Leeds, Hull, York, Scarborough, Middlesbrough and Newcastle.

During the TRU project rebuilding work, there are only three platforms in use - a west end bay for the Penistone line (numbered 1) and two through platforms for all other services (numbered 2 and 3, westbound and eastbound, respectively). These are the old platforms 1 and 4. Platforms 5, 6 and 8 are out of service whilst that side of the station is being reconstructed.

The station fronts Saint George's Square, which was refurbished in 2009. The square has been made a pedestrian zone. No car parking is available in front of the station entrance, but it is nearby on Brook Street.

The station is situated a short distance from Huddersfield bus station, so interchange facilities are possible but limited. The Huddersfield FreeCityBus connects the railway station with the bus station, as well as the University of Huddersfield and other areas of the town centre.

Two pubs are within the station frontage, to each side of the main entrance: The Head Of Steam and The King's Head (previously known as The Station Tavern). Both facilities are accessible from platform 1. At the building's entrance, the booking office is to the left and to the right are the train timetables and a newsagent. Platforms 4 to 8 are located via a lift or subway, accessed from platform 1. The public conveniences are located through this subway at the top of the steps to platforms 4–8. The platforms are all covered by a large canopy. To the rear of the station are some carriage sidings.

On the disused side of platform 2, an old carriage is bolted to the ground, alongside a grounded body of a Class 144 Pacer. Set in its window is a plaque commemorating 100 years of Steamtrain Hoorn Medemblik, a Dutch heritage railway.

== Facilities ==
The station is staffed 24 hours a day, with the booking office open from 05:45 to 20:00 Mondays to Saturdays and 07:45 to 20:00 on Sundays. There are also four self-service ticket machines available in the ticket hall for use when the booking office is closed or for collecting pre-paid tickets. Automated train announcements, customer help points and digital display screens provide train running information on all platforms. In addition to the aforementioned pubs, the station has a waiting room and buffet on platform 4 and a coffee kiosk on platform 1.

== Services ==
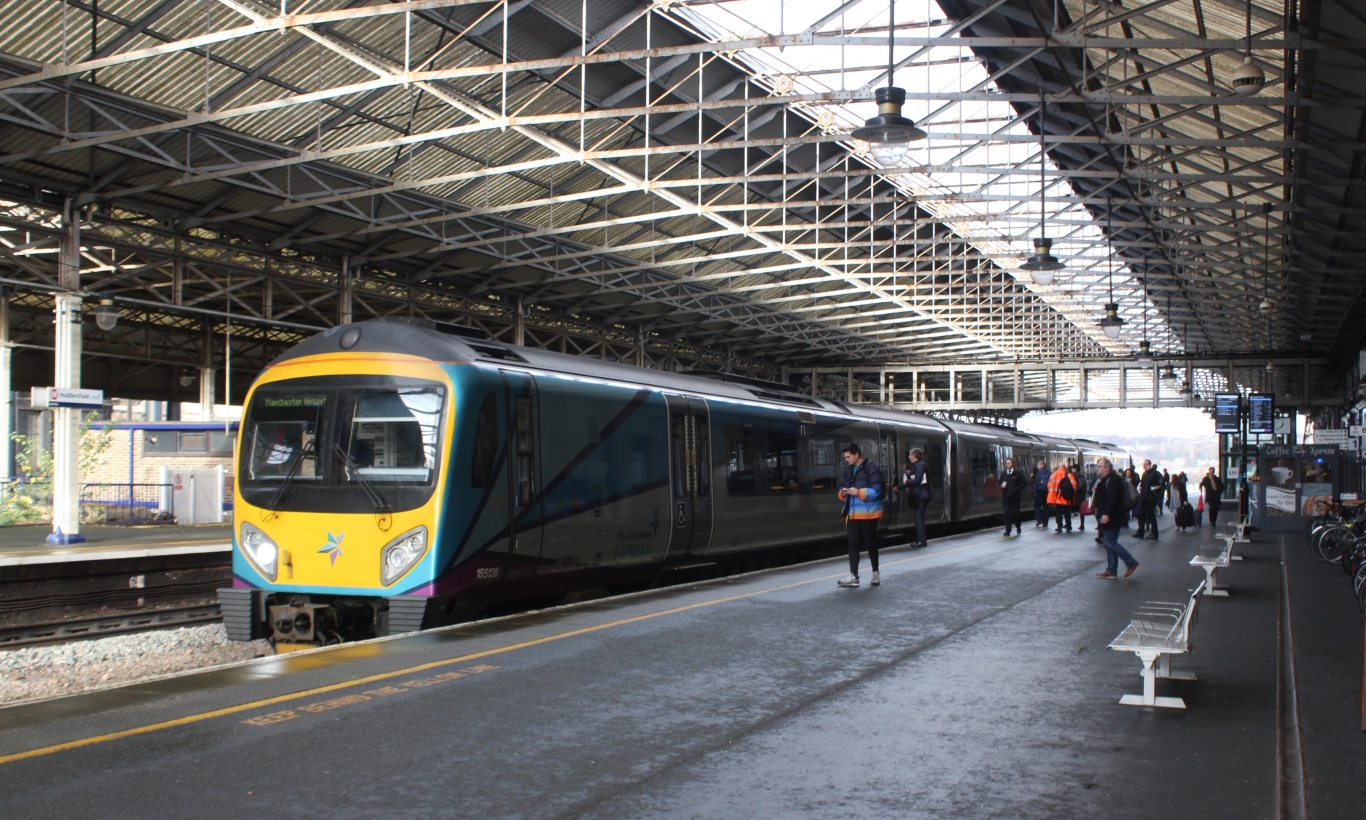
A westbound TransPennine Express service

The station is served by two train operating companies, with the following off-peak weekday service in trains per hour:

TransPennine Express

- 1 tph to Newcastle, via Leeds and York
- 1 tph to Redcar Central, via Leeds and York
- 1 tph to Scarborough, via Leeds and York
- 1 tph to Hull Paragon, via Leeds
- 1 tph to York, via Castleford
- 1 tph to Manchester Piccadilly
- 2 tph to Manchester Victoria, of which 1 tph continues to Manchester Airport
- 2 tph to Liverpool Lime Street. West of Manchester, one calls at Newton-le-Willows and the other at Lea Green (for St Helens).

Northern Trains:

- 1 tph to Sheffield

Replacement buses run in place of the Bradford service (as far as Brighouse), as no space is available to terminate that service here, with the bay platforms out of use. Local passengers for Leeds via Dewsbury should also use this to connect with the Bradford interchange to Dewsbury and Leeds stopping trains. This will remain until January 2027, when the new platforms on the north side will be ready.

In keeping with the on-site Head of Steam railway pub, several steam trains still pass through Huddersfield station, including the Cotton Mill Express and the Scarborough Flyer.

Preceding station	National Rail	Following station
Manchester Victoria	TransPennine Express North TransPennine	Leeds
Slaithwaite	TransPennine Express North TransPennine	Dewsbury
Stalybridge	TransPennine Express North TransPennine	Deighton
Terminus	Northern Trains Huddersfield line	Deighton
Terminus	Northern Trains Calder Valley line	Brighouse
Terminus	Northern Trains Penistone Line	Lockwood
Disused railways
Longwood and Milnsbridge	L&YR	Terminus

== Station cats ==
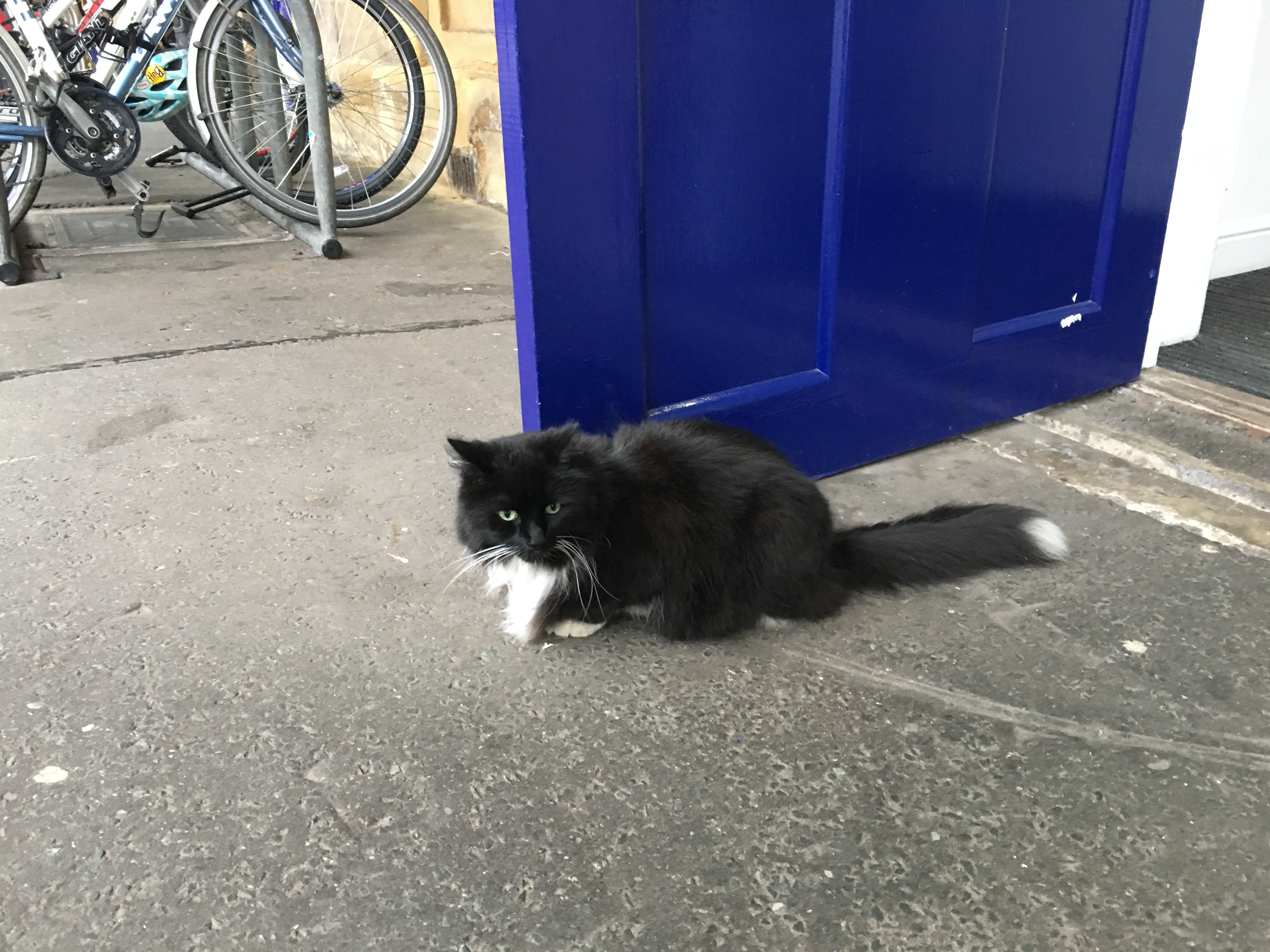
Felix by the door of the station offices on platform 1

Felix, the first station cat at Huddersfield for at least 30 years, joined the staff as a nine-week-old kitten in 2011. She subsequently patrolled the station to keep it free from rodents, and had her own cat-flap to bypass the ticket barriers. In 2016 Felix was promoted to Senior Pest Controller and local artist Rob Martin painted a portrait of her which now hangs in the station. In 2019, TransPennine Express named a Class 68 locomotive (68031) after Felix.

A second station cat, Bolt, joined the staff in September 2018 as an eight-week-old kitten.

The two cats featured in calendars and two books, raising more than £266,000 for charity.

Felix died on 3 December 2023 after the discovery of tumours which led to medical complications.

On 9 July 2025, Bolt's retirement from the station was announced. He died after a traffic collision which was announced on 28 September 2026.

== See also ==
- Grade I listed buildings in West Yorkshire
- Listed buildings in Huddersfield (Newsome Ward - central area)
