= Lydgate Viaduct =

Viaduct in West Yorkshire, England

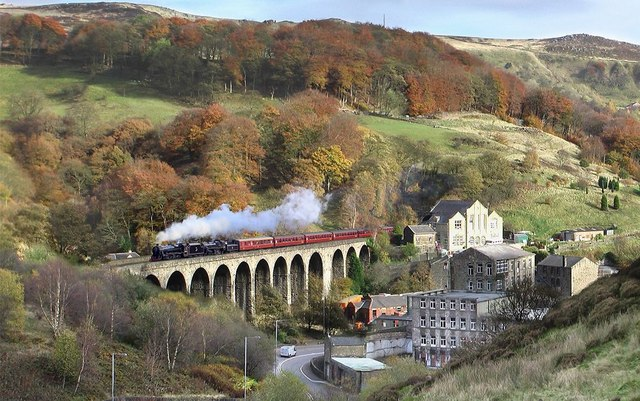
- Lydgate Viaduct
- Coordinates: 53°43′39″N 2°07′20″W
- OS grid reference: SD920256
- Carries: Calder Valley line
- Locale: Lydgate, Todmorden, West Yorkshire, England
- Other name(s): Knott Wood Viaduct; Nott Wood Viaduct
- Owner: Network Rail
- ELR no.: FHR6 10

Characteristics
- Total length: 8 chains (530 ft; 160 m) (Note: Chains is the measurement used by the railway engineers in the 19th century, and still in use today on Network Rail.)
- No. of spans: 13

Rail characteristics
- No. of tracks: 2
- Track gauge: 4 ft 8 1/2 in (1,435 mm) standard gauge

History
- Designer: Sir John Hawkshaw
- Opened: 1849

Statistics

Listed Building – Grade II
- Designated: 22 February 1984
- Reference no.: 1228243

Location
- Interactive map of Lydgate Viaduct

Lydgate Viaduct (also known as Nott Wood Viaduct), is a railway bridge in Cliviger Gorge near Todmorden in West Yorkshire, England. The viaduct carries a branch of the Calder Valley line (the Copy Pit route), between Todmorden and Burnley Manchester Road railway station. The line was opened in 1849, and the viaduct was designed by Sir John Hawkshaw, who also designed other viaducts in the Calder Valley. The viaduct was grade II listed in 1984.

== History ==
The proposed line between Todmorden and Burnley was surveyed in 1841 under the name of the North Lancashire Railway, but when construction started, it was different company who had taken the line forward. Work on the viaduct started in the early 1840s, but all construction on the line (including the viaduct) was halted in October 1847 when the railway mania period was curtailed by various problems. Construction restarted in early 1848 and the viaduct was completed in March 1849, but the route itself did not open until November of the same year, and even then, only a single line was laid along the entire route length. The line started out being promoted as part of the Manchester and Leeds Railway's line from Todmorden to Burnley through the Cliviger Gorge, but during the course of the line's construction, the Manchester and Leeds Railway became part of the Lancashire and Yorkshire Railway under the Manchester and Leeds Railway Act (No. 3) 1847 (10 & 11 Vict. c. clxvi) of 1847.

The line rises out of Todmorden at a gradient of 1-in-65, and passes through three tunnels as well as Lydgate (Nott Wood) viaduct. The viaduct is 8 chains (530 ft; 160 m) long, and is part of the Burnley Branch of the Calder Valley Line (the Copy Pit route). The viaduct's high position over the Cliviger valley, has been noted as picturesque setting for photography, with route being described as almost "Alpine" in nature. It has thirteen arches made from gritstone, with stepped voussoirs, but the masonry of the piers is "curiously snecked with thin layers of stone." The Historic England listing states that it is a grade II listed structure, and describes it as "..13 semi-circular arches, impost, tall slender piers, those to either side of Picker Street are broadest. Band carried over arches, parapet with cappings. Splayed buttresses break forward, deep curve to embankment."

The viaduct is known as Lydgate most commonly in the 21st century, but it was originally referred to as Nott Wood Viaduct (or Knott Wood Viaduct), named after Knotts Wood that lies to the immediate north of the viaduct as the line exits Kitson Wood Tunnel (290 yards (270 m)) and onto the viaduct. This name has been adapted locally into North Wood Viaduct. Although it is recognised that John Hawkshaw designed the viaduct, it is sometimes labelled as being a product of George Stephenson, and that it was built in 1908.

In 2017, Network Rail undertook a maintenance project on the viaduct, which included strengthening one of the arches. The viaduct is known to have been warped by the effects of the surrounding topography pushing upon it; so much so, that the architecture of span 13 (the westernmost arch) has been changed from a Roman influence to a Norman influence. This was completed in the same year at a cost of £1.2 million. Network Rail designate the bridge as number FHR6 10; the FHR stands for Farington Curve Junction and Hall Royd (Burnley) Junction line.

== See also ==
- Huddersfield Viaduct
- Lockwood Viaduct
- Penistone Viaduct
