= Huddersfield Viaduct =

Railway viaduct in Yorkshire, England

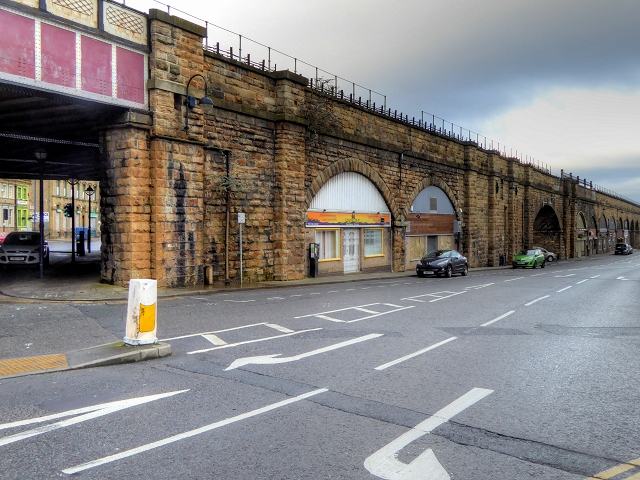
- Huddersfield Viaduct
- Coordinates: 53.653°N 1.781°W
- OS grid reference: SE145173
- Carries: Huddersfield line
- Other name: Hillhouse Viaduct
- Owner: Network Rail

Characteristics
- Total length: 663 yards (606 m)
- Height: 53 feet (16 m) (Maximum)
- No. of spans: 47

Rail characteristics
- No. of tracks: 2 (4 by 2030s) (Note: Date given is for completion of the Transpennine Route Upgrade. Sections of work around Huddersfield may be finished and implemented earlier than the projected timeline for the full line upgrade.)
- Track gauge: 4 ft 8 1/2 in (1,435 mm) standard gauge
- Electrified: Overhead catenary (2030s)

History
- Construction start: 10 October 1845
- Construction cost: £49,000 (1847)
- Opened: 3 August 1847
- Rebuilt: 1883

Statistics

Listed Building – Grade II
- Designated: 28 September 1978
- Reference no.: 1223531

Location
- Interactive map of Huddersfield Viaduct

Huddersfield Viaduct (or Hillhouse Viaduct) is a railway bridge to the north-east of Huddersfield railway station in West Yorkshire, England. The viaduct carries the Huddersfield Line connecting Huddersfield with Dewsbury, Leeds, and York eastwards, and Manchester and Liverpool westwards. The viaduct was built to carry two lines, but was widened in the 1880s to take four tracks, and then reduced to two tracks in 1970. Huddersfield Viaduct is less well-known than other viaducts in the Kirklees area as they are higher, but Huddersfield Viaduct is the longest in the Kirklees district.

As part of the Transpennine Route Upgrade (TRU), the viaduct will again have four lines along the whole 663 yards (606 m), and will additionally be electrified with a 25 kV overhead catenary by the 2030s.

== History ==
The first railway in the area was the Manchester and Leeds Railway (M&L) which passed Huddersfield 3.25 miles (5.23 km) to the north. Initially, the operators of that line were reluctant to provide a route into Huddersfield from the north, but in the face of opposing railway companies submitting bills through Parliament, the M&L optioned their own scheme which would have taken a route along the valley floor, thus making any station a dead-end as it could not rise to the height needed to exit the valley to the south or west. A joint scheme between the M&L and the Huddersfield and Manchester Railway proposed the alternative elevated route and built the Huddersfield Viaduct to a length of 663 yards (606 m), (Note: According to trackmaps, the viaduct extends for 29 chains (1,900 ft; 580 m).) with 47 spans, 45 of which are masonry spans, whilst two have iron decks over major roads beneath the viaduct. Forty-three of the spans are square on to the roads they cross, but four are set at oblique angles. Most of the arched spans are 30 feet (9.1 m) across, although one of the skewed bridge sections measures 57 feet (17 m) across. Whilst it is debated who was the engineer on the project, it was either Thomas Nicholson or A. S. Jee, who both worked on bridges and viaducts on the line between Stalybridge and Heaton Lodge Junction. (Note: Historic England state it was possibly Nicholson, whilst Biddle and Marshall state it was Jee.) Marshall states that Jee was the engineer, being appointed in July 1845, with Nowell & Hattersley being the contractors who started work on 10 October 1845.

The viaduct was opened up to traffic in August 1847, with only a single line connecting Huddersfield with Heaton Lodge Junction on the Manchester and Leeds line through the Calder Valley. Construction of the viaduct started in 1845, but it was delayed in opening as it had to be re-profiled due to there being some error in achieving the correct gradients, and the entire track had to be taken up and replaced as the contractors had used the wrong size of sleeper despite it being stipulated quite clearly in the contract. The gradient out of the station was 1-105, which was thought to be dangerous, so the gradient was re-profiled to 1-in-350 by raising the end of the viaduct. This added an extra £1,000 (equivalent to £115,000 in 2023) on the existing cost of building the viaduct, which brought the total spent on the venture to £49,000 (equivalent to £5,656,000 in 2023).

Initially, the west end of the viaduct (that nearest the railway station) had two lines, which widened to accommodate four lines. However, in 1883, the entire structure was widened to take five lines between Huddersfield and the yards and depot at Hillhouse, using stone which had been quarried from Springwood Cutting (west of Huddersfield station) when the lines there were also being widened to four tracks. The cost of widening the viaduct was £50,000 (equivalent to £6,361,000 in 2023). During the widening process, other schemes were also implemented, including changing the arched span over John William Street to an iron span without the arched sides for full headway, the removal of goods sidings to the yard at Hillhouse, and the "...discontinuance of any buildings under the arches of the Huddersfield Viaduct south of Bradford Road....". The span over Bradford Road was widened using an iron deck on either side of the stone viaduct. When seen from ground level, the original two-track width stone arch is visible, encased in iron spans at the top. A reduction in traffic between Heaton Lodge Junction and Huddersfield resulted in the tracks between the two points being reduced from four down to two in 1970.

The viaduct also had a signal box (Huddersfield No. 2 Signal Box), which was about 100 yards (91 m) east of the station. The viaduct crosses over several roads, the Huddersfield Ring Road, the A641 Bradford Road, and numerous minor roads, but also historically bridged several tram lines and the level road-running industrial line to Huddersfield gas works. In the Kirklees area, Huddersfield Viaduct is less well-known than some of the other railway viaducts (such as Crimble, Golcar, Denby Dale, Slaithwaite, Lockwood and Penistone), as they are significantly higher, but Huddersfield Viaduct is the longest. The maximum height that the viaduct reaches is 53 feet (16 m) with the tallest arches being at the northern end of the viaduct in Hillhouse. The land falls away from south to north, undulating as it does so, so the shallowest arch is that nearest the station in Huddersfield, but the height of the structure varies along its course.

The viaduct had a new bridge deck built upon it during an engineering blockade over the Easter bank holiday weekend of 2024, in preparation for the lines on the viaduct being expanded from two lines to four as part of the Trans-Pennine Route Upgrade (TRU). Other works on the viaduct as part of the TRU will include extending the platforms at Huddersfield onto the viaduct, the replacement of corroded wrought iron decks with concrete supports, and the overhead line equipment (OLE), which will be supported by masts fixed to the outside of the viaduct between spans 1 and 33, thereafter, the OLE will be fixed onto the deck of the viaduct. (Note: Spans are counted from the station towards the North-East direction, so the span over John William Street at the station end of the viaduct is span number 1, and then each span increases in number until number 47 which is at Hillhouse.) Five lines will run onto the viaduct directly from the station, and these will combine into four tracks by span 17, all along the rest of the viaduct north-eastwards. From the west side of the viaduct to the east side, the lines will be Down Slow, Up Slow, Down Fast, and Up Fast.

The viaduct was grade II listed in 1978 and also forms part of the Huddersfield Town Conservation area at the south-western end of the viaduct.

== Accidents ==
- On 20 August 1865, the coupling broke on some empty coaches at Lockwood, and they ran downhill through Huddersfield being wrecked on one of the parapets of the viaduct.
- On 21 April 1905, an LNWR empty coaching stock train ran through red lights and onto the same track as an approaching L&YR train from Bradford, and two people died.
- On 6 November 1989, two trains collided head-on at the western end of the viaduct. Twenty-eight people were injured.

== See also ==
- Listed buildings in Huddersfield (Newsome Ward - central area)
