= Netherton railway station (Kirklees) =

Disused railway station in Netherton, Kirklees

Netherton

General information
- Location: Netherton, Kirklees; England
- Coordinates: 53.6125°N 1.8151°W
- Grid reference: SE123128
- Platforms: 1

Other information
- Status: Disused

History
- Original company: Lancashire and Yorkshire Railway
- Pre-grouping: Lancashire and Yorkshire Railway
- Post-grouping: London, Midland and Scottish Railway

Key dates
- 5 July 1869: Opened
- 23 May 1949: Closed
Location

Netherton railway station served the village of Netherton, Kirklees, England, from 1869 to 1949 on the Meltham branch line.

== History ==
The station was opened on 5 July 1869 on the Lancashire and Yorkshire Railway. It closed on 23 May 1949.

Preceding station	Disused railways	Following station
Woodfield; Line and station closed	Lancashire and Yorkshire Railway; Meltham branch line	Healey House; Line and station closed
