= Meltham railway station (England) =

Disused railway station in West Yorkshire, England

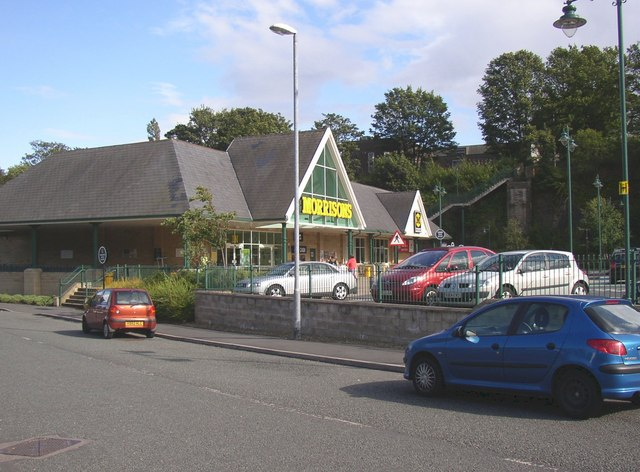
- Morrison's supermarket, Meltham

General information
- Location: Meltham, West Yorkshire; England
- Coordinates: 53.593°N 1.850°W
- Grid reference: SE099107
- Platforms: 1
- Tracks: 3

History
- Pre-grouping: Lancashire & Yorkshire Railway
- Post-grouping: London Midland Scottish Railway

Key dates
- August 1868: Opened to goods
- September 1868: Closed temporarily
- February 1869: Re-opened to Goods
- 5 July 1869: Opened to Passengers
- 23 May 1949: Closed to passengers
- 3 April 1965: closed completely
Location

Meltham railway station was the terminus of the Meltham branch line from Lockwood (Huddersfield) to Meltham in the West Riding of Yorkshire, England. Traffic partially started in 1868 but became regular in July 1869. The station and line were opened by the Lancashire & Yorkshire Railway (L&YR), later becoming part of the London Midland Scottish Railway. The station closed to passengers in 1949, though the branch remained open to freight until the 1960s. The railway station site is now the location of a supermarket.

== History ==
The branch line to Meltham from Lockwood was opened in August 1868 by the Lancashire & Yorkshire Railway but was closed soon after an embankment collapsed. It re-opened to freight in February 1869 and finally to a regular passenger service in July 1869. Over 2,000 tickets were sold at Meltham station alone during the first week of the opening. Although the terminus had three sidings serving it, only the northernmost line had a platform.

The town had an extensive goods yard on a lower level to the station and away from the terminus to the east. It had at least seven sidings and a two-road goods shed. The station was listed as able to handle livestock, vans, horse boxes, general goods, and coal. It had a steam crane with a maximum lifting weight of 10 tonnes (11 tons). In 1922, the L&YR merged into the London and North Western Railway (LNWR), and a year later, it became a major constituent of the London Midland Scottish Railway (LMS).

The station was closed to passenger traffic in May 1949. The line remained open for goods well into the 1960s, and occasional special passenger trains were run on the line, such as in June 1950, when 800 schoolchildren went on a trip to London from the station. The station's site is now a supermarket and the former railway line trackbed is used as cycle path 689 to Lockwood.

== Services ==
The timetable for 1877 shows six daily workings along the line, all of which originated and terminated at Bradford Exchange. These services ran via Huddersfield, Mirfield, and Cleckheaton Central. By 1906, this had been extended to twelve services a day in each direction, though most services ran through to Bradford, two of those run via the Pickle Bridge line, with the rest going via Cleckheaton Central (the Spen Valley Line).

By 1939, when the LMS was running the services, the number of trains had increased to 15, with some originating at Bradford Exchange, others at Huddersfield, two from Halifax, and one from Wakefield Kirkgate. The timetable for 1944, five years before closure, shows seven daily out-and-back workings from Bradford Exchange via the Spen Valley Line, with the first service of the day only running to and from Huddersfield.

Preceding station	Disused railways	Following station
Meltham Mills Halt; Line and station closed	Lancashire and Yorkshire Railway; Meltham branch line	Terminus; Line and station closed
