= Transpennine Route Upgrade =

Major upgrade of the railway between Manchester, Leeds, and York

Overview
- Status: Under construction
- Owner: Network Rail
- Locale: Northern England
- Termini: Manchester Victoria; York
- Stations: 23
- Website: https://thetrupgrade.co.uk/

Service
- System: National Rail
- Operators: TransPennine Express; Northern Trains

History
- Work began: 2015
- Planned opening: 2036–2041

Technical
- Line length: 122 km (76 mi)
- Track gauge: 1,435 mm (4 ft 8 1/2 in) standard gauge
- Loading gauge: W12
- Electrification: 25 kV 50 Hz AC overhead line
- Signalling: ETCS Level 2

The Transpennine Route Upgrade (TRU) is a major project to upgrade the railway between Manchester and York via Huddersfield and Leeds in the north of England. The 76-mile (122 km) railway over the Pennines, consisting mostly of the Huddersfield line, is heavily used but is slow and lacks capacity. It has Victorian infrastructure, traverses difficult terrain including the 3-mile (4.8 km) Standedge Tunnel, and lacks electrification. The TRU aims to increase capacity by adding extra track, electrifying the entire route, introducing digital signalling, and upgrading stations.

The £11.5 billion programme consists of a succession of sub-projects designed to give incremental benefits to rail users over a period of time, with an anticipated overall completion date of between 2036 and 2041. Following completion of the upgrade trains will be able to run at top speeds of 125 mph (200 km/h). The number of fast trains between Manchester and Leeds is to increase from two to up to six per hour, and journey times will be reduced from 50 to 42 minutes. Freight capacity will also increase.

== Background ==
Map of the Trans-Pennine Routes. The TRU relates to the Huddersfield line, shown in light blue.

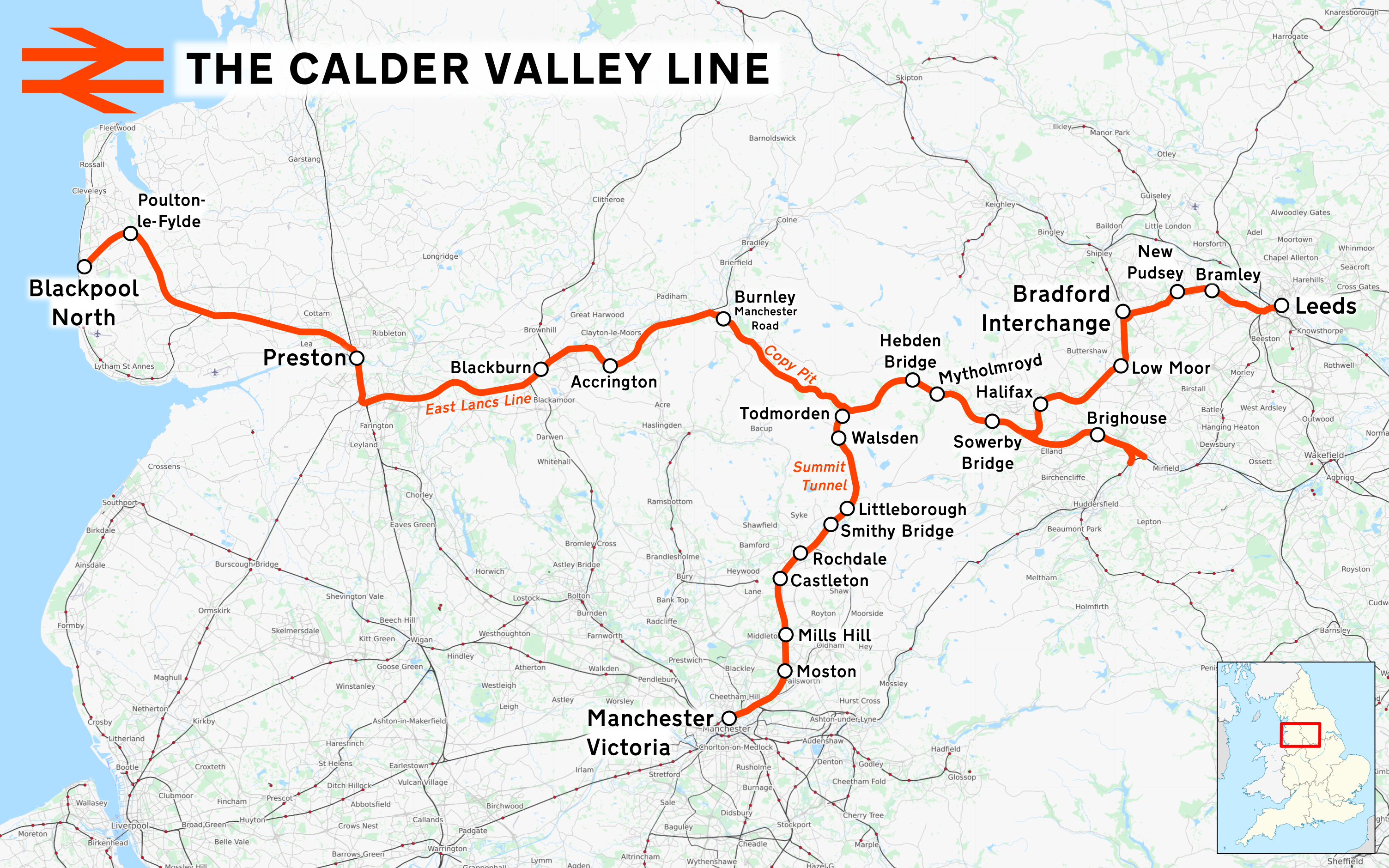
Calder Valley line for comparison

It is widely accepted that there is a North–South divide in England, with government spending per person on drivers of growth such as transport infrastructure being far higher in the South-East than the North. Despite linking two key population centres, passenger service on the railway line between Manchester and York via Leeds, used by up to 50 million passengers per year, is widely considered unsatisfactory in terms of journey time, frequency, punctuality and level of passenger comfort. At its worst, 15% of passengers had to stand in peak times. The mixed-traffic route suffers from significant capacity constraints, as additional fast, semi-fast, and stopping services cannot reliably be accommodated due to inadequate track layouts and a lack of grade separation.

=== Transpennine connectivity ===
Since the closure of the Woodhead line, there are three transpennine rail lines connecting Lancashire and Yorkshire. To the south of the Huddersfield line is the Hope Valley Line which traverses even more difficult terrain including the 3.5-mile (5.6 km) Totley Tunnel, and which in 2021 was allocated £137 million investment to improve capacity and connectivity between Manchester and Sheffield. To the north, the Calder Valley line connects Manchester and Leeds via Rochdale and Bradford, where trains have to reverse.

The equivalent transpennine road link is the M62 motorway, which provides the most practical route for heavy goods vehicles and other commercial traffic between Manchester and Leeds, as well as to and from the ports at Merseyside and the Humber. However, the section between junctions 18 and 29 through Greater Manchester and West Yorkshire has been identified as one of the most congested roads in Britain. The UK government has long recognised the advantages of modal shift from road to rail.

== History ==
=== 2011–2021: Announcement and initial works ===
The initial proposal to electrify the line from Manchester Victoria to Leeds via Huddersfield was announced in the 2011 Autumn Statement by the Chancellor of the Exchequer. The cost was cited as £290 million and the project was planned to start in 2014. In the 2012 High Level Output Specification (HLOS), it was announced there would be additional electrification from Leeds to Selby.

In November 2014, the deputy prime minister Nick Clegg reported on the government's desire to see the whole route from Manchester to Hull upgraded and electrified. In March 2015, Chancellor George Osborne announced there would be an additional rolling programme of improvement and electrification to Hull. All work on the project was paused in June 2015 by the Secretary of State for Transport, but works resumed in September 2015.

Construction works began in March 2015 on the route between Leeds and York, and in Tameside between Manchester Victoria and Stalybridge. Further civil engineering contracts were awarded in 2017. On a visit to Leeds on 2 March 2018, Transport Secretary Chris Grayling said the upgrade would continue, with phased works expected to cause significant disruption over a five year period from 2019.

=== 2021–2026: Approval and subsequent construction ===
An order under the Transport and Works Act 1992 (TWAO) for works between Manchester Victoria and York was published by Network Rail in March 2021. On 5 October 2021, Proofs of Evidence for the order were submitted by Network Rail to the Department for Transport.

In 2021, the government allocated £589 million of funding for the section between Huddersfield and Leeds. On 26 May 2021, it was confirmed that a further £317 million was being spent on the upgrade, and electrification of the line between York and Church Fenton was confirmed, although Network Rail had already started to install masts for overhead line electrification (OLE) on this route in February 2021. On 4 June 2021, it was confirmed that the £317 million was in addition to the £589 million previously announced and further confirmed that electrification would go from Huddersfield to Leeds. It was also stated that work would begin immediately.

On 18 November 2021, the Integrated Rail Plan for the North and Midlands (IRP) was published. The IRP included a commitment to the TRU, with full electrification of the route and gauge clearance works to W12 loading gauge to accommodate 2.9 m × 2.6 m (9.5 ft × 8.5 ft) shipping containers throughout. The completion date for all works was cited as 2032. The IRP significantly curtailed other rail projects planned for the north of England; the eastern leg of High Speed 2 to Leeds was cancelled and proposals for Northern Powerhouse Rail between Manchester and Leeds were scaled back, with a new line from Manchester instead connecting with the upgraded Huddersfield Line at Marsden.

On 27 June 2022, the Secretary of State for Transport's decision to grant the Order under the Transport and Works Act (the TWAO) for the section between Huddersfield and Dewsbury was published. This was followed by announcement of a further £959 million in funding for the project in July 2022. The leaders of the project held a round table conference in November 2022, discussing progress and strategy for keeping disruption to a minimum.

On 14 January 2026, Chancellor Rachel Reeves committed a further £1.1 billion in funding for the project over the Spending Review Period to 2029.

== Route ==
=== Overview ===
The TRU has promised to deliver significant improvements to the railway between Manchester Victoria, Leeds, and York. Additional tracks will be built in several places, along with grade separation of key junctions, track remodelling, and other renewals. The route will be electrified throughout and signalling will be upgraded. Several stations will be rebuilt or upgraded to provide additional platforms, step-free access, and to accommodate longer trains.

The route has 285 overbridges and 6 miles (9.7 km) of tunnels including Standedge Tunnel. There are a total of 23 stations including the Grade I listed Huddersfield station, and major viaducts at Dewsbury, Batley, Milnsbridge and Huddersfield. Nine structures along the route require listed building approval.

The Transport Works Act Order published in March 2021 split the project into 11 sections. Expected completion dates for each section were published by Transport for the North in 2024.

Sector	Location	Progress	Completion/Target Date	Details
Manchester–Huddersfield
W1	Manchester Victoria–Stalybridge	Complete	2025	Line speed increases and electrification.
W2a	Stalybridge station	Complete	2025	Remodelling of the station layout and electrification
W2b	Stalybridge–Marsden	Planning	2032	Line speed increases and electrification. Station upgrades.
W2c	Marsden–Huddersfield	Planning	2032	Line speed increases and electrification. Additional third track. Station upgrades.
Huddersfield–Leeds
W3	Huddersfield–Ravensthorpe	Construction	2030	Line speed increases and electrification. Additional pair of tracks. Grade separation and junction remodelling. Major rebuild of Huddersfield and Ravensthorpe stations. Station upgrades.
W4	Ravensthorpe–Leeds	Construction	2030	Line speed increases and electrification. Station upgrades.
W5	Morley station	Complete	2025	Station upgrade.
Leeds–York
E1	Church Fenton–York	Complete	2025	Line speed increases and electrification.
E2	Leeds station	Planning	N/K	Station improvements.
E3	Crossgates–Micklefield	Construction	2030	Line speed increases and electrification.
E4	Micklefield–Church Fenton	Construction	2030	Line speed increases and electrification. Level crossing closures.

=== Manchester–Huddersfield ===
Projects W2b and W2c concern the Stalybridge to Marsden and Marsden to Huddersfield sections. These include track realignment between Stalybridge and Diggle, and the provision of a bi-directional third track to act as a "Crawler Lane" for freight trains climbing up from Huddersfield to Marsden.

A number of bridges are being upgraded and strengthened as part of the project. In the Manchester area they include the bridge at Dantzic Street in the centre of Manchester. In the Miles Platting area, Queens Road bridge is being modified, as is the Bromley Street subway and Oldham Road bridge. In Ashton-under-Lyne in the Southampton Street and Granville Street area, overbridges were raised in April and May 2022.

Campaigners have called for bridges to be provided in place of level crossings proposed for closure, where alternative routes are longer, hazardous or difficult to negotiate.

=== Huddersfield–Leeds ===
The planned upgrade of the 8-mile (13 km) section between Huddersfield and Westtown (Dewsbury) is of particular significance. It is the best place on the route to provide a facility for fast trains to overtake slower ones, by increasing the number of tracks from two to four. Also, by building a bridge that will provide grade separation at Thornhill L.N.W. Junction, it will eliminate conflicts between trains travelling along the Calder valley between Brighouse and Wakefield and those travelling between Huddersfield and Leeds.

Between Huddersfield and Ravensthorpe, 12 bridges will be demolished and replaced, a small number will be adapted, and one will be removed altogether. Lady Anne level crossing will be closed and replaced with a new footbridge.

=== Leeds–York ===
Projects E2, E3, and E4 will lead to reduced journey times between Leeds and Church Fenton, with improvements at Leeds station, electrification, and capacity improvements including reduced conflicts around Neville Hill depot.

Several level crossings will be closed and replaced. In Garforth, Barrowby Lane foot level crossing will be closed and replaced with an accessible footbridge. In Church Fenton, three level crossings will be closed and replaced with one new road bridge to allow an extension of the Church Fenton passing loop. The new bridge, west of the current Rose Lane level crossing, will maintain access to homes on Rose Lane after the level crossing closure. A TWAO application to close Copmanthorpe level crossing was withdrawn by Network Rail pending further consultation on accessible solutions.

To accommodate electrification of the line, a number of overbridges will be raised, replaced, or removed. The Grade II listed Crawshaw Woods Bridge will be restored; the cast-iron spans will be refurbished off-site while the stone abutments are raised to create sufficient clearance for electrification.

== Electrification ==
The route will be fully electrified with 25 kV AC overhead lines between Manchester and York. This involves electrification of the Huddersfield Line from Manchester Victoria to Leeds, where the station is already electrified, and Leeds to Colton Junction, where the Huddersfield Line meets the electrified East Coast Main Line.

Manchester Victoria had already had electrification equipment installed as part of the precursor North West electrification programme. As Huddersfield station is a Grade I listed building, a bespoke OLE design will be used in place of standard overhead gantries.

=== Power supply ===
The electrical power for the scheme on the west side of the scheme is being provided from the grid feeder in the Stalybridge area at Heyrod. It was visited by Jonathan Reynolds, the local MP for the constituency on 27 May 2016. A Static Frequency Converter will be built in the vicinity of Ravensthorpe in place of a normal grid feeder station.

== Resignalling ==
The route between Manchester and York will be upgraded to use ETCS Level 2 in-cab digital signalling. At the western end of the route, ETCS provision will begin at Ashton-under-Lyne station and Guide Bridge North junction as an ETCS Overlay, meaning colour light signals will be retained. Signals will be removed from the eastern end of Stalybridge tunnel onwards, with the route towards Leeds operating fully under ETCS. The eastern end of ETCS provision will be at Colton South junction. The Leeds station area between Copley Hill junction and Neville Hill West junction will be excepted from ETCS.

ETCS development is planned to take place between 2026 and 2028, with installation beginning in 2029. Commissioning and removal of colour light signals is planned to take place in phases between 2032 and 2039.

== Stations ==
As part of the upgrade, 11 stations along the route will require a review of options for persons of reduced mobility such as step-free access and other enhancements.

=== Huddersfield ===
A major upgrade of Huddersfield station is required to support the future service pattern proposed by the TRU. Works will create additional 200 m (660 ft) through platforms, a new accessible footbridge, and an extended passenger subway. Remodelling of the current bay platforms will require the demolition of parts of the station roof. New platform canopies will be built for the remodelled platforms, and the remaining section of the historic roof will be refurbished and strengthened.

== Construction ==
=== Manchester–Huddersfield ===
In 2021, preparatory work for electrification to Stalybridge was done in the Miles Platting area for electrification to Stalybridge. A total blockade took place on the route between Manchester Victoria and Stalybridge between 31 July and 15 August 2021 to allow track remodelling and bridge strengthening works to take place. Installation of overhead line equipment between Manchester Victoria and Stalybridge began in November 2022.

In April 2023, a 26-day blockade of Stalybridge station took place for major upgrades and renewals, including the installation of OLE through the station. An electric train successfully completed a test run between Manchester Victoria and Stalybridge on 13 March 2024, and regular electric services commenced on 3 December 2024 with TransPennine Express Class 802 bi-mode trains.

=== Huddersfield–Leeds ===
Morley station was rebuilt during a succession of blockades from February to June 2023. The rebuilt station opened on 26 June 2023 after the final 9-day blockade.

In April 2024, a ten-day closure of Huddersfield station was completed, although work on the roof was postponed due to high winds.

In May 2025, six new sidings were opened on the site of Healey Mills Marshalling Yard to act as a local distribution centre for construction materials needed in the upgrade.

On 29 September 2025, Huddersfield station reopened in a temporary state after a 30-day blockade to rebuild part of the station. The interim layout allows remodelling works to continue while the station is operational. In the interim configuration, the station is operating with two through platforms and one bay platform for services on the Penistone Line. Several stopping services were temporarily diverted or cancelled as a consequence of the reduction in the number of available platforms.

Mirfield station was partially rebuilt in 2025, reopening with a temporary configuration on 27 December 2025 after a 5-day blockade.

In September 2026, a 16-day blockade of Huddersfield station took place, with works focusing on track renewals through the Springwood Tunnels in preparation for electrification of the southern station approach. OLE masts were also installed on the Huddersfield Viaduct to the north of the station. Construction continued on the new through platforms, footbridge, and canopies.

=== Leeds–York ===
OLE between Church Fenton and Colton Junction was energised in July 2024. The Church Fenton to York section was officially completed in August 2025.

== Rolling stock ==
In September 2026, it was announced that Alstom would build 29 Adessia Stream battery electric multiple units for TransPennine Express services on the upgraded line. The units will replace part of the existing TPE Class 185 fleet on services from Liverpool and Manchester to York, Hull, Scarborough, and Saltburn. Charging infrastructure will be installed at Hull, Scarborough, and Saltburn to allow battery operation on non-electrified lines. The 121-metre (397 ft), 5–car units will allow level boarding, have around 300 seats, and will operate at up to 110 miles per hour (180 km/h). The units will be built at Alstom's Derby factory from 2028, and are intended to begin testing from 2032 before entry into service in 2034. The £1 billion contract with Alstom includes construction and maintenance of the units over an 8–year period.

== Funding ==
In 2018, the upgrade was estimated to cost £2.9–3.1 billion. The estimated cost increased to £11.5 billion by 2022 due to delays and significant expansion of the project's scope. The additional funding will be drawn from the £96 billion made available by the Integrated Rail Plan in 2021.

In November 2023, a freedom of information request uncovered by The Northern Agenda newsletter revealed that the government-operated TransPennine Express spent almost £2 million securing advertising for the TRU in 2022/23.

== Benefits ==
On completion, TRU aims to deliver substantial improvements to passenger journeys and rail freight between Manchester, Leeds, and York. Passenger services will be faster and more frequent, with TRU supporting six fast/semi-fast services and two stopping services per hour between Manchester and Leeds. Services will benefit from increased reliability on the route as a result of electrification, resignalling, and infrastructure improvements.

Station upgrades will deliver accessibility improvements, and new rolling stock will facilitate level boarding at stations along the route. Electrification of the route will contribute to decarbonisation of the rail network, with early benefits for bi-mode trains able to use electric traction between Manchester Victoria and Stalybridge and between Church Fenton and York from December 2024.

Through investment in the region's rail network, TRU aims to deliver wider social and economic benefits across the north of England.

== Alternative proposals ==
=== Northern Powerhouse Rail ===
Northern Powerhouse Rail (NPR) was established in 2014 to substantially enhance the economy of the North of England. The original scheme proposed a new high-speed rail line from Liverpool to Leeds via Manchester and Bradford, effectively providing an additional pair of tracks for high speed services across the Pennines. However, in November 2021 the Integrated Rail Plan for the North and Midlands (IRP) significantly curtailed plans for NPR, reducing the scheme to a new line from Manchester to Marsden, on the Huddersfield Line. The IRP instead committed to the TRU, expanding its scope to include electrification of the Huddersfield Line between Manchester and York via Leeds and clearance to W12 loading gauge throughout.

Subsequent proposals for NPR, announced in January 2026, ruled out a new railway between Manchester and Leeds. Phase 3 of NPR will instead improve transpennine connectivity by building on the improvements delivered by the TRU.

=== Reopening proposals ===
Reopening the Woodhead line as a potential alternative Pennine crossing was ruled out early on. The Skipton–East Lancashire Rail Action Partnership is campaigning for the reopening of the 12-mile (19 km) railway line between the Lancashire town of Colne and the Yorkshire town of Skipton, which could provide an additional transpennine route for passengers and freight.

== Timeline ==
- November 2011: Autumn statement announcing electrification of the line
- July 2012: Addition of Leeds to Selby announced as part of HLOS
- November 2014: Deputy prime minister states government's desire for the whole route to be electrified
- March 2015: Civil engineering including overbridge raising works start at various places
- March 2015: Chancellor announces extra electrification from Selby to Hull
- June 2015: work on the whole scheme paused by Secretary of State for Transport
- September 2015: work on the scheme resumed
- August 2016: GRIP 1 complete
- December 2016: GRIP 2 complete
- March 2017: various civil engineering contracts awarded
- December 2017: GRIP 3 complete
- March 2018: Transport Secretary confirms work on the upgrade would continue
- January 2021: Piling commences in two locations along the route
- March 2021: Transport Works Act Order published
- 4 June 2021: Confirmation of £317 million extra funding and work to begin immediately.
- 18 November 2021: The Integrated Rail Plan is published committing to the full upgrade and electrification.
- 27 June 2022: Yes decision published by the Department of Transport for the Ravensthorpe TWAO (W3).
- 19 July 2022: House of Commons announcement by the Secretary of State for Transport that another £959 million of funding had been made available for the project.
- 20 July 2022: National Audit Office publish a report into the upgrade saying the case had been firmly made for the upgrade but risks remain, money had been wasted, and was critical of the DfT taking so long to agree the scope of the works.
- January 2023: Announcement of a new managing director for the route upgrade project
- 17 July 2023: Application for a TWAO made for the Leeds to Micklefield section of the upgrade including compulsory land purchases.
- 4 December 2023: Announcement of £3.9 billion being injected to speed up the scheme and bring Hull into the scope.
- 22 March 2024: Screening TWAO for Stalybridge to Standedge tunnel eastern portal published stating no further environmental impact screening necessary.
- February - March 2024: Leeds to Micklefield Enhancements TWA Order Public Enquiry held
- April 2024: Church Fenton Level Crossing Reduction TWA Order came into force
- 12 September 2024: A consortium including BAM and Amey announced as contractors for the section of the upgrade between Leeds and Huddersfield including signalling for 28 route miles (45 km)
- 1 October 2024: The TWAO for the Leeds-Micklefield section of the upgrade is published.
- October 2024: The October 2024 budget the new government confirmed support for the upgrade project.
- 10 February 2025: AtkinsRealis selected as the main contractor for the W2B and W2C route sections of the upgrade.
- February 2025: Details of the section W2B Stalybridge to Diggle (Saddleworth) scheme and TWAO application published.
- August 2025: Church Fenton to York section announced as officially complete.
- 29 September 2025: Huddersfield station reopens in a temporary state after a 30-day blockade to rebuild part of the station.
- 27 December 2025: Mirfield station rebuilt after a 5-day blockade.

== See also ==
- Felixstowe to Nuneaton railway upgrade
- Great Western Main Line upgrade
- High Speed 2
- List of proposed railway electrification routes in Great Britain
- Midland Main Line upgrade
- North West England electrification schemes
- Northern Powerhouse Rail
- Railway electrification in Scotland
- West Coast Main Line route modernisation
