= Healey House railway station =

Disused railway station in Healey, Kirklees

Coordinates: 53.606°N 1.827°W

Healey

General information
- Location: Healey, West Riding of Yorkshire; England
- Platforms: 1

Other information
- Status: Disused

History
- Original company: Lancashire and Yorkshire Railway
- Pre-grouping: Lancashire and Yorkshire Railway
- Post-grouping: London, Midland and Scottish Railway

Key dates
- 6 July 1869: Opened
- 23 May 1949: Closed
Location

Healey House railway station was in use from 1869 to 1949 on the Meltham branch line.

== History ==
The station was opened on 6 July 1869 by the Lancashire and Yorkshire Railway. It had two sidings nearby which were used during the Second World War to store chemical tankers, which were then taken to the ICI works in Huddersfield to create explosives. The station closed on 23 May 1949.

Preceding station	Disused railways	Following station
Netherton; Line and station closed	Lancashire and Yorkshire Railway; Meltham branch line	Meltham Mills Halt; Line and station closed
