= Woodfield railway station (Yorkshire) =

Short-lived railway station in Lockwood, Kirklees, England

Woodfield

General information
- Location: Lockwood, Kirklees; England
- Coordinates: 53.627601°N 1.806193°W
- Grid reference: SE12911458

Other information
- Status: Disused

History
- Original company: Lancashire and Yorkshire Railway
- Pre-grouping: Lancashire and Yorkshire Railway

Key dates
- 1 June 1874: Opened
- 1 July 1874: Closed
Location

Woodfield railway station served the area of Lockwood, Kirklees, England, in 1874 on the Meltham branch line.

== History ==
The station was opened on 1 June 1874 by the Lancashire and Yorkshire Railway after the Board of Trade dispensed with their usual requirement of a months' notice in order to carry out an inspection. It was an extremely short-lived station, only being open to the public for one month before closing on 1 July 1874. An inspection carried out by Colonel Hutchinson on 3 June had highlighted the fact that the station had been built on an unsafe 1-in-60 gradient falling towards Huddersfield. His written report recommended that the risk of runaway rolling stock should be alleviated by "doubling the line at the station and placing a outer siding below the station on the ascending line, or by flattening the gradient at the station. [...] Until these requirements have been complied with I cannot recommend the Board of Trade to sanction the use of Woodfield Station.". Upon receipt of the report, the Board of Trade withdrew their approval and ordered a closure notice.

Preceding station	Disused railways	Following station
Lockwood; Line closed, station open	Lancashire and Yorkshire Railway; Meltham branch line	Netherton; Line and station closed
