= Denby Dale railway station =

Railway station in West Yorkshire, England

Denby Dale
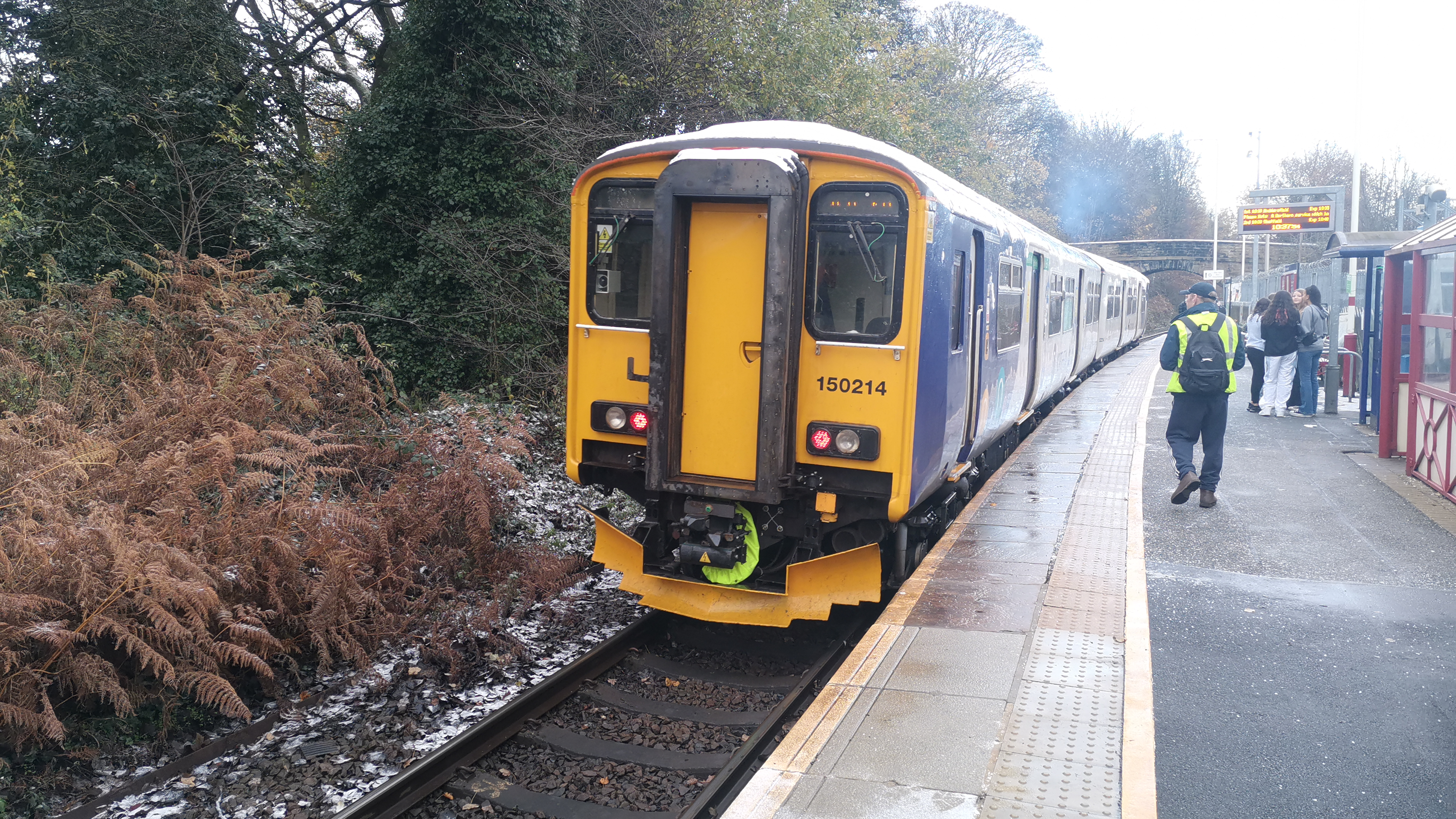
- The platform

General information
- Location: Denby Dale, Kirklees; England
- Coordinates: 53.572670°N 1.663050°W
- Grid reference: SE224085
- Manager: Northern Trains
- Transit authority: West Yorkshire (Metro)
- Platforms: 1

Other information
- Station code: DBD
- Fare zone: 5(WYPTE) & Barnsley(SYPTE)
- Classification: DfT category F1

History
- Opened: 1 July 1850; 176 years ago

Passengers
- 2020/21: ▼37,028
- 2021/22: ▲0.119 million
- 2022/23: ▼0.100 million
- 2023/24: ▼94,434
- 2024/25: ▲0.108 million
Location
Notes
- Passenger statistics from the Office of Rail and Road

Denby Dale railway station serves the village of Denby Dale and the surrounding area, in West Yorkshire, England. It lies on the Penistone Line, 9.5 miles (15 km) south-east of Huddersfield, and is operated by Northern Trains.

== History ==
Opened by the Huddersfield & Sheffield Junction Railway in 1850, which subsequently became part of the Lancashire & Yorkshire Railway, it originally had two platforms but lost the northbound one when the Clayton West Junction to Penistone section was singled in 1969.

The line from the south is carried above the village on the impressive stone, 21-arch Denby Dale Viaduct, which is over 100 feet (30 m) high and is one of several such structures on the route.

== Facilities ==
The station has only a single platform; it is accessed by either a ramp from the car park or by a subway. The only remaining station buildings are in private industrial use, but there is a standard waiting shelter on the platform. Timetable information is provided on posters and passenger information displays, there are also automated announcements.

No step-free access is available to the platform. The main entrance, via the car park, has a high kerb that can cause difficulties for wheelchair users; the pedestrian subway at the south end has steps. The station is unstaffed, with a ticket machine; passengers must otherwise buy their tickets on-line prior to travel.

Denby Dale is a boundary station for both West Yorkshire PTE and South Yorkshire PTE; tickets for both Passenger Transport Executives are valid to and from this station.

== Services ==
Trains operate hourly between Huddersfield and Sheffield, via Barnsley.

Preceding station	National Rail	Following station
Penistone	Northern Trains Penistone Line	Shepley
