= Meltham branch line =

Disused railway line in West Yorkshire, England

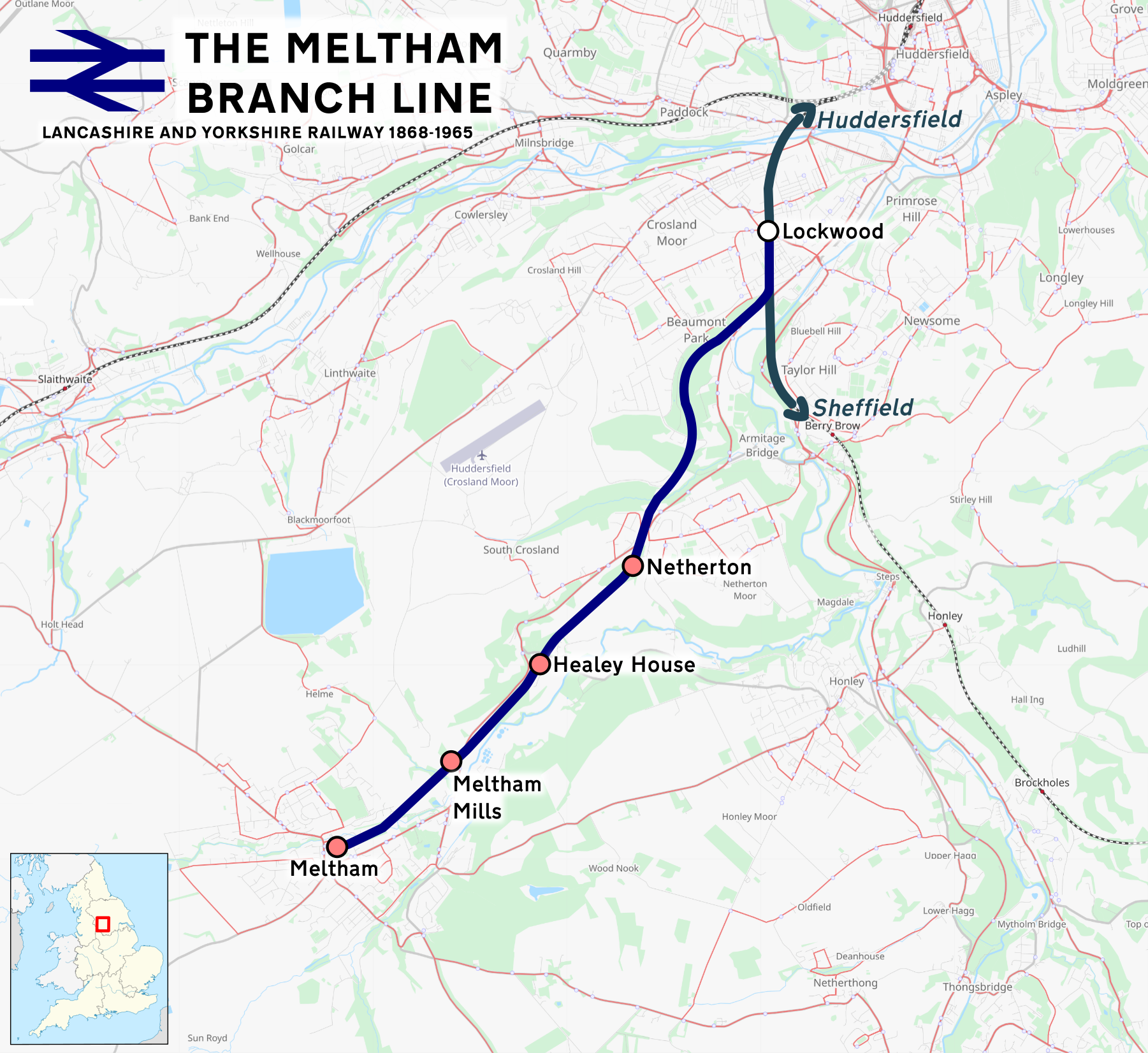
Route map (Click to expand)

The Meltham branch line is a disused railway line that ran for 3 1/2 miles (5.6 km) from Lockwood to Meltham, in West Yorkshire, England. The line was single track for its entire length. Opening to goods in 1868 and to passengers on 5 July 1869, the last regular passenger service was on 21 May 1949. It closed completely on 3 April 1965.

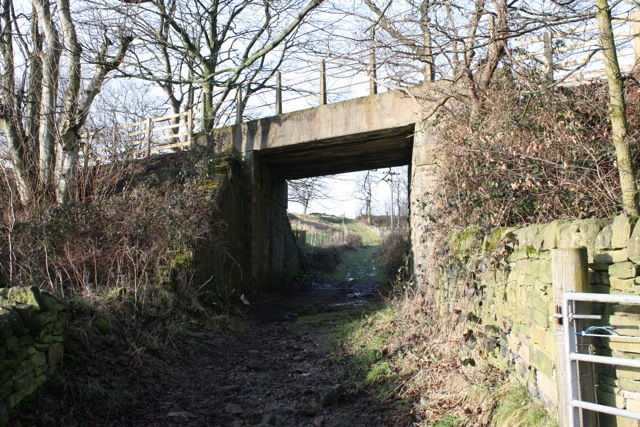
Mean Lane Bridge, Meltham branch line

== The route ==
The route began just south of Lockwood station near Lockwood Viaduct at a junction with the Penistone Line and continued as follows:

- Woodfield (Opened and closed June 1874 due to being on an unsafe gradient)
- here is Butternab Tunnel (256 yards)
- here is Netherton Tunnel (333 yards)
- Netherton
- Healey House
- here is Healey House Tunnel (30 yards)
- Meltham Mills Halt
- Meltham

== Present day ==
A new housing estate and a Morrisons supermarket have been built on the site of the Meltham station but much of the line remains. In 2004 a plan was proposed to convert much of the track bed to a cycle track to be known as the Meltham Greenway. The first section of this opened in May 2008 between Station Road in Meltham and Huddersfield Road (B6108).

In 2012, the Friends of Beaumont Park were awarded £49,900 from the Heritage Lottery Fund to carry out restoration of the section of track bed which ran along the lower end of the park and to turn it into a heritage trail. The project was completed towards the end of 2014.

Butternab Tunnels Southern Portal has been converted into an Airbnb (previously an art studio) the Northern Portal remains Bricked up with only a small crawl space entrance.

Much of the line between Butternab and Netherton Tunnel lies on private land however the trackbed remains traceable.

In 2022 the high winds caused a tree fall just outside the bricked up Northern Portal of Netherton Tunnel.

As of 2022 the Southern Portal of Netherton Tunnel remains bricked up and the station site is now being built over by a housing estate however some of the station platforms remain traceable.

Trackbed between Netherton and Healey house remains on private land albeit still traceable.

Occupation Bridge remains on the approach to Healey House however some track has been blocked off.

The 30 yard Healey House tunnel still remains at the old station site and some of the platform can still be traced. However most of the station has been overgrown. The bridge just before the station was demolished in the 1960s.

Trackbed between Healey House station towards Meltham Road is now a stream and a lot of the Trackbed then is blocked by tree falls then private land. Hall Heys Iron bridge which went over Meltham Road was demolished sometime in the 1960s.
