= Penistone Line =

Railway line between Huddersfield and Sheffield, England

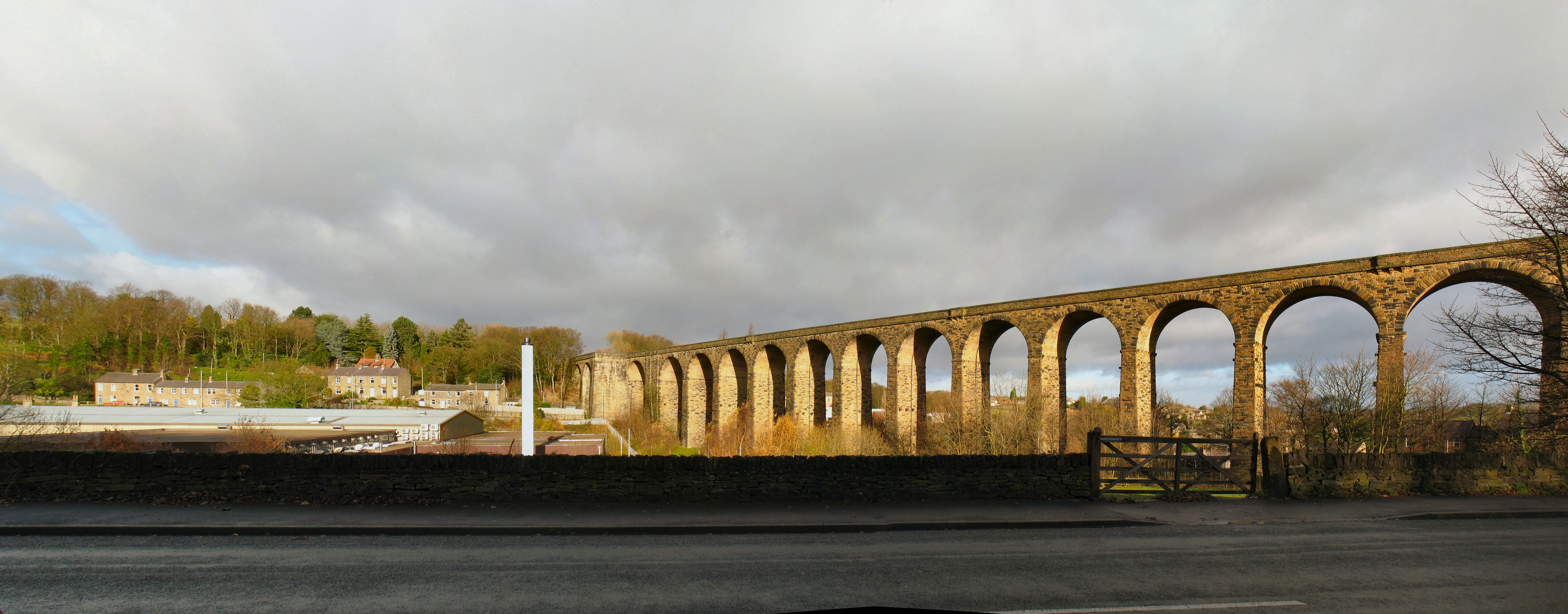
- Denby Dale Viaduct

Overview
- Status: Operational
- Owner: Network Rail
- Locale: South Yorkshire; West Yorkshire
- Termini: Huddersfield; Sheffield

Service
- Type: Heavy rail
- System: National Rail
- Operator: Northern Trains
- Rolling stock: Class 150

Technical
- Number of tracks: Single-track with passing loops
- Track gauge: 4 ft 8 1/2 in (1,435 mm) standard gauge
Route map
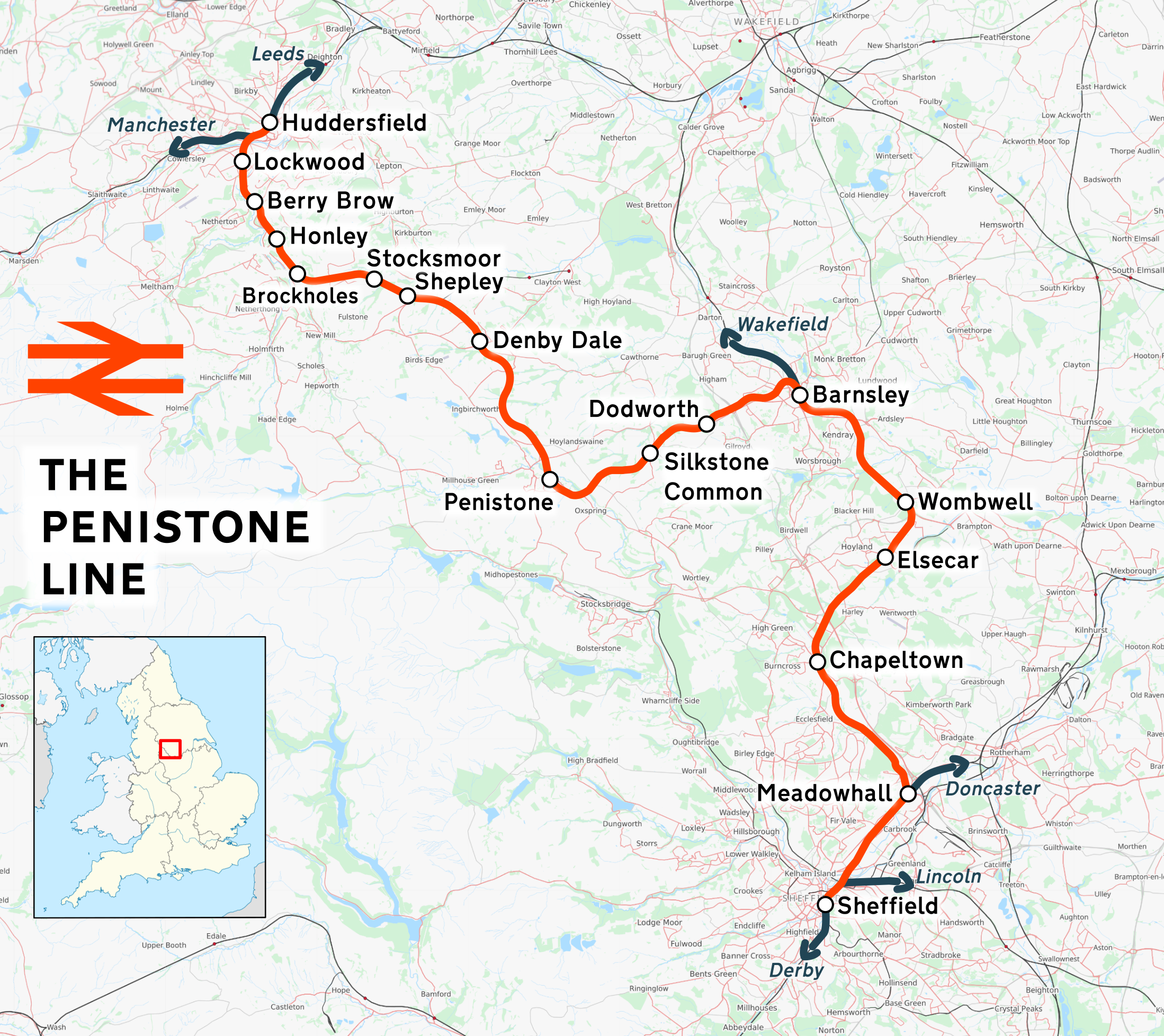
(Click to expand)

The Penistone Line is operated by Northern Trains, in the West Yorkshire Metro and South Yorkshire Mayoral Combined Authority areas of northern England. It connects Huddersfield and Sheffield, via Penistone and Barnsley, serving many rural communities. Metrocards (Zone 5) can be used for travel between Huddersfield and Denby Dale and intermediate stations.

== Line details ==
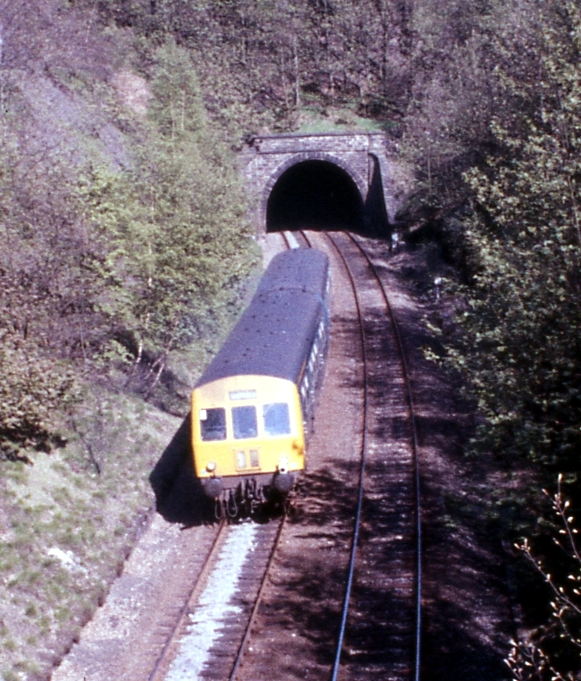
Thurstonland Tunnel, 1970s

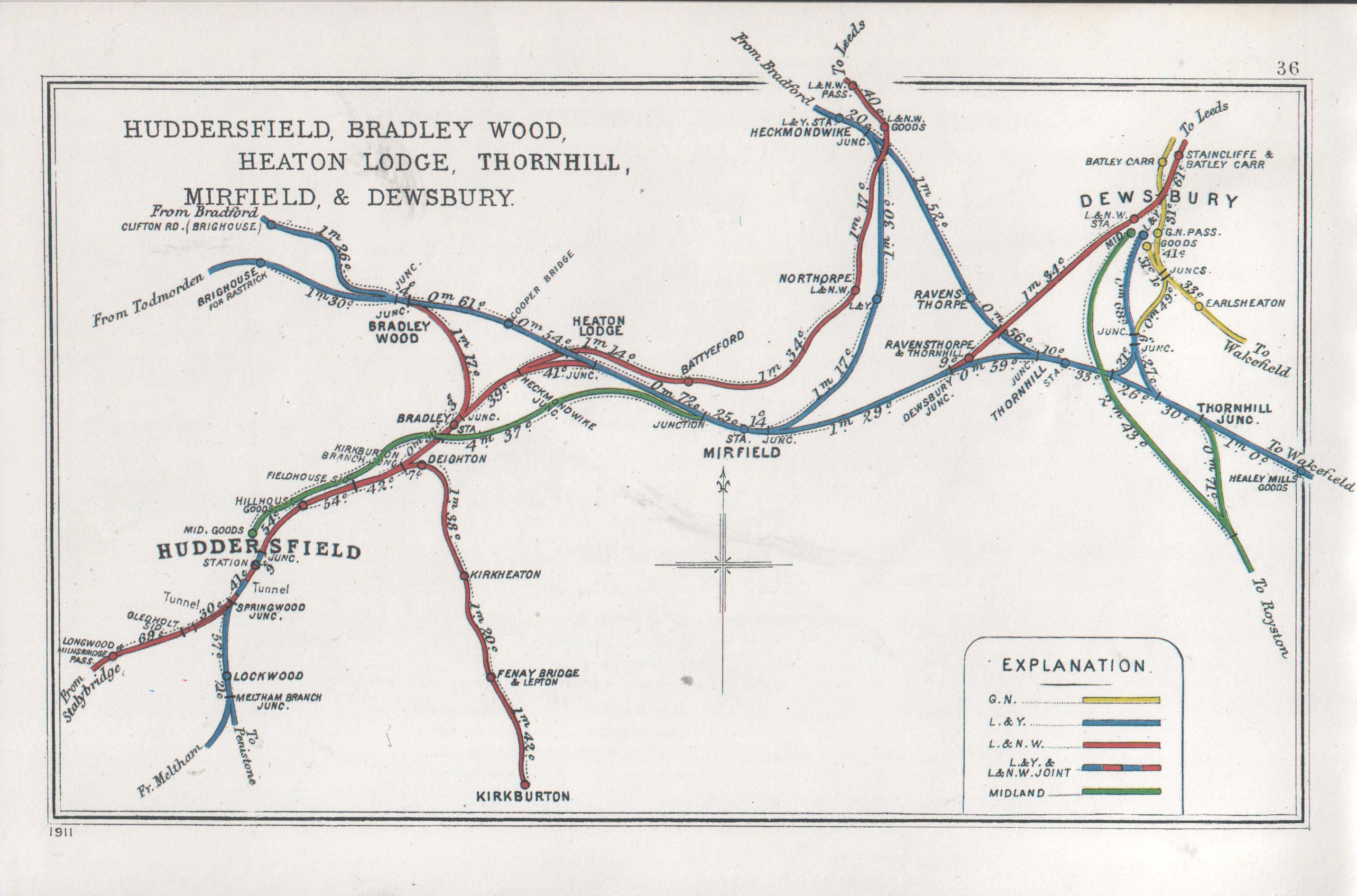
Railway lines through Huddersfield in 1911

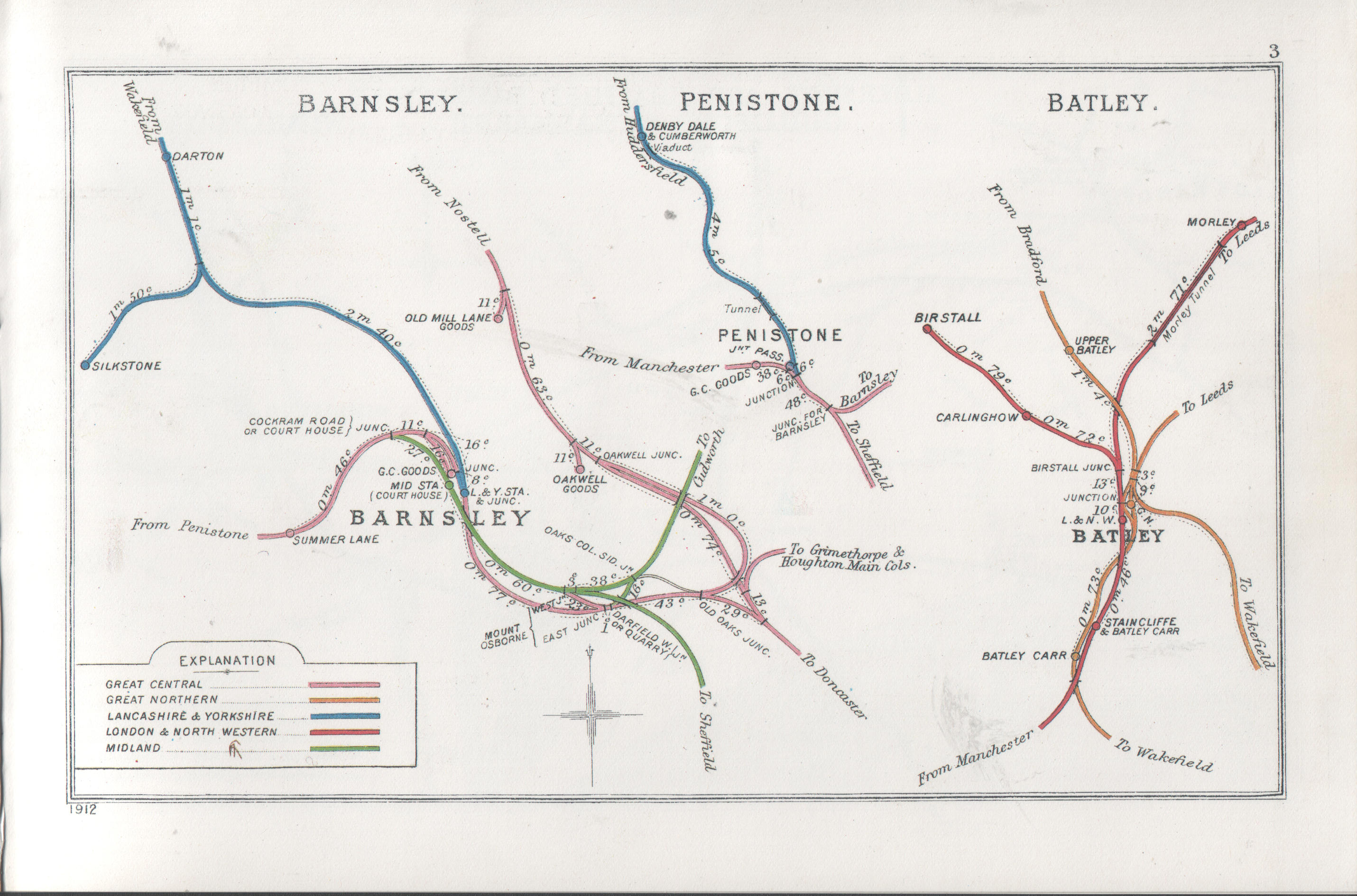
Railway lines through Penistone and Barnsley in 1912

=== Huddersfield–Penistone ===
The first section of line between Huddersfield and Penistone was opened on 1 July 1850 by the Lancashire and Yorkshire Railway (L&YR). From the joint L&YR/London and North Western Railway Huddersfield station, trains ran south to Springwood Junction (south of Huddersfield) on the London and North Western Railway Leeds–Manchester main line, where the L&YR line began; from there the route was as follows:

- Springwood Tunnel
- Lockwood
- Meltham Branch Junction was the junction for the now disused Meltham branch line
- Lockwood Viaduct
- Berry Brow
- Robin Hood Tunnel
- Honley Tunnel
- Honley
- Brockholes was the junction for the now closed Holmfirth Branch Line.
- Thurstonland Tunnel
- Stocksmoor
- Shepley also serves Shelley
- Clayton West Junction for the now closed Clayton West branch line Clayton West Junction signal box
- Cumberworth Tunnel
- Denby Dale also serves Upper Cumberworth and Lower Cumberworth, and was originally Denby Dale & Cumberworth
- Denby Dale Viaduct
- Wellhouse Tunnel
- Penistone Viaduct
- Penistone The station was opened with the line; in 1874, a joint L&YR/Manchester, Sheffield and Lincolnshire Railway (GCR from 1899) station was built to replace the original M.S.& L.R. Penistone station which served only the line to Manchester. This line was closed to passenger traffic on 5 January 1970 and completely 11 years later.

The southern part of that section follows the upper reaches of the River Don.

=== Penistone–Barnsley–Sheffield ===
At Penistone, the route joins the former Great Central Railway (GCR) line from Manchester via the Woodhead Tunnel, travelling eastwards. It deviates from the former main line towards Sheffield Victoria at a point once known as Barnsley Junction; it then heads towards that town beyond which it takes a circuitous route via Wombwell before going south to Sheffield. The route is as follows:

- Penistone: the junction here was known originally as Huddersfield Junction.
- junction, originally Barnsley Junction, with the direct line to that town and West Silkstone Junction, a few miles further, via Worsborough, to Wombwell and the now-closed Wath marshalling yard (freight-only)
- Silkstone Common (was Silkstone: the station was re-opened when the direct line to Sheffield closed and trains diverted via Barnsley on 16 May 1983)
- Dodworth (as for Silkstone – a re-opened station)
- Summer Lane (closed)
- the line then descends steeply, latterly at 1 in 50 to the former location of the junction which brought the M.S.& L. R. trains from Barnsley Court House to the Penistone line.
- the line joins the Lancashire & Yorkshire Railway's line from Wakefield and enters the former Barnsley Exchange, rebuilt and renamed Barnsley Interchange.
- Barnsley Interchange. Barnsley was served by three railway companies: L&Y, GCR, and Midland; and by two stations: Exchange and Court House. The latter is now closed. The Penistone Line continues to Sheffield, leaving the station over Jumble Lane crossing on tracks of the former South Yorkshire Railway (later Great Central) but only for a short distance. A connection made in April 1960 by British Rail gave access to the Midland route towards Sheffield (and also enabled the closure of Court House station):
- junction for the Birdwell and Pilley freight-only branch
- passes over Swaithe Viaduct high over the Worsborough line
- Wombwell (was Wombwell West)
- Elsecar (was Elsecar & Hoyland)
- Wentworth & Hoyland Common (closed)
- Tankersley Tunnel
- Chapeltown (was Chapeltown South).(not all trains stop here – check WY Metro) This station being the first to be rebuilt under the guidance of the South Yorkshire Passenger Transport Executive was moved some 500 yards further south and new approaches made from the town centre and via the ASDA car park.
- Meadowhall Interchange (the previous station on the site was named Wincobank and Meadowhall)
- Brightside, closed in the 1990s
- Attercliffe Road, closed in the 1990s.
- Sheffield Midland

Up until 1983, trains between Huddersfield and Sheffield travelled due south from Penistone direct to Sheffield via the old GCR line. The diversion to Barnsley officially opened in May 1983 and the line was marketed originally with the brand name of The Hurrier.

=== Network Rail ===
The 32.6-km section of line from Springwood Junction (between Huddersfield and Lockwood) to Barnsley Station Junction (between Dodworth and Barnsley) constitutes Network Rail route LNE 15A.

LNE 15A
Location	M-Ch	km
Barnsley	−0-11	−0.20
Barnsley Station Junction	0-00	0.00
Dodworth	2-64	4.50
Silkstone Common	4-22	6.90
Penistone	7-25	11.75
Denby Dale	11-30	18.30
Clayton West Junction	12-73	20.80
Shepley	13-47	21.85
Stocksmoor	14-35	23.25
Brockholes	16-36	26.45
Berry Brow	18-35	29.65
Lockwood	19-43	31.45
Springwood Junction	20-21	32.60
Huddersfield	+ 0-40	+ 0.80

== The Penistone Line today ==
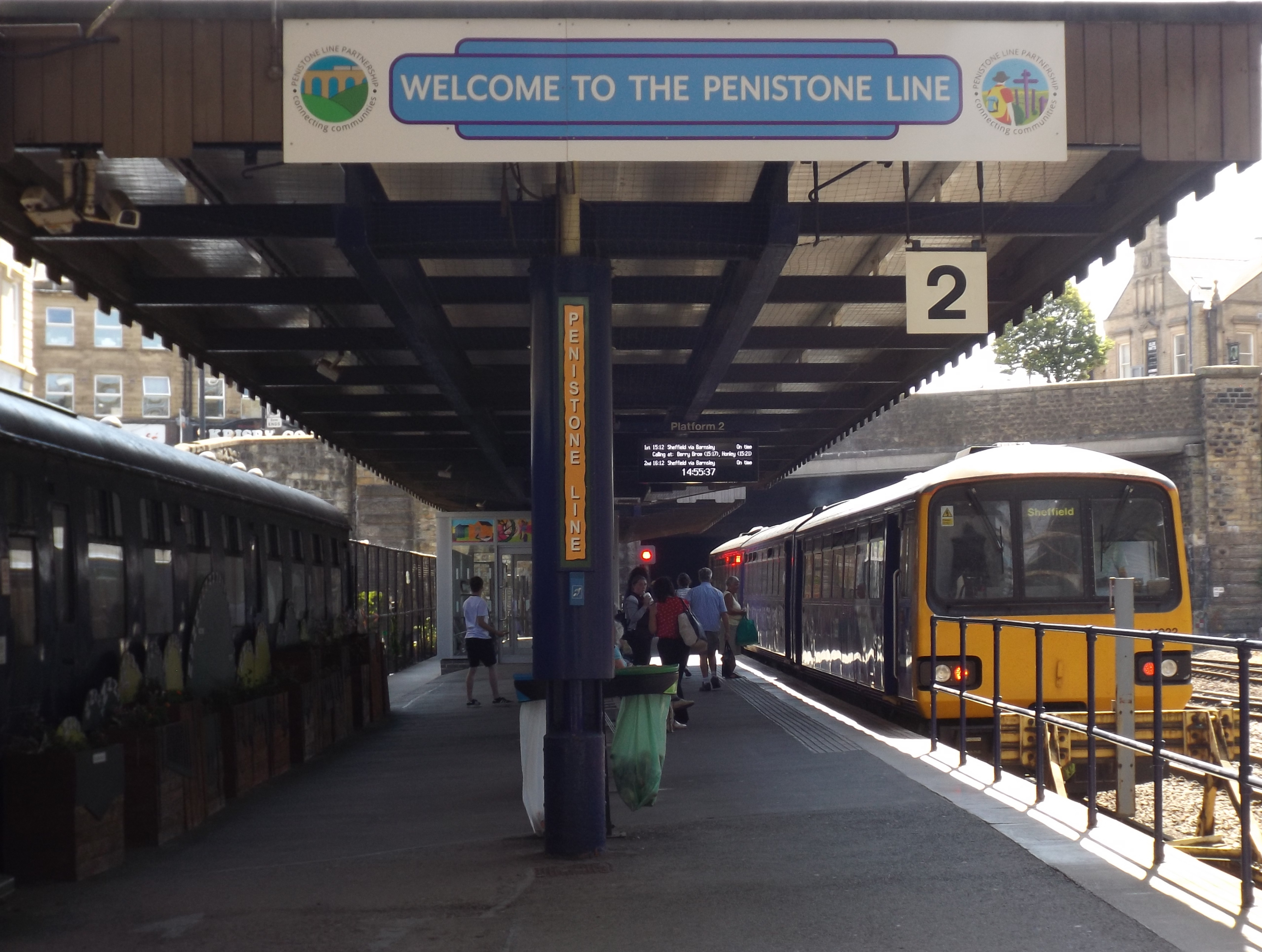
Former Platform 2 at Huddersfield, used only by Sheffield trains

Passenger numbers have continued to grow to a record 1,030,000 in 2005 – a stark contrast from the late 1970s and early 1980s, when the line was under threat of closure due to falling levels of patronage and the possible loss of revenue support from both PTEs.

The entire Barnsley to Huddersfield route was originally double tracked. However, following modernisation works in 1983 and 1989, it was reduced to a single line, apart from a pair of crossing loops at Penistone and between Stocksmoor and Shepley. Control was split between the Huddersfield and Barnsley signal boxes but, by 2018, the Rail Operating Centre at York was to take over the signalling of the entire route.

=== Tram-train trial ===
On 18 March 2008, the Department for Transport released details of a proposal to trial tram-trains on the Penistone Line, the first use of such vehicles in the UK. The trial was to start in 2010 and last for two years. Northern Rail, the operator of passenger services on the line, asked potential manufacturers to tender for the design and construction of five new vehicles, which Northern Rail would subsequently lease. In addition, Network Rail planned to spend £15 million modifying track and stations to make them compatible with the new vehicles.

However, it was announced on 15 September 2009 that a city tram-train trial between Rotherham and Sheffield would replace the Penistone Line scheme.

== Penistone Line Partnership ==
Penistone Line Partnership (PLP) is a not-for-profit community rail partnership on the line. It promotes and increased use of the train by engaging with local communities.
