= Denby Dale Viaduct =

Railway viaduct in Yorkshire, England

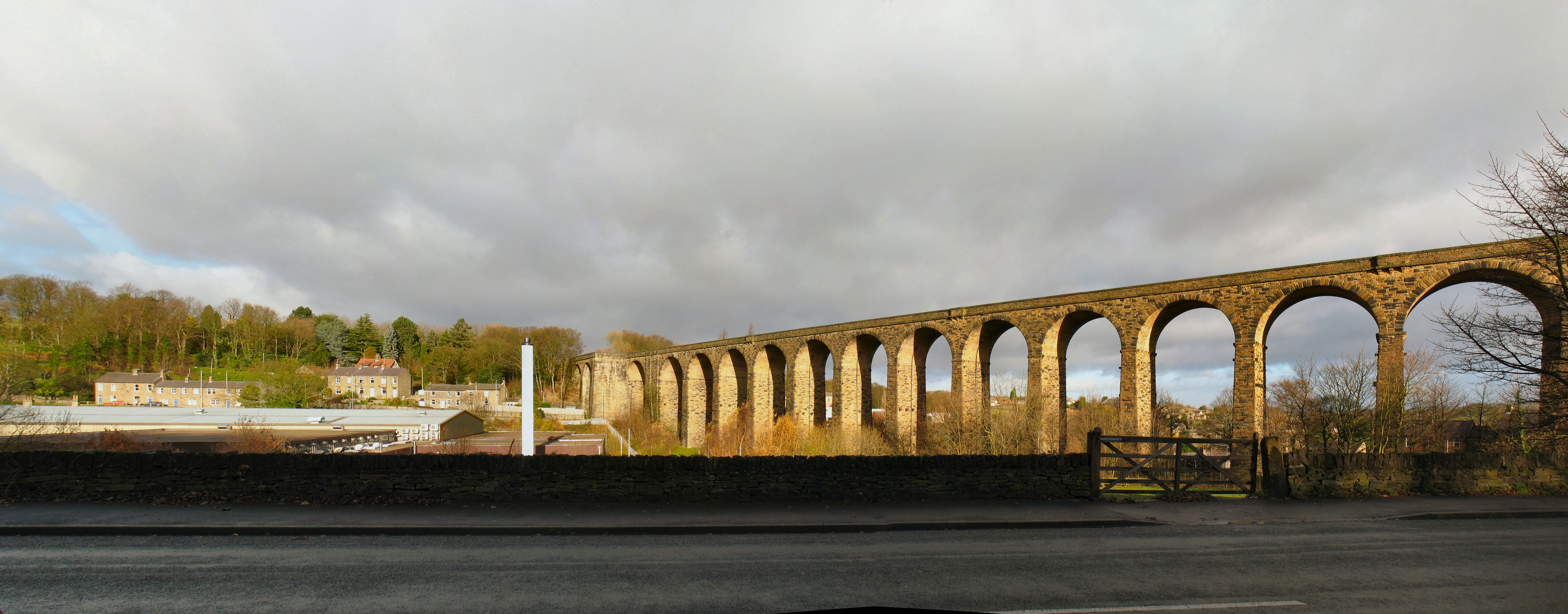
- Denby Dale viaduct in 2008
- Coordinates: 53.570°N 1.661°W
- OS grid reference: SE225081
- Carries: Penistone line
- Crosses: Dearne Valley
- Locale: Denby Dale, West Yorkshire, England
- Owner: Network Rail

Characteristics
- Total length: 15 chains (990 ft; 300 m) (Note: Chains is the measurement used by the railway engineers in the 19th century, and still in use today on Network Rail.)
- Height: 112 feet (34 m)

Rail characteristics
- No. of tracks: 1 (built for 2)
- Track gauge: 4 ft 8 1/2 in (1,435 mm) standard gauge

History
- Architect: John Hawkshaw
- Construction start: 20 September 1877
- Construction end: 20 September 1879
- Opened: 1880
- Replaces: Denby Dale Viaduct (wooden)

Statistics

Listed Building – Grade II
- Designated: 15 August 1985
- Reference no.: 1313339

Location
- Interactive map of Denby Dale Viaduct

Denby Dale Viaduct is a grade II listed railway viaduct in Denby Dale, West Yorkshire, England. The curving viaduct carries the Penistone line over the Dearne valley in Denby Dale. The viaduct is constructed of stone, but the first viaduct to carry the line in that location was made of wood, being replaced by the current structure in 1880. The abutments of the former viaduct are easily discernible against the western side of the present viaduct.

== History ==
The Huddersfield and Sheffield Junction Railway, connecting Huddersfield with Penistone, was opened to traffic in 1850. Originally, all viaducts on the line were supposed to be constructed of stone, and whilst some were, such as Lockwood Viaduct further north, others such as Denby Dale were hastily designed and constructed from wood due to a stone-masons strike, which had inflated the price of building a viaduct in this material due to the shortage of skilled labour. The timber viaduct was 1,070-foot (330 m) long, consisting of fifty-five spans each around 16-foot (4.9 m) in length. The greatest height from the rails to ground was 108 feet (33 m), with the viaduct reaching an average height of 76 feet (23 m). However, this first viaduct collapsed during a gale in January 1847, with a local newspaper reporting that "27 out of the 50 perpendicular supports were blown down [and] such was the distance that they had to fall, the strongest timbers were broken into splinters and matchwood." A replacement timber viaduct was erected on the site between 1848 and 1849, with the railway opening to traffic in 1850.

Robert Stephenson inspected the wooden bridges and viaducts on the line in 1851, and declared them safe (stating that had had an "entire conviction of their perfect safety.."), however, Denby Dale Viaduct was reported as being unsafe by 1869, and a replacement viaduct was not constructed until 13 years later. Improvements and repairs were undertaken after the 1869 report, and in 1874, an appointed inspector tested the viaduct by running four engines coupled together (each weighing 40 tonnes (44 tons)) across it, and checking for vibrations. (Note: The four engines were from the London and North Western Railway. The first test involved driving the engines all together, and then placing them funnel to funnel on the two lines and sending them across in pairs at the same time. Repairs had costed £1,000, (equivalent to £117,000 in 2023).) The inspector's report detailed that

In a work of this description, there ought never to be any question of actual failure under passing trains, but there should be an ample margin of strength as between the loads which it is required to sustain, and its ultimate strength, and no portions of it ought to be allowed to remain in the advanced condition of decay which was observable in certain timbers. I am far from wishing to create any unnecessary alarm, but I should not be doing my duty if I did not state, as a result of my examination, that in the present condition of the viaduct, a reasonable and sufficient margin of safety has not in my opinion been preserved.

The timber viaduct was taken down in 1884, four years after the stone replacement viaduct opened. The architect and engineer for both viaducts was John Hawkshaw, who by the time of the 1880 viaduct, was acting as a consulting engineer. The decision to switch from stone to timber in the 1840s was a last minute one, which, according to Hawkshaw's obituary paid off well, as it prevented a delay in the line's completion. The revenue earned from the outset, and the lack of compensatory tariffs paid out for a delayed line, meant that the new stone viaduct could be paid for from these receipts. However, some criticism was levelled at the company (the L&YR) in that the new viaduct was built over an old coal mine, and a letter from the town clerk of Denby Dale stated that some of the old workings had been filled up, but not all. The stone abutments of the original trestle viaduct can be seen from the present viaduct, just west of each end.

Construction on the present day Denby Dale Viaduct started on 20 September 1877, with the contractors using over 100,000 tonnes (110,000 tons) of stone. It was opened to traffic in 1880, and is 112 feet (34 m) high above the valley, 15 chains (990 ft; 300 m) long with 21 arches, each with a 40-foot (12 m) span. There are sixteen piers and six abutments, and each pier of the viaduct is 11 feet (3.4 m) wide at the bottom, tapering to 6 feet 6 inches (1.98 m) at the top. The contractors for building the viaduct were a local firm, Naylors, who tendered a cost of £27,650, (equivalent to £3,288,000 in 2023) and estimated a time of two and half years. The viaduct was finished early, but at a significant loss to the contractors. The viaduct is 150 yards (140 m) south of Denby Dale railway station, and is a grade II listed structure.

== See also ==
- Listed buildings in Denby Dale
- Lockwood Viaduct, another viaduct on the same line
- Penistone Viaduct, another viaduct on the same line
