= Lockwood railway station =

Railway station in West Yorkshire, England

Lockwood
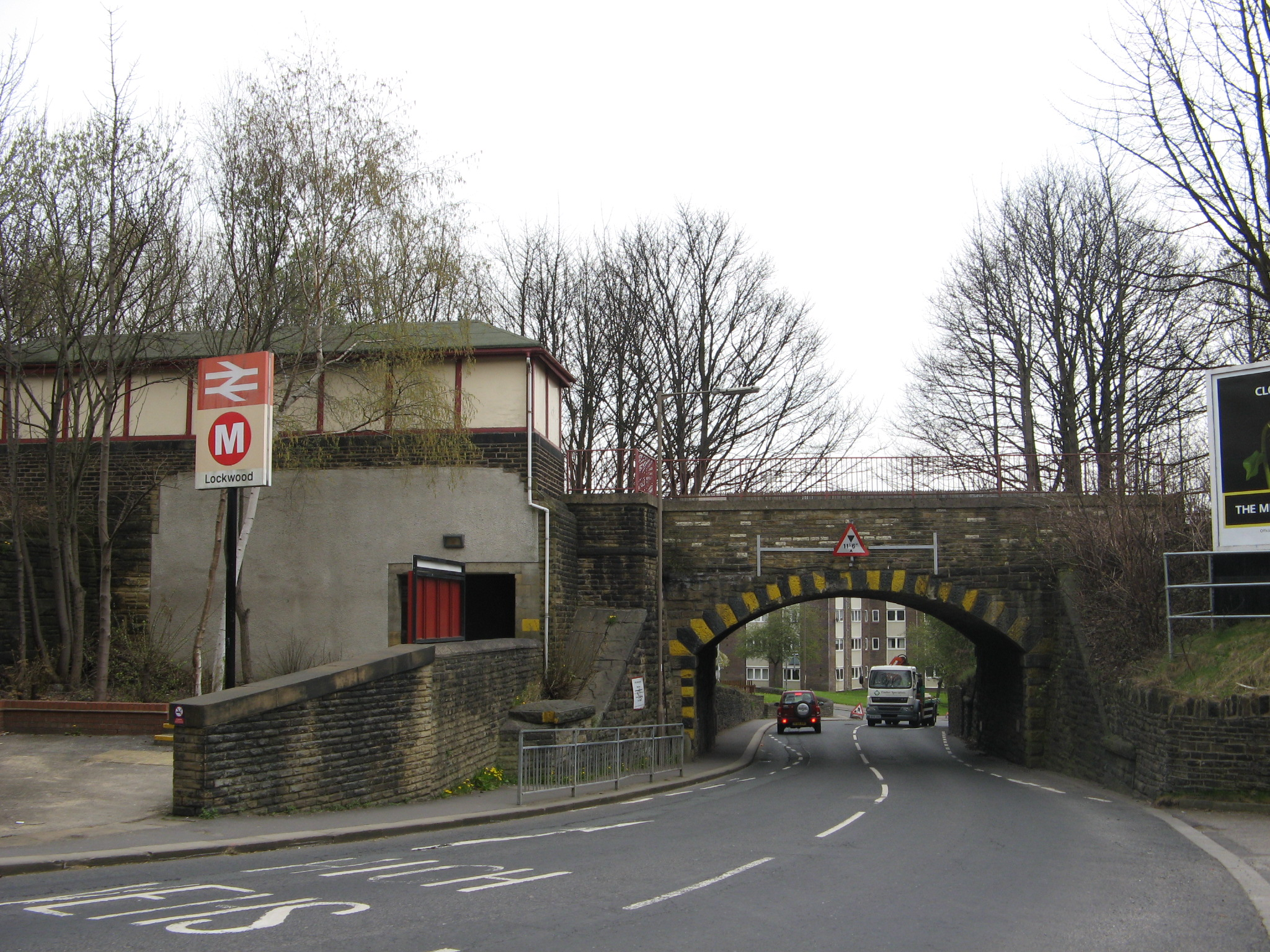
- Station entrance from Swan Lane in 2010

General information
- Location: Lockwood, Kirklees; England
- Coordinates: 53.634790°N 1.800800°W
- Grid reference: SE132153
- Manager: Northern Trains
- Transit authority: West Yorkshire (Metro)
- Platforms: 1

Other information
- Station code: LCK
- Fare zone: 5
- Classification: DfT category F2

History
- Opened: 1 July 1850; 176 years ago

Passengers
- 2021/22: ▲32,398
- 2022/23: ▲36,012
- 2023/24: ▲40,588
- 2024/25: ▲47,656
- 2025/26: ▼46,380
Location
Notes
- Passenger statistics from the Office of Rail and Road

Lockwood railway station is a railway station in Huddersfield, England. It is situated 1.5 miles (2 km) south of Huddersfield station on the Penistone Line between Huddersfield and Sheffield. It serves the Lockwood district of Huddersfield, and services are provided by Northern.

The station comprises a single side platform alongside the single-line of the railway, although the remains of a second platform alongside the site of the former second track (removed in 1989) are still visible.

To the south of the station, the line to Sheffield passes over the valley of the River Holme by an impressive 476 yards (435 m) long stone viaduct to Berry Brow. Below the 122 feet (37 m) high structure is the Huddersfield Rugby Union Club ground at Lockwood Park, which was formerly a Bass Brewery. The former Meltham branch line branched off the main line just before the viaduct. This line closed to passengers in 1949 and to freight in 1965. To the north, the route passes through a short tunnel then crosses another large viaduct across the River Colne before joining the main line at Springwood Junction.

== Facilities ==
The station is unstaffed and has a basic shelter on its single active platform; all tickets must be bought on the train or in advance, as there is no ticket machine. A help point and digital information screen are provided to offer train running information. Step-free access is via a ramp from the station car park.

== Services ==
All services to the station are operated by Northern Trains. There is an hourly service in both directions on Monday to Saturdays and on Sundays also (though starting later in the morning).

Preceding station	National Rail	Following station
Berry Brow	Northern Trains Penistone Line	Huddersfield
	Disused railways	
Netherton; Line and station closed	Lancashire and Yorkshire Railway; Meltham branch line	Huddersfield; Line and station open

== Accidents and incidents ==
- On 28 October 1913, a freight train became divided. The rear portion ran away and was derailed at the station.
- In 1952, a rake of wagons ran away and was derailed by trap points at the station.
- On 28 June 1958, a rake of four carriages ran away and were derailed by trap points at the station, crashing into the booking office.

== Gallery ==
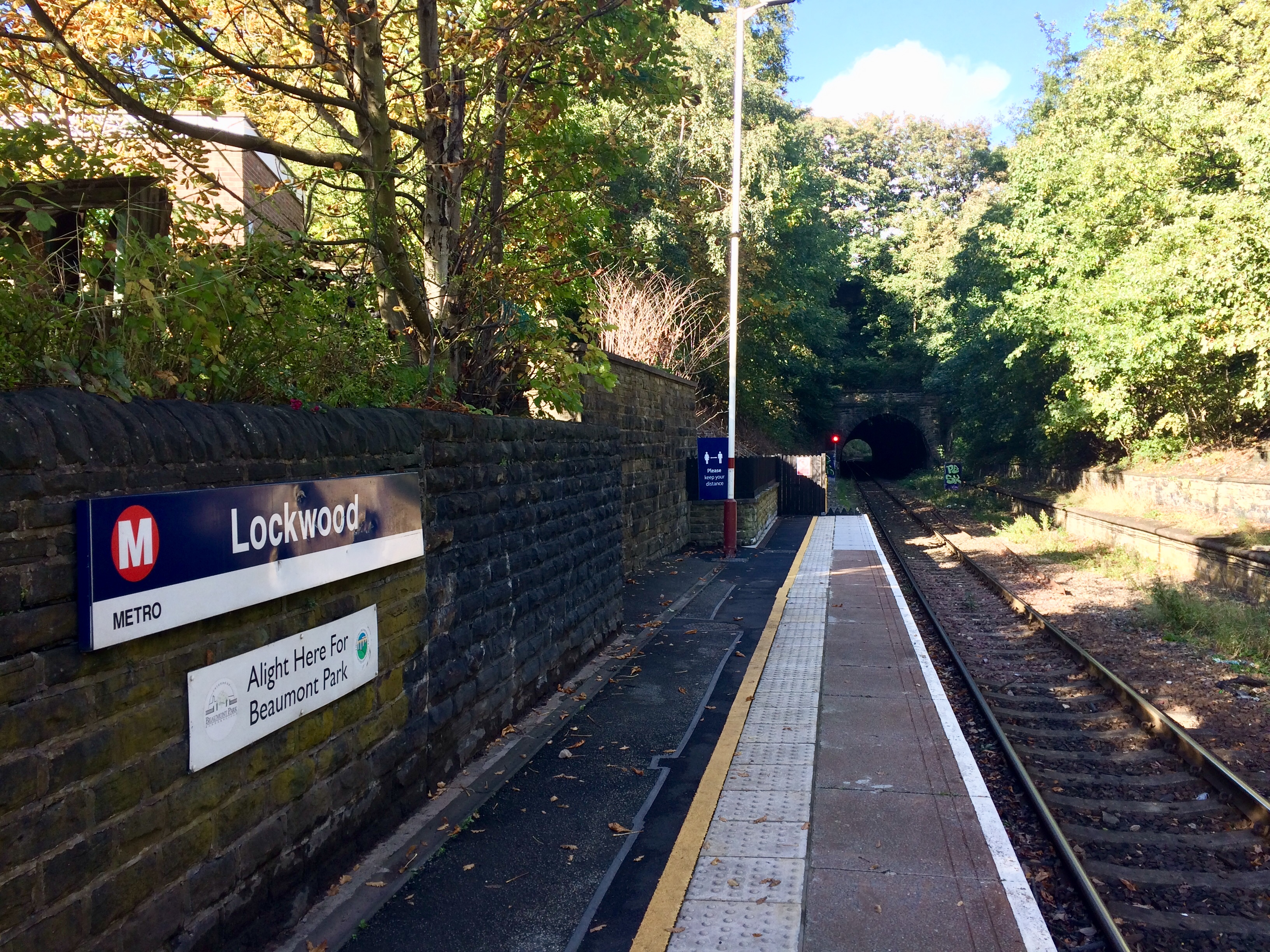
View looking north from platform

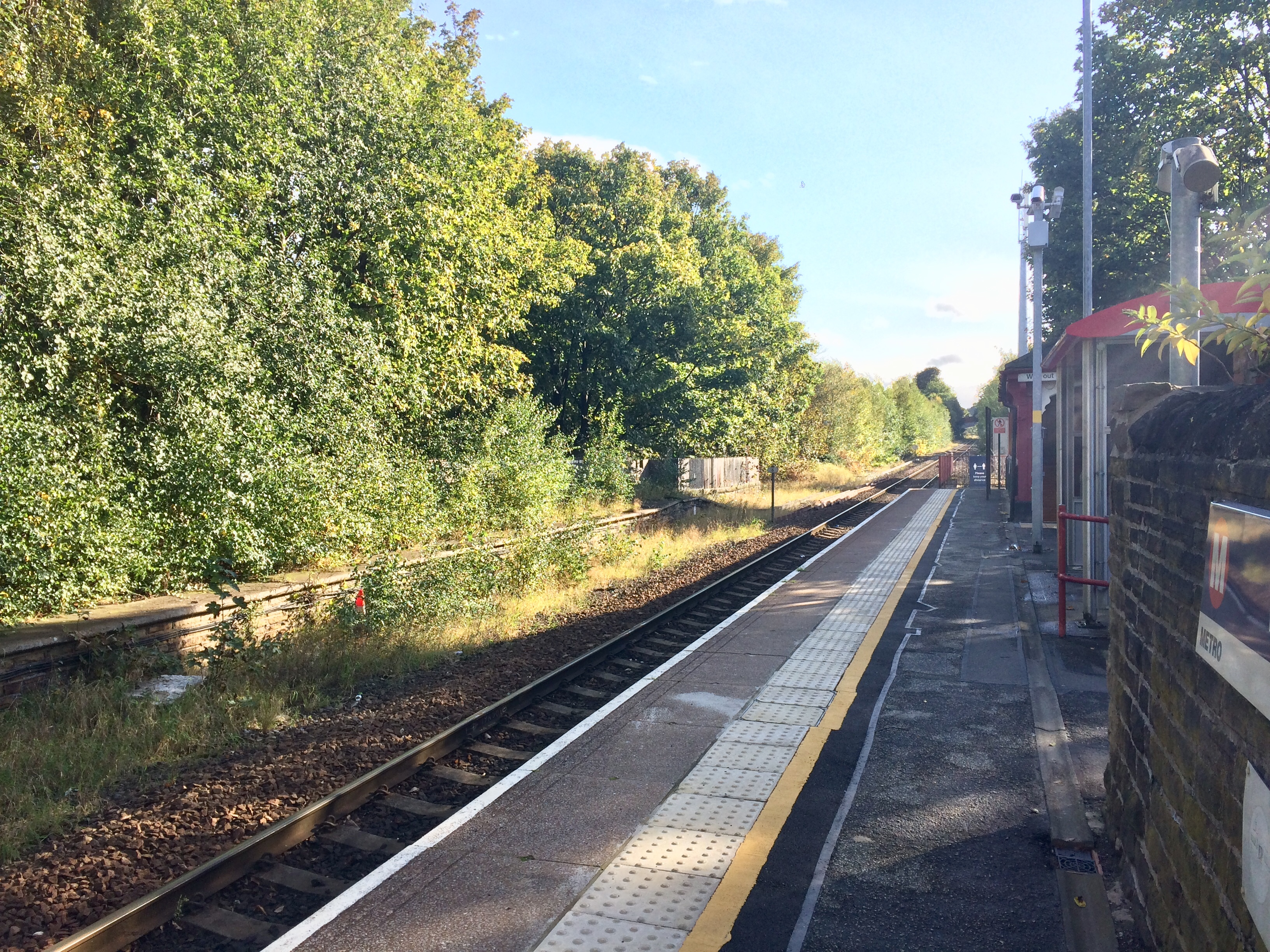
View looking south from platform

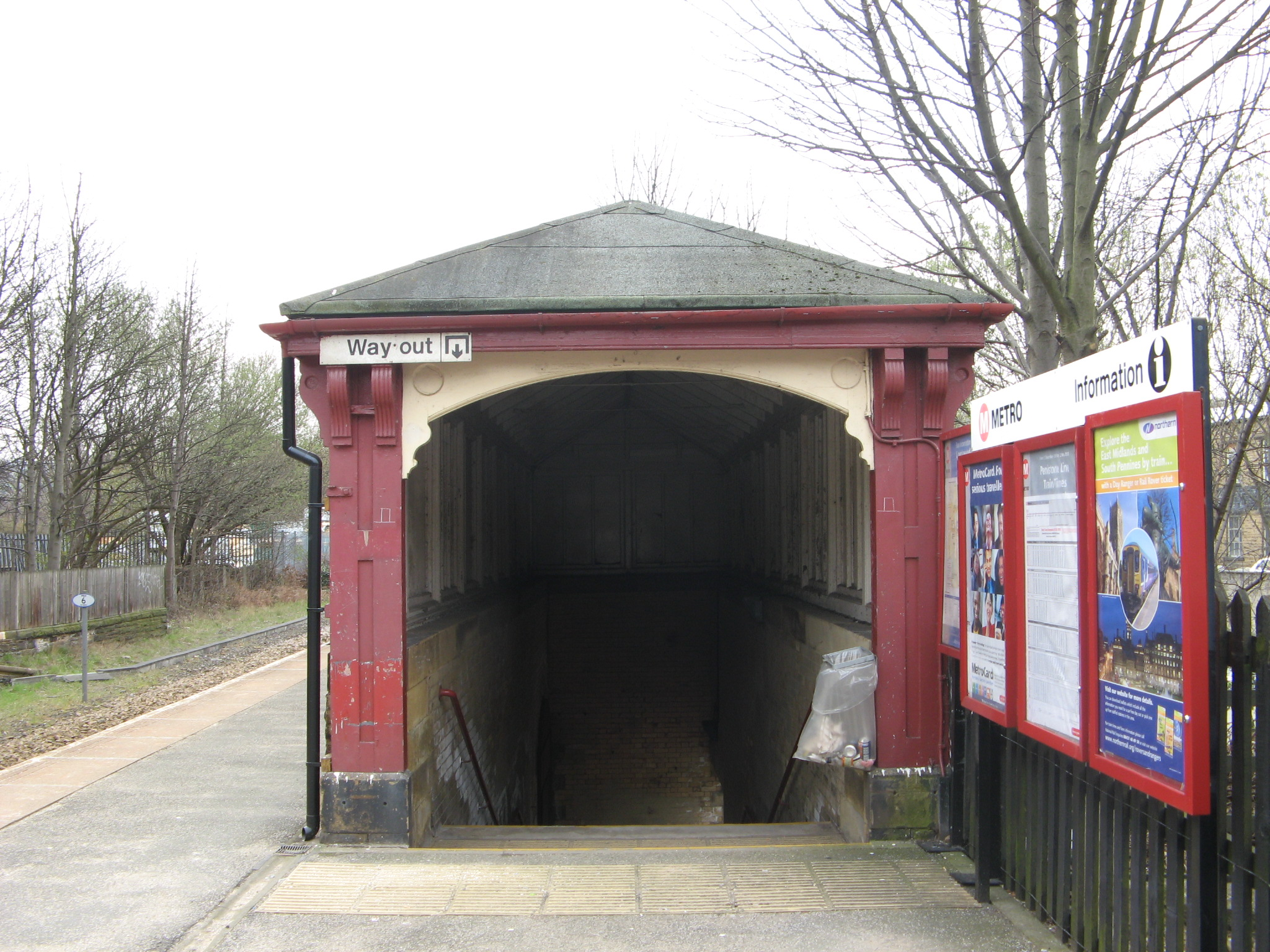
The station exit

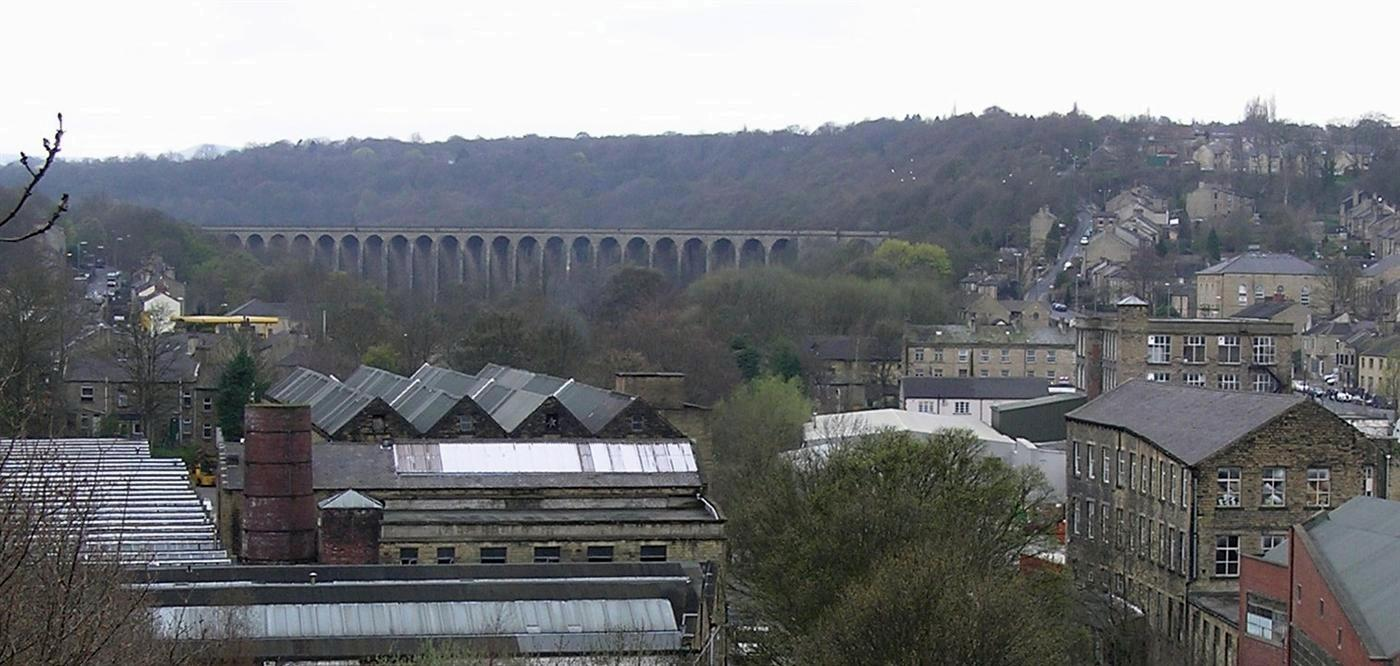
Viaduct over the Holme valley
