= Penistone Viaduct =

Railway viaduct in Yorkshire

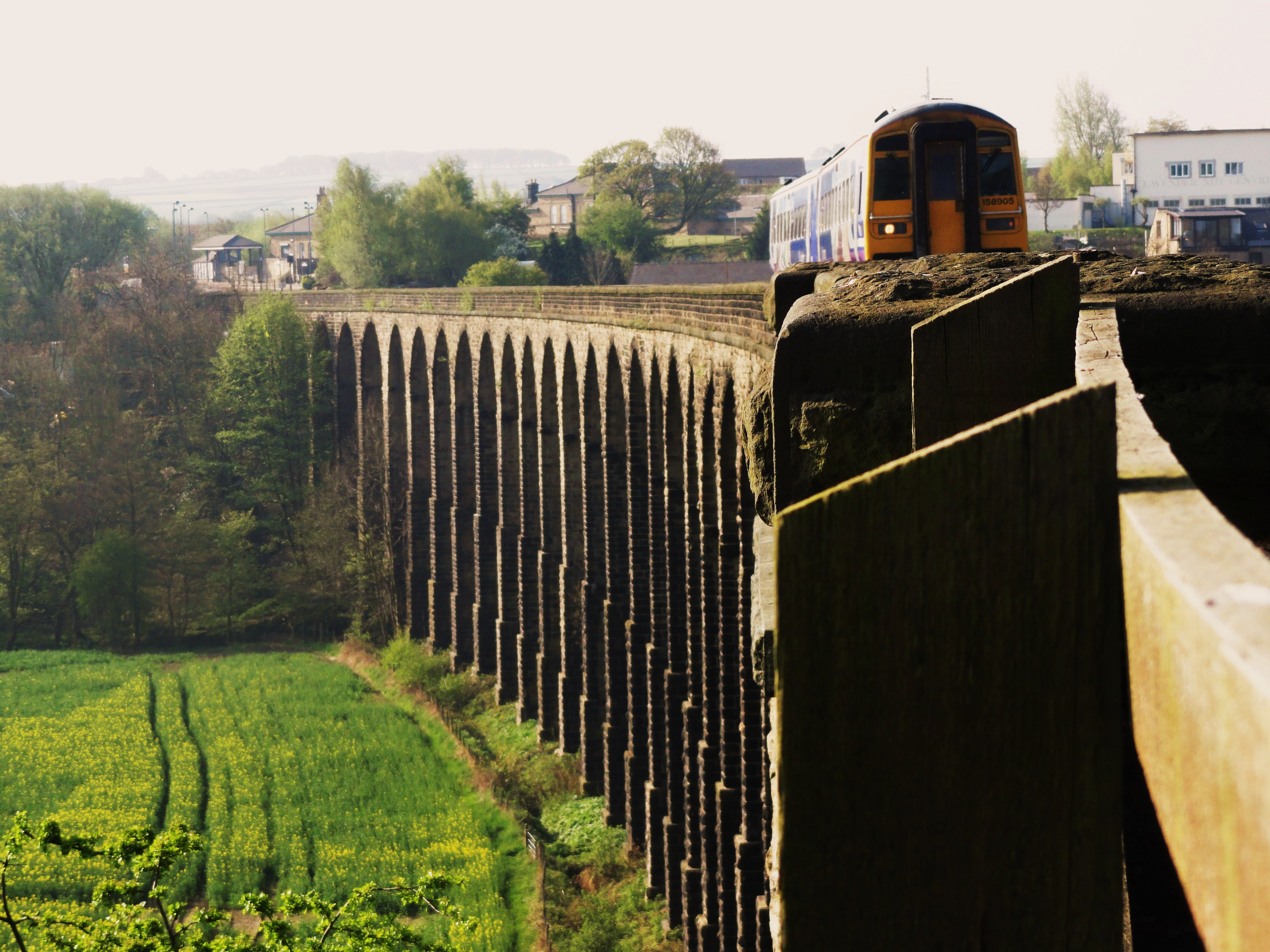
- Huddersfield–bound (northwards) DMU traversing the viaduct
- Coordinates: 53.528°N 1.623°W
- OS grid reference: SE250035
- Carried: Penistone Line
- Crossed: River Don
- Locale: Penistone, South Yorkshire, England

Characteristics
- Total length: 16 chains (1,100 ft; 320 m) (Note: Chains were the standard use of measure used by the railway engineers in the 19th century, and still in use today on Network Rail.)
- Height: 85 feet (26 m)

Rail characteristics
- No. of tracks: 1 (built for 2)
- Track gauge: 4 ft 8 1/2 in (1,435 mm) standard gauge

History
- Opened: 1850
- Rebuilt: 1916
- Collapsed: 1916

Statistics

Listed Building – Grade II
- Designated: 27 April 1988
- Reference no.: 1286798

Location
- Interactive map of Penistone Viaduct

Penistone Viaduct is a grade II listed railway viaduct that carries the Penistone Line over the River Don in Penistone, South Yorkshire, England. It is immediately north of Penistone station and was completed in 1850 to a design by John Hawkshaw. The viaduct was partially rebuilt in 1916 after one of the arches over the River Don collapsed.

== History ==
Penistone Viaduct was completed in 1850, when the line was opened for traffic, though some sources state a newer viaduct was built in 1885. (Note: Only Pevsner and Historic England state the viaduct was rebuilt in 1885. No other sources make mention of this, with most stating the viaduct was built in 1850, despite the disparity between it having either 31, or 29 arches.) Originally planned and engineered by the Huddersfield and Sheffield Junction Railway, by the time of opening, the line was in the hands of the Lancashire and Yorkshire Railway. The viaduct is 330 yards (300 m) long and 83–85 feet (25–26 m) above the bed of the River Don. The outside of the viaduct consisted of rough ashlar blocks which were 12 inches (300 mm) thick. It also has 29 arches and curved with a radius of 40 chains (2,600 ft; 800 m), with the inside of the curve facing away from the town. Each pier is 7 feet (2.1 m) thick at the base, tapering to 4 feet 6 inches (1.37 m) at the top and is infilled with rubble. The viaduct was built from solid stone blocks, assembled using a method called 'block-in-course', which the engineer described as "requiring great care in its execution." (Note: 'Block-in-course' is a method of using squared stone masonry which has quite close joints. This is supposed to give the structure strength and durability.) Stone for the first viaduct was sourced from a quarry in Walk Mill, a part of the settlement of Oxspring, just to the east of Penistone.

In 1884, a train was halted on the viaduct on the approach to the station, and one passenger, assuming the train had stopped in the station, stepped out of the compartment and fell to his death in the valley below. Ironically, the train had stopped a little too short of the station as people falling off the viaduct was anticipated when it was built, and a short length of iron fencing was placed upon the eastern parapet on the southern end to prevent such an eventuality as someone stepping off the viaduct.

In February 1916, the viaduct collapsed whilst an engine was stationary upon it. The driver and fireman had noticed that the arch they were on was collapsing slowly, and managed to get away safely before total loss, however the steam engine fell into the void. The arches that collapsed were at the southern end where the viaduct crosses the River Don. Heavy rains had scoured the base of the stone piers, and some days before a crack had appeared in the parapet, but it could not be ascertained why, and the crack was filled in. The Huddersfield Chamber of Commerce held a meeting to complain to the Lancashire and Yorkshire Railway about the situation with the collapsed viaduct. Coal supply was affected and passengers would have to travel a circuitous route to London. The company was also asked why trains would stop ten minutes short of Penistone railway station, with no official transport to convey passengers and their luggage onwards to Penistone. The viaduct was repaired quickly, and reopened to traffic on 14 August 1916. The engine was recovered and scrapped, and the chimney was used as a plant pot at Brockholes station.

The length of the viaduct is 16 chains (1,100 ft; 320 m), and it consists of 29 arches, though sometimes it is listed as having either 30 or 31 arches. Each pier is 7 feet (2.1 m) at the bottom, and tapers to 4 feet 6 inches (1.37 m) at the top. Biddle states the viaduct to be 98 feet (30 m) high. (Note: Various sources give differing heights for the viaduct) Whilst the line was engineered for two tracks throughout and the station at Penistone has two platforms, the lines merge, just to the north of the station, with only the former southbound line in use. The viaduct itself is grade II Listed.

== See also ==
- Denby Dale Viaduct
- Lockwood Viaduct
- Listed buildings in Penistone
