= Lockwood Viaduct =

Railway viaduct in West Yorkshire, England

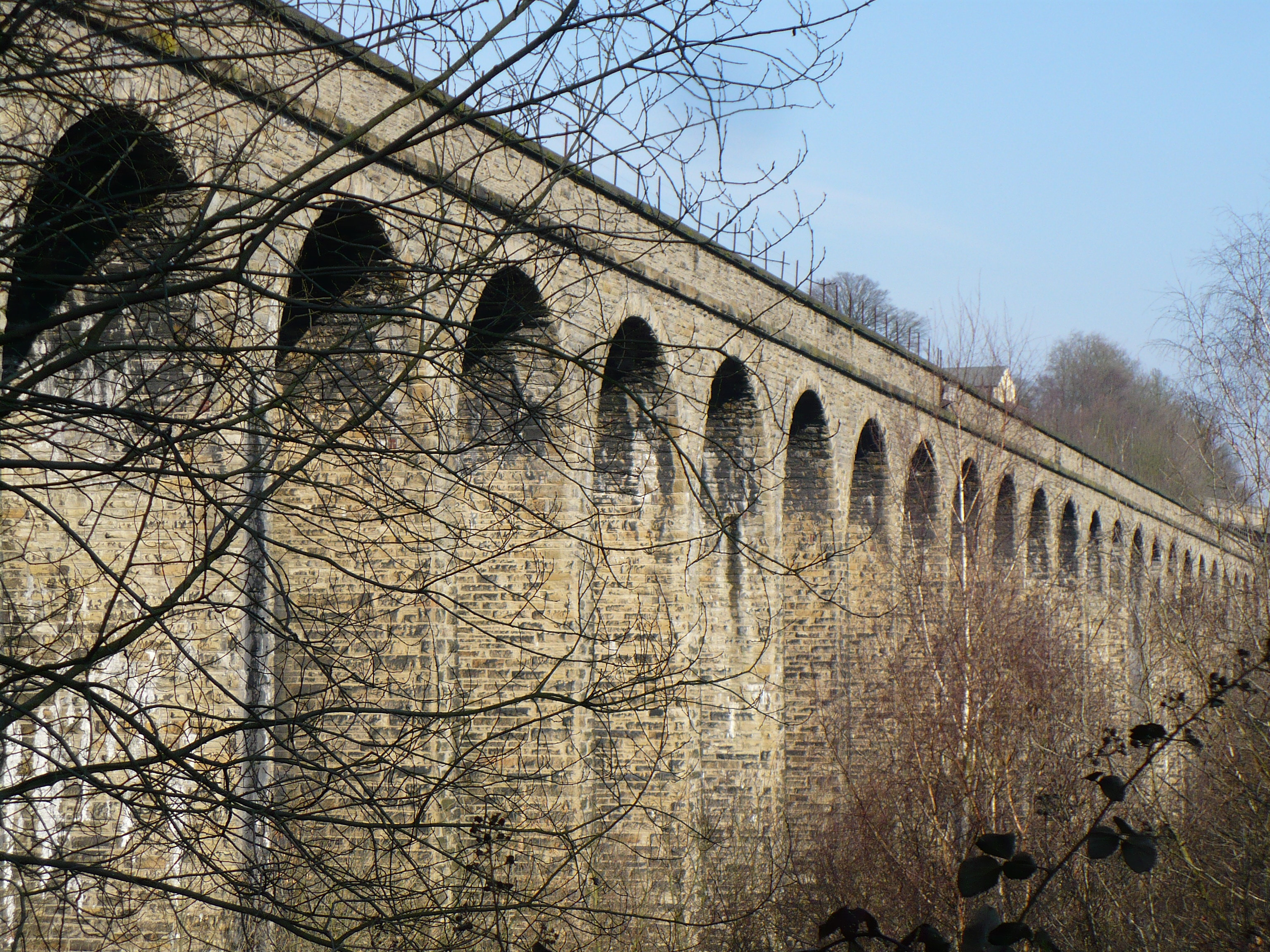
- Coordinates: 53.628°N 1.800°W
- OS grid reference: SE132146
- Carries: Penistone line
- Crosses: River Holme
- Locale: Lockwood, West Yorkshire, England
- Owner: Network Rail

Characteristics
- Total length: 17 chains (1,100 ft; 340 m) (Note: Chains is the measurement used by the railway engineers in the 19th century, and still in use today on Network Rail.)
- Height: 122 feet (37 m)

Rail characteristics
- No. of tracks: 1 (built for 2)
- Track gauge: 4 ft 8 1/2 in (1,435 mm) standard gauge

History
- Engineering design by: John Hawkshaw
- Constructed by: Miller-Blackie and Shortridge
- Construction start: 1846
- Construction end: 1848
- Construction cost: £33,000 (1849)
- Opened: 1850

Statistics

Listed Building – Grade II
- Designated: 29 September 1978
- Reference no.: 1134434

Lockwood Viaduct is a stone railway bridge that carries the Huddersfield to Penistone Line across the River Holme, in West Yorkshire, England. The viaduct is noted for its height, (being an average of 122-foot (37 m) high, but at its maximum, to the top of the parapet level, it is 136 feet (41 m)), leading one journalist to describe it as "One of the most stupendous structures of ancient or modern times." One local challenge has been to "lob" a cricket ball over the viaduct, with some claiming that they have. The viaduct was completed in 1848 and is now a grade II listed structure.

== History ==
Lockwood Viaduct is a stone built railway viaduct that straddles the River Holme, the B6108 and the A616, in the village of Lockwood, near Huddersfield in West Yorkshire. The viaduct was built between 1846 and 1848 by the Huddersfield and Sheffield Junction Railway (to a design by John Hawkshaw) carrying their railway south to Penistone and the branch to Holmfirth. The viaduct consists of 32 stone arches, the tallest of which is 121 feet (37 m) in height to the rail level, with a skew arch at either end. Each of the 32 arches is 30 feet (9.1 m) across, whereas the two larger skew arches are 42 feet (13 m) and 70 feet (21 m). The rock and spoil for the viaduct came from cuttings dug out for the railway to the south of the viaduct; Taylor Hill cutting, which is 396 yards (362 m) long and 61 feet (19 m) deep. A description by Hawkshaw himself describes the sandstone varying from 3 inches (76 mm) to 12 inches (300 mm) in thickness.

The viaduct cost £33,000 in 1849, (equivalent to £4,324,000 in 2023), £3,000 of which was spent on the timber frames for the masonry. The viaduct is shown as being 17 chains (1,100 ft; 340 m) long, straddling the River Holme, and whilst it was built for two tracks, only the northbound track is in use for both directions. The 36-arch viaduct has been described as "soaring", especially when viewed from the ground level looking up. George Searle Phillips (a Huddersfield journalist in the 19th century), described it as being "One of the most stupendous structures of ancient or modern times. The impression is almost irresistible that it is the work of demi-gods and giants." The height from river level to the top of the parapet of the viaduct is 136 feet (41 m). The entire width of the viaduct at rail level is 28-foot (8.5 m), with the internal width being 25-foot (7.6 m).

The viaduct cuts across the Lockwood Park Sport Complex.

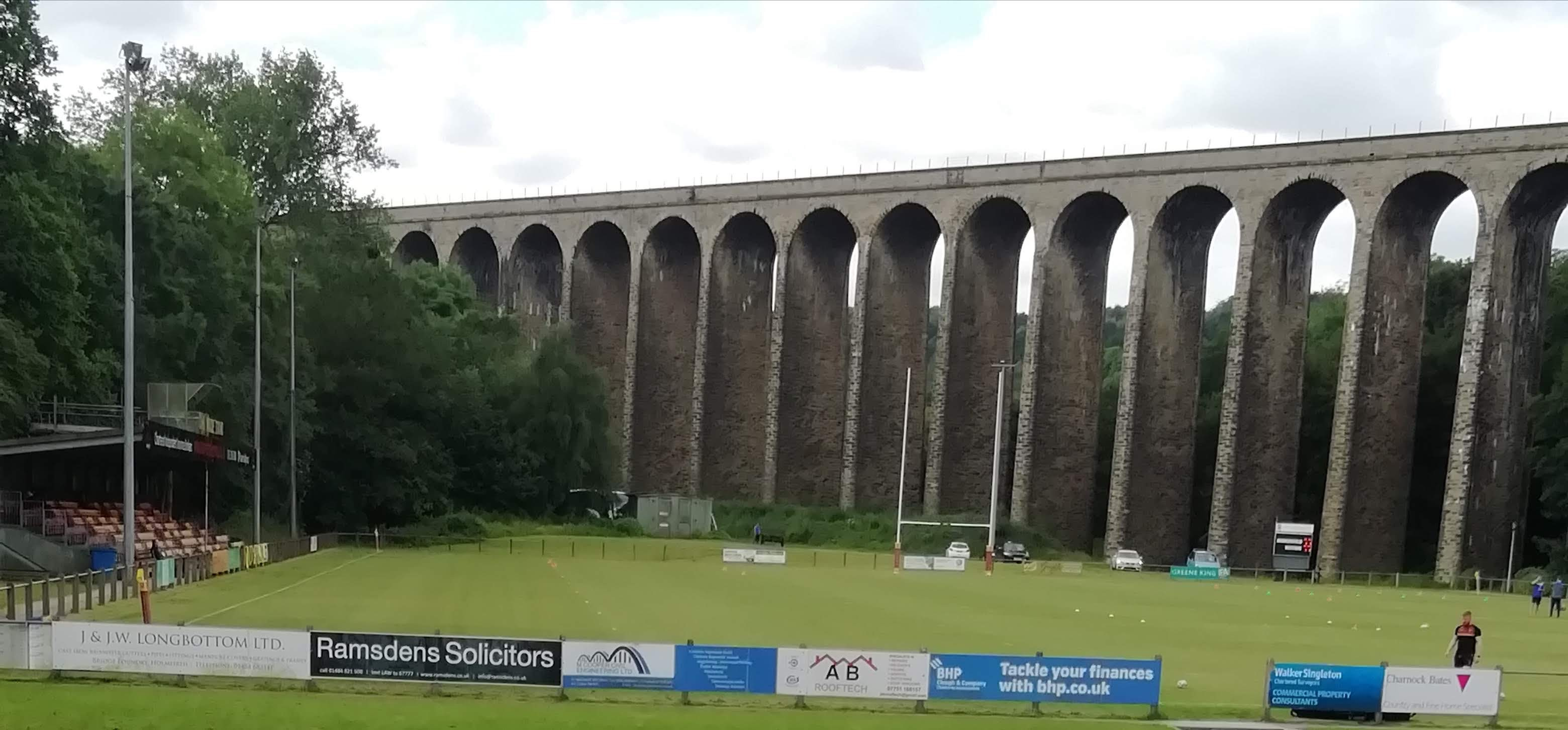
The view of the stunning lockwood viaduct from the clubhouse of Lockwood Park

== Cricket ball lobs ==
One historical challenge regarding the viaduct is that of succeeding in throwing (or lobbing), a cricket ball over the viaduct. The challenge of the viaduct's height and width (136-foot (41 m) and 28 feet (8.5 m) respectively), means that the lob must be thrown to a height of 180 feet (55 m) to succeed. Some stories relate a train arriving at Bradford Exchange with a cricket ball on the train that had come in through an open window (or smashed through). However, a railway historian cast doubt on this, and the local paper, in the interests of health and safety, dissuaded readers from trying to emulate the feat.

== See also ==
- Denby Dale Viaduct, another viaduct on the same line
- Penistone Viaduct, another viaduct on the same line
- Rail transport in Great Britain
- History of rail transport in Great Britain
