= River Holme =

River in Yorkshire, England

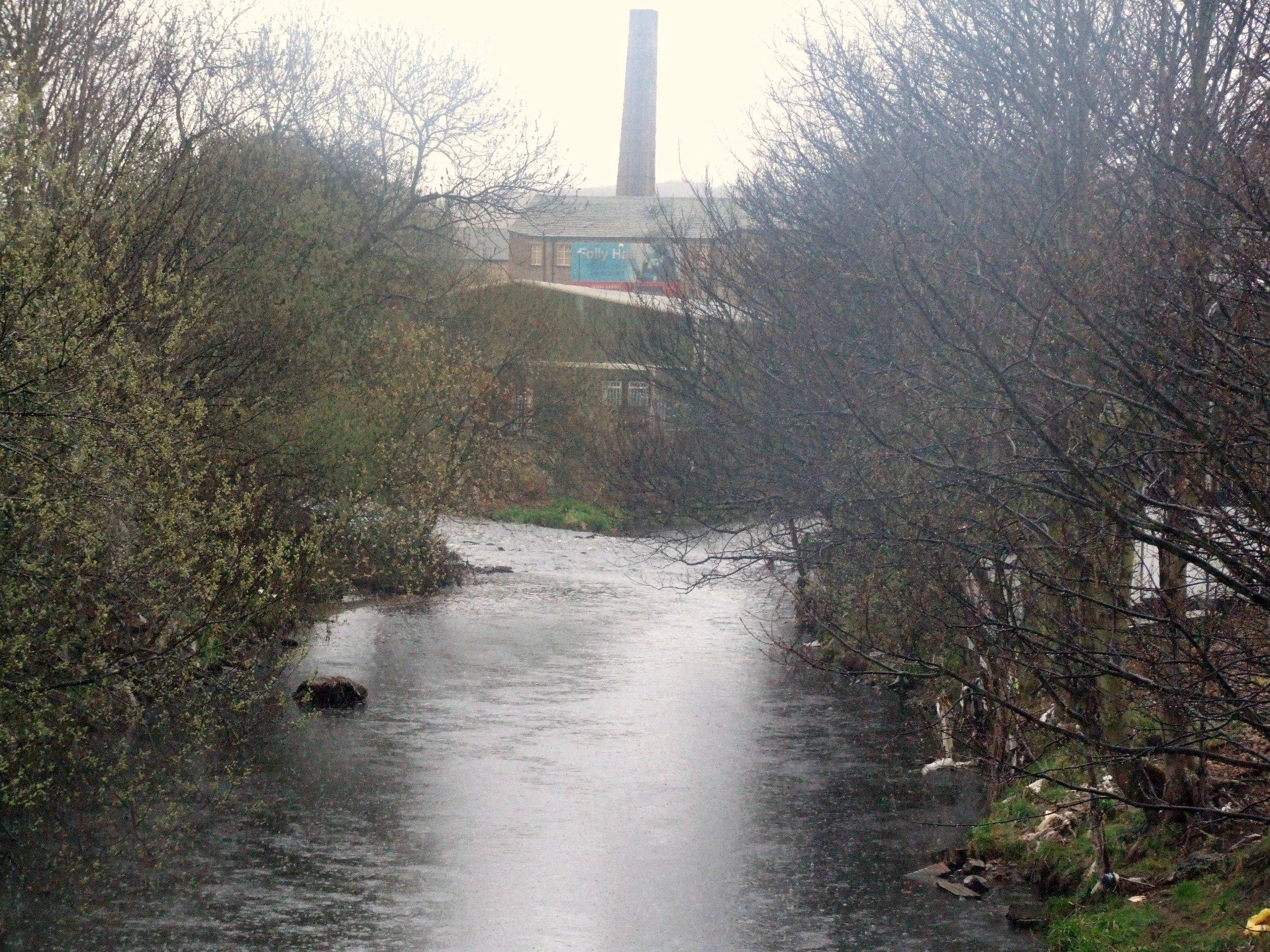
- River Holme (left) joining the River Colne at Huddersfield

Location
- Country: England

Physical characteristics
- Source
  - location: Holmbridge
  - coordinates: 53°13′15″N 1°49′27″W
  - elevation: 188 metres (617 ft)
- Mouth
  - location: River Colne at Huddersfield
  - coordinates: 53°38′21″N 1°47′4″W
  - elevation: 72 metres (236 ft)
- Length: 13.86 km (8.61 mi)
- Basin size: 97.4 km^{2} (37.6 sq mi)

Basin features
- Progression: Colne–Calder–Aire–Ouse–Humber–North Sea

The Holme of the Holme Valley, West Yorkshire, England is a tributary of the River Colne, West Yorkshire. The source is via Digley Reservoir, fed firstly by the run-off from Brownhill Reservoir, then by Dobbs Dike. Banks along the upper valley are mostly urbanised and are in the Holme Valley civil parish.

== Course ==
From Digley Reservoir, the river flows north-east through Holmbridge and Holmfirth. It flows NNE to Thongsbridge and Brockholes, then north to reach Honley, Berry Brow and Lockwood. In Honley it is crossed by the Grade II listed Honley Bridge, dated 1791. It wends northwards and joins the Colne (one of five rivers of that name) just south of Huddersfield town centre at Folly Hall.

The Environment Agency has a gauging station at Queen's Mill in Huddersfield, where the recorded average monthly levels are 0.25 metres (0.82 ft), versus 1.2 metres (3.9 ft). The record high is 2.5 metres (8.2 ft), in 2011.

=== Flooding ===
The river was prone to flooding, the earliest recorded in 1738. In 1840 the dam of Bilberry Reservoir was built over a stream, but the work had not been done properly and the stream not correctly redirected. Thus in February 1852, the reservoir broke its confines and flooded the valley as far as Holmfirth. It caused 81 deaths and the destruction of many homes and businesses.

== Geography ==
=== Natural upper catchment ===
The top of the valley is surrounded by the high hills, wooded on their lower slopes, of Holme Moss, Harden Moss and Cartworth Moor.

=== Geology ===
The underlying bedrock was laid down in the late Carboniferous period and is primarily of Millstone Grit with some sandstone interspersed with thin coal seams.

== Lists ==
=== Tributaries ===
- Dobb Dike
- Black Sike Dike
- River Ribble
- Hebble Dike/Mark Bottoms Dike
- New Mill Dike
- Mag Brook
- Dean Clough

=== Settlements ===
- Holmbridge
- Holmfirth
- Wooldale
- Netherthong
- Thongsbridge
- Brockholes
- Honley
- Netherton
- Huddersfield

=== Road crossings ===
- A6024 Woodhead Road, Holmbridge
- Dobb Lane, Holmbridge
- Hollowgate, Holmfirth
- A635, Victoria Road, Holmfirth
- Bridge Lane, Holmfirth
- Miry Lane, Thongsbridge
- Smithy Place Lane, Brockholes
- A6024, Honley
- Northgate, Honley
- Magdale, Honley
- B6110, Armitage Road, Armitage Bridge, Huddersfield
- A616, Bridge Street, Huddesfield
- Queens Mill Road, Huddersfield

== Gallery ==
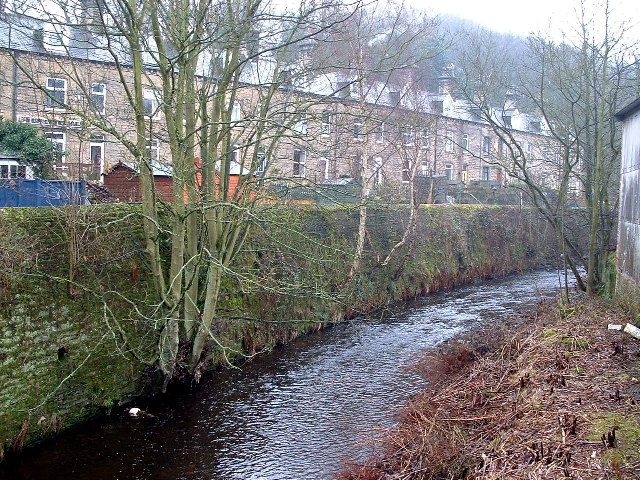
River Holme, Thongsbridge

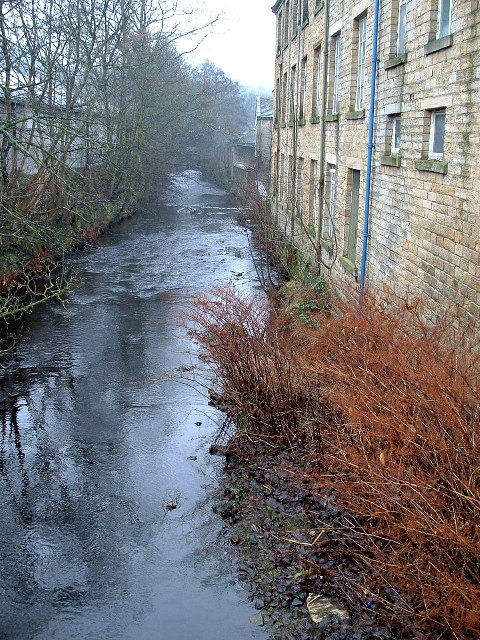
River Holme, Thongsbridge

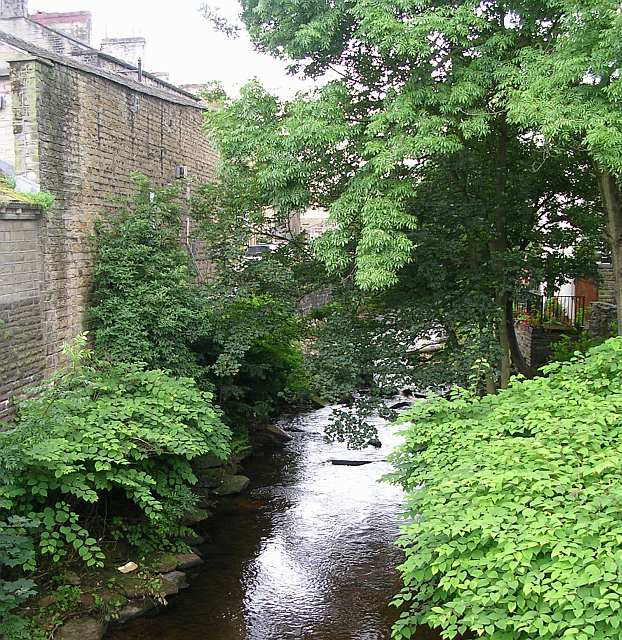
River Holme - Towngate

Honley Bridge

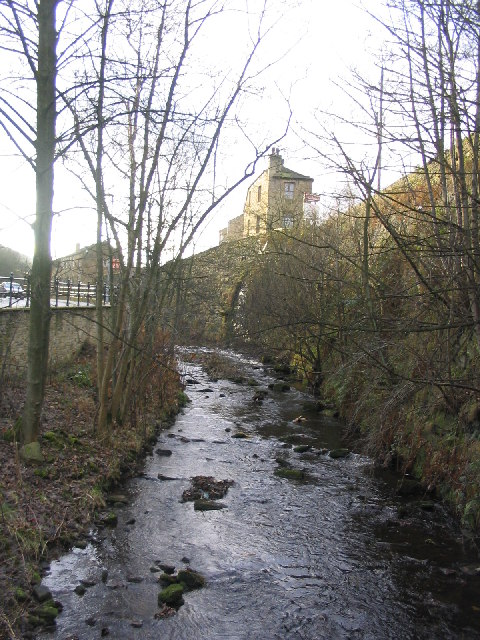
River Holme at Holmfirth

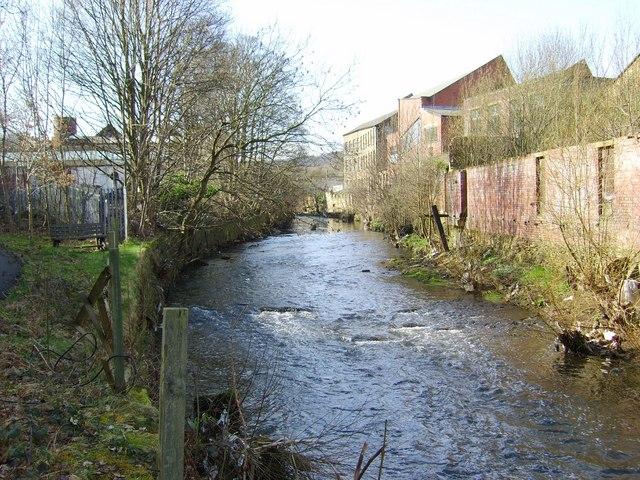
River Holme in Lockwood Huddersfield

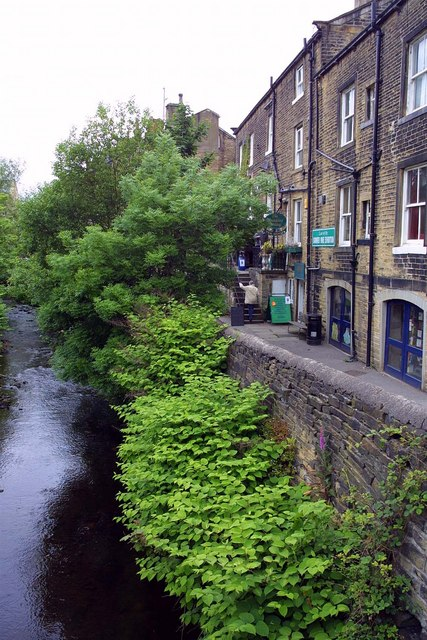
The River Holme in Holmfirth

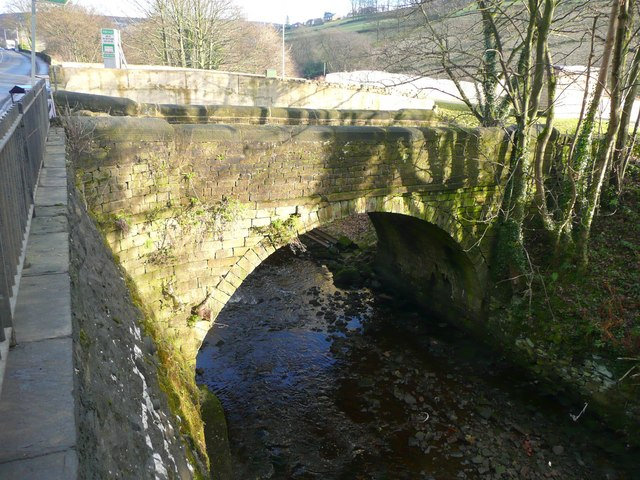
Old bridge over the River Holme, off Woodhead Road, Holmfirth

== See also ==
- Holmfirth Floods
