= Thongsbridge =

Village in West Yorkshire, England

Coordinates: 53.5844°N 1.7733°W

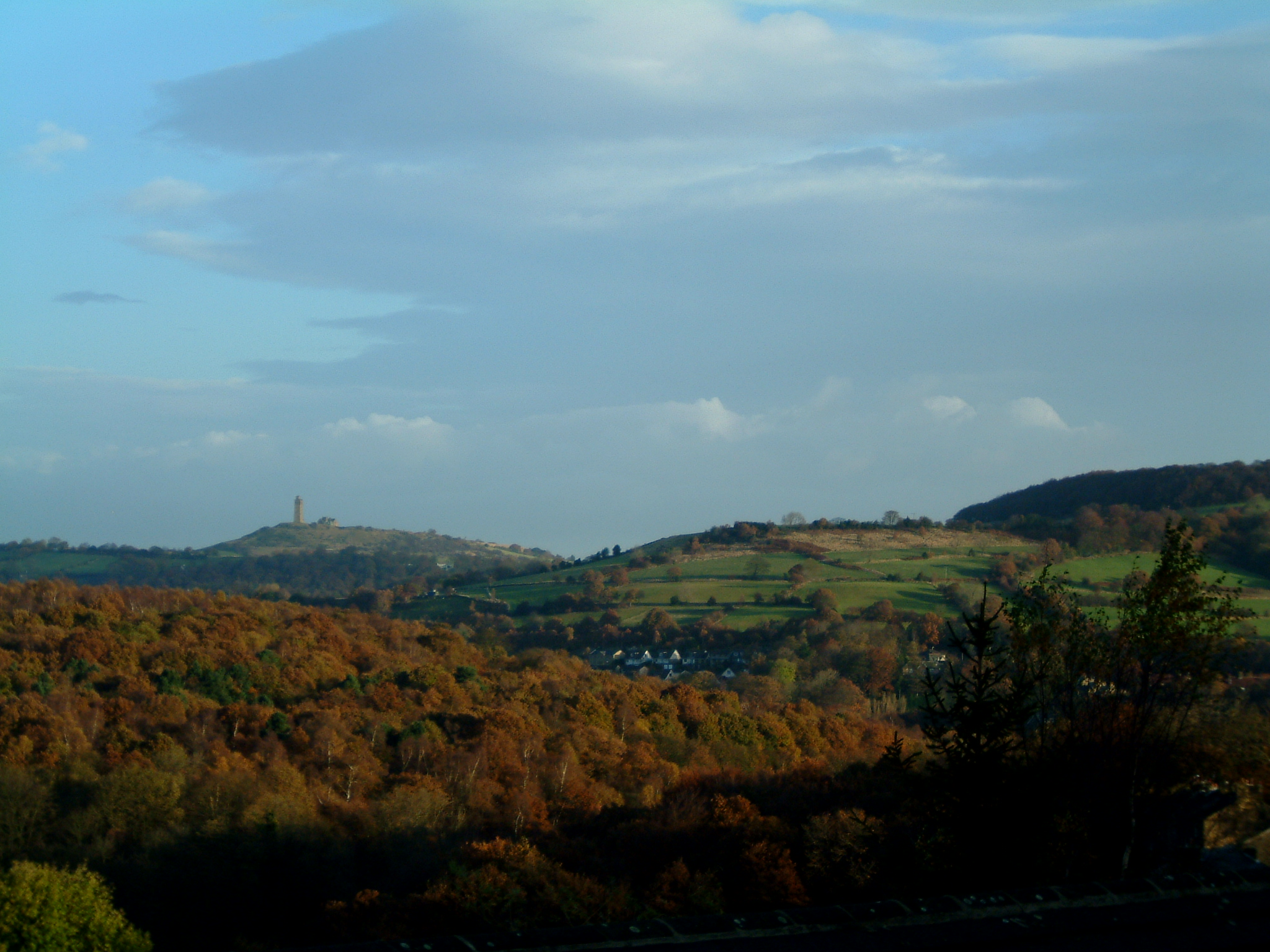
- View from Thongsbridge towards Castle Hill

- Location within West Yorkshire
- Population: 1,220
- OS grid reference: SE150098
- Metropolitan borough: Kirklees
- Metropolitan county: West Yorkshire
- Region: Yorkshire and the Humber
- Country: England
- Sovereign state: United Kingdom
- Post town: Holmfirth
- Postcode district: HD9
- Dialling code: 01484
- Police: West Yorkshire
- Fire: West Yorkshire
- Ambulance: Yorkshire
- UK Parliament: Colne Valley

Thongsbridge is a small village in the Kirklees district of West Yorkshire, England. It is in the semi-rural Holme Valley and the village boundaries merge into the neighbouring communities of Holmfirth, New Mill and Wooldale. According to the 2001 Census, it covers an area of 124.7 hectares (308 acres).

== History ==
The name of the village is derived from the old Viking word ‘thong’ meaning a strip of land.

One of the first records of Thongsbridge is from the early 13th century when the area was owned by the Bisset family. The village expanded in the early days of the industrial revolution, its location, within the steep-sided valley, being ideal for the water powered textile mills.

The homes and businesses located in the valley bottom were affected by a number of floods that affected the Holme Valley. The Holmfirth Flood of 1852 being amongst the most severe, with a number of houses and parts of the local textile mill being swept away.

The village originally had a station on the railway branch line going from Brockholes and terminating in Holmfirth built by Lancashire and Yorkshire Railway company in 1850. The railway partially closed in 1959 with passenger services being stopped and then finally shut down to freight trains as well in 1965. The goods yard and railway trackbed have now mostly been built on but can still be seen in places.

On 6 July 2014, Stage 2 of the 2014 Tour de France from York to Sheffield, passed through the village.

== Sport and leisure facilities ==
Leisure facilities in the village include fitness centres located at the nearby Holmfirth High School Sports Centre and Thongsbridge tennis club, which is located in the valley bottom, adjacent to the Cricket club and bowling club.

Thongsbridge Cricket Club was formed in 1860 and was one of the founding members of the Huddersfield and District Alliance League in 1893. The team currently plays in the Huddersfield Cricket League.

Thongsbridge Tennis Club is one of the most progressive and dynamic tennis clubs in Britain.Thongsbridge Tennis Club Website

Thongsbridge Athletic FC competed in the Huddersfield District League until they folded in the 2000s.

Since 2008, Holme Valley Black Belt Academy has been set up in the old Thongsbridge mills (previously at the Holmfirth Civic Hall).

== Politics ==
Thongsbridge is part of the Colne Valley constituency, which has been represented by Jason McCartney (Conservative) since 2019; he also represented the area between 2010 and 2017. The constituency was previously represented by Thelma Walker (Labour) from 2017 to 2019 and by Kali Mountford (Labour) from 1997 to 2010.

At a local level, the village is part of the Holme Valley South Ward which has 3 councillors who represent the area at Kirklees Council. The Metropolitan District Council is responsible for all aspects of local services and policy, including planning, transport, roads (except trunk roads and motorways), public rights of way, education, social services and libraries. The three Holme Valley South Councillors are currently Donald Firth (Conservative), Moses Crook (Labour & Co-operative) and Paul Davies (Labour).

== Surrounding villages ==
Thongsbridge is adjacent to the town of Holmfirth and is also surrounded by several villages, including: Netherthong, Honley, Brockholes, New Mill and Wooldale.
