= Holmfirth branch line =

Disused railway line in West Yorkshire, England

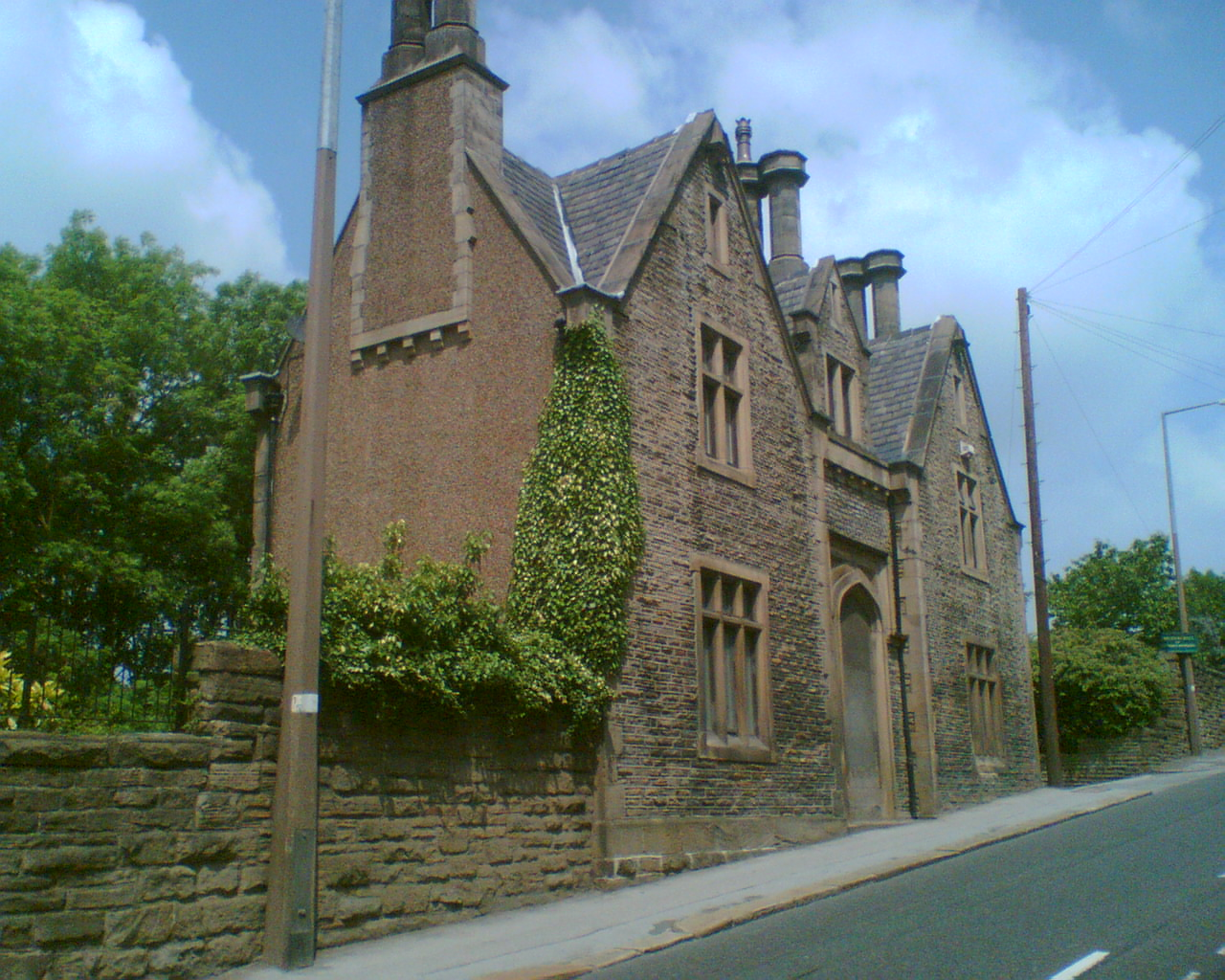
- Holmfirth station building

Overview
- Status: closed
- Locale: West Yorkshire
- Termini: Brockholes; Holmfirth
- Stations: 2

History
- Opened: 1 July 1850
- Closed: 2 November 1959

Technical
- Line length: 2 mi (3.2 km)
- Number of tracks: Double
- Track gauge: 4 ft 8 1/2 in (1,435 mm) standard gauge

Route of the Holmfirth branch line

The Holmfirth branch line is a disused railway line that ran for 2 miles (3.2 km) from Brockholes to Holmfirth, in West Yorkshire, England. The line was built as double track as there were plans to extend the line up the Holme Valley.

== Construction ==
The Holmfirth branch was built by the Lancashire and Yorkshire Railway company. It was due to open on 24 June 1850 but problems meant this was delayed until 1 July 1850, when the first train left Holmfirth at 11:25 a.m. In the first week of operation 1,869 tickets were sold at Holmfirth, along with another 674 at the intermediate station of Thongsbridge.

Extensions to the line were proposed on a number of occasions, none of which saw any progress. Parliamentary authority was granted for a scheme in 1847, before the line was opened, which was costed at £56,000, however the powers lapsed in 1852 without any progress. One proposal was to extend the line up the Holme Valley, tunnel under Holme Moss, and connect with the Manchester, Sheffield and Lincolnshire Railway.

== The route ==
The line ran from a junction with the Penistone Line near Brockholes railway station and headed south across Mytholmbridge Viaduct before reaching Thongsbridge station, then continued to Holmfirth station.

=== Mytholmbridge Viaduct ===
Mytholmbridge Viaduct was the source of some concern for members of the travelling public. The planned embankment had been replaced by timber trestle which was damaged by winds during construction. In an attempt to reassure the public of the safety of this and the Denby Dale Viaduct, L&YR appointed Robert Stephenson to produce a report on the structure, published 16 September 1851, in which he concluded that "both structures are perfectly safe".

Despite petitions calling for its replacement, it remained in place until 1865 when the L&YR finally commissioned a stone replacement. This too collapsed during construction on 3 December 1865, taking the trestle with it. This closed the line until 11 March 1867 when the 13 arch stone viaduct was completed.

=== Thongsbridge station ===
Thongsbridge station was situated in a deep cutting spanned by two bridges, one at each end. In the original layout, the platforms were staggered either side of Heys Road bridge with the main buildings on the Huddersfield bound platform. This layout was criticised by the Board of Trade after a number of accidents involving passengers.

In 1893 the L&YR commissioned Robert Leak & Co to build a new platform opposite the station buildings and increase the gap between the two 4 ft 8 1/2 in (1,435 mm) standard gauge running lines from 5 feet 9 inches (1.75 m) to the more usual 6 feet (1.83 m).

1901 saw the Huddersfield bound platform heightened, a new two storey booking office constructed, and an iron-lattice footbridge built across the line. The goods yard was also extended. Initially this was just a single loop of the Huddersfield bound line but this was improved by providing sidings on the site of the old Holmfirth bound platform. This meant that the yard covered both sides of the line and a cart way was built between the two to provide access.

In August 1852 the station was the location of a narrowly avoided rail accident, involving a Hull to Holmfirth train. Due to the slight gradient between Thongsbridge and Holmfirth, half of the carriages became detached from the rest of the train which then continued to Holmfirth. Whilst the detached carriages remained in the station, the station guard spotted another train approaching at speed. He signalled to the driver of the train to stop which it did just 12 inches (30 cm) from the carriages.

=== Holmfirth station ===
Holmfirth station, at the terminus of the line, was located just north of the town centre on Station Road. The Station Masters house, its front door now bricked up, and has been converted to a private house. The station building and main platform itself was demolished and rebuilt in a similar style as a Kingdom Hall of Jehovah's witness. Part of the platform still exists by the Station Masters house.

L&YR installed a 45 ft turntable at the station in March 1883. It was removed in 1938 as Fowler 2-6-4Ts were causing it to deteriorate. Following the removal, most trains operated tender forward to Holmfirth and smokebox forward back.

== Services ==
In the early days, the line was well used with passenger trains regularly consisting of three or more carriages. Most passenger trains were hauled by L&YR 0-4-0T and 0-6-2T locomotives until about 1900 when Aspinall 2-4-2Ts were introduced.

Freight trains during the early part of the 20th century were hauled by L&YR 'A' class 0-6-0Ts and 0-8-0s. The principal traffic was coal coming into the area and woollen goods taken out.

Following the Holmfirth Flood in 1852, sightseeing trains brought passengers to the town to see the devastation for themselves.

== Closure ==
The closure of the woollen piece warehouse, which saw little use after World War II, was one of the first antecedents of a decrease in traffic on the line. Increased competition from buses with resultant falling receipts led to closure of the line being announced with the last passenger train running on 31 October 1959 hauled by 2-6-4T engines, numbers 42116 and 42413. Freight trains continued to run until 3 May 1965.

The line was dismantled in 1966. Mytholmbridge Viaduct was demolished in 1976.

== See also ==
- Locomotives of the Lancashire and Yorkshire Railway
