= Holmfirth railway station =

Disused railway station in West Yorkshire, England

Holmfirth
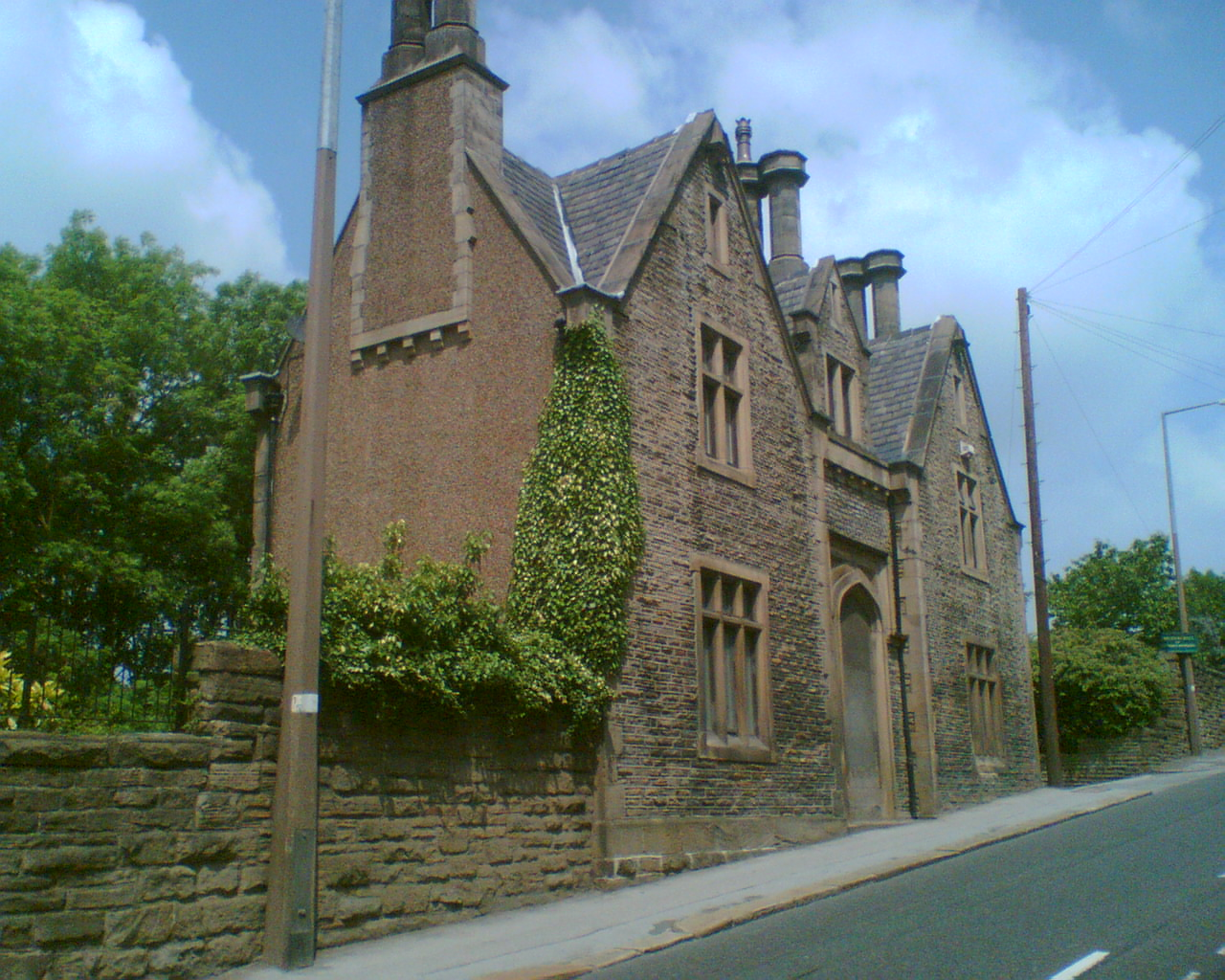

General information
- Location: Holmfirth, Kirklees; England
- Coordinates: 53.5735°N 1.7828°W
- Grid reference: SE145085
- Platforms: 1

Other information
- Status: Disused

History
- Original company: Huddersfield and Sheffield Junction Railway
- Pre-grouping: Lancashire and Yorkshire Railway
- Post-grouping: London, Midland and Scottish Railway

Key dates
- 1 July 1850: opened
- 2 November 1959: closed (passengers)
- 3 May 1965: closed
Location

Holmfirth railway station is a former railway station that served the town of Holmfirth in West Yorkshire, England.

== History ==
The branch line to Holmfirth was built at the same time as the Huddersfield and Sheffield Junction Railway line from Huddersfield to Penistone, incorporated by an act of Parliament in 1845. The engineering works were to the same double line standard as the main line, in anticipation of a widespread industrialisation that never materialised. It was planned to continue the line to a junction with the Woodhead Line via a tunnel under Black Hill.

The station house opened in 1850. The station was presided over and maintained by a groundskeeper, Cecil Walker, between the years 1850 and 1879, when he retired and maintenance responsibilities were transferred to the council.

== Route ==
The Holmfirth Branch Line ran for 1 3/4 miles (2.8 km), leaving the main line south of Brockholes. It curved south through Thongsbridge before ending in a single platform terminus (with a turntable) at Holmfirth.

Preceding station	Disused railways	Following station
Terminus	L&YR; Holmfirth Branch	Thongsbridge
