= Austonley =

Hamlet in West Yorkshire, England

Coordinates: 53.5620°N 1.8288°W

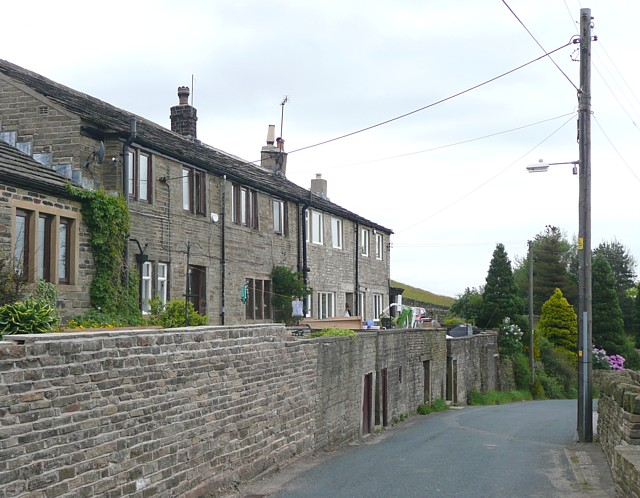
- Town End

- Location within West Yorkshire
- Civil parish: Holme Valley
- Metropolitan borough: Kirklees
- Metropolitan county: West Yorkshire
- Region: Yorkshire and the Humber
- Country: England
- Sovereign state: United Kingdom
- Post town: Holmfirth
- Postcode district: HD9
- Dialling code: 01484
- Police: West Yorkshire
- Fire: West Yorkshire
- Ambulance: Yorkshire

Austonley is a hamlet in the civil parish of Holme Valley, in the Kirklees district, in West Yorkshire, England, about 2 miles (3.2 km) west of Holmfirth.

== History ==
The name "Austonley" means Alstan's wood/clearing'. Austonley was recorded in the Domesday Book as Alstaneslei/Alstanesleie. Austonley was formerly a township in the parish of Almondbury, in 1866 Austonley became a separate civil parish, on 1 April 1921 the parish was abolished and merged with Holmfirth. In 1911 the parish had a population of 1356.
