= Ashley Jackson (artist) =

English painter (born 1940)

- Born: 1940 (age 85–86)
- Years active: 1963–present

Ashley Jackson (born 1940) is an English landscape watercolourist. Raised in Barnsley, then in the West Riding of Yorkshire, he opened his first gallery in 1963. He lives in the town of Holmfirth, near Huddersfield, where his gallery is also located.

== Career ==
Jackson's artworks have been exhibited internationally. Jackson was honoured when one of his original watercolours was presented to Bill Clinton, an avid art collector.

Jackson has been featured on television programmes, including a series about him that ran on PBS from 1984 to 1988 entitled Ashley Jackson's World of Art; a documentary on Jackson in 1981 entitled Once in a Lifetime - My Own Flesh and Blood; and in 2000, a celebratory program entitled Some Days are Diamond in recognition of Jackson's sixtieth birthday and his contribution to the arts. Jackson also presented the television show A Brush With Ashley for nine series between 1990 - 2001. He also appeared in The Last of the Summer Wine episode "The Loxley Lozenge" (1984) as the painter.

Ashley Jackson is also involved with the annual Walker Morris' calendar competition, which raises funds for the Martin House Children's Hospice.

== Honours ==
Jackson was honoured as a Yorkshire Icon, recognising him as a uniquely important and inspirational person to the people of Yorkshire. In addition, in 2009, Yorkshire Bank introduced a debit card decorated with an original painting by Jackson to commemorate their 150th anniversary. Jackson praised the card by stating, "Customers will genuinely have a piece of Yorkshire in their pocket – representing Yorkshire and art wherever they use the card, be it New York, London or Newcastle." To convey his love for Yorkshire, he further added, "The greatest thing about it is Yorkshire, the county of Yorkshire, has helped me to where I am today."

== Books ==
Jackson has also published a number of books about his technique and style.

- 2006, 50 Golden Years – Dalesman
- 2000, Ashley Jackson's Yorkshire Moors- A love Affair - Dalesman
- 1994, Painting the British Isles -a watercolourists journey - Boxtree
- 1993, A Brush With Ashley - Boxtree
- 1992, 'Painting in the Open Air' - Harper Collins
- 1981, My Brush With Fortune - Secker and Warburg
- 1981, Ashley Jackson’s Worlds of Art - vol. 1,2 & 3 Alexander Art Corporation
- 1981, An Artists Notebook
