= Holy Trinity Church, Holmfirth =

Anglican church in Holmfirth, West Yorkshire, England

Holy Trinity, Holmfirth
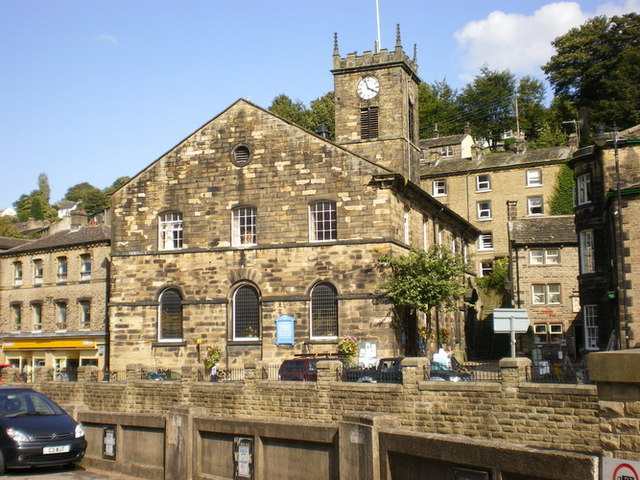
- Holy Trinity, Holmfirth
- 53.5701°N 1.7858°W
- Denomination: Anglican

Architecture
- Functional status: Active
- Heritage designation: Grade II
- Designated: 16 January 1967
- Architect: Joseph Jagger
- Style: Neo Gothic
- Years built: c. 1780

Administration
- Diocese: Leeds

Holy Trinity Church, Holmfirth is an Anglican church in the town of Holmfirth in West Yorkshire, England.

Holmfirth's chapelry historically covered townships which lay on or near the boundary between the parishes of Kirkburton and Almondbury: Wooldate, Hepworth and Cartworth in Kirkburton, and Holme, Austonley and Upperthong in Almondbury. Like many rural parishes, these covered wide areas, but with the rise in urbanisation and the corresponding population increases, these parishes have since been subdivided and new churches have been built.

== History ==
A church in Holmfirth is first recorded during the 1480s; a grant was made by Edward IV to the church (and confirmed by Richard III). The first stone building being completed in 1500. The church was demolished and rebuilt in 1632, with the seating capacity increased. In 1635, the incoming curate, one John Bynns, obtained a commission from the Ecclesiastical Court to allot all the seats to the congregation, most of whom did not know their seats. The congregation, who were then required to pay ten pence per year for their seats, revolted and refused to pay. Legal proceedings were subsequently launched and lasted until 1639, when Bynns received compensation, though he remained deeply unpopular with the congregation, who tried to displace him in 1646, though appear to have been unsuccessful. Bynns died soon after this. The church was elevated to the status of a parish church in 1651 or 1652.

The church was severely damaged in a flood in 1777, and was subsequently replaced by the present church, which dates from the 1780s, The tower, originally containing six bells, was added at a later date and in 1934 the bells increased to 8 in total. The church became Grade II listed in 1967.

The parish church graveyard was converted into a memorial garden, the Holmside Gardens, in the mid-1960s.

The church installed a disabled access ramp in 2019. In 2020, the ramp was vandalised by an unknown offender who left a note explaining that their reason for doing so was a desire to see the historic steps reinstated.
