= Thongs Bridge railway station =

Disused railway station in West Yorkshire, England

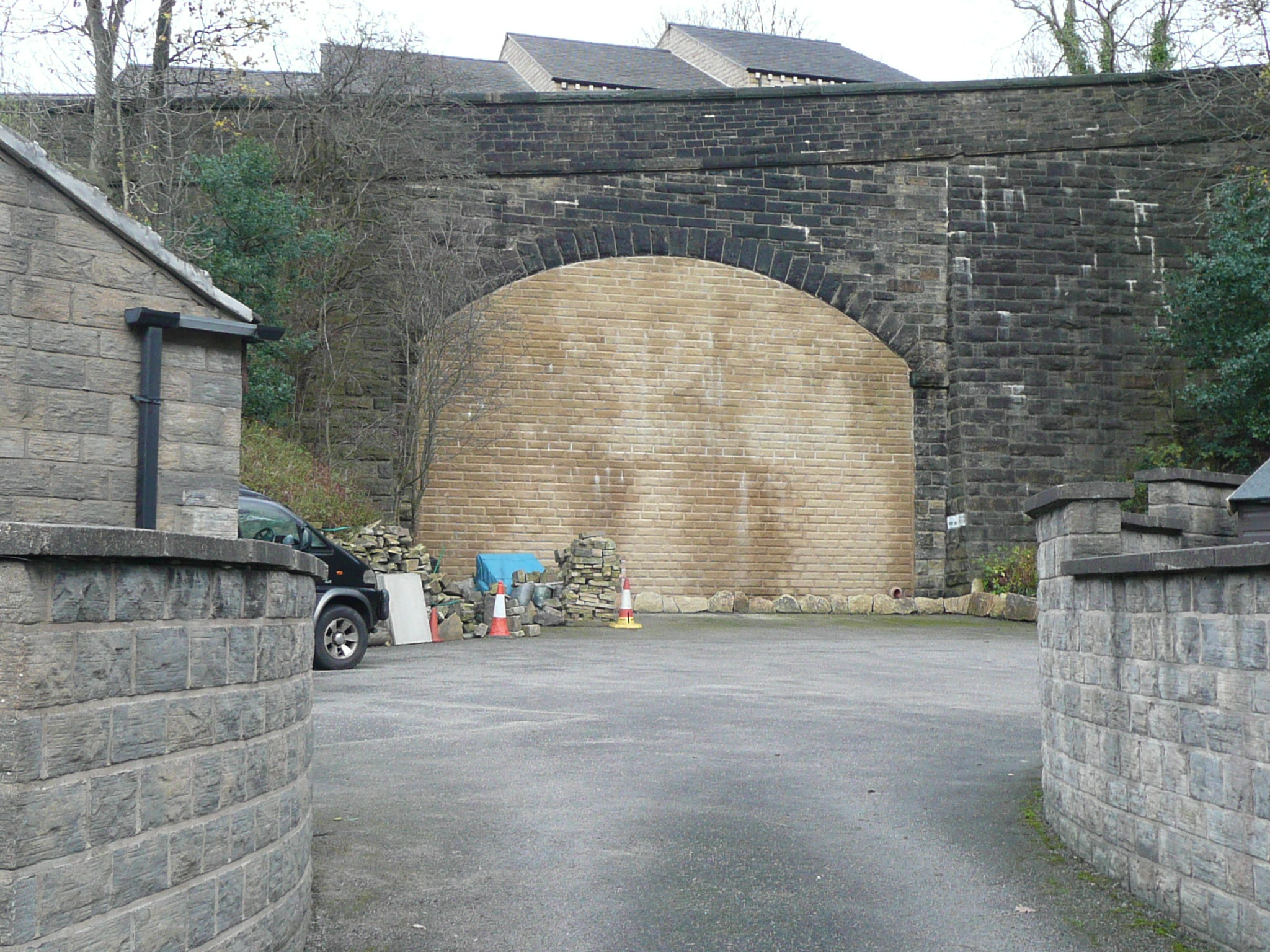
- Walled-up railway bridge, Thongsbridge

General information
- Location: Thongsbridge, West Yorkshire; England
- Coordinates: 53.5842°N 1.7728°W
- Grid reference: SE151097
- System: Heavy rail
- Line: Holmfirth branch line
- Platforms: 2
- Tracks: 2

Other information
- Status: Closed

History
- Original company: Lancashire and Yorkshire Railway
- Pre-grouping: London and North Western Railway
- Post-grouping: London, Midland and Scottish Railway

Key dates
- 1 July 1850: Station opened
- 3 December 1865: Station closed
- 11 March 1867: Station reopened
- 2 November 1959: Station closed to passengers
- 3 May 1965: Station closed completely
Location

Thongs Bridge railway station was the only intermediate stop on the railway line between Brockholes and Holmfirth, West Yorkshire, England. Opened in July 1850, the station was temporarily closed in 1865 due to the collapse of Mytholmbridge Viaduct. The station closed to passengers permanently in 1959, closing completely in 1965.

== History ==
Thongs Bridge railway station was opened with the Holmfirth branch in July 1850. It was the only intermediate station on the branch between Brockholes railway station, and the terminus at Holmfirth. The station was 5 3/4 miles (9.3 km) south of Huddersfield, (1-mile (1.6 km) south of the junction with Penistone Line at Brockholes), and 1-mile (1.6 km) north of Holmfirth. The line through the station was double track, and each track had a platform face; Holmfirth station had only a single platform. The station was developed within a rock cutting with steep sides, and was equipped with a goods yard, which was south-west of the station and had a 3 tonnes (3.3 tons) crane for goods loading and unloading. This stayed open for six years after closure to passengers, ceasing to forward traffic on 3 May 1965.

The collapse of Mytholmbridge Viaduct caused the station to be closed temporarily from 3 December 1865 to 11 March 1867 whilst a replacement viaduct was constructed. The station closed to passengers after the last train on 31 October 1959. In 1961, the branch was singled throughout.

The station was always labelled as Thongs Bridge by the railway, as that was the traditional name of the settlement. Thongsbridge is a modern version of the name.

== Services ==
Initially, the branch operated trains only as far as Brockholes station, but by 1863 seven services along the line extended all the way into Huddersfield. In 1887, services consisted of ten daily out and back workings along the branch. Most were worked from Bradford Exchange, with some starting from Halifax. Sunday saw just three services per day. In 1910, this was 16 services each way, though some only ran as far as Huddersfield or Brockholes. In the last year of Lancashire and Yorkshire Railway operation (1922), services varied between 18 and 19 depending on the day of the week, with three services on a Sunday. In 1938, under London Midland Scottish operation, it had risen to twenty trains per day.

During the Second World War, services had dropped to seven each way, with no Sunday service. In 1946, the station saw eleven services a day, though at least one other passenger train along the branch did not call at Thongs Bridge. The Sunday service was also absent. In 1951, under British Railways, the service pattern had dropped to just six services per day, with only three per day in 1959 when the line closed to passengers.

| Preceding station | Disused railways | Following station |
|---|---|---|
| Holmfirth | L&YR; Holmfirth Branch | Brockholes |
