= River Ribble, West Yorkshire =

River in West Yorkshire, England

Coordinates: 53.567°N 1.783°W

River Ribble
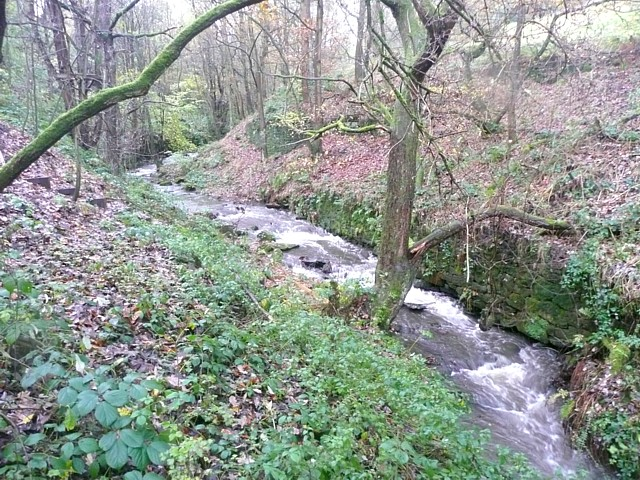
- The River Ribble near Holmfirth

Location
- Country: England

Physical characteristics
- Discharge
  - location: River Holme

The River Ribble is a minor river running through the town of Holmfirth in Kirklees, West Yorkshire, England.

Rising at the outflow of Holme Styes Reservoir, itself fed by Reynard Clough (which has a tributary, Catholes Gutter), Hades Clough and Long Ing Dike, the Ribble flows northwards, collecting Fox Clough and Beaver Clough from the west, before joining the River Holme by Towngate and Hollowgate in Holmfirth. The confluence of the two rivers was also marked by a weir, but this was removed in 1944 when Italian prisoners of war were tasked with removing it.
