= Holmfirth =

Town in West Yorkshire, England

Coordinates: 53.570°N 1.787°W

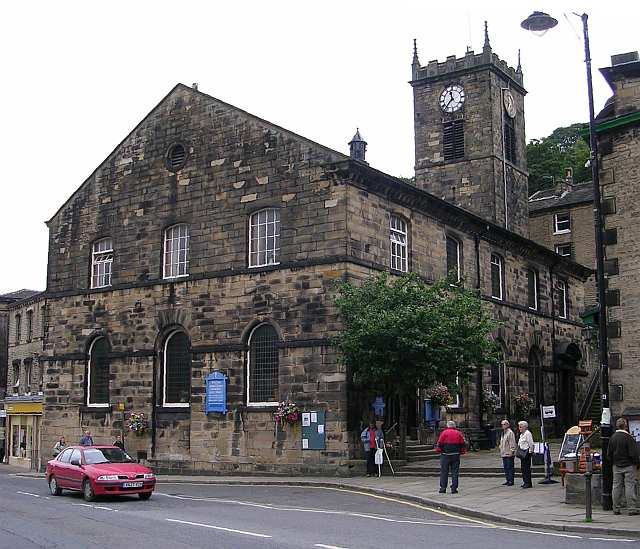
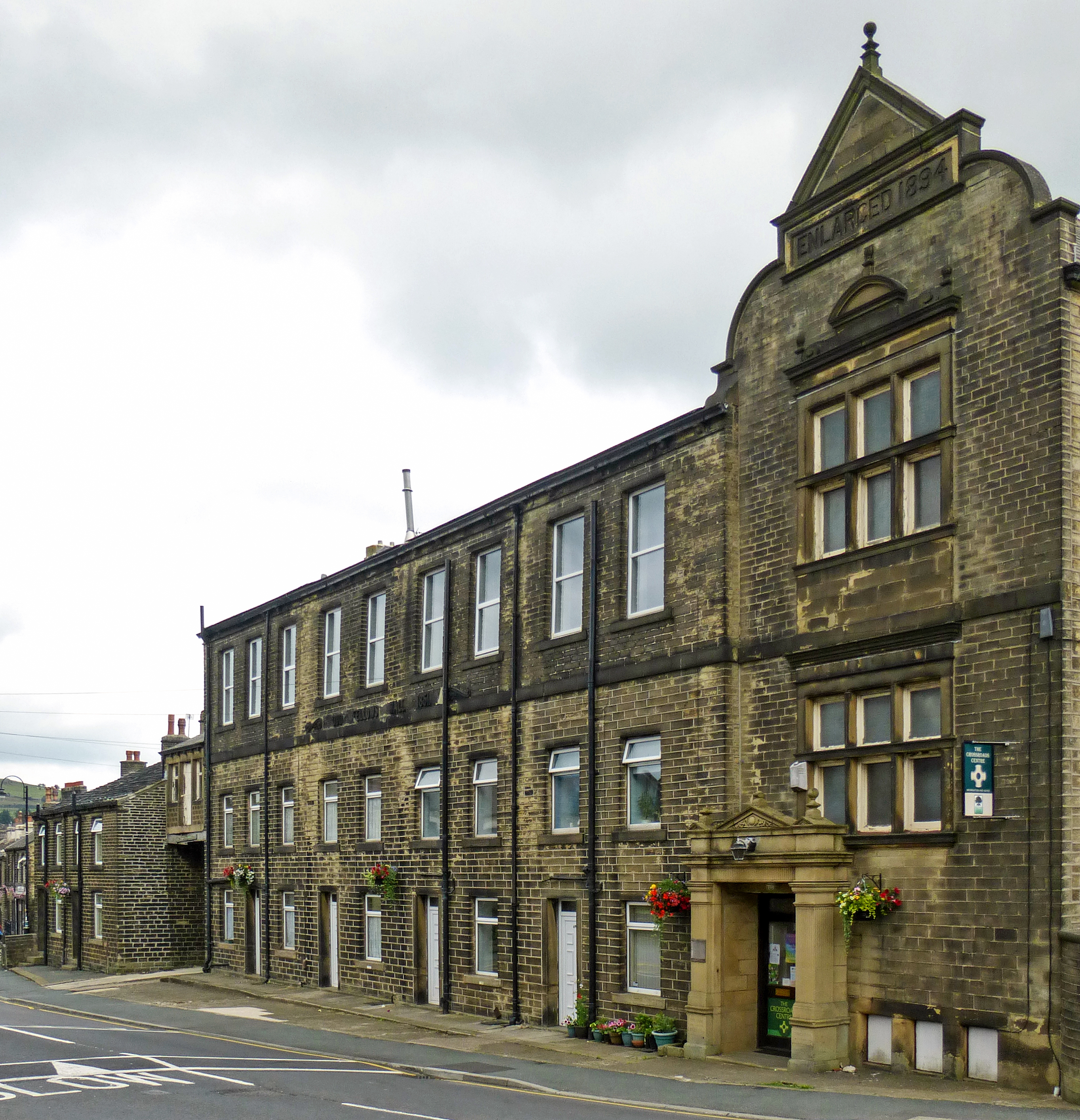
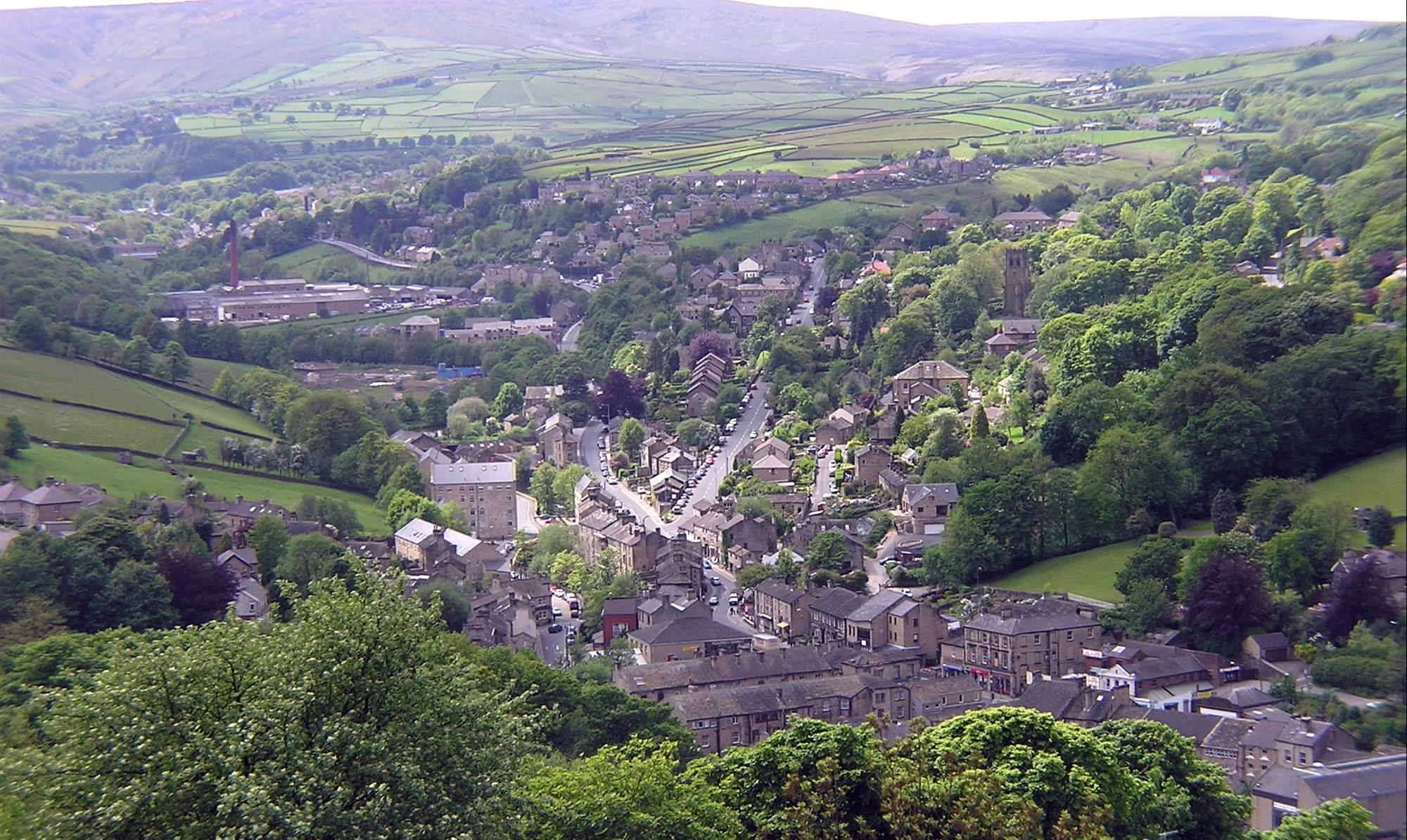
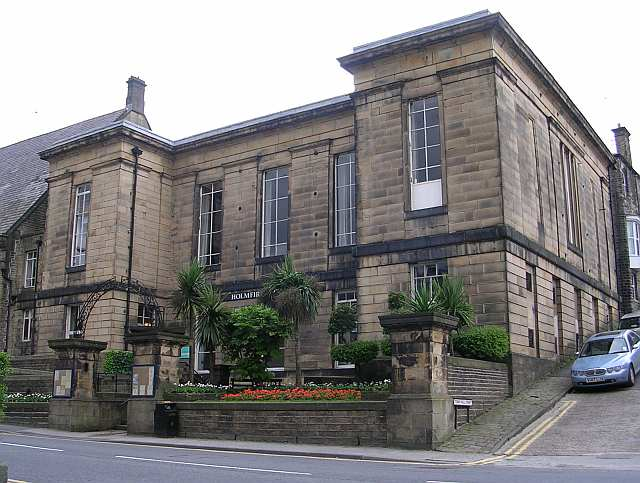
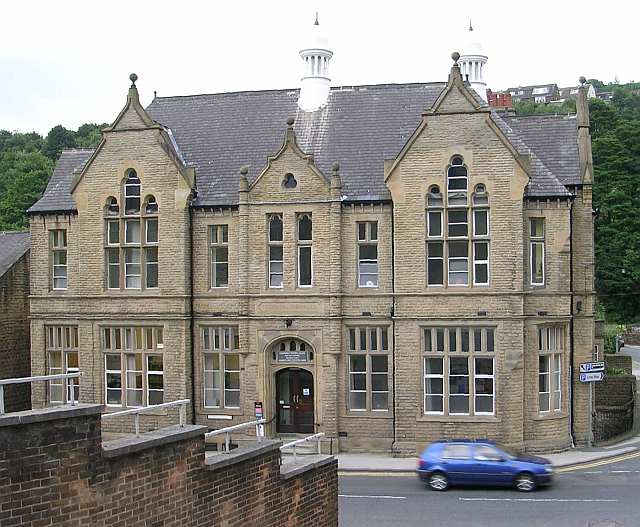
- Holy Trinity Church Lanedyke House Aerial View of Holmfirth Civic Hall Technical Institute

- Location within West Yorkshire
- Population: 5,173
- OS grid reference: SE142081
- Civil parish: Holme Valley
- Metropolitan borough: Kirklees
- Metropolitan county: West Yorkshire
- Region: Yorkshire and the Humber
- Country: England
- Sovereign state: United Kingdom
- Post town: HOLMFIRTH
- Postcode district: HD9
- Dialling code: 01484
- Police: West Yorkshire
- Fire: West Yorkshire
- Ambulance: Yorkshire
- UK Parliament: Colne Valley

Holmfirth (/ˈhoʊmfɜːrθ/) is a town in the Metropolitan Borough of Kirklees, West Yorkshire, England, 6 miles (9.7 km) south of Huddersfield and 14 miles (23 km) west of Barnsley; the boundary of the Peak District National Park is 2 miles (3.2 km) to the south-west. The town is on the A635 and A6024 roads in the Holme Valley, at the confluence of the Rivers Holme and Ribble. It mostly consists of stone-built cottages nestled on the eastern slopes of the Pennine hills.

Historically part of the West Riding of Yorkshire, Holmfirth was a centre for pioneering film-making by Bamforth & Co., which later switched to the production of saucy seaside postcards. Between 1973 and 2010, Holmfirth and the Holme Valley became well known as the filming location of the BBC's situation comedy Last of the Summer Wine. In 2023, the filming location of Sid's Cafe in the town centre was preserved. There is a Last of Summer Wine museum, which was opened by Bill Owen who played Compo, and holiday makers can stay in Nora Batty's cottage as well as take a bus tour of filming locations.

Thousands of tourists flock to the area each year to enjoy scenery and locations familiar from the series. Filming of the TV Slaithwaite-based drama, Where the Heart Is, had also taken place in and around the area.

== History ==
The name Holmfirth derives from Old English holegn ('holly'), in the name of Holme, compounded with Middle English frith ('wood'). It thus meant 'the woods at Holme'.

The town grew around a corn mill and bridge in the 13th century. Three hundred years later Holmfirth expanded rapidly as the cloth trade grew and the production of stone and slates from the surrounding quarries increased. The parish church was built in 1778 after the church built in 1476 was swept away in a flood the previous year. Dr Albert Lister Peace was the church's organist, at the age of nine, in the early 1850s. In 1850 Holmfirth railway station opened, on the branch line built by the Lancashire and Yorkshire Railway Company.

Local men who served and died in the First and Second World Wars are commemorated on the Holme Valley War Memorial found outside Holme Valley Memorial Hospital.

=== Bamforth & Co ===
Holmfirth was the home of Bamforth & Co Ltd, who were well known for their cheeky seaside postcards – although around the time of the First World War, they produced postcards of a more sober nature. The printing works on Station Road has been converted into residential flats.

Bamforth's company was early pioneer of film-making, before it abandoned the business in favour of postcards. During the early 1900s Holmfirth was well known for film making; during the periods 1898–1900 and 1913–1915, Bamforth and Co. produced what the British Film Institute describes as 'a modest but historically significant collection of films'.

=== Flooding ===
Fooding has, at different times occurred in the Holme Valley affecting the town and other settlements. The earliest recorded Holmfirth flood was in 1738 and the most recent was 1944. The most severe flood occurred early on the morning of 5 February 1852, when the embankment of the Bilberry Reservoir collapsed, causing the deaths of 81 people. Following a severe storm in 1777 the River Holme burst its banks, sweeping away people and property with the loss of three lives; the stone church, built in 1476, was swept away. A storm in 1821 again caused the river to burst its banks. The flooding on the night of 29 May 1944 was not nationally reported and was overshadowed by the D-Day landings the following week.

=== Property ===
The former Lodge's supermarket building had been sitting empty in the heart of the town since the Co-op moved to new premises in Crown Bottom, formerly an open area used as a market and a place for public meetings: the suffragist Selina Cooper spoke there in 1913. Lodge's was built in the 1970s by the prominent local grocery company. It was opened by Radio 1 DJ Tony Blackburn and occupied an unusual location over the River Holme beside the town's small bus station. Lodge's was bought in the 1990s by Co-operative Retail Services who eventually closed the store in 1997 after investing in a new £2 million supermarket for the town. Local residents, led by the Holme Valley Business Association, campaigned for its demolition. Their campaign was featured in the 2005 Channel 4 documentary, Demolition. The building has since been converted into several smaller shops, including a Sainsbury's Local store, with some accommodation on the top floor.

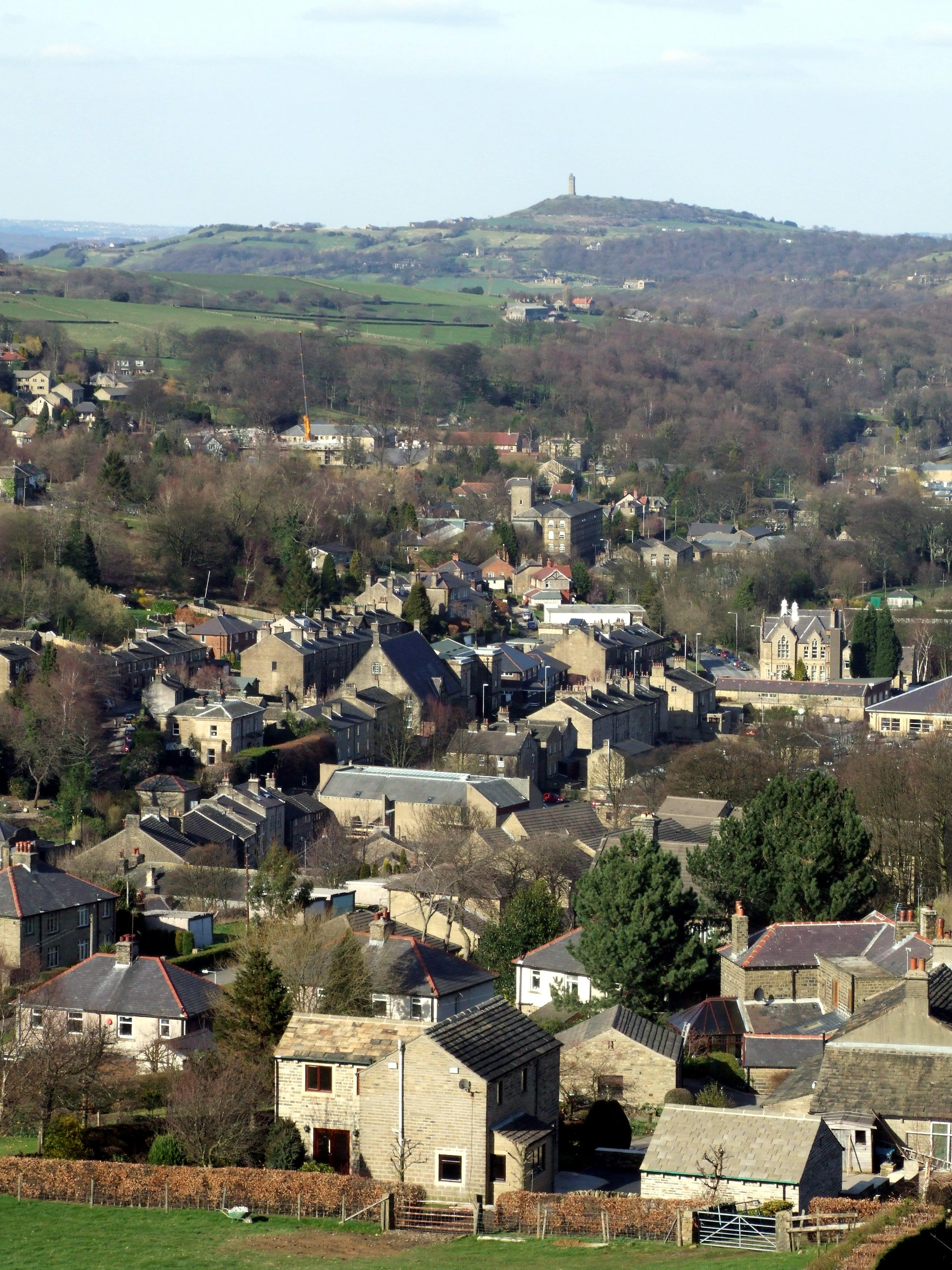
View across Holmfirth to Castle Hill, Huddersfield, taken from Dunsley Bank Road

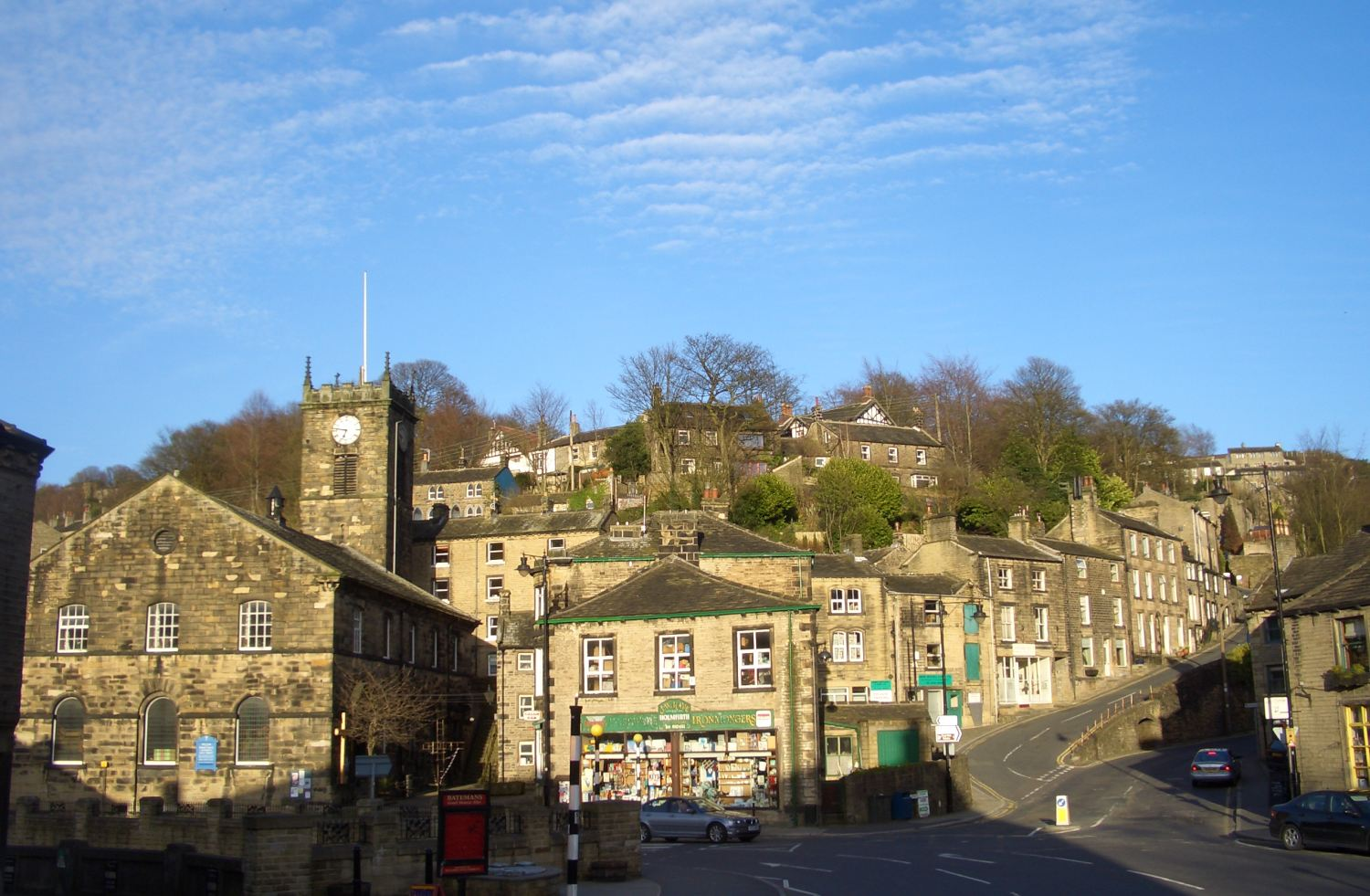
Holmfirth centre showing the parish church

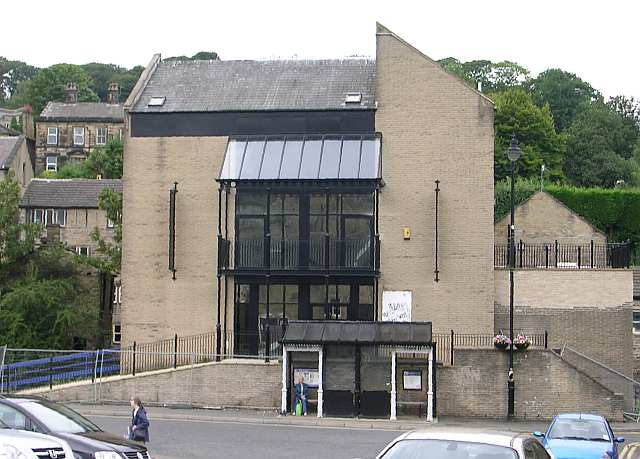
Former supermarket built spanning the River Holme

== Governance ==
The area was administered until 1974 by Holmfirth Urban District Council, which was based at the Council Offices in Huddersfield Road in Holmfirth. Since then, Holmfirth has been administered by Kirklees Council. At the lowest tier the local parish council is Holme Valley Parish Council.

== Education ==
=== Primary education ===
Holmfirth's only primary school is Holmfirth Junior, Infant, and Nursery School located on Cartworth Road; however, there are many other primary schools in villages and hamlets closely surrounding Holmfirth. In 2017, 82% of the school's student were achieving the expected standard for their age and 12% were exceeding the expected standard.

=== Secondary education ===
Holmfirth High School is a coeducational secondary school that takes in students from the local primary schools named above as well as students from neighbouring villages and hamlets. The school has over 1,300 pupils, split over five-year groups from years 7 to 11. As of June 2023, the school has an Ofsted rating of "outstanding".

== Economy ==
Holmfirth's economy is dominated by rural and tourism activities. A 2013 youth survey identified reducing opportunities for young adults in the area and an intention to leave to find employment. The survey resulted in a successful bid for lottery funding to create new opportunities and training to increase employment opportunities in the area. Tourism economic activity is increasing with several accommodation and tourist pursuits developing in the town including booking software to manage and market accommodation. New holiday accommodation includes that linked to the new Winery in Cartworth Moor.

Longley Farm, a manufacturer of dairy products founded in 1948, is a significant employer in the town.

== Sport ==
On 6 July 2014, Stage 2 of the 2014 Tour de France, from York to Sheffield, passed through the town. The event was televised internationally and attracted huge crowds cheering the riders through the town. Holmfirth Cycling Club was formed in 2013 and, with over 400 members by 2016 became the fastest growing cycling club in the UK.

Holmfirth Harriers is an over one hundred year old running group from the area.

Holmfirth Cricket Club plays just out of the centre of town next to the river Holme.

There are also many local village football teams, such as the Holme Valley Academicals, playing in the Huddersfield District League. Underbank Rangers, one of the most famous amateur Rugby League clubs, are based in the town.

== Media ==
Local news and television programmes are provided by BBC Yorkshire and ITV Yorkshire. Television signals are received from the Emley Moor and local relay transmitters.

Local radio stations are BBC Radio Leeds on 92.4 FM, Heart Yorkshire on 106.2 FM, Capital Yorkshire on 105.6 FM, Greatest Hits Radio West Yorkshire on 96.3 FM and Hits Radio West Yorkshire on 102.5 FM.

The town is served by the local newspapers, Huddersfield Daily Examiner and The Yorkshire Post.

== Transport ==
=== Railway ===
The nearest National Rail station is at Brockholes, 2.2 miles (3.5 km) from the town centre. Northern Trains operates a regular service along the Penistone Line between Huddersfield, Barnsley and Sheffield.

The town was previously served by Holmfirth railway station, which was at the end of a short branch line, which diverged from the Penistone Line just south of Brockholes. A viaduct took the line across the valley and into Thongsbridge where another station was sited. The line then went along the side of the valley coming to a halt just outside the town centre on Station Road. Plans did exist for the line to be extended up the valley and then tunnel under Black Hill to join the Woodhead line between Manchester Piccadilly and Sheffield Victoria. The line closed to passengers in 1959, with freight traffic lasting until 1965. Holmfirth's station building and platform still remain as a private house. Other sections of the line further down the valley have been sold for private housing, the viaduct crossing the valley from the A616 (New Mill Road) at Brockholes, over Spring Wood, has been demolished.

The station was presided over and maintained by a groundskeeper, Cecil Walker, between the years 1850 and 1879, when he retired and maintenance responsibilities were transferred to the council.

=== Buses ===
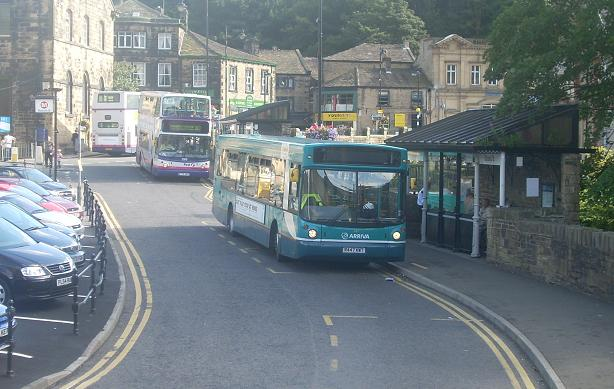
Holmfirth bus station

Holmfirth bus station is located in the centre of the town, from which regular services take varying routes around the outlying villages and to Huddersfield's bus and railway stations. Additional routes connect the town with Barnsley, Sheffield, Wakefield, Denby Dale, Penistone, Slaithwaite and Honley. Limited services operate to Castleton and Glossop in north Derbyshire, and Uppermill, which is historically part of Yorkshire, in Greater Manchester. Services are operated by First Calderdale & Huddersfield, Team Pennine, Stott's Coaches and South Pennine Community Transport.

== Culture ==
Holmfirth's Film Festival and Festival of Folk are held every May, and its Arts Festival takes place over two weeks in June.

=== Holmfirth Feast ===
An annual Holmfirth Feast, with amusements and bazaars, took place during the mid-nineteenth century at Crown Bottom. The feast is associated with an unusual choral folk song known as the Holmfirth Anthem.

=== Holmfirth Choral Society ===
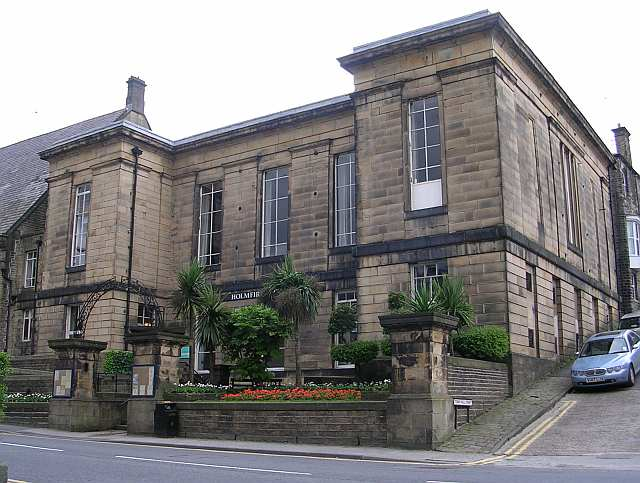
Holmfirth Civic Hall

Holmfirth Choral Society hold regular classical choral music concerts in Holmfirth Civic Hall and the Holme Valley Orchestra plays throughout the year.

Holmfirth's Film Festival and Festival of Folk are held every May, and its Arts Festival takes place over two weeks in June.

=== Film festival ===
The town's cinema, the Picturedrome, which opened in 1912 as the Valley Theatre, is now a live music venue and has been nominated for the NME Best Small Venue. It hosts various music events. Acts such as Adam Ant, Bad Manners, Buzzcocks, Evile, Fish, Half Man Half Biscuit, Hawkwind, John Martyn, Ocean Colour Scene, the Red Hot Chilli Pipers, Ron Sexsmith, Saxon, Suzi Quatro and the Beat have performed.

=== Art week ===
Holmfirth Art Week, with its July exhibition in the Civic Hall, raises money for Macmillan Cancer Relief.

=== Holmfirth Festival of Folk ===
The Holmfirth Festival of Folk takes place in May of each year, featuring a wide selection of folk music and folk dance acts from around the UK. Performances take place in a variety of indoor and outdoor venues throughout the town.

=== Holmfirth Arts Festival ===
Holmfirth Arts Festival is a multi-arts festival which celebrates the creativity, ideas, people and landscape of the Holme Valley. Its ticketed, community engagement, outdoor arts and arts in the landscape programmes take place throughout the year, culminating in an annual four-day festival on the second weekend in June.

=== Brass bands ===
The Holme Valley Brass Band Contest takes place each year at the civic hall.

== Notable people ==
Actress Jessica Gunning, who won an Emmy Award for her role in Baby Reindeer, was born in Holmfirth in 1986. The artist Ashley Jackson lives in Holmfirth, where his gallery is also located.

The Last of the Summer Wine actors Bill Owen and Peter Sallis are both buried in the graveyard at St John’s Parish Church in Upperthong.

== Surrounding villages ==
While the town of Holmfirth itself is comparatively small, it is surrounded by several hamlets and villages. These neighbouring settlements are often collectively referred to as "Holmfirth", and include Austonley, Arrunden, Burnlee, Cinderhills, Cliff, Deanhouse, Netherthong, Gully, Flushhouse, Hade Edge, Thongsbridge, Upperthong and Washpit. Many of these are located on Cartworth Moor.

Other villages and hamlets within the Holmfirth post town include Brockholes, Fulstone, Jackson Bridge, Hepworth, Holme, Holmbridge, Honley, Meltham, Netherthong, New Mill, Scholes, Totties, Thongsbridge, Upperthong, Longley, Hade Edge, Underbank and Wooldale.
