= Holmfirth Civic Hall =

Municipal building in Holmfirth, West Yorkshire, England

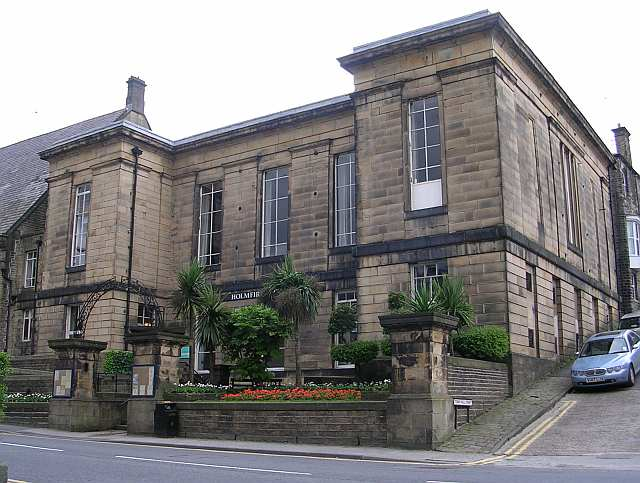
- The building in 2007

- Shown in West Yorkshire
- 53.5723°N 1.7863°W
- Location: Huddersfield Road, Holmfirth

History
- Built: 1842

Site notes
- Architectural styles: Town hall: Neoclassical style Drill Hall: Tudor style

Listed Building – Grade II
- Official name: Civic Hall, boundary wall and gate piers
- Designated: 4 August 1983
- Reference no.: 1227986

Holmfirth Civic Hall is a historic municipal building in Holmfirth, a town in West Yorkshire in England. The civic hall, which is currently used as a public events venue, is a Grade II listed building.

== History ==
The building was originally financed by public subscription and commissioned by the Holmfirth and Literary and Philosophical Society as their meeting place. The site selected was on the west side of the Huddersfield Road and construction work was underway by 1838. It was designed in the neoclassical style, built in ashlar stone at a cost of £2,200 and was officially opened with a dinner, a concert and a ball as Holmfirth Town Hall in 1842.

The magistrates also began holding their petty sessions there, and it also became an important venue for public meetings: the champion of the campaign for a ten-hour working day, Richard Oastler, held a rally in the town hall in April 1844. In March 1866, a new company, known as the Holmfirth Town Hall Company, was formed to acquire the building and to promote it more vigorously as a public events venue.

In the early 1890s, the complex was extended to the southwest to create a drill hall. The drill hall was designed in the Tudor style, built in rubble masonry and was completed in 1892. It was commissioned to serve as the home of the 2nd Volunteer Battalion of the Duke of Wellington's (West Riding) Regiment.

In 1946, Holmfirth Urban District Council purchased both buildings and refurbished them for public use: the complex was then re-opened as Holmfirth Civic Hall on 7 November 1947. However, the council continued to maintain their own offices at 49/51 Huddersfield Road until the council was abolished in 1974.

The civic hall was transferred to the ownership of Holme Valley Parish Council and brought under the management of the newly-formed Holmfirth Civic Hall Community Trust in 2017.

== Architecture ==
The two-storey former town hall building is constructed of stone, and it has a flat roof. The main facade is to the south-east, and it has three central bays, with tall windows, and single-bay wings either side. The building is five bays deep. The former drill hall is designed in the Tudor style, with a large hall and other rooms including an armoury. The whole structure was grade II listed in 1983, along with its boundary wall and gate piers.

== See also ==
- Listed buildings in Holme Valley (central area)
