= Holmfirth floods =

Natural disasters in West Yorkshire, England

Coordinates: 53°33′34″N 1°50′44″W

The Holmfirth floods were instances of severe flooding in the Holme Valley, West Yorkshire, England affecting Holmfirth and other settlements in the valley. The earliest recorded dates from 1738 and the latest from 1944. The most severe flood occurred early on the morning of 5 February 1852, when the embankment of the Bilberry Reservoir collapsed, causing the deaths of 81 people.

== 1738 ==
Rainstorms caused the River Holme to burst its banks and flood the valley. Though there was damage to farmland there was no loss of life.

== 1777 ==
Following a severe storm on Wednesday 21 July 1777 the River Holme burst its banks and flooded the valley. Three people were drowned and a stone church built in 1476 was swept away. It was rebuilt the following year with funding from local clothiers.

== 1821 ==
The River Holme again flooded the valley around Holmfirth, following rainstorms on 21 September 1821, with no loss of life.

== 1852 ==
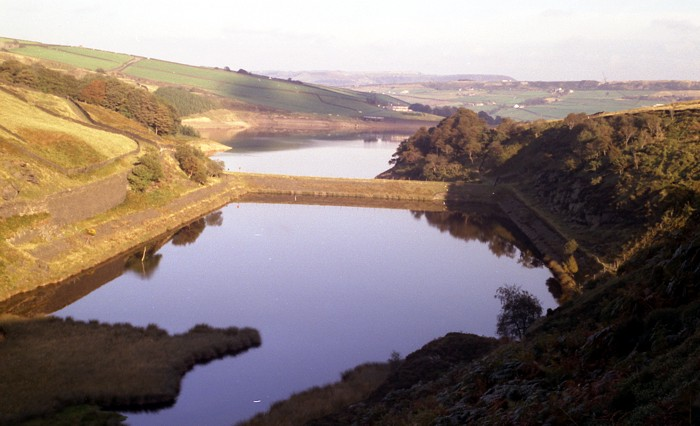
Bilberry and Digley reservoirs

The 1852 flood occurred when the embankment of the Bilberry Reservoir, to the west of Holmfirth, collapsed, releasing 86 million gallons of water into the River Holme. It caused 81 deaths and a large amount of damage to property in the valley, leaving many homeless and without work. The buildings and structures destroyed included four mills, ten dye houses, three drying stoves, 27 cottages, seven tradesmen's houses, seven shops, seven bridges crossing the River Holme, ten warehouses, eight barns and stables.

The collapse occurred at about 01:00 am on 5 February 1852 following a period of heavy rain. The flood made the front page of the London Standard newspaper.

An inquest after the disaster concluded that the reservoir was "defective in its original construction" and that "the Commissioners, in permitting the Bilberry reservoir to remain in a dangerous state with the full knowledge thereof, and not lowering the waste pit, have been guilty of great and culpable negligence". A local monument erected in 1802 to commemorate the Peace of Amiens subsequently became known as the Holmfirth Flood Stone.

== 1944 ==
On Whit Monday, 29 May 1944, flash flooding following a severe thunderstorm, caused the deaths of three people in the Holme Valley. Because of reporting restrictions in place during World War II, it was not widely reported and was overshadowed by the invasion of Normandy a week later. This led to confusion as to the exact cause of the flood but it was confirmed that Bilberry reservoir was not to blame. It was suggested that the reservoir prevented the flood from being more severe. German prisoners of war held in the area, assisted with the rescue of local residents and property. There was extensive damage to properties in the valley: 17 mills, 61 shops and 109 homes were flooded.

Geoffrey Riley (1929–2005), aged 14, was awarded the George Cross in recognition of his attempts to save the life of an elderly woman caught in the flood. The woman and Geoffrey's father, who also tried to save her from drowning, both lost their lives. Geoffrey was initially awarded the Albert Medal but the Royal Warrant was discontinued in 1971 and he exchanged it for the George Cross at Buckingham Palace on 6 March 1973.
