= Holmbridge =

Village in West Yorkshire, England

Coordinates: 53.557404°N 1.819417°W

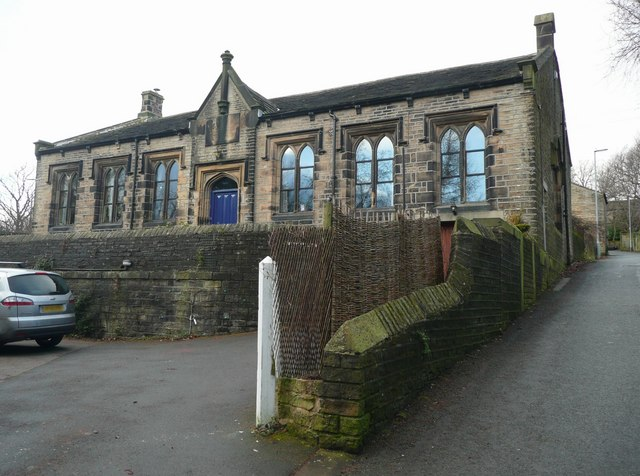
- Former National School, Bank Top Lane, Holmbridge

- Location within West Yorkshire
- Metropolitan borough: Kirklees
- Metropolitan county: West Yorkshire
- Region: Yorkshire and the Humber
- Country: England
- Sovereign state: United Kingdom
- Post town: Holmfirth
- Postcode district: HD9
- Dialling code: 01484
- Police: West Yorkshire
- Fire: West Yorkshire
- Ambulance: Yorkshire
- UK Parliament: Colne Valley

Holmbridge is a small village on the A6024 about 1.5 miles (2.4 km) to the southwest of Holmfirth and about 8 miles (13 km) south of Huddersfield, in West Yorkshire, England. It is in the parish of Holme Valley and the metropolitan borough of Kirklees.

In the 1950s, it was a site in the Survey of English Dialects.

On 6 July 2014, Stage 2 of the 2014 Tour de France from York to Sheffield, passed through the village.

The village has one pub, the Pickled Pheasant, one church, the Parish Church of St David, and a Village / Parish Hall. The former Four Inns Walk started at St. David's Church.

Holmbridge Cricket Club, who play in the Huddersfield Cricket League, are one of the village's central features.
