= Brockholes railway station =

Railway station in West Yorkshire, England

Brockholes
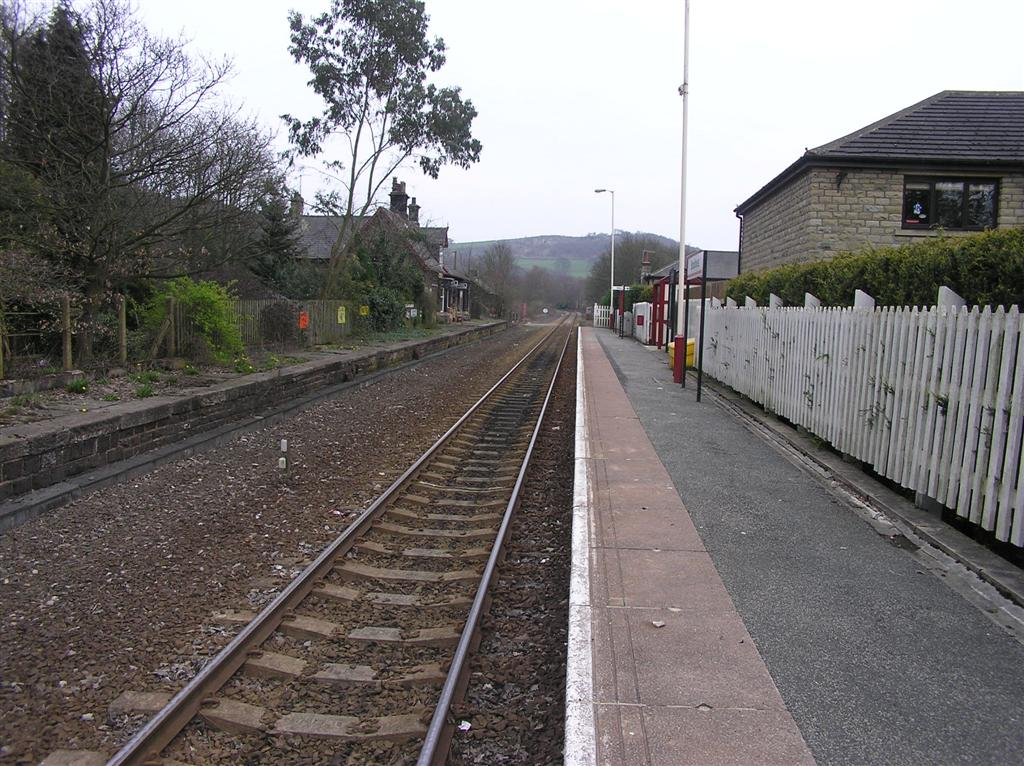

General information
- Location: Brockholes, Kirklees; England
- Coordinates: 53.5970°N 1.7698°W
- Grid reference: SE153111
- Manager: Northern Trains
- Transit authority: West Yorkshire (Metro)
- Platforms: 1

Other information
- Station code: BHS
- Fare zone: 5
- Classification: DfT category F2

History
- Opened: 1 July 1850; 176 years ago

Passengers
- 2021/22: ▲31,306
- 2022/23: ▲34,750
- 2023/24: ▲35,640
- 2024/25: ▲37,888
- 2025/26: ▲38,508
Location
Notes
- Passenger statistics from the Office of Rail and Road

Brockholes railway station serves the village of Brockholes, near Huddersfield in West Yorkshire. It lies 4.25 miles (7 km) away from Huddersfield on the Penistone Line operated by Northern Trains.

Trains passing between Brockholes and Shepley pass through a 1-mile (1.6 km) tunnel under Thurstonland.

Opened in July 1850 by the Huddersfield & Sheffield Junction Railway (a satellite company of the Lancashire & Yorkshire Railway), the station was formerly the junction for the Holmfirth Branch Line, which opened on the same day as the main line but closed to passenger trains on 2 November 1959 and to goods traffic in May 1965. Goods traffic ceased to be handled at Brockholes in October 1964, with the station becoming an unstaffed halt in August 1966.

The southbound platform went out of use when the Stocksmoor to Huddersfield section was singled in 1989. Only the northern end of the former Huddersfield-bound platform (which has been raised to modern standard height) is now used for rail services; the other end is disused and fenced off. The main buildings on the southbound side have been restored and converted into a private house, complete with heritage signage.

== Facilities ==
The station is unstaffed and has a basic shelter on its single active platform. A ticket machine was added in 2018, so tickets are now available to be bought at the station as well as on the train. Tickets can be bought in advance and collected from the station's machine. Timetable poster and a digital information screen are provided to offer train running information. Step-free access is via a ramp from the main entrance.

== Services ==
On Mondays to Saturdays, trains operate every hour in each direction, to Huddersfield and Sheffield via Barnsley. The same frequency applies on Sundays also, but starting later in the morning.

Preceding station	National Rail	Following station
Stocksmoor	Northern Trains Penistone Line	Honley
Disused railways
Terminus	L&YR Holmfirth Branch Line	Thongsbridge

== Image gallery ==
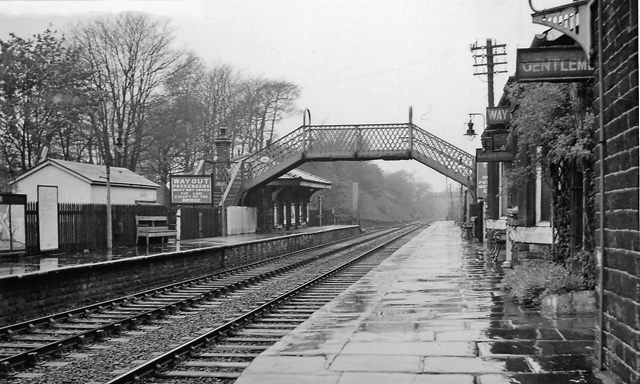
The station in 1961

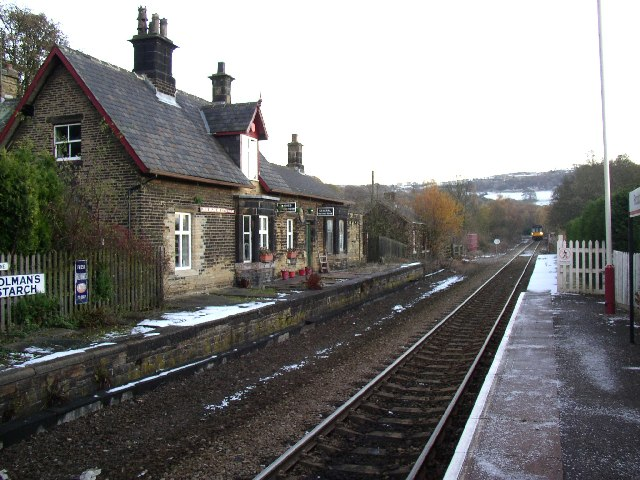
The station in 2005

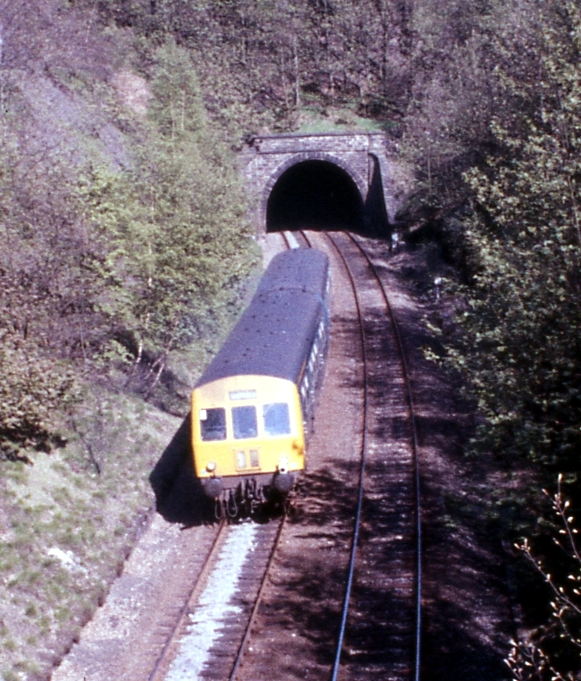
A train entering Thurstonland rail tunnel in the 1970s

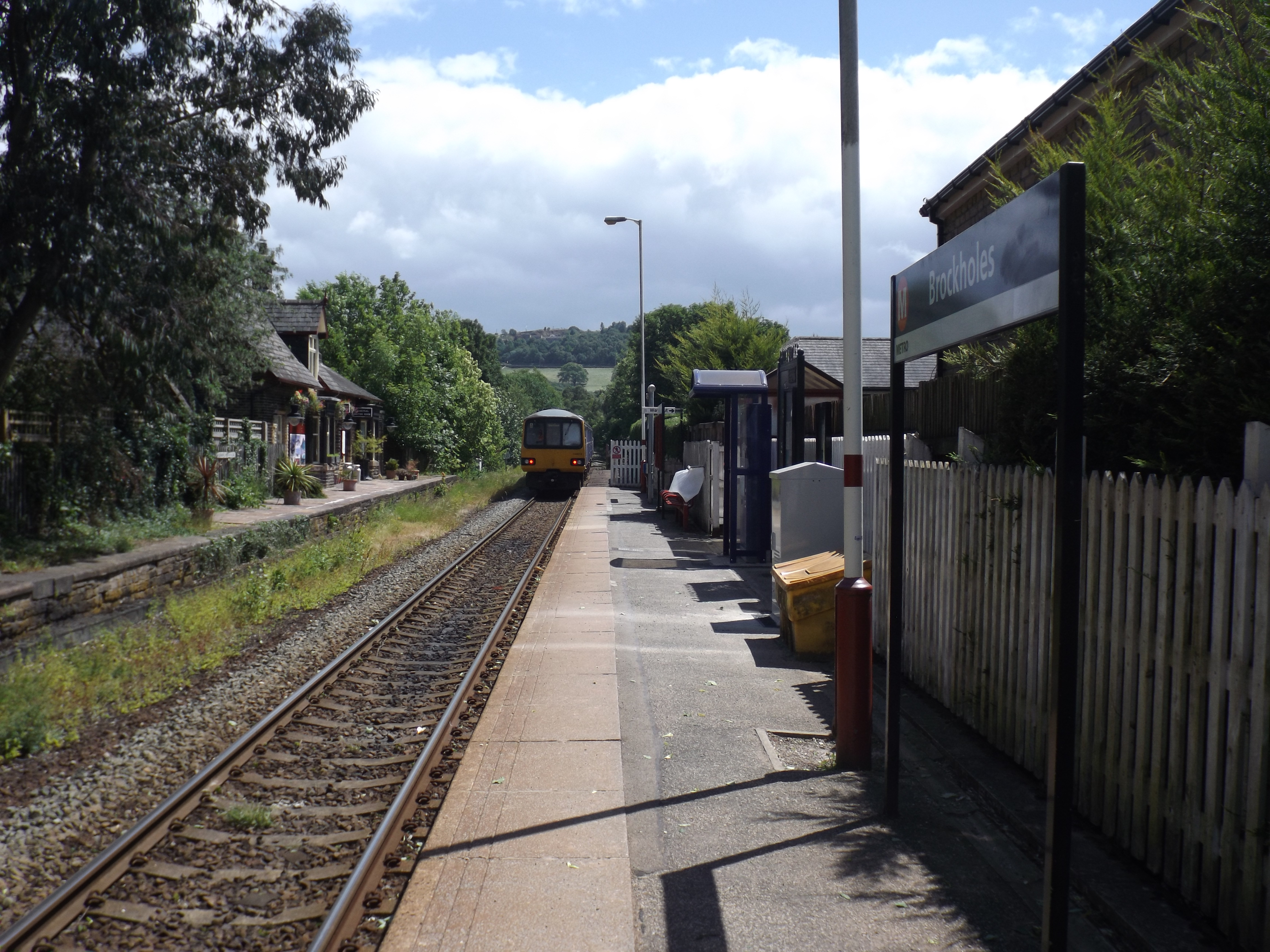
The station in 2018

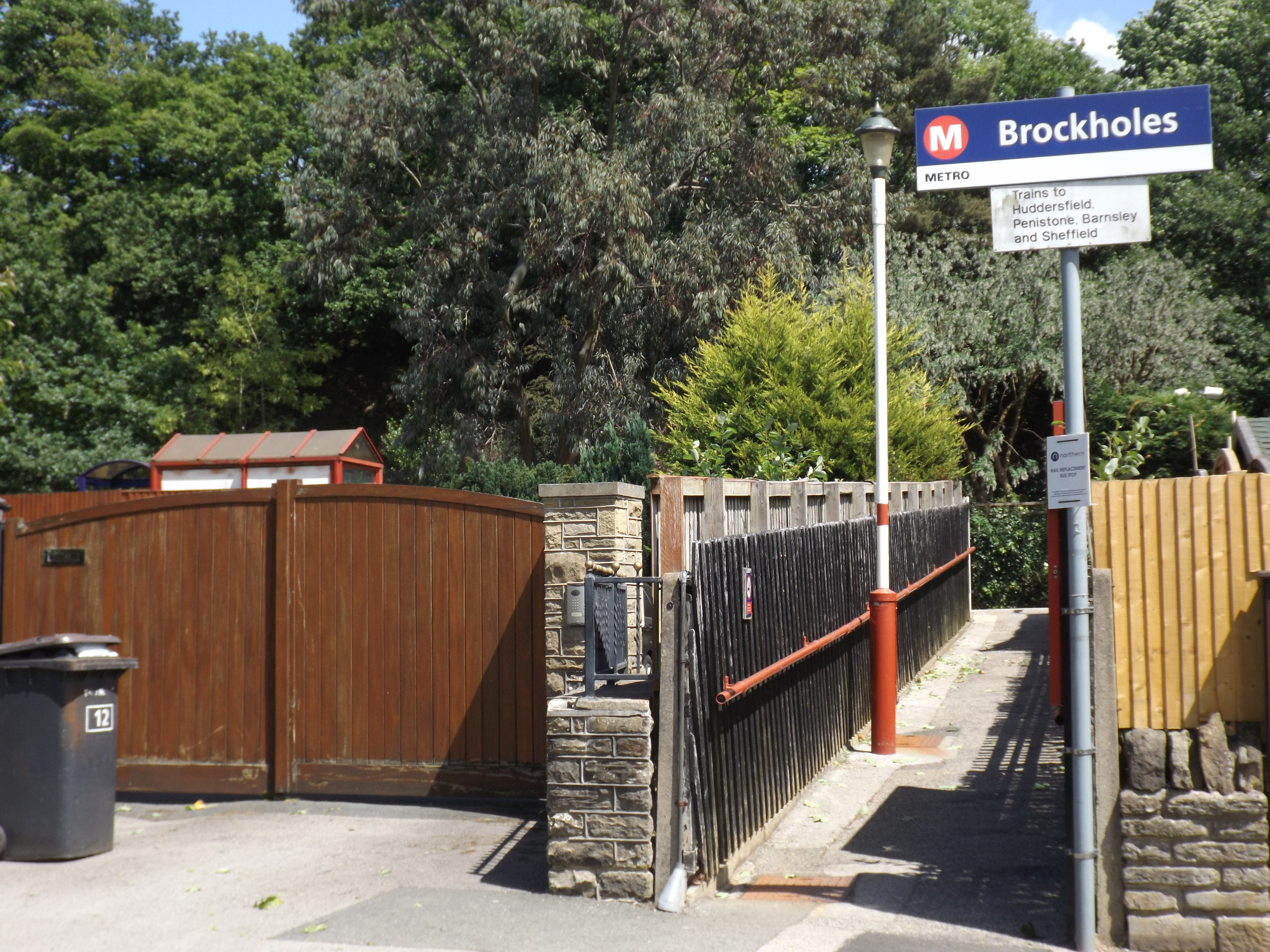
The sign at the entrance to the station in 2018
