= Brockholes =

Village in West Yorkshire, England

Coordinates: 53.5970°N 1.7698°W

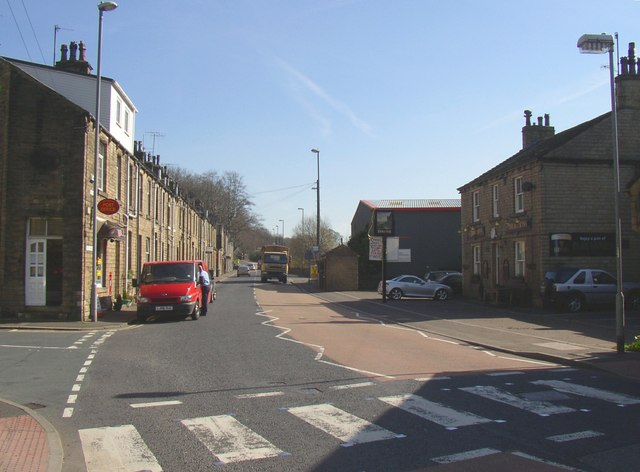
- New Mill Road, Brockholes

- Location within West Yorkshire
- Population: 1,861
- OS grid reference: SE153111
  - London: 160 mi (260 km) SSE
- Metropolitan borough: Kirklees
- Metropolitan county: West Yorkshire
- Region: Yorkshire and the Humber
- Country: England
- Sovereign state: United Kingdom
- Post town: Holmfirth
- Postcode district: HD9
- Dialling code: 01484
- Police: West Yorkshire
- Fire: West Yorkshire
- Ambulance: Yorkshire
- UK Parliament: Colne Valley

Brockholes is a small village in West Yorkshire, England, in the administrative area of Kirklees Metropolitan Council and Holme Valley Parish Council. The village of Honley borders to the immediate north of the village and Holmfirth lies to the south. Brockholes is within the Postal district of Holmfirth.

== Community ==
According to the 2001 census, Brockholes had a resident population of 1,861 in 764 households.

Central to the village is a small green set back from the A616 behind terraced housing, and overlooked by a church, a chapel and the village hall, formerly the village school. The village hall on Brockholes Lane was built in 1837 and is a Grade II listed building. Further Grade II structures are the Gothic Revival St George's Church of England parish church, built in 1861, the 17th- or early 18th-century Bank End farmhouse and barn on Bank End Knoll at the south-east of the village, and a late 18th- to early 19th-century single-span bridge over the River Holme on Smithy Place Lane.

A more modern primary school, Brockholes C of E Junior and Infants School for 4 to 11 year olds, is on Brockholes Lane, 200 yards (183 m) south from the village Railway station. The station has a direct link between Huddersfield and Sheffield on the Penistone Line.

Brockholes contains two public houses, The Rock Inn and the Travellers Rest and a range of village shops. The Post Office is open for one hour a week.

The A616 route between Huddersfield and Penistone passes directly through the village and the A6024 Woodhead Road passes down the valley on its westward side.

== Economy ==
Brockholes is a semi-rural area, mostly consisting of farms with a large housing area, some of which has been built on the former premises of Rock Mills, which was only one of several large textile mills. There was also a spinning works, shoddy mill, and a textile machinery engineering works, though now only the latter still exists. A number of larger businesses were established in the industrial units of the old Rock Mill site, including a tyre fitting and repair company, an electrical wholesalers, a steel fabrication company, and a car registration plate business. More recently the local petrol station was bought out by a national chain and refurbished to include a mini supermarket.

Brook (Electric) Motors, founded in 1904 by Ernest Brook by its 50th anniversary in 1954 it employed more than 2,000 people and, with Ernest's sons Frank and Jack in charge, was the largest exclusive producer of AC motors in the world, and had a turnover of £4,500,000. By 1954 Brook Motors Ltd operated 10 factories in Huddersfield, its biggest being Empress Works on St Thomas's Road, and had just opened one at Barugh Green, Barnsley along with their site in Honley which sits firmly between the road to Holmfirth and the road to Brockholes. Brook Motors was one of the more enlightened employers in Huddersfield. Ernest Brook himself installed a profit-sharing scheme, and to mark the 1954 jubilee celebrations a gratuity, or independent pension, scheme was introduced. Management insisted on clean, well-lit, hygienic premises with the most up-to-date machinery.

At its height, Brook Motors was producing more than 70% of the world's electric motors. It went through numerous mergers, though the name still survives in the 2010 company, Invensys Brook Crompton.

Production ceased in Huddersfield in 2000 and was moved to Poland.

The Honley factory has now closed and the buildings have been divided into smaller units. Other former businesses include Ben Shaws, a soft drinks manufacturers, the old K&M Candle factory, taken over by shoe polish manufacturer Kiwi, and eventually closed, and Norton Scientific Instruments.

== Gallery ==
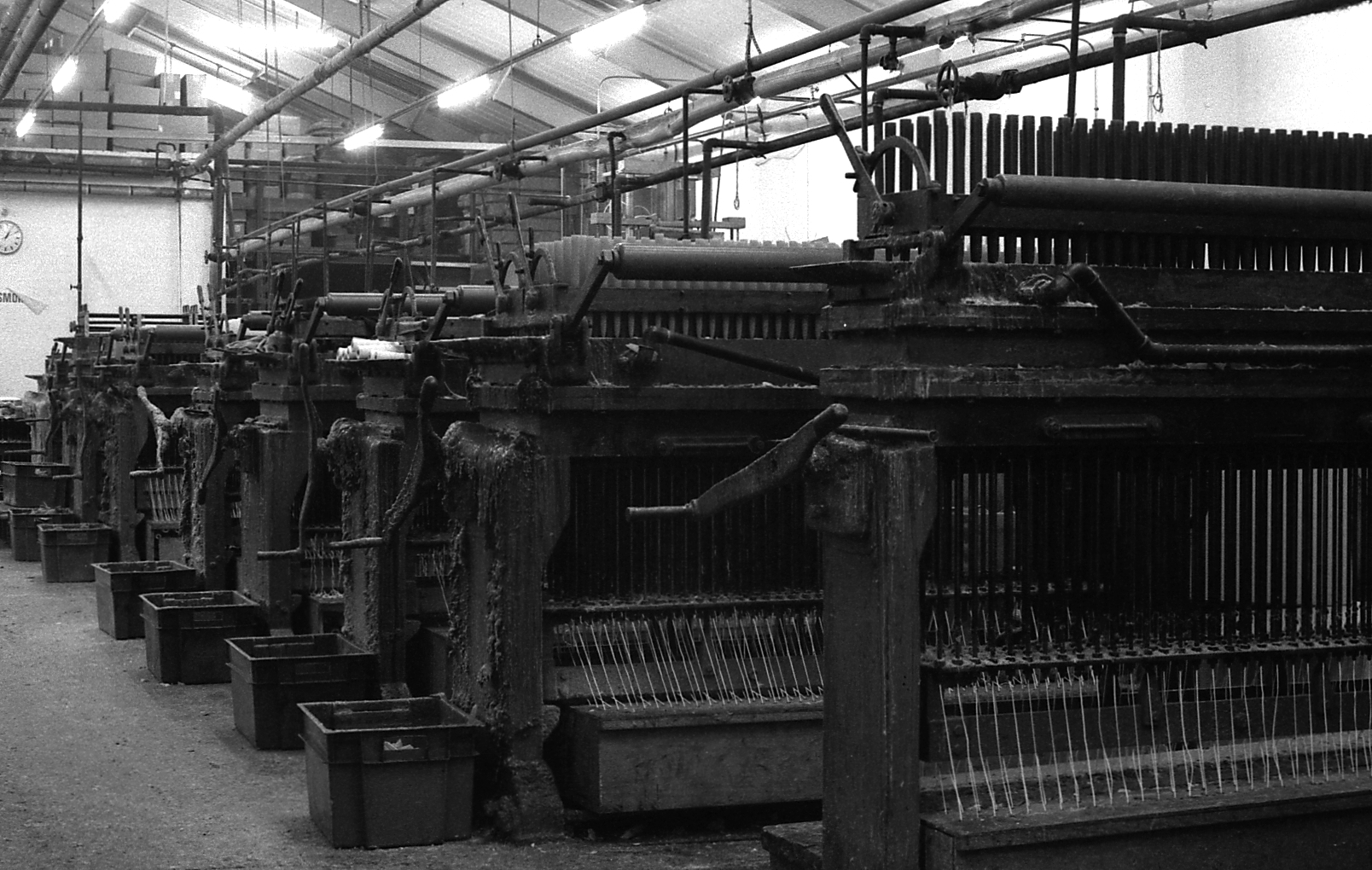
K&M Candles Hand operated Candle Making Machine 1972

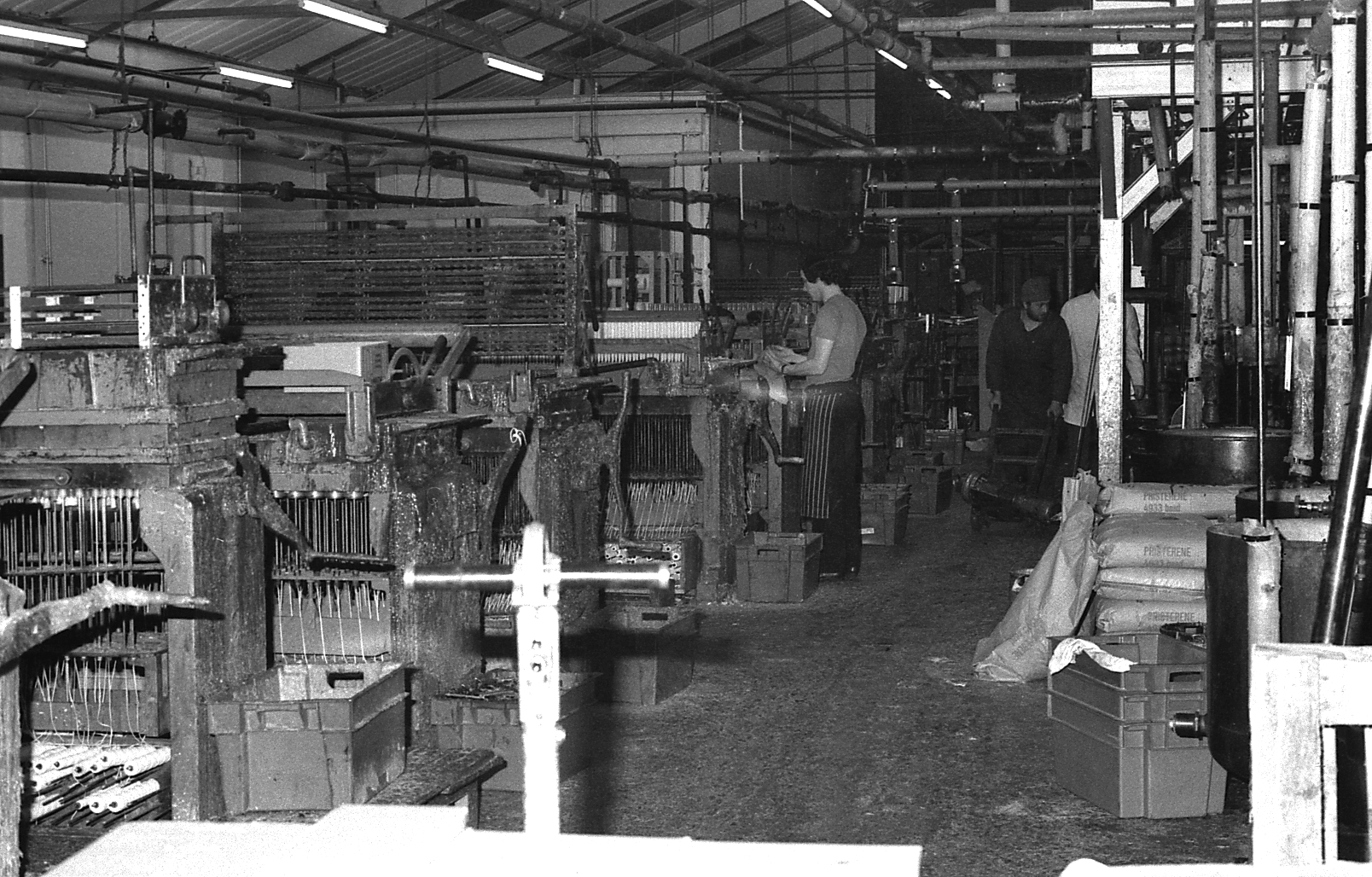
K&M Candles Hand operated Candle Making Machine 1972

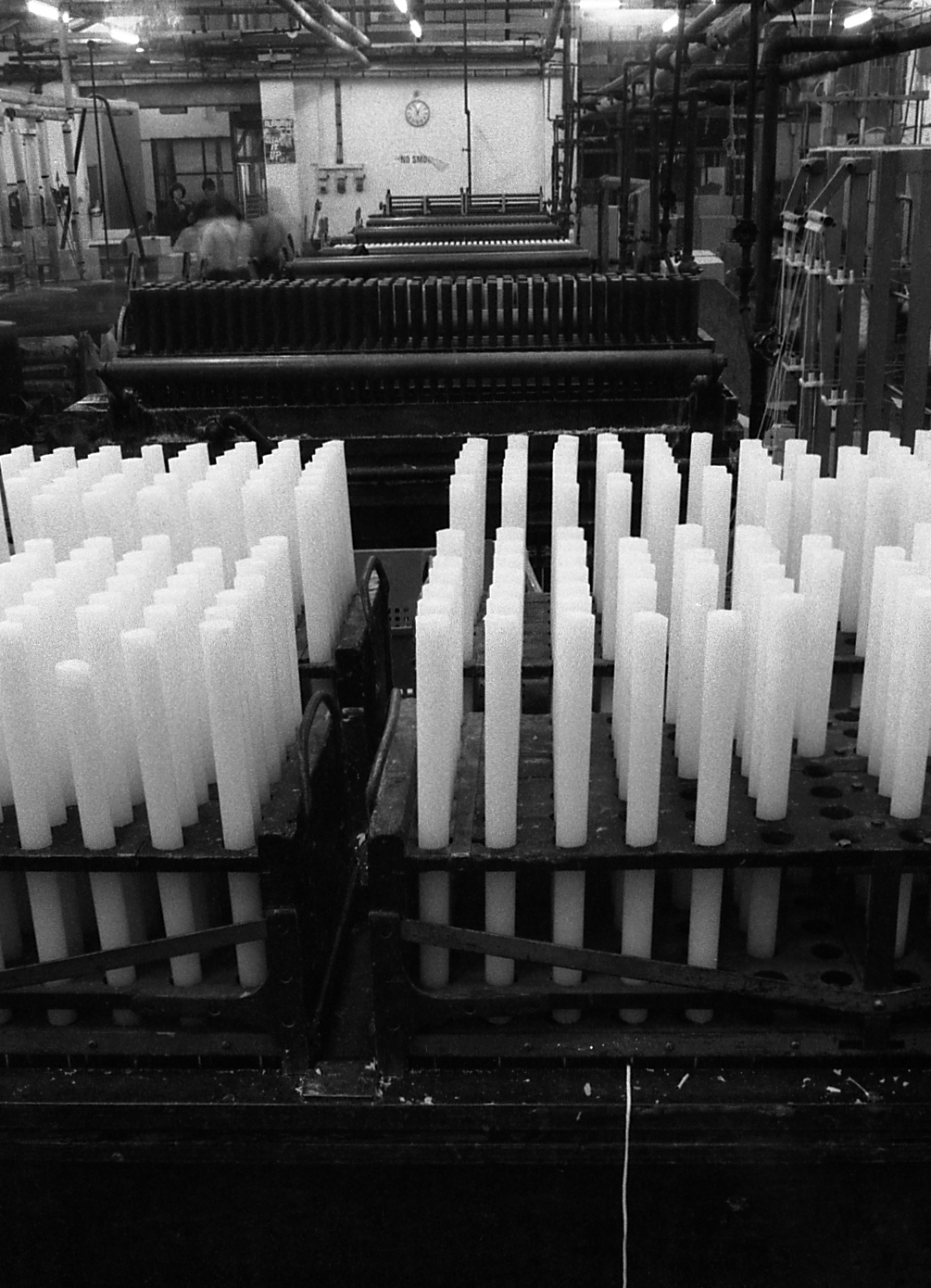
K&M Candles Hand operated Candle Making Machine 1972

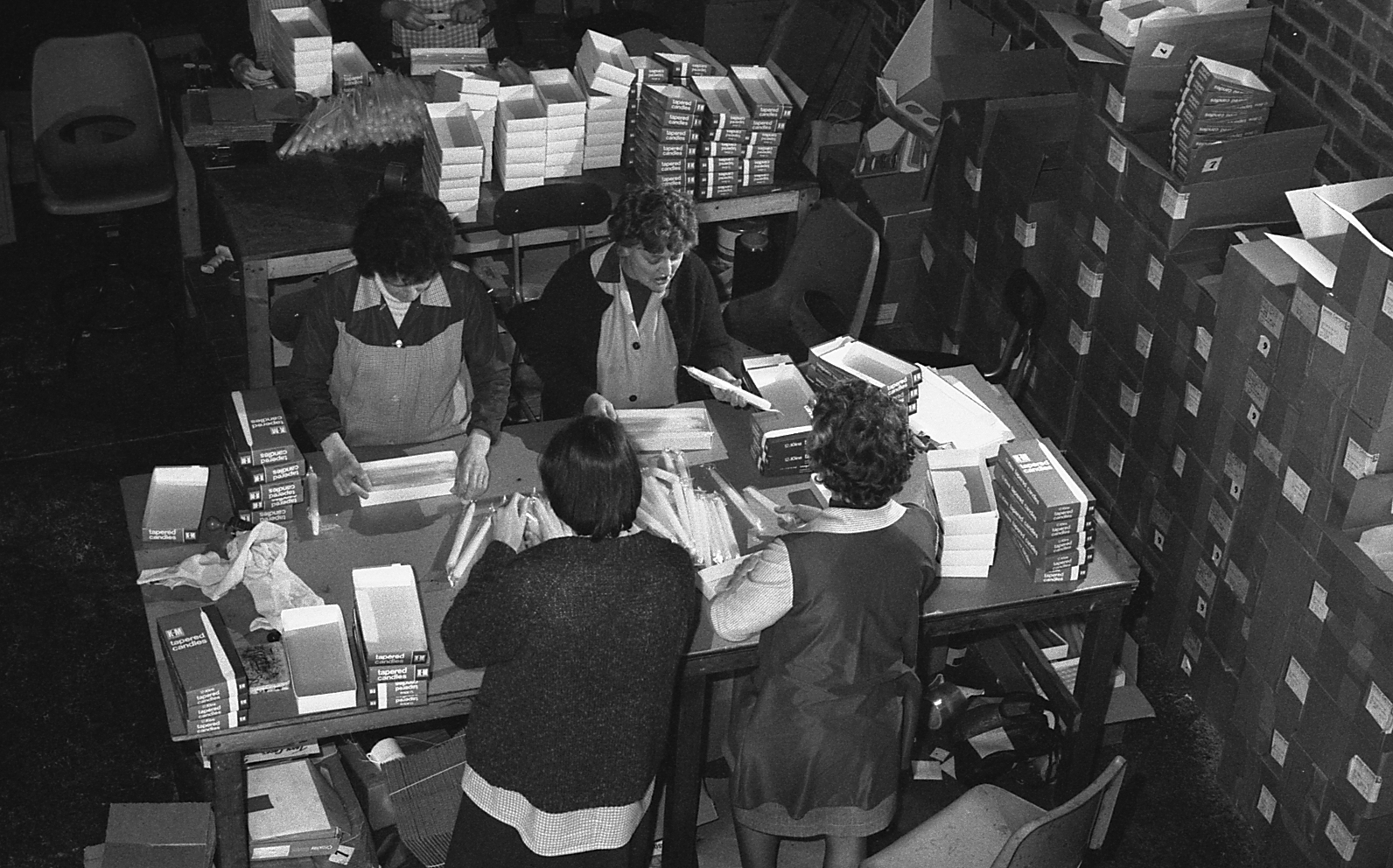
K&M Staff packing candles into boxes 1972

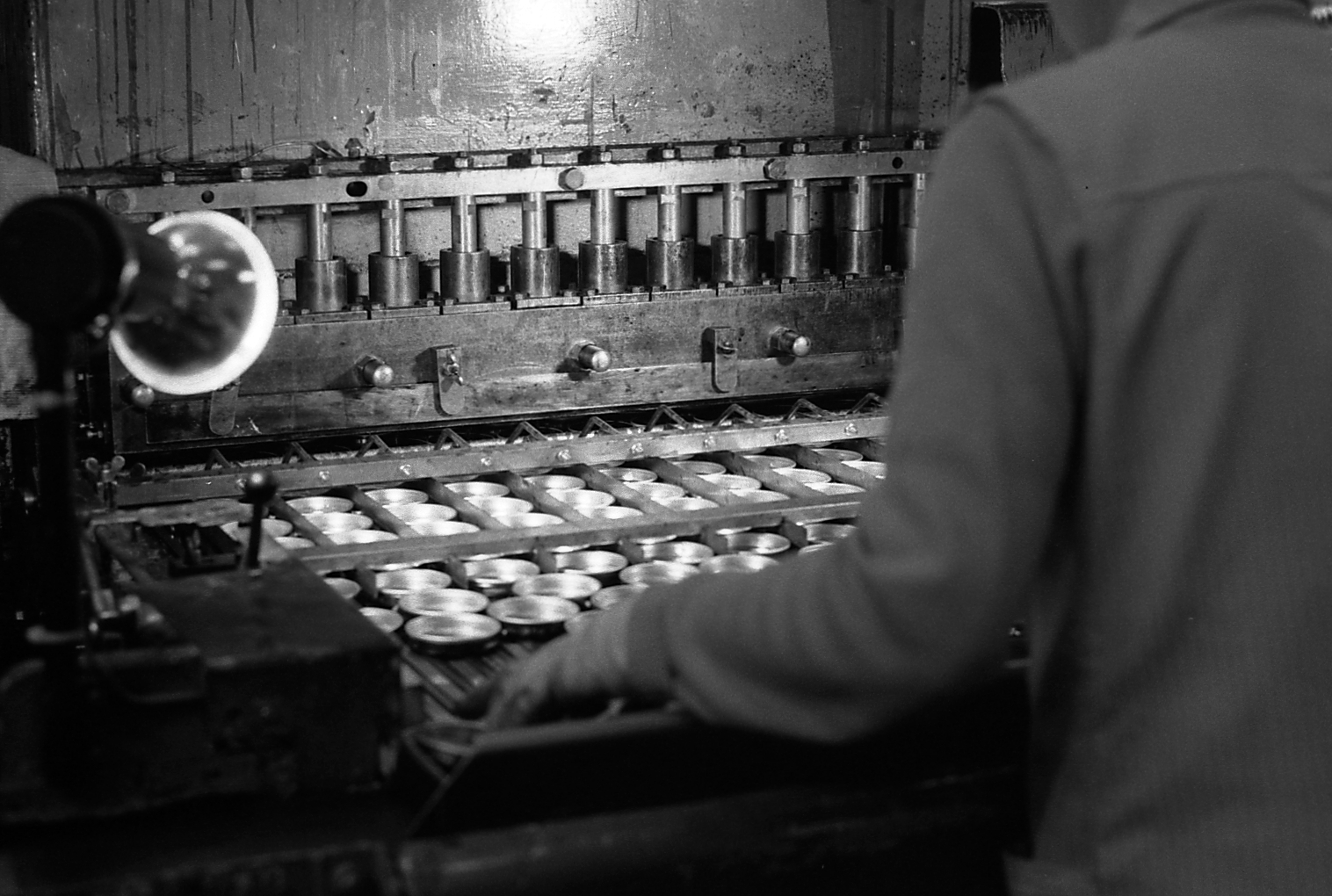
K&M Kiwi Shoe Polish canning machine empty tins being loaded 1972

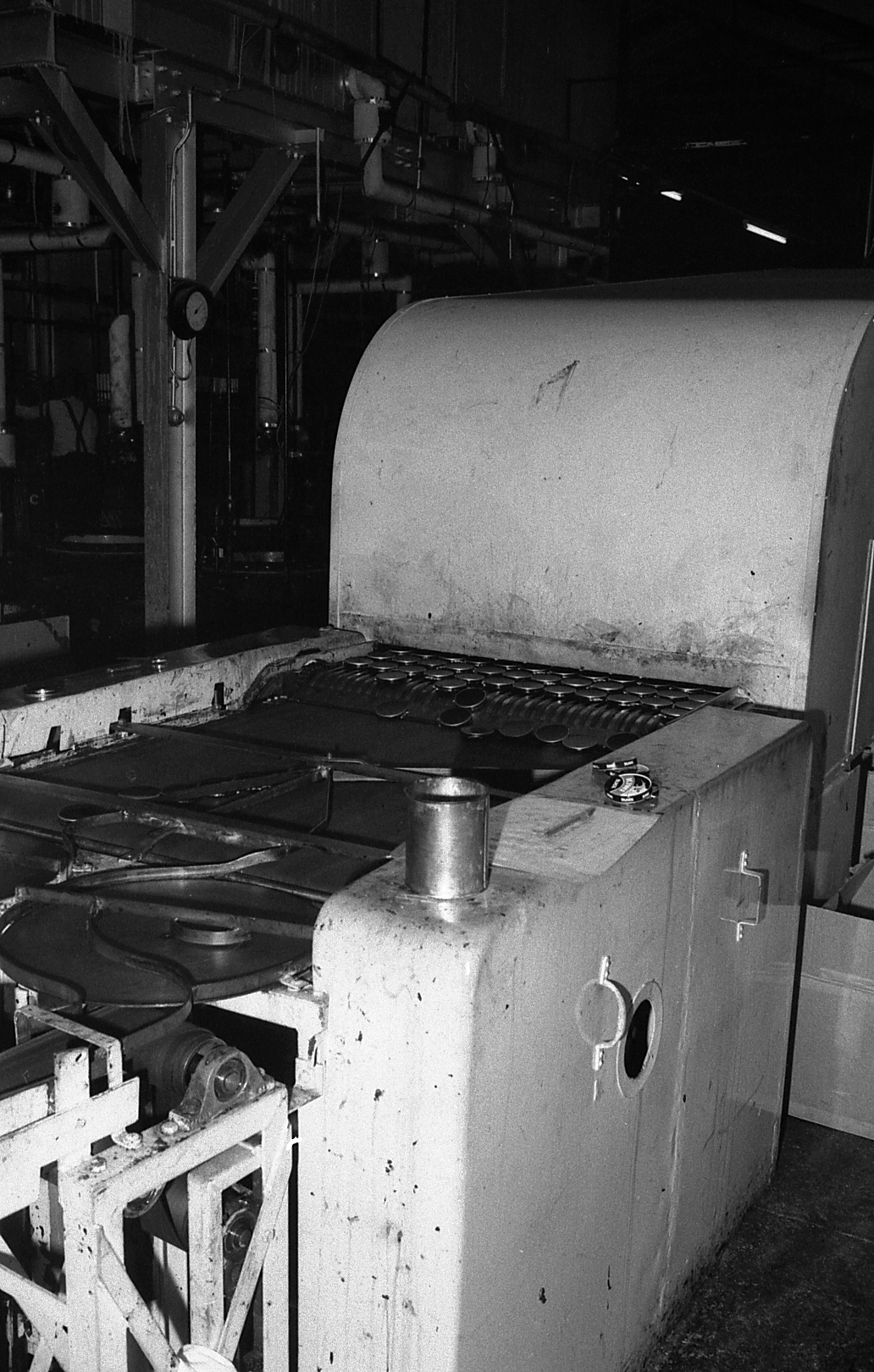
K&M Kiwi Shoe Polish canning machine, full tins from machine 1972

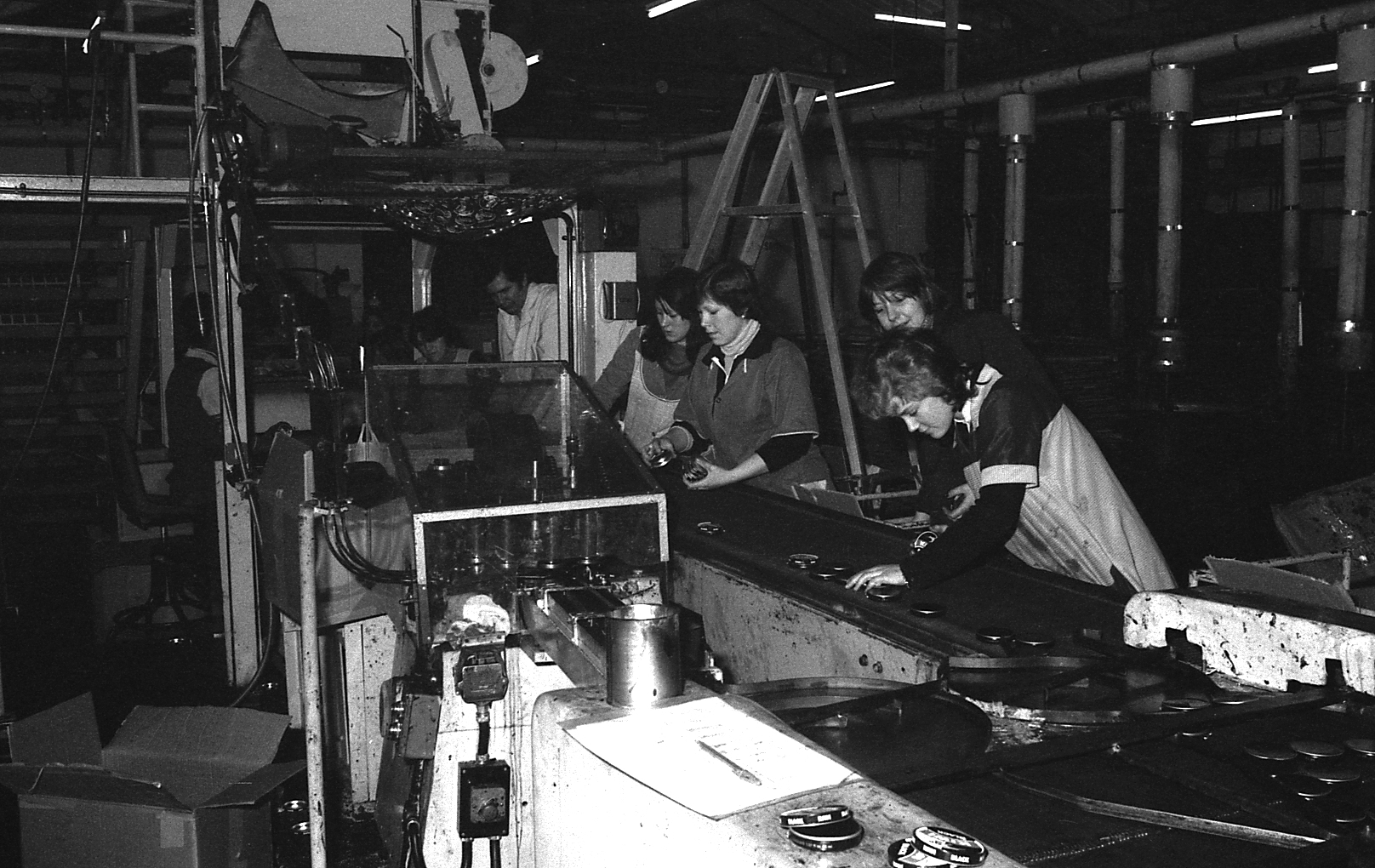
K&M, KIWI Shoe Polish production Line, putting lids on tins by hand 1972

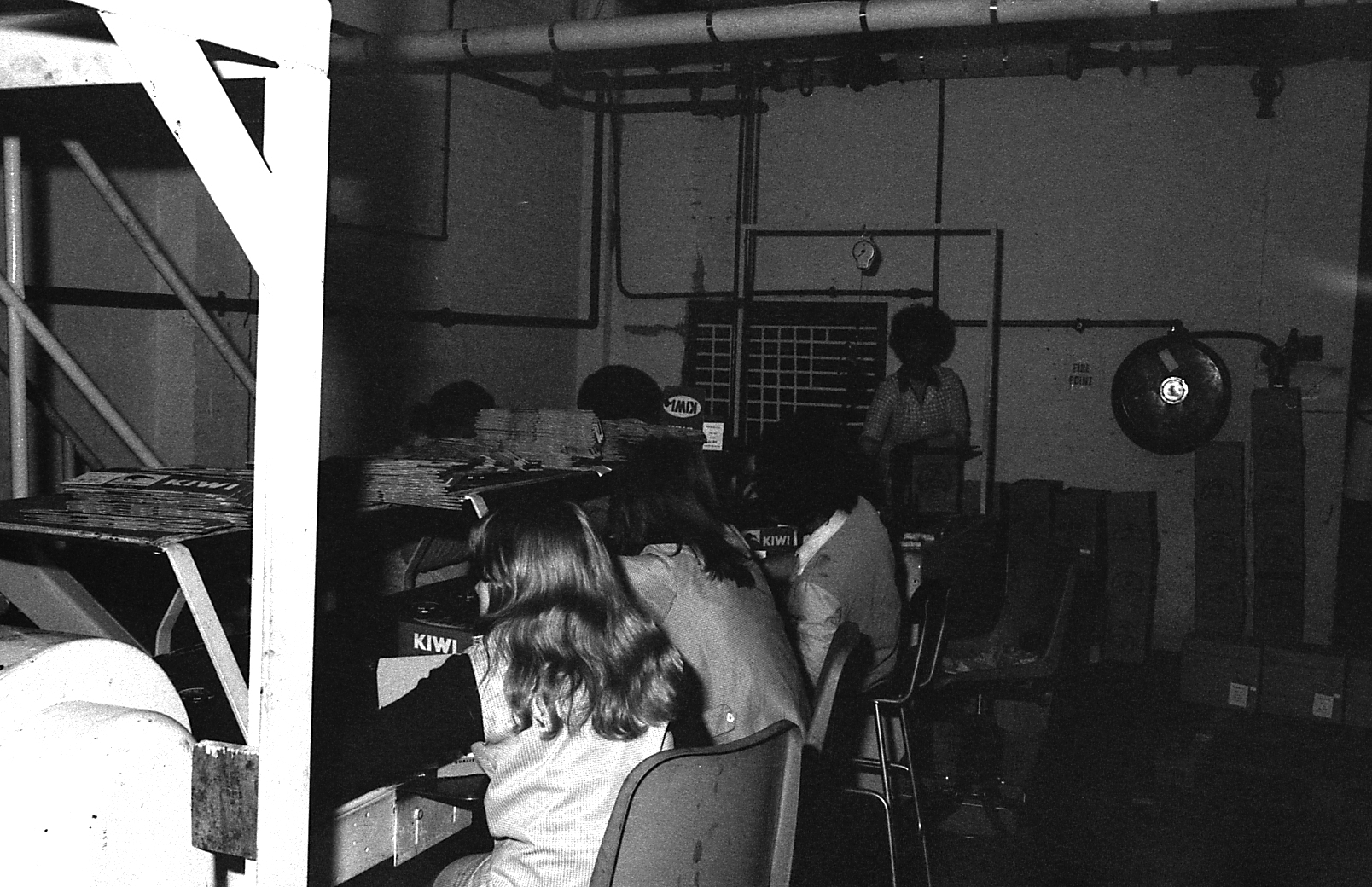
K&M Staff packing KIWI Shoe Polish into boxes 1972

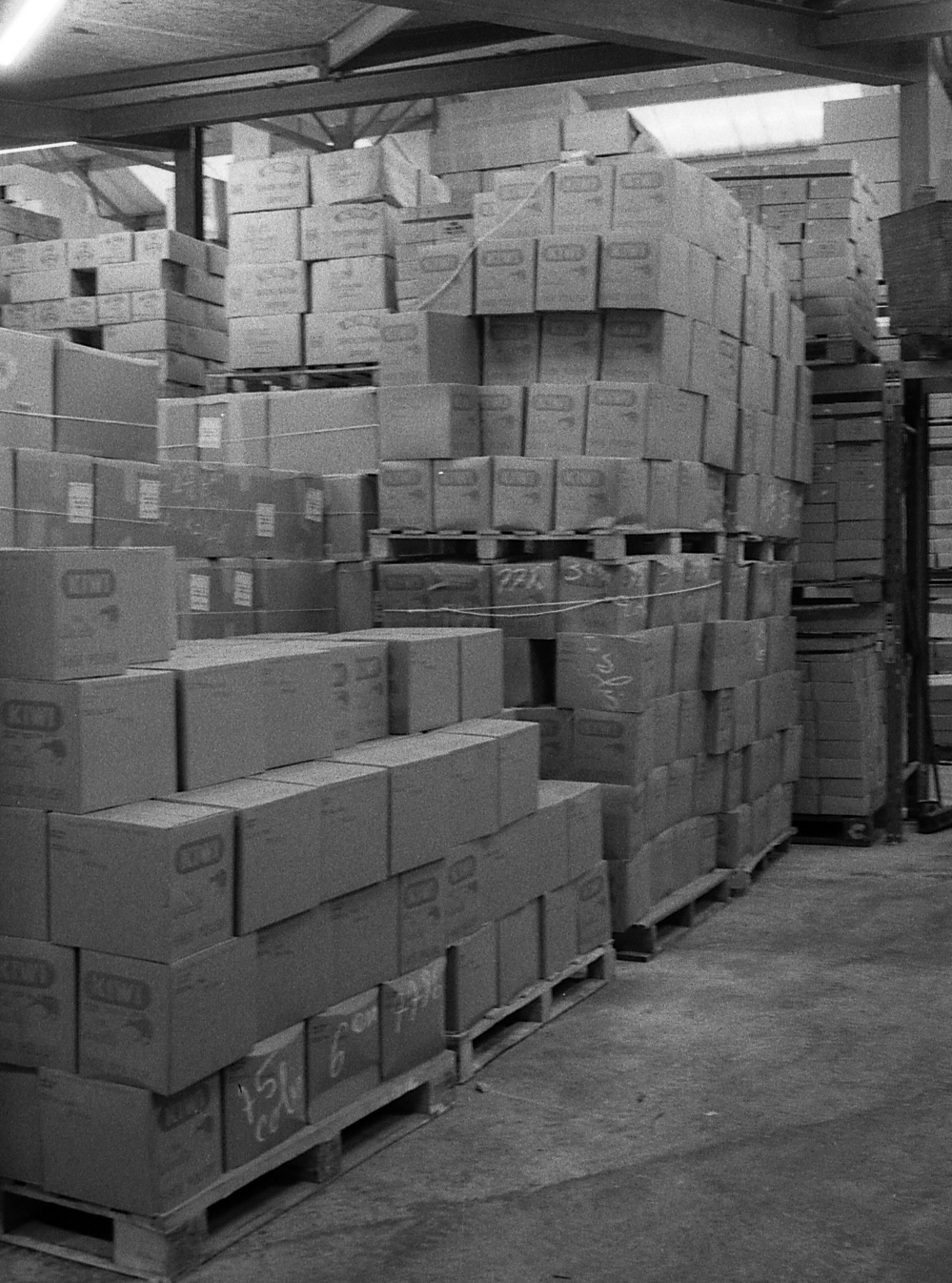
K&M, KIWI Shoe Polish boxes Warehouse Storage 1972

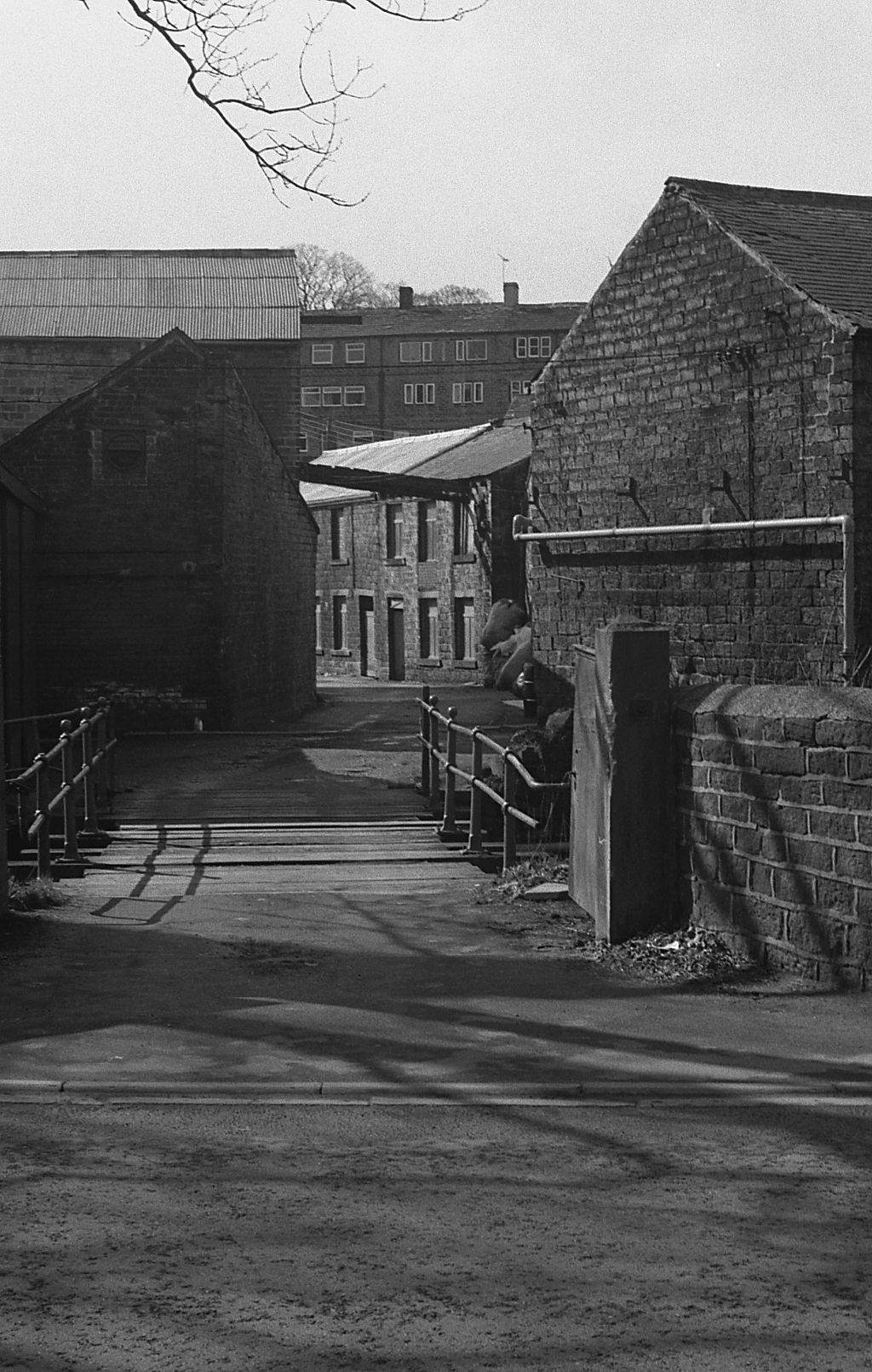
Entry To Smithy Place Shoddy Mill in 1978
