= Scholes =

Scholes (the sch is pronounced sh or sk) may refer to:

== United Kingdom ==
- Scholes, in St Helens, Merseyside.
- Scholes, Greater Manchester, in Wigan
- Scholes, South Yorkshire in the Rotherham borough
- Scholes, Cleckheaton, Kirklees, West Yorkshire
- Scholes, Holme Valley, Kirklees, West Yorkshire
- Scholes, Leeds, West Yorkshire
  - Barwick in Elmet and Scholes, a civil parish
- Scholes, Bradford, a hamlet near Oakworth, West Yorkshire
- Scholes Coppice, an area of ancient woodland located, Rotherham, South Yorkshire

== United States ==
- Scholes International Airport at Galveston, Texas
- Scholes Library, Alfred University, New York

== People ==
- Arthur Scholes (1890–1953), Canadian long-distance runner
- Clarke Scholes (1930–2010), American competition swimmer and Olympic champion
- Dennis Scholes (1928–2016), British rugby league footballer
- France Vinton Scholes (1897–1979), American scholar and historian
- George Scholes (1928–2004), Canadian ice hockey player, competed in the 1956 Winter Olympics
- Gordon Scholes AO (1931–2018), former Australian politician and Speaker of the Australian House of Representatives
- Jack Scholes (1917–1989), New Zealand sailor
- James Christopher Scholes (1852–1890), English antiquary
- John M. Scholes (1948–2019), computer scientist and APL implementer and programmer
- John Scholes (cricketer) (1950–2003), Australian cricketer
- Katherine Scholes (born 1959), Australian writer
- Ken Scholes (born 1968), American science fiction and fantasy writer
- Malcolm Scholes (1924–2008), British Royal Air Force (RAF) pilot in World War II
- Mark Scholes (born 1957), Australian cricket player
- Myron Scholes (born 1941), Canadian, Nobel Prize–winning economist and creator of the Black-Scholes model
  - Black–Scholes, a mathematical formula used in economics
- Paul Scholes (born 1974), English footballer
- Percy Scholes (1877–1958), English musician and journalist
- Robert Scholes (1929–2016), American literary critic and theorist
- Robert Scholes (politician) (1866–1929), American politician
- Roger Scholes (1950–2022), Australian independent film and television maker since 1983
- Rory Scholes (born 1993), Irish rugby union player
- Theophilus Scholes (1858–1940), Baptist missionary, medical doctor and political commentator
- Wayne Scholes, British businessman, CEO of Red Touch Media
- William L. Scholes (1926–2002), American politician

== See also ==
- Scoles and Schoales, surnames
- Sholes (disambiguation)
- Scales (surname)
- Coles (disambiguation)
