= West Yorkshire Built-up Area =

Coordinates: 53°43′N 1°38′W

- Conurbation
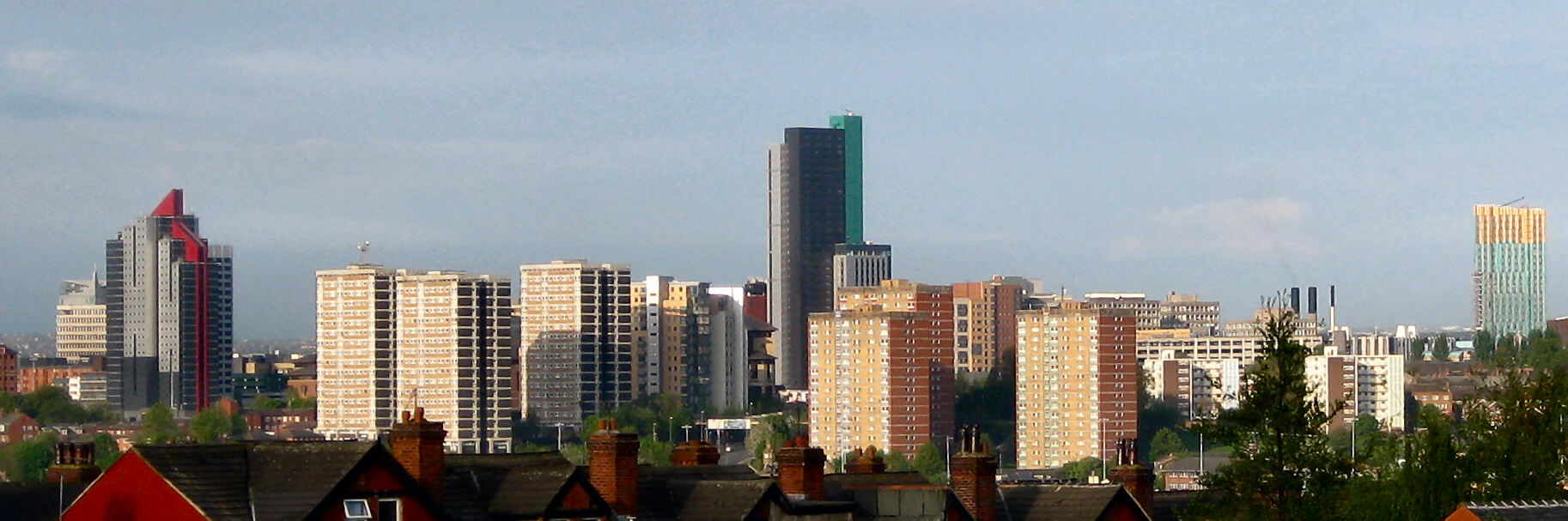
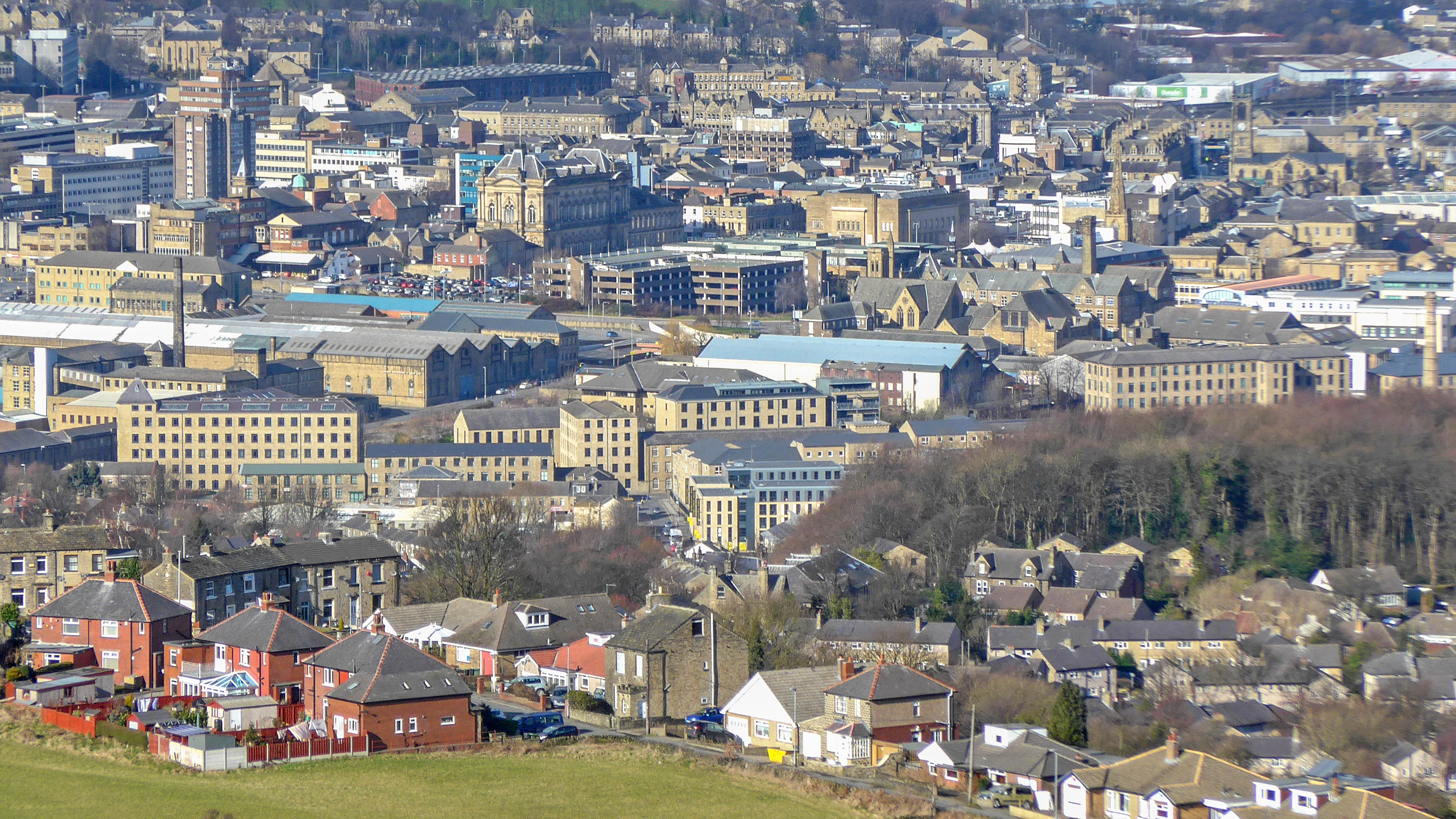
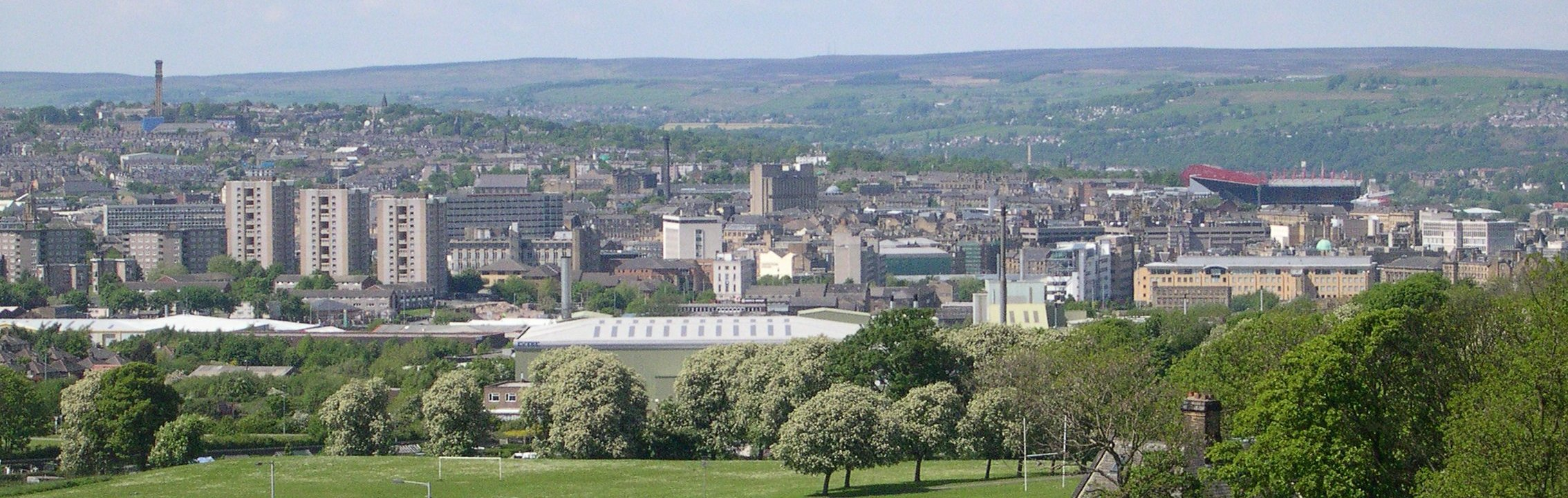
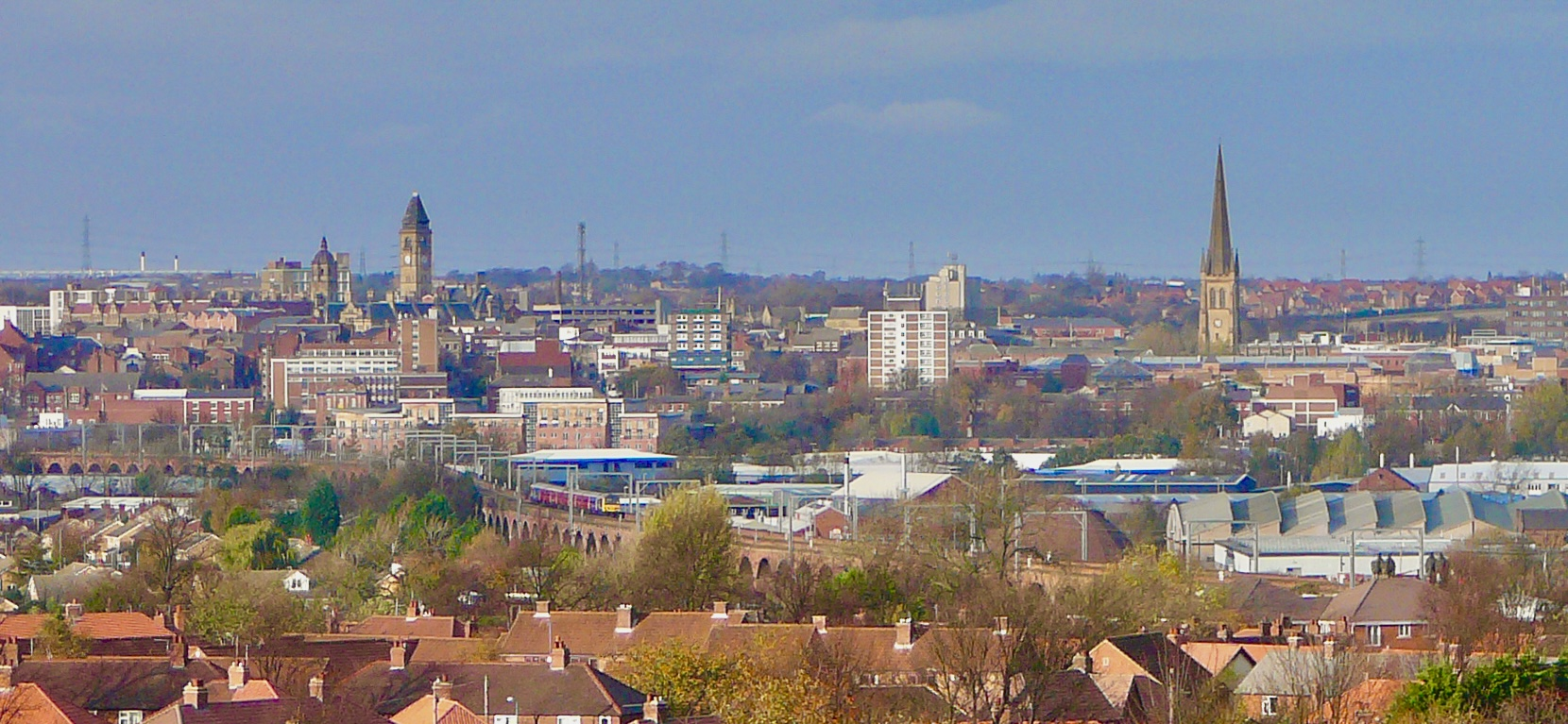
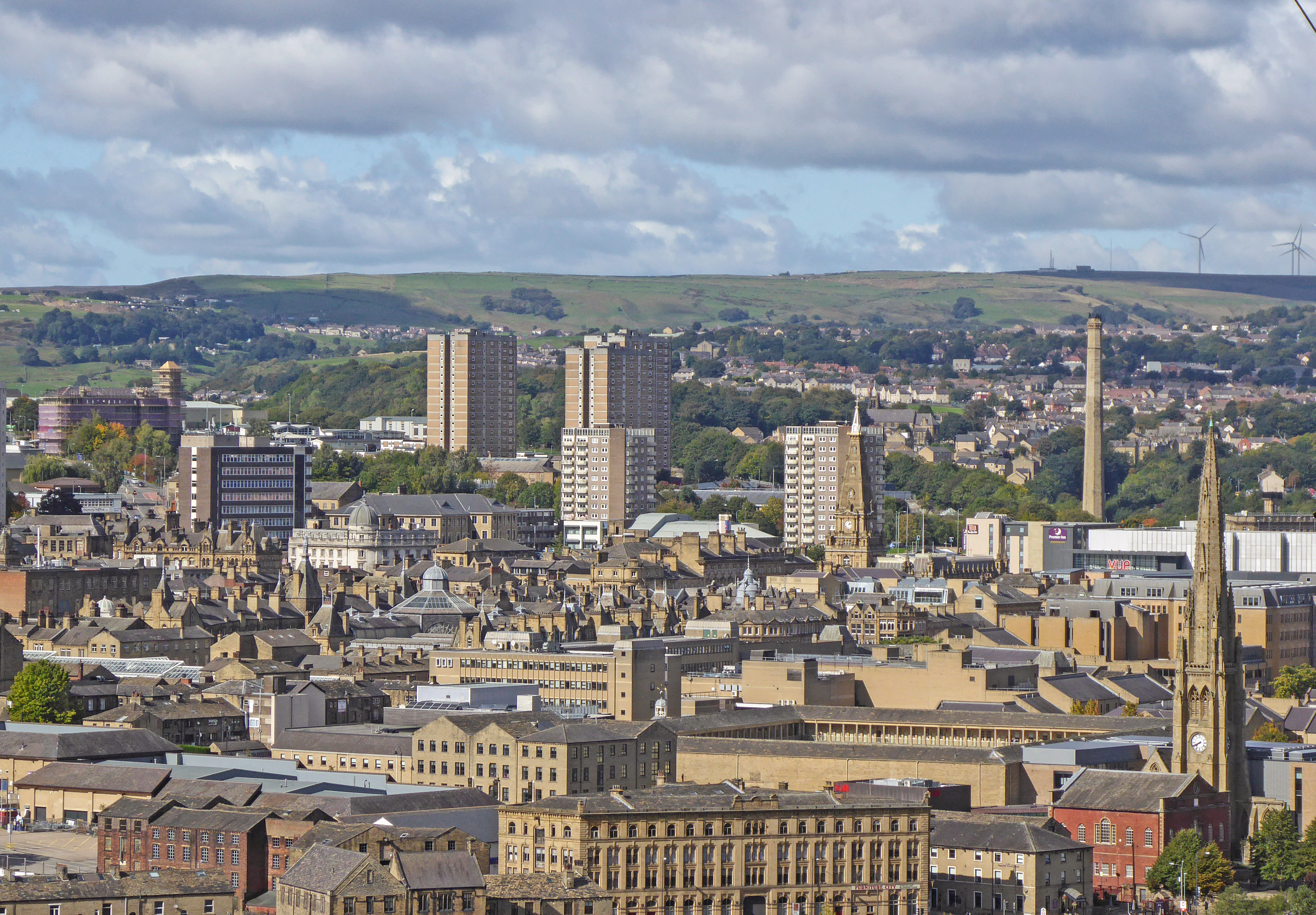
- Leeds Huddersfield Bradford Wakefield Halifax

- 2011 map of the West Yorkshire Built-up Area, showing subdivisions
- Area: 487.8 km^{2} (188.3 sq mi)
- Population: 1,777,934
  - Density: 3,645/km^{2} (9,440/sq mi)
- OS grid reference: SE455215
- Metropolitan county: West Yorkshire
- Region: Yorkshire and the Humber
- Country: England
- Sovereign state: United Kingdom
- Police: West Yorkshire
- Fire: West Yorkshire
- Ambulance: Yorkshire

The West Yorkshire Built-up Area, previously known as the West Yorkshire Urban Area, is a term used by the Office for National Statistics (ONS) to refer to a conurbation in West Yorkshire, England, based on the cities of Leeds, Bradford and Wakefield, and the large towns of Huddersfield and Halifax. It is the fourth largest urban area in the United Kingdom. However, it excludes other towns and villages such as Featherstone, Normanton, Castleford, Pontefract, Hemsworth, Todmorden, Hebden Bridge, Knottingley, Wetherby and Garforth which, though part of the county of West Yorkshire, are considered independently. There are substantial areas of agricultural land within the designated area – more than in any other official urban area in England – many of the towns and cities are only just connected by narrow outlying strips of development.

== Urban subdivisions ==
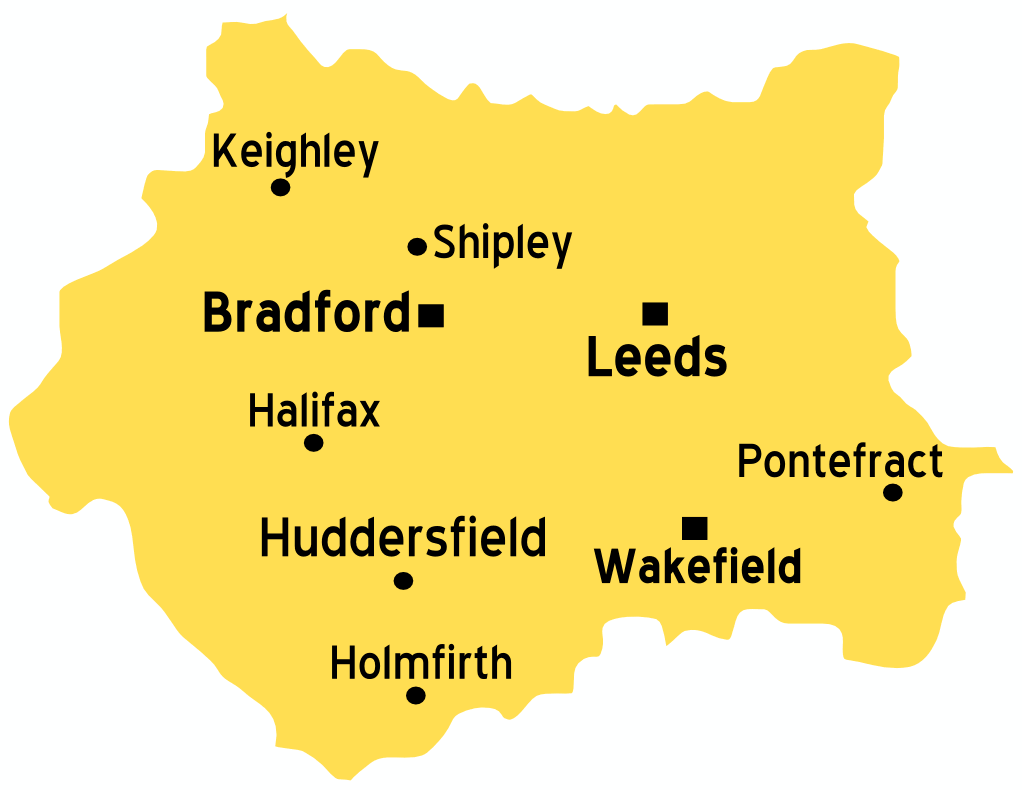
Map of the main settlements

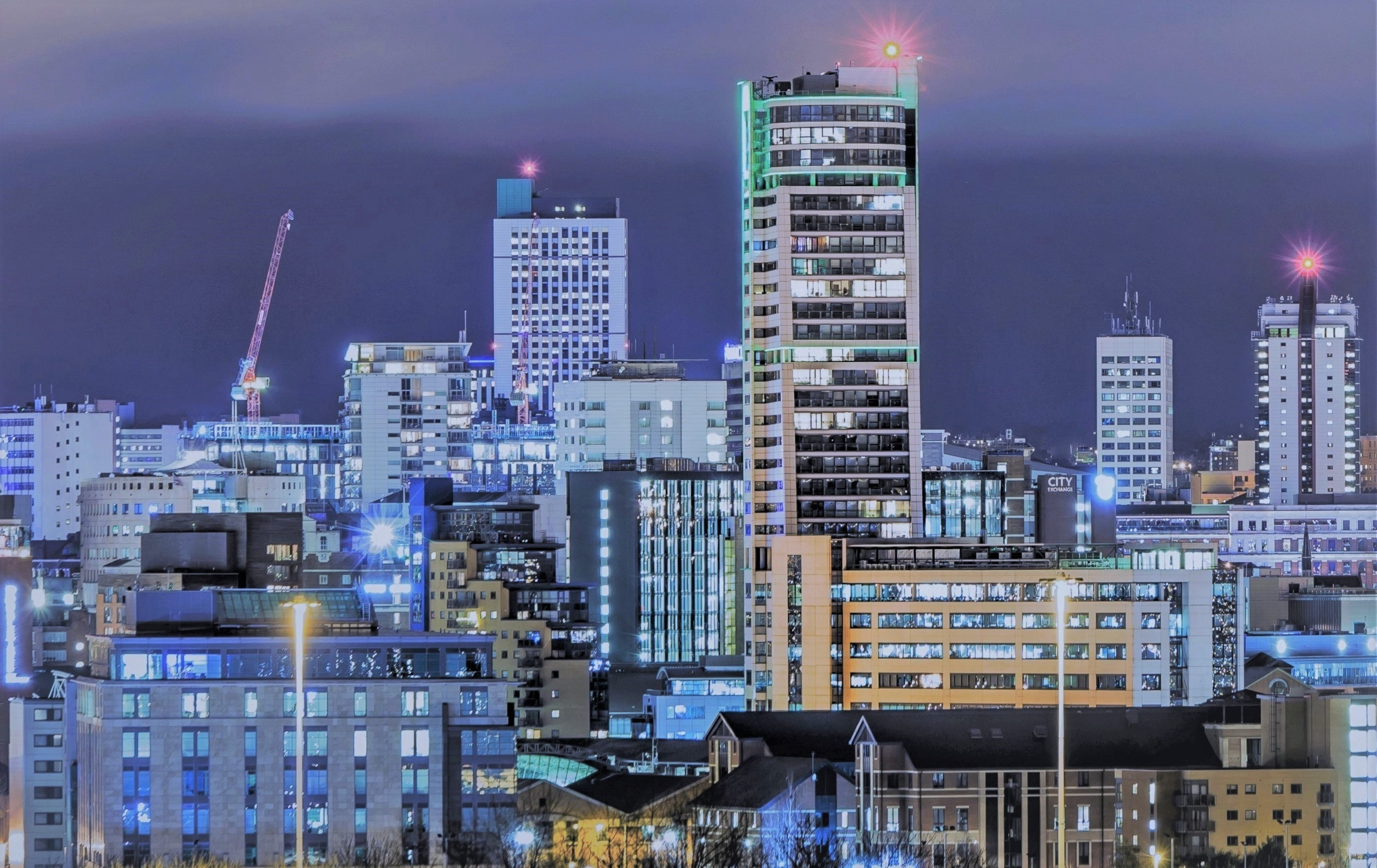
Leeds, the largest city in the built-up area (BUA) and the United Kingdom's third-largest city by population

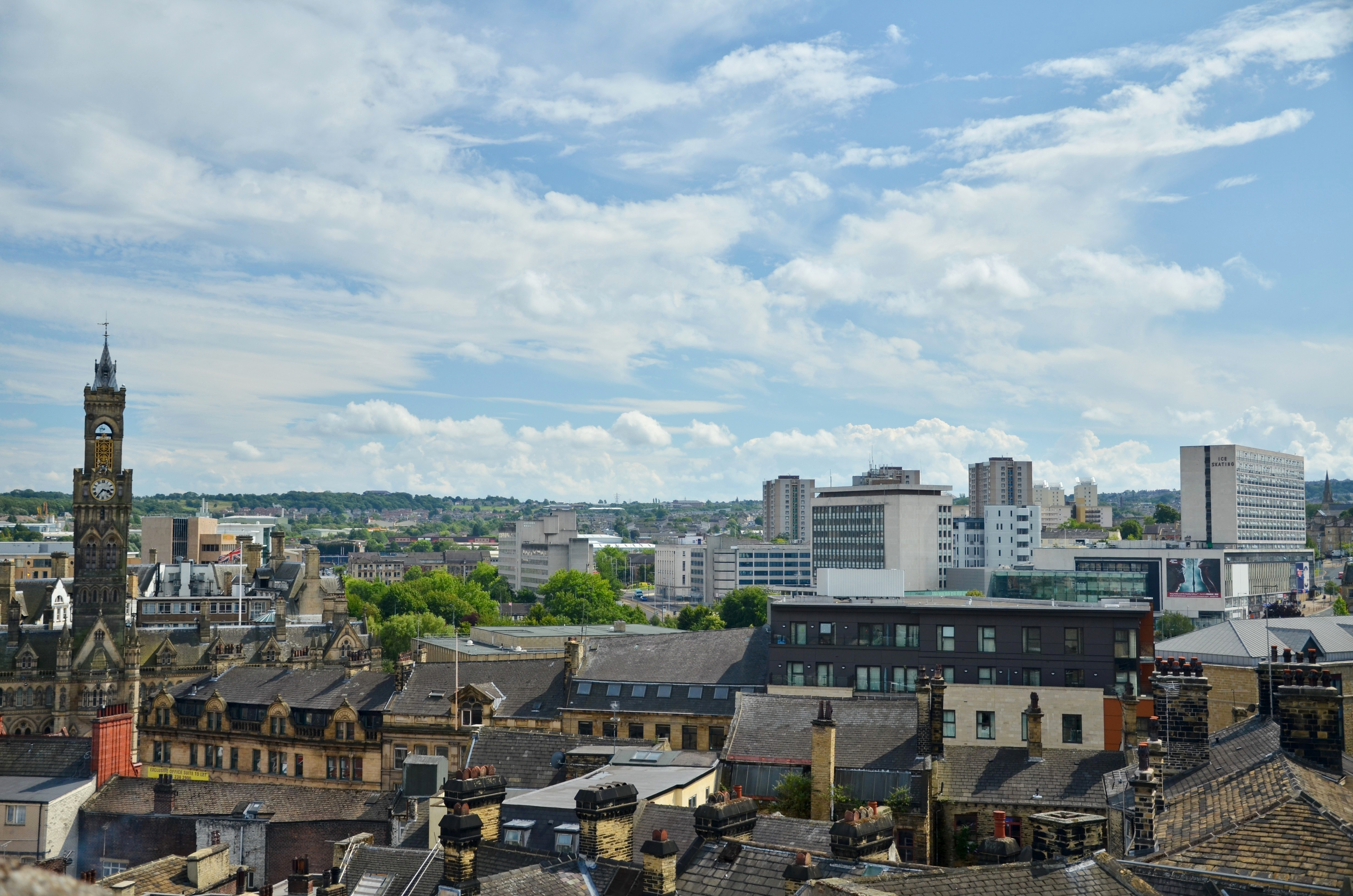
Bradford, the second largest city in the BUA and United Kingdom's sixth largest city by population

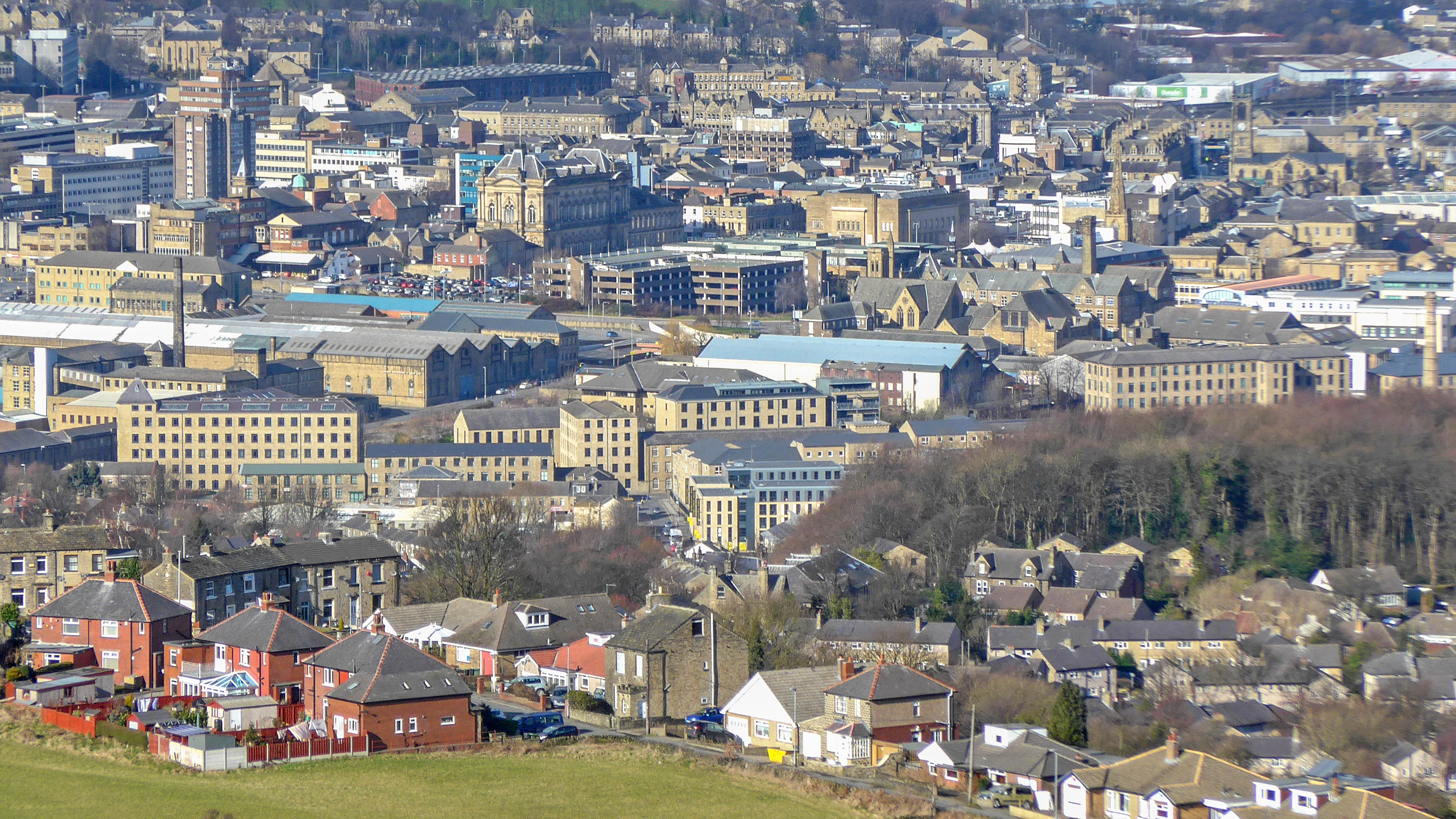
Huddersfield, a market town with the third-highest population in the BUA and one of the largest market towns in UK

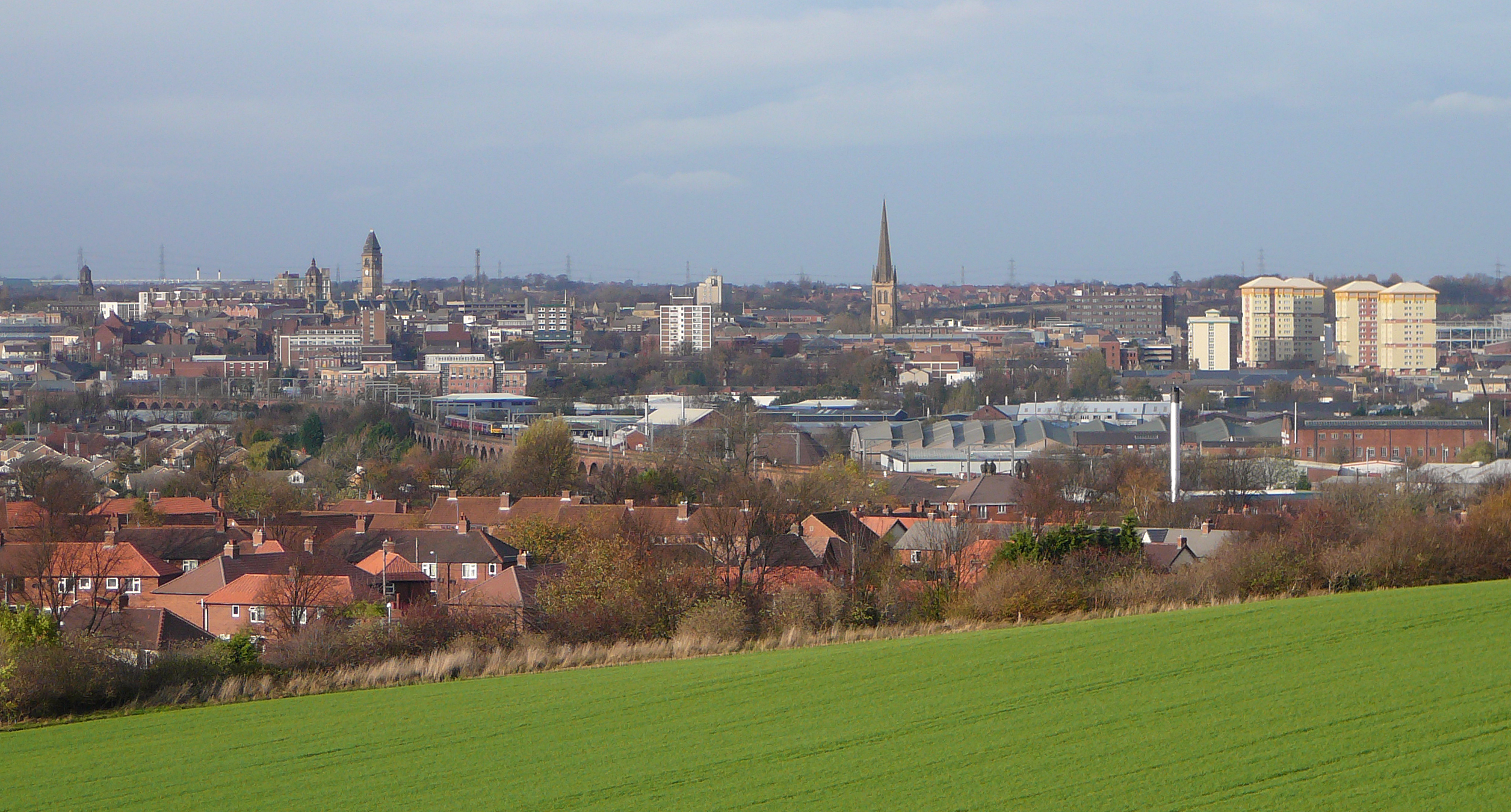
Wakefield, the BUA's third city and previously a centre for coal mining, famous for its cathedral, castle and the historical battle of Wakefield

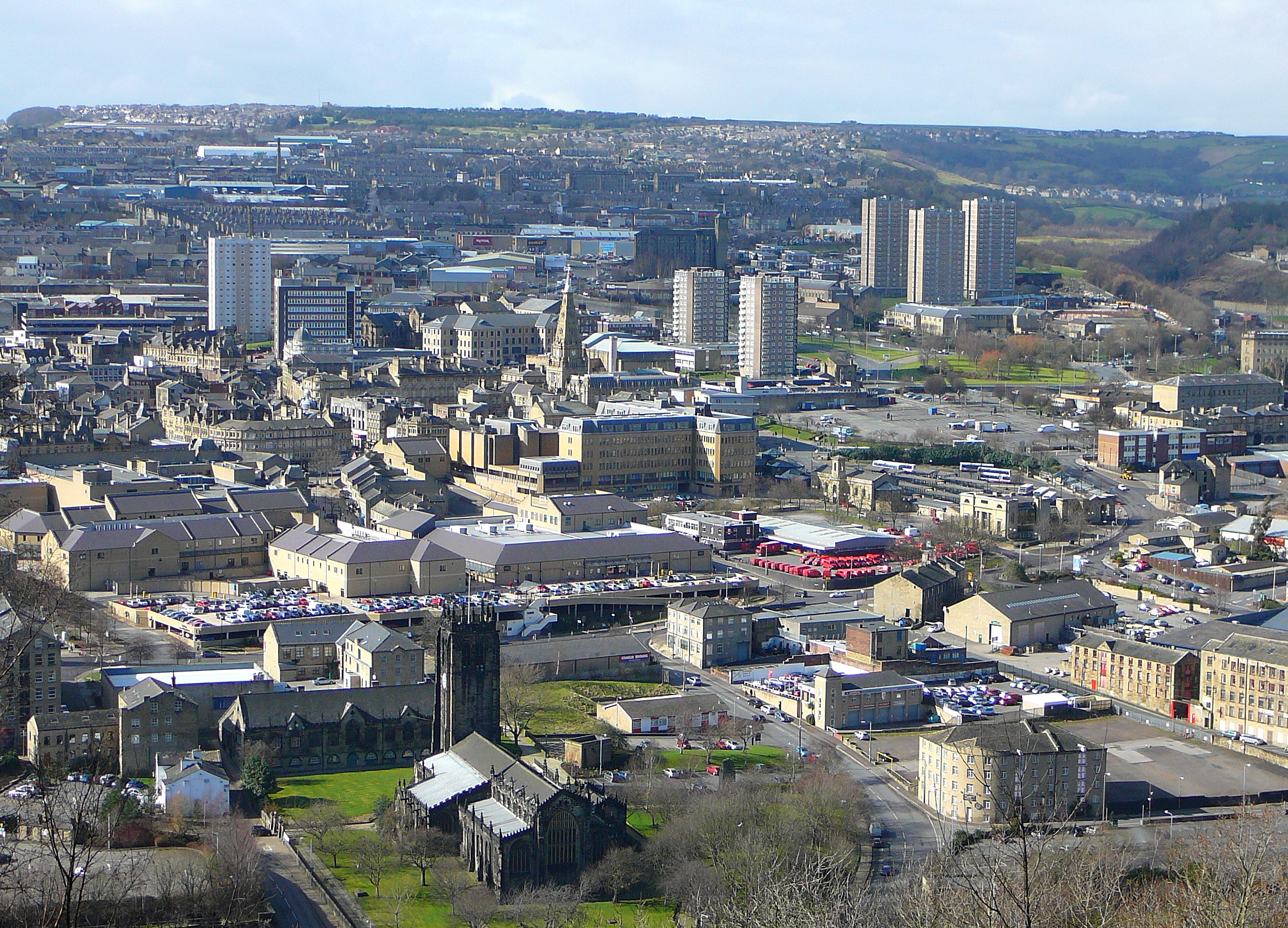
Halifax, a centre for the wool industry since the 1400s and fifth largest settlement in the conurbation, also known for its minster church

The ONS gives the conurbation a population of 1,777,934 (2011 census), which makes it the fourth-most populous in the UK. The ONS partitions the area down into 39 sub-divisions:

- Baildon
- Batley
- Bingley
- Bottom Boat
- Bradford
- Brighouse
- Burley in Wharfedale
- Carlton
- Cleckheaton
- Dewsbury
- East Morton
- Guiseley
- Halifax
- Haworth
- Heckmondwike
- Holmfirth
- Horbury
- Horsforth
- Huddersfield
- Keighley
- Leeds
- Liversedge
- Menston
- Middlestown
- Mirfield
- Morley
- Netherton
- Ossett
- Otley
- Pudsey
- Robin Hood
- Rothwell
- Scholes
- Shipley
- Sowerby Bridge
- Thornton
- Wakefield
- Walton
- Yeadon

Three further subdivisions are given with no population numbers as they are present or former industrial areas with no resident population.

Rawdon is the subdivision name for Horsforth Vale, on which a former industrial plant was redeveloped for housing from 2010, too late to be recorded for the 2011 census.

- Brookfoot Quarry (Marshalls Southowram)
- Esholt Water Treatment plant, named 'Works, nr Bradford' by the ONS
- Rawdon

Note that the areas below do not have exactly the same borders in each census, so the numbers are not always comparable (e.g. what was classified as Lofthouse/Stanley in 2001 was classified as part of Wakefield in 2011).

#	Subdivision	Population 2011	Population 2001	Population 1991	Population 1981
1	Leeds	474,632	443,247	424,194	445,242
2	Bradford	349,561	293,717	289,376	293,336
3	Huddersfield	162,949	146,234	143,726	147,825
4	Wakefield	99,251	76,886	73,955	74,764
5	Halifax	88,134			
6	Dewsbury	62,945	54,341	50,168	49,612
7	Keighley	56,348	49,453	49,567	49,188
8	Batley	46,933			
9	Brighouse	33,286	32,360	32,198	32,597
10	Pudsey	32,216	32,391	31,636	31,943
11	Morley	29,673	54,051	47,579	44,652
12	Shipley	28,694	28,162	28,165	28,815
13	Bingley	22,493	19,884	19,585	18,954
14	Holmfirth	21,706			
15	Ossett	21,231	21,076	20,405	20,417
16	Yeadon	19,668			
17	Rothwell	19,512			
18	Mirfield	19,330	18,390	18,459	18,599
19	Horsforth	18,895	18,928	18,593	19,205
20	Liversedge	17,697			
21	Baildon	15,944	15,368	15,385	14,907
22	Otley	14,215			
23	Heckmondwike	12,085	11,291	9,855	9,775
24	Guiseley	11,960			
25	Cleckheaton	11,648			
26	Horbury	10,361	10,002	9,186	9,792
27	Burley in Wharfedale	7,041			
28	Haworth	6,379			
29	Thornton	5,289			
30	Sowerby Bridge	4,601			
31	Menston	4,369	4,660	4,888	4,865
32	Netherton	3,686			
33	Robin Hood	3,573			
34	Walton	3,231			
35	Middlestown	2,366			
36	Scholes	2,317			
37	Bottom Boat	1,169			
38	East Morton	1,169			
39	Carlton	842			
	Guiseley/Yeadon		31,381	31,104	30,811
	Cleckheaton and Liversedge		26,796	27,151	26,340
	Lofthouse/Stanley		22,947	19,136	17,439
	Holmfirth/Honley		22,690	21,979	21,138
	Queensbury		8,718	7,424	7,410
	Shelf		4,496	4,237	4,204
	New Farnley		2,548		
Total		1,777,934	1,499,465	1,445,981	1,467,412

2011 subdivision notes:

Lofthouse merged into Wakefield.
Stanley merged into Wakefield.
Honley merged into Holmfirth.
Queensbury merged into Bradford and Shelf merged into Halifax.

New Farnley merged into Leeds.
