= Potterton, West Yorkshire =

Hamlet in West Yorkshire, England

Coordinates: 53.844°N 1.390°W

Potterton
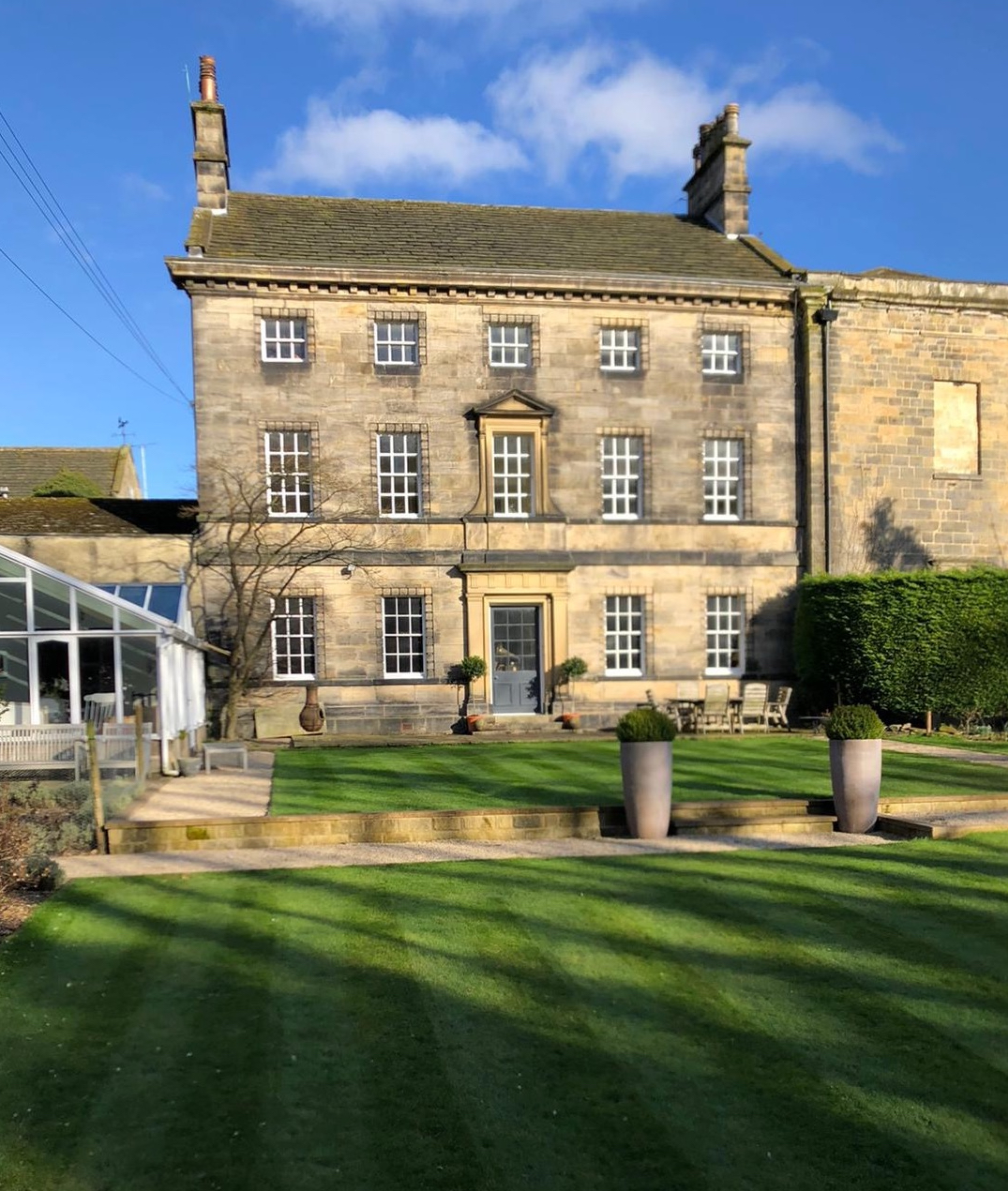
- West wing of Potterton Hall

- Location within West Yorkshire
- OS grid reference: SE402388
- Civil parish: Barwick in Elmet and Scholes
- Metropolitan borough: City of Leeds
- Metropolitan county: West Yorkshire
- Region: Yorkshire and the Humber
- Country: England
- Sovereign state: United Kingdom
- Post town: LEEDS
- Postcode district: LS14/LS15
- Dialling code: 0113
- Police: West Yorkshire
- Fire: West Yorkshire
- Ambulance: Yorkshire
- UK Parliament: Elmet & Rothwell

Potterton is a hamlet 1 mile (1.5 km) north of Barwick-in-Elmet in City of Leeds, West Yorkshire, England. It falls within the Harewood ward of the Leeds Metropolitan Council. It is just south of the A64 road and so has access to junction 44 of the A1(M) motorway 2.5 miles (4 km) away, with Leeds only 7 miles (11 km) to the west.

The hamlet is described in the Domesday Book as being part of the Skyrack Wapentake and belonging to Earl Edwin. The name itself is said to derive from 'Pottere Tun', meaning 'The Potter's farmstead'.

The west wing of Potterton Hall was declared a Grade II* listed building in 1982.

South of Potterton lies the deserted medieval village of Potterton, which includes many earthworks and a Holloway. The area is scheduled as an ancient monument.

== See also ==
- Listed buildings in Barwick in Elmet and Scholes
