= Scholes, Cleckheaton =

Village in West Yorkshire, England

Coordinates: 53.73°N 1.744°W

Scholes
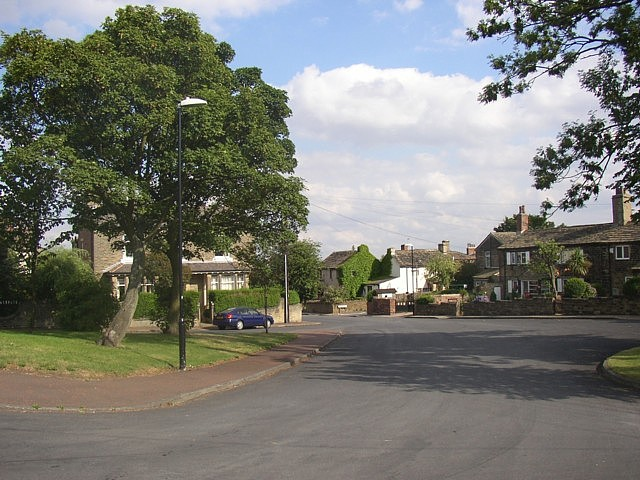
- Town Gate

- Location within West Yorkshire
- Metropolitan borough: Kirklees
- Metropolitan county: West Yorkshire
- Region: Yorkshire and the Humber
- Country: England
- Sovereign state: United Kingdom
- Post town: CLECKHEATON
- Postcode district: BD19
- Dialling code: 01274
- Police: West Yorkshire
- Fire: West Yorkshire
- Ambulance: Yorkshire

Scholes is a village near Cleckheaton, West Yorkshire, England.

The village is 5 miles (8 km) south of Bradford between Wyke and Cleckheaton near to the M62 motorway.

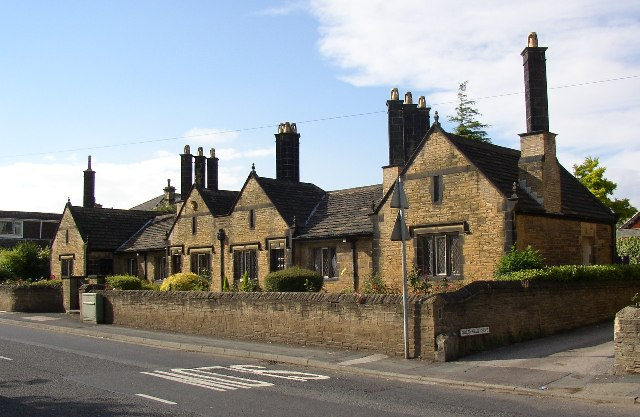
Almshouses in New Road East

The village was originally known as "Scales" and was a hamlet in the township of Cleckheaton. In the 18th century the most prominent industry in the village was "card making" (combing cotton or linen.). Later on a Coal mine opened in the area but that closed early in the 20th century.

== Other Scholes in West Yorkshire ==
There are two other villages and a hamlet in West Yorkshire known as "Scholes". One village is near Holmfirth, the other is near Leeds and a hamlet near Oakworth, near Keighley. For others see Scholes.

== See also ==
- Listed buildings in Cleckheaton
