= Stanley Urban District =

Stanley Urban District could refer to:

- Stanley Urban District, County Durham
- Stanley Urban District, Yorkshire
