= All Saints' Church, Barwick-in-Elmet =

Coordinates: 53°49′53.0″N 1°23′32.9″W

All Saints' Church
- Church of All Saints'
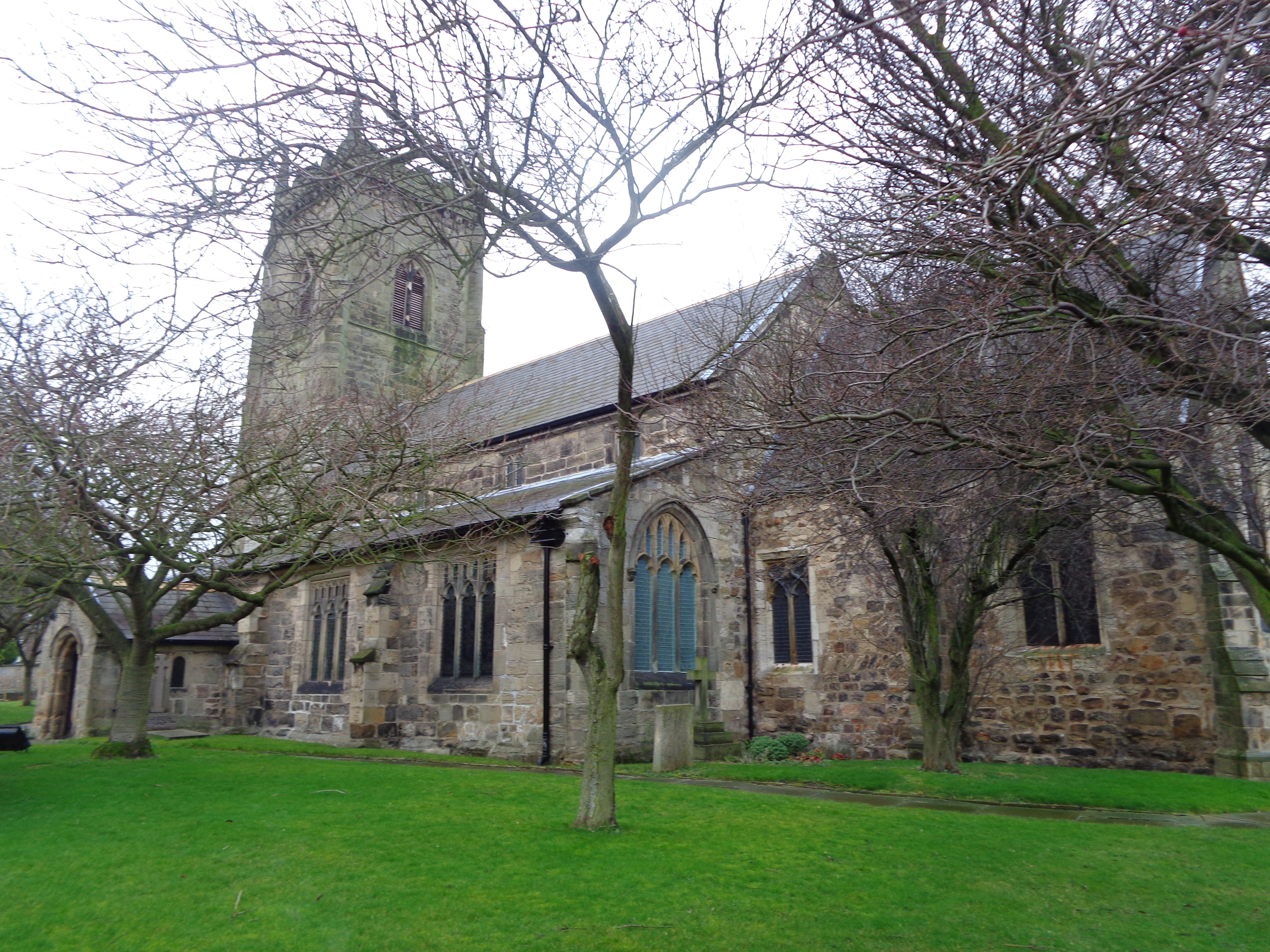
- All Saints' Church
- OS grid reference: SE 40085 37410
- Location: Barwick-in-Elmet, West Yorkshire
- Country: England
- Denomination: Church of England

History
- Status: Parish Church

Architecture
- Heritage designation: Grade II* listed building

Specifications
- Materials: Dressed limestone with Welsh slate roof

Administration
- Province: York
- Diocese: Leeds
- Archdeaconry: Leeds
- Parish: Barwick-in-Elmet and Scholes

All Saints' Church in Barwick-in-Elmet, West Yorkshire, England is an active Anglican parish church in the archdeaconry of Leeds and the Diocese of Leeds.

== History ==
The church has Anglo-Saxon and Norman remains. The chancel is of 14th-century origin and the aisles and tower of 15th century. In the early 19th century a vestry was added; while from 1844–55 the church was restored by developer G. Fowler Jones of York to designs by architect Sir G. Gilbert Scott. In 1869 new parapets and pinnacles were added. The church was Grade II* listed on 22 July 1986.

== Architectural style ==
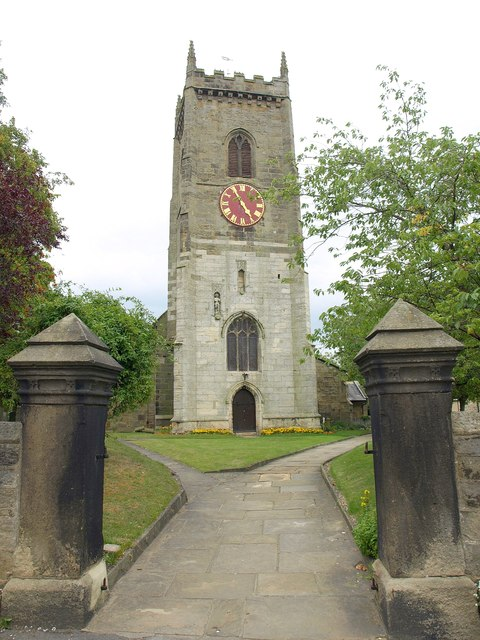
The 15th century tower

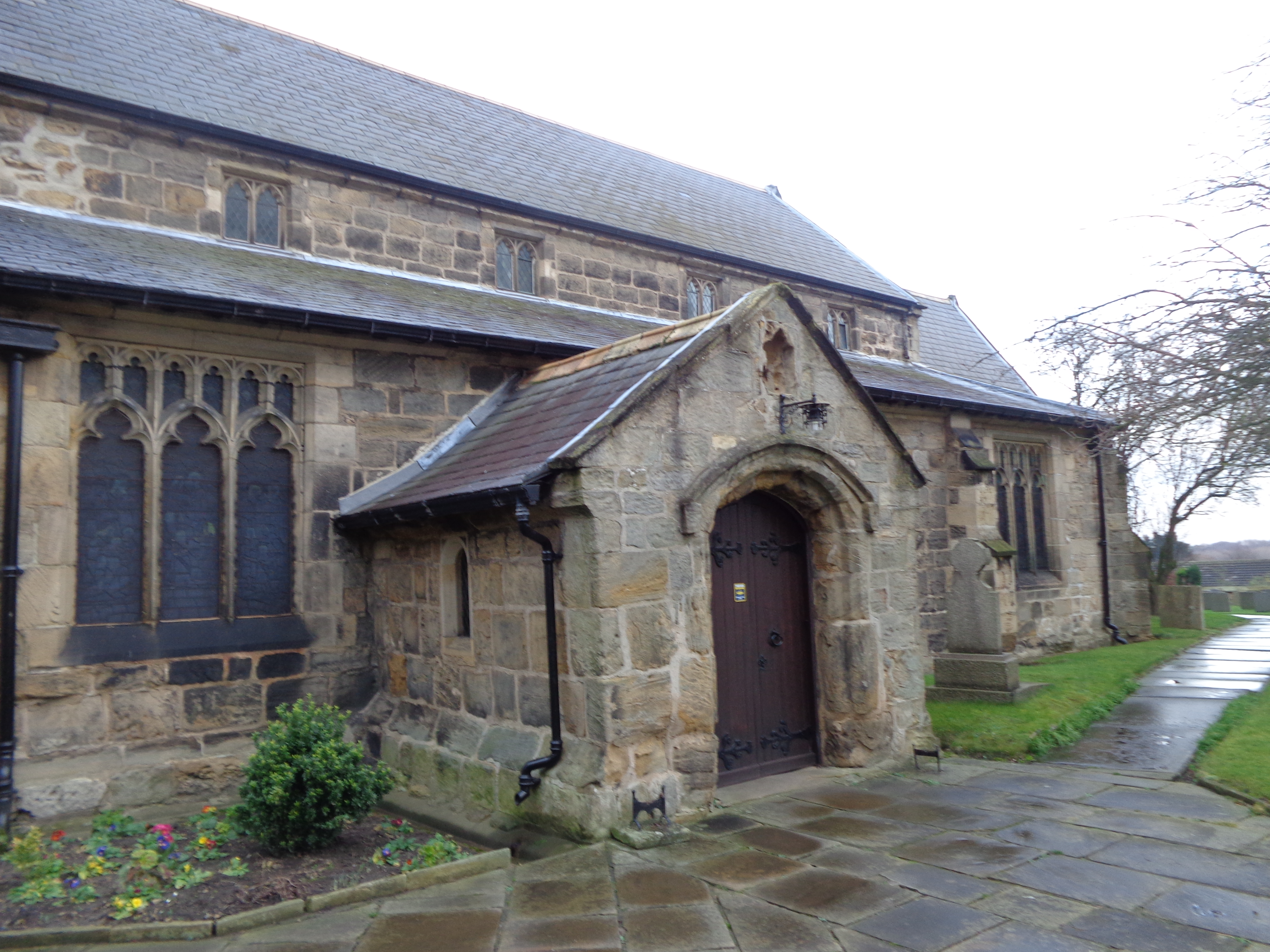
The 16th century south porch

=== Exterior ===
The church has Anglo-Saxon and Norman remains. The chancel is the oldest remaining part being of 14th-century origin. There is a south porch of 16th-century origin. The church is of a perpendicular style; the tower of two stages with a large red clock face and a two-light belfry window. The west face has a sculpture of the church's benefactor Sir Henry Vavasour. The church is situated on ground raised from the road which is lawned and accommodated a small cemetery.

=== Interior ===
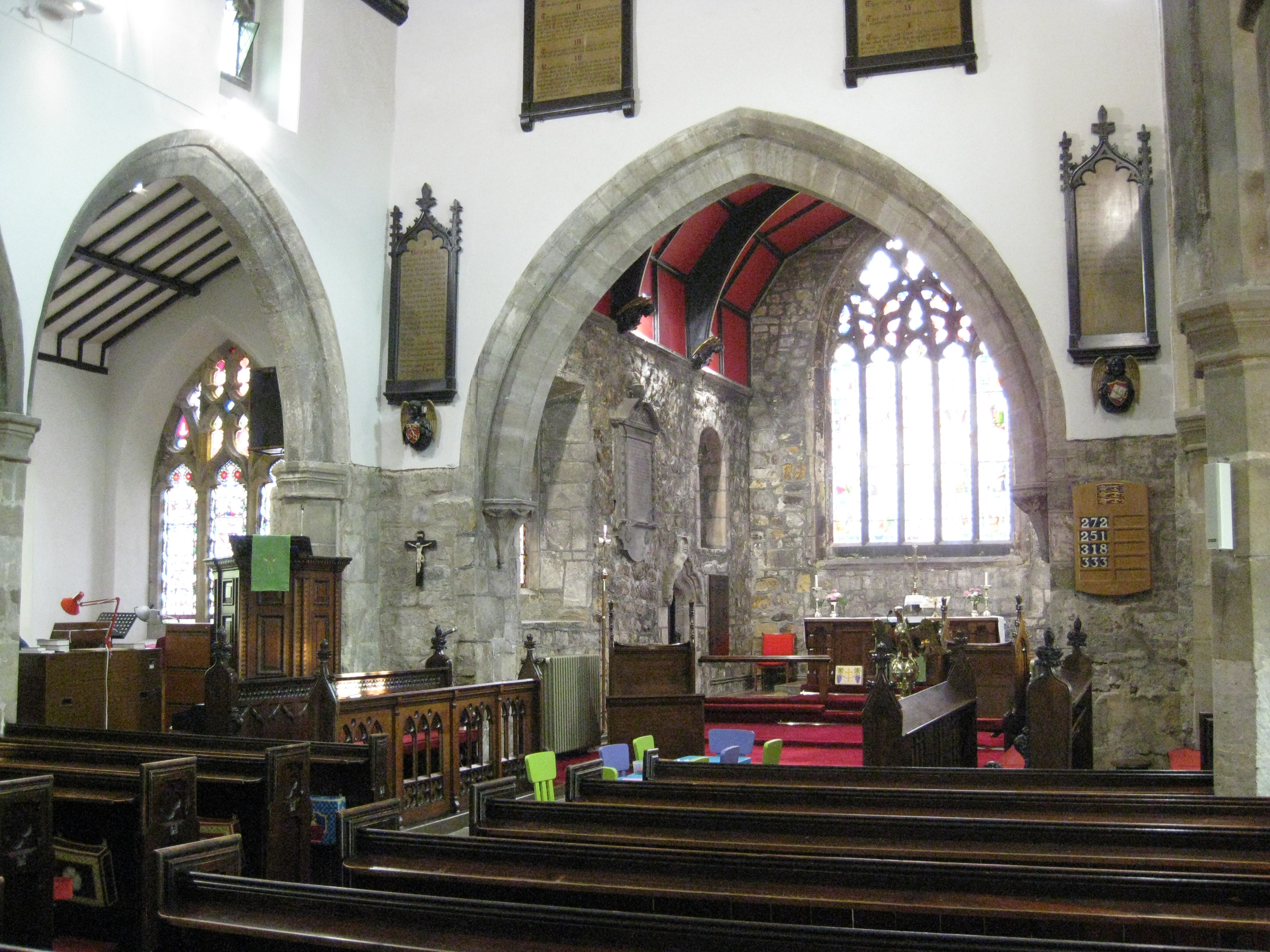
Interior

The church has a Georgian era hexagonal oak pulpit. There is a carved reading desk, 19th century pews and various stone monuments. There are several stained glass windows, the east window of north aisle (1858) is dedicated to the Gascoigne family with heraldic symbols and knights set in while the chancel has a Norman window with deeply splayed sides. The chancel and nave have a 19th-century hammer-beamed roof.

== Parish ==
The church is the larger of two churches in the Parish of Barwick and Elmet and Scholes; the other church being St. Philip's at Scholes.

== See also ==
- List of places of worship in the City of Leeds
- Grade II* listed buildings in Leeds
- Listed buildings in Barwick in Elmet and Scholes
