= Listed buildings in Barwick in Elmet and Scholes =

Barwick in Elmet and Scholes is a civil parish in the metropolitan borough of the City of Leeds, West Yorkshire, England. It contains 23 listed buildings that are recorded in the National Heritage List for England. Of these, three are listed at Grade I, the highest of the three grades, four are at Grade II*, the middle grade, and the others are at Grade II, the lowest grade. The parish contains the villages of Barwick-in-Elmet, Potterton and Scholes, and the surrounding countryside. Part of Bramham Park is in the parish, and in the grounds are listed buildings. The largest house in the parish is Potterton Hall, which is listed together with associated structures. The other listed buildings include a medieval cross base surmounted by a war memorial, a church and its former rectory, other houses, farmhouses and farm buildings, a road bridge, and a milestone.

== Key ==
Grade	Criteria
I	Buildings of exceptional interest, sometimes considered to be internationally important
II*	Particularly important buildings of more than special interest
II	Buildings of national importance and special interest

== Buildings ==
Name and location	Photograph	Date	Notes	Grade
Crossbase and War Memorial; 53.83190°N 1.39393°W		Medieval	The medieval cross base is in freestone, and consists of four steps. On the base is a limestone war memorial consisting of a plinth, a tapering shaft, and a wheel-head cross carved with Celtic interlace. On the south face of the shaft and plinth are three brass plaques with inscriptions and the names of those lost in the two World Wars.	II
All Saints' Church, Barwick-in-Elmet; 53.83143°N 1.39243°W		14th century	The church contains Anglo Saxon and Norman material, the chancel is the oldest part, and the tower and some other parts date from the mid 15th century, there were later alterations, and the church was restored in 1856 by G. Fowler Jones. The lower part of the tower is in Magnesian Limestone, the rest of the tower and church are in gritstone, and the roofs are in Welsh blue slate. The church consists of a nave with a clerestory, north and south aisles, a south porch, a chancel with a north vestry, and a west tower, and is in Perpendicular style. The tower has two stages and contains a doorway with a pointed head, a three-light window with a hood mould, two niches, one with a statue, a large clock face, a corbel table, and an embattled parapet. In the north wall of the chancel is a Norman window.	II*
Kiddal Hall and farm buildings 53.84920°N 1.40185°W		Late medieval	A manor house that has been much altered and reduced, with attached farm buildings. The house is in stone on a plinth, with quoins and a stone slate roof. There are two storeys, and an irregular L-shaped plan, with a three-bay hall range and a cross-wing. The house has a later gabled porch, and the windows are mullioned. Attached to the house is a long range of farm buildings, including a segmental-arched gateway. The buildings have roofs of concrete pantiles and corrugated iron, and contain various openings, including two late medieval doorways, one with a Tudor arched lintel.	II
Barn, Kiddal Hall Farm; 53.84933°N 1.40247°W	—	Mid 16th century	The barn is timber framed and was encased in stone probably in the 18th century. It has quoins, a roof of corrugated iron, seven bays, and a single aisle. The barn contains a full-height cart entry and vents.	II
Kiddal Hall Farmhouse; 53.84916°N 1.40265°W	—	Mid 17th century	Probably originally the kitchen to Kiddal Hall, it contains earlier roof structure. The building is in gritstone with quoins, and a roof of Welsh blue slate and corrugated iron with a coped gable with kneelers on the left. There are two storeys and an L-shaped plan, with three bays and a wing at right angles. The doorways, two on the ground floor and one in the upper floor, have chamfered surrounds and Tudor arched lintels, and the windows are mullioned.	II
Flying Horse Farmhouse; 53.84446°N 1.41270°W	—	Mid 17th century	The farmhouse, which was at one time an inn, was extended in the 18th century. It is in stone, the wing rendered, with stone slate roofs. There are two storeys, and an L-shaped plan with a three-bay range, a three-bay rear wing, and a continuous rear outshut. The main range contains doorways, one with a monolithic lintel, most of the windows are sashes, those in the wing with false voussoirs, and there is a blocked oval window in the main range.	II
The Old Rectory; 53.83136°N 1.39389°W	—	Late 17th century	The rectory, later a private house, is in rendered brick with rusticated quoins, moulded gutter brackets, and a hipped double-span roof of Westmorland green slate. There are two storeys and attics, a double-depth plan, and five bays. In the left two bays of the garden front is a canted bay window, the other windows are sashes with architraves, and in the attic are two dormers with hipped roofs. In the entrance front is a porch, a doorway with a fanlight, a moulded cornice and a blocking course.	II
Wall to south terrace and garden, Bramham Park; 53.86507°N 1.38390°W	—	c. 1727–28	The retaining wall to the south terrace and the eastern part of the garden is in stone. It is a long wall about ten courses high, with buttressed piers at intervals. In the centre of the terrace to the south of the T-shaped canal is a semicircular projection. The wall then turns north and supports the garden walks.	I
Retaining walls of T-shaped pond, Bramham Park; 53.86558°N 1.38377°W	—	1728	The walls of the short cross-piece of the pond are in stone with chamfered angled coping. The long length of the pond has banks of earth to allow water fowl to enter it.	I
West wing, Potterton Hall; 53.84561°N 1.38421°W		c. 1740	The house is in stone, on a plinth, with bands, a bracketed moulded cornice, and a stone slate roof with coped gables and kneelers. There are three storeys and a symmetrical front of five bays. In the centre is a doorway with Doric pilasters, an architrave, a frieze with triglyphs and guttae, and a moulded cornice. The window above the doorway has an architrave, a pulvinated frieze, and a triangular pediment on consoles. The other windows are sashes with unusual rusticated surrounds. At the rear is a doorway with a stair window above.	II*
Temple of Leod Lud, Bramham Park; 53.85908°N 1.37312°W		Mid 18th century	An ornamental garden temple, it is in stone, with a stone slate roof and a single storey. Three steps lead up to the podium, on which is a Tuscan portico distyle in antis, with an entablature and a triangular pediment. On the side walls are rectangular windows and a cornice.	II*
The Rotunda, Bramham Park; 53.86212°N 1.37259°W		Mid 18th century	An ornamental garden temple, it is in sandstone, and consists of a circular Ionic temple. It has a circular podium of three steps, a colonnade on 16 unfluted Roman Ionic columns carrying an entablature, a pulvinated frieze, and a modillioned cornice. The inner drum has a rusticated base and a sill band with Greek key decoration. There are two doorways with architraves, pulvinated friezes, and moulded cornices, flanked by blocked windows with architraves. The central drum on the top has a cornice, a blocking course and a lead dome.	I
Barn and stables, Potterton Hall; 53.84591°N 1.38390°W	—	Mid 18th century	The farm buildings are in stone with quoins, moulded gutter brackets, and a stone slate roof with coped gables and kneelers. There are two storeys and nine bays. In the centre is a segmental-arched cart entry with voussoirs and a dropped keystone, and there are stable doors and pitching holes. At the rear are mullioned windows, rectangular vents, and other inserted windows. On the left gable is a weathervane decorated with a mounted horse.	II
Gate piers, walls and railings, Potterton Hall; 53.84511°N 1.38683°W		Mid 18th century	Flanking the entrance to the drive are stone gate piers, the central pairs with banded rustication, and moulded cornices. The inner pair have bases for finials, and the smaller outer piers have pyramidal caps. Curving from these are stone walls with chamfered coping and cast iron railings, and at the ends are lower, plain piers.	II
Well-head and troughs, Potterton Hall; 53.84419°N 1.38399°W	—	Mid 18th century (probable)	The well head and troughs are in the grounds to the south of the hall, and are in stone. The well head has a basket arch and a dropped keystone. Under the arch is a segmental-shaped trough, and to its right is a rectangular rough with a central opening in the wall.	II
Lime Trees Farmhouse; 53.82899°N 1.39443°W	—	Mid to late 18th century	The house, with an attached barn, is in stone, partly rendered, with a Welsh blue slate roof. There are two storeys, two bays, a short gabled wing, and an outshut. The doorways have plain surrounds, most of the windows are sashes, there is a small horizontally-sliding sash window, and the windows at the rear have wedge lintels.	II
Morwick Hall; 53.83163°N 1.43843°W	—	Mid to late 18th century	A large house that was altered and enlarged in about 1900, and since used as offices. It is in stone with rusticated quoins, bands, and stone slate roofs. The original part has a symmetrical front of five bays, and a ten-bay extension to the left. The three bays at the left have two storeys and the rest has three storeys. Over the middle three bays of the original part is a pedimented gable, in the tympanum of which is a blind plaque in an architrave. The central porch has an open pediment on large consoles, and a doorway with monolithic jambs. The windows are sashes.	II
Potterton Bridge; 53.83837°N 1.38961°W		Mid to late 18th century	The bridge carries Potterton Lane over Potterton Beck. It is in stone and consists of a single semicircular arch. The bridge has voussoirs, a band, and a parapet with projecting coping. The outer walls sweep out, and end in square piers surmounted by drums with coved caps.	II
Obelisk, Bramham Park; 53.86053°N 1.37102°W		1768–72	The obelisk was designed by John Carr for George Fox-Lane, 1st Baron Bingley as a memorial for his son, Robert Fox-Lane. It is in stone and consists of a tall square obelisk on a moulded plinth, and has a tapering shaft surmounted by a giant urn. On three faces of the plinth are inscribed marble tablets. The monument is enclosed by a low stone wall with cast iron railings and circular columns on the corners with ball finials.	II*
South and east wings, Potterton Hall; 53.84555°N 1.38398°W	—	c. 1787–88	The wings are in stone with stone slate roofs. The south wing has a plinth and a hipped roof. There are two storeys at the front and three at the rear, a symmetrical front of seven bays, the middle three bays projecting under a pedimented gable with an oeil-de-boeuf window in the tympanum. In the centre is a Tuscan porch with an entablature, a moulded cornice and a blocking course, and a doorway with a fanlight. The windows are sashes, the window above the porch with an architrave. Recessed to the right is the former service wing, with two storeys and four bays.	II
Elmwood House; 53.83023°N 1.39502°W	—	Early 19th century	The house, which includes part of No. 46 Main Street, is rendered, with widely spaced gutter brackets, a stone slate roof, two storeys, and four bays. The doorway has monolithic jambs, a fanlight, and a modillioned cornice, and the windows are sashes with architraves. At the rear are two gables, a doorway with a stair window above, and a segmental bow window.	II
Terry Lug; 53.87395°N 1.38757°W	—	Early 19th century	A stone farmhouse with a hipped slate roof, two storeys, and three bays. The central round-arched doorway has a fanlight with radial glazing bars, and the windows are sashes, those in the ground floor with tall voussoirs.	II
Milestone; 53.85124°N 1.39298°W		Mid 19th century	The milestone is on the north side of York Road (A64 road) at its junction with Kiddal Lane. It is in stone with cast iron overlay, and has a triangular plan and a rounded top. On the top is inscribed "TADCASTER AND HALTONDIAL" and "TURNPIKE ROAD", and on the sides are the distances to Tadcaster and Leeds.	II
