= Sholes =

Sholes may refer to:

- Sholes, Nebraska, a US village
- Motorola Droid, an Android-based smartphone by Motorola, previously publicized under the codenames Sholes and Tao and the model number A855.

== People with the surname ==
- Charles Sholes (Wisconsin politician), American politician
- Christopher Latham Sholes, American inventor of one of the early typewriters
- Stephen H. Sholes, American recording executive and musician

== See also ==
- Scholes (disambiguation)
- Shoal
