= St Peter's Church, Stanley, West Yorkshire =

St Peter's Church
- Church of Saint Peter
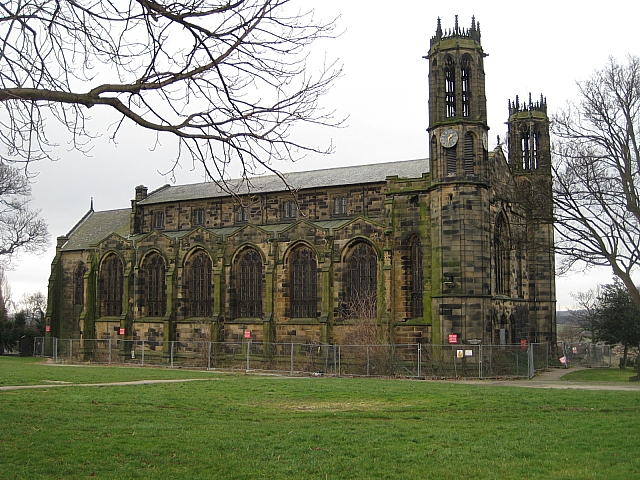

- 53.7152°N 1.4740°W
- OS grid reference: SE 34963 24246
- Location: Aberford Road, Stanley, Wakefield, West Yorkshire
- Country: England
- Denomination: Church of England

History
- Status: Parish Church

Architecture
- Heritage designation: Grade II listed building
- Style: Gothic Revival
- Groundbreaking: 1821
- Completed: 1824
- Construction cost: £12,000
- Closed: 2001
- Demolished: 2014

St Peter's Church in Stanley, Wakefield, West Yorkshire, England was a Church of England church. The church opened in 1824, closed in 2001 and after falling into disrepair was demolished in 2014.

== History ==
The church was built between 1821 and 1824 by a design to Peter Atkinson Junior and was rebuilt between 1911 and 1913. The original construction costs were £12,000. Much of the building was destroyed in a fire on 18 February 1911, which left only the walls standing. The church was rebuilt and opened in July 1913.

=== Use in television ===
The church was used as the interior and crypt of the 'Parish Church of St Matthew' in The Beiderbecke Affair. The exterior were filmed however in St Mark's Church in Woodhouse, Leeds.

== Architectural style ==
=== Exterior ===
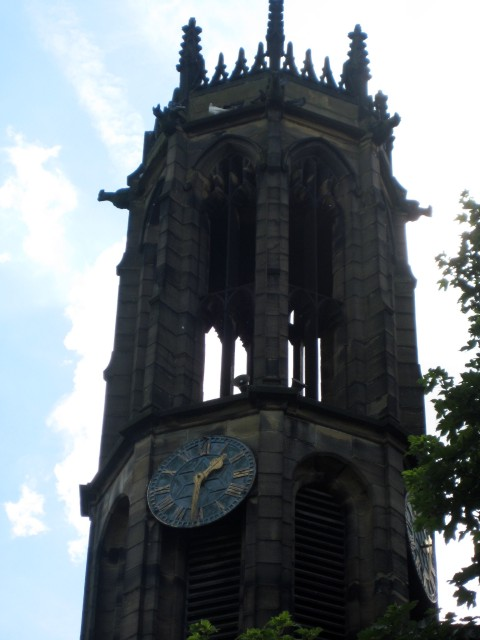
One of the towers; the clock was added to commemorate the Coronation of Elizabeth II.

The church was of ashlar with a Welsh slate roof. There were twin four stage octagonal towers to the west side of and the church had a six-bay nave and a two-bay nave. A vestry was later added to the south side of the church. There was an external access to the crypt.

=== Interior ===
There is a tall nave with six-bay arcades. The aisle and chancel roofs had wooden vaulting. There was a south chapel which sat separate to the main chapel. The church had a carved stone fault with an oak cover added in 1916 and a decorated tracery with a crocketed spire.

== Closure and demolition ==
After the diocese of Wakefield realised it would require £1 million of repairs to make the building safe the decision was taken to close the church in 2001. After a deal between the diocese and a developer fell through and a public consultation took place a decision was taken to demolish the building. Campaigners fought to preserve the building and called for Secretary of State for Communities and Local Government Eric Pickles to order a public inquiry, however this wasn't to happen. The Victorian Society and the Ancient Monuments Society also called for the buildings preservation. A controversy arose after 16 misericords depicting the 16 stages of creation carved by HP Jackson in the 1920s were removed by contractors and later turned up on eBay and at a London dealer.

=== Relocation ===
The church relocated to its former church centre on Lake Lock Road in December 2001. The current premises are much smaller than the original church.
