= Bottom Boat =

Village in Wakefield, West Yorkshire, England

Coordinates: 53.718°N 1.458°W

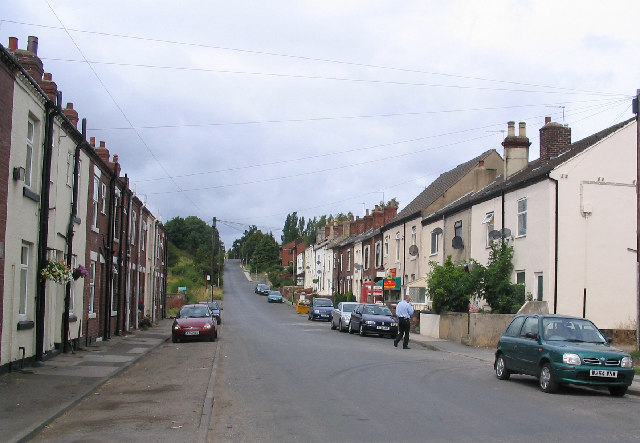

- Location within West Yorkshire
- Population: 1,169
- Metropolitan borough: City of Wakefield
- Metropolitan county: West Yorkshire
- Region: Yorkshire and the Humber
- Country: England
- Sovereign state: United Kingdom
- Police: West Yorkshire
- Fire: West Yorkshire
- Ambulance: Yorkshire

Bottom Boat is a village in the Wakefield district of West Yorkshire. In the 2011 United Kingdom census, its population was 1,169, and it was included as part of the West Yorkshire Built-up Area, which had a total population of 1,777,934.

Before the enactment of the Local Government Act 1972, it was part of the Stanley Urban District.

Most of the current houses in Bottom Boat were built for workers at the Newmarket Silkstone Colliery. The colliery closed on 29 September 1983, only a few months before the start of a year-long strike in the British mining industry. This closure was not opposed by the NUM as it had been agreed under the previous Labour Government's "Plan for Coal" on the condition that the workforce could transfer to the new Selby Coalfield.

A Primitive Methodist chapel designed by Thomas Howdill was established in 1874.
