= Peter Brook (painter) =

English painter (1927–2009)

Peter Brook RBA (1927–2009) was an English artist, best known for his landscape paintings.

== Life and career ==
Peter Brook was born in Scholes, Holme Valley, West Yorkshire to farmer parents. He was educated at Goldsmith's College where he studied to become a teacher while attending evening drawing classes and visiting art galleries. He returned to West Yorkshire where he worked as a teacher, first at Rastrick and then Sowerby. He married Molly in 1950.

Brook painted rural landscapes, farmhouses and scenes from different facets of British life. In 1957 his oil of a street scene in Huddersfield was included as one of the "Young Artists of Promise" in Jack Beddington's book of that name. In his early career he painted the houses, and mills, surrounding his home in Brighouse, West Yorkshire. He taught art at a local school and often told his students that "inspiration was all around".

It was only when he was offered a contract with Thomas Agnew & Sons of London that Brook was able to become a full time artist. He worked with Agnew's for many years, with numerous exhibitions in London, as well as in the US and Australia, although Brook himself never travelled abroad.

He was elected to the Royal Society of British Artists in 1962.

His work caught the eye of many celebrities of the day including Rodney Bewes, Frank Windsor, Tom Courtenay and others. Yorkshire-born Hollywood star James Mason purchased more than 20 of Brook's original paintings. Brook appears in the television documentary Home James which sees Mason visit his home town of Huddersfield and has clips of him out walking on the moors with Brook.
