= Scoles =

Scoles and Schoales are surnames, pronounced similarly. Notable people with these surnames include:

== Scoles ==
- Alexander Scoles (1844–1920), architect and Roman Catholic priest
- Giacinto Scoles (born 1935), European and North American chemist and physicist
- Ignatius Scoles SJ (1834–1896), Roman Catholic Jesuit priest, architect and writer
- Joseph John Scoles (1798–1863), English Gothic Revival architect who designed many Roman Catholic churches
- Mary Anne Scoles (1896–2007), Canadian supercentenarian born in Manitoba

== Schoales ==
- John Schoales, jun (1810–1847), official guardian of Parkhurst apprentices in Western Australia
- John Whitelaw Schoales (1820–1903), Anglican priest in South Australia

== See also ==
- Scoles Manor, former farmhouse and a Grade II* listed building near Corfe Castle in Dorset, England
- Coles (disambiguation)
- Scholes (disambiguation)
- Schoolies (disambiguation)
- Scole
- Scolesa
