= Scholes, Holme Valley =

Village in West Yorkshire, England

Coordinates: 53.564°N 1.760°W

Scholes
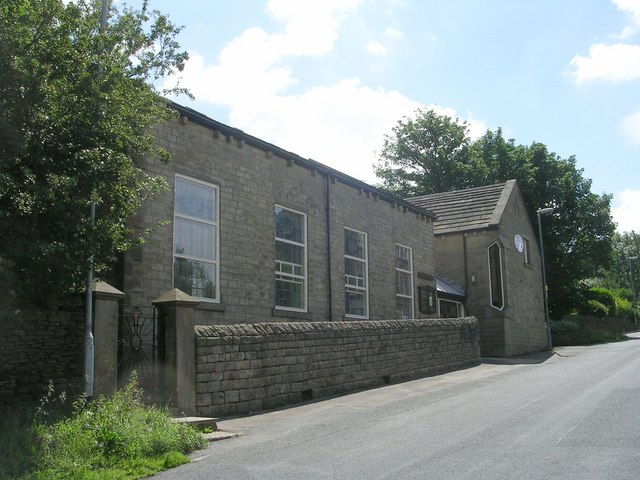

- Location within West Yorkshire
- Population: 1,990
- OS grid reference: SE159075
- Civil parish: Holme Valley
- Metropolitan borough: Kirklees
- Metropolitan county: West Yorkshire
- Region: Yorkshire and the Humber
- Country: England
- Sovereign state: United Kingdom
- Post town: HOLMFIRTH
- Postcode district: HD9
- Dialling code: 01484
- Police: West Yorkshire
- Fire: West Yorkshire
- Ambulance: Yorkshire
- UK Parliament: Colne Valley

Scholes is a village and former civil parish, now in the parish of Holme Valley, in Kirklees, West Yorkshire, England. It is situated 1 mile (1.6 km) to the south-east and above Holmfirth, 7 miles (11 km) south of Huddersfield, in the Holme Valley. It has a population of 1,990. The name Scholes may have originated from the Scandinavian language meaning 'the temporary huts or sheds'.

The village contains one non-denominational primary school, originally built in 1908, modernised and extended in 1976 and then further extended in 1986. The school caters for approximately 213 pupils aged four to eleven.

Scholes was the birthplace of Roy Castle – entertainer and the presenter of the long-running BBC show Record Breakers.

Peter Brook was born in Scholes.

== Local sports ==
Scholes has a successful cricket team in the Drakes Huddersfield League and a football team, (Scholes FC) who sealed promotion to Division 1 of the Huddersfield & District FA competition as of the end of the 2018–19 season with a game to spare finishing second in Division 2 on 59 points.

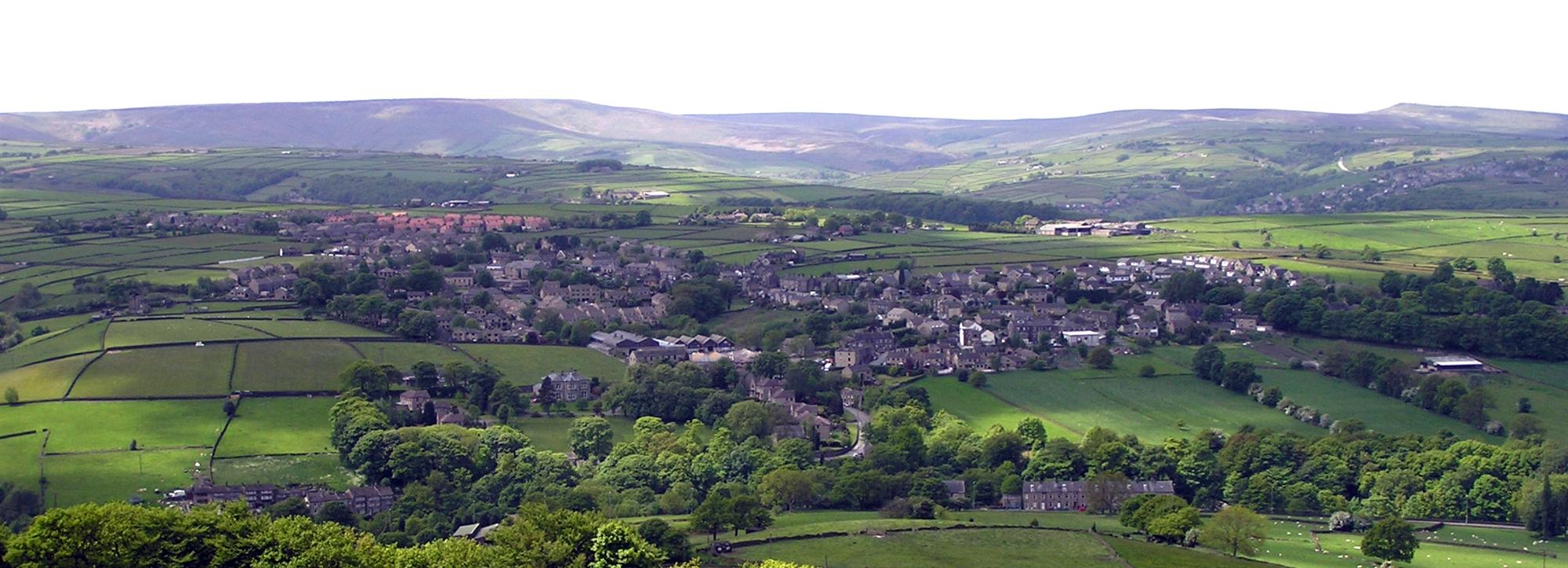
View of Scholes, Holmfirth

== Civil parish ==
Scholes became a civil parish on 31 December 1894, being formed from Wooldale, Fulstone and Hepworth. On 1 April 1938, the parish was abolished and merged with Holmfirth, part also went to form Dunford. In 1931 the parish had a population of 1571.

== Scholes in West Yorkshire ==
There are three other places called Scholes in West Yorkshire:

- Scholes, Cleckheaton, a village near Cleckheaton
- Scholes, Leeds, a village east of Leeds
- Scholes, Bradford, a hamlet near Oakworth, east of Keighley
