= Theophilus Scholes =

Theophilus Edward Samuel Scholes (pseudonym Bartholomew Smith) (c. 1858–c. 1940) was a Baptist missionary, medical doctor and political commentator.

Scholes was born in Stewart Town, Trelawney Parish, Jamaica. He was the son of John Robinson Scholes, but his mother has not been identified. His brother, George, emigrated to the United States. His sister Matilda did likewise, but when Theo was in the Congo, he was expecting her to join him there in missionary work, coming via England.

He left Jamaica in 1873 for Panama and then spent sometime at sea before arriving in London in 1878. Here he was able to enroll in a Baptist missionary training course at the East London Missionary Training Institute. After completing his trainings as a baptist minister in 1880 there, he moved onto Edinburgh, where he qualified as a doctor in 1884. After spending time in the Congo Free State and Nigeria he returned to London.

In 1903 he published a critique of Joseph Chamberlain, the British Colonial Secretary who had proposed colonial policies whose benefits were only available for white British subjects. On the contrary, Scholes argued, Africans and those of African descent could make important contributions to progress if they were not subject to such artificial constraints.

== Books ==
- 1899: The British Empire and Alliances London: Elliot Stock
- 1903: "Bartholomew Smith" [Scholes] [ Chamberlain and Chamberlainism] London:John Long
- 1905: Glimpses of the Ages: Vol I London:John Long
- 1908: Glimpses of the Ages: Vol II London:John Long
