= James Christopher Scholes =

English antiquary

James Christopher Scholes (27 March 1852 – 18 June 1890) was an English antiquary.

== Life ==
The son of James Scholes, a printer and bookbinder, James Christopher Scholes was born at Bolton, Lancashire, and educated at the Holy Trinity School there.

Scholes trained as a printer then worked a reporter on a local newspaper, and later became a draper. He served as a member of the Bolton Board of Guardians of the Poor, and as a member of the Bolton School Board.

In 1877, Scholes married Ann Frost, who became his business manager. Scholes then devoted his time to his antiquarian and genealogical pursuits.

Scholes died on 18 June 1890 and was buried in Tonge Cemetery in Bolton.

== Works ==
Scholes's main publications were:

- Bolton Bibliography and Jottings of Book Lore, with Notes on Local Authors and Printers, 1886; and
- History of Bolton, completed by W. Pimblett, and issued in 1892.

Other writings included:

- Notes on Turton Tower and its successive Owners, 1880; with Supplementary Notes, 1881.
- Documentary Notes relating to Turton, 1882.
- Genealogy of the Knowles Family, 1886.

Scholes made transcripts of the Bolton parish registers from 1587 to 1860, which were printed to 1712 in the Bolton Weekly Journal, 1887–90.

== Notes ==
Attribution

This article incorporates text from a publication now in the public domain: Sutton, Charles William (1897). "Scholes, James Christopher". In Lee, Sidney (ed.). Dictionary of National Biography. Vol. 50. London: Smith, Elder & Co.
