= Malcolm Scholes =

- Born: 17 October 1924; Wakefield
- Died: 11 November 2008 (aged 84)
- Military career
- Allegiance: United Kingdom
- Branch: British Army; Royal Air Force
- Service years: 1944–1978
- Rank: Wing Commander
- Unit: Bomber Command
- Awards: Distinguished Flying Medal
- Other work: RAF recruiting organisation

Wing Commander Malcolm Scholes (17 October 1924 – 11 November 2008) was a British Royal Air Force (RAF) pilot most notable for completing two tours of operations in World War II with Bomber Command's Pathfinder Force whilst still a teenager.

Scholes was educated at Wakefield Technical College. He joined the RAF on his 18th birthday. He completed 54 missions with Bomber Command during the Second World War, which saw his aircraft hit by flak 11 times. His citation for the DFM stated that he had "set an example of tenacity and enthusiasm to the rest of the squadron".

After World War II ended he was stationed in Palestine, and was appointed MBE in 1948 for "his distinguished service and his devotion to duty which has been far above the normal requirements of the service". He later served at RAF Biggin Hill and with the RAF Regiment. His last post was to recruit the next generation of RAF personnel, from which he retired in 1978.
