= Barwick-in-Elmet =

Village in West Yorkshire, England

Coordinates: 53.831152°N 1.394488°W

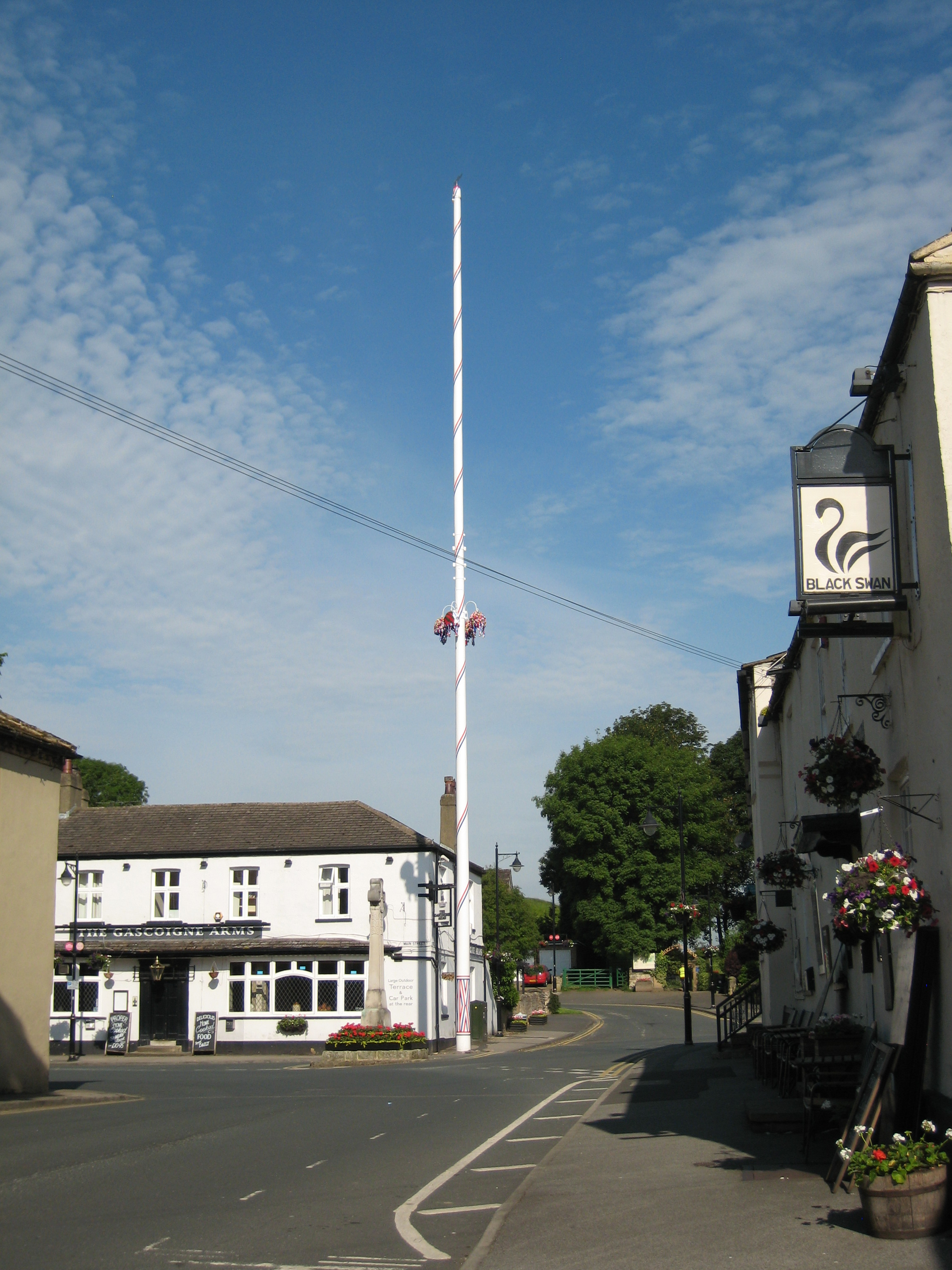
- Barwick Maypole, village cross, The Gascoigne Arms and The Black Swan

- Location within West Yorkshire
- OS grid reference: SE399373
- Civil parish: Barwick in Elmet and Scholes
- Metropolitan borough: City of Leeds
- Metropolitan county: West Yorkshire
- Region: Yorkshire and the Humber
- Country: England
- Sovereign state: United Kingdom
- Post town: LEEDS
- Postcode district: LS15
- Dialling code: 0113
- Police: West Yorkshire
- Fire: West Yorkshire
- Ambulance: Yorkshire
- UK Parliament: Wetherby and Easingwold

Barwick-in-Elmet (pronounced Barrick-in-Elmet) is a village in civil parish of Barwick in Elmet and Scholes, in the Leeds district, in West Yorkshire, England, 7 miles (11 km) east of Leeds city centre. It is one of many places in the area to be explicitly associated with the ancient Brythonic Kingdom of Elfed, the others being Scholes-in-Elmet and Sherburn-in-Elmet, while other Medieval records also show the "-in-Elmet" suffix was once used for other nearby settlements like Clifford, Micklefield, Sutton, Kirkby Wharfe, Burton Salmon and Saxton, though the current modern names dropped the suffix.

The village is part of the Harewood ward of Leeds City Council.

== Etymology ==
The name Barwick comes from the Old English words bere ('barley') and wīc ('settlement, specialised farm'), thus meaning 'a barley farm' or 'an outlying grange or part on an estate reserved for the lord's use, producing barley'. The name is first attested in the Domesday Book of 1086 as Bereuuith and Bereuuit. The appellation 'in Elmet' serves to distinguish the settlement from the various others of the same name. The first attested appellation of this kind for Barwick-in-Elmet is in fact the Latin Berewyke juxta Abberford ('Barwick-by-Aberford') from 1301. The combination Berewyke in Elmet is first attested in 1329.

== History ==
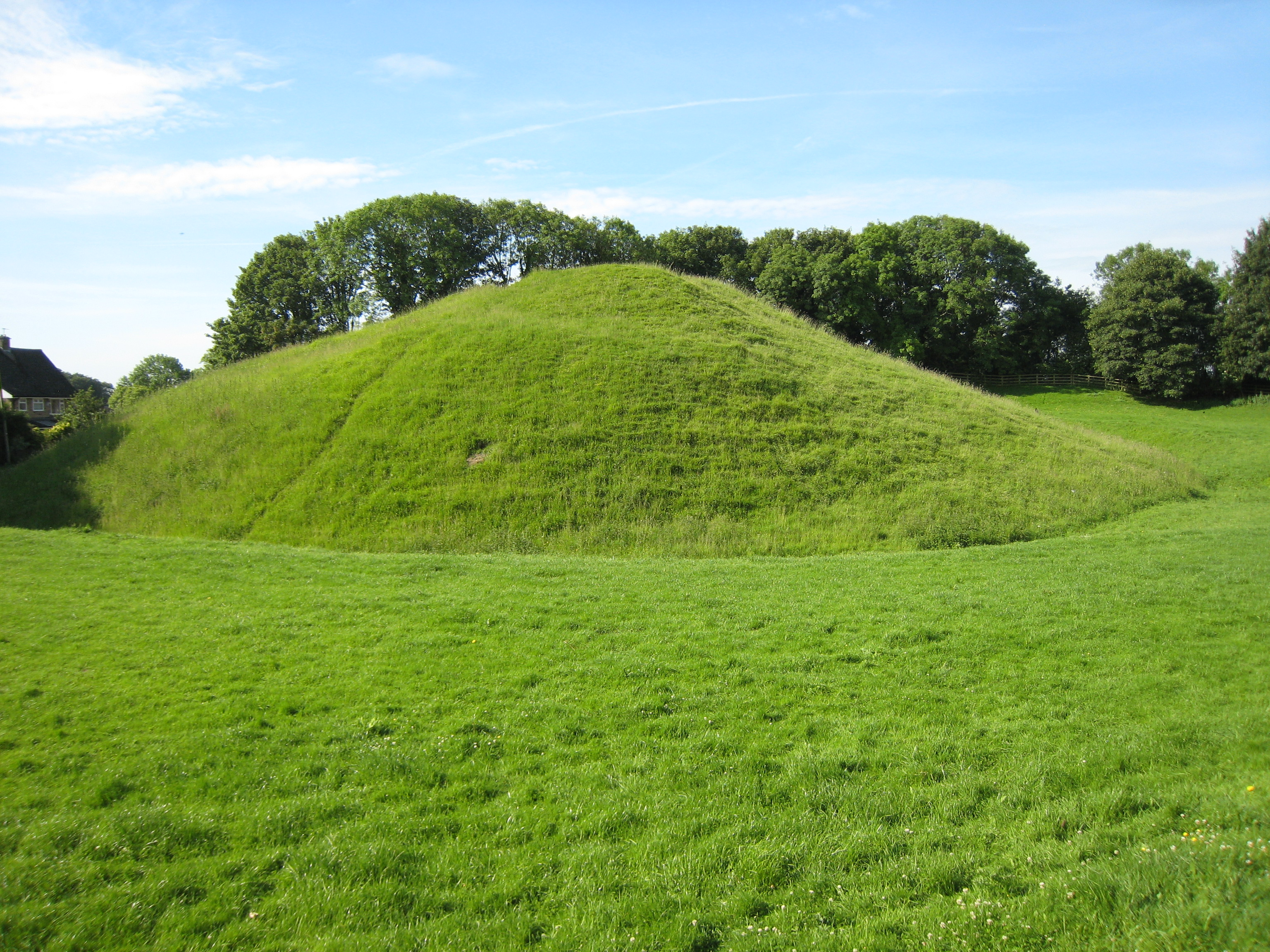
Hall Tower Hill.

Earthworks, including a mound and ditch, comprise part of a large Iron Age fort centred on Wendel Hill, near the village. The site was used later for a Norman motte-and-bailey castle and a Second World War observation post. The land is currently owned by the Barwick and Scholes Parish Council for the benefit of the community.

An ancient British kingdom named Elmet (Welsh Elfed) included the area. Some scholars believe that the capital of the kingdom was at or close to Barwick.

There is reference to an agricultural settlement in the Domesday Book of 1086. From a taxation survey, it is known that in 1379 there were 197 adults living in about 100 households.

For some time the Manor of Barwick and Scholes was in the ownership of the Gascoigne family of Parlington and Lotherton.

In 1720, the first known school in Barwick in Elmet opened. Morwick Hall was built in the mid to late 18th century for Edward Gray, who was Lord Mayor of Leeds in 1749 and 1768.

By 1821, the parish had a population of 1,481.

The Cross Gates to Wetherby railway line opened in 1874, with a station in nearby Scholes, enabling residents to commute to Leeds city centre. This service remained running until 1965, when the line closed under the Beeching Axe.

Throughout the 20th century, the village grew with many modern houses being built in and around the village by both private developers and the local corporations. During this period many of the older cottages in the village centre were converted into shops and other small business premises.

For much of its history, the village supported a mainly agricultural community. From the late 17th century until the early 20th century many residents were employed in the local mining industry in Garforth, Cross Gates and Whitkirk. Today, whilst still having a rural agricultural feel, the village supports many trades as well as housing for people who work in Leeds and York.

== Governance ==
Barwick-in-Elmet comes under the civil parish of Barwick and Scholes. This comes under the governance of Leeds City Council. Barwick is part of the Leeds City Council ward of Harewood. Barwick lies within the parliamentary constituency of Wetherby and Easingwold following the 2023 review of Westminster constituencies. Prior to this, Barwick lay within the constituency of Elmet and Rothwell. Since May 2010, the constituency has been held by the Conservative MP, Alec Shelbrooke.

== Maypole ==
One of the most notable village landmarks is the wooden maypole 86 feet (26 m) high that stands at the junction of Main Street and the Cross, this means that the maypole in Barwick is the tallest in the UK. The triennial maypole festival (held on Spring Bank Holiday) typically brings large crowds to the area. Every three years, the maypole is lowered, inspected, maintained and re-erected. The festival celebrations include a procession (involving floats decorated by local organisations), children's maypole dancing, morris dancing, a street craft market, the raising of the maypole ceremony and the maypole queen. Traditionally the maypole was lowered and raised manually using an intricate system of ropes and ladders. Although methods have changed in recent years, the maypole is still carried by hand from Hall Tower Hill to the heart of the village. During the raising ceremony, it is tradition for a local villager to climb halfway up the pole to disconnect the guide ropes. The climber is then spurred on by a large crowd to climb all the way to the top of the pole, to spin 'the fox' weather vane (a custom thought to bring good luck to the village). The festival takes place every 3 years, the most recent one being 29 May 2017. The date of one of the festivals had to be postponed twice due to coronavirus, and later took place on 2 June 2022.

Beside the maypole is what appears to be an old village cross, which is actually a memorial to the dead of the First World War, carved in the old fashioned style.

== Amenities ==
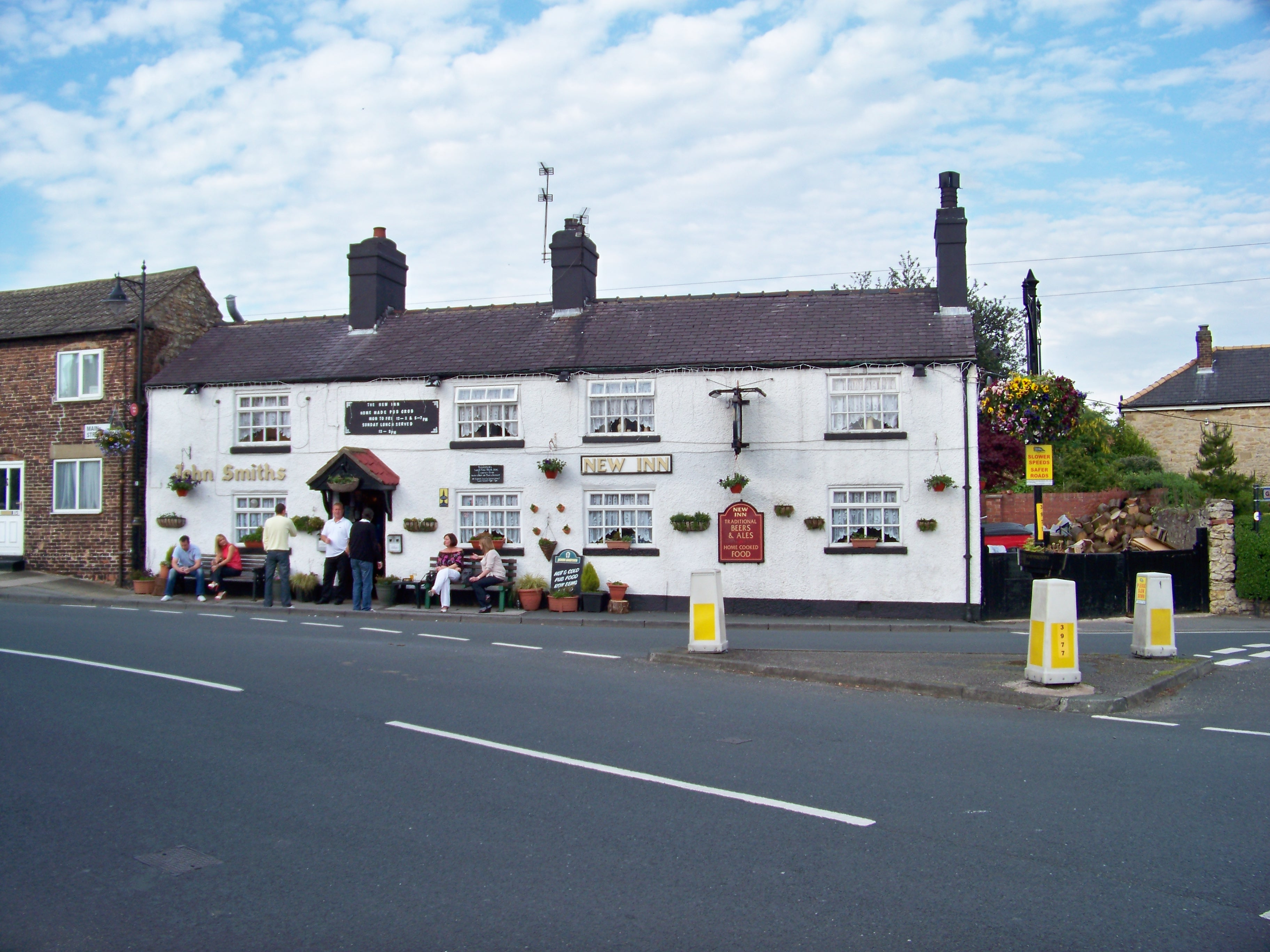
New Inn

Barwick has three public houses, the New Inn, the Black Swan and the Gascoigne Arms. There are two general stores (the larger one with a post office); a fish and chip shop; an Italian takeaway; a bicycle store; a florist's, baker's, hair and beauty salon and a car mechanics. There are further amenities in nearby Garforth, Cross Gates, Seacroft and Wetherby, all of which have supermarkets. There are nearby secondary schools in Pendas Fields, Garforth, Seacroft, Boston Spa and Wetherby.

== Places of worship ==
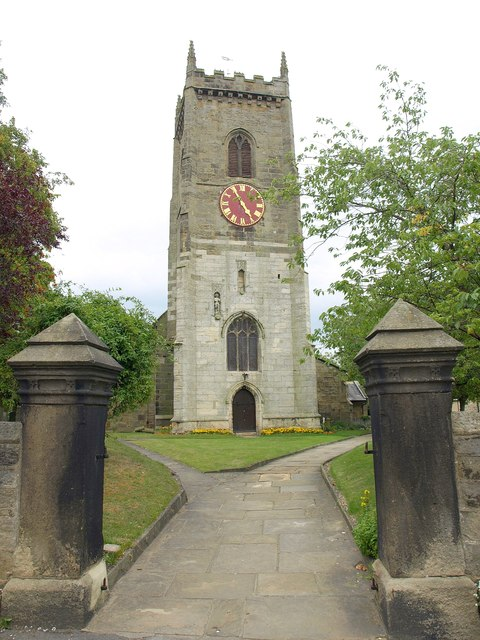
All Saints' Parish Church

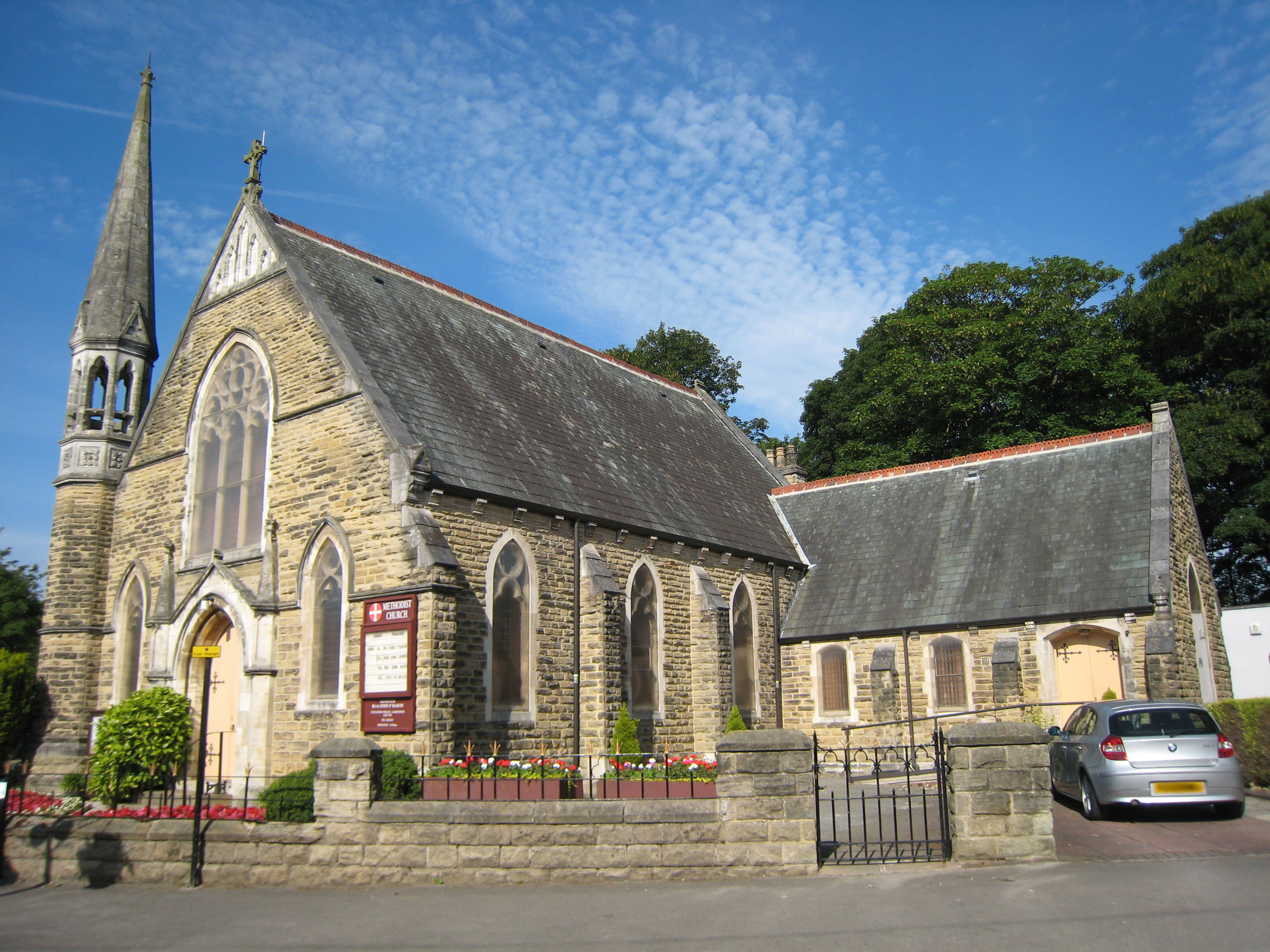
Methodist Church

There are two small churches, one Church of England and one Methodist. Barwick parish church is a grade II* listed building. It includes Anglo-Saxon and Norman stonework, with a 14th-century chancel and various later additions and alterations. The Unitarian minister Newcome Cappe was married here on 19 February 1788 on his second marriage to Catherine Cappe.

The Methodist church is a 1900 Wesleyan chapel close to the maypole and a street called the Boyle. It replaced an earlier 1804 building on Chapel Lane, which became the Miners' Welfare Institute, and is now used for communal activities.

== Local media ==
The local newspaper is the Wetherby News whilst the regional newspaper is the Yorkshire Evening Post. Local news and television programmes are provided by BBC Yorkshire and ITV Yorkshire. Television signals are received from the Emley Moor TV transmitter. Local radio stations BBC Radio Leeds, Greatest Hits Radio West Yorkshire, Hits Radio West Yorkshire, Heart Yorkshire, and Capital Yorkshire. There are cinemas nearby in Leeds, Wetherby and Castleford.

== Barwick in popular culture ==
The theme tune to The Archers is called "Barwick Green". It was written by Yorkshire composer Arthur Wood in 1924, as a "maypole dance" in his suite My Native Heath. The other items in this suite are "Ilkley Tarn", "Bolton Abbey" and "Knaresborough Status".

Widge, the protagonist in The Shakespeare Stealer, a 1998 young adult novel by Gary Blackwood, is from Barwick-in-Elmet.

== Other Barwicks ==
There are other villages in England called Barwick in Norfolk and Somerset, and a suburb of Stockton-on-Tees is called Ingleby Barwick. There is a town called Barwick in Georgia in the USA.

== Comparison ==
Barwick lies in the LS15 postcode area. Here is a population breakdown of the postcode area in comparison with the UK population.

Category	LS15	UK average
Population density (people / sq mi)	43.2	24.9
Gender split (females / male)	1.05	1.05
Average commute	6.1 miles	8.73 miles
Average age	38	39
Home ownership	16%	16.9%
Student population	2.4%	4.4%
People in good health	69%	69%

== See also ==
- Listed buildings in Barwick in Elmet and Scholes
