= William L. Scholes =

American politician

W. L. (Bill) Scholes

Member of the Tennessee House of Representatives from the 10th district
- In office 1967–1970

Personal details
- Born: September 16, 1926 Paris, Tennessee
- Died: October 9, 2002 (aged 76)
- Spouse: Marie Porter Scholes
- Children: Peggy Scholes, Terry Scholes, Don Scholes, Cindy Scholes Baker
- Education: University of Tennessee
- Occupation: Dentist

William L. "Bill" Scholes (September 16, 1926 – October 9, 2002), was an American politician in the state of Tennessee. Scholes served in the Tennessee House of Representatives as a Democrat from the 10th District from 1967 to 1970. A native of Paris, Tennessee, he was a dentist and veteran of the Korean War and World War II. He is an alumnus of University of Tennessee (DDS) and Memphis State University. During his time in the House of Representatives, he resided in Nashville, Tennessee.
