= Barwick in Elmet and Scholes =

Civil parish in West Yorkshire, England

Coordinates: 53.8227°N 1.4126°W

- Civil parish
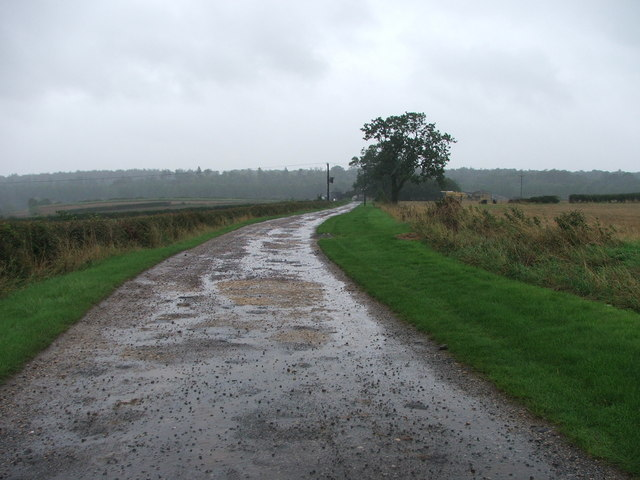
- Highfield Lane, Barwick-in-Elmet

- Location within West Yorkshire
- Population: 4,902 (2011 census)
- OS grid reference: SE387364
- Civil parish: Barwick in Elmet and Scholes
- Metropolitan borough: City of Leeds
- Metropolitan county: West Yorkshire
- Region: Yorkshire and the Humber
- Country: England
- Sovereign state: United Kingdom
- Post town: Leeds
- Postcode district: LS15
- Police: West Yorkshire
- Fire: West Yorkshire
- Ambulance: Yorkshire
- UK Parliament: Wetherby and Easingwold
- Website: Barwick in Elmet and Scholes Parish Council

Barwick in Elmet and Scholes is a civil parish in the City of Leeds metropolitan borough in West Yorkshire, England. According to the 2001 census it had a population of 5,120, decreasing to 4,902 at the 2011 Census. The parish includes Barwick-in-Elmet and Scholes, situated in the north-eastern part of the borough.

The parish council usually meets monthly.

== See also ==
- Listed buildings in Barwick in Elmet and Scholes
