= Scholes, Leeds =

Village in West Yorkshire, England

Coordinates: 53.826111°N 1.429167°W

Scholes-in-Elmet
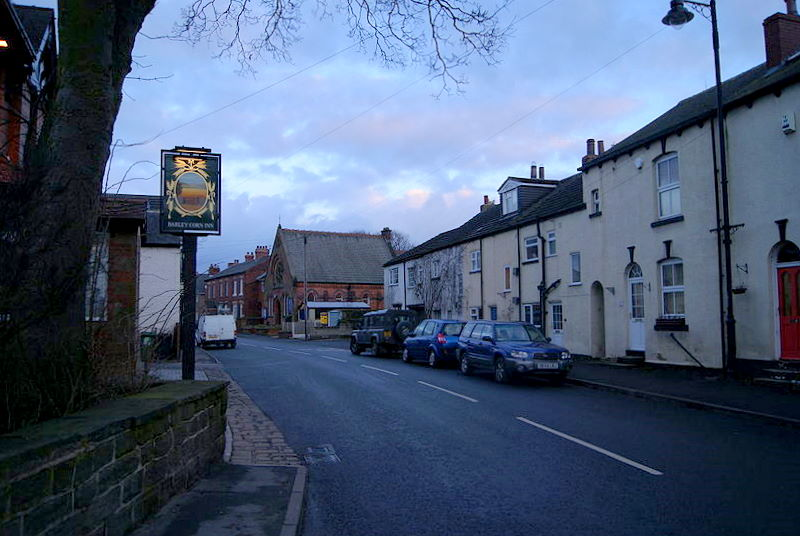
- Main Street, Scholes

- Location within West Yorkshire
- Population: 2,266
- OS grid reference: SE 37766 37254
- Metropolitan borough: City of Leeds
- Metropolitan county: West Yorkshire
- Region: Yorkshire and the Humber
- Country: England
- Sovereign state: United Kingdom
- Post town: LEEDS
- Postcode district: LS15
- Dialling code: 0113
- Police: West Yorkshire
- Fire: West Yorkshire
- Ambulance: Yorkshire
- UK Parliament: Wetherby and Easingwold

Scholes-in-Elmet is a village in Leeds, West Yorkshire, England. Its name is a plural of Old Norse skáli meaning "temporary shed".

It is sometimes known as Scholes-in-Elmet to distinguish it from the villages of the same name in the Holme Valley and Cleckheaton, also by analogy with the neighbouring village of Barwick-in-Elmet and Sherburn in Elmet.

The village is part of the civil parish of Barwick in Elmet and Scholes, sits in the Harewood ward of Leeds City Council and Wetherby and Easingwold parliamentary constituency. In 2011, the population of Scholes was 2,266.

== History ==
In the 1800s, Colonel Frederick Trench-Gascoigne (of Parlington Hall, Aberford) owned and rented out a large number of houses, mines, woodlands and farming land in the areas of Scholes, Swarcliffe, Barnbow, Garforth, Barwick-in-Elmet, Cross Gates, and Whinmoor.

In the mid-1880s, a previous occupant of the Seacroft windmill, Isaac Chippindale, started the Scholes Brick and Tile Works on Wood Lane, on the border to Swarcliffe. The company's quarry produced high-quality bricks with which many houses in the surrounding area were built. Its kilns and house were demolished in the early 1980s, leaving two small fishing lakes, but is still known as "Chippy's Quarry".

== Amenities ==
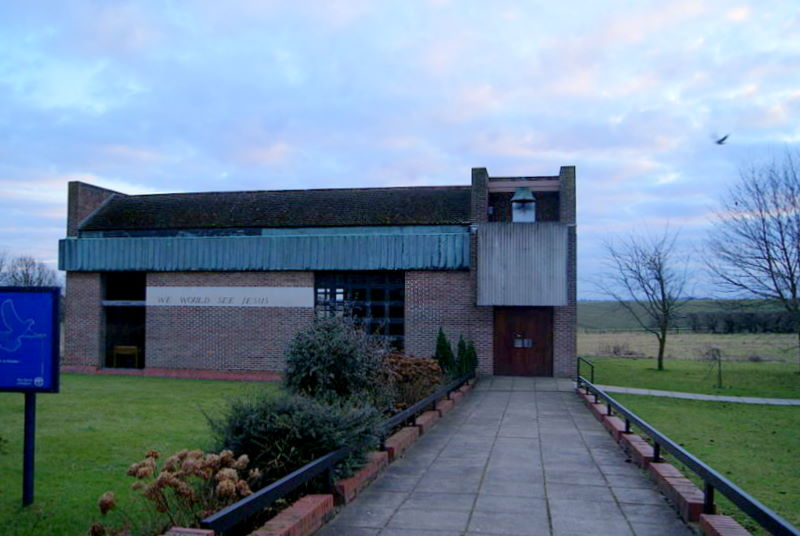
St Philip's church

Scholes has two pubs, a dentist and doctors, a hairdressers and beauty salon, a library and two churches. The nearest commercial centres are in Seacroft, the Springs (Barnbow) and Cross Gates. The Seacroft Green shopping centre contains amongst other shops a large Tesco supermarket, while the Cross Gates Shopping Centre (formerly an Arndale Centre) contains many high street shops. Other nearby commercial centres include Garforth and Wetherby.

The Barley Corn is a historic Samuel Smith Old Brewery pub on Main Street, while the former railway station on Station Road (The Buffers) has been converted into a pub and restaurant.

== Transport ==
Scholes lies close to the Leeds Outer Ring Road, the A64 and the M1. The East Leeds Orbital Road, due for completion in late 2022, will also serve the village. Scholes railway station was opened in 1876, part of the Cross Gates to Wetherby line; the station and line closed in 1964. Local bus services are 64 and 11, provided by First West Yorkshire. The nearest international airport is Leeds Bradford Airport, which is 12.4 miles (20 km).

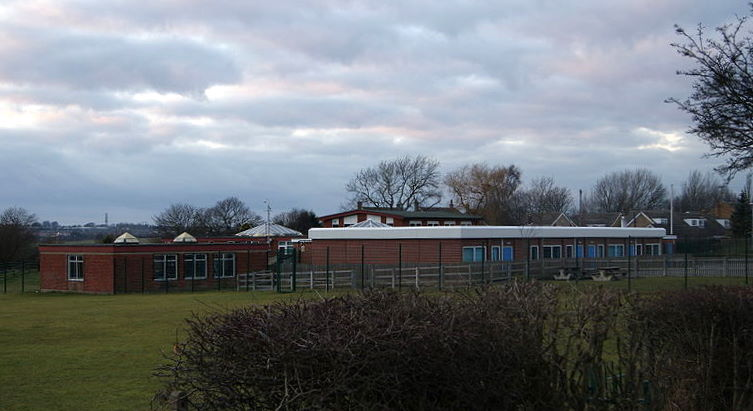
Scholes Junior School

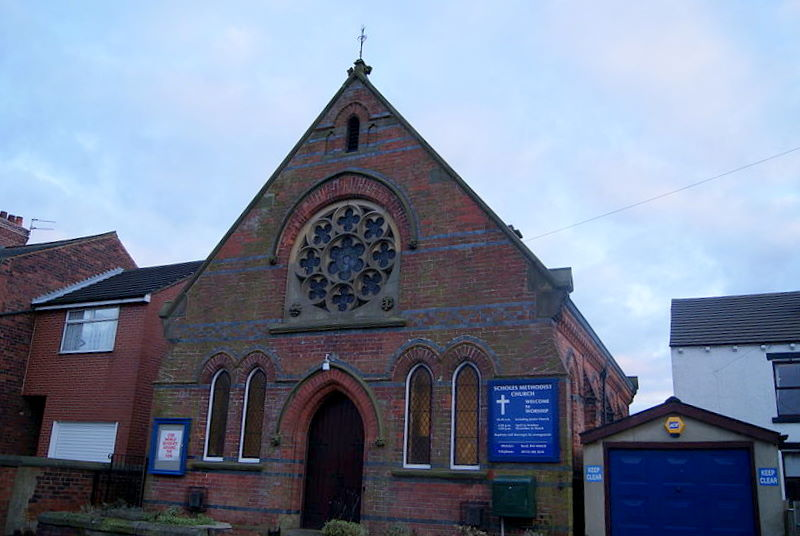
Scholes Methodist Church

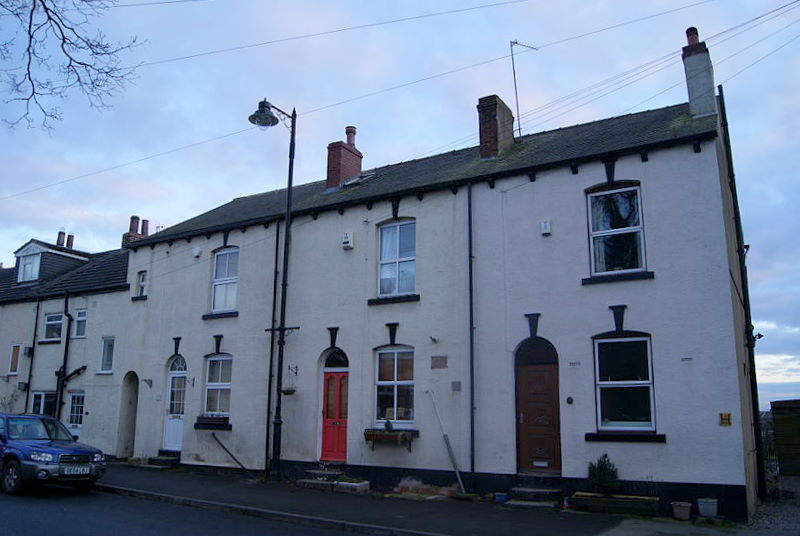
Houses on Main Street

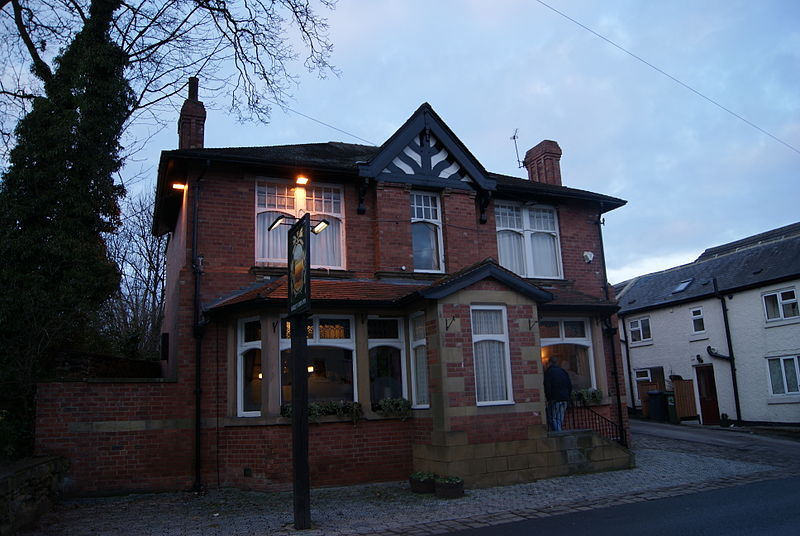
Barley Corn Inn

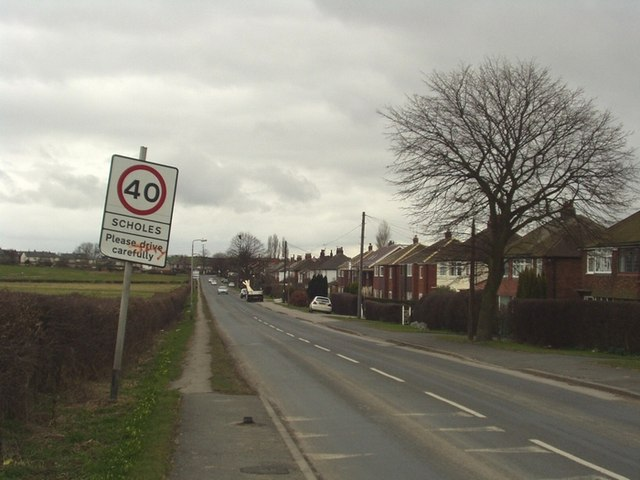
Leeds Road

== Comparison ==
Scholes is in the LS15 postcode area.

Category	LS15	UK average
Population density (people / sq mi)	43.2	24.9
Gender split (females / male)	1.05	1.05
Average commute	6.1 miles	8.73 miles
Average age	38	39
Home ownership	16%	16.9%
Student population	2.4%	4.4%
People in good health	69%	69%

== Location grid ==
=== Climate ===
The climate in Scholes is moderate.

Climate data for East Leeds (2011)
Month	Jan	Feb	Mar	Apr	May	Jun	Jul	Aug	Sep	Oct	Nov	Dec	Year
Mean daily maximum °C (°F)	8 (46)	9 (48)	11 (52)	13 (55)	17 (63)	19 (66)	22 (72)	22 (72)	18 (64)	14 (57)	10 (50)	7 (45)	14 (58)
Mean daily minimum °C (°F)	2.0 (35.6)	3.0 (37.4)	4.0 (39.2)	5.0 (41.0)	7.0 (44.6)	10.0 (50.0)	13.0 (55.4)	13.0 (55.4)	10.0 (50.0)	7.0 (44.6)	4.0 (39.2)	2.0 (35.6)	6.7 (44.0)
Average precipitation mm (inches)	41 (1.6)	46 (1.8)	40 (1.6)	55 (2.2)	43 (1.7)	61 (2.4)	46 (1.8)	44 (1.7)	55 (2.2)	65 (2.6)	62 (2.4)	69 (2.7)	627 (24.7)
Source: World Weather

== See also ==
- Listed buildings in Barwick in Elmet and Scholes
