= Stanley, West Yorkshire =

Village in West Yorkshire, England

Coordinates: 53.714539°N 1.47603°W

Stanley
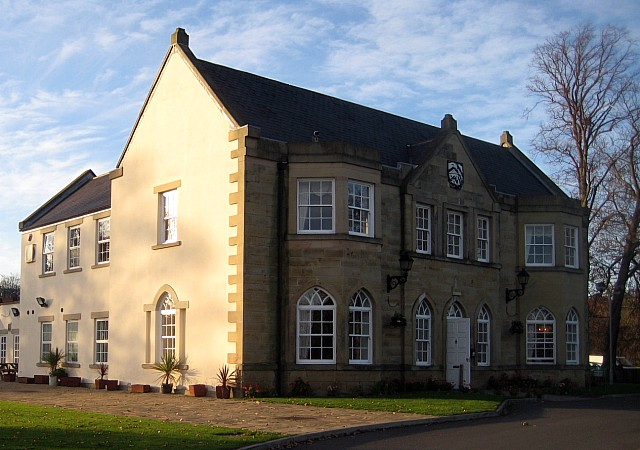
- The Grade II listed Hatfeild Hall, built 1598–1608

- Location within West Yorkshire
- Population: 15,314 (Ward. Stanley and Outwoods East)
- OS grid reference: SE347343
- Metropolitan borough: City of Wakefield
- Metropolitan county: West Yorkshire
- Region: Yorkshire and the Humber
- Country: England
- Sovereign state: United Kingdom
- Post town: WAKEFIELD
- Postcode district: WF3
- Dialling code: 01924
- Police: West Yorkshire
- Fire: West Yorkshire
- Ambulance: Yorkshire
- UK Parliament: Morley and Outwood

Stanley is a village in the Metropolitan Borough of Wakefield in West Yorkshire, England. It is about 2.5 miles (4.0 km) north-east of Wakefield city centre. Stanley was an Urban District in the West Riding of Yorkshire before 1974, being made up the four electoral wards of Lake Lock, Outwood, Stanley and Wrenthorpe. The Lofthouse / Stanley area of West Yorkshire has a combined population of 22,947. The ward remaining at the 2011 Census was called Stanley and Outwood East. The population of this ward at the 2011 Census was 15,314.

The name Stanley derives from the Old English stānlēah meaning 'stone wood/clearing'.

== Geography and amenities ==
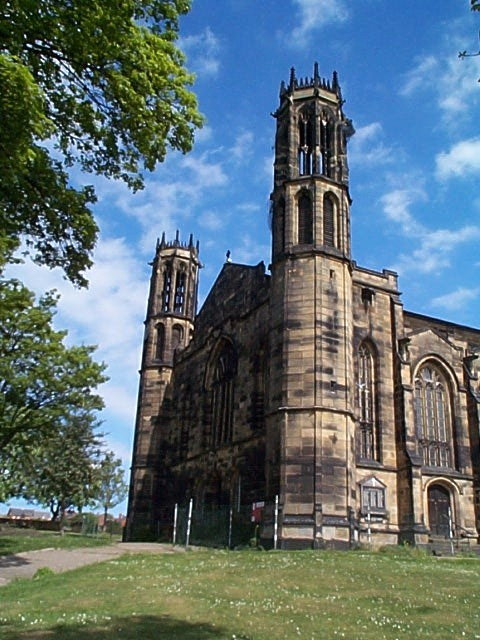
The former St Peter's church

Stanley's physical footprint is larger than that of its parent City Wakefield. Whilst often considered being a village, Stanley consists of the main village and neighbouring areas including Stanley Ferry, Lee Moor, part of the City Fields development and Lane Ends which is often perceived as the "village" centre.

Bottom Boat is considered part of Stanley, although it was counted as a separate place by the 2011 United Kingdom census.

The area has a number of commercial premises and corner-shops. It has a few pubs including The Wheatsheaf, Stanley Ferry and The Travellers and is also home to St Peters School, Stanley Grove School, Kingsland School, Stanley Surgery and a large community centre/library. Stanley has a fish and chip shops and a few other takeaway food outlets.

Stanley is home to the Stanley Marsh nature reserve which is a site consisting of varied terrain including a lake. The reserve is situated on the site of a former colliery, (see Lake Lock Rail Road).

The Anglican parish church, St Peter's, a large dominant building, was constructed in 1822 at a cost of £12,000 and opened on 6 September 1824. It was demolished in 2014. A landscaped public garden was built along with the resiting of the war memorial and a pit wheel commemorating the local miners.

== Sports ==
Stanley also plays host to the Stanley Falcons, a successful cricket team who play in Division One of the Central Yorkshire Cricket League. Stanley Rangers ARLFC, an amateur rugby league team who play in National Conference League Division Two.

Stanley Rodillians RUFC Ltd is based at Manley Park on Lee Moor Road and currently play in the Yorkshire 4 league.

Following the collapse of a previous project for a new stadium in 2009, which was partly to be built on the site of the former Newmarket colliery, due to an objection by Leeds City Council regarding use of greenbelt land, Wakefield Trinity were (planning permission permissive) looking to move to a new stadium by 2015.

A golf course is built on the former grounds of the grade II listed Hatfeild Hall [sic] and the former hall buildings serve as a clubhouse to Normanton golf club and an event location. The Mulberry tree in the grounds of Hatfeild Hall is rumoured to be the one from which a cutting was taken and planted inside the exercise area of Wakefield Gaol, which gave rise to the rhyme "Here We Go Round the Mulberry Bush".

== See also ==
- Listed buildings in Stanley and Outwood East
