= Scholes, Bradford =

Hamlet in West Yorkshire, England

Coordinates: 53.8408°N 1.9751°W

Scholes
- Pickles Hill

- Location within West Yorkshire
- Civil parish: Keighley
- Metropolitan borough: Bradford
- Metropolitan county: West Yorkshire
- Region: Yorkshire and the Humber
- Country: England
- Sovereign state: United Kingdom
- Police: West Yorkshire
- Fire: West Yorkshire
- Ambulance: Yorkshire

Scholes is a hamlet on Oldfield Lane and Hob Cote Lane, in the civil parish of Keighley, in the City of Bradford district, in the county of West Yorkshire, England. Nearby settlements include the town of Keighley, the village of Oakworth and the hamlet of Oldfield.
