= Listed buildings in Holme Valley (outer areas) =

Holme Valley is a civil parish in the metropolitan borough of Kirklees, West Yorkshire, England. It contains 450 listed buildings that are recorded in the National Heritage List for England. Of these, one is listed at Grade II*, the middle of the three grades, and the others are at Grade II, the lowest grade. Holme Valley is a large parish to the south of Huddersfield, and is largely rural. The largest settlement is the small town of Holmfirth, and smaller settlements include Honley and Brockholes to the north, and New Mill, Totties, Jackson Bridge, Hepworth, Hade Edge and Burnlee to the east and south.

Until the Industrial Revolution the economy of the parish depended mainly on agriculture, and many of the listed buildings are farmhouses and farm buildings. The Industrial Revolution brought the woollen industry to the area, and this was initially a domestic process. A high proportion of the listed buildings are weavers' cottages and other houses used for spinning wool, and these are characterised by long rows of mullioned windows, mainly in the upper storeys, and containing as many as 14 lights. Most of the listed buildings are constructed from stone, in particular millstone grit, and have roofs of stone slate. The other listed buildings include churches, chapels and associated structures, items in churchyards, schools, public houses, shops, bridges over the River Holme and its tributaries, a pinfold, monuments, including a war memorial, milestones and mileposts, boundary markers, a civic hall, remaining parts of corn and woollen mills, a pair of wells and a pair of stone troughs, a cinema, and telephone kiosks.

This list contains the listed buildings in the areas outside the town of Holmfirth, and includes the villages of Brockholes, Hade Edge, Hepworth, Honley, Jackson Bridge, New Mill, and Totties. The listed buildings in and near Holmfirth are included in Listed buildings in Holme Valley (central area).

== Key ==
Grade	Criteria
II*	Particularly important buildings of more than special interest
II	Buildings of national importance and special interest

== Buildings ==
Name and location	Photograph	Date	Notes	Grade
Cruck Building, Carr Farm; 53.55737°N 1.75593°W		14th century or earlier	A cruck framed barn, the stone walls date from the 17th century. It has a stone slate roof, and is a long low building with one storey. The openings date from later, and have been altered. Inside the northern part are two full cruck trusses.	II
Croft House Farm Barn; 53.56601°N 1.76182°W	—	16th century or earlier	The barn has a timber framed core with cruck construction, and was encased in stone in the 17th or early 18th century. It has quoins, a stone slate roof, and an outshut. Opposite the main entrance is a rear entrance with a chamfered surround and a timber lintel. Inside, the crucks have been altered.	II
Building adjoining 45 Upper Oldfield; 53.58796°N 1.80060°W	—	17th century or earlier	The building is cruck framed, and it was enclosed in millstone grit in the early 18th century. There is some early brickwork, a stone slate roof, two storeys, and one bay. In the ground floor is a four-light double-chamfered mullioned window, and the upper floor contains a mullioned window with an oak lintel. Inside, there are two large full cruck trusses.	II
Barn, Bank End; 53.59054°N 1.76487°W	—	17th century or earlier	The barn, which is at right angles to the house, has a timber framed core, and was encased in stone with quoins in the 18th century. The roof is of stone slate with coped gables and moulded kneelers. On each side are large quoined openings. The timber-framed core has three bays, and there are extensions at both ends.	II
Barn, Brianfield Farmhouse; 53.57427°N 1.73349°W	—	17th century or earlier	A cruck framed barn that was enclosed in stone with quoins in the 18th century. It has a stone slate roof with some sheeting, there are outshuts to the south and later lean-to extensions. Inside, there are three cruck trusses.	II
Ings Lodge; 53.54496°N 1.84871°W	—	17th century	The house, which has been partly rebuilt, is in stone with a plinth at the rear, a stone slate roof, and two storeys. The original doorway, which has a rough triangular head, has been converted into a window, and there is a later doorway to the left. The windows are mullioned, some have been re-set, and there is a fire window at the rear.	II
Upperfold Farmhouse; 53.55010°N 1.83913°W	—	17th century	The farmhouse, which was altered in the 19th century, is in rendered stone with quoins, a stone slate roof with coped gables and moulded kneelers, and two storeys. The original doorway is partly blocked, and has chamfered reveals and a Tudor arch, and the later doorway is to the left. To its left is a mullioned and transomed window, to the right is a two-light window with a mullion, and in the upper floor are five single-light windows, At the rear are mullioned windows and a small staircase window.	II
112 and 124 Hall Ing, Honley; 53.60338°N 1.77174°W	—	1663	A pair of stone houses, part of a group, with quoins and a stone slate roof with a coped gable on moulded kneelers to the west. There are two storeys and three bays. The original doorway has a deep lintel and a datestone above. The windows vary; one is mullioned and transomed, others are mullioned, some mullions have been removed, and there is a cross window.	II
Barn northwest of 5 and 6 Barnside; 53.55037°N 1.74303°W	—	1674	The barn is in stone with quoins and a stone slate roof with finials. In the centre is an outshut containing two doorways with deep arched lintels, one with a carved inscription, initials and a date, and flanking the outshut are carriage entrances. In the left gable end is a doorway with a chamfered surround an arched lintel and a keystone, and a partly blocked doorway with a shaped dated and initialled lintel.	II
33, 35, 37 and 39 Totties Lane, Totties; 53.57045°N 1.76414°W	—	1684	A house, later divided, it is in millstone grit, with a stone slate roof that has gables with chamfered coping, moulded kneelers, and small parapets. There are two storeys and attics, and a symmetrical H-shaped plan, consisting of a three-bay hall range and projecting gabled cross-wings, and at the rear are single-story extensions. All the windows are double-chamfered, most are mullioned, and there are also cross windows and single-light windows. In the centre is a doorway with an arched initialled lintel, and over the windows are continuous hood moulds. At the rear is a porch with a parapet and a doorway with a shaped dated lintel. Adjacent to this is an entrance with a deep arched lintel and a canopy with a moulded support.	II*
5 St Mary's Square, Honley; 53.60518°N 1.79311°W		1685	The house at the end of a row is in stone with quoins, and a gable with chamfered coping on square kneelers. There are two storeys and an attic, one wide gabled bay, and a narrow recessed passage bay to the left. The main doorway has a moulded surround, and a massive arched lintel inscribed with initials and the date. In the ground and upper floor are twelve-light mullioned and transomed windows, in the upper floor is also a cross window, and in the attic is a three-light mullioned window. The passage bay contains a doorway with a chamfered surround and a deep arched lintel, and above it is a cross window. All the windows have hood moulds.	II
Entrance to playground, Holme; 53.55003°N 1.83864°W		1686	A doorway, reset as an entrance arch, it is in millstone grit. The entrance is flanked by quoins, and it has a large triangular Tudor arched lintel inscribed with initials and the date.	II
Former dwellings and barn to right of 42 Barracks Fold; 53.55663°N 1.75506°W		1691	The buildings are in stone with quoins, a stone slate roof, and two storeys. The dwellings contain a doorway with a deep Tudor arched lintel inscribed with initials and a date, and there is another doorway to the right. The windows are double-chamfered and mullioned, with some mullions removed. The barn to the right contains a large central doorway with a timber lintel and a hood mould, and to the right is a smaller doorway with chamfered reveals and a deep lintel. In the gable apex is an inscribed and dated opening.	II
10, 12 and 14 Church Street, Honley; 53.60454°N 1.79254°W		1692	A house with an attached cottage, later three dwellings, it is in millstone grit on a plinth, and has a stone slate roof with chamfered gable copings on carved kneelers. There are two storeys and a one-bay rear wing. The original main doorway had a moulded surround, and a deep initialled and dated lintel, and above it is a circular window. The other windows are sashes, in the ground floor they are mullioned, and there is a continuous hood mould over the ground floor openings. At the rear are two doorways, one with a moulded surround and an arched head, and above it is a circular window.	II
67 Corn Hey, Holme; 53.54898°N 1.83844°W	—	17th or early 18th century	A farmhouse that was later altered and extended, it is in stone with quoins, and a stone slate roof with chamfered gable copings on moulded kneelers. There are two storeys, and the windows are mullioned, with some mullions removed, and some windows have hood moulds.	II
14 and 15 Wood Bottom Road, Honley; 53.60642°N 1.81231°W		17th or early 18th century	A pair of mirror-image houses in rendered stone with a stone slate roof. There are two storeys, on the north front are two central doorways, and the windows are mullioned.	II
Bank End; 53.59068°N 1.76476°W	—	17th or early 18th century	A large farmhouse later divided into four, it is in rendered stone with quoins and a stone slate roof with chamfered gable copings on carved kneelers. There are two storeys, an attic and three bays, and an extension to the west. All the windows are double chamfered and most have mullions.	II
Lower Spout Farmhouse; 53.54923°N 1.83837°W	—	17th or early 18th century	The farmhouse is in stone, partly rendered, with quoins, a stone slate roof, and two storeys. The doorway is in the gable end and has a Tudor arched head. Most of the windows are mullioned, some mullions have been removed, and there is a fire window and a single-light window.	II
Moor View Farmhouse; 53.58095°N 1.73670°W		17th or early 18th century	The east part of the farmhouse was rebuilt in the 19th century. It is in rendered stone, and has a stone slate roof with chamfered gable copings. There are two storeys, and on the front is a partly blocked doorway with a deep lintel and a later doorway to the right. The windows are mullioned, some mullions have been removed, and some lights have been blocked.	II
Barn, Upper Fold Farm; 53.54995°N 1.83911°W	—	17th or early 18th century	The barn is in rendered stone with quoins, a stone slate roof, and outshut extensions. In the centre of the front is a doorway, and the rear has a blocked central door with a chamfered surround and lintel.	II
White House; 53.56521°N 1.76067°W	—	17th or early 18th century	The house, which has been altered, is in rendered stone, and has a tile roof with chamfered gable copings on moulded kneelers. There are two storeys, and a central gabled porch with a deep arched lintel. Some windows are chamfered, the mullions have been removed, and some hood moulds remain.	II
Wickleden; 53.55363°N 1.76800°W	—	17th or early 18th century	The house, which has been altered and extended, is in stone with quoins, moulded brackets, a stone slate roof with carved kneelers, and two storeys. The doorway has a Tudor arched lintel, and most of the windows are mullioned. The rear of the house has been largely rebuilt.	II
13/14 and 15 (part) Upper Gate and barns, Hepworth; 53.55764°N 1.75684°W		Early 18th century	A group of farm buildings in stone with quoins and moulded brackets, and stone slate roofs with chamfered gable copings on carved kneelers. The dwellings have two storeys, they are at right angles to each other, and contain mullioned windows, a staircase window, a canted bay window, and ventilation slits. The adjoining barn has two opposing segmental-arched entries, and the barn to the south contains two small doorways with Tudor arches.	II
59–67 Totties Lane, Totties; 53.57000°N 1.76333°W		Early 18th century	A row of cottages that was extended in the late 18th century, and the upper floor windows replaced in the 19th century. They are in stone with quoins, stone slate roofs, and two storeys. The windows are mullioned, and in the upper floor of No. 61 is a nine-light window.	II
68 Totties Lane, Totties; 53.56972°N 1.76312°W	—	Early 18th century	A stone house with quoins, a stone slate roof with chamfered gable copings on cut kneelers, and two storeys. In the centre is a doorway with a Tudor arch, and at the rear in the upper floor is another doorway with a Tudor arch and a chamfered surround. Most of the windows are mullioned, and in the top floor on the front is a former ten-light window with the middle four lights blocked.	II
Bank Bottom Farmhouse and Barn; 53.54906°N 1.78876°W	—	Early 18th century	The farmhouse and barn are in stone with quoins and a stone slate roof. The house has two storeys, an extension to the left, and a later lean-to extension, and contains a porch and mullioned windows. The barn on the right has a segmental-arched doorway, and an extension with a catslide roof to the right.	II
Barn south of Carr Farm; 53.55720°N 1.75592°W		Early 18th century	The barn, with an outshut added later, is in stone with quoins and a stone slate roof. It contains double-chamfered windows and a Tudor arched doorway.	II
Building at rear of 14 Church Street, Honley; 53.60465°N 1.79251°W		Early 18th century	A stone building on a plinth, with quoins, and a stone slate roof with coped gables and carved kneelers. There are two storeys and two bays. In the centre are two doorways with quoined surrounds and massive lintels; the left doorway has chamfered reveals and the right doorway has a moulded surround. The windows are double chamfered and mullioned.	II
Building adjacent to 45 Upper Oldfield; 53.58792°N 1.80067°W	—	Early 18th century	The building is in millstone grit, and has a stone slate roof with chamfered gable copings and two storeys. The windows are mullioned, and some have hood moulds.	II
Daisy Lee; 53.54185°N 1.77188°W	—	Early 18th century	A detached stone house with quoins and a stone slate roof with coped gables and carved kneelers. There are two storeys, two bays, and a rear extension. The doorway is in the centre, and the windows are chamfered and mullioned, with some mullions removed.	II
Font, St Mary's Church, Honley; 53.60482°N 1.79292°W	—	Early 18th century (presumed)	The font in the churchyard was originally in an earlier chapel. It is in stone, and consists of an octagonal bowl on a pedestal and base. The bowl is inscribed with initials and a date.	II
The Olde House; 53.56303°N 1.77128°W	—	Early 18th century	The house, which was altered in the 20th century, is in millstone grit with quoins and a hipped slate roof. There are two storeys and two bays. The central doorway is recent, and there is a blocked doorway to the right. The windows are chamfere and mullioned, and have hood moulds.	II
Honley Mill; 53.60579°N 1.78937°W		Early to mid-18th century	Originally a corn and woollen watermill, it was extended in the 19th and 20th centuries, and has since been used for other purposes. It is in millstone grit and has modern roof coverings. The mill consists of a southern block with three storeys and a basement and seven bays, and an earlier northern block at right angles with two storeys and a basement.	II
Ivy Cottage; 53.56491°N 1.76199°W	—	Early to mid-18th century	The cottage at the end of a later row is in stone with quoins, a string course, and a stone slate roof with a coped gable on moulded kneelers. There are two storeys, two bays, an extension on the left, and a rear outshut. The doorway has a chamfered surround and an arched lintel, and the windows are mullioned.	II
Town Head Farmhouse and cottage 53.56445°N 1.76239°W	—	Early to mid-18th century	The farmhouse and cottage are in millstone grit with quoins, and a stone slate roof with coped gables and moulded kneelers. There are two storeys and the windows are mullioned. The cottage is to the right and has a single-storey extension.	II
Hawthorn House; 53.60524°N 1.79435°W		1741	A house and cottage, later combined, it is in stone with quoins, and a stone slate roof with a coped gable and shaped kneeler to the right. There are two storeys, three bays, and a projecting extension on the right. The doorway has a plain surround and a date plaque above, most of the windows are mullioned with some mullions removed, and there is an oval window on the front.	II
21 and 31 Butterley, New Mill; 53.56961°N 1.75062°W	—	1742	A house later divided into two, it is in stone with rusticated quoins, and a stone slate roof with coped gables and moulded kneelers with a scrolled pattern. There are two storeys and attics, and the two parts form an L-shaped plan, each part with a symmetrical front of three bays. No. 21 has a doorway with a decorative head and a small cornice, and sash windows with moulded surrounds. The doorway of No. 31 has a shaped, dated and initialled lintel, and the windows are a mix of sashes and casements.	II
32 and 33 Oldfield; 53.58894°N 1.79614°W	—	1742	A pair of mirror-image houses, they are in stone with quoins, and a stone slate roof with coped gables and moulded kneelers. There are two storeys, the doorways are in the centre, and above them is a dated and initialled plaque. The windows are mullioned, and each house has a two-light window in the ground floor and a four-light window in the upper floor.	II
5 and 6 Barnside; 53.55022°N 1.74268°W	—	Mid-18th century	A former farmhouse that was extended in the 19th century, it is in millstone grit, with quoins, a stone slate roof, and two storeys. The doorway has moulded reveals and a moulded Tudor arched lintel, and the windows are mullioned, some with hood moulds.	II
127 and 129 Dunford Road, Longley; 53.55908°N 1.77870°W	—	Mid-18th century	A pair of houses at the end of a terrace, they are in stone, the left house rendered, and a stone slate roof. There are two storeys, a lean-to on the left, and the windows are mullioned. On the front is a doorway with a deep lintel, and at the rear is a central blocked window with an arched head.	II
118 Hall Ing, Honley; 53.60347°N 1.77176°W	—	18th century	A stone house, part of a group, it was altered in the 19th century. The house has quoins, a stone slate roof, two storeys, and two bays. The windows date from the late 19th century and consist of a sash window above the doorway, and a two-light window in each floor.	II
122 Hall Ing, Honley; 53.60359°N 1.77199°W	—	18th century	A stone house, part of a group, it was altered in the 19th century. The house has quoins, a stone slate roof, two storeys, and one bay. The doorway has chamfered reveals and a massive lintel. To the left is a two-light mullioned window, and in the upper floor is a later window.	II
3 St Mary's Square, Honley; 53.60512°N 1.79323°W		18th century	A stone house in a terrace, with a stone slate roof, three storeys and two bays. In the centre is a doorway, the lower two floors contain sash windows, one with a mullion, and in the top floor is an eight-light mullioned window.	II
1 and 2 Hollin House, New Mill; 53.57192°N 1.74366°W	—	18th century	A stone house that has a stone slate roof with coped gables and kneelers. At the rear is a central doorway, and the windows are mullioned.	II
27 St George's Road, Scholes; 53.56605°N 1.76131°W	—	Mid-18th century	The house, which was extended in the 19th century with the addition of a further storey, is in stone with quoins, and a stone slate roof with chamfered coping and cut kneelers. There are three storeys, the doorway has a very deep lintel, and the windows are mullioned, including a seven-light window in the top floor.	II
45 Upper Oldfield; 53.58797°N 1.80055°W	—	18th century	The house is in millstone grit with a slate roof that has chamfered gable copings on carved kneelers. There are two storeys and a small lean-to extension. The entrance to the through passage is quoined and has chamfered reveals and a deep lintel. Most of the windows are mullioned and there are modern casements.	II
Barn opposite 58 Town Gate, Hepworth; 53.55681°N 1.75461°W		18th century	The barn is in stone with quoins and a stone slate roof. in the centre is a large doorway with a segmental arch, and in the south gable end is a smaller doorway with a deep lintel and later openings.	II
Barn northwest of Moor View Farmhouse; 53.58111°N 1.73680°W	—	18th century	The oldest part of the barn is to the south, with most of it dating from the early to mid-19th century. It is in stone with a stone slate roof, two storeys, and there is an outshut at the rear. To the north are large entrances with lintels, and ventilation holes. In the southern part is a small doorway with chamfered reveals and a deep lintel.	II
Barn, Town Head Farm; 53.56456°N 1.76216°W	—	18th century	A stone barn with quoins, a stone slate roof, and an outshut extension. On the front is a large central quoined doorway, and at the rear is a central doorway with a timber lintels.	II
Early Butts; 53.60856°N 1.79427°W	—	Mid-18th century	A pair of cottages at the end of a row, they are in stone with quoins and a stone slate roof. There are two storeys, and an outshut at the rear. The doorways are in the centre and have chamfered surrounds and massive lintels. The windows are chamfered and mullioned, with some mullions removed.	II
Lower Wood Royd Farmhouse; 53.54751°N 1.72989°W	—	Mid-18th century	The farmhouse, part of a group, is in rendered stone with a stone slate roof. There are two storeys, a rear outshut, and a central doorway with a deep Tudor arched lintel. To the right of the doorway is a sash window, and the other windows are mullioned with three lights.	II
Stocks, St Mary's Church; 53.60482°N 1.79304°W	—	18th century (or earlier)	The stocks are in the churchyard of St Mary's Church, Honley, and are in stone. They consist of upright sides with slots, and a bottom rail with four notches.	II
1 and 2 Exchange, Honley; 53.60460°N 1.79296°W		1751	A pair of mirror-image stone houses with rusticated quoins, a string course, moulded gutter brackets, and a stone slate roof with coped gables and moulded kneelers. There are two storeys, and the windows are mullioned. The doorways are in the centre and each has a moulded surround, a pulvinated frieze, and a cornice, and above them are initials and the date.	II
Reins Farm; 53.60778°N 1.78870°W	—	1754	A pair of mirror-image houses, part of a group, in stone with quoins, and a stone slate roof with gable copings on carved kneelers. There are three storeys and two central doorways with deep lintels, above which is a dated and initialled plaque. The windows are mullioned, with some mullions removed, and some lights blocked, and to the right is a later canted bay window.	II
24 and 26 Holme; 53.54989°N 1.83877°W	—	1762	A pair of houses in stone, partly rendered, with quoins and a stone slate roof. There are two storeys and an attic, and most of the windows are mullioned. On the northeast front is a porch, in the southwest gable end is a quoined doorway with a deep lintel, and in the gable apex is a datestone.	II
58 and 59A Town Gate, Hepworth; 53.55661°N 1.75461°W		Mid- to late 18th century	Two stone houses with quoins, a stone slate roof with coped gables on carved kneelers, and two storeys. No. 58 has a doorway with a very deep lintel and altered windows, and No. 59A has a central doorway with a deep slightly arched lintel, and mullioned windows with arched lights.	II
28 Oldfield; 53.58901°N 1.79572°W	—	1773	Two houses, later combined into one, it is in stone with quoins, and a stone slate roof with coped gables and carved kneelers. There are three storeys and an extension to the southwest. The windows are mullioned, with some blocked lights, there are two doorways, one partly blocked, and on the northwest front is an initialled and dated plaque.	II
7 and 8 Barnside; 53.55020°N 1.74249°W	—	Late 18th century	A pair of houses in a row, they are in stone, with quoins, moulded gutter brackets, and a stone slate roof. There are two storeys, and the windows are mullioned. The house to the left has a continuous twelve-light window in the upper floor, and in the house to the right are two-light windows in both floors.	II
34 Town Gate, Hepworth; 53.55795°N 1.75544°W		Late 18th century	A pair of mirror-image houses converted into a single dwelling, it is in stone with quoins, and a stone slate roof with coped gables and carved kneelers. There are three storeys and an extension to the west. In the centre are two doorways, the right one blocked, and the windows are mullioned with some mullions removed and some blocked lights.	II
27 Church Street, Honley; 53.60466°N 1.79304°W		Late 18th century	A stone house in a row, with quoins, a string course, a moulded eaves cornice, and a stone slate roof with coped gables. There are two storeys and a symmetrical front of five bays. The central doorway has a moulded surround, a fanlight, a frieze, and a cornice on consoles, and the windows are sashes.	II
28 and 30 Church Street, Honley; 53.60535°N 1.79385°W		Late 18th century	A pair of stone houses, partly rendered, with quoins, and a stone slate roof with coped gables and carved kneelers. There are two storeys, and on the front of No. 28 is a projecting lean-to extension. The windows are mullioned; No. 30 has a four-light window in each floor, and the windows of No. 28 have been altered.	II
29 Church Street, Honley; 53.60472°N 1.79310°W		Late 18th century	A stone house in a row, the ground floor is rendered, and it has string courses, a moulded eaves cornice, and a stone slate roof. There are three storeys and one bay. In the ground floor is a doorway and a single-light window, and in each of the upper floors is a three-light mullioned window.	II
2 and 4 Far End House, Honley; 53.60226°N 1.78830°W		Late 18th century	A pair of stone houses with quoins, and a stone slate roof with coped gables and carved kneelers. There are two storeys and an attic, and two doorways, one with a fanlight. Most of the windows are mullioned, there is a single-light window, a staircase window, Venetian windows in the gable ends, and a dormer in the roof.	II
6 Far End House, Honley; 53.60220°N 1.78853°W		Late 18th century	Possibly a coach house converted into dwellings, it is in stone with quoins, and a stone slate roof with coped gables and moulded kneelers. There are two storeys and an attic, and five bays. In the centre is a carriage entrance, partly blocked by a doorway, and above it is a partly blocked taking-in door. The outer bays contain sash windows, and in the gable ends are Venetian windows.	II
2, 3 and 4 France Fold, Honley; 53.60529°N 1.79358°W		Late 18th century	Part of a terrace, the houses are in stone with quoins and a stone slate roof. There are two storeys, three original doorways with deep lintels, and one later doorway. The windows in the ground floor have mainly been altered, and in the upper floor they are mullioned.	II
36, 38 and 40 Hall Ing Lane and barn, Honley; 53.60677°N 1.77911°W		Late 18th century	A row of houses and an attached barn, they are in stone with quoins, and a stone slate roof with a coped gable and kneelers to the barn. Both parts have doorways and mullioned windows, there are outshuts flanking the entrance to the barn, and in the barn are vents.	II
96 and 98 Hall Ing, Honley; 53.60372°N 1.77187°W	—	Late 18th century	A pair of stone houses, part of a group, with quoins, a stone slate roof, and two storeys. The entrance is at the rear, and the windows are mullioned, with some lights blocked.	II
100 Hall Ing, Honley; 53.60363°N 1.77191°W	—	Late 18th century	A stone house, part of a group, with quoins, a stone slate roof, and two storeys. The entrance is in the gable end, and the windows are mullioned with some lights blocked.	II
108 Hall Ing, Honley; 53.60351°N 1.77161°W	—	Late 18th century	A detached stone house with quoins and a stone slate roof. There are two storeys and an attic, one bay, and a lean-to the south. The windows are mullioned; on the front facing the road is a four-light window in the ground floor and a five-light window in the upper floor. The entrance is in the south front which also contains an attic window.	II
12 and 16 Magdale, Honley; 53.61001°N 1.79005°W		Late 18th century	Originally a mill, later converted for residential use, the building is in stone with quoins and moulded gutter brackets, and a stone slate roof, hipped to the south with coped gables and moulded kneelers. There are three storeys, and No. 12 has a symmetrical front of three bays. No. 16, to the south, has two large carriage entries, both partly blocked. Most of the windows in both parts are mullioned, and in the south front is a continuous twelve-light window.	II
49 and 51 Magdale, Honley; 53.61023°N 1.79083°W	—	Late 18th century	A pair of cottages in stone with quoins and a stone slate roof. There are two storeys, each cottage has one bay, and at the ends are single-storey lean-tos. On the front are porches, and the windows are mullioned.	II
2, 4, 6 and 8 Lower Fold, and 2, 4, 6 and 8 Eastgate, Honley; 53.60451°N 1.79106°W		Late 18th century	A group of back-to-back houses in stone, partly rendered, with quoins, moulded gutter brackets, and a stone slate roof with coped gables and moulded kneelers. There are two storeys, and the windows are mullioned.	II
4 and 6 New Street, Honley; 53.60421°N 1.79278°W		Late 18th century	A pair of mirror-image houses at the end of a terrace, they are in stone with quoins and a stone slate roof. There are two storeys and the windows are mullioned. Each house has a doorway and a two-light window in the ground floor, and a three-light window in the upper floor.	II
1 and 2 St Mary's Square, Honley; 53.60505°N 1.79333°W		Late 18th century	A pair of mirror-image houses in stone with quoins and a stone slate roof with a coped gable on the left. There are three storeys, and each house has one bay. The doorway are in the outer parts and the windows are mullioned.	II
71–81 Totties Lane, Totties; 53.56958°N 1.76302°W	—	Late 18th century	A group of stone houses with quoins, and a stone slate roof with coped gables on cut kneelers. There are three storeys and each house has one bay. There is one single-light window and the other windows are mullioned. Each house has a doorway and a three-light window in the ground floor, a three-light window in the middle floor, and two two-light windows in the top floor.	II
Bartin Farmhouse and barn 53.56149°N 1.86414°W	—	Late 18th century	The barn was added to the farmhouse in 1840. The buildings are in gritstone, with quoins, and stone slate roofs with coped gables and kneelers. The house, which has two storeys, contains doorways and mullioned windows. A single-storey extension links it to the barn, which has a segmental-arched cart entry and a dated keystone, and a small window above.	II
Clitheroe Farmhouse and barn 53.60444°N 1.80396°W	—	Late 18th century	This consists of a mirror-image pair of houses and a barn at right angles. The building is in stone with quoins, and stone slate roofs with coped gables and carved kneelers. The houses have two storeys, and contain doorways and mullioned windows with some mullions removed. The barn contains a large doorway with a round-arched head, a smaller doorway, mullioned windows, and a single-light window.	II
Denhirst; 53.56355°N 1.76343°W	—	Late 18th century	A pair of mirror-image houses in stone with quoins, and a stone slate roof with coped gables and moulded kneelers. There are two storeys and two bays. The doorways are in the outer parts of the front and have deep slightly arched lintels, and there is a two-light mullioned window in each floor of each house.	II
Eastgate and Upper Fold; 53.60437°N 1.79141°W		Late 18th century	A pair of back-to-back houses combined into one dwelling, it is in stone, partly rendered, with quoins and a stone slate roof. There are two storeys, an attic and a basement, and it contains mullioned windows with up to six lights.	II
High Royd; 53.61052°N 1.77832°W	—	Late 18th century	A large detached stone house with a moulded eaves cornice, a hipped stone slate roof, and two storeys. In the southeast front is a doorway with a fanlight flanked by two-storey canted bay windows, and another doorway to the right. The southwest front has six bays, sash windows in the ground floor and casement windows in the upper floor.	II
Horn Cote; 53.57490°N 1.74415°W	—	Late 18th century	A pair of mirror-image houses combined into one, it is in stone with quoins, and a stone slate roof with coped gables and kneelers. There are two storeys, two bays, and a lean-to rear extension. The doorways have deep lintels, and the windows are mullioned with one light blocked.	II
Magdale House (east part); 53.60633°N 1.81130°W		Late 18th century	Originally two houses, later combined into one, it is in stone, with a stone slate roof, two storeys, two bays, and mullioned windows. There is a central doorway, and in each bay is a four-light window in each floor.	II
Park Riding; 53.61076°N 1.78243°W	—	Late 18th century	A large detached stone house with quoins, and a stone slate roof with gable copings on large kneelers. There are two storeys and an attic, and an entrance front of three bays with a pedimented gable containing a single-light window. The central doorway has a segmental-headed fanlight and the windows are sashes.	II
The Cottages, Snowgate Head; 53.57411°N 1.73370°W	—	Late 18th century	A pair of houses in a group and later combined, they are in stone, rendered at the rear, with quoins and a stone slate roof. There are two storeys, two bays and a rear extension. The windows are mullioned, with some lights blocked, and at the rear is a French window.	II
Weavers Cottage, Hepworth; 53.55778°N 1.75559°W		Late 18th century	A pair of mirror image houses, later combined into one, it is in stone with quoins, and a stone slate roof with chamfered gable copings on carved kneelers. There are three storeys, and in the ground floor is a doorway with chamfered reveals and a deep lintel. The upper floors contain six-light mullioned windows with some lights blocked.	II
West Royd Farmhouse; 53.58075°N 1.73780°W	—	Late 18th century	A stone house with quoins, and a stone slate roof with gable copings on carved kneelers. There are two storeys and two bays. In the centre is a doorway, and the windows are mullioned, with some mullions removed.	II
31 and 33 Church Street, Honley; 53.60476°N 1.79323°W		1789	A pair of stone houses on a plinth, No. 33 is rendered, they both have a string course, a moulded eaves cornice, a stone slate roof, and two storeys. The windows are mullioned or have single lights, and the doorways are in the centre of the pair. In the ground floor of No. 31 is a tall two-light window, No. 33 has a four light window, and in the upper floor both houses have a single-light window and a four-light window.	II
60 Paris Road, Scholes; 53.56387°N 1.76442°W	—	1790	A stone house in a terrace, it has quoins on the left, a stone slate roof, and two storeys. In the centre is a doorway with a deep lintel, and over it is an inscribed and dated plaque. Most of the mullions have been removed from the windows.	II
2, 4 and 6 Meal Hill Road, Holme; 53.55027°N 1.83861°W	—	1791	A terrace of stone houses with quoins, moulded gutter brackets, and a stone slate roof with coped gables and moulded kneelers. There are two storeys, and three bays. The doorway has a small fanlight, above it is a datestone, and the windows are mullioned.	II
Honley Bridge; 53.60446°N 1.78903°W		1791	The bridge carries Eastgate over the River Holme. It is in stone, and consists of two segmental arches The bridge has rusticated dressings and a later parapet with an inscription.	II
17 Magdale, Honley; 53.60923°N 1.79346°W		1792	A stone house in a terrace, it has a stone slate roof, two storeys, and one bay. In the ground floor is a doorway to the right and altered windows, in the upper floor is a nine-light mullioned window, and under it is a datestone.	II
35, 37 and 39 Magdale, Honley; 53.60998°N 1.79136°W	—	1793	A terrace of stone houses with quoins, a stone slate roof, and two storeys. The windows are mullioned, and above the doorway of No. 37 is a datestone.	II
Honley Wells; 53.60440°N 1.79178°W		1796	The wells consist of two large stone troughs with walls on two sides. A corner stone is inscribed with initials and a date, and there is a carved plaque.	II
Field End; 53.60059°N 1.78791°W		1799	Originally two mirror-image houses, later combined into one, it is in stone with quoins and a stone slate roof. There are three storeys and two bays, and the windows are mullioned. In the centre is a porch with two doorways, flanked by four-light windows. The upper floors each contain four two-light windows, and there is an oval inscribed and dated plaque.	II
Greaves Head Farmhouse and barn 53.56272°N 1.85348°W	—	c. 1800	The farmhouse and barn are in gritstone, and have stone slate roofs with coped gables. The house has two storeys, a central doorway, and mullioned windows. The attached barn contains a central cart entry with a cantilevered lintel, a doorway and a small window.	II
12 White Ley Bank, Fulstone; 53.58051°N 1.73781°W	—	Late 18th to early 19th century	A pair of houses combined into one dwelling, it is in stone with quoins, and a stone slate roof with coped gables and carved kneelers. There are two storeys and two bays. Most windows are mullioned, there is one single light and some blocked lights.	II
56 and 59 Town Gate and 55 Barracks Fold, Hepworth; 53.55655°N 1.75479°W		Late 18th to early 19th century	A group of weavers' houses in stone with quoins, and a stone slate roof with coped gables and carved kneelers. There are three storeys, two central doorways, and the windows are mullioned, with some mullions removed.	II
14 Magdale, Honley; 53.61009°N 1.78994°W	—	Late 18th to early 19th century	A house with an attached cottage, it is in stone with quoins and a stone slate roof with coped gables and carved kneelers. The house has three storeys and a symmetrical front of three bays, a central doorway with a fanlight, and sash windows. The cottage to the east has two storeys and mullioned windows, and at the rear is a staircase window.	II
41 and 43 Magdale, Honley; 53.61009°N 1.79104°W	—	Late 18th to early 19th century	A house at the end of a terrace, it is in stone with quoins and a stone slate roof. There are two storeys and the windows are mullioned. On the front is a porch, with a two-light window to the left and a four-light window to the right, and the upper floor contains two three-light and one two-light windows.	II
5 and 7 Moor Bottom, Honley; 53.60239°N 1.79394°W		Late 18th to early 19th century	A pair of stone houses in a terrace, with a stone slate roof. There are three storeys, and the windows are mullioned, with some mullions removed. No. 5 has a modern porch, and No. 7 has a doorway with a fanlight.	II
3 and 5 New Street, Honley; 53.60418°N 1.79261°W		Late 18th to early 19th century	Houses in a terrace, they are in stone with quoins and a stone slate roof. There are two storeys, and No. 3 has a basement. The windows are mullioned, and some mullions have been removed.	II
66, 68 and 70 Thirstin Road, Honley; 53.60617°N 1.79779°W	—	Late 18th to early 19th century (probable)	A row of three houses in stone with quoins and a stone slate roof. No. 70 has two storeys, the other houses have three, and there is a gabled extension on the front. The windows are mullioned, and some lights have been blocked.	II
3, 4, 5, 6 and 7 Hill Street, Jackson Bridge; 53.56308°N 1.75441°W	—	Late 18th to early 19th century	A terrace of five weavers' houses, they are in stone with a stone slate roof, three storeys, and mullioned windows. Each house has a doorway and a three-light window in the ground floor, and a six-light window in both upper floors.	II
39, 41 and 43 Butterly, New Mill; 53.56980°N 1.75091°W	—	Late 18th to early 19th century	A row of three houses, part of a group, they are in stone with quoins and a stone slate roof. There are two storeys, and the windows are mullioned. In the ground floor of each house is a doorway and a three-light window, and in the upper floor are two three-light windows.	II
50 Penistone Road, New Mill; 53.57406°N 1.74947°W	—	Late 18th to early 19th century	A detached stone house with quoins and a stone slate roof. There are three storeys, and the windows are mullioned. In the ground floor is a central doorway flanked by two-light windows, and in each upper floor are two three-light windows.	II
52 and 54 Paris Road, Scholes; 53.56395°N 1.76393°W	—	Late 18th to early 19th century	A pair of stone houses at the end of a terrace, they have quoins and a stone slate roof. There are three storeys, and the windows are mullioned, with some mullions removed. The doorway to No. 52 is in the centre and the doorway of No. 54 is to the left.	II
56 and 58 Paris Road, Scholes; 53.56393°N 1.76405°W	—	Late 18th to early 19th century	A pair of stone houses in a terrace with a stone slate roof, three storeys, and mullioned windows. Each house has a doorway and a four-light windows in the ground floor and two two-light windows in the upper floor.	II
43 and 44 Upper Oldfield; 53.58815°N 1.80065°W	—	Late 18th to early 19th century	A pair of mirror-image cottages at the end of a row, they are in stone with quoins and a stone slate roof. There are two storeys, and each cottage has two bays. On the front are a porch and a later doorway, and the windows are mullioned.	II
Bridge, Smithy Place; 53.59649°N 1.77467°W		Late 18th to early 19th century	The bridge carries a lane over the River Holme, it is in stone, and consists of a single segmental arch. The bridge has voussoirs, a string course at the base of the parapet, and large round copings.	II
Cottage, Upper Lydgate Farm; 53.55084°N 1.83887°W	—	Late 18th to early 19th century	A stone cottage with a stone slate roof, two storeys, and mullioned windows. In the ground floor is a central doorway with chamfered reveals, a single light window and a three-light window, and the upper floor contains a two-light window and two three-light windows.	II
House, Upper House Road; 53.55114°N 1.76974°W	—	Late 18th to early 19th century	A former weavers' house, it is in stone with quoins, and a stone slate roof with coped gables. There are three storeys, a central doorway, and mullioned windows with some blocked lights.	II
Mag Bridge; 53.60804°N 1.79619°W		Late 18th to early 19th century	Three houses in a terrace, they are in stone with a stone slate roof, two storeys, and mullioned windows. Each house has a doorway, a window with two or four lights in the ground floor, and a six-light window in the upper floor.	II
Northgate Mount; 53.60706°N 1.78653°W	—	c. 1820	A large detached stone house on a plinth, with a sill band, a moulded eaves cornice and blocking course, and a slate roof, hipped to the west. There are two storeys, an entrance front of three bays, and a garden front of five bays. The entrance front has a central porch with fluted columns and a full dentilled entablature. In the centre of the garden front is a single-storey canted bay window, and to the right is a two-storey canted bay window.	II
64, 65 and 66 Town Gate, Hepworth; 53.55622°N 1.75439°W		Early 19th century	A row of three weavers' houses in stone, with a stone slate roof and coped gables. No. 64 has three storeys and the other houses have two. Nos. 65 and 66 form a pair, and the windows are mullioned.	II
78, 79, 80 and 81 Town Gate, Hepworth; 53.55571°N 1.75389°W		Early 19th century	A terrace of four stone houses with a stone slate roof. There are two storeys, No. 78 has a porch, and the windows are mullioned, with some mullions removed.	II
28 and 29 Upper Gate, Hepworth; 53.55757°N 1.75597°W		Early 19th century	A pair of stone houses with a stone slate roof. Each house has three bays and a central doorway. The house to the left has two storeys, and the house to the right has three. Most of the windows are mullioned, some have single lights, and some have been altered.	II
331, 333 and 335 Woodhead Road, Holme; 53.54729°N 1.84285°W	—	Early 19th century	Three cottages, later two dwellings, they are in stone, with coped gables, and two storeys. Each part has a doorway and mullioned windows, with a four-light window in the ground floor, and two three-light windows in the upper floor.	II
13 Cuckoo Lane, Honley; 53.60368°N 1.79427°W	—	Early 19th century	A house at the end of a terrace, in stone, partly rendered, with a stone slate roof. There are two storey and an attic, and the windows are mullioned. In the ground floor is a modern porch and a five-light window. The upper floor contains a seven-light window, the middle light blocked, and in the attic is a four-light window.	II
30 and 32 Gynn Lane, Honley; 53.60576°N 1.78316°W	—	Early 19th century	A pair of stone houses with sill bands and a stone slate roof. There are three storeys and the windows are mullioned. In the ground floor of each house is an entrance and a four-light window with two mullions removed, and in both upper floors are six-light windows, with one mullion removed.	II
114 Hall Ing, Honley; 53.60339°N 1.77159°W	—	Early 19th century	A stone house, part of a group, with a stone slate roof. There are two storeys and one bay. On the southeast front is a three-light mullioned window in each floor.	II
120 Hall Ing, Honley; 53.60350°N 1.77194°W	—	Early 19th century	A stone house, part of a group, with a stone slate roof. There are two storeys and one bay. At the rear is a later porch, and the windows are mullioned.	II
52, 54, 56 and 66 Huddersfield Road, Honley; 53.60986°N 1.78735°W	—	Early 19th century	A group of back-to-back weavers' houses in stone, partly rendered, with a sill band and a stone slate roof. There are three storeys, two bays, and two single-storey extensions. The doorways are in the outer parts and the windows are mullioned, originally with five lights each, and some mullions have been removed.	II
6 Magdale, Honley; 53.60864°N 1.79410°W	—	Early 19th century	A house in a terrace, it is in stone with a stone slate roof, two storeys and mullioned windows. In the ground floor is a doorway with a rendered surround and a three-light window, and the upper floor contains a four-light window.	II
53 and 55 Magdale, Honley; 53.61030°N 1.79055°W	—	Early 19th century	A pair of mirror-image houses in stone, with a stone slate roof, and three storeys. The ground floor has been altered, and in the upper floors are mullioned windows, with six lights in the middle floor of each house, and three lights in the top floor.	II
57 and 59 Magdale, Honley; 53.61031°N 1.79025°W	—	Early 19th century	A pair of mirror-image houses in stone, with a stone slate roof, and two storeys. In the centre is a blocked doorway, and to the left and right are porches. The windows are mullioned, and each house has a five-light window in the ground floor and a six-light window in the upper floor.	II
5 Old Moll Road, Honley; 53.60535°N 1.80664°W	—	Early 19th century	Two cottages, later altered and combined into one dwelling, it is in stone with a stone slate roof. There are two storeys, two bays, and a later rear extension. On the front are two doorways, one blocked, and the windows are mullioned.	II
24, 26, and 28 Westgate and 1, 2 and 7 Lupton Square, Honley; 53.60336°N 1.79290°W		Early 19th century	A terrace of three back-to-back houses in stone, with a stone slate roof, two storeys and attics. Steps lead up to a doorway in each house, some of the windows have single lights, and the others are mullioned. In the gable end is a partly blocked taking-in door.	II
9, 10 and 11 Scholes Road, Jackson Bridge; 53.56345°N 1.75466°W	—	Early 19th century	A row of three houses at the end of a terrace, they are in stone with a stone slate roof. There are three storeys, and each house has a doorway and mullioned windows with some mullions removed.	II
12 and 15 Scholes Road, Jackson Bridge; 53.56399°N 1.75552°W	—	Early 19th century	A pair of mirror image houses in stone with sill bands and a stone slate roof. There are three storeys and each house has one bay. The doorways are in the centre, and each house has mullioned windows, with three lights in the ground floor and six lights in both upper floors.	II
12 and 13 Oldfield; 53.58947°N 1.79577°W	—	Early 19th century	A pair of weavers' houses in stone with sill bands and a stone slate roof. There are three storeys, and some of the windows are blocked, and the others are mullioned.	II
14, 15, 16 and 17 Oldfield; 53.58936°N 1.79511°W	—	Early 19th century	Four houses in a terrace of seven, they are in stone with a stone slate roof. There are two storeys, and a lean-to extension to No. 15. The windows are mullioned, and contain up to eight lights, some of which are blocked.	II
18, 19 and 20 Oldfield; 53.58949°N 1.79530°W	—	Early 19th century	Three stone houses in a terrace of seven, they are in stone with a stone slate roof. There are three storeys, and the windows are mullioned, with some blocked lights.	II
29 and 30 Oldfield; 53.58909°N 1.79588°W	—	Early 19th century	A pair of mirror-image houses, they are in stone with a stone slate roof and three storeys, The doorways are towards the outside, and the windows are mullioned, with three lights in the ground floor, and five lights in each of the upper two floors.	II
72 and 74 Paris Road, Scholes; 53.56380°N 1.76473°W	—	Early 19th century	A pair of stone houses in a terrace, with a stone slate roof and three storeys. In the centre are two doorways, and the windows are mullioned, with some missing mullions and some blocked lights.	II
31 Totties Lane, Totties; 53.57048°N 1.76431°W	—	Early 19th century	A stone house with a stone slate roof and coped gables, three storeys, and mullioned windows. In the ground floor are a modern porch, a three-light window and an altered window, and in the upper floors are eight-light windows with some blocked lights.	II
54 and 56 Totties Lane and barn, Totties; 53.56964°N 1.76345°W	—	Early 19th century	A pair of houses, later combined, and an attached barn, in stone with a stone slate roof. The house has two storeys, and two bays, and contains mullioned windows, with one light blocked. The barn to the right has quoins, and contains a large, partly blocked, elliptical-arched entry.	II
1, 3 and 5 Sike Lane, Totties; 53.56971°N 1.76375°W	—	Early 19th century	A row of three stone houses with a stone slate roof and three storeys. Each house has a doorway approached by steps, and the windows are mullioned; in each of the upper two floors of No. 1 there are eight-light windows, and in the other houses they have five lights.	II
8, 10, 12 and 14 Sike Lane, Totties; 53.56945°N 1.76439°W	—	Early 19th century	A row of five, later four, houses in stone with quoins, stone slate roofs and three storeys. Most of the windows are mullioned, some lights have been blocked, and there is an inserted bow window.	II
Butcher's Arms, Hepworth; 53.55747°N 1.75542°W		Early 19th century	The public house is in stone with quoins on the left, and a stone slate roof with carved kneelers on the left. There are two storeys and three bays. On the front are two later porches, and the windows are mullioned, with some mullions removed.	II
Honley House; 53.60547°N 1.79235°W	—	Early 19th century (probable)	A wing was added later to the south. The house is in stone with a hipped slate roof. There are two storeys, the original part has three bays, and the south wing has a further three bays. The original part has a symmetrical front with a central Doric portico containing a frieze, a cornice and a blocking course, and the door has a rectangular fanlight. The windows in both parts are sashes, and in the south front is a canted bay window.	II
Lord's Mill; 53.60607°N 1.80679°W		Early 19th century	The mill, which was later extended, and is now disused, is in stone with an asbestos roof, and has two and three storeys. The earliest part has four bays, there is a later one-bay extension to the south, and a three-bay extension to the north, which includes a tapering square chimney. The windows are mullioned, some mullions have been removed, and in the earliest part is an arched opening for the mill pond.	II
Meal Hill; 53.55259°N 1.84107°W	—	Early 19th century	A pair of houses and a barn in one range, they are in stone with a stone slate roof. The houses have two storeys, there are two doorways and a single-light window, and the other windows are mullioned, with some lights blocked. The barn to the left contains a partly blocked segmental-arched central doorway.	II
Northgate House; 53.60696°N 1.78798°W	—	Early 19th century	A large detached stone house with sill bands, a moulded eaves cornice, and a hipped slate roof. There are two storeys, an entrance front of three bays, a garden front of five bays, and a rear extension. The windows are sashes. In the entrance front is a central Doric portico with a frieze, a cornice and a blocking course, and the door has a round-headed fanlight. The middle three bays of the garden front contain a two-storey canted bay window.	II
Park Nook; 53.54771°N 1.79543°W	—	Early 19th century	A pair of cottages, part of a row, they are in stone with quoins and a stone slate roof. There are two storeys and each house has a doorway and mullioned windows, with some lights blocked.	II
Stalley Royd Farmhouse; 53.56411°N 1.74999°W	—	Early 19th century	Originally two mirror-image houses, later combined into one, it is in stone with moulded brackets, and a stone slate roof with coped gables. There are three storeys, two bays, and later extensions. In the centre are two doorways, one partly blocked, and the windows are mullioned, with three lights in the ground floor and four lights in the upper floors.	II
Ward Boundary Stone in front of 24 Rock Terrace, Brockholes; 53.59494°N 1.77276°W		1829	The boundary stone is on the east side of New Mill Road (A616 road), and marked the boundary between the wards of Honley and Thurstonland. It consists of a slab of stone with a round top, inscribed with a vertical line, "BOUNDARY BETWEEN", the names of the wards, and the date.	II
Christ Church, New Mill; 53.57470°N 1.75064°W		1829–30	A Commissioners' church designed by Peter Atkinson, it was restored and the chancel was enlarged in 1881–82. It is built in stone with a slate roof, and consists of a nave, a chancel, and a west tower. The tower has three stages, angle buttresses, and a parapet that has tall corner pinnacles with conical tops.	II
Gate piers and gates, Christ Church; 53.57456°N 1.75090°W	—	c. 1830	At the entry to the churchyard are octagonal stone gate piers with conical caps, and between them are iron gates.	II
9 Barnside; 53.55018°N 1.74235°W	—	Early to mid-19th century	A house at the end of a row, it is in stone with a stone slate roof, two storeys, and mullioned windows. In the ground floor is a doorway and a three-light window, and the upper floor contains a six-light window.	II
3 Holme; 53.55013°N 1.83765°W	—	Early to mid-19th century	A house in a terrace, it is in stone with quoins, moulded gutter brackets, and a stone slate roof. There are three storeys and symmetrical front of three bays. In the centre is a doorway, the windows are mullioned, and at the rear is a partly blocked taking-in door.	II
5 Holme; 53.55008°N 1.83773°W	—	Early to mid-19th century	A house at the end of a terrace, it is in stone with quoins, moulded gutter brackets, and a stone slate roof. There are three storeys, and two doorways, one with chamfered reveals and a Tudor arched head. Some windows are mullioned, some have single lights, and in the gable end is a blocked taking-in door.	II
10, 12 and 14 Holme; 53.55005°N 1.83814°W		Early to mid-19th century	A row of three stone cottages with a stone slate roof. There are two storeys, two porches on the front, and a doorway in the right gable end, and the windows are mullioned.	II
16 Holme; 53.55006°N 1.83829°W	—	Early to mid-19th century	A stone house at the end of a terrace, with moulded gutter brackets and a stone slate roof. There are three storeys and three bays. In the centre is a later porch, the windows are mullioned, and in the left gable end is a blocked taking-in door in the upper floor.	II
25 and 27 Holme; 53.54954°N 1.83796°W	—	Early to mid-19th century	A pair of stone houses with sill bands, a stone slate roof, and three storeys. The windows are mullioned with up to seven lights, and some lights are blocked.	II
8 Meal Hill Road and barn, Holme; 53.55033°N 1.83864°W	—	Early to mid-19th century	The house and attached barn are at the end of a terrace, and are in stone with a stone slate roof. The house has two storeys, mullioned windows, and a projecting porch. The barn to the left contains a large central doorway with an inserted garage door, and a single-light window to the left.	II
370, 372 and 374 Woodhead Road, Holme; 53.54712°N 1.84561°W	—	Early to mid-19th century	Three houses in a terrace, they are in stone with a stone slate roof and two storeys. The windows are mullioned, and in each house is a doorway with a two-light window to the left and a three-light window to the right, and in the upper floor are two three-light windows.	II
14, 16, 18 and 20 Chandler Lane, Honley; 53.60101°N 1.80632°W	—	Early to mid-19th century	A group of four weavers' cottages in an isolated position. They are in stone, and have stone slate roofs with coped gables. The outer cottages have three storeys and the two inner cottages have two. The windows are mullioned with up to six lights, and some lights are blocked.	II
2 Grasscroft Road and adjoining building, Honley; 53.60048°N 1.79827°W	—	Early to mid-19th century	A house and a former weaving building, it is in stone with a string course, and a stone slate roof with coped gables. There are three storeys and the windows are mullioned. In the middle and top floors of the west front are twelve-light windows and also a two-light window in the top floor. The south gable end contains a loading door converted into a window in the top floor. The entrance is in the east front, and there are further windows in the north gable end.	II
20, 22 and 24 Grasscroft Road, Honley; 53.60170°N 1.79920°W	—	Early to mid-19th century	A terrace of three houses in stone that has a stone slate roof with coped gables and molded kneelers on the west. There are two storeys, each house has a doorway, and the windows are mullioned.	II
106 Hall Ing, Honley; 53.60350°N 1.77173°W	—	Early to mid-19th century	A stone house, part of a group, it is in stone with a stone slate roof. There are two storeys and one bay. In the ground floor is a doorway and a sash window, and in the upper floor and at the rear are two-light mullioned windows.	II
110 Hall Ing, Honley; 53.60352°N 1.77183°W	—	Early to mid-19th century	A stone house, part of a group, it is in stone with a stone slate roof. There are two storeys and one bay. The windows are mullioned and each has two lights.	II
3 and 5 High Street, Honley; 53.60349°N 1.79392°W		Early to mid-19th century	A pair of houses, they are in stone with a sill band and a stone slate roof. There are two storeys and a basement at the rear, and most of the windows are mullioned. At the front, the ground floor of each house has a doorway and a three-light window, and in the upper floor is a six-light window. At the rear are garages in the basements, single-light windows in the ground floor, and mullioned windows in the top floor.	II
21 and 23 Magdale, Honley; 53.60954°N 1.79279°W	—	Early to mid-19th century	A pair of stone houses with a sill band and a stone slate roof. There are two storeys and a symmetrical front of three bays. On the front are two doorways, and the windows are mullioned.	II
10, 11, 12 and 13 Well Hill, Honley; 53.60338°N 1.79530°W		Early to mid-19th century	Two pairs of mirror-image cottages forming a terrace, they are in stone with sill bands and a stone slate roof. There are three storeys, each pair of cottages has paired central doorways, and the windows are mullioned.	II
5 and 6 East Street and 17 Chapel Bank, Jackson Bridge; 53.56314°N 1.75247°W	—	Early to mid-19th century	A pair of stone houses with a stone slate roof, four storeys at the front and two at the rear. There are two doorways on the front, two on the rear, one of which is blocked, and the windows are mullioned with some blocked lights.	II
9 East Street, Jackson Bridge; 53.56345°N 1.75241°W	—	Early to mid-19th century	A former weaver's house in stone with a stone slate roof. There are three storeys and a central doorway. Flanking the doorway are sash windows, and in the upper floors are nine-light mullioned windows, with one blocked light.	II
1 and 2 Hill Street, Jackson Bridge; 53.56327°N 1.75458°W	—	Early to mid-19th century	A pair of cottages at the end of a terrace, they are in stone and have a stone slate roof. There are two storeys, and each cottage has a doorway and mullioned windows.	II
26 and 28 Sude Hill, New Mill; 53.57524°N 1.75225°W	—	Early to mid-19th century	A pair of houses at the end of a terrace, they are in stone with a stone slate roof and coped gables. There are two storeys, and each house has two bays and mullioned windows. In each house is a doorway to the right, a three-light window to the left, and two three-light window in the upper floor.	II
2 and 3 March Road, Scholes; 53.56199°N 1.76338°W	—	Early to mid-19th century	A pair of houses in a terrace, they are in stone and have a stone slate roof with coped gables. There are three storeys and the windows are mullioned. Each house has a doorway, a single-light and a two-light window in the ground floor, two single-light and one two-light windows in the middle floor, and a nine-light window in the top floor.	II
43 and 45 Paris Road, Scholes; 53.56388°N 1.76345°W	—	Early to mid-19th century	A pair of stone houses with a sill band, a moulded eaves cornice, and a stone slate roof with coped gables. There are three storeys and a central doorway, and the windows are mullioned with some blocked lights.	II
Former Co-op Building, Hepworth; 53.55652°N 1.75420°W		Early to mid-19th century	A row of houses, at one time used as a shop, they are in stone with a stone slate roof. There are two storeys at the front and four at the rear, and the windows are mullioned with up to six lights.	II
Milestone, Honley; 53.59964°N 1.78378°W		Early to mid-19th century	The milestone, which is partly buried, is on the east side of Woodhead Road (A6024 road). It consists of a stone with a rounded top inscribed with the distances to Huddersfield and Woodhead.	II
Milestone between Holme and Lane; 53.54806°N 1.84048°W		Early to mid-19th century	The milestone is on the southeast side of Woodhead Road (A6024 road). It consists of a painted stone with a rounded top inscribed with the distances to Huddersfield and Woodhead.	II
Milestone near Holme Moss summit 53.53953°N 1.84823°W	—	Early to mid-19th century	The milestone is on the east side of the A6024 road. It consists of a stone post with a rounded top, and it is inscribed with the distances to Huddersfield and Woodhead.	II
Milestone near Hubberton; 53.55628°N 1.77866°W		Early to mid-19th century	The milestone is on the east side of Dunford Road (B6106 road). It consists of a painted stone with a rounded top inscribed with the distances to Holmfirth and Sheffield.	II
Mill Building, Cocking Steps Bridge; 53.60782°N 1.81241°W		Early to mid-19th century	The mill was later extended to the west, and is now disused. It is in stone, the original part has a stone slate roof, the roof of the extension is slated, and there are coped gables and moulded kneelers. Both parts have three storeys, the original block has nine bays, and the extension, which is recessed, has five bays. Both parts contain casement windows and loading doors.	II
Sandygate Farm; 53.56382°N 1.76856°W	—	Early to mid-19th century	A house in the middle of a row, it is in millstone grit with quoins, moulded brackets, and a stone slate roof. There are two storeys, a central doorway, and mullioned windows.	II
Spring Cottage; 53.54708°N 1.84589°W	—	Early to mid-19th century	Formerly two houses at the end of a terrace, later combined into one, it is in stone with a stone slate roof, two storeys, and mullioned windows. The two original doorways are partly blocked, and a later doorway has been inserted.	II
Village Hall, Brockholes; 53.59500°N 1.77090°W		1837	A school, later used as a village hall, it is in stone on a chamfered plinth, with corbelled eaves and a stone slate roof. On the front is a porch with a coped gable and kneelers, and containing a round-headed window. Flanking the porch are pairs of square-headed windows, one pair to the right and eight to the left. In each gable end are two round-headed windows, and the left gable end has an oval plaque. On the roof are eight triangular dormers with finials.	II
Church Sunday School, Longley; 53.55429°N 1.78484°W	—	1839	The Sunday school is in stone with moulded gutter brackets, and a stone slate roof with coped gables and kneelers. There is a single storey and sides of six and four bays. The doorway and windows have semicircular-arched heads.	II
Wood Royd Methodist Church; 53.60688°N 1.77680°W		1840	The church, with a Sunday school at the rear, is in stone with moulded brackets, and a half-hipped slate roof. The entrance front has a pedimented gable containing an oculus. In the centre is a double door with a round-arched fanlight, flanked by large round-arched windows with impost blocks and keystones. Above these is an inscription. On the sides are two storeys and three bays.	II
Hall Ings House and Barn; 53.60292°N 1.77152°W	—	c. 1840	The house and attached barn are in stone with stone slate roofs. The house has a sill band, two storeys, and three bays. In the centre is a doorway with a small moulded cornice, the windows are sashes, and at the rear is a round-headed staircase window. The barn protrudes on the right, and contains central doorway with elliptical-headed porches on both fronts, smaller doorways, and ventilation slits.	II
Wash Pit Mill; 53.55649°N 1.78670°W		c. 1840	The textile mill is in stone, and has a stone slate roof with coped gables and kneelers. There are four storeys and an attic, a gabled front of five bays, and sides of seven bays. Most windows have flat heads, in the gable end two windows have lintels aligned with the roof, and in the apex is a round-headed window. On the side are taking-in doors in three storeys.	II
Hade Edge Methodist Chapel; 53.54493°N 1.78140°W		1841	The church is in stone, and has a stone slate roof with coped gables. There is a single storey and a gabled entrance front of four bays. The right bay contains a doorway with a fanlight, in the left bay is a former doorway converted into a window, and the middle two bays contain round-headed windows. Above these are two string courses between which is an inscribed and dated tablet.	II
St Mary's Church, Honley; 53.60494°N 1.79299°W		1842–43	The church was designed by R. D. Chantrell, and alterations were made in 1888 by C. Hodgson Fowler. It is built in stone with a stone slate roof, and consists of a nave with a clerestory, north and south aisles, two south porches, a chancel with a three-sided apse, a vestry, an organ chamber, and a west tower. The tower has four stages, a clock face on each side, and a plain parapet with corner pinnacles. On the chancel is a small bellcote.	II
Gate piers and gates, St Mary's Church; 53.60475°N 1.79293°W		1843	The stone gate piers at the entrance to the churchyard have octagonal shafts on square bases and small rounded caps. Between them are iron gates and an overthrow.	II
Church of England School, Honley; 53.60445°N 1.79427°W		1846	The school is in stone with a slate roof. It consists of a two-storey central bay flanked by two single-storey bays on each side. All the bays have gables with coping and finials. In the central bay is a projecting gabled porch with an inscription and the date, and above it is a three-light Tudor arched window. In each of the other bays is a six-light mullioned and transomed window with a stepped head and a hood mould.	II
1, 3 and 5 Scotgate Road, Honley; 53.60383°N 1.79586°W		Mid-19th century	A row of three houses in a terrace, they are in stone with sill bands and a stone slate roof. There are three storeys and basements, each house has a doorway, and the windows are mullioned.	II
Oldfield House; 53.59047°N 1.79558°W	—	Mid-19th century	The house, part of a farm group, is in stone with quoins, a sill band, a moulded eaves cornice, and a stone slate roof with coped gables. There are two storeys at the front, three at the rear, and a symmetrical front of three bays. In the centre is a doorway with a fanlight and a moulded canopy, and the windows are sashes.	II
Privies, Choppards Sunday School; 53.55424°N 1.78502°W		Mid-19th century	The former privies and ashpit are in stone and without a roof. The building is gabled, and contains two round-arched openings at ground level above which are two stones with circles cut into them. To the left is a coalhouse, and to the right a flight of steps leading to the upper level.	II
Ward boundary post at junction of Marsh Lane; 53.57480°N 1.72571°W		Mid-19th century	The boundary post is at the junction of the Penistone Road (A635 road) with Marsh Lane, and marked the boundary between the wards of Shepley and Fulstone. It consists of a stone with a rounded top inscribed with a vertical line flanked by the names of the wards.	II
Methodist Sunday School, Hade Edge; 53.54477°N 1.78115°W	—	c. 1850–60	The Sunday school is in stone, and has a stone slate roof with coped gables. There is a single storey and five bays. In the central bay is a protruding gabled porch, and all the bays contain round-headed windows.	II
Scholes Methodist Chapel; 53.56224°N 1.76309°W		1860	The chapel is in stone with rusticated quoins, and a stone slate roof with coped gables. The entrance front is gabled and has three bays, and along the sides are four bays. The central doorway has an architrave and a moulded cornice on simple capitals. It is flanked by round-arched windows with impost blocks and keystones, and above the door is an inscribed plaque.	II
St George's Church, Brockholes; 53.59563°N 1.77213°W		1861	The church, which was later extended, is in stone with a slate roof. It consists of a nave with a baptistry, and a chancel with a vestry and organ chamber. Rising from the baptistry is an octagonal louvred bell turret with a spire.	II
Holy Trinity Church, Hepworth; 53.55895°N 1.75563°W		1862–63	The church, which is in Decorated style, is built in stone with a slate roof. It has a cruciform plan, consisting of a nave, a west porch, north and south transepts, a chancel, and a tower in the angle of the north transept and the chancel. The tower has three stages and a broach spire.	II
Milepost, Wheels Brook; 53.57099°N 1.83277°W		Mid- to late 19th century	The milepost is on the south side of Greenfield Road (A635 road). It is in cast iron on a stone post, and has a triangular plan and a curved top. On the top is "GREENFIELD & SHEPLEY LANE HEAD ROAD" and "UPPERTHONG", and on the sides are the distances to Holmfirth, Barnsley, Greenfield, and Oldham.	II
Milepost, Bradshaw; 53.56715°N 1.85619°W		Mid- to late 19th century	The milepost is on the south side of Greenfield Road (A635 road). It is in cast iron on a stone post, and has a triangular plan and a curved top. On the top is "GREENFIELD & SHEPLEY LANE HEAD ROAD" and "UPPERTHONG", and on the sides are the distances to Holmfirth, Barnsley, Greenfield, and Oldham.	II
Milepost near Wassenden Head; 53.56382°N 1.87977°W	—	Mid- to late 19th century	The milepost is on the south side of Greenfield Road (A635 road). It is in cast iron on a stone post, and has a triangular plan and a curved top. On the top is "GREENFIELD & SHEPLEY LANE HEAD ROAD" and "UPPERTHONG", and on the sides are the distances to Holmfirth, Barnsley, Greenfield, and Oldham.	II
Milepost, Wassenden Head Moor; 53.55751°N 1.89822°W	—	Mid- to late 19th century	The milepost is on the south side of Greenfield Road (A635 road). It is in cast iron on a stone post, and has a triangular plan and a curved top. On the top is "GREENFIELD & SHEPLEY LANE HEAD ROAD" and "ASTONLEY", and on the sides are the distances to Holmfirth, Barnsley, Greenfield, and Oldham.	II
Milepost, New Mill; 53.57425°N 1.75307°W	—	Mid- to late 19th century	The milepost is on the southwest side of New Mill Road (A635 road). It is in cast iron without a post, and it has a triangular plan and a curved top. On the top is "GREENFIELD & SHEPLEY LANE HEAD ROAD" and "FULSTONE", and on the sides are the distances to Holmfirth, Barnsley, Denby Dale, and Cawthorne.	II
Milepost opposite the Toss o'Coin public house 53.57348°N 1.72996°W		Mid- to late 19th century	The milepost is on the northwest side of New Mill Road (A635 road). It is in cast iron on a stone post, and has a triangular plan and a curved top. On the top is "GREENFIELD & SHEPLEY LANE HEAD ROAD" and "FULSTONE", and on the sides are the distances to Holmfirth, Barnsley, Denby Dale, and Cawthorne.	II
Milepost, Brockholes; 53.59536°N 1.77335°W		Mid- to late 19th century	The milepost is on the west side of New Mills Road (A616 road) nearly opposite the junction of Brockholes Lane. It is in cast iron and consists of a flat plate with a rounded top. In the top part is "NEW MILL DISTRICT ROAD" and "HONLEY" and in the lower part are the distances to Sheffield and Huddersfield.	II
Milepost south of New Mill; 53.57038°N 1.75615°W	—	Mid- to late 19th century	The milepost is on the west side of Sheffield Road (A616 road). It is in cast iron and consists of a flat plate with a rounded top. In the top part is "NEW MILL DISTRICT ROAD" and "FULSTONE" and in the lower part are the distances to Sheffield and Huddersfield.	II
Milepost southeast of Hepworth; 53.54959°N 1.73584°W	—	Mid- to late 19th century	The milepost is on the south side of Sheffield Road (A616 road). It is in cast iron on a stone post, and has a triangular plan and a curved top. On the top is "NEW MILL DISTRICT ROAD" and "HEPWORTH" and on the sides are the distances to Sheffield and Huddersfield.	II
Milepost, Hale Edge (east); 53.54859°N 1.78010°W	—	Mid- to late 19th century	The milepost is on the west side of Penistone Road (B6106 road). It is in cast iron on a stone post, and has a triangular plan and a curved top. On the top is "HOLMFIRTH ROAD" and "WOOLDALE", and on the sides are the distances to Holmfirth, Huddersfield, Sheffield, and Penistone.	II
Milepost, Hale Edge (west); 53.54850°N 1.78083°W	—	Mid- to late 19th century	The milepost is on the east side of Dunford Road. It is in cast iron on a stone post, and has a triangular plan and a curved top. On the top is "DUNFORD ROAD" and "WOOLDALE", and on the sides are the distances to Holmfirth, Huddersfield and Dunford Bridge.	II
Ward Boundary Stone 50 Yards north of the drive to Wickleden; 53.55428°N 1.76966°W		Mid- to late 19th century	The boundary stone is on the northeast side of Little Cake, and marked the boundary between the wards of Wooldale and Scholes. It consists of a stone with a triangular plan inscribed with the names of the wards on the sides.	II
Ward Boundary Stone at junction of Cowcliffe Hill Road; 53.54915°N 1.76387°W		Mid- to late 19th century	The boundary stone is at the junction of Cowcliffe Hill Road and Dean Lane, and marked the boundary between the wards of Hepworth and Scholes. It consists of a stone with a triangular plan inscribed with the names of the wards on the sides.	II
Ward Boundary Stone at junction of Marsh Road, Scholes; 53.56317°N 1.76319°W	—	Mid- to late 19th century	The boundary stone is on the northwest side of White Wells Road, and marked the boundary between the wards of Wooldale and Scholes. It consists of a stone with a triangular plan inscribed with the names of the wards on the sides.	II
Ward Boundary Stone on Bridge over Jackson Bridge Dike; 53.56313°N 1.75340°W	—	Mid- to late 19th century	The boundary stone is on the northeast side of the bridge, and marked the boundary between the wards of Hepworth and Scholes. It consists of a stone with a triangular plan inscribed with the names of the wards on the sides. It is badly worn and partly buried.	II
Ward Boundary Stone 50 yards south of junction with South View, Jackson Bridge; 53.56285°N 1.75107°W	—	Mid- to late 19th century	The boundary stone is on the east side of Sheffield Road (A616 road), and marked the boundary between the wards of Hepworth and Fulston. It consists of a stone with a triangular plan inscribed with the names of the wards on the sides.	II
Sundial House; 53.60461°N 1.79642°W		c. 1870	A pair of stone houses with a stone slate roof. There are two storeys, and each house has three bays. On the front between the houses is an inclined stone sundial with a gnomon, one of the houses has an inscribed lintel, and the windows are sashes.	II
Milepost east of Hepworth; 53.55767°N 1.74807°W	—	Late 19th century	The milepost is on the northeast side of Sheffield Road (A616 road). It is in cast iron on a stone post, and has a triangular plan and a curved top. On the top is "NEW MILL DISTRICT ROAD" and "HEPWORTH", and in the lower part are the distances to Sheffield and Huddersfield.	II
Ward Boundary Stone, Hall Ing Road; 53.59998°N 1.76131°W		Late 19th century	The boundary stone is on the north side of the road, and marked the boundary between the wards of Farmley Tyas and Thurstonland. It consists of a stone post with a triangular plan and is inscribed with the names of the wards.	II
Ward Boundary Stone at Junction of Dick Edge Lane and Windmill Lane; 53.55974°N 1.73354°W	—	Late 19th century	The boundary stone is at the northeast of the junction, and marked the boundary between the wards of Hepworth and Scholes. It consists of a stone post with a triangular plan and is inscribed with the names of the wards.	II
War Memorial, Brockholes; 53.59447°N 1.77046°W		c. 1920	The war memorial is at a road junction, it is in limestone, and consists of a Latin cross on a stepped wall with moulded coping. It is flanked by curving walls ending in piers and containing carvings of wreaths in relief. Under the cross is a granite tablet with an inscription and the names of those lost in the First World War, and below is another tablet with the names of those lost in the Second World War. The area is enclosed by iron railings, piers and gates.	II
Telephone kiosk, Hall Ing Lane; 53.60318°N 1.77122°W	—	1935	A K6 type telephone kiosk, designed by Giles Gilbert Scott. Constructed in cast iron with a square plan and a dome, it has three unperforated crowns in the top panels.	II
Telephone kiosk, Hepworth; 53.55755°N 1.75536°W		1935	A K6 type telephone kiosk, designed by Giles Gilbert Scott. Constructed in cast iron with a square plan and a dome, it has three unperforated crowns in the top panels.	II
Telephone kiosk, Magdale; 53.60977°N 1.79164°W	—	1935	A K6 type telephone kiosk, designed by Giles Gilbert Scott. Constructed in cast iron with a square plan and a dome, it has three unperforated crowns in the top panels.	II
Virginia House; 53.60917°N 1.79750°W	—	1937–38	The house is in sandstone with flat roofs and is in Moderne style. There are two storeys, curving walls forming interlocking cubes, and Crittall-style windows. On the front is a central doorway between two incurving walls, to the right is a semicircular stair tower, and to the left is an integral garage. In the upper floor are three windows, one a French window with a balcony.	II
Farnley Hey; 53.61200°N 1.77119°W	—	1953–54	A house in Modernist style designed by Peter Womersley, it is built in stone, pale brick, teak slatting and glass on a timber frame, and has a flat roof. It has two storeys, an L-shaped plan, and is partly open-plan. The house was extended in 1964–65.	II
Underhill; 53.54997°N 1.83652°W	—	1973–75	An earth-sheltered house designed by Arthur Quarmby, it is built in stone and reinforced concrete, and has one storey. The side walls are formed from embankments, rockeries and sandstone, the roof is of turf with lanterns and ventilators, and the windows and patio doors have aluminium frames.	II
