= Wooldale =

Village in West Yorkshire, England

Coordinates: 53.580°N 1.766°W

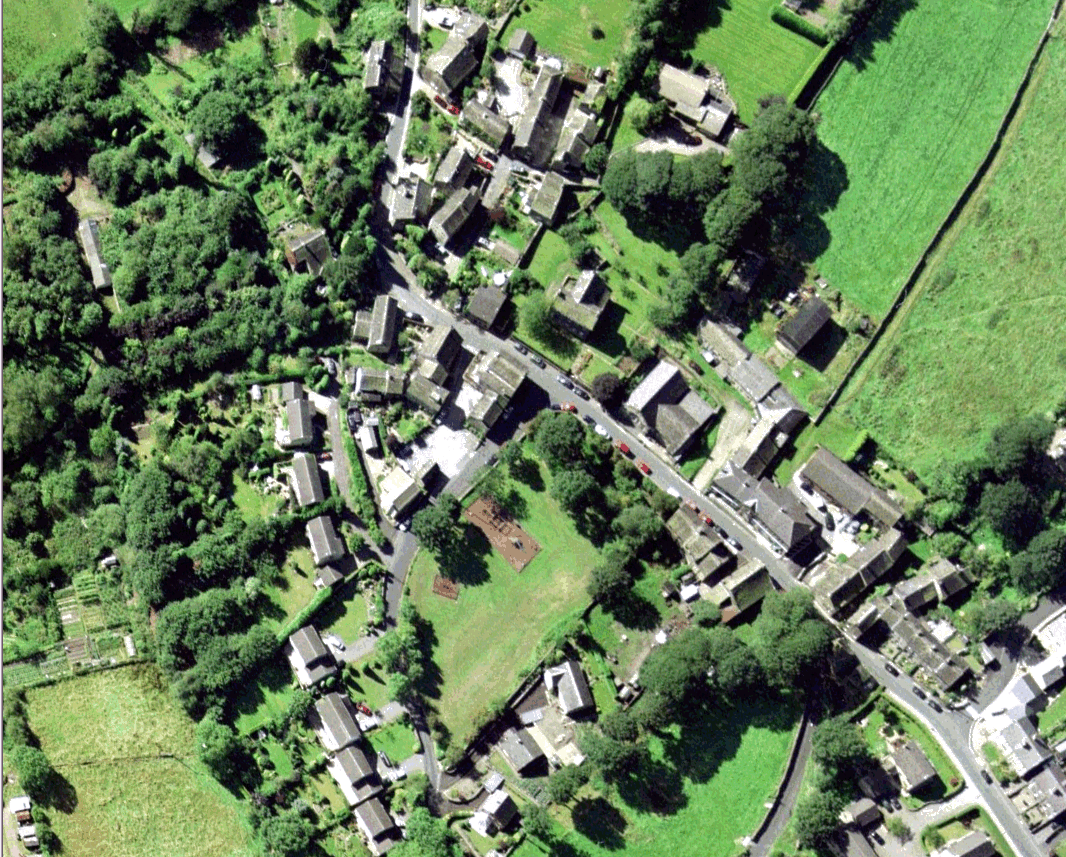
- Aerial image of Wooldale village centre

- Location within West Yorkshire
- Civil parish: Holme Valley
- Metropolitan borough: Kirklees
- Metropolitan county: West Yorkshire
- Region: Yorkshire and the Humber
- Country: England
- Sovereign state: United Kingdom
- Police: West Yorkshire
- Fire: West Yorkshire
- Ambulance: Yorkshire

Wooldale is a village in the civil parish of Holme Valley, in the Kirklees district, in the county of West Yorkshire, England. It is nestled on a hill, overlooking the Kirkroyds area of New Mill. It has a population of 2,420.

== Co-operative Society ==
The village was the base of the Wooldale Co-operative Society, a small consumer co-operative. The Society operated three convenience stores in the Holme Valley one in Wooldale and the others were in the villages of New Mill and Thongsbridge. The Society was founded in 1886.

The Society was a member of the CRTG (Co-operative Retail Trading Group) and a corporate member of the Co-operative Group. It had agreements with the United Co-op and later the Co-operative Group for stock distribution and promotions.

In 2017 the society was taken over by the Central England Co-operative Society.

== Sport ==
Wooldale Wanderers AFC are the local football team, competing in the Huddersfield District League and play at Westfield Park just outside the village centre.

== History ==
Wooldale was formerly a township in the parish of Kirk-Burton, in 1866 Wooldale became a separate civil parish, on 1 April 1921 the parish was abolished and merged with Holmfirth. In 1911 the parish had a population of 3,869.
