= Wooldale Co-operative Society =

Former consumer co-operative in the United Kingdom

Wooldale Co-operative Society Limited

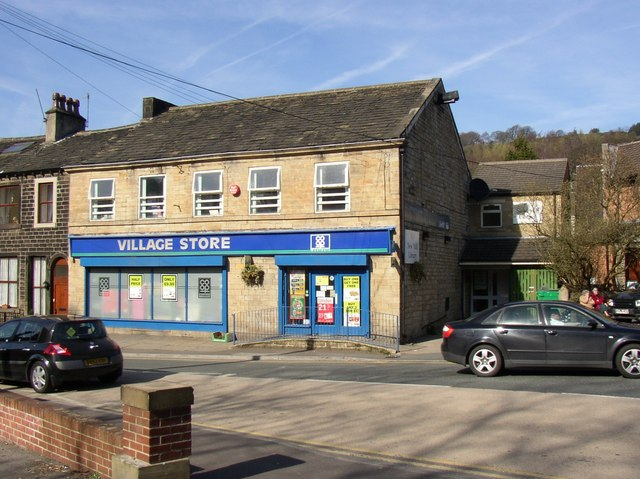
- New Mill Village Store shares a building with a library
- Company type: Consumers' cooperative
- Industry: Retail (Grocery), Post office
- Founded: 27 September 1886
- Defunct
- Headquarters: Wooldale, Holmfirth, United Kingdom
- Area served: Holme Valley, West Yorkshire
- Revenue: £2,371,633 (2006)
- Members: 1,570 (2006)
- Website: wooldale.coop

Wooldale Co-operative Society was a small consumer co-operative based in the West Yorkshire village of Wooldale. The Society operated three convenience stores in the Holme Valley villages of New Mill, Thongsbridge and Wooldale. It was founded as the Wooldale Industrial and Equitable Co-operative Society in 1886, changing its name in 1989.

The Society was a member of the Co-operative Retail Trading Group and a corporate member of The Co-operative Group. It also had agreements with the Co-operative Group for stock distribution and promotions.

In 2006, the Society met with its small neighbouring societies, Shepley Co-operative Society and Highburton Co-operative Society with a view to merger. This would have reduced costs and increased turnover by adding two further stores to its portfolio and combining administrative operations. These talks did not result positively and in the spring of 2007, the Society approached Rochdale-based United Co-operatives on the possibilities of a merger. The boards of the two societies agreed to a merger, but in a Special General Meeting held on 11 May 2007, the proposal was defeated by the members of the Wooldale society on a near 2:1 ratio.

On 26 May 2017, members of the society voted for a merger with the neighbouring Central England Co-operative, with whom the Shepley society had merged a few years prior.

== See also ==
- British co-operative movement
- Credit unions in the United Kingdom
