= Hepworth, West Yorkshire =

Village in West Yorkshire, England

Coordinates: 53.556900°N 1.754400°W

Hepworth
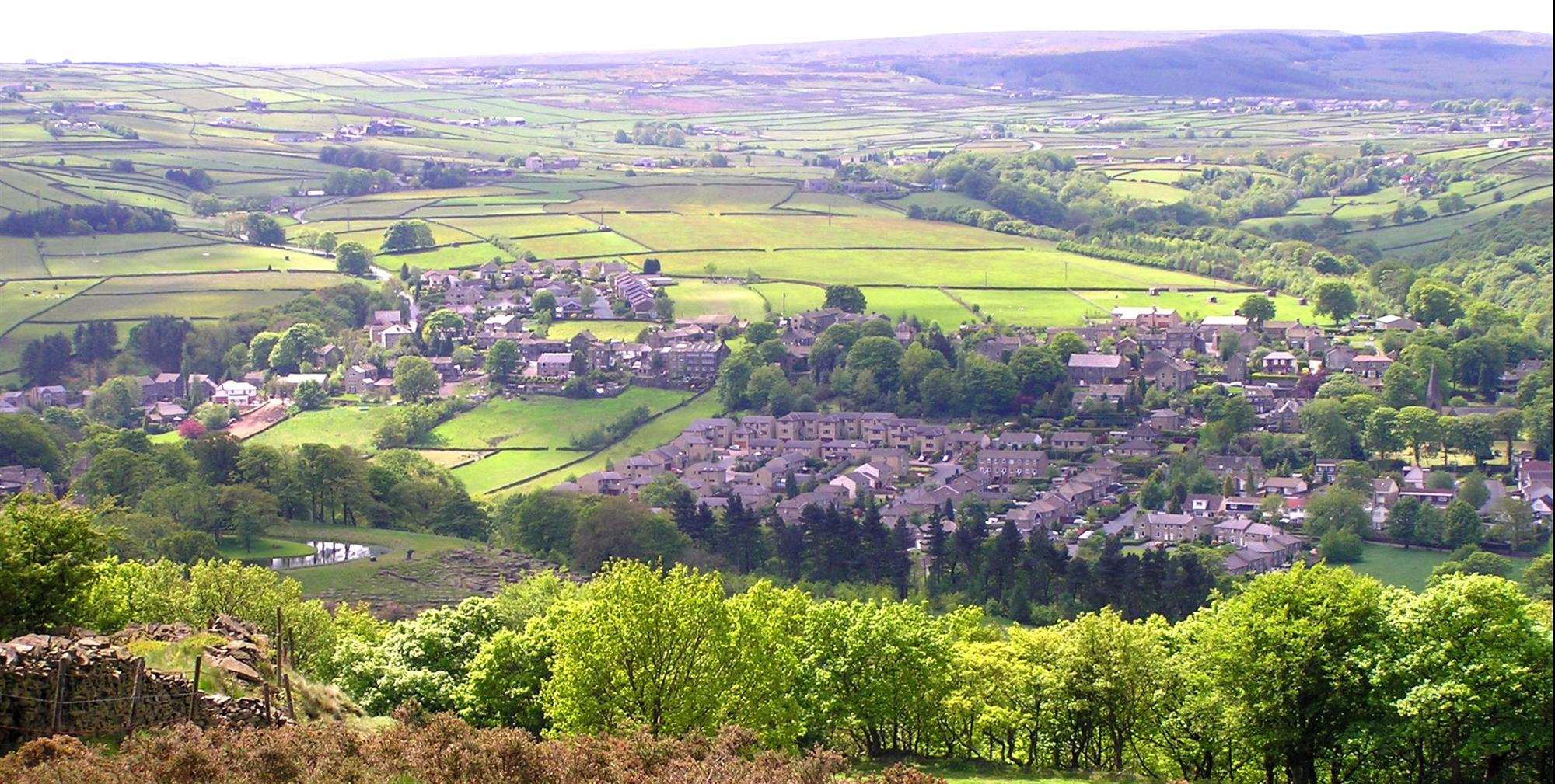
- View of Hepworth from Tenter Hill

- Location within West Yorkshire
- OS grid reference: SE163067
- Civil parish: Holme Valley
- Metropolitan borough: Kirklees
- Metropolitan county: West Yorkshire
- Region: Yorkshire and the Humber
- Country: England
- Sovereign state: United Kingdom
- Post town: HOLMFIRTH
- Postcode district: HD9
- Police: West Yorkshire
- Fire: West Yorkshire
- Ambulance: Yorkshire
- UK Parliament: Colne Valley

Hepworth is a village in the civil parish of Holme Valley, in the metropolitan borough of Kirklees, in West Yorkshire, England. It is southeast of Holmfirth and southwest of Jackson Bridge.

Although it started as a fairly small hamlet it has grown considerably through the 1980s and 1990s with new housing and small businesses. It has been extensively used as one of the locations in the BBC's long-running comedy series Last of the Summer Wine, much of which has centred on the village pub the 'Butchers Arms', which provides a central meeting place for the village residents.

== History ==
=== Toponymy ===
The name Hepworth is Anglo-Saxon. H. T. Moorhouse states, in his History of Kirkburton and the Graveship of Holme (1861), that the name is derived from the Anglo-Saxon “Hep” meaning high and “worth” meaning place of residence. The Oxford Dictionary of Place Names has –worth as meaning an enclosure, hence enclosure of a man called Heppa. In the Domesday Book it is given the name Heppeuuord and is described as the King’s land with steep streets.

=== Early history ===
In medieval times the wool trade was the chief source of employment. During the fourteenth century Hepworth was in the parish of Kirkburton, which covered around fifty square miles. It incorporated the townships of Wooldale, Cumberworth, Cartworth, Fulstone, Shepley amongst others. In the fifteenth century a church was built at Holmfirth and during the Civil War a petition was submitted asking for Holmfirth to be made a parish in its own right. The petition was granted by Minister Gamaliel Abraham in 1651. Hepworth and its neighbour Scholes thus became part of the parish of Holmfirth.

=== The Great Plague ===
In 1665 – 1666 the Great Plague struck England. It wrought devastation in London, then spread across the country. Hepworth was the most northerly point that it reached. According to local legend it is supposed to have come in on cloth brought from London.

In an effort to save the village the residents split the village into two parts at Barracks Fold. Those that were infected remained, isolated from the world, in one half. Thirteen of the residents died from the disease, which was a considerable percentage of the population in such a small village and thirteen trees were planted to remember them. The trees still stand today, by the local football pitch. Two subsequently fell down and in 2004, replacements were planted at a small ceremony by Parish Councillor, Ruth Jackson. The end of the plague in Hepworth is still commemorated on the last Monday in June every year with Hepworth Feast.

=== Hepworth's spiritual founding ===
In 1777 a mighty storm caused the River Holme to swell and flood over its banks in Holmfirth, sweeping away people and property, including the parish church. It was rebuilt in its present state a year later with funding from local clothiers. During this period Wesleyan evangelicals were active in the Holme Valley and Hepworth. They encouraged the local residents to demand that church services be held at the Old Town School. This led to Hepworth becoming a separate parish. In 1863 Holy Trinity Church was consecrated by the Bishop of Ripon further boosting spirituality in Hepworth.

=== 19th century ===
In 1822 Thomas Langdale recorded a population of 1,048 for the township of Hepworth.

=== Civil parish ===
Hepworth was formerly a township and chapelry in the parish of Kirkburton, from 1866 Hepworth was a civil parish in its own right, on 1 April 1938 the parish was abolished and merged with Holmfirth, part also went to form Dunford. In 1931 the parish had a population of 840.

== Local village events ==
Hepworth has a range of events on a regular basis. They are mainly arranged by the Hepworth Community Association or the local church. These include:-

=== Hepworth Feast ===
Hepworth Feast is held every year on the last Monday of June. It commemorates the end of the 1665 Great Plague in Hepworth. Traditionally a pig is roasted and this is now done by The Butchers Arms pub during the evening family gathering in the village. During the afternoon a procession of villagers walk from Hepworth to Scholes and back, in a circular trip, accompanied by Hepworth Brass Band. The local school children are given a tea after the procession and in the evening the children take part in races at the Recreation Ground. Since 2004 the Hepworth Feast Committee have sought to make the event more family oriented. They have introduced stalls for children on the main street, including some more traditional Punch and Judy, coconut-shies and magicians acts. There is also an exhibition of historical photographs from Hepworth in the Village Hall.

=== Hepworth Garden Trail ===
Hepworth Garden Trail was organised by Hepworth Church and was held every two years during early July until 2012. Selected gardens in the village are opened to the public. Those that can be viewed are marked on a map of the village. Many of the gardens listed feature plant stalls or sell refreshments.

=== Hepworth Garden Show ===
Hepworth Garden Show is held annually on the first Saturday in September at the Village Hall. Fruit, vegetables and flowers are displayed and judged upstairs. Children’s exhibits, cookery and handicrafts are displayed and judged downstairs. After the show any exhibits left behind are auctioned off at the local Sports and Social Club.

== Sport ==
The village football team Hepworth United competes in the Sheffield & Hallamshire County Senior Football League and play at Far Lane, just outside the village centre.

== Location grid ==
The above grid is based on exact directions rather than close to.
