= Hade Edge =

Village in West Yorkshire, England

Coordinates: 53.543546°N 1.781116°W

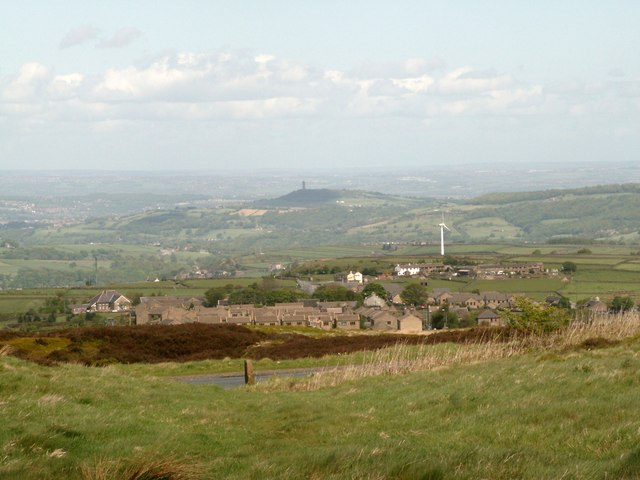
- Hade Edge, from Bare Bones Road looking towards Victoria Tower, Castle Hill

- Location within West Yorkshire
- OS grid reference: SE147054
- Metropolitan borough: Kirklees
- Metropolitan county: West Yorkshire
- Region: Yorkshire and the Humber
- Country: England
- Sovereign state: United Kingdom
- Post town: Holmfirth
- Postcode district: HD9
- Dialling code: 01484
- Police: West Yorkshire
- Fire: West Yorkshire
- Ambulance: Yorkshire
- UK Parliament: Colne Valley
- Website: Village website

Hade Edge is a small village to the south of Holmfirth and south-west of Hepworth in West Yorkshire, England. It is in the parish of Holme Valley and the metropolitan borough of Kirklees.

Although it started as a fairly small hamlet it has grown considerably throughout the 1980s and 1990s with new housing.

== History ==
=== School ===
The first school opened in 1882 in the Sunday School, not moving to the current building until the early 1900s. The present school, Hade Edge Junior and Infant and Nursery School, is coeducational and has four classes.

=== Shops ===
There was a Co-op store on the corner of Greave Road and Dunford road which closed in the 1950s. A fish and chip shop at the top of Greave road closed soon after. A grocery store and post office was the last to close in 1989. A sweet shop was operated from a private house opposite the band room, a focus for village children after school.

=== Church ===
There was a church in Magnum that was demolished in the 1950s, along with most of the other buildings. The village is in the Parish of Holy Trinity, Holmfirth and there is a Methodist Church on Dunford Road.

=== Public Houses ===
At the peak there were 8 pubs in the area serving the many quarry workers, long gone pubs now demolished, or turned into residences, included the Sportsman, Roundclose, Junction, Weathercock and Moorcock Inns and the Road End Pub.

=== Quarrying ===
By 1861 Magnum Bonum Quarry employed over 60 people producing stone blocks for buildings and stone flagstones for railway station platforms. A hamlet of workers homes developed with a church and public house. Other quarries were Sans Pareil and Ne Plus Ultra.

The nearest registered common land is Magnum Bonum, about half a mile south of the village.

=== Hade Edge Brass Band ===
The band was formed in July 1908 by some members of the Sunday School committee using second hand instruments from a former district band, the Old Moss Band. Various fund raising activities meant that many new instruments had been purchased by the time that the band won its first prize at Stalybridge in 1914. The band has gone from strength to strength and the current bandroom was opened in June 2007. The band was sponsored in the 1990s by Edgar Dickinson, one of the two brothers who started the Longley Farm dairy company in the village in 1948.

=== Football ===
The earliest records show that Hade Edge had a team in the Holmfirth and District Association Football League in the 1909/10 season. Currently, Hade Edge AFC plays at their ground off Dunford Road. They have senior teams in the Huddersfield and District Saturday League, which is predominantly made up of Coal Miners from Penistone, along with junior teams and training.

=== Weather ===
In September 2015, a village weather station was commissioned and made available via Weather Underground and MetOffice. Readings include current, average, minimum and maximum for wind speed, rainfall, barometric pressure, temperature, dewpoint, and wind direction. Real-time and historic data is served via wireless instruments to an NG96Y weather station connected to a Raspberry Pi.
