= Longley Farm =

British food company

- Type: Private
- Industry: Food
- Founders: Joseph and Edgar Dickinson
- Headquarters: Hade Edge; Holmfirth; Huddersfield, England
- Key people: Jimmy Dickinson (CEO)
- Products: Dairy
- Number of employees: 100–110
- Website: www.longleyfarm.com

Longley Farm is a Yorkshire based company that produces a variety of dairy products. The company was founded in 1948 by Joseph Dickinson and his brother Edgar Dickinson. The company is named after the farm in Hade Edge, near Holmfirth in West Yorkshire at which the dairy was formerly based, All its products are popular across the North of England with certain key products - cottage cheese in particular - being popular nationally, and also internationally.

== History ==
The company was founded in 1948 by Joseph and Edgar Dickinson after they inherited a 30-acre (12 ha) farm near to Holmfirth in the West Riding of Yorkshire. Initially just having a few head of cattle, they farmed the land and with their herd of Jersey cows they first started producing cream in 1954 after wartime food rationing had ended. In the early days of the venture, Joseph Dickinson would deliver products to the Morrisons market stall run by Ken Morrison in Bradford.

The company branched out into making yoghurts and after Joseph Dickinson had visited an American farm in the early 1970s, they also started making cottage cheese. To start with, the cheese was made in tin baths and stirred with hay rakes before more suitable processes were adopted. Longley Farm were the first European company to make cottage cheese on an industrial scale and sell it. The cottage cheese brand is very popular in France, despite initial predictions that you could not sell a non-French sounding cheese to the French.

As well as owning their own 250-strong herd of Jersey cattle, the company takes milk from another 80 farms across Yorkshire, of which, 25 are Jersey herds. They process over 8,800,000 imperial gallons; 11,000,000 US gallons (40,000,000 L) of milk per year.

The first commercial wind turbine in Great Britain was installed at Longley Farm in 1986. It was rated at 90 kW and stood at over 105 feet (32 m) high. It was replaced in September 2015 with a newer model which is 151 feet (46 m) tall and produces 400 kWh.

In 1990, the brothers Dickinson bought a 1,000-acre (400 ha) farm near Barnsley. All the cattle were moved to this farm and as such, the dairy processing was moved there too. Production of cheese and yoghurts was retained at the Longley Farm site.

Both Dickinson brothers retired in 1997 and Joseph's son, Jimmy, took over running the business.

== Food scare ==
In 2003, three Yorkshire pensioners from the Huddersfield area, died from a strain of listeria found to be in butter that they had consumed. As a precaution, Longley Farm withdrew certain products from sale and recalled other batches of stock although an investigation later determined that the farm was clean and the poisoning outbreak had nothing whatsoever to do with any Longley Farm product. It was the first health scare connected with the company in its 55-year history.

== Popularity ==
The firm's products regularly feature in the winners category for dairy products at the Great Yorkshire Show and have grown to be popular outside of Yorkshire with many people enjoying them internationally. Some of the supermarkets in the United Kingdom sell Longley Farm products throughout Yorkshire, with Morrisons and Asda selling them nationally. The Telegraph described the yoghurts produced by Longley farm as being "...natural, exceptionally good and simple fruit yogurts from this small dairy."
