= Fulstone =

Coordinates: 53.5817°N 1.7367°W

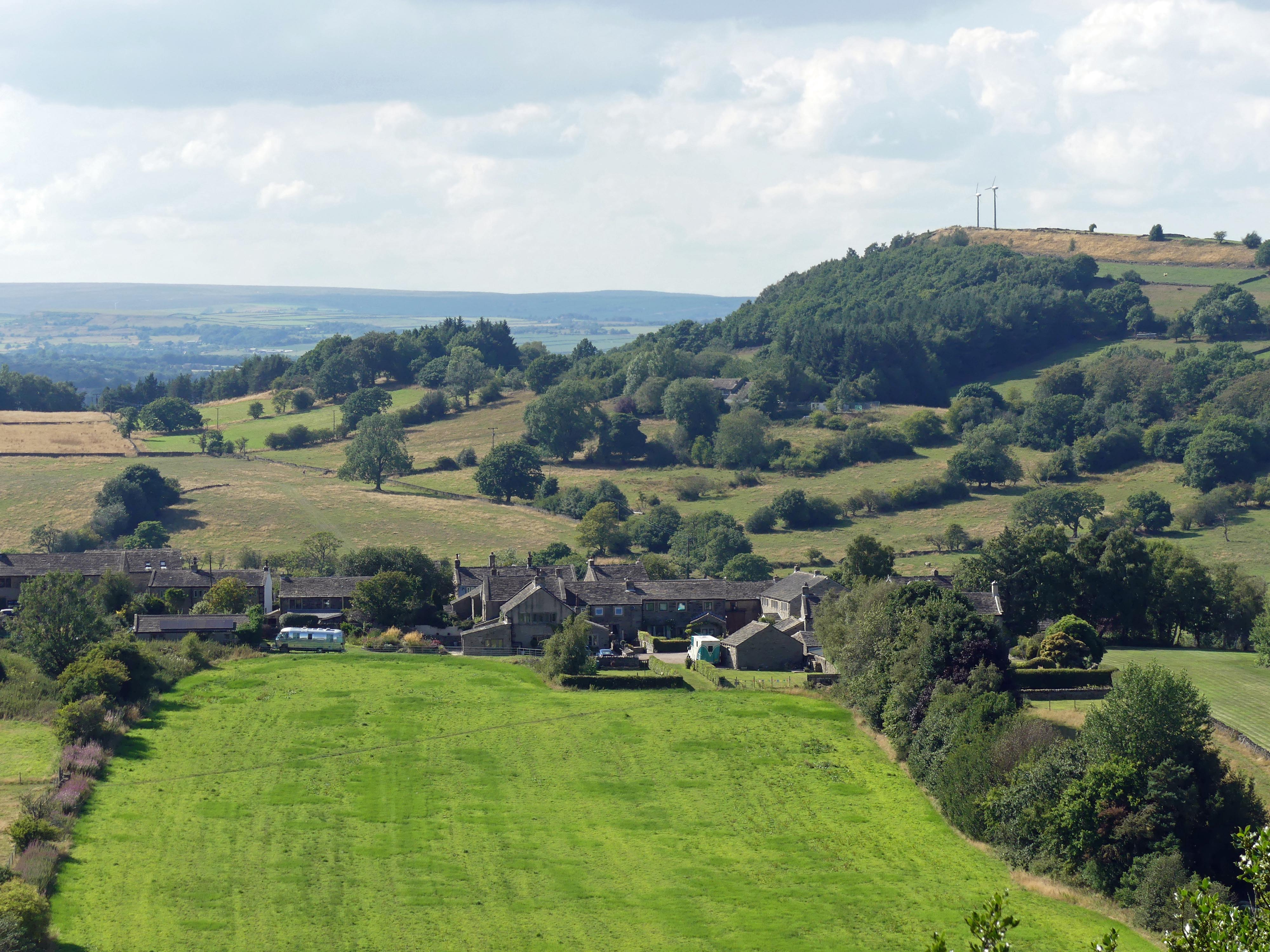

- Location within West Yorkshire
- Civil parish: Holme Valley
- Metropolitan borough: Kirklees
- Metropolitan county: West Yorkshire
- Region: Yorkshire and the Humber
- Country: England
- Sovereign state: United Kingdom

Fulstone is a village in the civil parish of Holme Valley, in the Kirklees district, in the county of West Yorkshire, England. It is about 5 miles (8.0 km) from Huddersfield. Until 1974, it was in the West Riding of Yorkshire. In 1931, the parish had a population of 2127.

== History ==
The name "Fulstone" means 'Fugol's farm/settlement'. Fulstone was recorded in the Domesday Book as Fugelestun. Fulstone was formerly a township in the parish of Kirkburton, in 1866 Fulstone became a separate civil parish, from 1894 to 1895 Fulstone was an urban district, from 1895 to 1938 it was in New Mill Urban District, on 1 April 1938 the parish was abolished and merged with Holmefirth, part also went to form Dunford and Fulstone became part of Holmfirth Urban District. In 1974 Fulstone became part of the metropolitan borough of Kirklees and the metropolitan county of West Yorkshire.

Fulstone once had a Methodist church, it is now a private dwelling.
