= Totties =

Hamlet in West Yorkshire, England

Coordinates: 53.570°N 1.763°W

Totties is a hamlet between New Mill and Scholes near Holmfirth in West Yorkshire, England.

Although it consists of no more than 70–80 houses, it has within the hamlet three plant and tree nurseries, an egg production facility, and a chicken farm, plus two local football pitches.

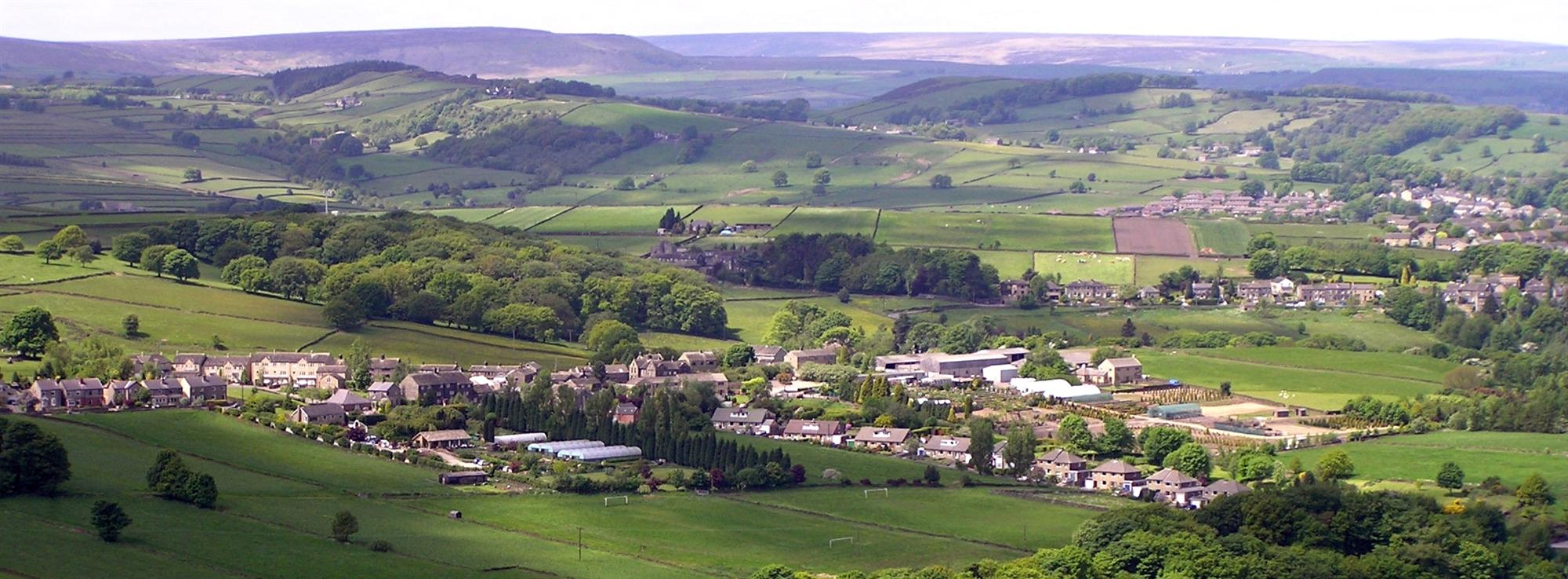
View of Totties from Tenter Hill
