= New Mill, West Yorkshire =

Village in West Yorkshire, England

Coordinates: 53.574°N 1.750°W

New Mill
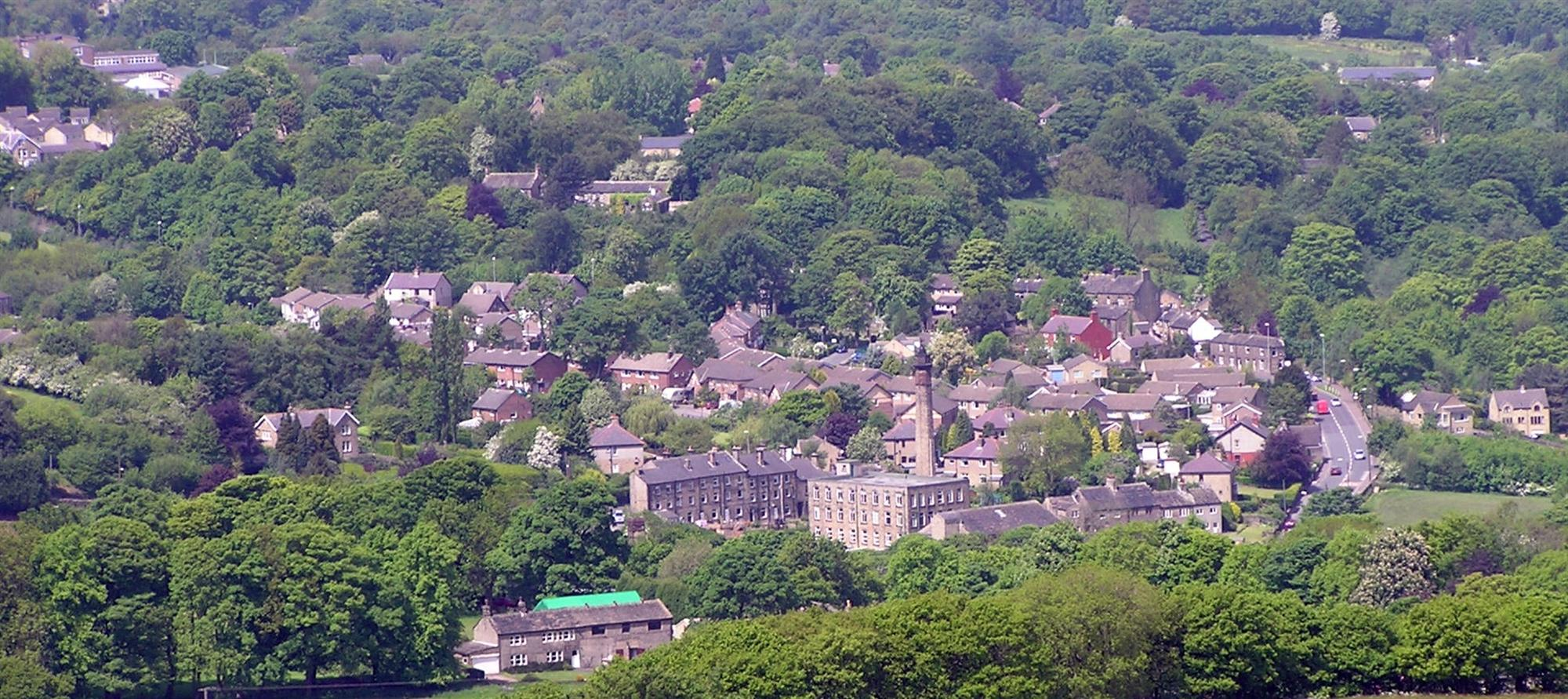
- New Mill and Lydgate, with the former Moorhouse & Brook mill in the centre

- Location within West Yorkshire
- Civil parish: Holme Valley
- Metropolitan borough: Kirklees
- Metropolitan county: West Yorkshire
- Region: Yorkshire and the Humber
- Country: England
- Sovereign state: United Kingdom

New Mill is a village in the civil parish of Holme Valley, in the metropolitan borough of Kirklees, in West Yorkshire, England, near the town of Holmfirth. The village had a population of 1,259 (with Fulstone) in the 2001 census. The village is 2 miles (3.2 km) east of Holmfirth and 6 miles (9.7 km) south of Huddersfield.

The centre of the village is now on the crossroads of the Huddersfield – Sheffield A616 and Barnsley – Manchester A635 roads. There is a Post Office, one Indian restaurant, a branch of the local Co-op and 2 pharmacies plus other amenities all centred on the crossroads. The village centre used to be sited slightly further east near the church on Sude Hill.

There were textile mills in the village such as Moorhouse & Brook, on Greenhill Bank Road, and Bower and Roebuck, nestling in the valley just off the A616 Sheffield Road. With the decline in traditional heavy woollen industries Moorhouse & Brook has now closed. Bower & Roebuck continues to produce textiles from the site in New Mill, while Moorhouse & Brook's mill has been demolished and a new housing development built on the site.

The village is also home to the New Mill Male Voice Choir, which was established in 1991.

New Mill was created an urban district of the West Riding of Yorkshire in 1895, and covered the parishes of Fulstone, Hepworth and Scholes. The urban district was abolished in 1938 by a County Review Order which saw the district and parishes merged into the urban district and parish of Holmfirth, which has been since included in Kirklees, West Yorkshire and renamed Holme Valley.
