= Jackson Bridge =

Coordinates: 53.563°N 1.753°W

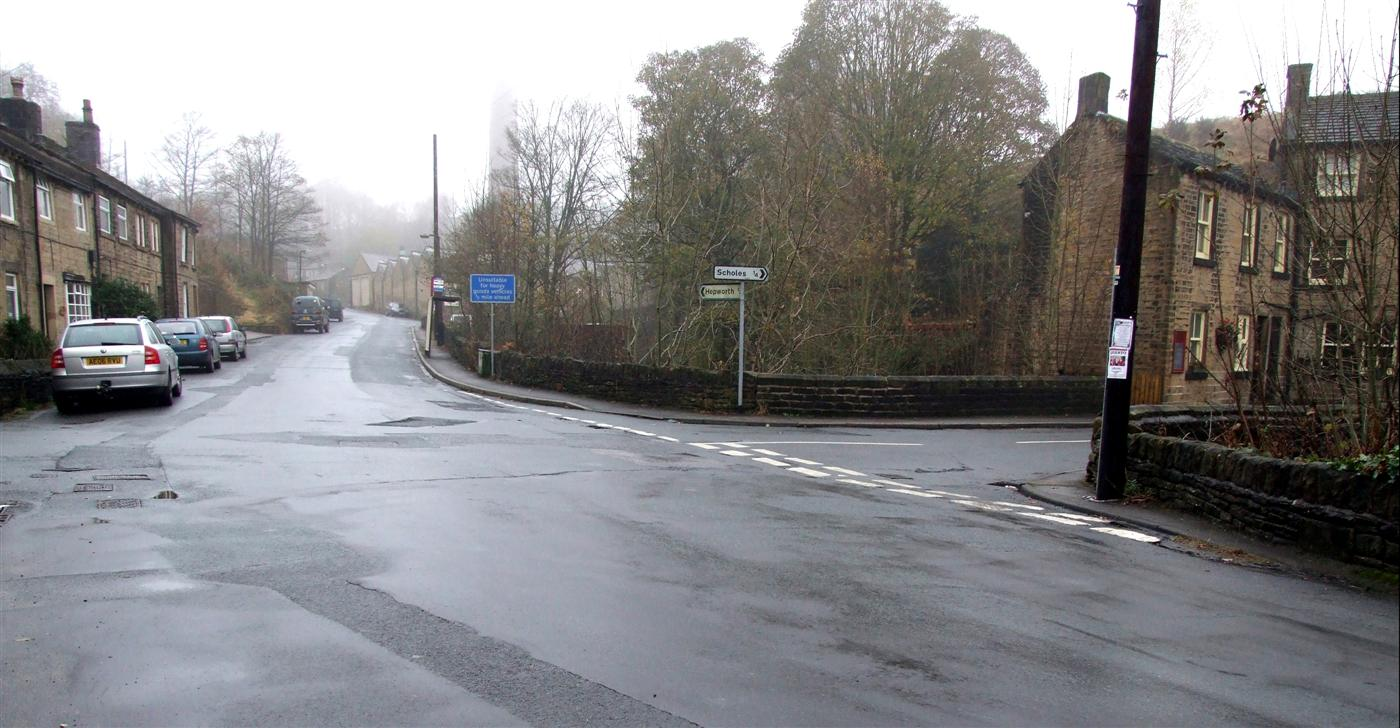
- Scholes Road Junction

- Location within West Yorkshire
- Population: 1,380 (for Hepworth & Jackson bridge)
- OS grid reference: SE164075
- Civil parish: Holme Valley
- Metropolitan borough: Kirklees
- Metropolitan county: West Yorkshire
- Region: Yorkshire and the Humber
- Country: England
- Sovereign state: United Kingdom
- Post town: HOLMFIRTH
- Postcode district: HD9
- Dialling code: 01484
- Police: West Yorkshire
- Fire: West Yorkshire
- Ambulance: Yorkshire
- UK Parliament: Colne Valley

Jackson Bridge is a small village in the civil parish of Holme Valley in the Metropolitan Borough of Kirklees in West Yorkshire, England and within the postal district of Holmfirth. It is situated next to the A616, Huddersfield to Penistone, road.

== Description ==
Jackson Bridge is the location for the pub which Clegg's house is situated behind in the BBC's long-running comedy Last of the Summer Wine. It is located close to the edge of the Peak District National Park.

Dobroyd Mills, which once dominated the village, was a major contributor to the West Yorkshire textile industry, producing fine worsted cloth for export. At the end of their use the mill buildings housed a fine yarn spinners, John Woodheads (Dobroyd Mills) Ltd, plus other small businesses such as computer services and facilities, engineering, sheet metal works and motor vehicle services. After a period of dereliction, the complex was demolished in 2020.

Most of the surrounding countryside is given over to agriculture, significantly milk cattle and sheep.

The village is known as 'Jigby' by locals.

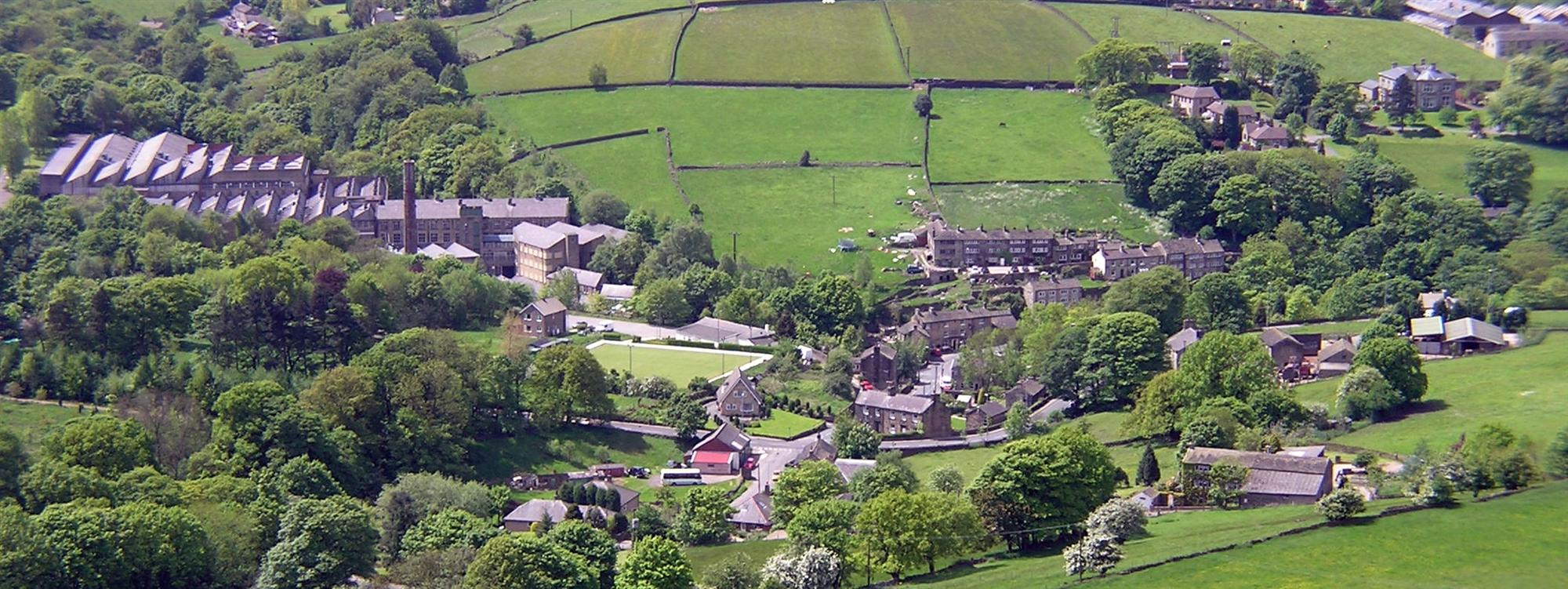
Jackson Bridge, showing Dobroyd Mill, viewed from mount

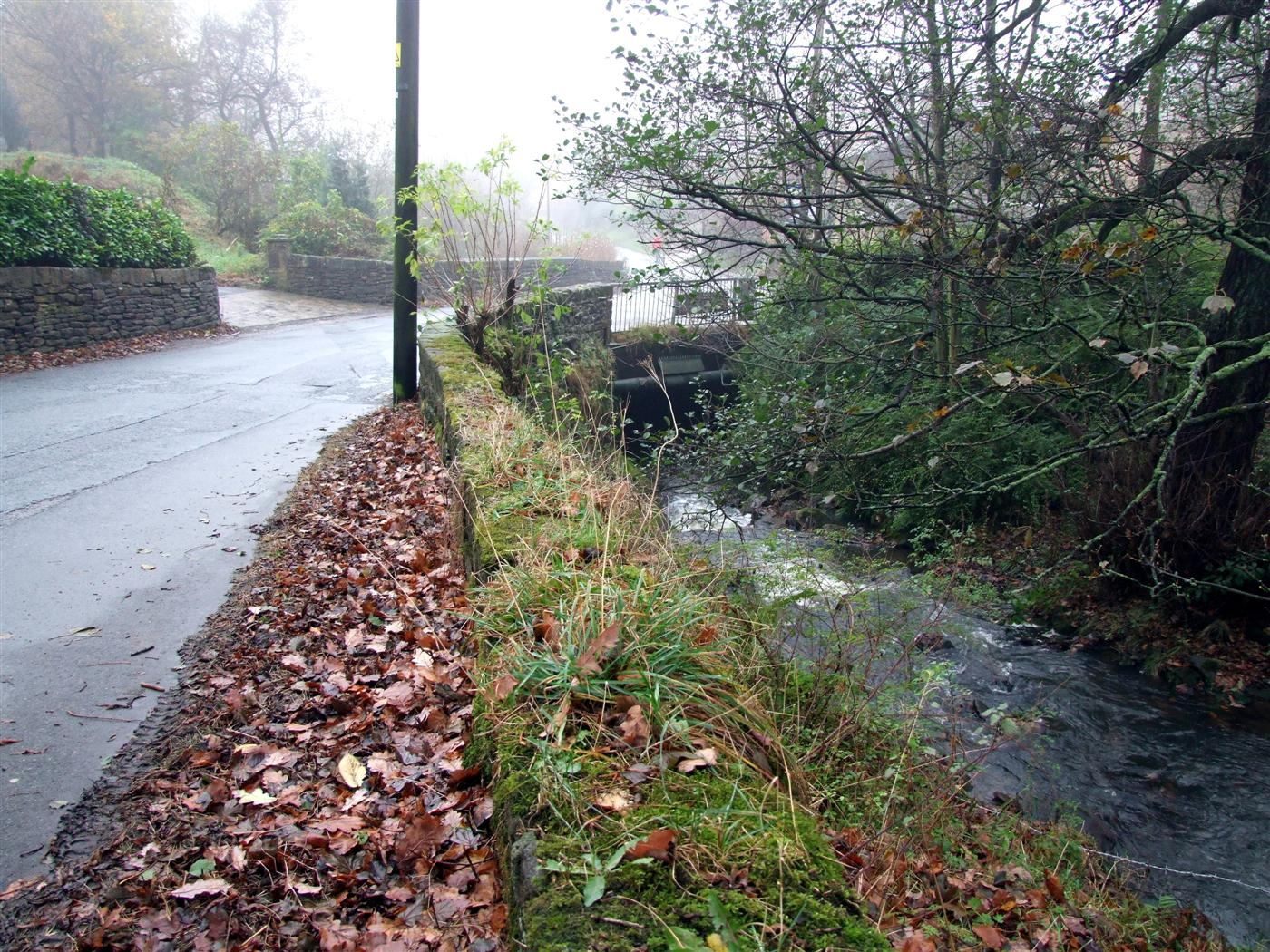
Jackson Bridge - Hepworth Road road bridge

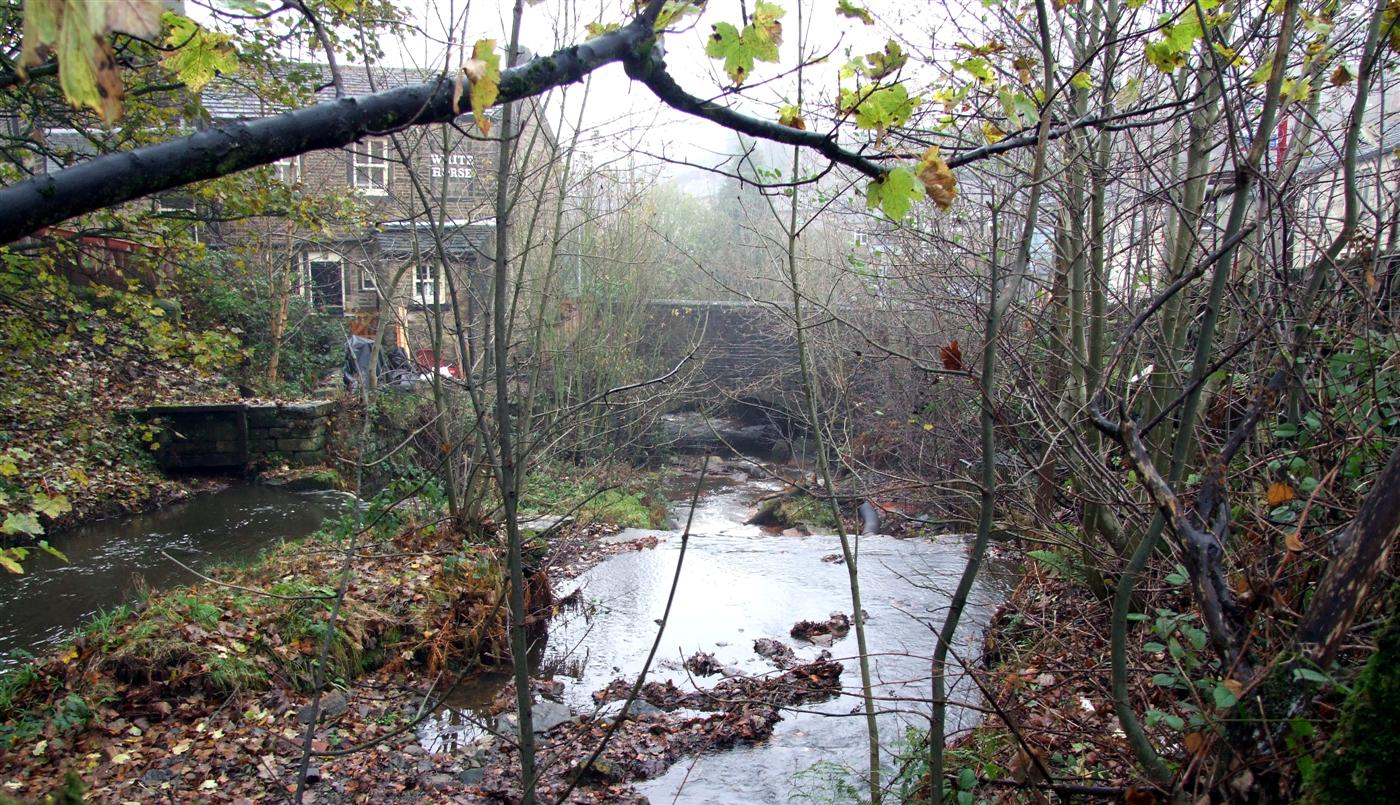
Jackson Bridge road-bridge showing passage of Jackson Bridge Dike

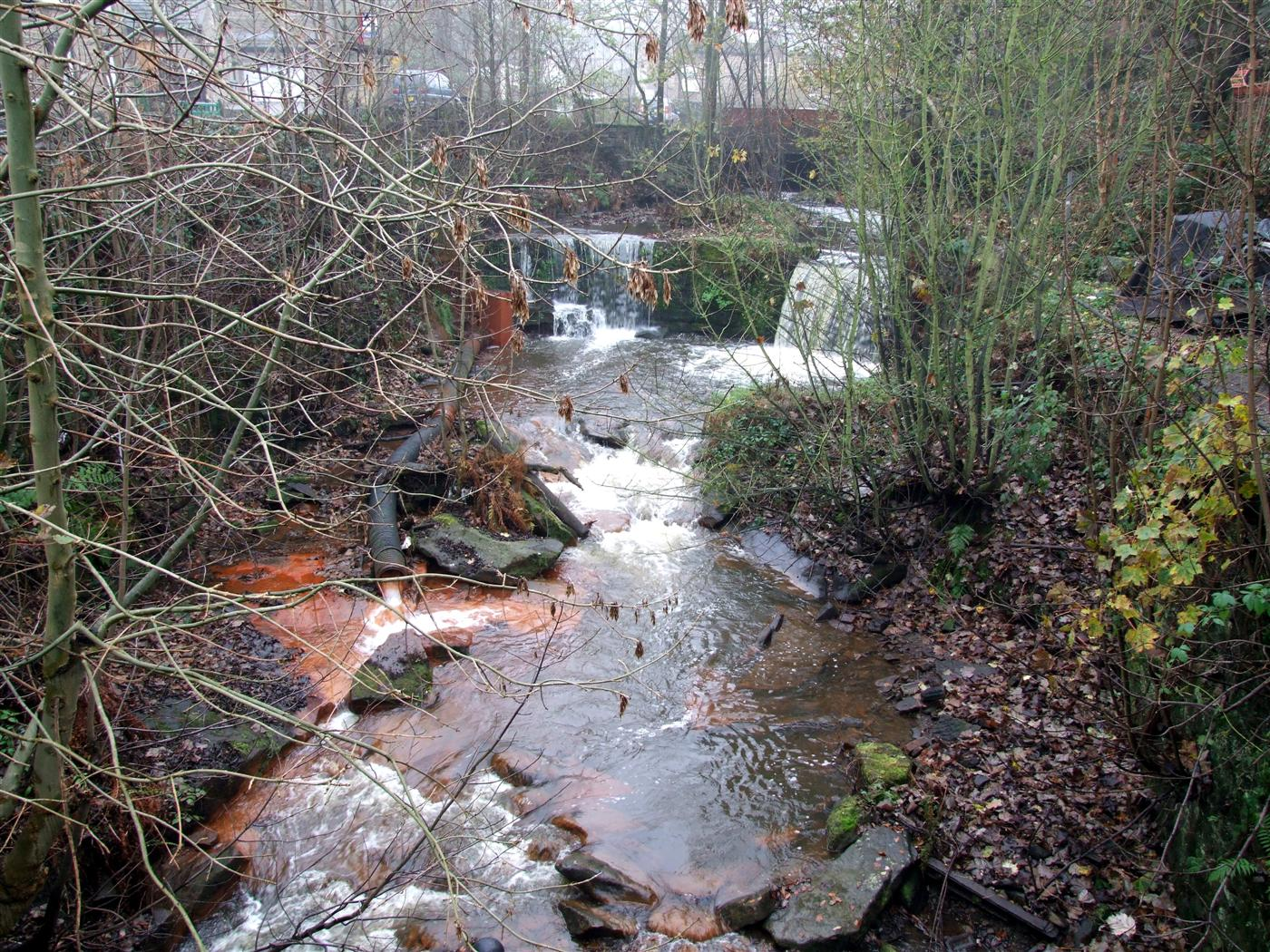
Upstream view from Jackson Bridge road bridge

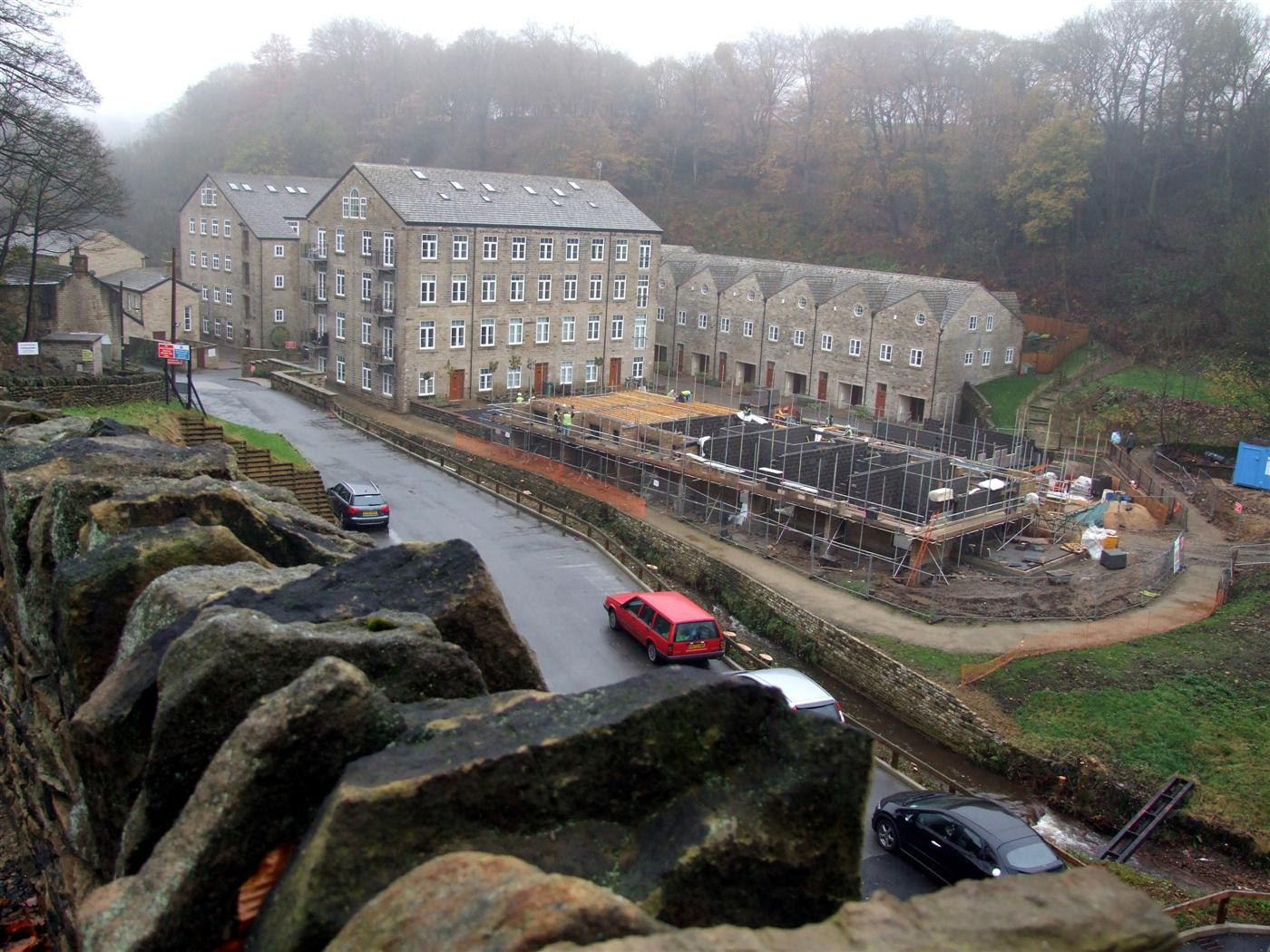
Wildspur Mill conversion to housing (in New Mill)
