= Holme Valley =

Civil parish in West Yorkshire, England

Coordinates: 53°35′N 01°48′W

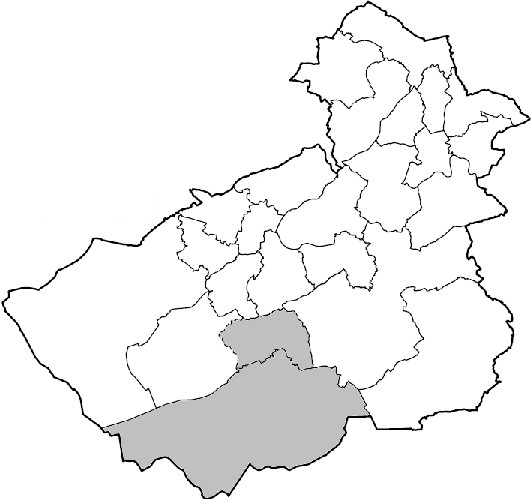
- Location of Holme Valley within Kirklees

- Location within West Yorkshire
- Population: 34,680 (2011 census)
- Civil parish: Holme Valley
- Metropolitan borough: Kirklees
- Metropolitan county: West Yorkshire
- Region: Yorkshire and the Humber
- Country: England
- Sovereign state: United Kingdom

Holme Valley, formerly Holmfirth, is a large civil parish in the metropolitan borough of Kirklees in West Yorkshire, England. The parish is the successor to the Holmfirth urban district. It has a population of 25,049 (2001 census), increasing to 34,680 for the two wards in the 2011 Census. Its administrative centre is in Holmfirth. Other sizeable settlements in the parish include, Brockholes, Honley and New Mill. It is named from the River Holme that runs through the parish.

== History ==
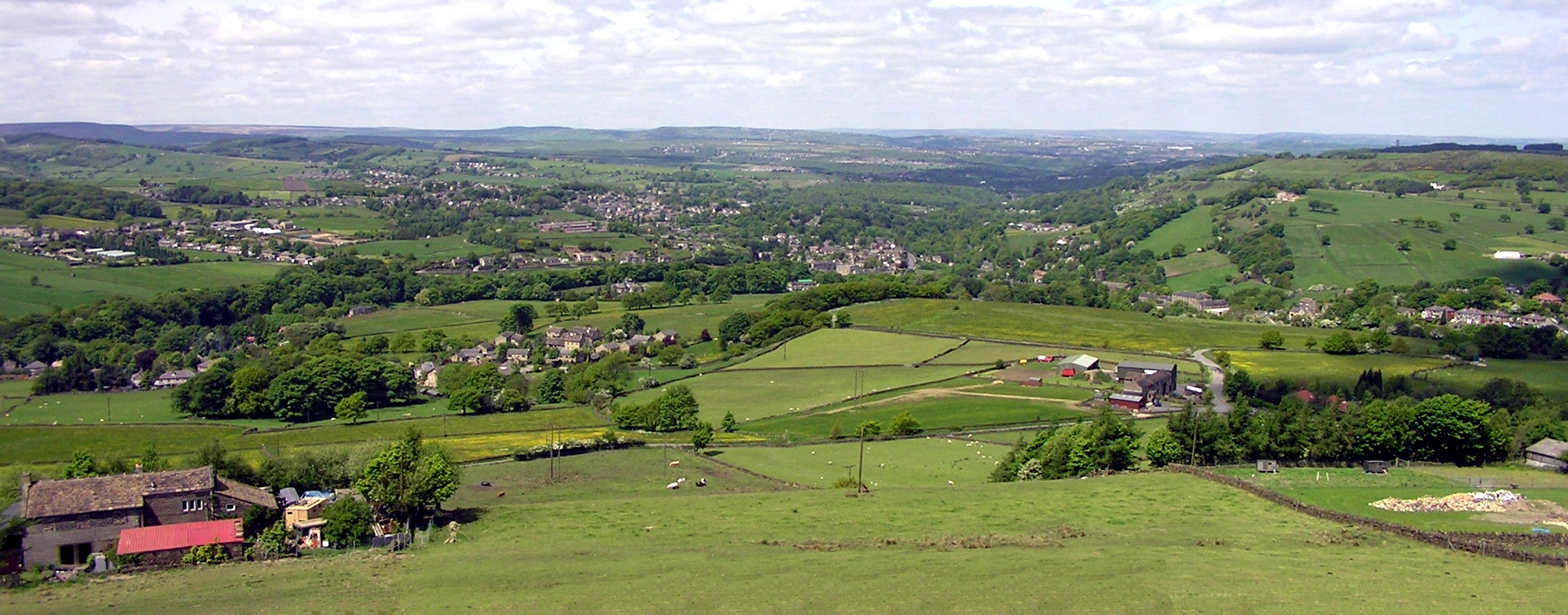
Upper Holme Valley, looking north and westerly, from Mount at Jackson Bridge over Totties and New Mill to Honley and Crosland Moor.

An urban district covering Holmfirth was created in 1894 by the Local Government Act 1894 and then in 1938, under a County Review Order, absorbed parts of the Holme, Honley, New Mill, South Crosland and Thurstonland and Farnley Tyas urban districts, keeping the name.

Under the Local Government Act 1972, the Holmfirth urban district was abolished on 1 April 1974, but its area was retained as a single civil parish with a parish council. On 1 April 1976 the parish was renamed from "Holmfirth" to "Holme Valley".

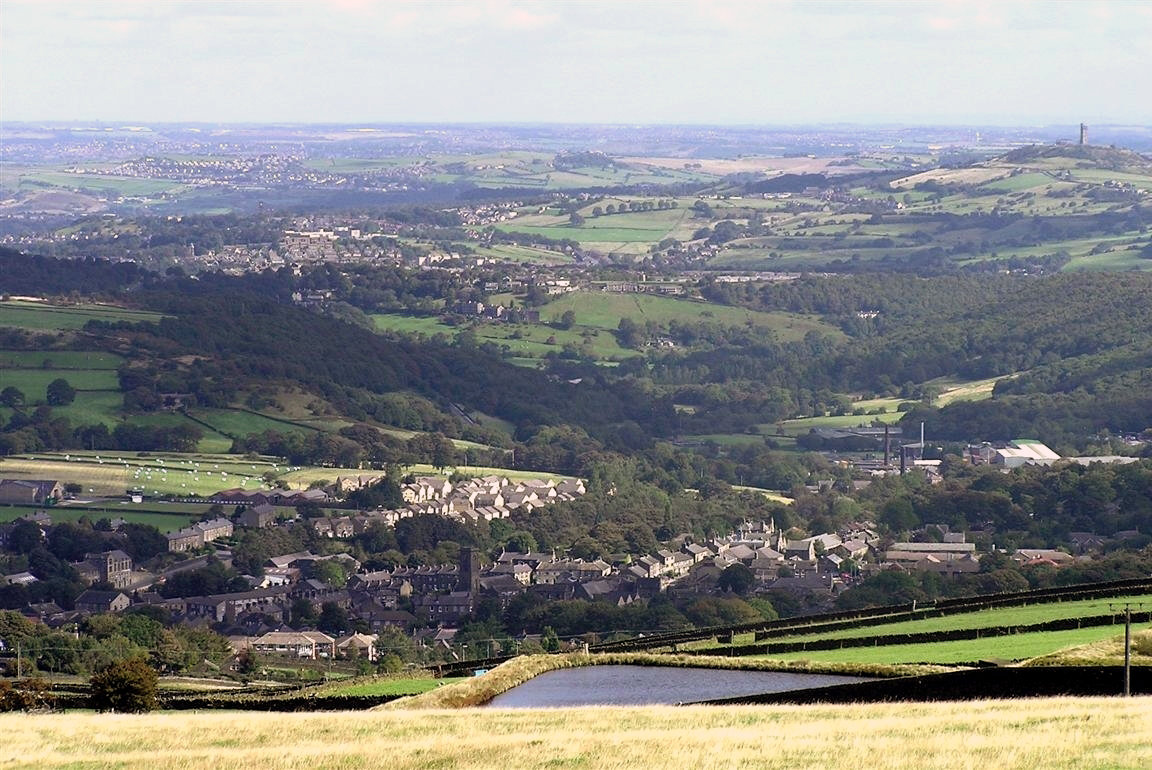
Lower end of the Holme Valley, looking north from Meltham across Netherton and Crosland Moor to Huddersfield and beyond towards Dewsbury.

== See also ==
- Holme Valley Mountain Rescue Team
