= Listed buildings in Meltham =

Meltham is a civil parish in the metropolitan borough of Kirklees, West Yorkshire, England. It contains 60 listed buildings that are recorded in the National Heritage List for England. Of these, one is listed at Grade II*, the middle of the three grades, and the others are at Grade II, the lowest grade. The parish contains the village of Meltham and the smaller settlements of Helme and Wilshaw, and is otherwise rural. Until the Industrial Revolution the economy of the parish depended mainly on agriculture, and many of the listed buildings are farmhouses and farm buildings. The Industrial Revolution brought the textile industry to the area, and this was initially a domestic process. Many of the listed buildings are weavers' cottages and other houses used for spinning wool, and these are characterised by long rows of mullioned windows, mainly in the upper storeys. Most of the listed buildings are constructed from stone and have roofs of stone slate. The other listed buildings include other houses and associated structures, churches and items in churchyards, former Sunday schools, a well head, milestones, boundary markers, a bridge, two kissing gates, mills, a mausoleum, almshouses, a village hall, and a telephone kiosk.

== Key ==
Grade	Criteria
II*	Particularly important buildings of more than special interest
II	Buildings of national importance and special interest

== Buildings ==
Name and location	Photograph	Date	Notes	Grade
Well head, Meltham Hall; 53.59372°N 1.84097°W	—	Pre-Renaissance (possible)	The well head in the grounds of the hall is in Italian marble. It consists of a tapering cylinder on a round base decorated with shields and rosettes. The rim has a band with nail-head decoration.	II
Lower Edge Farmhouse (east); 53.60153°N 1.84074°W	—	1648	The farmhouse, later incorporated in a larger house, is in stone with a stone slate roof, chamfered gable copings on cut kneelers, and a finial. There are two storeys, and the main entrance has a doorway with chamfered reveals and a Tudor arched lintel. Above this is a decorative shield with initials and the date and a hood mould. Most of the windows are mullioned with hood moulds, many of the mullions have been removed, and there are two round-arched windows.	II
10 and 12 Helme; 53.60432°N 1.84972°W	—	17th century	A pair of mirror-image former weavers' houses, the ground floor being the earliest part, and the upper floors dating from the 19th century. They are in stone with quoins, the roof of No. 12 is in slate, and that of No. 10 in stone slate. There are three storeys, and in the ground floor of each house is a ten-light mullioned and transomed window with a hood mould. Outside the windows are doorways, the right doorway being original with an inscribed Tudor arched lintel, and the left doorway from the 19th century, both with hood moulds. In the upper floors of each house is a six-light mullioned window.	II
96, 98 and 100 Huddersfield Road; 53.59271°N 1.84704°W	—	17th century	The house, which has been extended and divided, is in stone with quoins, and chamfered gable copings on moulded kneelers, one with a finial. There are two storeys, the extension to No. 98 projects and contains a 19th-century doorway and windows. The other windows are mullioned, with some mullions removed. The doorway to No. 100 has a moulded surround and a dated lintel.	II
68, 70 and 72 Huddersfield Road; 53.59239°N 1.84757°W	—	17th or early 18th century	A house that has been altered and divided, it is in stone with quoins, chamfered gable copings on moulded kneelers, and two storeys. The doorway to No. 72 has a moulded surround and an arched lintel, and the other doorways are later. The windows are mullioned, some mullions have been removed, and some lights have been blocked.	II
13–17 Thick Hollins Road; 53.58824°N 1.83967°W	—	17th or early 18th century	A row of three cottages that has been altered, it is in stone with a stone slate roof. No. 13 has an early doorway with moulded jambs and a deep lintel, the doorway of No. 15 dates from the late 18th century, and that of No. 17 from the 19th century. Most of the windows are mullioned, some mullions have been removed, some have hood moulds, and at the rear is a round-arched window.	II
12 and 14 Badger Gate; 53.59375°N 1.85609°W	—	Early 18th century	A house, later extended and divided, it is in stone with quoins and gable copings on cut kneelers. There are two storeys and three bays, and the windows are mullioned.	II
55–61 Huddersfield Road; 53.59240°N 1.84945°W	—	Early 18th century	A row of four stone houses in a terrace, with quoins, a stone slate roof, and two storeys. Each house has a doorway, one with a very deep lintel, and the windows are mullioned with many mullions removed.	II
19 and 21 Thick Hollins Road; 53.58829°N 1.83954°W	—	Early 18th century	A pair of weavers' houses, No. 19 being the earlier, and No. 21 dating from the 19th century. They are in stone with quoins and a stone slate roof. There are three storeys, and the windows are mullioned, with some mullions removed, and some lights blocked.	II
Upper Colders Farmhouse; 53.58645°N 1.85927°W	—	Early 18th century	The farmhouse is in rendered stone with a stone slate roof. At the rear is a wooden porch, and the windows are mullioned with some mullions removed.	II
Craddin Cottage; 53.59963°N 1.84835°W	—	Mid 18th century	A stone house with a stone slate roof that has coped gables and moulded kneelers. There are two storeys, the lower storey being back to earth. In the centre is a Tudor arched doorway, and the windows are mullioned.	II
Milestone, Holmfirth Road; 53.58854°N 1.84509°W		Mid 18th century (probable)	The milestone is at the junction of Holmfirth Road and Mill Bank Road. It consists of a small stone inscribed on three sides with pointing hands, and the directions to Marsden, Penistone and Honley.	II
Farmhouse and barn, Upper Hey; 53.60073°N 1.85739°W	—	Mid 18th century	The house and barn are in stone with quoins, and a stone slate roof with coped gables. The house has two storeys, and a near-central doorway with a deep lintel. The windows are mullioned with some mullions removed, and at the rear are two fire windows. The barn projects to the left, on the front is a central doorway flanked by outshuts, and at the rear is a blocked segmental-arched doorway.	II
14 and 16 Slades Lane; 53.60417°N 1.85048°W	—	1753	A cottage was added to the house in the 19th century. The building is in stone, the house has quoins, and both have a stone slate roof. There are two storeys and the windows are mullioned, with some mullions removed. The doorway to the right has chamfered reveals, and a deep dated and initialled lintel.	II
Guide stoop 53.58577°N 1.83864°W		1761	A milestone at a road junction, it consists of a stone with a rounded top. On three sides are inscribed the distances to Marsden, Penistone, and Holmfirth.	II
54, 56, 58 and 60 Colders Lane and barn 53.59136°N 1.85497°W	—	1764	A farm row of cottages and a barn, the oldest cottages being Nos. 58 and 60. The buildings are in stone with quoins, some roofs are tiled, others are in stone slate. There are two storeys, some doorways have deep lintels, and the windows are mullioned. The barn has been converted for residential use, and contains a large round arched entrance converted into a window.	II
18 and 20 Holmfirth Road; 53.59134°N 1.85045°W		Late 18th century	A pair of houses in a terrace, they are in stone with quoins and a slate roof. There are two storeys, the doorways are to the right, and the windows are mullioned, with some mullions removed.	II
Bole Bent Farmhouse and barn 53.60685°N 1.88072°W	—	Late 18th century (possible)	A pair of mirror-image houses and a barn to the left, with lean-to extensions at both ends. The barn is the older, and the houses were added in the 19th century. The buildings are in stone, with quoins at the rear, and stone slate roofs. The houses have two storeys, central doorways, and mullioned windows with some blocked lights. The barn is lower, and contains a cart entrance with a shallow arched head, and a doorway to the left.	II
Hunter House Farmhouse; 53.59123°N 1.81688°W	—	Late 18th century	A stone farmhouse with quoins, and a stone slate roof with coped gables and moulded kneelers. There are two storeys, a symmetrical front of three bays, and lean-to extensions at the rear. In the centre is a doorway, above it is a single-light window, and the other windows are three-light mullioned windows.	II
Wood Nook House; 53.59221°N 1.81855°W	—	Late 18th century	A house and a former barn, it was later extended to the rear. The building is in stone with quoins, and a stone slate roof with coped gables and moulded kneelers. The house has two storeys and a double-depth plan, a near-central doorway, and mullioned windows. The barn to the right contains two segmental-arched cart entries.	II
St Bartholomew's Church; 53.59222°N 1.85138°W		1785–86	The tower and north transept were added to the church in 1835, and the chancel in 1877–78 when the interior was remodelled. The original part of the church is in Classical style and the chancel is Neo-Norman. The church is built in stone with a stone slate roof, and consists of a nave, a north transept, a chancel and a west tower. The tower has three stages, with blind round-arched windows in the middle stage, and the tall bell stage has Tuscan pilasters, an architrave, a frieze, and a cornice with corner urns. Along the sides of the nave are two tiers of windows, in the south front are two doorways, each with an architrave, a pulvinated frieze and a cornice, and the chancel windows are round-headed with hood moulds.	II
Healey House; 53.60400°N 1.82746°W	—	c. 1800	A large house in Classical style that was extended in about 1850, it is in stone with a stone slate roof. There are two storeys, and a symmetrical front consisting of a central range of three bays under a pediment, flanking wings, and beyond these later single-storey wings. The central round-headed doorway has engaged Doric columns, a dentilled entablature and a fanlight. The window above has a blind balustrade, a surround with chambranles and a cornice, the windows in the outer bays are sashes, and in the wings are Venetian windows. The garden front at the rear has a dentilled cornice, a central doorway with a dentilled cornice, and a Venetian window above. In each outer bay is a two-storey bow window.	II*
Bridge over Hall Dike; 53.60534°N 1.82316°W	—	Late 18th or early 19th century	The bridge carries Wood Bottom Road over Hall Dike, it is in stone, and consists of a single stilted arch. The parapets have copings of stone flags.	II
Lower Edge Farmhouse (west) and barn 53.60151°N 1.84092°W	—	Late 18th or early 19th century	The farmhouse and attached barn are in stone with quoins and a stone slate roof. The house has two storeys and mullioned windows. The barn contains a central elliptical-arched cart entry with a small window above, round pitching holes, and a doorway.	II
53 Huddersfield Road; 53.59234°N 1.84968°W	—	Early 19th century	A weaver's house in stone, with a sill band, a stone slate roof, three storeys and a symmetrical front of three bays. Above the central doorway is a single-light window in each upper floor, and the outer bays contain four-light windows in each floor.	II
110–120 Huddersfield Road; 53.59279°N 1.84624°W	—	Early 19th century	A terrace of six stone houses that have a stone slate roof with gable copings on cut kneelers. There are two storeys, each house has one bay, two houses have porches, and the windows are mullioned. In the front, each house has a five-light window in the ground floor and two three-light windows in the upper floor, and at the rear is a three-light window in the upper floor.	II
Gill Birks; 53.58582°N 1.82682°W	—	Early 19th century	A farmhouse in stone with quoins, a stone slate roof and two storeys. The doorway is near the centre, and the windows are mullioned with one blocked light.	II
Heady Fields houses and barns 53.58558°N 1.83398°W	—	Early 19th century	A pair of weavers' cottages flanked by barns and with short wings at the ends. They are in stone with a stone slate roof, hipped at the ends. The houses have two storeys, two bays each, and the windows are mullioned, including eleven-light windows in the upper floor of each house. Each barn has four bays, a central arched cart entry, and ventilation holes.	II
The Vicarage, Wilshaw; 53.58459°N 1.82504°W	—	1831	A house, subsequently a vicarage, it has been extended to the left and at the rear. It is in stone with a sill band and a hipped stone slate roof. There are two storeys and a symmetrical front of three bays. In the centre is a doorway with a plain surround and a fanlight, the windows are sashes, and in the right return is a canted bay window.	II
23 and 25 Greens End Road; 53.59143°N 1.85233°W	—	Early to mid 19th century	A pair of weavers' houses in stone with a stone slate roof, three storeys, and mullioned windows. In the ground floor are central doorways and four-light windows, in each of the upper floors are five-light windows, and in the gable ends are two-light windows.	II
1 Mean Lane; 53.59440°N 1.85087°W	—	Early to mid 19th century	A former weaver's house at the end of a row, it is in stone with moulded gutter brackets, a stone slate roof, and mullioned windows. There are four storeys and one bay, with the lower two storeys at the rear back to earth. In the ground floor are two doorways between which is a three-light window, and in each of the upper floors is a four-light window. At the rear is a taking-in door.	II
25 and 27 Mill Moor Road; 53.59238°N 1.85457°W	—	Early to mid 19th century	A pair of mirror-image weavers' houses in stone with a stone slate roof and three storeys. The doorways are in the outer parts, the windows are mullioned with some mullions removed and some lights blocked, and at the rear is a taking-in door.	II
33 Mill Moor Road; 53.59239°N 1.85489°W	—	Early to mid 19th century	A former weaver's house, it is in stone with a stone slate roof, and three storeys. The ground floor has been altered, and the windows are mullioned, with some blocked lights.	II
35–41 Mill Moor Road; 53.59238°N 1.85506°W	—	Early to mid 19th century	A row of four houses at the end of a terrace, they are in stone with a stone slate roof and two storeys. In the ground floor each house has a doorway and altered windows, and in the upper floor are three-light mullioned windows.	II
5 Sefton Lane; 53.59302°N 1.85418°W	—	Early to mid 19th century	A weaver's house in the middle of a short terrace, it is in stone with a stone slate roof and two storeys. There are two doorways, one inserted later, and the window are mullioned with some blocked lights.	II
8, 10 and 18 Slaithwaite Road; 53.59417°N 1.85249°W	—	Early to mid 19th century	A pair of weavers' houses and a cottage to the left, they are in stone and have a stone slate roof with coped gables. The house has three storeys and the cottage has two. The doorways in the houses are to the left and in the cottage to the right, and the windows are mullioned with some mullions removed.	II
17 The Hollow; 53.59346°N 1.85805°W	—	Early to mid 19th century	A small house at the end of a row, it is in stone with quoins, a stone slate roof with moulded kneelers, and mullioned windows. The doorway is to the left, to the right is a six-light window, and in the upper floor are two three-light windows.	II
Kissing gate and gate piers at entrance to footpath 53.58771°N 1.85032°W	—	Early to mid 19th century (probable)	The kissing gate consists of upright stone slabs, and the wooden gate is attached to the gate pier by iron hinges. It is paved in stone.	II
Kissing gate and gate piers at midpoint of footpath 53.58841°N 1.85077°W	—	Early to mid 19th century (probable)	The kissing gate consists of upright stone slabs, and the wooden gate is attached to the gate pier by iron hinges. It is paved in stone.	II
Milestone between Healey House and Bent Ley Mills; 53.60126°N 1.83382°W		Early to mid 19th century	The milestone is on the southeast side of Huddersfield Road (B6018 road). It consists of a round-headed stone, and is inscribed with the distances to Meltham and Huddersfield.	II
Upper Sunny Bank Mills (east blocks); 53.59412°N 1.86335°W	—	Early to mid 19th century	The two blocks of a mill complex are in stone, and have a stone slate roof with a coped gable to the left. The left block has four storeys and nine bays, and the right block, which projects forward, has five storeys, five bays on the front, and is four bays deep. The windows are casements, at the rear of the left block is a low square tapering chimney, and at the rear of the right block is a hoist tower.	II
Bent Ley Mill; 53.59776°N 1.83553°W	—	1840	A silk mill, consisting of a warehouse, an office block, a shed, engine house, boiler house, and a chimney. It is built in gritstone with brick vaults, cast iron beams, and hipped slate roofs, partly glazed. The office two storeys, seven bays on the front and two on the sides, the middle three bays projecting under a pediment containing a clock face. The chimney is free-standing, octagonal and tapering.	II
Holt Head Sunday School; 53.60482°N 1.87927°W		1840	The Sunday school, later converted for residential use, is in stone with quoins, and a stone slate roof with coped gables. The symmetrical pedimented front has three bays, and contains a central doorway with pilasters, a cambered head, and an inscribed fanlight. Above it is a cornice and an inscribed tablet, and above the doorway and in the flanking bays are round-headed sash windows. Along the sides are two storeys and two bays with square-headed windows, and at the rear is a single-storey extension.	II
Meltham Hall; 53.59318°N 1.84105°W		1841	A large house that was extended later in the century, and has since been converted into flats, it is in stone on a plinth, with a slate roof, and is in Classical style. There are two storeys, three bays at the front and rear, and four on the sides. Between the bays are giant pilasters, the capitals decorated with anthemion, and at the top is a cornice and a balustraded parapet. In front of the middle bay is an elaborate porte-cochère in iron and glass, and above it is a Venetian window. At the rear is a central bow window, and the other windows are sashes with architraves.	II
St James' Church, Meltham Mills; 53.59450°N 1.83867°W		1844–45	The church, which is in Gothic Revival style, is built in stone with slate roofs. It has a cruciform plan, consisting of a nave, north and south transepts, a south porch on the south transept, a chancel with a vestry and an organ chamber, and a west steeple. The steeple has a two-stage tower with a south porch, diagonal buttresses, an embattled parapet with corner crocketed pinnacles, and surmounted by a recessed spire. At the corners of the body of the church are angle buttresses with tall pinnacles.	II
Coach house, Healey House; 53.60434°N 1.82768°W	—	c. 1850	The coach house is in stone with clasping buttresses, and a hipped slate roof with a glazed lantern surmounted by a weather cock. It contains a central elliptical-arched carriage entrance with a blank tablet above.	II
41–47 Mathew Lane; 53.59189°N 1.85826°W	—	Mid 19th century	A terrace of four weavers' houses, in stone with a stone slate roof and two storeys. Each house has a doorway and a four-light window in the ground floor, two three-light windows in the upper floor, and at the rear are a two-light and a three-light window at the rear.	II
Christ Church, Helme; 53.60335°N 1.84893°W		1859	The church is in Decorated style, and built in stone with a tile roof. It consists of a nave, north and south aisle, a timber south porch, a chancel, and a southwest steeple. The steeple has two stages, angle buttresses, clock faces with hood moulds, an eaves cornice, and is surmounted by a shingled spire with a splayed foot.	II
Mausoleum of Mary Beaumont; 53.58453°N 1.82634°W		1859	The mausoleum is in the churchyard of St Mary's Church, Wilshaw, to the east of the church. It is in stone, on a square moulded plinth, and has an octagonal plan. On each side is a round arch with clustered red granite colonnettes. Four of the arches contain marble and red granite plaques, three with inscriptions, two arches contain carved limestone figures, and two have angels. At the top are four pediments with coats of arms in the tympani, and the whole is surmounted by a large draped urn.	II
Bank Buildings; 53.58917°N 1.84358°W		c. 1860	A terrace of 34 houses, including underdwellings, they are in stone, with Tudor features, and a slate roof with coped gables. There are three storeys with attics at the front, two storeys with attics at the rear, and 21 bays. In the centre, at the ends, and between are gables, interspersed with dormers. The entrances are arched, the windows vary, in the centre is an oriel window and an inscribed plaque, and flanking the centre are four-storey bay windows.	II
St Mary's Church, Wilshaw; 53.58452°N 1.82676°W		1862–63	The church incorporates a variety of architectural styles, and is built in stone with slate roofs. The church is at the east end, at the west end is a former Sunday school, and between is a large vestibule surmounted by a tower, and a north porch. The church has a nave and a short chancel, and at the west end is a projection matching the chancel. The tower has a steep pyramidal roof with louvred lucarnes and decorative iron cresting, and to the south is an octagonal stair tower. The doorway has colonnettes with foliated capitals and a moulded and decorated arch, and in the gable apex is an oculus. The windows are also round-headed with colonnettes.	II
Boiler house and chimney, St Mary's Church, Wilshaw; 53.58437°N 1.82688°W	—	c. 1863	The boiler house and chimney are in stone. The boiler house has moulded gutter brackets, and a slate roof with coped gables and carved kneelers. On the north side are three round-arched doorways. The tall chimney is square, with two stages, both panelled, and at the top is a moulded cap with a round-arched corbel table.	II
Gate piers, gates walls and railings, St Mary's Church, Wilshaw; 53.58471°N 1.82680°W	—	c. 1863	At the entrance to the churchyard are decorated gate piers with triangular pedimented caps. Between them are cast iron gates, outside them are dwarf walls with cast iron railings, and at the ends are smaller piers.	II
Boundary stone, Bent Ley Mills; 53.59787°N 1.83593°W		Mid to late 19th century	The boundary stone is on the east side of Huddersfield Road (B6108 road), and marks the boundary between the townships of South Crosland and Meltham. It has a triangular plan, and is inscribed with the names of the townships.	II
1 and 2 The Almshouses; 53.58420°N 1.82756°W	—	1871	A mirror-image pair of almshouses in stone that have a slate roof with coped gables and bargeboards. There are two storeys, and flanking lean-to extensions. In the centre is a porch with a hipped roof and bargeboards, and two round-arched entrances. Each house has a two-light sash window with a hood mould in the ground floor, and a single-light sash window above rising as a dormer.	II
3 and 4 The Almshouses; 53.58406°N 1.82751°W	—	1871	A mirror-image pair of almshouses in stone that have a slate roof with coped gables and bargeboards. There are two storeys, and flanking lean-to extensions. In the centre is a porch with a hipped roof and bargeboards, and two round-arched entrances. Each house has a two-light sash window with a hood mould in the ground floor, and a single-light sash window above rising as a dormer. In the centre is a round-arched inscribed and dated plaque.	II
5 and 6 The Almshouses; 53.58392°N 1.82746°W	—	1871	A mirror-image pair of almshouses in stone that have a slate roof with coped gables and bargeboards. There are two storeys, and flanking lean-to extensions. In the centre is a porch with a hipped roof and bargeboards, and two round-arched entrances. Each house has a two-light sash window with a hood mould in the ground floor, and a single-light sash window above rising as a dormer.	II
Village Hall, Wilshaw; 53.58372°N 1.82328°W	—	1873	Originally a school and schoolmaster's house, later a village hall and private house, it is in stone with shaped gables, pyramidal finials and a ball finial. The school has a single storey and five bays, with a Tudor arched doorway and an inscription. The house is at right angles, with two storeys and a symmetrical front of three bays. The windows are mullioned, in the ground floor with hood moulds, and in the upper floor rising as gabled dormers.	II
Boundary stone, Flake Moss; 53.57156°N 1.88669°W		Late 19th century	The boundary stone is on the east side of Wessenden Head Road, and marks the boundary between the townships of Meltham and Marsden. It consists of a stone with a rounded top, inscribed with a vertical line and the names of the townships.	II
Telephone Kiosk; 53.58453°N 1.82447°W		1935	The telephone kiosk is at the junction of Lower Greave Road and Wilshaw Road, and is a K6 type, designed by Giles Gilbert Scott. Constructed in cast iron with a square plan and a dome, it has three unperforated crowns in the top panels.	II
