= John Dyson =

John Dyson may refer to:

== Sport ==
- John Dyson (cricketer, born 1954), Australian international cricketer
- John Dyson (rugby) (1866–1909), English rugby union player
- John Dyson (cricketer, born 1913) (1913–1991), English cricketer
- John Barry Dyson (1942–1995), English association footballer for several Football League clubs including Tranmere Rovers and Watford
- Jack Dyson (1934–2000), English first-class cricketer

== Other ==
- John Dyson, Lord Dyson (born 1943), judge in the English High Court and later the Supreme Court
- John S. Dyson, political and business leader in New York
- John Dyson, musician best known as a member of the former 1980s New Age instrumental duo Wavestar
