= Honley High School =

Location
- Station Road; Holmfirth, West Yorkshire, HD9 6QJ; England; 53°36′28″N 1°47′04″W

Information
- Type: Academy
- Established: 1932
- Local authority: Kirklees
- Trust: Together Learning Trust
- Department for Education URN: 146906 Tables
- Ofsted: Reports
- Headteacher: E. Lord
- Deputy Headteacher: S. Hansom
- Gender: Coeducational
- Age: 11 to 16
- Enrolment: 1,284
- Website: http://www.honleyhigh.co.uk

Honley High School is a coeducational secondary school situated on the edge of the village of Honley in the Holme Valley, West Yorkshire, England. The catchment area includes the neighbouring villages of Brockholes, Honley, Meltham and Netherton (those living in Holmfirth can also attend) Honley High has around 1,250 pupils aged 11–16. The school houses the specialist autism provision for young people with ASD from the South Kirklees area. Honley High school ranked 825th out of 3166 schools across the country in 2019.

== History ==
=== Grammar school ===
The school was established in September 1932. Sir James Hinchliffe LL.D, chairman of the West Riding County Council, officially opened the school at a ceremony held on Saturday, 29 April 1933, at which the Bishop of Wakefield, Dr J Buchanan Seaton, offered a prayer of dedication.

The building was designed by architect H. Wormald, A.R.I.B.A. It was extended in the 1950s with the addition of new classrooms, including a geography room, biology lab, music room, dining room and kitchen, in the original style.

At the time of the opening the school had a teaching staff of 14 and could accommodate 480 pupils.

=== Comprehensive school ===
In 1973, Holme Valley Grammar School became Honley High School and a new complex of modern buildings accompanied the changeover to a comprehensive education. These included a sports hall, gymnasium, music rooms, drama studio, and art and craft rooms and workshops.

In the jubilee year of 1982, the school had a teaching staff of 82 and a pupil population of approximately 1,300.

In February 2000, Honley High featured in a list of only 29 schools that Ofsted announced had "excellent" improvement since the first round of inspections. The 2005 Ofsted report described the school as 'good', complimenting its headteacher, pupils, teaching and value for money, with reservations over the I.T. department, marking procedures and information to parents. Subsequent reports in 2008 and 2011 judged the school as Grade 2 "Good" for overall effectiveness. The 2013 report gave the school an overall Grade 3 "Requires improvement" judgement, with concerns over pupils' progress, inconsistent teaching and lesson planning, and inadequate pupil monitoring. Strengths noted were the good progress of pupils with special needs, good GCSE results, positive pupil involvement, and the focus of governors and leaders.

The school was further extended in 2001-02, providing new facilities for the mathematics and English departments. This new wing was named after alumnus Roy Castle, following a poll of pupils.

In January 2014, Paul Greenough became the Headteacher.

=== Academy ===
Previously a foundation school administered by Kirklees Metropolitan District Council, in September 2019 Honley High School converted to academy status. The school is now sponsored by the Together Learning Trust.

== Notable former pupils ==
=== Holme Valley Grammar School ===
- David Bintley (1969–76) — choreographer and Director since 1995 of Birmingham Royal Ballet
- David Capewell (1970–77) — Maj Gen and Assistant Chief of Defence Staff, former Deputy Commander of NATO Rapid Deployable Italian Corps
- Roy Castle (1943–47) — entertainer
- Geoffrey Riley (1941–46) — won the George Cross in May 1944 when aged 14 at the school

=== Honley High School ===
- Darren Baker (1990-1995) — Artist, painted Queen Elizabeth II for her official portrait
- Eorl Crabtree — Rugby League footballer (2000–present)
- Jonathan Holmes (1973–1980) — Professor of Physical Geography, University College London
- Jehst (1992–95) — rapper
- Jonathan Stead (1994–99) — footballer
