= Meltham =

Town and civil parish in West Yorkshire, England

Coordinates: 53.592°N 1.850°W

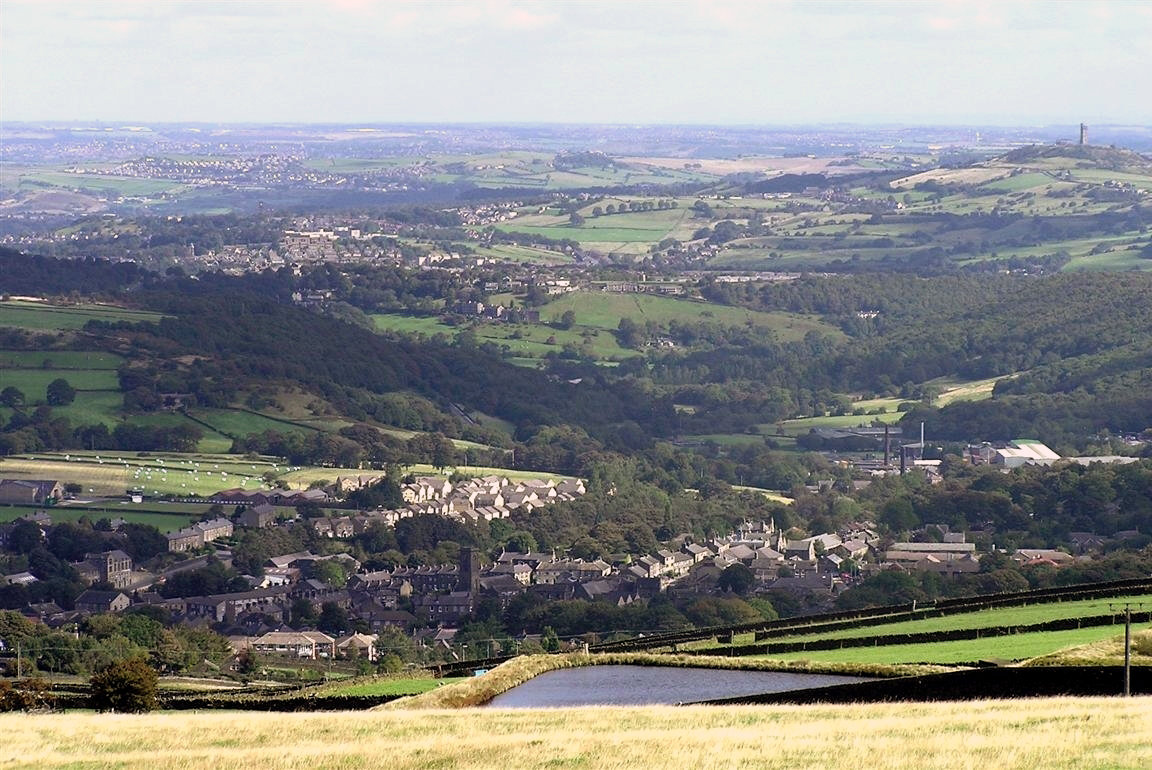
- Meltham and lower Holme Valley

- Location within West Yorkshire
- Population: 8,590 (2021 census)
- OS grid reference: SE099106
- Civil parish: Meltham
- Metropolitan borough: Kirklees
- Metropolitan county: West Yorkshire
- Region: Yorkshire and the Humber
- Country: England
- Sovereign state: United Kingdom
- Post town: HOLMFIRTH
- Postcode district: HD9
- Dialling code: 01484
- Police: West Yorkshire
- Fire: West Yorkshire
- Ambulance: Yorkshire
- UK Parliament: Colne Valley

Meltham is a town and civil parish within the Metropolitan Borough of Kirklees, in West Yorkshire, England. It lies in the Holme Valley, below Wessenden Moor, 5 miles (8 kilometres) south-west of Huddersfield on the edge of the Peak District National Park. It had a population of 8,089 at the 2001 census, which was estimated to have increased to 8,600 by 2005. The population assessed at the 2011 Census was 8,534. According to the 2021 Census, the civil parish of Meltham had a population of 8,590 people living in 3,695 households.

It has 12 elected council members who meet up around every 6 weeks.

== History ==
The name Meltham probably derives from the Old English melthām meaning 'smelting or smelter's village'.

The valley has been inhabited since pre-historic times and there are two Iron Age sites overlooking the town. In 1086, Meltham was recorded in the Domesday Book as a village in the hundred of Agbrigg and the county of Yorkshire although in 1086 the village had been laid waste.

== Geography ==
Meltham also includes the small village of Helme which has its own school and church. Meltham is situated within close reach of several major cities. Bradford is 14 miles (23 km) to the north, Leeds is 19 miles (31 km) north-east, Manchester is 19 miles (31 km) to the south-west and Sheffield is 21 miles (34 km) to the south-east.

Surrounding towns and villages within the Kirklees area include Crosland Moor, Golcar, Honley, Holmfirth, Linthwaite, Marsden, Netherton and Slaithwaite, with the villages of Saddleworth not far away across the county border in Oldham.

The Pennine Way runs across Wessenden Head around 3 miles (5 km) to the south-west and the Peak District Boundary Walk also runs past the west side of the town.

== Transport ==
The town used to have a station on the Meltham branch line, which ran from Lockwood outside of Huddersfield. The line opened to passengers in 1869, closing in 1949, then it survived as a freight only line until the 1960s.

Currently, Meltham is served by a network of frequent bus services, including the 324 to Huddersfield operated by First West Yorkshire, the 335 between Slaithwaite and Holmfirth and 911 Meltham to Thurstonland via Honley operated by Stotts Coaches, and local route 933 operated by South Pennine Community Transport.

== Education ==
Meltham itself contains three primary schools, namely Meltham Church of England (C of E) School, Meltham Moor Primary School and Helme (C of E) junior and infant school. Secondary schools serving Meltham primarily include Honley High School, Holmfirth High School and Colne Valley High School, all of which are located in neighbouring areas.

== Sport ==
Meltham has active teams in a variety of sports, including football, cricket and rugby league. The football team, Meltham Athletic FC, used to play in the West Riding County Amateur Football League Premier Division. Notable honours include the West Riding Challenge Cup in 2005, the Huddersfield and District League on two occasions and the Barlow Cup 4 times (including three in a row 2003–05). The cricket side, Meltham CC, has won the 1st XI Byrom Shield on 7 occasions and the Sykes Cup 8 times. The 1st XI and 2nd XI currently play in the Drakes Premierships 1 and 2 respectively. Notable ex-players include England international cricketer Ryan Sidebottom, Dilip Doshi (father of Nayan), Madan Lal and Shahid Mahmood. The rugby league side, Meltham All Blacks ARLFC, currently play in the Pennine League Division 4.

== Media ==
Local news and television programmes are provided by BBC Yorkshire and ITV Yorkshire. Television signals are received from the Emley Moor TV transmitter.

The town receives its radio signals from the nearby Holme Moss transmitter which broadcast BBC Radio Leeds, BBC Radio 1, 2, 3 and 4. Other radio stations that cover the town are Heart Yorkshire, Capital Yorkshire, Hits Radio West Yorkshire, and Greatest Hits Radio West Yorkshire.

Meltham is served by the local newspaper, Huddersfield Daily Examiner.

== Arts ==
=== Music ===
Meltham is home to the Meltham and Meltham Mills Band, which was established in 1846 as a brass band. They became the first band to win the British Open Title for three consecutive years, a feat only matched by 5 others.

The celebrated electric guitar amplifier company Matamp is based in Meltham.

=== Television ===
Meltham has been used as part of the location for several television projects. The third episode in 1995's Coogan's Run was set in and around Meltham Parish Church Hall. In addition scenes of long-running BBC sitcom Last of the Summer Wine and ITV drama Where the Heart Is used some Meltham houses as character's homes. The scout hut has also been used as well as streets for shooting outdoor scenes.

== Industrial history ==
=== Brook(e) family ===
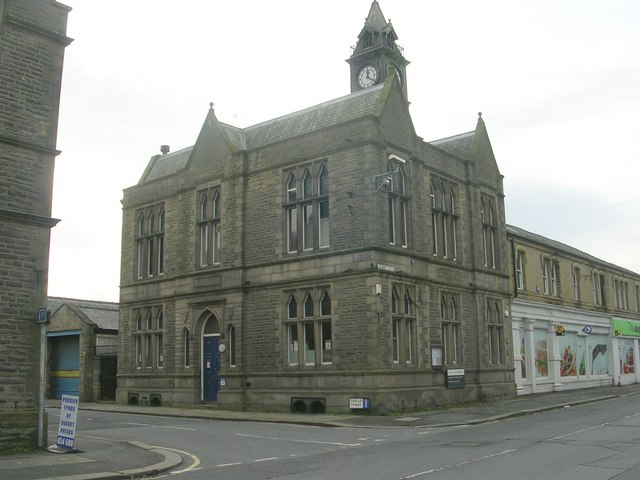
Meltham Town Hall

Meltham Mills was the former site of Jonas Brook and Brothers, a silk mill complex that employed over 1,000 workers during the late 19th century. The Brook family originally came from New House Hall in Sheepridge, moving to Thickhollins towards the end of the 18th century. William Brook married Martha Smith at Bradford Parish Church – the daughter of a prominent Mirfield banker. Their sons Jonas, James and Joseph established their business in Meltham Mills, using a goat's head – the crest from the Brook's coat of arms – as their brand. The goat's head can still be seen on the old office building to the mill complex and their arms are emblazoned in St. James' Church, in Meltham Mills (which the family built) – a hawkes lure: motto "en dieu ma foy" (in God my trust). Meltham Mills Band also carry the Brook family coat of arms as their official logo. Edward Brook died in 1904 at Hoddom Castle, the house near Ecclefechan, south-west Scotland, which he had purchased in 1878. The Brook family were philanthropists and built housing in Meltham Mills for their employees, including the convalescent home. They also built Meltham Hall, Meltham Town Hall and Helme Church and owned an estate at Enderby in Leicestershire. William Brook is buried with his wife Martha in Meltham Church, but his descendants are buried in the crypt underneath St. James Church, Meltham Mills.

Jonas Brook and Brothers became United Threads in 1890 and Sir Hildred Carlile of Ponsonby Hall, Hertfordshire was a Director of the business. United Threads was closed in 1939 – the business was transferred to Paisley as part of J & P Coats – now Coats Group. The factory site was taken over by David Brown Tractors.

John Charles Brooke, who originated from the Silkstone branch of the Newhouse Hall family was Somerset Herald during the 18th century. He was crushed to death at the Haymarket Theatre in London following the crowd's clamour to see King George III in 1794. He is buried in St Benet Paul's Wharf in London.

=== Tractor factory ===
Meltham Mills was also the former base of the David Brown Tractors factory opening in 1939 and closing operations on the site in 1988. The various building have now been converted into a diverse number of industrial units, one housing a Tractor museum and other large sections containing an indoor Kart racing track (now closed down).

Durker Roods, the former home of Sir David Brown was converted into a hotel and the grounds were sold for private housing. The hotel closed in 2021, and is currently falling into disrepair.

The town has its own joint Scouting and Guides Association buildings.

== Notable people from Meltham ==
Meltham was the birthplace of Lance Sergeant James Taylor (25B/82) E Company 2nd Battalion, 24th Regiment (2nd Warwickshire), who fought at, and survived, the battle at Rorke's Drift in the Zulu war. Although born in the village, to parents William Dyson Taylor and Sarah Taylor of Helms Lane, both of whom were also born there, he grew up in Manchester and died in Wales, but can still be regarded as a native of Meltham.

Albert Craig, dubbed the Surrey Poet, was also born and raised in Meltham. His ditties mostly related to cricket and football.

Australian textile magnate Godfrey Hirst was born at Royd Edge, Meltham in 1857. In 1890 he founded the Godfrey Hirst Woollen Mills at Geelong, Victoria, which in the early 20th century became the largest manufacturer of textiles in Australia. The company still operates, as Godfrey Hirst Carpets. Hirst died in 1917.

Dora Thewlis, who gained brief national notoriety as a young suffragette when a photograph of her arrest appeared on the front page of the Daily Mirror, was born on Shady Row, Meltham Mills, in May 1890. Within a few years of her birth, the residents of the row had successfully petitioned to have the boundary redrawn so that the entirety of Meltham Mills was within the township of Meltham.

== See also ==
- Listed buildings in Meltham

== Gallery ==
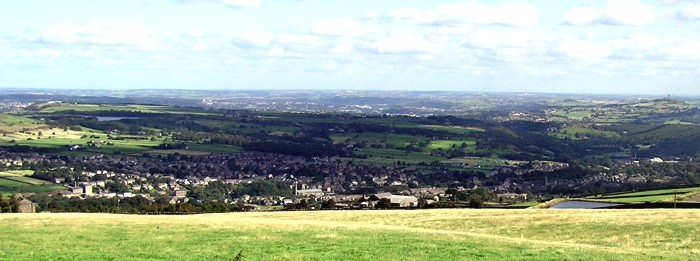
View of Meltham from Wessenden Moor, Huddersfield is in the far distance

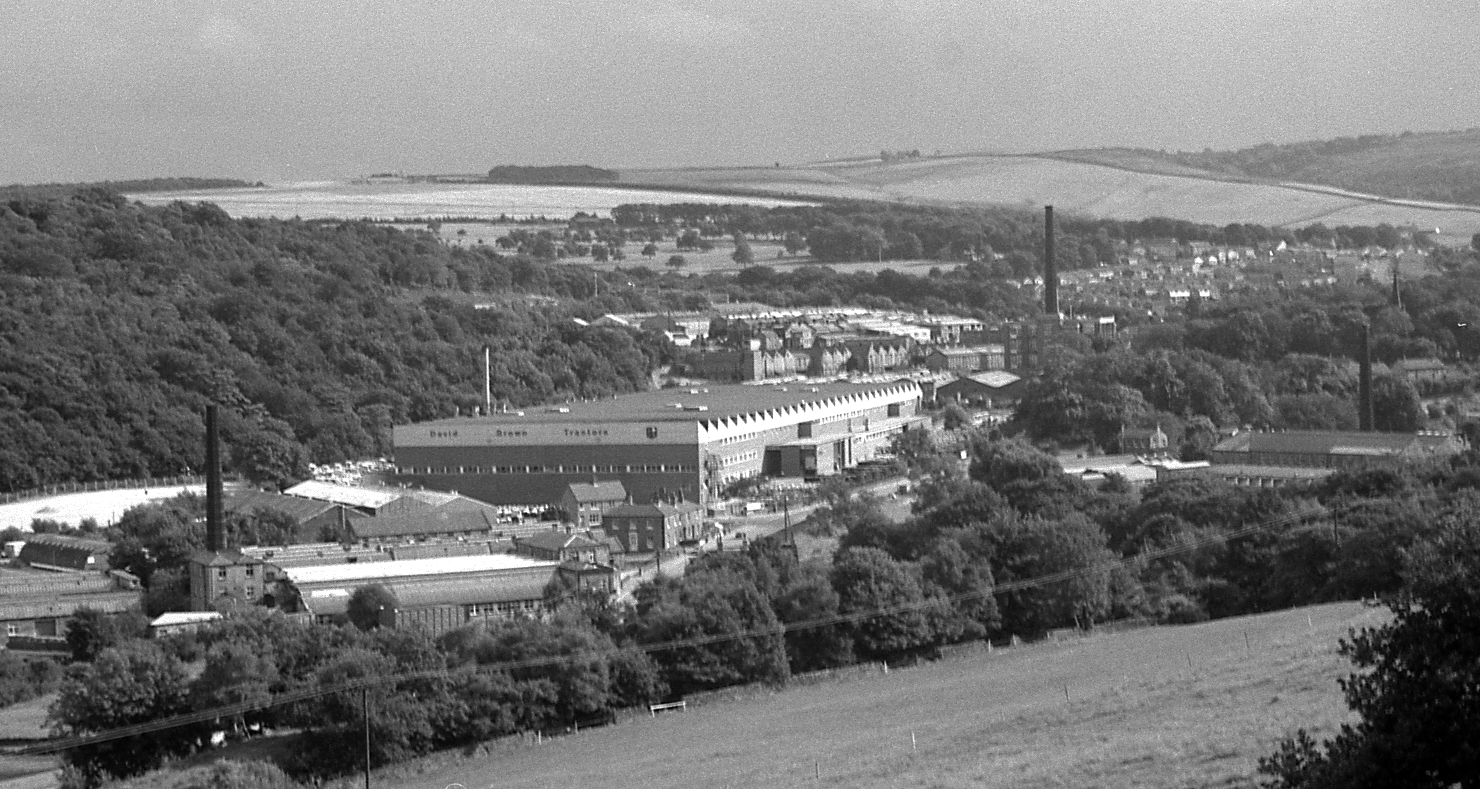
David Brown Tractor Factory Meltham, 1981

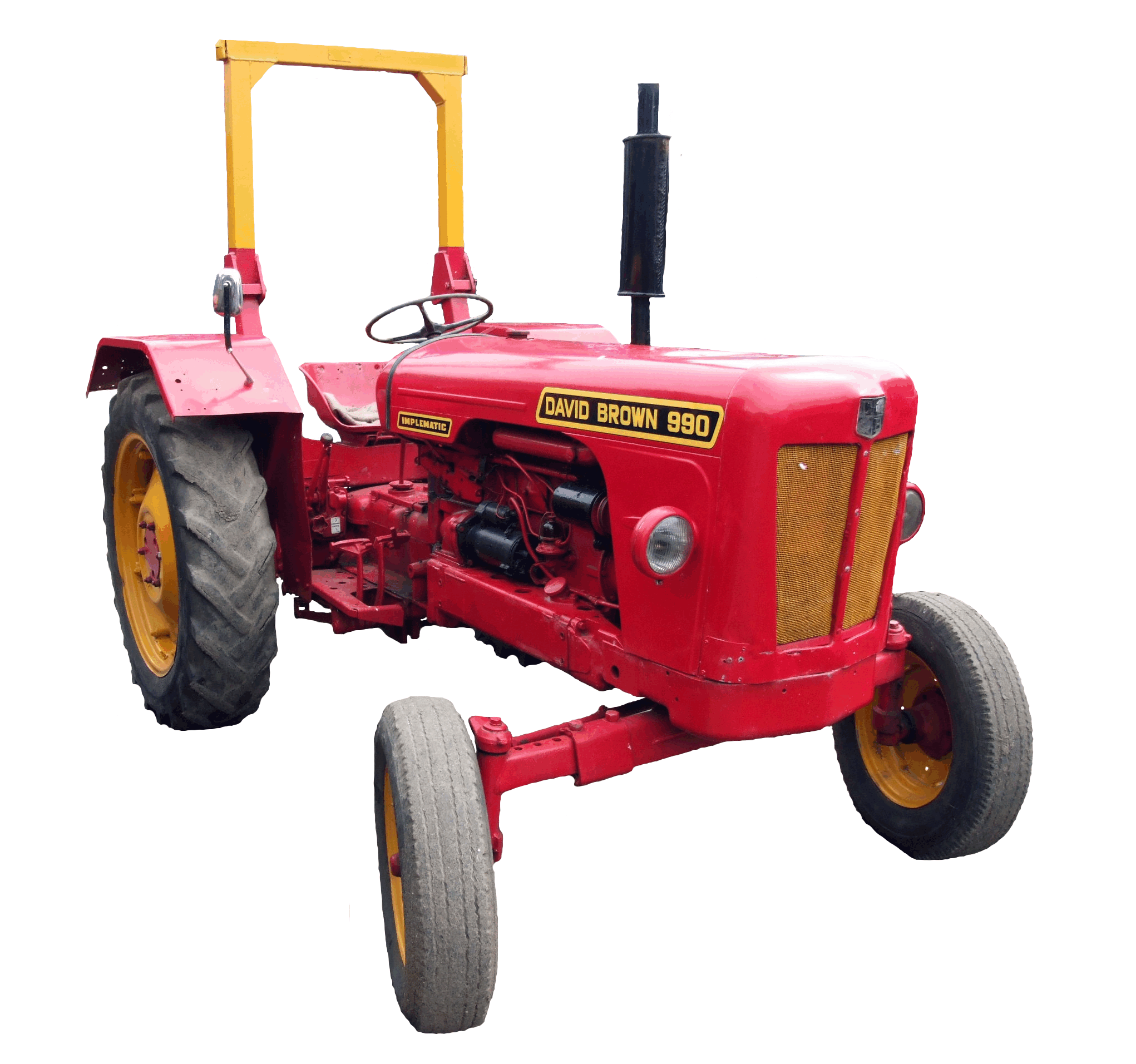
David Brown 990 Implematic Tractor Made in Meltham around 1964

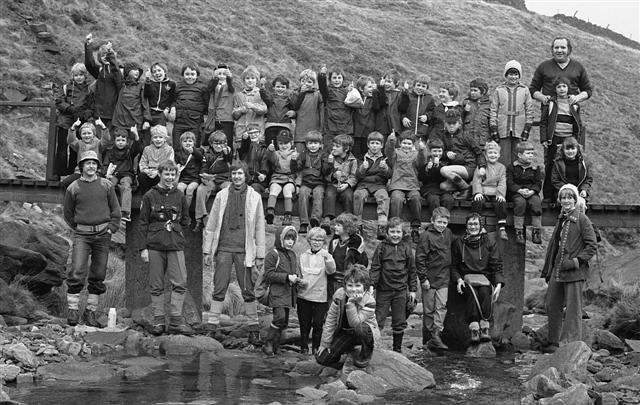
Meltham Cub Scouts, on Blackpool Bridge, near Digley reservoir (late 1970s)

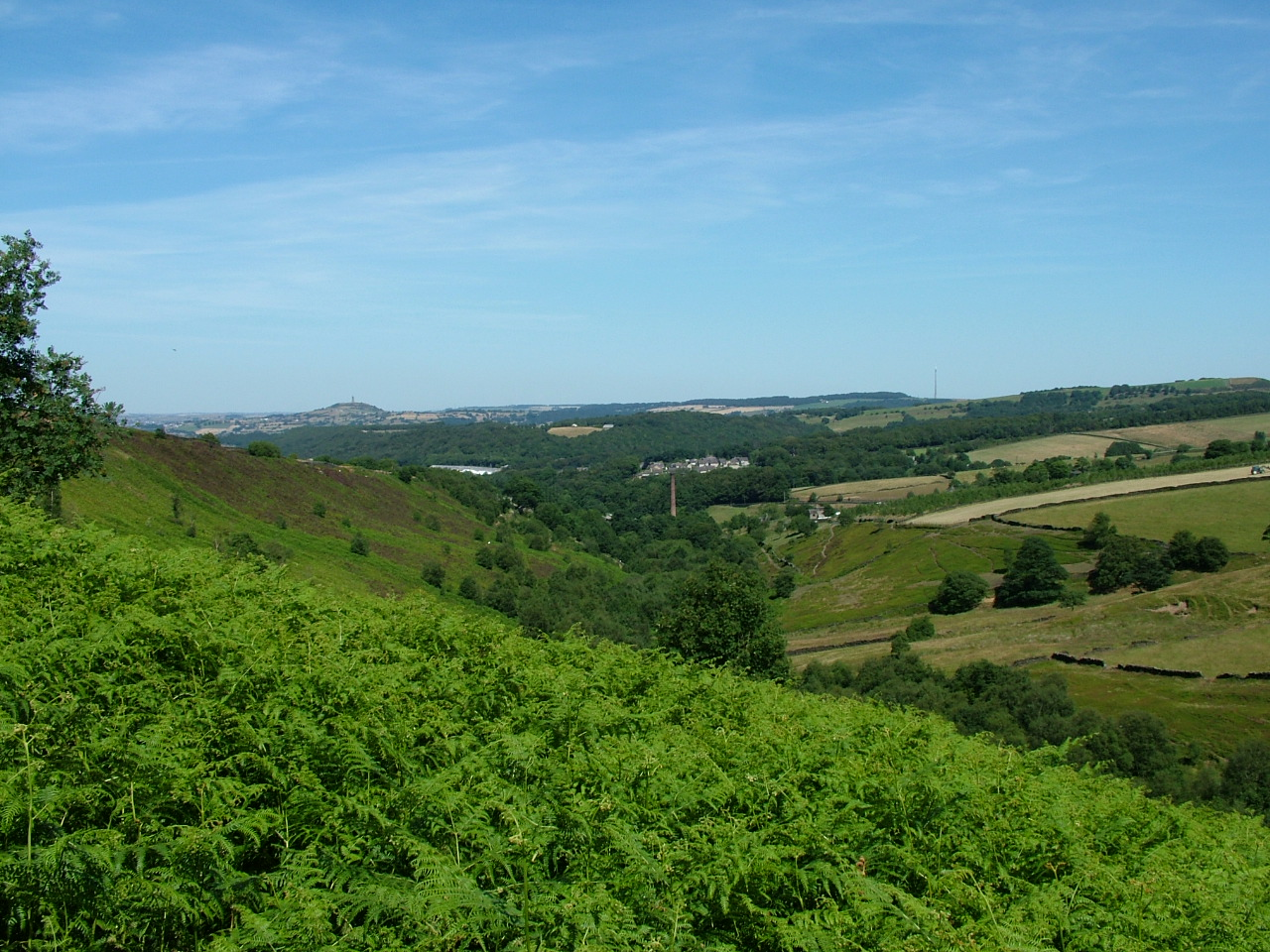
Meltham viewed from Royd Edge

== Location grid ==
The above grid is based on exact directions rather than close to.
