= Helme, West Yorkshire =

Village in West Yorkshire, England

Coordinates: 53.6041°N 1.8503°W

Helme
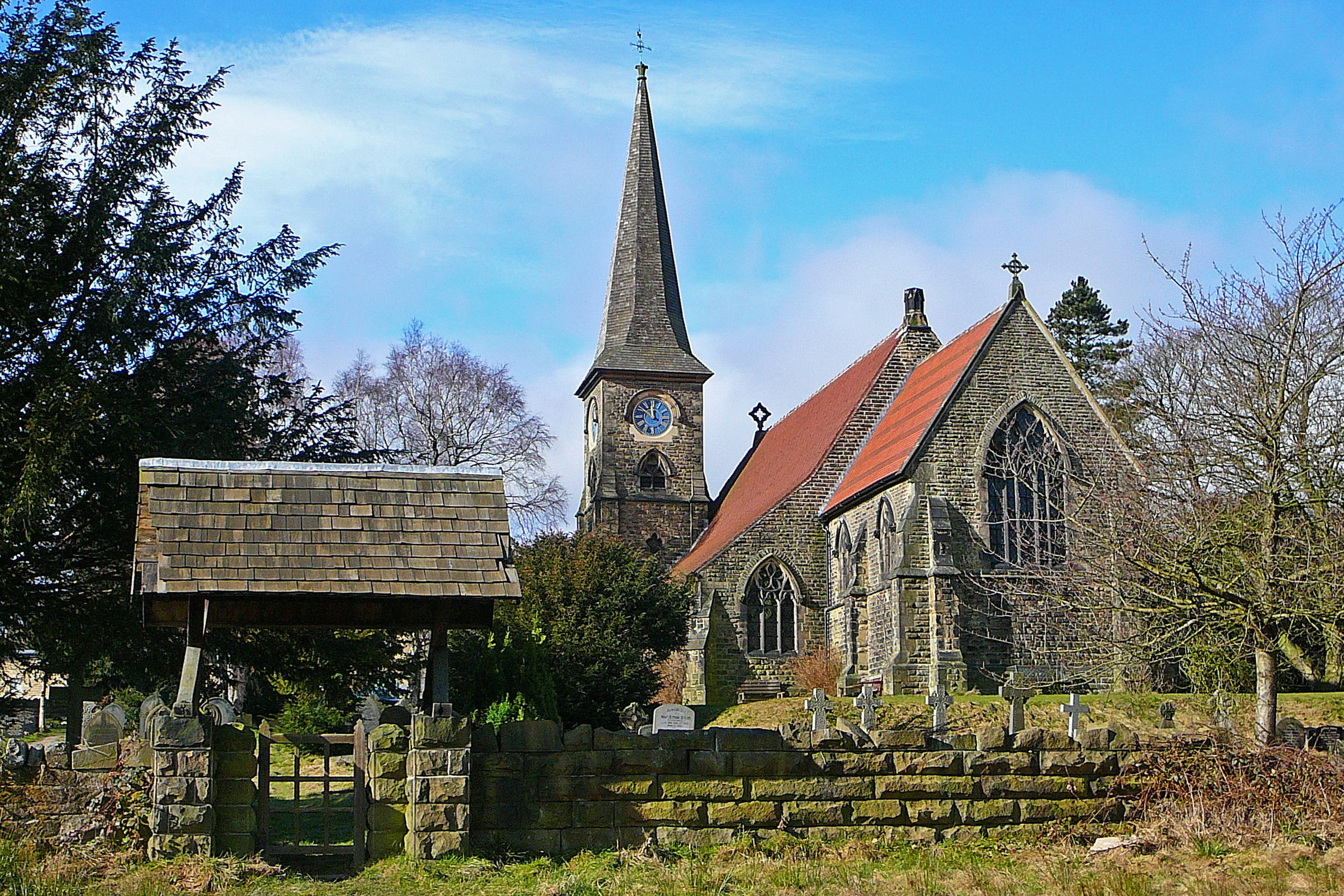
- Christ Church

- Location within West Yorkshire
- Civil parish: Meltham
- Metropolitan borough: Kirklees
- Metropolitan county: West Yorkshire
- Region: Yorkshire and the Humber
- Country: England
- Sovereign state: United Kingdom

Helme is a village in the civil parish of Meltham, in the Kirklees district, in the county of West Yorkshire, England. It is near the town of Meltham and Blackmoorfoot Reservoir. Helme, constituted in 1858, was part of Almondbury parish in the 19th century.

== Amenities ==
The local primary school is Helme Church of England Academy. Christ Church on Slades Lane, designed by James Pigott Pritchett and consecrated in November 1859, is a Grade II listed building.

Nearby Helme Hall, built in the late 19th century, is now a nursing and residential home for the elderly.

== See also ==
- Listed buildings in Meltham
