= Semicircular arch =

Arch shape common in ancient Roman architecture

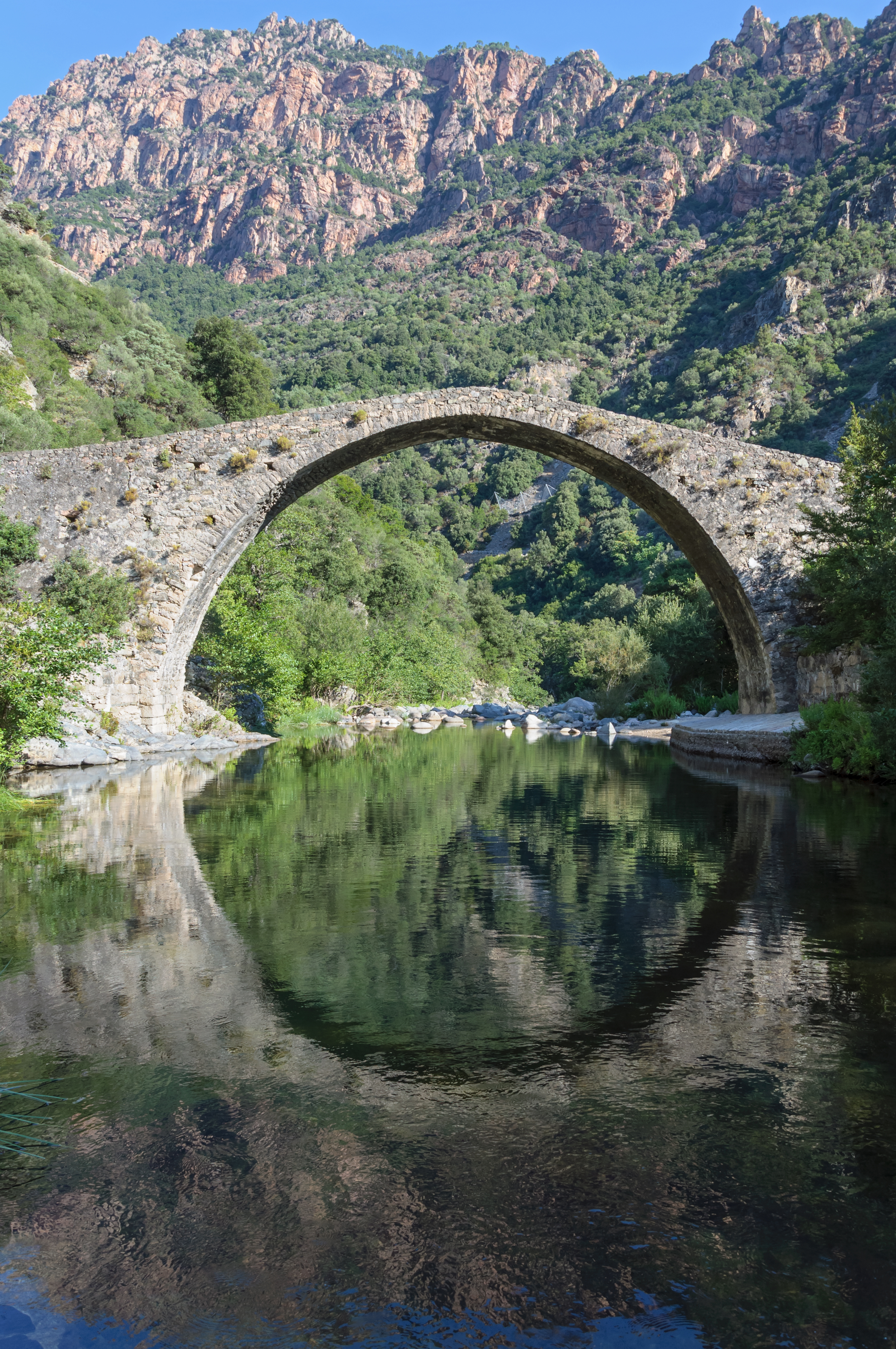
Semicircular arch (Pianella bridge, Corse-du-Sud, 15th century)

In architecture, a semicircular arch is an arch with an intrados (inner surface) shaped like a semicircle. This type of arch was adopted and very widely used by the Romans, thus becoming permanently associated with Roman architecture.

== Terminology ==
When the arch construction involves the Roman techniques (either wedge-like stone voussoirs or thin Roman bricks), it is known as a Roman arch. The semicircular arch is also known as a round arch.

== Description ==
The rise (height) of a round arch is limited to 1/2 of its span, so it looks more "grounded" than a parabolic arch or a pointed arch. Whenever a higher semicircular arch was required (for example, for a narrow arch to match the height of a nearby broad one), either stilting or horseshoe shape were used, thus creating a stilted arch and horseshoe arch respectively. These "shifts and dodges" were immediately dropped once the pointed arch with its malleable proportions was adopted. Still, "the Romanesque arch is beautiful as an abstract line. Its type is always before us in that of the apparent vault of heaven, and horizon of the earth" (John Ruskin, "The Seven Lamps of Architecture").

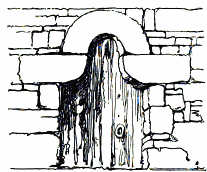
Bell arch

A round arch that sits atop the corbels, with corbels rounded to create a bell-like shape of intrados, is called a bell arch.

When the architecture of the building dictates the rise of the arch to be less than 1/2 of its span (for example, in Roman residential construction), a segmental arch with a rounded shape that is less than a semicircle can be used.

== History and associated styles ==
The popularity of the semicircular arch is based on simplicity of its layout and construction, not superior structural properties. The sides of this arch swing wider than the perfect funicular curve and therefore experience a bending moment with the lateral (sideways) force directed outwards. To prevent buckling, heavy surcharge (fill), so called spandrel, needs to be applied outside of the haunches.

In addition to the Imperial Roman construction, round arches are also associated with Byzantine, Romanesque (and Neo-Romanesque), Renaissance and Rundbogenstil styles. While the semicircular arch was known in the Greek architecture, it mostly played there a decorative, not structural, role.

== Gallery ==
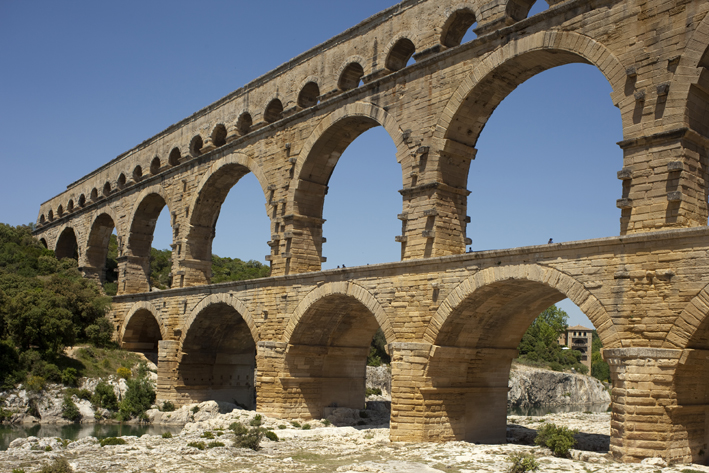
Roman architecture (Pont du Gard)

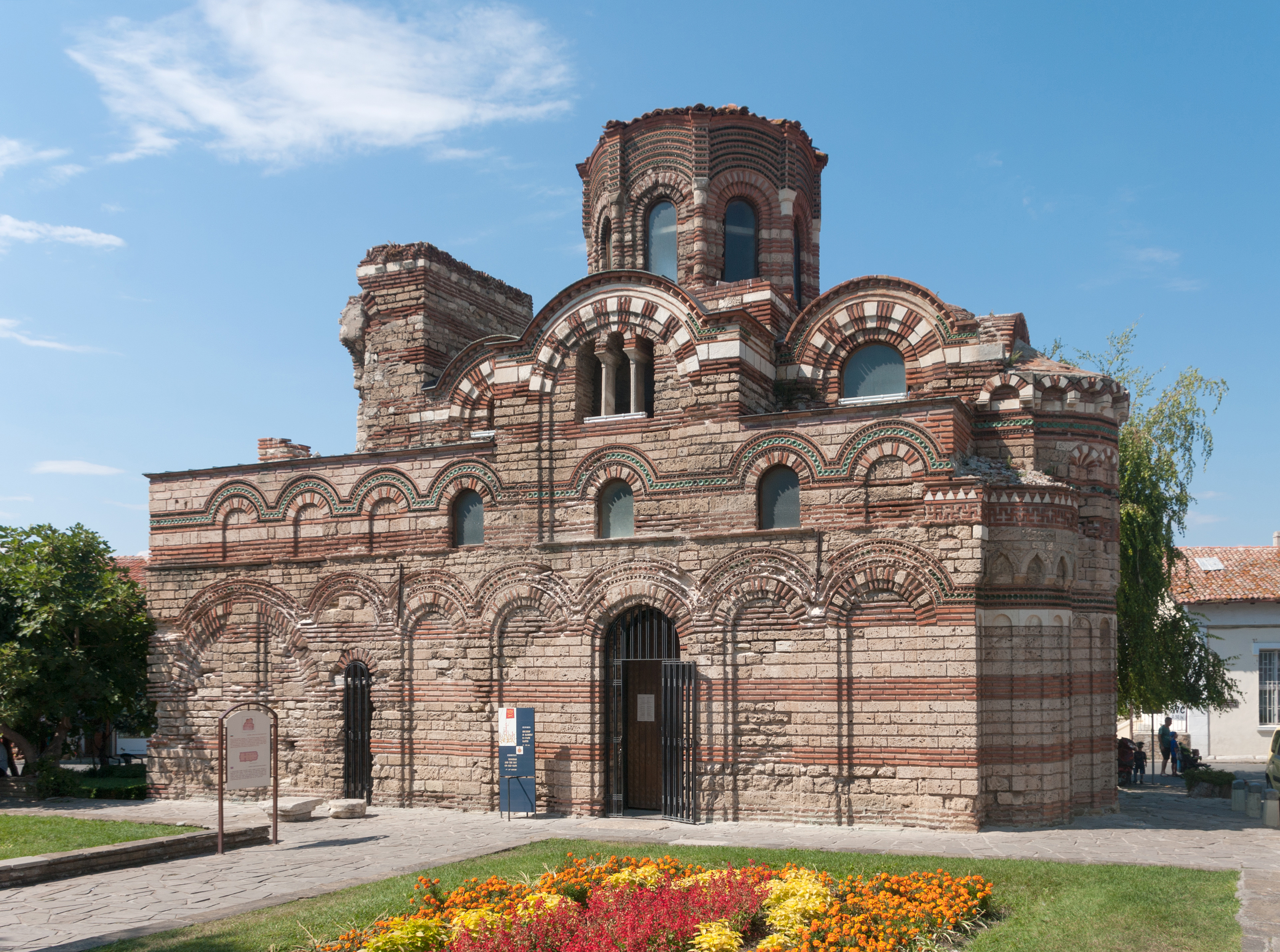
Byzantine architecture (Church of Christ Pantocrator)

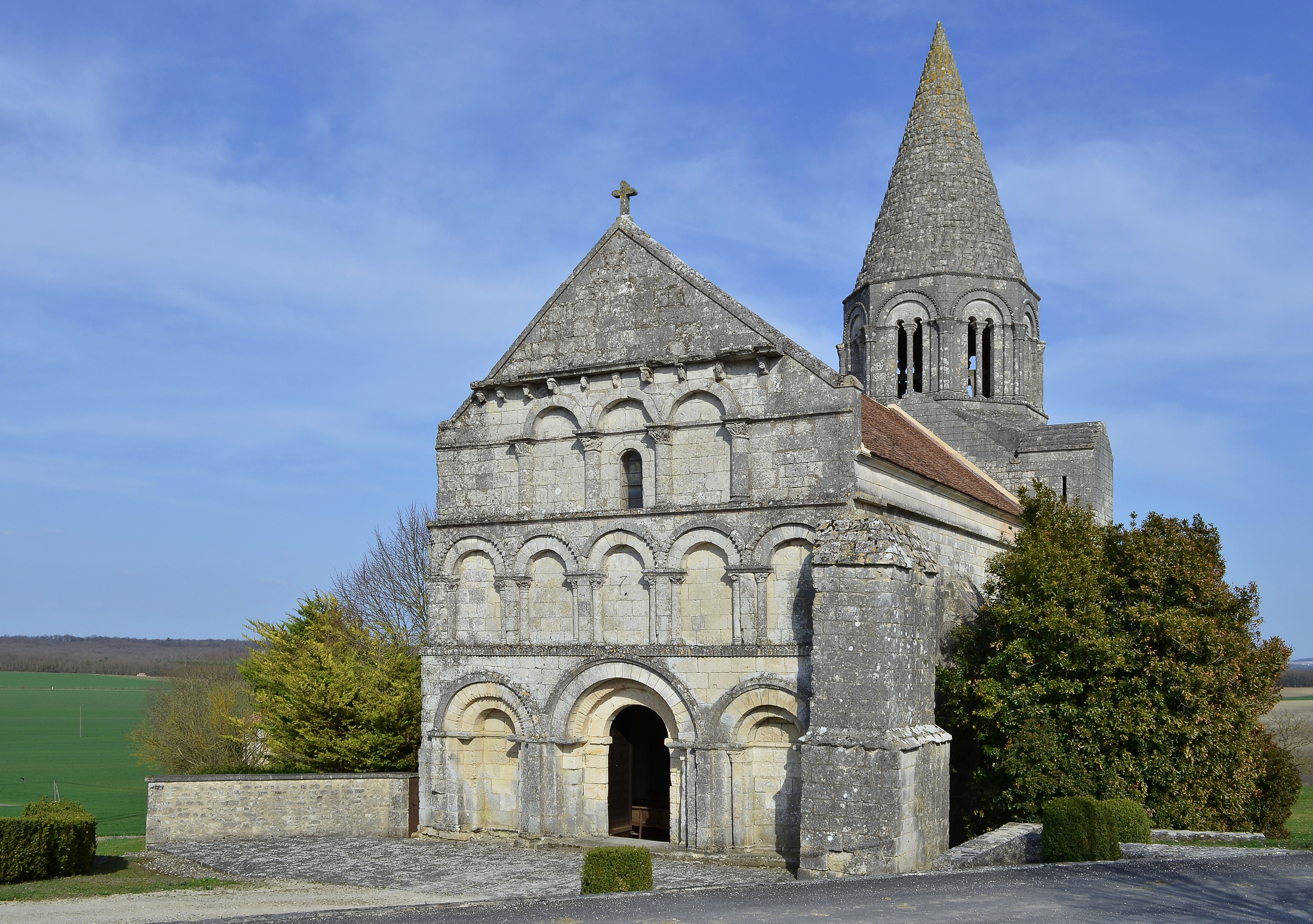
Romanesque architecture (fr:Église Saint-Cybard de Plassac-Rouffiac)

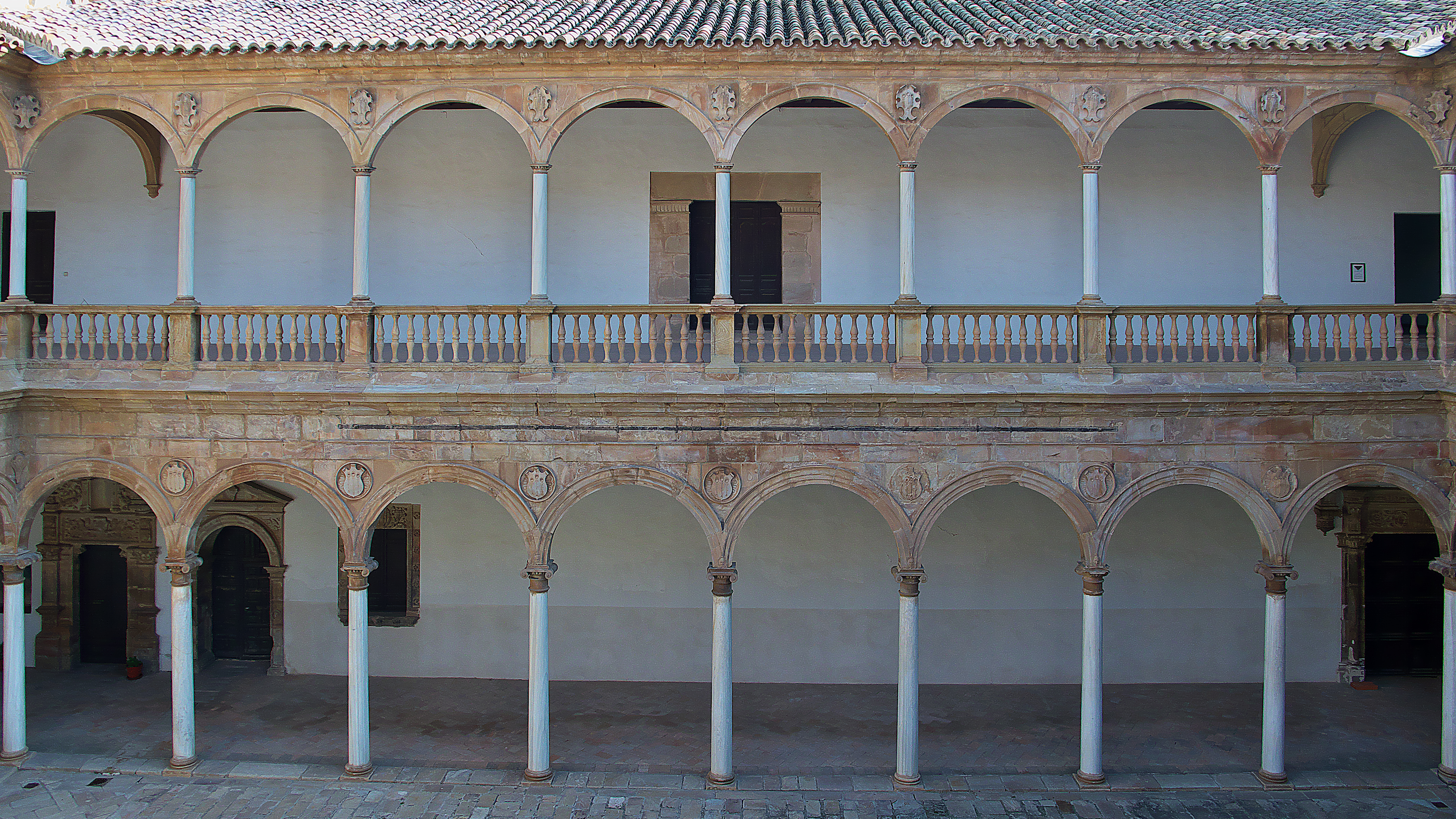
Renaissance architecture (bottom colonnade, Convento de la Asunción (Almagro))

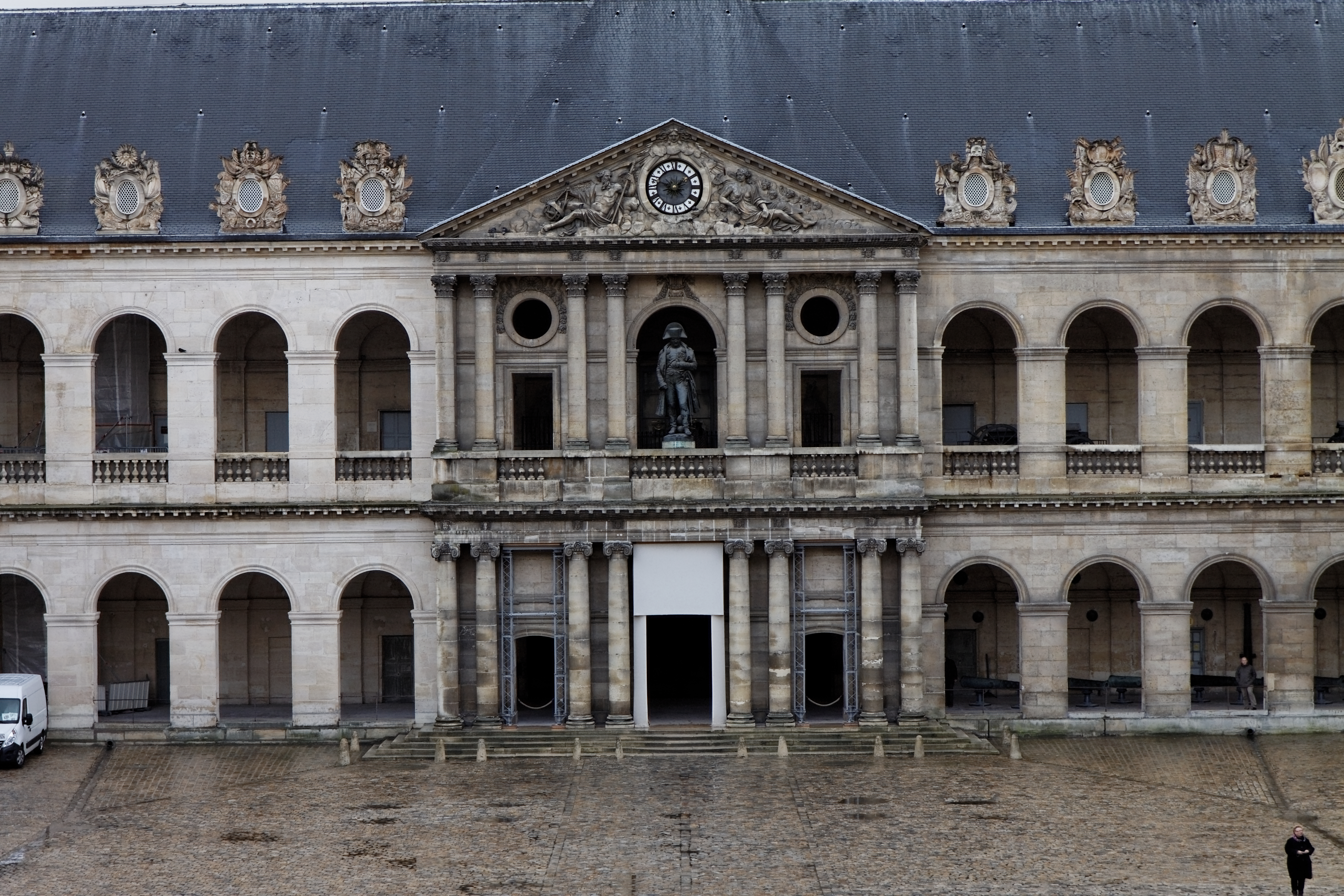
Neoclassical architecture (Hôtel des Invalides)

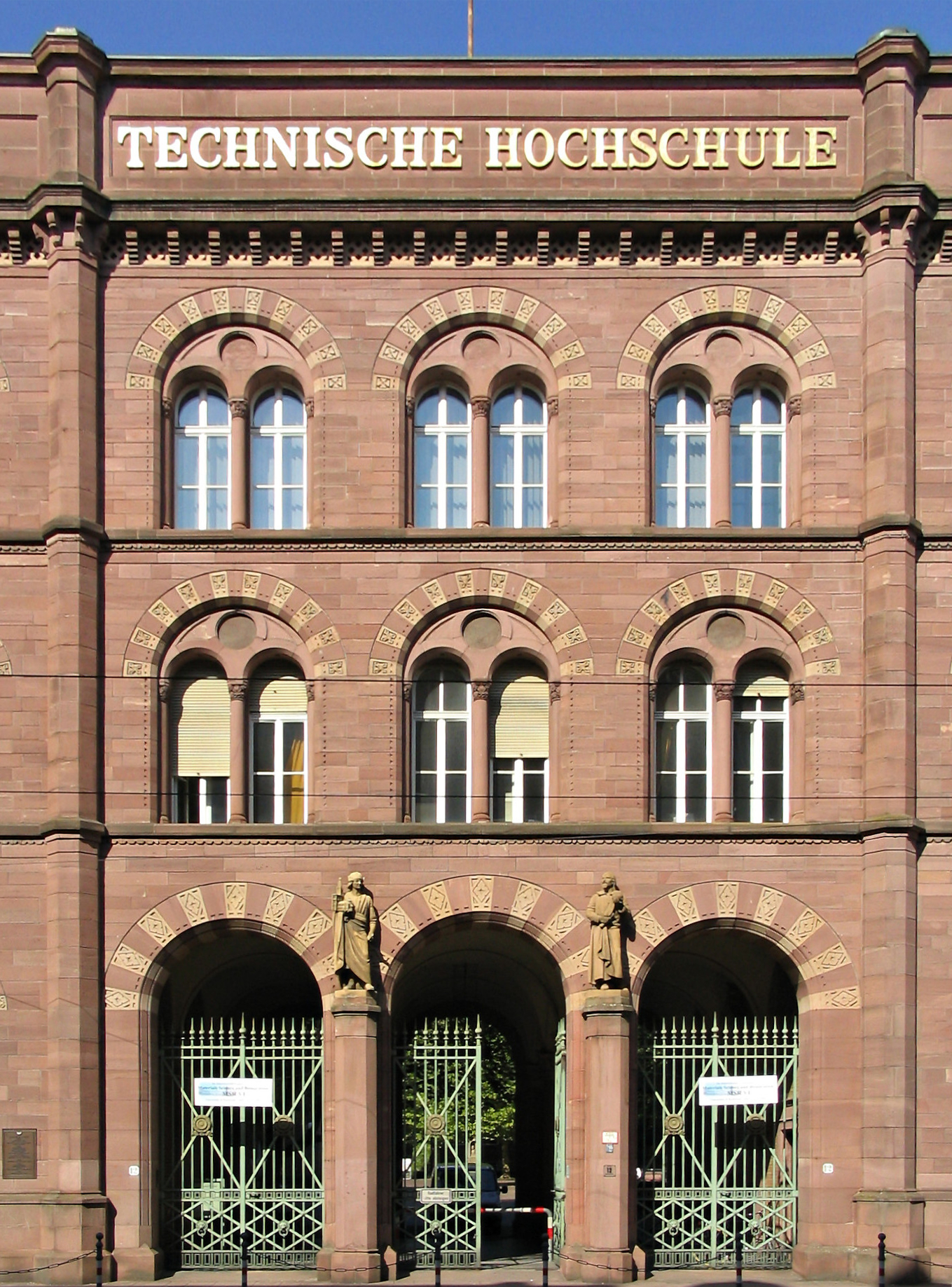
Rundbogenstil (Karlsruhe Polytechnic)

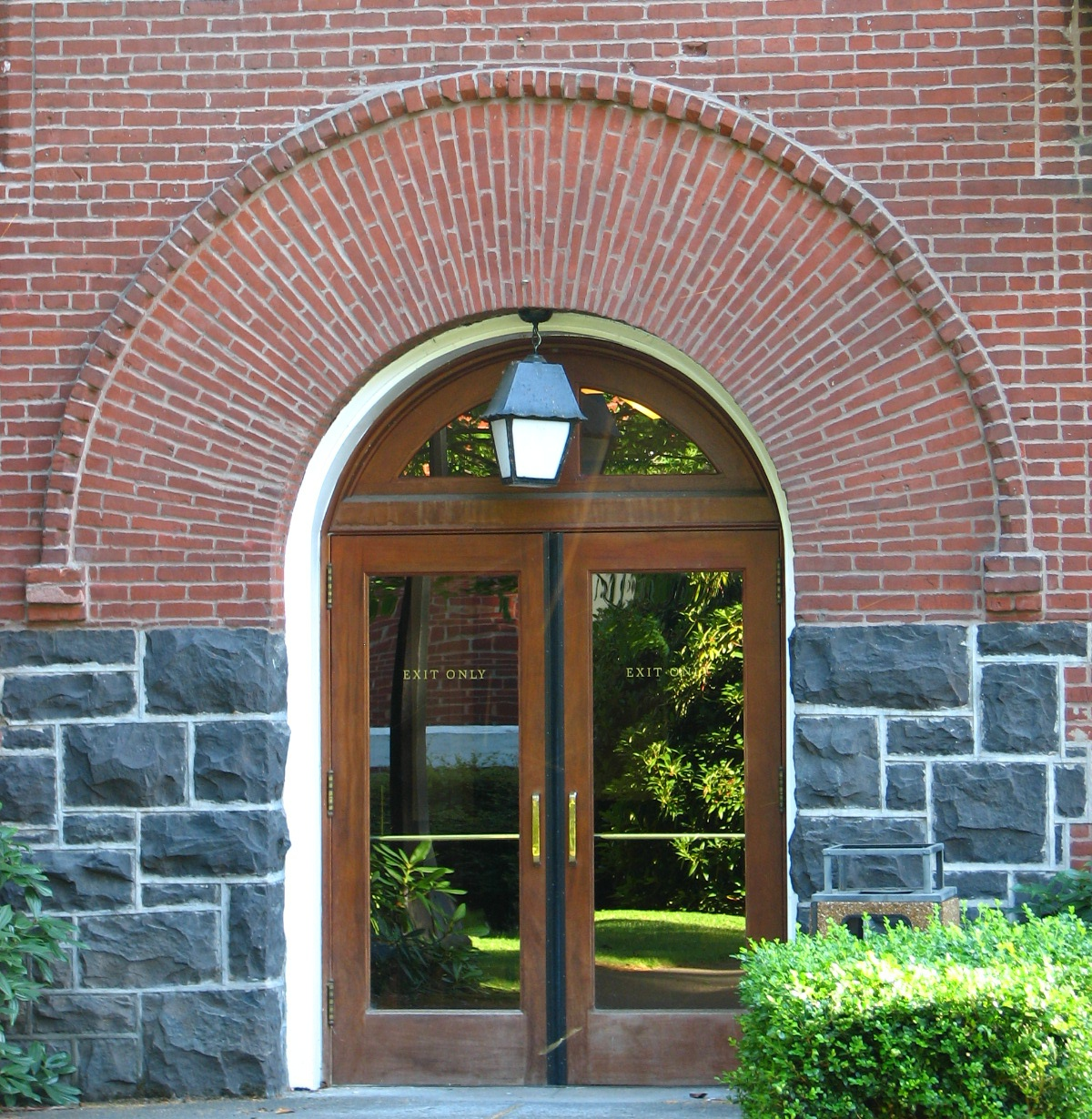
Modernist architecture (University of Portland)

== Sources ==
- "semicircular arch". A Dictionary of Architecture and Landscape Architecture. Oxford University Press. 2006a. doi:10.1093/acref/9780198606789.001.0001. ISBN 978-0-19-860678-9.
- "Roman arch". A Dictionary of Architecture and Landscape Architecture. Oxford University Press. 2006b. doi:10.1093/acref/9780198606789.001.0001. ISBN 978-0-19-860678-9.
- "round". A Dictionary of Architecture and Landscape Architecture. Oxford University Press. 2006c. doi:10.1093/acref/9780198606789.001.0001. ISBN 978-0-19-860678-9.
- Sandaker, B.N.; Eggen, A.P.; Cruvellier, M.R. (2019). The Structural Basis of Architecture. Taylor & Francis. ISBN 978-1-317-22918-6.
- Sturgis, Russell; Davis, Francis A. (2013). "Round Arch". Sturgis' Illustrated Dictionary of Architecture and Building: An Unabridged Reprint of the 1901-2 Edition. Dover Architecture. Dover Publications. ISBN 978-0-486-14840-3.
- Bond, Francis (1905). Gothic Architecture in England: An Analysis of the Origin & Development of English Church Architecture from the Norman Conquest to the Dissolution of the Monasteries. Collections spéciales. B. T. Batsford.
- DeLaine, Janet (1990). "Structural experimentation: The lintel arch, corbel and tie in western Roman architecture". World Archaeology. 21 (3): 407–424. doi:10.1080/00438243.1990.9980116. ISSN 0043-8243.
- Mark, Robert (July–August 1996). "Architecture and Evolution" (PDF). American Scientist. 84 (4). Sigma Xi, The Scientific Research Honor Society: 383–389. JSTOR 29775710.
- Kurtz, J.P. (2007). Dictionary of Civil Engineering: English-French. EngineeringPro collection. Springer US. ISBN 978-0-306-48474-2.
- Davies, N.; Jokiniemi, E. (2012). "bell arch". Architect's Illustrated Pocket Dictionary. Taylor & Francis. ISBN 978-1-136-44407-4.
