= Honley =

Village in West Yorkshire, England

Coordinates: 53.6027°N 1.7921°W

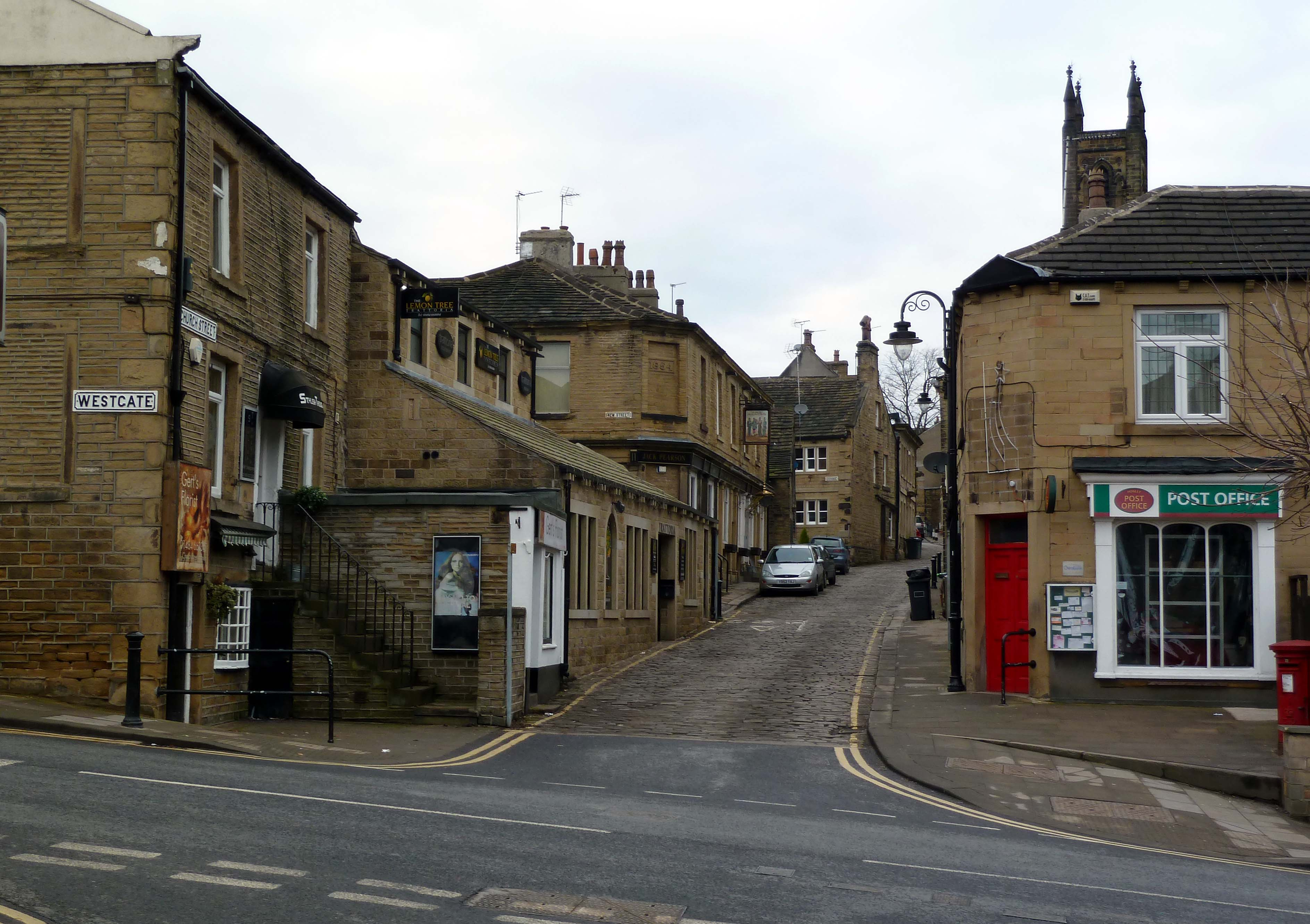
- Honley village centre

- Location within West Yorkshire
- Population: 5,897 (2001 Census)
- OS grid reference: SE137118
  - London: 160 mi (260 km) SSE
- Civil parish: Holme Valley
- Metropolitan borough: Kirklees
- Metropolitan county: West Yorkshire
- Region: Yorkshire and the Humber
- Country: England
- Sovereign state: United Kingdom
- Post town: HOLMFIRTH
- Postcode district: HD9
- Dialling code: 01484
- Police: West Yorkshire
- Fire: West Yorkshire
- Ambulance: Yorkshire
- UK Parliament: Colne Valley

Honley is a village in the Holme Valley civil parish in Kirklees, West Yorkshire, England. Historically part of the West Riding of Yorkshire, it is situated near to Holmfirth and Huddersfield, and on the banks of the River Holme. According to the 2011 Census it had a population of 6,474, a growth of 577 from the 2001 Census.

The name Honley possibly derives from the Old English Hanalēah meaning either 'cock wood or clearing', or 'Hana's wood or clearing'. Alternatively, the first element could be derived from the Old English hān meaning 'stone', specifically a whetstone.

== Community ==
The annual Honley Agricultural Show takes place on the second Saturday of June. The show has used farmland between Honley and Meltham, and more recently farmland in Farnley Tyas. Honley has both female and male voice choirs. There is also a village hall which holds regular events, workshops, meetings and markets all year round.

There are three schools in the village. Honley Infant and Nursery School for ages 3–7, Honley Junior School for ages 7–11 and Honley High School which after abolishing its sixth form college is now for ages 11–16.

== Transport ==
Honley railway station opened on 1 July 1850, on the Penistone Line. It connects the village to Huddersfield and Sheffield with an hourly service.

There are regular bus services to Huddersfield, Holmfirth and Meltham. Most bus services are operated by the First West Yorkshire and Team Pennine

== Church ==
The parish church is St Mary's, a Grade II listed mostly Victorian church, constructed in 1843 by Robert Dennis Chantrell, with later additions in 1888 and 1909. The church was built on the remains of an earlier church, known as 'Old Peg' built in 1759. It is surrounded by a burial ground containing inscribed tombstones with remnants of a set of village stocks. Though an earlier building was possibly constructed in 1503.

== Sport ==
Honley F.C. fields junior teams at under-6 level to under-17 levels. The teams play in the Huddersfield Junior Football League, and play competitive seven-a-side matches from under-7s to under-10s and eleven-a-side matches from under-11s to under-17s. An adult side with three teams plays in the Huddersfield and District Association Football League. The 'A' team is in the second division, the 'B' team in reserve division one, and the 'C' team in reserve division three.

Honley also has teams in the Huddersfield Cricket League.

On 6 July 2014, Stage 2 of the 2014 Tour de France from York to Sheffield, passed through the village.

== Governance ==
Honley was a township and chapelry in the parish of Almondbury, In 1866 Honley became a separate civil parish, in 1894 Honley became an urban district, on 1 April 1938 when the parish and urban district were abolished and merged with Holmfirth. In 1931 the parish had a population of 4611.

== Notable people ==
- General Sir Clement Armitage, General Officer Commanding 1st Infantry Division
- Biff Byford, singer with heavy metal band Saxon.
- Isabella Donkersley (1864-1938), the daughter of Joseph Bedford Donkersley, a violinist who studied at the Royal College of Music from 1884, she married August Jaeger on 22 December 1898 at St Mary Abbots. Her sister Lucy (1859-1923) was a pianist. She had two children with Mr Jaeger, including Mary Jaeger (26 April 1900 - September 1991, East Sussex). Isabella Hunter died on Sunday 9 October 1938, at her daughter's house, in North Finchley
- Alonzo Drake, Yorkshire County Cricketer, born c.1885, d. 14 February 1919. Buried in Honley Cemetery.
- John Dyson (1913–1991), first-class cricketer
- Mary A Jagger, (1849-1936), author of The History of Honley, published in 1914. She was also the first woman Postmistress in England.
- France Littlewood (1863–1941), a socialist activist.
- Captain Sydney Liversedge (1897–1979), First World War flying ace, was born in Honley.
- Dora Thewlis (1880–1976), suffragette, was born in Honley.
- David Bintley, Director of the Birmingham Royal Ballet and Artistic Director of the National Ballet of Japan. Born in Honley and former head of Maths at Honley High School.
- Jon Stead, ex-professional footballer

== Gallery ==
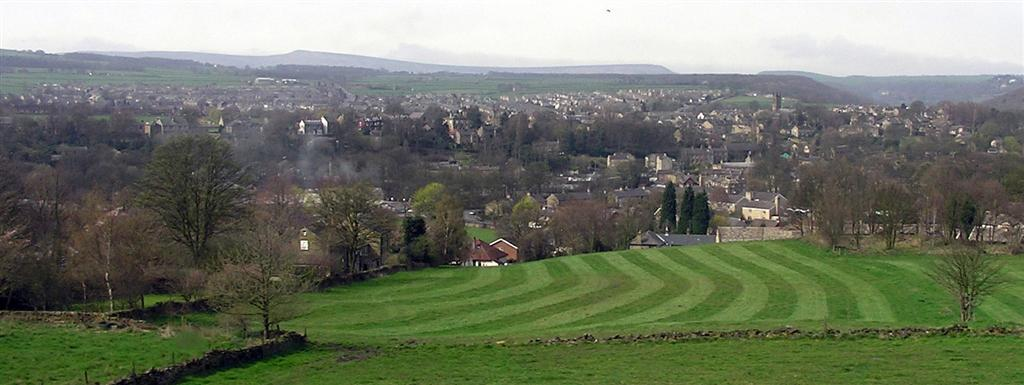
Village viewed from the railway line to Brockholes

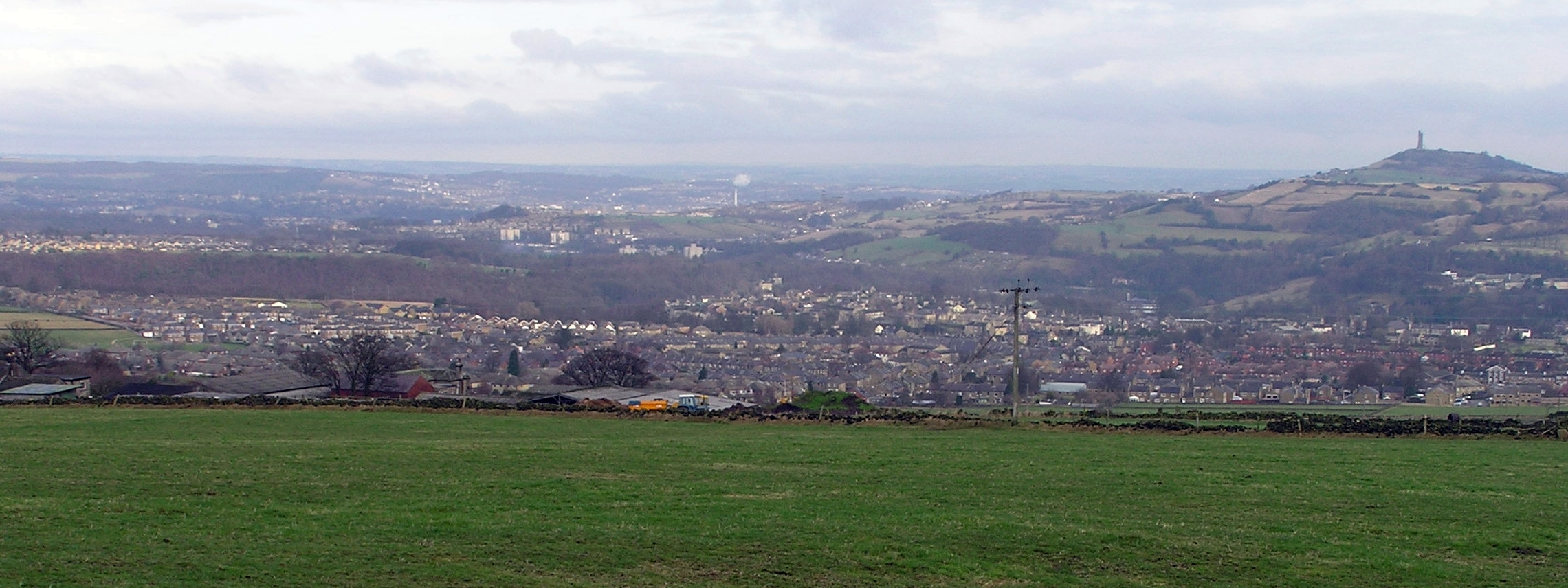
Honley viewed from Oldfield Road. Castle Hill is seen top right with Huddersfield in the distance. Central to the picture is Berry Brow & Newsome

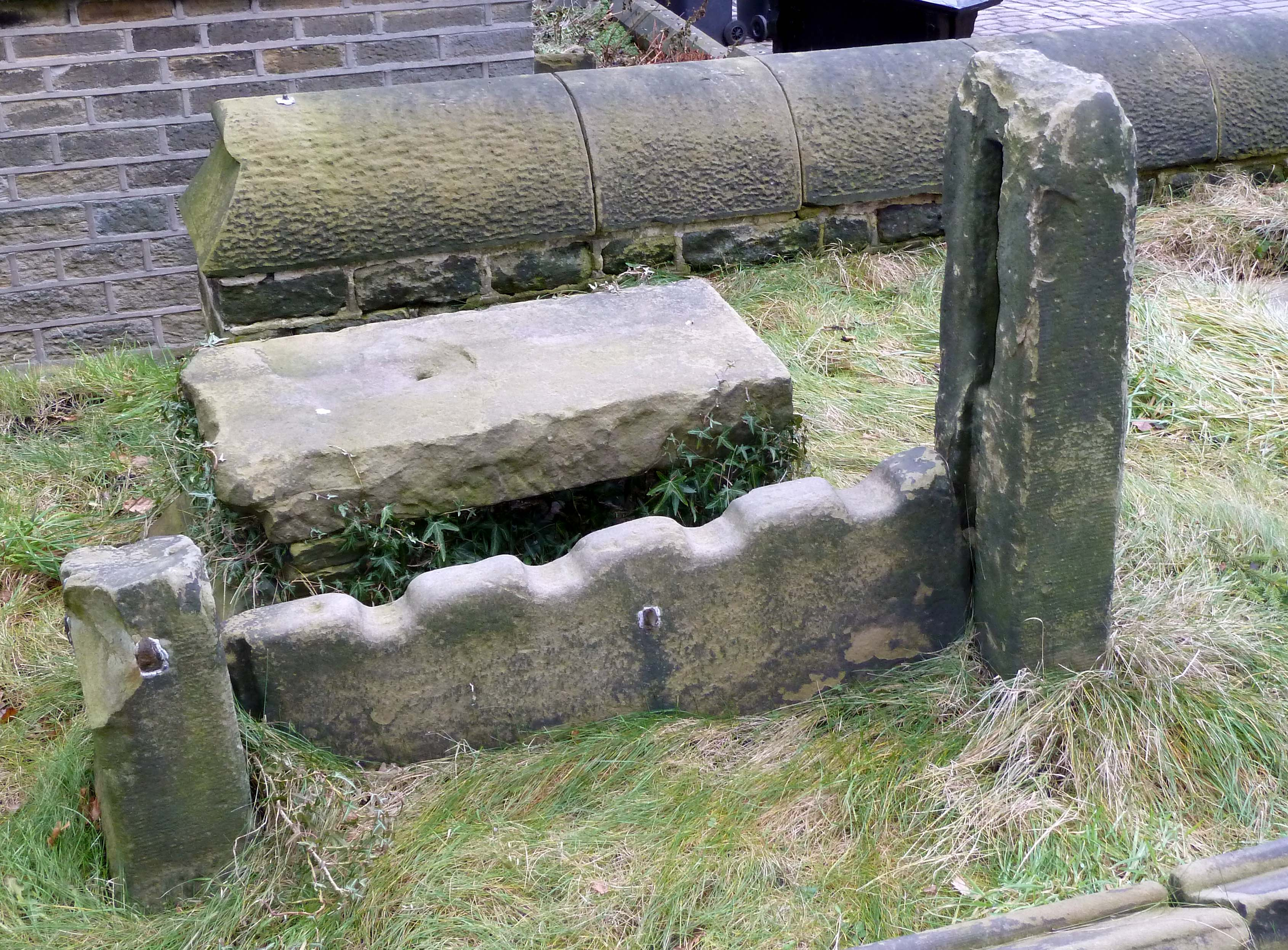
Remains of village stocks in St Mary's Churchyard

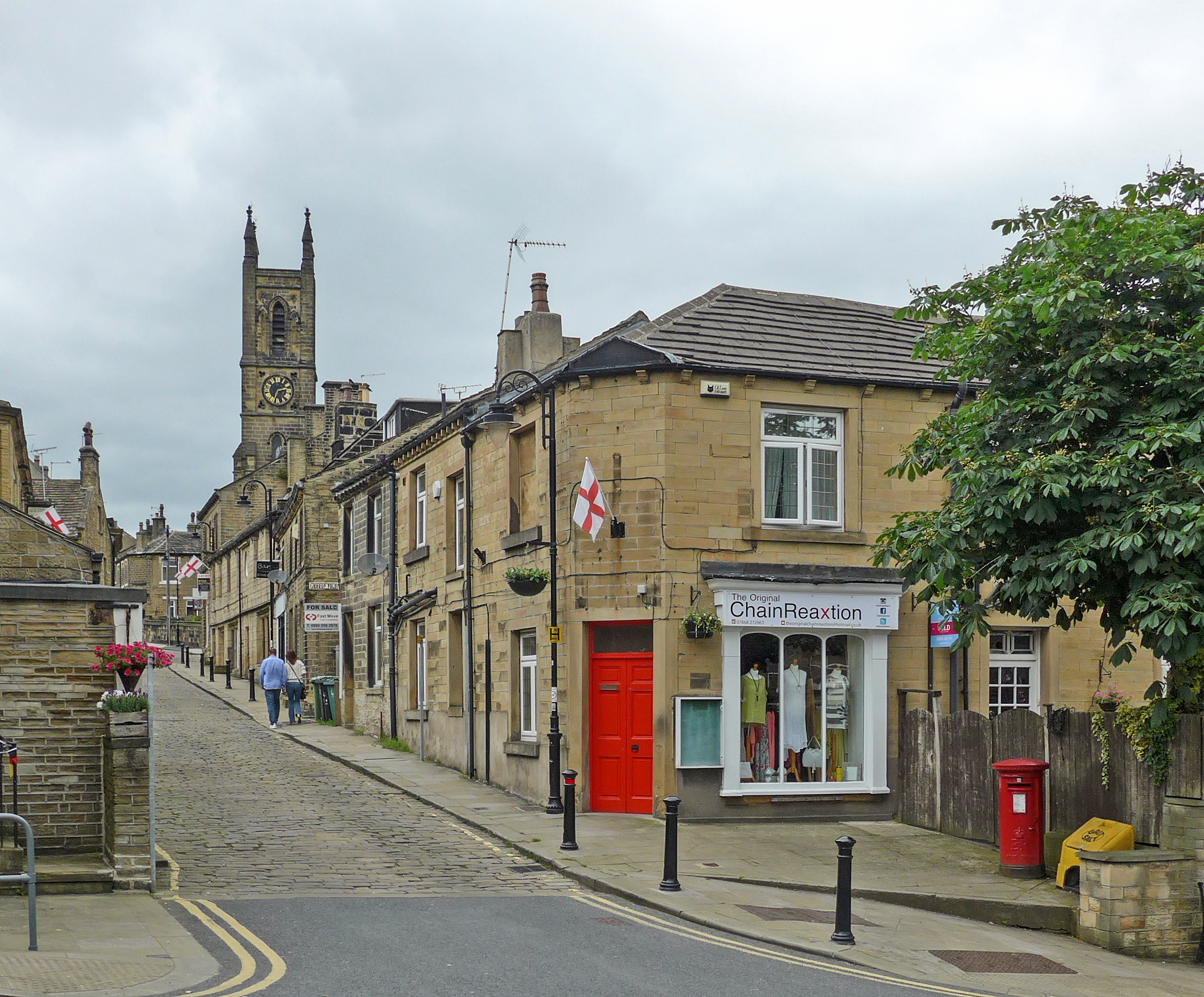
St Mary's Church, peeping above the houses on Church St, Honley
