= Meltham Town Hall =

Municipal building in Meltham, West Yorkshire, England

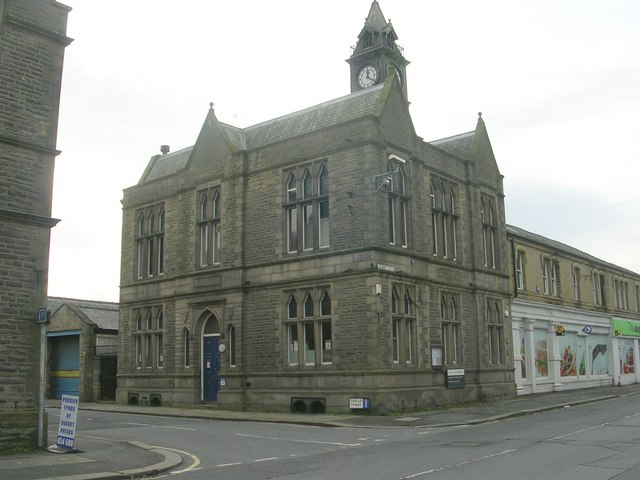
- Meltham Town Hall

- Shown in West Yorkshire
- 53.5922°N 1.8490°W
- Location: Carlile Street, Meltham

History
- Built: 1898

Site notes
- Architect: William Carter
- Architectural style: Gothic Revival style

Meltham Town Hall is a municipal building in Carlile Street in Meltham, West Yorkshire, England. The building, which formerly operated as the offices of Meltham Urban District Council, is now The Crossroads Centre, which operates the local foodbank.

== History ==
Following significant population growth, largely associated with the development of a large cotton mill known as Meltham Mills, the area became an urban district in 1894. The senior partner of the firm operating Meltham Mills, Jonas Brook and Bros., was Edward Brook, who offered to commission a town hall at his own expense: the site he selected was a small piece of land facing the Carlile Institute in Carlile Road. The building was designed by the town clerk, William Carter, in the Gothic Revival style, built by John Moorhouse and Sons in limestone with ashlar finishings at a cost of £2,882 and was officially opened by the benefactor's son, Charles Brook, on 5 February 1898.

The design involved a symmetrical main frontage with three bays facing onto Carlile Street. The central bay, which slightly projected forward, featured an arched doorway surmounted by a cornice and flanked by lancet windows set in a rusticated surround; there was a two-light mullioned window on the first floor and a gable with a finial above. The outer bays were fenestrated by three-light mullioned windows on both floors. At roof level, there was a central clock tower with a pyramid-shaped roof and a weather vane; the hour-striking clock was by Potts & Sons of Leeds. Internally, the principal rooms were the council chamber, which was decorated with Tynecastle tapestry, the committee room and offices for council officials. A portrait of Edward Brook by Henry Mawdsley was hung in the council chamber and unveiled in March 1913.

The town hall continued to serve as the headquarters of the urban district council for much of the 20th century, but ceased to be the local seat of government when the enlarged Kirklees Council was formed in 1974. The building instead became the local library and also the offices of Meltham Town Council until services and staff moved across the road to the Carlile Institute in 2016. The town council acquired the town hall from Kirklees Council in October 2018, and part of the building was subsequently converted for use as The Crossroads Centre, which operates the local foodbank.
