= Dora Thewlis =

British suffragette

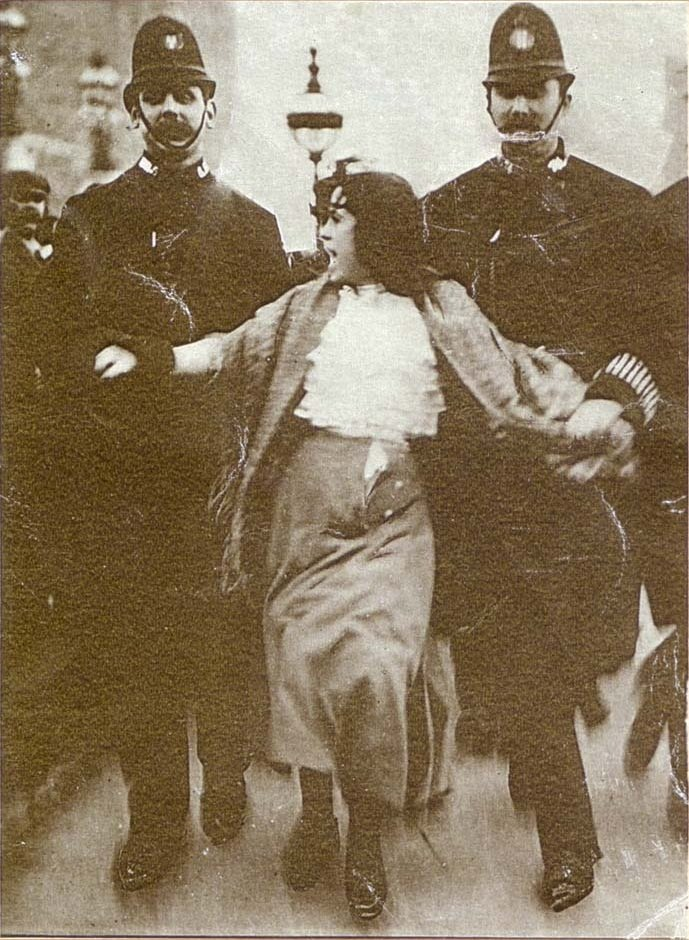
- Thewlis was arrested on 20 March 1907. This photograph appeared in the Daily Mirror the following day.
- Born: 15 May 1890; Meltham Mills, West Riding of Yorkshire, England
- Died: 1976 (aged 85–86); Ascot Vale, Victoria, Australia
- Occupation: British suffragette
- Organization: Women's Social and Political Union
- Known for: working for women's rights
- Criminal charge: Arrested in 1907 for planning to break into the Houses of Parliament
- Spouse: Jack Dow (m. 1918)
- Children: 2
- Parent(s): James and Eliza Thewlis

Dora Thewlis (15 May 1890 – 1976) was a British suffragette. A picture of her arrest on 20 March 1907 made the front page of the Daily Mirror and other outlets in the press.

== Early life ==
Thewlis was born on 15 May 1890, at Shady Row in Meltham Mills, near Huddersfield in the West Riding of Yorkshire. She was one of seven children born to James and Eliza (née Taylor) Thewlis, who was from Woodbridge, Suffolk. At the time James was working locally as a weaver. Dora worked in a Yorkshire mill as a teen.

== As a suffragette ==
Thewlis was sixteen when she joined the Women's Social and Political Union in 1907. She was arrested the same year, having been part of a planned break in into the Houses of Parliament, when seventy-five women were arrested. She was patronised by the judge at her court appearance, and implied she had been going to London for immoral purposes. She was labelled the 'Baby Suffragette' and the 'little mill hand' by the press. She appeared on the front page of the Daily Mirror (picture to the right) after the event, with the caption "Suffragettes storm the House,"`and called 'girl suffragist' in The Daily Chronicle or 'infant agitator' in The Times. This kind of adverse publicity was not welcomed by the suffrage movement.

The judge suggested her parents might take her in hand and sort her out. Their reply was she was her own person and they fully supported her. The family were socialists and her mother Eliza was quoted in the Huddersfield Weekly Examiner as saying that she had brought Dora up to read newspapers since the age of 7 and to debate politics. The family had also supported Mrs Pankhurst at the local by-election. Dora's sentence was two weeks in prison, but she served one. On her departure escorted by a wardress, she met with Edith How-Martyn.

Thewlis emigrated to Australia before the start of the First World War, therefore never seeing the passage of women's suffrage in England, and in 1918 she married Jack Dow, who predeceased her in 1956. They had two children, she died in 1976 in Ascot Vale, Victoria.

== See also ==
- Women's suffrage in the United Kingdom
- Women's Social and Political Union
- List of suffragists and suffragettes
