= Stilted arch =

Architectural element

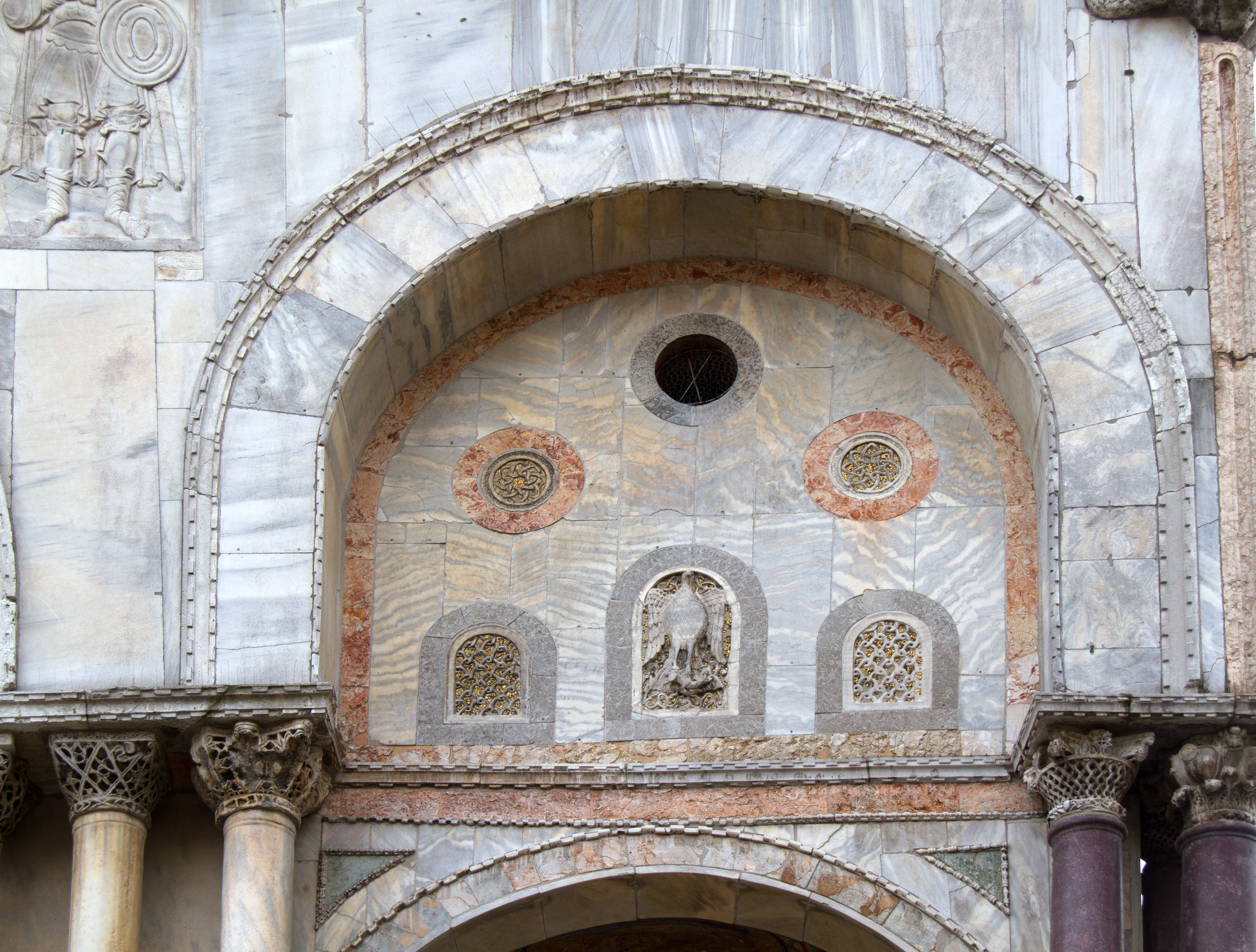
Semicircular stilted arch at St Mark's Basilica in Venice

A stilted arch, also called a surmounted arch, is an arch where the bottom of the intrados consists of vertical sections, or stilts, and the arch springs from the vertical significantly higher than the impost level. Both semicircular and pointed arches can be stilted. As a result, the stilted arch has its center above the impost.

In Byzantine architecture, the arch was frequently used in order to give more importance to the twin arches of the windows, and less to the shaft which divided them. In Islamic architecture, it was used since the mid-8th century (Hisham's Palace).

The rise (height) of a round arch is limited to 1/2 of its span, so it looks more "grounded" than a parabolic arch or pointed arch. Whenever a higher semicircular arch was required (for example, for a narrow arch to match the height of a nearby broad one), stilting could be used. In Romanesque and Gothic work the semicircular stilted arch was often employed in the semi-circular apses, where in consequence of the closer spacing of the columns the arches were much narrower than those of the choir; in order, however, that the apex of all the arches should be of the same height, the apse arches were stilted. In Norman architecture the stilted arch was used when there was a need for a groin vault over a non-square space. These "shifts and dodges" were dropped once the pointed arch with its malleable proportions was adopted. There is still a decorative value in a stilted arch, as its slender opening strengthens the framing effect for the view through the arch.

The horseshoe arch can be though of as variant of the stilted arch, with the masonry below the springing line going beyond the vertical line inwards.

== Nasrid arch ==
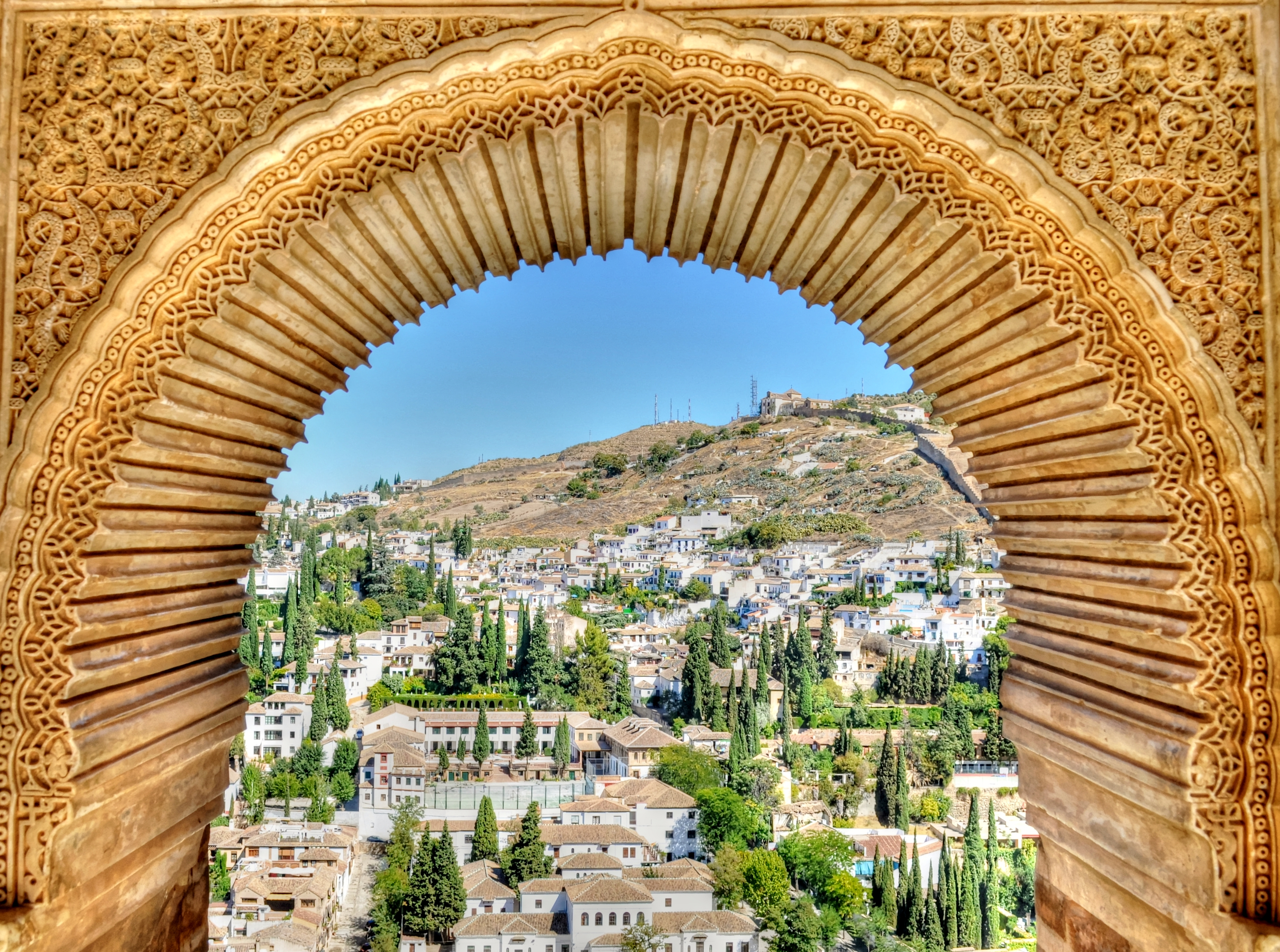
Nasrid arch frames a view in the Alhambra palace

Nasrid arch is the stilted derivative of a multifoil arch. It was developed during the rule of the Nasrid dynasty and became its architectural symbol, with many examples throughout the Alhambra. It was a non-structural arch: during Nasrid period the Islamic architecture in Granada in general concentrated more on the decorative aspects.

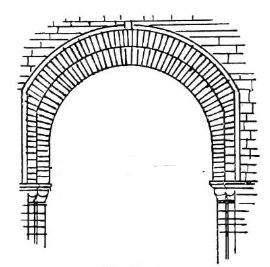
Stilted arch made of bricks

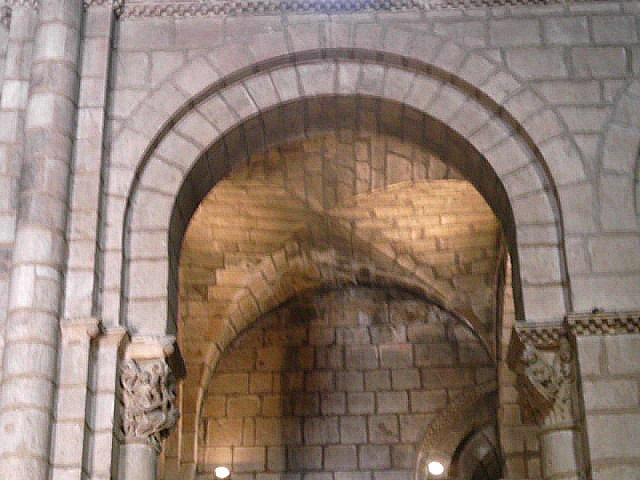
Stilted arch in San Isidoro de León

== Sources ==
- Bloxam, M.H. (1882). The Principles of Gothic Ecclesiastical Architecture: With an Explanation of Technical Terms, and a Centenary of Ancient Terms. Vol. 1. G. Bell and sons.
- Bliss, Ian; Garside, Roger; Haslam, Ray, eds. (2008). "Stilted Arch". Ruskin's Venetian Notebooks Notes. Lancaster University.
- Bond, Francis (1905). Gothic Architecture in England: An Analysis of the Origin & Development of English Church Architecture from the Norman Conquest to the Dissolution of the Monasteries. Collections spéciales. B. T. Batsford.
- Echols, G. (2000). "Glossary". Early Texas Architecture. Texas Christian University Press. ISBN 978-0-87565-223-8.
- Fortlage, C.A.; Phillips, E.T. (2017). "Stilted arch". Landscape Construction: Volume 1: Walls, Fences and Railings. Taylor & Francis. ISBN 978-1-351-56107-5.
- Hourihane, C. (2012). "Arch". The Grove Encyclopedia of Medieval Art and Architecture. Vol. 1. Oxford University Press. pp. 129–134. ISBN 978-0-19-539536-5.
- Montéquin, François-Auguste De (1991). "Arches in the Architecture of Muslim Spain : Typology and Evolution". Islamic Studies. 30 (1/2). Islamic Research Institute, International Islamic University, Islamabad: 67–82. ISSN 0578-8072. JSTOR 20840025.
- Pevsner, Nikolaus; Honour, Hugh; Fleming, Nikolaus (1992). Lexikon der Weltarchitektur (in German) (3 ed.). Munich: Prestel. ISBN 3-7913-2095-5.
- Sandaker, B.N.; Eggen, A.P.; Cruvellier, M.R. (2019). The Structural Basis of Architecture. Taylor & Francis. ISBN 978-1-317-22918-6.
