= John Dyson (Oxford University cricketer) =

English cricketer (1913–1991)

Personal information
- Full name: John Humphrey Dyson
- Born: 28 September 1913; Honley, Yorkshire, England
- Died: 16 July 1991 (aged 77); Wonford, Devon, England
- Batting: Right-handed
- Bowling: Slow left-arm orthodox

Domestic team information
- Years: Team
- 1933–1936: Oxford University

Career statistics
Competition	First-class
Matches	26
Runs scored	211
Batting average	7.53
100s/50s	–/–
Top score	35
Balls bowled	4,486
Wickets	68
Bowling average	31.52
5 wickets in innings	3
10 wickets in match	–
Best bowling	6/47
Catches/stumpings	7/–
- Source: Cricinfo, 2 June 2019

John Humphrey Dyson (28 September 1913 – 16 July 1991) was an English first-class cricketer. He played first-class cricket for Oxford University and the Free Foresters between 1933–38.

== Life and first-class cricket ==
Dyson was born at Honley in Yorkshire on 28 September 1913. He was educated at Charterhouse School, where he played for the school cricket team for two years. From Charterhouse he went up to Christ Church, Oxford. While studying at Oxford he made his debut in first-class cricket for Oxford University against the Free Foresters at Oxford in 1933. He played just once for the university in 1933, but followed this up with eleven first-class appearances in the following season. The 1934 season started well for Dyson, with him 29 wickets, with best figures of 5 for 54, however he struggled toward the tailend of the season and was dropped by Oxford captain Gerry Chalk. He made two appearances in 1935, but struggled against Lancashire as Cyril Washbrook made 228. He managed to force his way back into the Oxford team in 1936, making eleven first-class appearances and taking 34 wickets at an average of 22.88, with best figures of 6 for 47. Dyson played 25 first-class matches for Oxford, taking 68 wickets his slow left-arm orthodox bowling, at an average of 30.98. He later made a final first-class appearance for the Free Foresters against Oxford University in 1938. He died at Wonford in Exeter in July 1991.
